= Pyay Ti Oo =

Actor

- ပြေတီဦး
- Born: Pyay Ti Oo; 30 November 1978 (age 47); Chaunggaung Village, Pyay, Bago Division, Myanmar
- Education: Bachelor of Engineering (B.E.)
- Alma mater: Mandalay Technological University
- Occupations: Actor, model
- Years active: 1999–present
- Height: 170 cm (5 ft 7 in)
- Spouse: Eaindra Kyaw Zin (m. 2011)
- Children: 2
- Parent(s): Tin Maung Oo and Ti Ti
- Awards: Myanmar Motion Picture Academy Awards (Best Leading Actor for 2010, 2012, 2013, 2014, 2022)

Pyay Ti Oo (Burmese: ပြေတီဦး, born 30 November 1978) is a five-time Myanmar Motion Picture Academy Awards winning film actor and advertising model in Myanmar. He is CEO of Pyay Ti Oo Education Foundation, which provides scholarships to economically disadvantaged students who have been accepted into medical school.

== Early life ==
Pyay Ti Oo was born on 30 November 1978 in Yangon to Ti Ti and her physician husband, Dr. Tin Maung Oo. The middle child of three siblings, he has one elder sister, Swe Ti Oo, and one younger sister, Ngwe Ti Oo. His family moved to Mokpalin after his birth. He graduated from Mandalay Technological University with a B.E. degree in Civil Engineering.

== Career ==
Pyay Ti Oo started acting since he was a student. He got his first break in 1999 when he appeared in the program of "Myanmar Language" on Myanmar Radio and Television. His first film was Yan Kyway in which he appeared in a supporting role. Pyay Ti Oo acted in six films and many TV advertisements in 2009. His most successful movies from 2009 were Chit-Pan Wah Wah, Cho Lein (Artificial Treat), Yin-Bat Chin A-Nyi, Kyama Pakhon Hma Leikpya Lay Dwe Na Khe Bu De. Pyay Ti Oo won the 2010 Best Lead Actor Award of Myanmar Academy Award Ceremony on 7 February 2012. He won the Academy Award for his performance in the film Adam, Eve and Datsa (Burmese: အာဒမ်ရယ်၊ ဧဝရယ်၊ ဒသရယ်). His role "Min Htin Si" in that movie is kind of villain.

== Personal life ==
Pyay Ti Oo has said that if he were not involved in the entertainment industry, he would have become an engineer. Pyay Ti Oo married actress Eaindra Kyaw Zin in January 2011. Their wedding ceremony was broadcast "live" on Burmese TV, MRTV-4. The couple gave birth to their very first born daughter, Pyay Thudra on 14 October 2011.

== Social works and political activities ==
Pyay Ti Oo founded the "Pyay Ti Oo Education Foundation" with a seed investment of ($10000) 10 million kyats. Outstanding students, who qualify to study at medical universities but cannot afford the tuition, are eligible to apply for a grant from his foundation. Each student will receive K50,000 a month for the duration of their studies but must adhere to certain rules and regulations. Students who take up the scholarship are required to stay and work in Myanmar for five years after completing their degrees. They are also not permitted to leave the country or get married while they are studying. Poor grades and attendance records are also grounds for termination of support. For fund-raising, Pyay Ti Oo and his fellow artists made Pyay Ti Oo Foundation Fun-Raising Concert on 4 December 2011 at Thuwunna Indoor Stadium, Yangon. They produced two videos of that and donate all their artist fees.

Following the 2021 Myanmar coup d'état, Pyay Ti Oo participated in the anti-coup movement by attending anti-government rallies and denouncing the coup through social media, starting in February. He joined the "We Want Justice" three-finger salute movement. The movement was launched on social media, and many celebrities joined the movement.

On 17 February 2021, authorities issued an arrest warrant for Pyay Ti Oo, along with those for several other celebrities, for encouraging civil servants to join ongoing civil disobedience movement.

On 9 April 2021, Pyay Ti Oo and his wife Eaindra Kyaw Zin surrendered to the police. They were released on 2 March 2022.

== Filmography ==
Lists of films
Year	Film	Co-Stars
2000	Yan Kyway	
2009	Chit Pan Wah Wah	
2009	Cho Lein	
2009	Yin Bat Chin Anyi	Eindra Kyaw Zin
2009	Kyama Pakhon Paw Hma Leippya Lay Dway Na Ge Bu De	Thet Mon Myint, May Ka Byar
2009	Lay Hline Chit Thu	Thet Mon Myint, Tint Tint Htun
2010	Chin Phat	
2010	Yay Yote Yay Che Thu	
2010	Pan Ton Kabya	Eindra Kyaw Zin, San Htut
2010	A-Phyu Yaung Lwinbyin Mya	
2010	Letwe Bet Yin-Bat Hsi Ga Guitar	
2010	Chit Phu De Ma Lwe Bu Yu Naing De	Tint Tin Htun, Wine Su, Chaw Ya Ta Nar
2010	Bite Bite Bite	Kyaw Ye Aung, Soe Myat Thuza, Nawarat
2010	Kya Go Tote De Pya	
2010	The Ko Phya Achit	
2010	Chit Ma Chit Akyee Gyi Chit	
2010	Chote Say	Eindra Kyaw Zin
2010	Lay-Byay Tay Thwa Seit-Ku Nghet-Lay-Mya	Eindra Kyaw Zin
2010	Chit-Thu Ye Chit-Thu	Thet Mon Myint
2010	Hnin Dandaryi	Eindra Kyaw Zin
2010	Na Kyat Kwet Ninn De Yaukpha	Thet Mon Myint
2010	Apyo Lay Ye Cowboy	Eindra Kyaw Zin
2010	Ma Chit Pe Ma Nay Naing Bu	Eindra Kyaw Zin
2010	Short Shi De Achit	Eindra Kyaw Zin, Khant Sithu and Moe Hay Ko
2010	A-Hsint Myint Chit Zaga	
2010	1500 Kyaw De	
2010	Yin-Khon Than	Phway Phway
2010	Mahaythi Ye Jalaby	Eindra Kyaw Zin
2010	Bat Ki Hpuza	Eindra Kyaw Zin
2010	3+4=Love	Eindra Kyaw Zin
2010	Wut Hmone Win Ei Apyin Sa Yatha	Wut Hmone Shwe Yee
2010	Apyin Sa Uyin-Hmu	Soe Myat Thuzar
2010	Ba Laung Ba Le	Moe Hay Ko
2010	Hmaw Panthi	Moe Hay Ko
2010	Meinma Yu Me Hso Yin Sin-Za Bo Lo Me	Eindra Kyaw Zin
2011	Shwe Lin-Ban Ne Pan Kan Thu	Wut Hmone Shwe Yee
2011	Juliet Ta Yay Noe	Moe Hay Ko
2011	Chit-Thu Thi Zay	Eindra Kyaw Zin
2011	Dar Kyi Pee Mha Phwa Kya Par	Eindra Kyaw Zin
2011	Yone Kyi Chin Hnin Si	Wut Hmone Shwe Yee
2011	Yin-Dwin Ashotdawbon	Phway Phway, Moe Yu San
2011	Ka Kyoe Sone De Tha Toe Tha	Moe Hay Ko
2011	Chocolate Love	Eindra Kyaw Zin
2011	Nint	Wut Hmone Shwe Yee
2011	Di Kaung-Ma-Lay Atwet	Wut Hmone Shwe Yee
2011	Nat-Thami Phaw De A-seit	Moe Hay Ko
2011	Pa Hta Ma Sone Chit Tar Nin	Wut Hmone Shwe Yee
2011	Let Ma Htat Mi 3 Naryi	Moe Hay Ko
2011	Kyanaw Yaukkhama Ne Thu-Ei Virus Mya	Soe Myat Thuzar, Soe Myat Nandar, Soe Pyae Thazin, Sandi Myint Lwin, Wai Lyan
2011	Achit Yawga	Moe Hay Ko

=== Films (Big Screen Movies) ===
Lists of Films
Year	Film	Director	Co-Stars
2009	Shote-Shet Te Achit Mya	Ko Zaw (Aryon Oo)	Khant Sithu, Eaindra Kyaw Zin, Moe Hay Ko, Soe Myat Thuzar
2010	Swe Ta Yar Maung Ta Kyeit	Mee Pwar	Khant Sithu, Khine Thin Kyi, Khine Hnin Wai
2010	Yin Bat Kyee Ne Chit Lai Me	Wah Wah Win Shwe	Moe Hay Ko, Nyunt Win, Yan Aung, Wah Wah Win Shwe, Thar Htoo
2010	A May Kyay Zu Satt Phu Chin Tal	Khin Saw Myo	Thet Mon Myint, Nay Aung, May Than Nu, Wah Wah Aung
2010	Nat Phat Tae Sone Twal Myar	Ko Zaw (Ar Yone Oo)	Eaindra Kyaw Zin, Thet Mon Myint, Nyi Nanda
2010	Kyauk Thin Pone Tway Moe Htar Tae Eain	Ko Zaw (Ar Yone Oo)	Kyaw Ye Aung, Thet Mon Myint
2011	Adam, Eve and Datsa	Wyne	Sai Sai Kham Leng, Thet Mon Myint
2012	May Khin Kanyar	Ko Zaw (Aryon Oo)	Yan Aung, Ye Aung, Khant Sithu, Kyaw Kyaw Bo, Eaindra Kyaw Zin, Soe Myat Thuzar, Wutt Hmone Shwe Yi, Thinzar Wint Kyaw
2012	Hna Pin Lain Tae Yee Sar Sar	Nyi Nyi Htun Lwin	Yan Aung, Ye Aung, Kyaw Kyaw Bo, Myint Myint Khine, Soe Myat Thuzar, Khine Hnin Wai, Wutt Hmone Shwe Yi.
2012	Thwar Lu Soe Dar Myo Taw Tat Tal	Nyi Nyi Htun Lwin	Kyaw Ye Aung, Nay Min, Soe Myat Thuzar, Eaindra Kyaw Zin, Pearl Win
2012	Red Cotton Silk Flower	Wyne	Phway Phway
2013	As U Like	Wyne	Wutt Hmone Shwe Yi
2013	White Castle	Ko Zaw (Ar Yone Oo)	Nay Toe, Eaindra Kyaw Zin
2014	Modern Yazawin	Nyi Nyi Htun Lwin	Khant Sithu, Wai Lu Kyaw, Khin Hlaing, Wutt Hmone Shwe Yi, Htun Eaindra Bo, Sandi Myint Lwin
2014	Ko Tint Toh Super Yat Kwat	Kyaw Zaw Lin	Many actors
2014	Made in Heart	Wyne	Moe Hay Ko, Wutt Hmone Shwe Yi
2014	By Coincidence	Maung Myo Min	Moe Hay Ko, Laila Khan
2015	Lu Gyi Min Khin Byar	Nyi Nyi Htun Lwin	Wutt Hmone Shwe Yi, Zin Wine
2015	Mingalar Hlae	Ko Zaw (Ar Yone Oo)	Khant Si Thu, Nay Min, Soe Myat Thuzar, Moe Hay Ko
2015	Chit San Eain 2028	Hein Soe	Lu Min, Htun Eaindra Bo, Nay Toe, Moe Hay Ko, Min Maw Kun, Wutt Hmone Shwe Yi, Nay Min, Chit Thu Wai, Htun Htun, Thinza Wint Kyaw, Myint Myat, Soe Pyae Thazin
2016	Bago Sarr Hnint Thu Ei Virus Myarr	Kyaw Zaw Lin	Patricia, Soe Myat Thuzar, Yaza Ne Win, Yan Aung, Kyaw Ye Aung
2017	Yazawin Yine Thu Myar	Maung Myo Min	Patricia, Laila Kham, Myint Myat
2017	A Ywal Thone Parr Chit Tat Thee	Maung Myo Min	Wutt Hmone Shwe Yi, Yan Aung, Moht Moht Myint Aung, Kyaw Ye Aung, Khine Thin Kyi, May Thinza Oo, Kyaw Kyaw
2017	Yin Bat Htae Ka Dar	Maung Myo Min	Eaindra Kyaw Zin, Htun Eaindra Bo, Myat Kaythi Aung
2017	Nay Win Ate Tan Tat	Wyne	Paing Phyo Thu, Htun Eaindra Bo
2017	TT & Donut	Adsajun Sattagovit	Chattarika Sittiprom, Suphawit Muongmee, Shwe Thamee, Chai Khunsriluxsa
2017	Kat Pi Ya	Ko Zaw (Ar Yone Oo)	Phway Phway, Kaung Pyae
2018	Toe Kyaw Man Nae Nan San Tae Ywar	Kyaw Thar Gyi	Kyaw Ye Aung, Bay Lu Wa, Aye Myat Thu, Thinzar Wint Kyaw
2018	Yite Sar	Mite Tee	Khin Hlaing, Bay Lu Wa, Ayeyar, Soe Myat Thuzar, Moe Di
2018	Tasay Par Lar Pyi	R. Peraks	Ei Chaw Po, Nyi Htut Khaung, Khin Hlaing, Aung Zaw Min
2019	Nyit Toon	Lu Min	Eaindra Kyaw Zin,Khine Thin Kyi, Lu Min
2019	LadyBoy	Ko Pauk	Kyaw Kyaw Bo, Htoo Aung, Ei Chaw Po, Kaew Korravee, Khin Hlaing, Joker, Bank, P Nok, K Nyi, Nyaung Nyaung
2019	Two Weeks Notice	Maung Myo Min	Wutt Hmone Shwe Yi, Min Oo, Kyaw Kyaw Bo, Aye Myat Thu
2019	The Three Men, She Loves	Maung Myo Min	Yan Aung, Min Oo, Min Phone Myat, Moht Moht Myint Aung, Eaindra Kyaw Zin, Nan Sandar Hla Htun, Emily Bo
2020	Kan Ma Pha La	Pan Chi Soe Moe	Min Maw Kun, Moe Hay Ko, Soe Pyae Thazin, Aye Myat Thu, Zin Wine
2020	Golden Princess	Mee Pwar	Kyaw Kyaw Bo, Kaung Pyae, Zin Wine, Cho Pyone, May Thinza Oo, Soe Pyae Thazin
2022	The Butterfly Trap	Wyne	Phway Phway

== Awards and nominations ==
Year	Award	Category	Nominated work	Result
2010	Myanmar Motion Picture Academy Awards	Best Actor	Adam, Eve and Datsa	Won
2010	Myanmar Motion Picture Academy Awards	Best Actor	A May Kyay Zu Satt Phu Chin Tal	Nominated
2012	Myanmar Motion Picture Academy Awards	Best Actor	Red Cotton Silk Flower	Won
2013	Myanmar Motion Picture Academy Awards	Best Actor	As U Like	Won
2013	Myanmar Motion Picture Academy Awards	Best Actor	White Castle	Nominated
2014	Myanmar Motion Picture Academy Awards	Best Actor	Made in Heart	Won
2014	Myanmar Motion Picture Academy Awards	Best Actor	By Coincidence	Nominated
2015	Myanmar Motion Picture Academy Awards	Best Actor	Lu Gyi Min Khin Byar	Nominated
2016	Myanmar Motion Picture Academy Awards	Best Actor	Yazawin Yine Thu Myar	Nominated
2017	Myanmar Motion Picture Academy Awards	Best Actor	Yin Bat Htae Ka Dar	Nominated
2020	Myanmar Motion Picture Academy Awards	Best Actor	Kan Ma Pha La	Nominated
2022	Myanmar Motion Picture Academy Awards	Best Actor	The Butterfly Trap	Won
