= Wutt Hmone Shwe Yi =

Burmese actress and model

- ဝတ်မှုံရွှေရည်
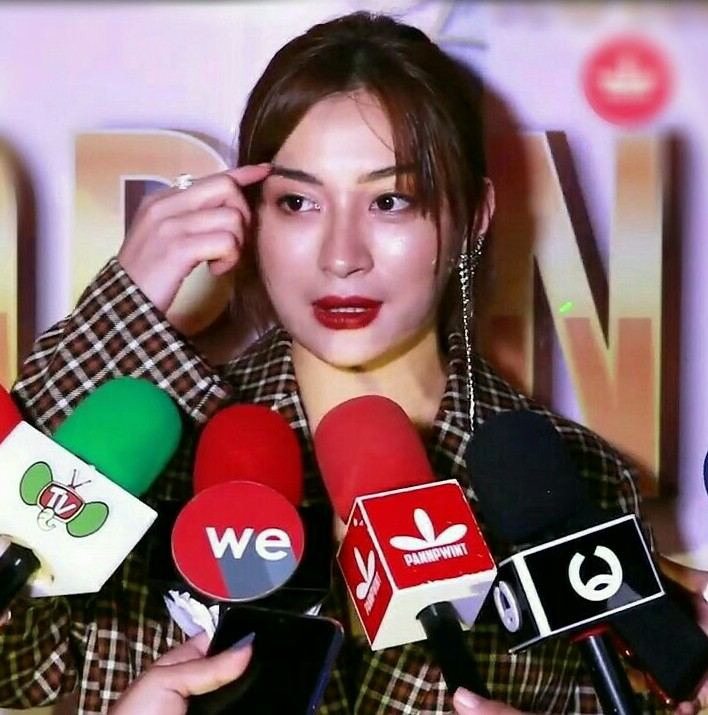
- Born: 10 August 1988 (age 38); Mogok, Mandalay Division, Socialist Republic of the Union of Burma (now Mogok, Mandalay Region Myanmar)
- Education: Dagon University (English major)
- Occupation: Actress
- Years active: 2005–present
- Height: 5 ft 3 in (160 cm)
- Spouse: Naing Phyo Kyaw (m. 2023)
- Parent(s): Win Thein Naing; Mi Mi Lwin
- Awards: Myanmar Motion Picture Academy Awards (Best Actress for 2013, Best Supporting Actress for 2014, Best Actress for 2024)

Wutt Hmone Shwe Yi (Burmese: ဝတ်မှုန်ရွှေရည်, pronounced [wʊʔ m̥òʊɰ̃ ʃwè jì], sometimes anglicized as Wut Hmone Shwe Yi; born on 10 August 1988) is a Burmese actress. She is recognized as Myanmar's highest-paid actress according to records. Also she is considered the most commercially successful actress in Burmese cinemas.

She has received three Myanmar Academy Awards, for Best Actress in 2013 for her performance in As U Like, and for Best Supporting Actress in 2014 for her performance in Made in Heart. In 2020, she was featured on Forbes Asia's 100 Digital Stars List, highlighting the most influential celebrities on social media in the Asia-Pacific region.

== Early life and education ==
Wutt Hmone Shwe Yi was born on 10 August 1988 in Mogok to Win Thein Naing and Nang Mi Mi Lwin, of Shan descent. She is the eldest daughter and has a younger sister named Nadi Shwe Yi. She attended BEHS 2 Kamayut (St. Augustine) and graduated from Dagon University with a Bachelor's degree in English.

== Career ==
After completing her university education, she initially contributed to Teen Magazine and Beauty Magazine. Subsequently, she featured in commercial billboards and magazines promoting Kanebo cosmetics. Her foray into acting began through advertisements in 2005, and she garnered increased recognition through campaigns for brands like Kanebo and Hometex. In 2008, she made her debut in films and achieved notable success. She took on her first female leading role in the 2013 film As U Like where she starred alongside Pyay Ti Oo, and she earned the Myanmar Academy Award for Best Actress for her performance in the film.

In 2013, The Myanmar Times named her one of the 50 Outstanding Myanmar Women. In 2014, she was named a brand ambassador for Huawei.

Wutt Hmone Shwe Yi's advertisements dominate a significant portion of billboards and advertising space in Yangon, occupying up to half of the available display areas. From 2008 to present, she has acted in over 300 TV commercials, 200 direct-to-videos and 60 films in her career. In 2016, she co-starred with Sai Sai Kham Hlaing in the film If Lover Was a Flower, reigniting public interest as they played characters who were once real-life lovers, reuniting on screen after their past breakup. She also played the lead role in the 2016 film From Bangkok to Mandalay, which was filmed in both Myanmar and Thailand.

In 2018, she represented the Loreal Paris Myanmar cosmetics brand alongside beauty blogger Nay Chi Oo at the Paris Fashion Week 2018 event in France.

In 2019, she starred in the film The Only Mom, which was directed by Thai director Chartchai Ketnust. It told the story of a Burmese family that moved into a colonial-era haunted house. In 2019, she received the "Asia Special Award" at the Asia Model Festival 2019. She organized the Kit Fans Meeting in 2019, drawing a gathering of a thousand fans.

In 2020, she served as a judge representing Myanmar at the Bangkok International Documentary Film Awards. She collaborated with the renowned international clothing and fashion brand Emporio Armani. She was recognized in the Stars of 2020 by The Irrawaddy for her contributions to the people during the COVID-19 pandemic in Myanmar.

== Political activities ==
In the aftermath of the 2021 Myanmar coup d'état, she changed her profile image to a red square, symbolizing the color of the National League for Democracy (NLD), and stood in solidarity with other Myanmar citizens using the hashtag #CivilDisobedienceCampaign before changing her profile picture again. Alongside this update, she conveyed the message, "I support civil disobedience movements". She actively participated in protests alongside other well-known actors and public figures. She joined the people's rally protest held in front of the American Embassy in Yangon on February 10, 2021.

Despite her initial involvement, public opinion gradually turned against her, with critics contending that she had not done enough for the cause. This sentiment intensified when she married Naing Phyo Kyaw, a tycoon linked to the military, in November 2023. This decision drew criticism from activists, further making her a target of a social punishment movement.

== Personal life ==
She is the cousin of actress Phway Phway. Her relationship with Sai Sai Kham Leng was one of the most captivating connections in the Burmese celebrity sphere. However, after several years, they decided to part ways.

On 17 November 2023, Wutt Hmone Shwe Yi married Naing Phyo Kyaw, the chairman of MG Myanmar, a co-founder of 7th Sense Creation, and vice president at Green Circle Company, the producer of VeVe beverages in Myanmar. Naing Phyo Kyaw is a close associate of Khin Thiri Thet Mon, the daughter of Senior General Min Aung Hlaing, who has led Myanmar's military junta since the 2021 Myanmar coup d'état. Due to his close ties to the Burmese military, activists have called for a boycott of the couple. She is the sister-in-law of Moe Set Wine through her marriage to Naing Phyo Kyaw.

== Donations ==
Wutt Hmone Shwe Yi participated in actor Pyay Ti Oo's Pyay Ti Oo Foundation Fund Raising Concert for students on December 4, 2011. She donated all her artist fees to the foundation.

On February 1, 2015, she donated the golden star from her academy award to the Aungzabu Tawya Monastery in Hmawbi Township, Yangon. During the COVID-19 pandemic, she actively contributed by making numerous donations to elderly individuals facing financial hardship within the movie industry. In the second wave of the pandemic, she and her team donated the masks they produced to people in need.

== Publications ==
On August 14, 2011, she released her photo album titled "The Portfolio of Hmone Hmone". Subsequently, on August 31, 2014, she introduced her first limited collection, a handmade pillow kit. On October 21, she launched her second limited collection, Scarfs. Her third limited collection, featuring brooch, earrings, and necklace, was unveiled on July 8, 2015. MiniKitKit was launched on March 9, 2016.

== Filmography ==
=== Film (cinema) ===
Lists of movies
Year	Film	Director	Co-Stars	Role	Notes
2012	May Khin Kanyar	Ko Zaw (Ar Yone Oo)	Yan Aung, Ye Aung, Khant Si Thu, Kyaw Kyaw Bo, Eaindra Kyaw Zin, Soe Myat Thuzar, Pyay Ti Oo, Thinzar Wint Kyaw	Chit Chit	
2012	Hna Pin Lain Tae Yee Sar Sar	Nyi Nyi Htun Lwin	Yan Aung, Ye Aung, Pyay Ti Oo, Kyaw Kyaw Bo, Myint Myint Khine, Soe Myat Thuzar, Khine Hnin Wai	Nadi	
2012	A Lan Lun A Lun Lan	Nyi Nyi Tun Lwin	Nay Toe, Thinzar Wint Kyaw, Melody, Soe Pyae Thazin, Nan Su Yati Soe, Christina, Chan Mi Mi Ko	May Tha Ra	
2013	A Mike Sar (The Awesome Shawties)	Ko Zaw (Ar Yone Oo)	Khant Si Thu, Thu Htoo San, Kyaw Kyaw Bo, Moe Aung Yin, Soe Myat Thuzar, Thinzar Wint Kyaw, Soe Pyae Thazin, Nan Su Yati Soe	Hmone Hmone	
2013	A Lan Zayar 2	Nyi Nyi Tun Lwin	Moe Aung Yin, Aung Ye Lin, Moe Yu San, Nan Su Yati Soe, Chan Me Me Ko	Hsaung Kabyar	
2013	A Htar A Thit Nae Hna Khar Chit Mal	Nyi Nyi Tun Lwin	Min Maw Kun, Chit Thu Wai	Mya Thway Khett	
2013	As U Like	Wyne	Pyay Ti Oo	Wutt Yi Cho/Gar Gar	Won the Best Actress Myanmar Academy Awards
2014	39 Bite Pu	Nyunt Myanmar Nyi Nyi Aung	Nay Toe, Wai Lu Kyaw	Sunny	
2014	Mar Kyi Shay	Mite Tee	Moe Aung Yin, Ye Aung, Soe Myat Thuzar	Nan	
2014	Endless Love	Thein Han Phoenix	Nay Toe	Twe Tar Oo/Yu Par	
2014	Modern Yazawin	Nyi Nyi Tun Lwin	Pyay Ti Oo, Khant Si Thu, Wai Lu Kyaw, Htun Eaindra Bo, Sandi Myint Lwin		
2014	Made in Heart	Wyne	Pyay Ti Oo, Moe Hay Ko	Me Me Ye Ye Ni	Won the Best Supporting Actress Myanmar Academy Awards
2014	Ko Tint Toh Super Yat Kwat	Kyaw Zaw Lin	Yan Aung, Ye Aung, Lu Min, Min Maw Kun, Pyay Ti Oo, Nay Toe, Myint Myat, Aung Ye Lin, Soe Myat Thuzar, Eaindra Kyaw Zin, Thet Mon Myint, Phway Phway, Sandi Myint Lwin		
2015	Lu Gyi Min Khin Byar	Nyi Nyi Tun Lwin	Pyay Ti Oo		
2015	Chit San Eain 2028	Hein Soe	Lu Min, Min Maw Kun, Nay Toe, Tun Tun, Pyay Ti Oo, Myint Myat, Nay Min, Htun Eaindra Bo, Eaindra Kyaw Zin, Chit Thu Wai, Moe Hay Ko, Soe Pyae Thazin, Thinzar Wint Kyaw		
2016	Anubis	Lu Min	Lu Min, Nay Toe, Shwe Hmone Yati		
2016	My Lovely Hate	Wyne	Aung Ye Lin, Thet Mon Myint, Zin Wine	A Mhone	
2016	From Bangkok to Mandalay	Chartchai Ketnust ( Thai director )	Nay Toe, Sai Sai Kham Leng, Naam Whan Pailporn	Thu Zar	
2017	Jone Jone Jat Jat	Ko Zaw (Ar Yone Oo)	Sai Sai Kham Leng, Wutt Hmone Shwe Yi, Soe Myat Thuzar, Nay Dway		
2017	Kyun	Nyut Myanmar Nyi Nyi Aung	Nay Toe, Myint Myat	Khin Min Kha	
2017	A Ywal Thone Parr Chit Tat Thee	Maung Myo Min	Pyay Ti Oo, Yan Aung, Moht Moht Myint Aung, Kyaw Ye Aung, Khine Thin Kyi, May Thinzar Oo, Kyaw Kyaw		
2017	La Yaung Phyar Tae Inle Mhar	Nyunt Myanmar Nyi Nyi Aung	Nay Toe, Wah Zin, Hsu Myat Noe Oo		
2018	My Country My Home	Kyi Phyu Shin	Aung Ye Lin, Win Morisaki	Nann Hat Khay	
2018	Kiss Like Wine	Aung Myat	Aung Ye Lin, Soe Myat Thuzar		
2018	Reflection	Lu Min	Htun Eaindra Bo, Eaindra Kyaw Zin, Patricia		
2018	Yan Thu	Mee Pwar	Nay Min, Nay Chi Oo	San Kyal	
2019	The Only Mom	Chartchai Ketnust ( Thai director )	Nine Nine, Daung, Pyae Pyae, Su Yadana	May Hnin	
2019	Dan Dar Yee Moe	Win Lwin Htet	Ye Deight,Daung,Shwe Htoo	Moe Hnaung	
2019	Hero	Perakas Rajaram ( Malaysian director )	Myint Myat		
2019	Two Weeks Notice	Maung Myo Min	Pyay Ti Oo, Min Oo, Kyaw Kyaw Bo, Aye Myat Thu		
2019	A Flower Above The Clouds	Sin Yaw Mg Mg	Ryu Sang Wook, Kyaw Htet Aung, May Than Nu		
2019	Mingalar Katin	Ko Zaw (Ar Yone Oo)	Myint Myat, Kyaw Kyaw Bo		
2020	Myet Nu	Pwint Theingi Zaw	Nay Toe		
2024	If My Lover Were a Flower	Kaung Zan	Sai Sai Kham Leng	Mya Lay Shin	
2024	The Art Of Cloud(Tein Pan Chi)	Pwint Theingi Zaw	Aye Chan Maung,Nay Myo Aung,Melody	Tein Pan Chi,Kyal Sin	Won the Best Actress Myanmar Academy Awards
2025	Nat Win The	Win Lwin Htet	A Lin Yaung,Charlie,Myo Thandar Htun	Lay Ngum	
2026	Ywar Gaw	Ko Zaw(Ar Yone Oo)	Pyay Ti Oo,Khant Si Thu, Thin Zar Wint Kyaw		
2026	Price Of Love	Pyae Phyo Naing	Nine Nine,Nay Toe	Shin Min	
TBA	Nat Win The 2	Win Lwin Htet	Aye Chan Maung,Aung Yay Chan		

=== Series ===
Lists of movies
Year	Series	Burmese title	Director	Co-Stars
2025	Venus Luck	နတ်သမီးနက္ခတ်	Pwint Theingi Zaw	Tyron,Aye Chan Maung,Aung Ye Htike,Henry San,Hein Thit Sa,Kira

=== Direct-to-video ===
Lists of Movies
Year	Film	Directors	Co-Stars
2009	Barbie A Yote Kalay	Kyi Phyu Shin	Aung Ye Lin
2009	Nat Tha Mee Chit Tae Pin Lal	Mg Aung	Nay Toe, Su Shun Lai
2009	Phay Chit	Mg Aung	Lu Min
2009	Pound 200 Ko Chit Thu	Kyi Phyu Shin	Aung Ye Lin, Pwint
2009	Uncle Phay Phay	Nyi Nyi Tun Lwin	Lu Min
2009	Anay Ahtai Ma Tat Tae Kyal		Nay Toe
2010	Chin Khwin	Ku Tho	Nay Toe, Htun Eindra Bo
2010	Wut Hmone Myaw Tae Late Pyar	Mg Myo Min	Sai Sai Kham Hlaing
2010	Achit Nhit Anee Ta Wite Thar Yar Myi	Nyunt Myanmar Nyi Nyi Aung	Nay Toe
2010	Achit Ko Ya Chin B	Ko Zaw	Khant Si Thu
2010	Pin Lal Twist	Mg Aung	Moe Aung Yin
2011	Wut Hmone Wine Ei Apyin Sar Ya Tha	Kyaw Zaw Lin	Pyay Ti Oo
2011	Ein Mat Ei Ta Phat Chan Mhar	Tharr Gyi	Aung Ye Lin
2011	Yu Yu Mu Mu Yin Htae Ka Oo	Soe Kyaw San	Lu Min
2011	21 Yar Su Cinderella	Kyi Phyu Shin	Aung Ye Lin
2011	Ba Won Daw Dot Com	Kyaw Zaw Lin	Nay Toe
2011	Ma Soe Par Nae Kg Ma Lay	Ma Li Kha Soe Htike Aung	Sai Sai Kham Leng
2011	Kyun Taw Chitthu Nae Thu Ma Ei Sponsor Ko Ko	Tharr Gyi	Min Maw Kun
2011	Shwe Lin Ban Nae Pann Kan Thu	Ko Zaw (Arr Yone Oo)	Pyay Ti Oo
2011	Tane Nyo Si Tae Pann Ka Kyo	Ko Zaw (Arr Yone Oo)	Khant Si Thu
2011	Sate Chauk Chin The Kyan Mar Yay Ko Soe Ywar Swar Hti Khite Say The	Ma Li Kha Soe Htike Aung	Sai Sai Kham Leng
2011	Achit Ka Sarr Tal	Mite Tee	Hein Wai Yan
2011	Yone Kyi Chin Hnin Si	Ko Zaq (Arr Yone Oo)	Pyay Ti Oo, Chaw Yadanar
2011	Chit Mal So Tar Kyi Pae	Kyaw Zaw Lin	Aung Ye Lin
2011	Ngar Aphay Gyi Taw Lite Tar	Hein Soe	Lu Min
2011	Nint	Ko Zaw (Arr Yone Oo)	Pyay Ti Oo
2011	Shwe Lin Ban Nae Pan Kan Thu	Ko Zaw	Pyay Ti Oo
2011	Chit Mal So Tar Kyi Pal	Kyaw Zaw Lin	Aung Ye Lin
2011	Pyan Lar Par Ko Ko	Win Tun Tun	Nay Toe
2011	Nint	Ko Zaw	Pyay Ti Oo
2011	Di Kg Ma Lay Atwet	Wyne(Own Creator)	Pyay Ti Oo
2011	Pa Hta Ma Sone Chit Tar Nin	Nyi Nyi Tun Lwin	Pyay Ti Oo
2011	Kyal Kyway Pone Pyin	Win Tun Tun	Nay Toe

== Awards and nominations ==
=== Myanmar Academy Awards ===
Year	Category	Nominated work	Result
2013	Best Actress	As U Like	Won
2014	Best Supporting Actress	Made in Heart	Won
2015	Best Actress	Lu Gyi Min Khin Byar	Nominated
2016	Best Actress	My Lovely Hate	Nominated
2017	Best Actress	Kyun	Nominated
2018	Best Actress	Yan Thu	Nominated
2019	Best Actress	The Only Mom	Nominated
2020	Best Actress	Myet Nu	Nominated
2024	Best Actress	The Art Of Cloud (Tein Pan Chi)	Won
2025	Best Actress	Nat Win The	Nominated

=== Star Awards ===
Year	Category	Nominated work	Result
2018	Best Actress in a Leading Role	My Country My Home	Nominated
2018	Fashion Star ( Female )	Wutt Hmone Shwe Yi	Won

=== Asia Model Festival Awards ===
Year	Category	Nominated work	Result
2019	Asia Special Award	Wutt Hmone Shwe Yi	Won

=== Asian Academy Creative Awards ===
Year	Category	Nominated work	Result
2019	Best Actress in a Leading Role (regional winner)	The Only Mom	Nominated

=== Suphannahong National Film Awards ===
Year	Category	Nominated work	Result
2017	Best Actress in a Supporting Role	From Bangkok to Mandalay	Nominated
