= Mingalar Hlae =

2015 Burmese film

- film poster
- Burmese: မင်္ဂလာလှည်း
- Directed by: Ko Zaw (Ar Yone Oo)
- Screenplay by: Nay Soe Thaw
- Based on: Mingalar Hlae by Khin Khin Htoo
- Produced by: Khayanpyar
- Starring: Khant Si Thu; Pyay Ti Oo; Nay Min; Soe Myat Thuzar; Moe Hay Ko
- Cinematography: Maung Myint; Aye Min
- Edited by: Thant Zaw Htun
- Music by: Khin Maung Gyi
- Production company: Khayay Phyu Film Production
- Release date: February 20, 2015
- Running time: 120 minutes
- Country: Myanmar
- Language: Burmese

Mingalar Hlae (Burmese: မင်္ဂလာလှည်း) is a 2015 Burmese comedy-drama film, directed by Ko Zaw (Ar Yone Oo) starring Khant Si Thu, Pyay Ti Oo, Nay Min, Soe Myat Thuzar and Moe Hay Ko. The film, produced by Khayay Phyu Film Production premiered Myanmar on February 20, 2015.

== Cast ==
- Khant Si Thu as Kyaw Than
- Pyay Ti Oo as Maung Kyaing
- Nay Min as Thaung Sein
- Soe Myat Thuzar as Daw Soon Ma
- Moe Hay Ko as Aye Thi
