= Thwar Lu Soe Dar Myo Taw Tat Tal =

2012 Burmese Film

- Film Poster
- Burmese: သွားလူဆိုးဒါမျိုးတော့တတ်တယ်
- Directed by: Nyi Nyi Htun Lwin
- Screenplay by: Lwin Min Eant
- Based on: Mu Di Tar Pan Oo Maung Ma Khu Nae by Hnin Wai Nyein
- Starring: Kyaw Ye Aung; Pyay Ti Oo; Nay Min; Soe Myat Thuzar; Eaindra Kyaw Zin; Pearl Win
- Cinematography: Than Nyunt (Pan Thar)
- Edited by: Aung Thwin; Htun Htun Oo
- Music by: Khin Maung Gyi
- Production company: Dawei Film Production
- Release date: July 6, 2012
- Running time: 116 minutes
- Country: Myanmar
- Language: Burmese

Thwar Lu Soe Dar Myo Taw Tat Tal (Burmese: သွားလူဆိုးဒါမျိုးတော့တတ်တယ်) is a 2012 Burmese drama film, directed by Nyi Nyi Htun Lwin starring Kyaw Ye Aung, Pyay Ti Oo, Nay Min, Soe Myat Thuzar, Eaindra Kyaw Zin and Pearl Win.

== Cast ==
- Kyaw Ye Aung as U Htun Khine
- Pyay Ti Oo as Maung Maung Latt
- Nay Min as Nay Min
- Soe Myat Thuzar as Daw Tin May
- Eaindra Kyaw Zin as Mu Di Tar
- Pearl Win as Pan Eu
- Bay Lu Wa as U Kyauk Tine
- Khin Hlaing as Yin Maung
- Khin Soe Paing as Daw Swal Mi
- Khine Tin as U Myint Aung
