= Kan Ma Pha La =

2020 Burmese film

- film poster
- Burmese: ကမ္မဖလ
- Directed by: Pan Gyi Soe Moe
- Screenplay by: Nyein Min
- Based on: Kan Ma Pha La by Tint Tal
- Starring: Min Maw Kun; Pyay Ti Oo; Moe Hay Ko; Soe Pyae Thazin; Aye Myat Thu; Zin Wine
- Production company: Pwal Khin Film Production
- Release date: January 2, 2020
- Running time: 120 minutes
- Country: Myanmar
- Language: Burmese

Kan Ma Pha La (Burmese: ကမ္မဖလ) is a 2020 Burmese drama film, directed by Pan Gyi Soe Moe starring Min Maw Kun, Pyay Ti Oo, Moe Hay Ko, Soe Pyae Thazin, Aye Myat Thu and Zin Wine. The film, produced by Pwal Khin Film Production premiered Myanmar on January 2, 2020.

== Cast ==
- Pyay Ti Oo as Kan Kaung
- Min Maw Kun as U Sein Maung
- Moe Hay Ko as A Hmi
- Soe Pyae Thazin as A Thant
- Aye Myat Thu as Saw Hla
- Zin Wine as U Nakee
- Yan Kyaw as U Thant Sin
- Thi Yati as Daw Phyu Nu
- Soe Yan Aung as Sein Kyi Aung
- Soe Thiha as Nyein Aung
