= May Khin Kanyar =

2012 Burmese film

- film poster
- Burmese: မေခင်ကညာ
- Directed by: Ko Zaw (Ar Yone Oo)
- Screenplay by: Nay Soe Thaw
- Based on: Chit Tan Kasar Kya Thu Myar by Ponnya Khin
- Produced by: Ko Thet; Ma Sandi
- Starring: Yan Aung; Khant Si Thu; Pyay Ti Oo; Kyaw Kyaw Bo; Soe Myat Thuzar; Eaindra Kyaw Zin; Wutt Hmone Shwe Yi; Thinzar Wint Kyaw
- Production company: Shwe Min Thamee Film Production
- Release date: 2012
- Running time: 120 minutes
- Country: Myanmar
- Language: Burmese

May Khin Kanyar (Burmese: မေခင်ကညာ) is a 2012 Burmese comedy-drama film, directed by Ko Zaw (Ar Yone Oo) starring Yan Aung, Khant Si Thu, Pyay Ti Oo, Kyaw Kyaw Bo, Soe Myat Thuzar, Eaindra Kyaw Zin, Wutt Hmone Shwe Yi and Thinzar Wint Kyaw. The film, produced by Shwe Min Thamee Film Production premiered Myanmar on 2012.

== Cast ==
- Yan Aung as U Bala
- Khant Si Thu as San Thar Yaung
- Pyay Ti Oo as Nyan Thar Yaung
- Kyaw Kyaw Bo as Kan Thar Yaung
- Soe Myat Thuzar as Daw Pearl
- Eaindra Kyaw Zin as May Khin Kanyar
- Wutt Hmone Shwe Yi as Chit Chit
- Thinzar Wint Kyaw as Shwe Sin
- Khin Hlaing as Mutu
- Aye Mya Phyu (Cameo)
