= Mingalar Katin =

2019 Burmese film

- Film Poster
- Burmese: မင်္ဂလာခုတင်
- Directed by: Ko Zaw (Ar Yone Oo)
- Screenplay by: Shoon Mi Mi Htet
- Produced by: Ma Aye Aye Win
- Starring: Myint Myat; Wutt Hmone Shwe Yi; Kyaw Kyaw Bo; Khin Zarchi Kyaw; Khin Hlaing; Ko Pauk
- Cinematography: Maung Myint; Nyein Chan
- Edited by: Kyi Thar
- Production company: Lucky Seven Film Production
- Release date: August 10, 2018 (Myanmar)
- Running time: 108 minutes
- Country: Myanmar
- Language: Burmese

Mingalar Katin (Burmese: မင်္ဂလာခုတင်) is a 2018 Burmese Comedy-drama film, directed by Ko Zaw (Ar Yone Oo) starring Myint Myat, Wutt Hmone Shwe Yi, Kyaw Kyaw Bo, Khin Zarchi Kyaw, Khin Hlaing and Ko Pauk.The film, produced by Lucky Seven Film Production premiered in Myanmar on August 10, 2018.

== Cast ==
- Myint Myat as Chit Khin
- Wutt Hmone Shwe Yi as May Phyu
- Kyaw Kyaw Bo as Pay Toe
- Khin Zarchi Kyaw as Daw Win Win
- Khin Hlaing as Pauk Si
- Ko Pauk as U Ba Pyu
