= Yite Sar =

2018 Burmese film

- film poster
- Burmese: ရိုက်စား
- Directed by: Mite Tee
- Screenplay by: Gout Gyi
- Starring: Pyay Ti Oo; Khin Hlaing; Soe Myat Thuzar; Moe Di; Bay Lu Wa; Ayeyar; Libby Jennings
- Edited by: Aung Ko
- Production company: Lucky Seven Film Productionp
- Release date: September 21, 2018
- Running time: 120 minutes
- Country: Myanmar
- Language: Burmese

Yite Sar (Burmese: ရိုက်စား) is a 2018 Burmese comedy film, directed by Mite Tee starring Pyay Ti Oo, Khin Hlaing, Soe Myat Thuzar, Moe Di, Bay Lu Wa, Ayeyar and Libby Jennings. The film, produced by Lucky Seven Film Production premiered Myanmar on September 21, 2018.

== Cast ==
- Pyay Ti Oo as Ba Kyaw
- Khin Hlaing as Fighter
- Soe Myat Thuzar as Soe Myat Thuzar
- Moe Di as U Tin Shwe
- Bay Lu Wa as Bay Lu Wa
- Ayeyar as Ayeyar
- Libby Jennings as Libby
