= Chit San Eain 2028 =

2015 Burmese film

- film poster
- Burmese: ချစ်စံအိမ်၂၀၂၈
- Directed by: Hein Soe
- Screenplay by: Nay Soe Thaw
- Story by: Nay Soe Thaw
- Starring: Lu Min; Htun Eaindra Bo; Pyay Ti Oo; Eaindra Kyaw Zin; Nay Toe; Moe Hay Ko; Min Maw Kun; Wutt Hmone Shwe Yi; Nay Min; Chit Thu Wai; Htun Htun; Thinzar Wint Kyaw; Myint Myat; Soe Pyae Thazin
- Cinematography: Than Nyunt (Pann Thar)
- Edited by: Zaw Min (Hanthar Myay)
- Music by: Khin Maung Gyi
- Production company: Thinkayta Film Production
- Release date: May 15, 2015
- Running time: 120 minutes
- Country: Myanmar
- Language: Burmese

Chit San Eain 2028 (Burmese: ချစ်စံအိမ်၂၀၂၈) is a 2015 Burmese comedy-drama film, directed by Hein Soe starring Lu Min, Htun Eaindra Bo, Pyay Ti Oo, Eaindra Kyaw Zin, Nay Toe, Moe Hay Ko, Min Maw Kun, Wutt Hmone Shwe Yi, Nay Min, Chit Thu Wai, Htun Htun, Thinzar Wint Kyaw, Myint Myat and Soe Pyae Thazin. The film, produced by Thinkayta Film Production premiered Myanmar on May 15, 2015.

== Cast ==
- Lu Min as Ko Oo
- Htun Eaindra Bo as Moe Pwint
- Pyay Ti Oo as Ko Phu
- Eaindra Kyaw Zin as Sue
- Nay Toe as Ko Latt
- Moe Hay Ko as Shin Nyein
- Min Maw Kun as Ko Toe
- Wutt Hmone Shwe Yi as Wah Wah
- Nay Min as Ko Hnaung
- Chit Thu Wai as Thet Lyar
- Htun Htun as Ko Htwe
- Thinzar Wint Kyaw as Lint Lint
- Myint Myat as Ko Nge
- Soe Pyae Thazin as Thuzar
- Aung Lwin as Ba Gyi
- Nwet Nwet San as Daw Kyay Yone
