= Kyauk Thin Pone Tway Moe Htar Tae Eain =

2010 Burmese film

- film poster
- Burmese: ကျောက်သင်ပုန်းတွေမိုးထားတဲ့အိမ်
- Directed by: Ko Zaw (Ar Yone Oo)
- Screenplay by: Ko Shwe Moe Thet; Moe Kyaw (MKA)
- Based on: Kyauk Thin Pone Tway Moe Htar Tae Eain by A Kyi Taw
- Starring: Kyaw Ye Aung; Pyay Ti Oo; Htoo Khant Kyaw; Soe Myat Thuzar; Thet Mon Myint; Chaw Yadanar; Khin Hlaing
- Production company: Shwe Taung Yadanar Film Production
- Release date: September 10, 2010
- Running time: 120 minutes
- Country: Myanmar
- Language: Burmese

Kyauk Thin Pone Tway Moe Htar Tae Eain (Burmese: ကျောက်သင်ပုန်းတွေမိုးထားတဲ့အိမ်) is a 2010 Burmese comedy-drama film, directed by Ko Zaw (Ar Yone Oo) starring Kyaw Ye Aung, Pyay Ti Oo, Htoo Khant Kyaw, Soe Myat Thuzar, Thet Mon Myint, Chaw Yadanar and Khin Hlaing. The film, produced by Shwe Taung Yadanar Film Production premiered Myanmar on September 10, 2010.

== Cast ==
- Kyaw Ye Aung as Phay Than
- Pyay Ti Oo as Thaw Tar Phone
- Htoo Khant Kyaw as Ko Oak
- Soe Myat Thuzar as Shwe Nwe
- Thet Mon Myint as Mi Chaw
- Chaw Yadanar as Thidar Win
- Khin Hlaing as Ko San
