= Hero (2019 Burmese film) =

2019 Burmese romantic action film

- Film Poster
- Burmese: ဟီးရိုး
- Directed by: R. Perekas
- Produced by: Ma Aye Aye Win
- Starring: Myint Myat; Wutt Hmone Shwe Yi; Khin Hlaing; Zin Wine; Nay Naw
- Cinematography: Kamal
- Edited by: Tinesh
- Production company: Lucky Seven Film Production
- Release date: November 21, 2019 (Myanmar)
- Running time: 124 minutes
- Country: Myanmar
- Language: Burmese

Hero (Burmese: ဟီးရိုး) is a 2019 Burmese romantic action film, directed by R. Perekas starring Myint Myat, Wutt Hmone Shwe Yi, Khin Hlaing and Nay Naw. The film, produced by Lucky Seven Film Production premiered in Myanmar on November 21, 2019.

== Cast ==
- Myint Myat as Thiha
- Wutt Hmone Shwe Yi as Wutyi
- Khin Hlaing as Thomas
- Zin Wine as Father of Wutyi
- Win Myaing as Uncle of Wutyi
- Nay Naw as Thein Lay
- Sarah Song Oo as Mee Mee
- Helan Susan as Kyi Pyar
- Kyaw Zin Htut as Pyae Sone
