= A Chit Sone Crush? =

2019 Burmese film

- Film Poster
- Burmese: အချစ်ဆုံးCrush?
- Directed by: Aung Zaw Lin
- Screenplay by: Nay Naw
- Starring: Myint Myat; Thinzar Wint Kyaw; Ei Chaw Po; May Myint Mo
- Production company: New Phoe Wa Film Production
- Release date: August 29, 2019
- Running time: 120 minutes
- Country: Myanmar
- Language: Burmese

A Chit Sone Crush? (Burmese: အချစ်ဆုံးCrush?) is a 2019 Burmese romance film starring Myint Myat, Thinzar Wint Kyaw, Ei Chaw Po and May Myint Mo. The film, produced by New Phoe Wa Film Production premiered in Myanmar on August 29, 2019.

== Cast ==
- Myint Myat as Kaung Kin
- Thinzar Wint Kyaw as Jasmine
- Ei Chaw Po as Ngwe La Yaung
- May Myint Mo as Ngwe Hnin Hmone
