= Taw Kyi Kan =

2017 Burmese film

Khoe Soe Lu Hnite 2: Taw Kyi Kan
- Film Poster
- Burmese: ခိုးဆိုးလုနှိုက်၂ တောကျီးကန်း
- Directed by: Steel (Dwe Myittar)
- Screenplay by: Nay Soe Thaw
- Story by: Zan Thakhin Thway
- Produced by: Daw Nu Nu Sein
- Starring: Myint Myat; Khin Hlaing; Htoo Char; Moe Hay Ko
- Production company: Moe Film Production
- Release date: December 22, 2017
- Running time: 120 minutes
- Country: Myanmar
- Language: Burmese

Khoe Soe Lu Hnite 2: Taw Kyi Kan (Burmese: ခိုးဆိုးလုနှိုက်၂ တောကျီးကန်း) is a 2017 Burmese action-drama film, directed by Steel (Dwe Myittar) starring Myint Myat, Khin Hlaing, Htoo Char and Moe Hay Ko. It is the second movie of Khoe Soe Lu Hnite film series. The film, produced by Moe Film Production premiered in Myanmar on December 22, 2017.

== Cast ==
- Myint Myat as Taw Kyi Kan
- Khin Hlaing as Tauk Tae
- Htoo Char as Yin Shan
- Moe Hay Ko as Dee Dee Poe
