= Khoe Soe Lu Hnite =

2016 Burmese film

- Film Poster
- Burmese: ခိုးဆိုးလုနှိုက်
- Directed by: Steel (Dwe Myittar)
- Screenplay by: Nay Soe Thaw
- Story by: Zan Thakhin Thway
- Produced by: Daw Nu Nu Sein
- Starring: Myint Myat; Khin Hlaing; Htun Htun; Nay Dway; Thinzar Wint Kyaw
- Cinematography: Manohar
- Production company: Moe Film Production
- Release date: July 15, 2016
- Running time: 120 minutes
- Country: Myanmar
- Language: Burmese

Khoe Soe Lu Hnite (Burmese: ခိုးဆိုးလုနှိုက်) is a 2016 Burmese action-drama film, directed by Steel (Dwe Myittar) starring Myint Myat, Khin Hlaing, Htun Htun, Nay Dway and Thinzar Wint Kyaw. The film, produced by Moe Film Production premiered in Myanmar on July 15, 2016.

== Cast ==
- Myint Myat as Aung One
- Khin Hlaing as Ni Toot
- Htun Htun as San Pyar
- Nay Dway as Jeep Too
- Thinzar Wint Kyaw as Hnin Si Ni

== See also ==
- Taw Kyi Kan
