= White Castle (film) =

2013 Burmese film

- film poster
- Burmese: အဖြူရောင်ရဲတိုက်
- Directed by: Ko Zaw (Ar Yone Oo)
- Screenplay by: Nay Soe Thaw
- Based on: Secret of A White River by Lun Htar Htar
- Starring: Nay Toe; Pyay Ti Oo; Eaindra Kyaw Zin
- Cinematography: Kyauk Phyu (Padaythar)
- Edited by: Zaw Min (Hanthar Myay)
- Music by: Khin Maung Gyi
- Production company: Shwe Taung Film Production
- Release date: November 8, 2013
- Running time: 120 minutes
- Country: Myanmar
- Language: Burmese

White Castle (Burmese: အဖြူရောင်ရဲတိုက်) is a 2013 Burmese drama film, directed by Ko Zaw (Ar Yone Oo) starring Nay Toe, Pyay Ti Oo and Eaindra Kyaw Zin. The film, produced by Shwe Taung Production premiered Myanmar on November 8, 2013.

== Plot ==
A Visitor Than Lwin(Nay Toe) accidentally met Bagan tourist guide woman named Phyu Phyu (Eaindra Kyaw Zin) while bumping into each other break her camera but he'll promised to get her new one later but two became close friends as days past Than Lwin seem to fallen in love with Phyu Phyu. Time has come Than Lwin need to return home for his work in Foreign countries, during night time He told his love to wait for him as she sob she didn't how long to wait for him. While Than Lwin already left for his new job in other country she decided to leave Old Bagan to find him if he was still there but as soon she invited to Than Lwin's house she decided to think if it's okay to tell his mother that she was his girlfriend that would left mother Daw Tin(Cho Pyone) uncomfortable so tried to introduce herself to apply for job in the house so mother agreed to hire based on her identity. While doing chores she met Ye Yint(Pyay Ti Oo) one of Than Lwin's close friend, he convinced Than Lwin's mother to wanted to proposed her to saved her working life. So she tried to tell her about Ye Yint request made strong decision whether to wait for Than Lwin or start a new life with Ye Yint. After 10 years Than Lwin finally arrived home and make a suddenly surprise but confused to see his fiance as his best friend's wife. Now Ye Yint and Phyu Phyu are couple with 2 kids with one daughter and son. Mother said son look exactly like her son as if they are real biological father and son. Than Lwin now realized that the son named Thit Taw is his biological son with Phyu Phyu now things are getting messy between the family. Than Lwin tried to start a conversation with Phyu Phyu about misunderstood and what happened after he left. While they were settled he left a threatening word around her to ask if Thit Taw is his biological son, the question had big effect on Phyu Phyu's mind. After ended he gave a ride to her home then suddenly her husband saw those coming as if these two are suspicious.

== Cast ==
=== Main ===
- Nay Toe as Than Lwin
- Pyay Ti Oo as Ye Yint
- Eaindra Kyaw Zin as Phyu Phyu

=== Supporting ===
- Cho Pyone as Daw Tin, Than Lwin's mother
- Kaung Pyae as Thit Taw
- Yoon Yoon as Ye Yint's daughter
- Htun Wira as Young Thit Taw, childhood life of Thit Taw
- Htet Htet as childhood life of daughter
- Thandar Bo as Juli
- Khin Hlaing as Mg Htoo
