= Luu Yadanar Treasure =

- Film poster
- Burmese: လူးရတနာသိုက်
- Directed by: Ko Zaw (Ar Yone Oo)
- Screenplay by: Nay Soe Thaw
- Starring: Kyaw Ye Aung; Nay Min; Kaung Pyae; Thar Nyi; Soe Myat Thuzar; Thet Mon Myint; Saung Eaindray Htun; Phu Phu; Aung Khaing; Phuu Pwint Thazin; Ko Pauk
- Music by: Diramore
- Release date: 18 March 2016
- Running time: 120 minutes
- Country: Myanmar
- Language: Burmese

Luu Yadanar Treasure also Luu Yadannar Thike (Burmese: လူးရတနာသိုက်) is a 2016 history and Love film directed by Ko Zaw (Ar Yone Oo) and starring Kyaw Ye Aung, Nay Min, Kaung Pyae, Thar Nyi, Aung Khaing, Ko Pauk and actress Soe Myat Thuzar, Thet Mon Myint, Saung Eaindray Htun, Phu Phu, Phuu Pwint Thazin;in main roles. It is about the Luu ethnic group. It is one of the films that reached the highest-grossing film in Myanmar. The film had theatrical release in Myanmar on March 18, 2016.

This film was achieved Best Cinematography and Best Music-D’ramo Awards at Myanmar Motion Picture Academy Awards.

== Cast ==
- Kyaw Ye Aung
- Nay Min
- Kaung Pyae
- Thar Nyi
- Soe Myat Thuzar
- Thet Mon Myint
- Saung Eaindray Htun
- Phu Phu
- Aung Khaing
- Phuu Pwint Thazin
- Ko Pauk
