= A Ywal Thone Parr Chit Tat Thee =

2017 Burmese film

- Film Poster
- Burmese: အရွယ်သုံးပါးချစ်တတ်သည်
- Directed by: Maung Myo Min
- Screenplay by: Htoo Nwe Eain
- Story by: Htoo Nwe Eain
- Produced by: Ma Aye Aye Win
- Starring: Yan Aung; Kyaw Ye Aung; Pyay Ti Oo; Moht Moht Myint Aung; Khine Thin Kyi; Wutt Hmone Shwe Yi; May Thinzar Oo; Kyaw Kyaw
- Production company: Lucky Seven Film Production
- Release date: May 5, 2017
- Running time: 120 minutes
- Country: Myanmar
- Language: Burmese

A Ywal Thone Parr Chit Tat Thee (Burmese: အရွယ်သုံးပါးချစ်တတ်သည်) is a 2017 Burmese drama film, directed Maung Myo Min starring Yan Aung, Kyaw Ye Aung, Pyay Ti Oo, Moht Moht Myint Aung, Khine Thin Kyi, Wutt Hmone Shwe Yi, May Thinzar Oo and Kyaw Kyaw. The film, produced by Lucky Seven Film Production premiered Myanmar on May 5, 2017.

== Cast ==
- Pyay Ti Oo as Thiha
- Wutt Hmone Shwe Yi as Sandakuu
- Yan Aung as U Nay Min Zaw
- Moht Moht Myint Aung as Daw Moe Myat Thu
- Kyaw Ye Aung as Chit Oo Maung
- Khine Thin Kyi as Khin Madi
- May Thinzar Oo as Daw Khin Khin Chit
- Kyaw Kyaw as Kyaw Kyaw
