= Mar Kyi Shay =

2014 Burmese Film

- Film Poster
- Burmese: မာကြီးရှည်
- Directed by: Mike Tee
- Screenplay by: Gauk Kyi
- Produced by: Ma Aye Aye Win
- Starring: Moe Aung Yin; Ye Aung; Soe Myat Thuzar; Wutt Hmone Shwe Yi
- Cinematography: Maung Myint
- Edited by: Zay Naung; Aung Ko
- Music by: Win Ko
- Production company: Lucky Seven Film Production
- Release date: February 14, 2014
- Running time: 139 minutes
- Country: Myanmar
- Language: Burmese

Mar Kyi Shay (Burmese: မာကြီးရှည်) is a 2014 Burmese comedy film, directed by Mike Tee starring Moe Aung Yin, Ye Aung, Soe Myat Thuzar and Wutt Hmone Shwe Yi.

== Cast ==
- Moe Aung Yin as Aung Aung
- Ye Aung as U Pe Khin
- Soe Myat Thuzar as Daw Mya Nwe
- Wutt Hmone Shwe Yi as Nan
- Gandawin as Khin Hnaung Pyae
- Khay Mi Mi Ko as Nat Mi Mal
- Stella as Stella
- Mos as U Kyar Yoe
- Kin Kaung as Maung Nge
- Kyaw Htoo as Maung Gyi
