= Toe Kyaw Man Nae Nan San Tae Ywar =

2018 Burmese film

- film poster
- Burmese: တိုးကျော်မန်းနဲ့နန်းဆန်တဲ့ရွာ
- Directed by: Kyaw Thar Gyi
- Screenplay by: Moe Ni Lwin
- Story by: Ngwe Ti Oo
- Produced by: Win Htut Win; Hay Nwe Oo
- Starring: Kyaw Ye Aung; Pyay Ti Oo; Bay Lu Wa; Aye Myat Thu; Thinzar Wint Kyaw
- Production company: Celebrity Film Production
- Release date: July 6, 2018
- Running time: 120 minutes
- Country: Myanmar
- Language: Burmese

Toe Kyaw Man Nae Nan San Tae Ywar (Burmese: တိုးကျော်မန်းနဲ့နန်းဆန်တဲ့ရွာ) is a 2018 Burmese comedy film, directed by Kyaw Thar Gyi starring Kyaw Ye Aung, Pyay Ti Oo, Bay Lu Wa, Aye Myat Thu and Thinzar Wint Kyaw. The film, produced by Celebrity Film Production, premiered Myanmar on July 6, 2018.

== Cast ==
- Pyay Ti Oo as Pyay Toe
- Kyaw Ye Aung as Kyaw Yan Aung
- Bay Lu Wa as Lu Man
- Aye Myat Thu as Thakhin Ma
- Thinzar Wint Kyaw as Phyu Phway
- May Sue Maung
- Moe Pwint Phyu
