= Jone Jone Jat Jat =

2017 Burmese film

- Film poster
- Burmese: ဂျုံးဂျုံးဂျက်ဂျက်
- Directed by: Ko Zaw (Ar Yone Oo)
- Produced by: Mu Paing Hnin Si
- Starring: Sai Sai Kham Leng; Wutt Hmone Shwe Yi; Soe Myat Thuzar; Nay Dway
- Production company: Saung Nya Pyar Tho Film Production
- Release date: April 7, 2017 (Myanmar)
- Running time: 122 minutes
- Country: Myanmar
- Language: Burmese

Jone Jone Jat Jat (Burmese: ဂျုံးဂျုံးဂျက်ဂျက်) is a 2017 Burmese romantic comedy-horror film, directed by Ko Zaw (Ar Yone Oo) starring Sai Sai Kham Leng, Wutt Hmone Shwe Yi, Soe Myat Thuzar and Nay Dway. The film, produced by Shwe Si Taw Film Production premiered in Myanmar on April 7, 2017.

== Cast ==
- Sai Sai Kham Leng as Lu Sein Thit
- Wutt Hmone Shwe Yi as Ngwe Yatu
- Soe Myat Thuzar as Ghost Leader, Daw Thuzar
- Nay Dway as Shine Aye Ko
