= A Htar A Thit Nae Hna Khar Chit Mal =

2012 Burmese Film

- Film Poster
- Burmese: အထာအသစ်နဲ့နှစ်ခါချစ်မယ်
- Directed by: Nyi Nyi Htun Lwin
- Screenplay by: Lwin Min Eant
- Story by: Lwin Min Eant
- Produced by: U Myint Swe
- Starring: Yan Aung; Min Maw Kun; Nay Toe; Soe Myat Thuzar; Kyi Lae Lae Oo; Chit Thu Wai; Wutt Hmone Shwe Yi
- Cinematography: Tint San
- Edited by: Kyaw Khine Soe
- Music by: Khin Maung Gyi
- Production company: Lu Swan Kaung Film Production
- Release date: December 21, 2012
- Running time: 116 minutes
- Country: Myanmar
- Language: Burmese

A Htar A Thit Nae Hna Khar Chit Mal (Burmese: အထာအသစ်နဲ့နှစ်ခါချစ်မယ်) is a 2012 Burmese romantic-comedy film, directed by Nyi Nyi Htun Lwin starring Yan Aung, Min Maw Kun, Nay Toe, Soe Myat Thuzar, Kyi Lae Lae Oo, Chit Thu Wai and Wutt Hmone Shwe Yi.

== Cast ==
- Yan Aung as U Hla Shein
- Min Maw Kun as Htet Phone Shein
- Nay Toe as Kyi Thar Oo
- Soe Myat Thuzar as Daw Kyi Phyu
- Kyi Lae Lae Oo as Daw Mu Yar Pwint
- Chit Thu Wai as Moe Thazin
- Wutt Hmone Shwe Yi as Mya Thway Khett
