= Bago Sarr Hnint Thu Ei Virus Myarr =

2016 Burmese film

- Film poster
- Burmese: ပဲခူးဆားနှင့်သူ၏ဗိုင်းရပ်စ်များ
- Directed by: Kyaw Zaw Lin
- Screenplay by: Ko Kyaw
- Story by: Gaw Sein
- Produced by: Thein Shwe
- Starring: Pyay Ti Oo; Kyaw Ye Aung; Yan Aung; Yaza Ne Win; Soe Myat Thuzar; Patricia
- Production company: Aung Thiri Film Production
- Release date: December 16, 2016
- Running time: 120 minutes
- Country: Myanmar
- Language: Burmese

Bago Sarr Hnint Thu Ei Virus Myarr (Burmese: ပဲခူးဆားနှင့်သူ၏ဗိုင်းရပ်စ်များ) is a 2016 Burmese comedy film, directed by Kyaw Zaw Lin starring Pyay Ti Oo, Kyaw Ye Aung, Yan Aung, Yaza Ne Win, Soe Myat Thuzar and Patricia. The film, produced by Aung Thiri Film Production premiered Myanmar on December 16, 2016.

== Cast ==
- Pyay Ti Oo as Htun Thit Oo
- Kyaw Ye Aung as Aww Gyi
- Patricia as Su Hla Naing
- Yan Aung as Mal Kin
- Yaza Ne Win as Thatoe Yazar
- Soe Myat Thuzar as Ko Myat
- Yoon Shwe Yi as Win Win Shwe
