= Lu Gyi Min Khin Byar =

2015 Burmese film

- film poster
- Burmese: လူကြီးမင်းခင်ဗျာ
- Directed by: Nyi Nyi Htun Lwin
- Screenplay by: Lwin Min Eant
- Story by: Lwin Min Eant
- Produced by: U Myint Swe
- Starring: Pyay Ti Oo; Wutt Hmone Shwe Yi; Zin Wine
- Cinematography: Zaw Myint
- Edited by: Kyaw Khaing Soe
- Music by: Zaw Myo Htut
- Production company: Lu Swan Kaung Film Production
- Release date: March 20, 2015
- Running time: 120 minutes
- Country: Myanmar
- Language: Burmese

Lu Gyi Min Khin Byar (Burmese: လူကြီးမင်းခင်ဗျာ) is a 2015 Burmese drama film, directed by Nyi Nyi Htun Lwin starring Pyay Ti Oo, Wutt Hmone Shwe Yi and Zin Wine. The film, produced by Lu Swan Kaung Film Production premiered Myanmar on March 20, 2015.

== Cast ==
- Pyay Ti Oo as Pyae Sone
- Wutt Hmone Shwe Yi as Thiri
- Zin Wine as U Myat Min
- Nyi Htut Khaung as Zarni
- Chan Mi Mi Ko as Su Mon
- Aung Lwin as A Ba Aung
- Zaw Oo as A Ba Nyan
- Tain Nyunt as A Ba Kan
- Maung Maung Myint as A Ba Ba Shin
- San San Win as A Phwar Nu
- Khin Lay Swe as A Phwar Mya Khin
