= Oak Kyar Myet Pauk =

2016 Burmese film

- Film Poster
- Burmese: အုတ်ကြားမြက်ပေါက်
- Directed by: Nyunt Myanmar Nyi Nyi Aung
- Screenplay by: Seven Day
- Story by: Maung Shwe Soon
- Starring: Nay Toe; Htun Htun; Nay Min; Soe Myat Thuzar; Thet Mon Myint
- Production company: Shwe Sin Oo Film Production
- Release date: May 6, 2016
- Running time: 120 minutes
- Country: Myanmar
- Language: Burmese

Oak Kyar Myet Pauk (Burmese: အုတ်ကြားမြက်ပေါက်) is a 2016 Burmese drama film, directed by Nyunt Myanmar Nyi Nyi Aung starring Nay Toe, Htun Htun, Nay Min, Soe Myat Thuzar and Thet Mon Myint. The film, produced by Shwe Sin Oo Film Production premiered in Myanmar on May 6, 2016.

== Cast ==
- Nay Toe as Shwe Oak
- Htun Htun as Phoe Tha Kyar
- Nay Min as Myet Yaing
- Thet Mon Myint as Pauk Pauk
- Soe Myat Thuzar as Ma Ma Gyi
- Zin Wine as U Sein Oak
- Sandi Myint Lwin as Young Ma Ma Gyi

== Awards ==
Year	Award	Category	Nominee	Result
2016	Myanmar Motion Picture Academy Awards	Best Picture	Shwe Sin Oo Film Production	Won
2016	Myanmar Motion Picture Academy Awards	Best Director	Nyunt Myanmar Nyi Nyi Aung	Won
2016	Myanmar Motion Picture Academy Awards	Best Actor	Tun Tun (Examplez)	Won
