= Myint Myat =

Burmese actor

- မြင့်မြတ်
- Born: August 7, 1986 (age 40); Rangoon, Burma
- Occupation: Actor
- Years active: 2006–present
- Notable work: Moe Sway in Yazawin Yine Thu Myar; Nga Htoo in Original Gangster 2: Black Area
- Spouse: Khin Thu Aung (m. 2017)
- Awards: Myanmar Motion Picture Academy Awards (Best Supporting Actor for 2017, Best Actor for 2019 and 2025)

Myint Myat (Burmese: မြင့်မြတ်; born Myo Min Hein on 7 August 1986) is a Myanmar Motion Picture Academy Awards-winning Burmese actor. He began his career in June 2006.

== Selected filmography ==
=== Film (Cinema) ===
List of films
Year	Film	Director	Co-stars
2009	Kyauk Sat Yay	Wyne	Khin Than Nu, May Than Nu, Htun Eaindra Bo, Soe Myat Thuzar, Melody, Thazin, Moe Pyae Pyae Maung, Nan Su Yati Soe, Sandy Myint Lwin
2009	A Myi Ma Phaw Lo Thu Achit		Yan Aung, Kyaw Ye Aung, A Yine, Htun Htun, Ye Lay, Min Thissar, Soe Myat Thuzar, May Thinzar Oo, Khine Thin Kyi, Soe Myat Nandar, Thet Mon Myint, Moe Pyae Pyae Maung
2014	Ko Tint Toh Super Yat Kwat	Kyaw Zaw Lin	Multiple casts
2015	Chit San Eain 2028	Hein Soe	Lu Min, Min Maw Kun, Pyay Ti Oo, Nay Toe, Htun Htun, Nay Min, Htun Eaindra Bo, Eaindra Kyaw Zin, Moe Hay Ko, Chit Thu Wai, Thinzar Wint Kyaw, Soe Pyae Thazin, Wutt Hmone Shwe Yi
2016	Khoe Soe Lu Hnike	Steel	Htun Htun, Nay Dwe, Khin Hlaing, Thinzar Wint Kyaw
2016	You are Bokay Me also Bokay	Pyi Hein Thiha	Kyaw Kyaw Bo, Thinzar Wint Kyaw
2016	Hmaw Kyauk Sar	Win Tun Tun	Thu Htoo San, Htun Htun, Phyo Ngwe Soe, Shwe Hmone Yati, May Myint Mo
2016	Anubis	Lu Min	Lu Min, Nay Toe, Wutt Hmone Shwe Yi, Shwe Hmone Yati (Guest)
2017	Taw Kyee Kan	Steel	Khin Hlaing, Moe Hay Ko
2017	Honeymoon	Ko Zaw (Dawn)	Kyaw Ye Aung, Kyaw Kyaw Bo, Ei Chaw Po, Shwe Hmone Yati
2017	Zut Kyar	Ko Zaw (Dawn)	Kyaw Ye Aung, Moe Aung Yin, Ye Lay, Htet Aung Shine, Khine Thin Kyi, Soe Myat Thuzar, Patricia, Thandar Bo, May
2017	Kyee Kyee Kyal Kyal	Pyi Hein Thiha	Hein Wai Yan, Ei Chaw Po, Shwe Hmone Yati
2017	A Yuu Daw Mingalar	Nyo Min Lwin	Yan Aung, Nan Su Oo
2017	Kyun	Nyunt Myanmar Nyi Nyi Aung	Nay Toe, Soe Myat Thuzar, Wutt Hmone Shwe Yi, Htoo Mon
2017	Mar Yar Style	Nyunt Myanmar Nyi Nyi Aung	Ye Aung, Yar Zar Nay Win, Zay Ye Htet, Nyi Htut Khaung, Shwe Hmone Yati
2017	Original Gangster 2	Joe	Yone Lay, Yu Thandar Tin
2017	Phone Ka Nyar Hna par	Ko Zaw (Dawn)	Phway Phway, Khin Zarchi Kyaw
2017	Yarzawin Yine Thu Myar	Maung Myo Min	Pyay Ti Oo, Laila Khan, Patricia
2017	A Myi Pauk Nae Kyuu	Zaw Myo	Ei Chaw Po, May Kabyar
2018	Buzwar Hotel	Pyi Hein Thiha	Shwe Thamee, Khin Hlaing
2018	Taw Taw Phyit Nay Lar	Kyaw Thar Gyi	Kyaw Ye Aung, Nyi Htut Khaung, Shwe Thamee, Khay Sett Thwin
2018	Happy with Ghosts	R.Perakas	Ei Chaw Po, Patricia
2018	Phoe Shake	Nay Paing	Thinzar Nwe Win
2018	Sai Kyaik Tae Maung	Ko Pauk	Khant Si Thu, Thet Mon Myint
2018	Nga Duuuu	Nyunt Myanmar Nyi Nyi Aung	Min Oo, Shwe Hmone Yati, Nan Su Oo
2018	Maung Missaka Wi Nyin	Nyi Nyi Htun Lwin	Yan Aung, Khant Si Thu, Shwe Hmone Yati, Nan Myat Phyo Thin
2018	Mingalar Bed	Ko Zaw (Dawn)	Kyaw Kyaw Bo, Wutt Hmone Shwe Yi, Khin Zarchi Kyaw
2018	Kyay Kyee Tal	Steel	Nay Myo Aung, Tun Ko Ko, Ei Chaw Po, Khin Zarchi Kyaw, May Myat Noe
2018	Hee Hee Harr Harr	Pyi Hein Thiha	Shwe Hmone Yati
2018	College Bug	Ko Zaw (Dawn)	Wutt Hmone Shwe Yi, Khin Hlaing
2018	Wi Nyin Sane	Win Tun Tun	Kyaw Thu, Yan Aung, Min Maw Kun, Kyaw Kyaw Bo, Nay Myo Aung, Hein Wai Yan, Soe Myat Thuzar
2018	Special 9	Yone Lay	Htoo El Lin, Suzie, Soe Nandar Kyaw
2018	Kyat Guu	Lu Min	Lu Min, Kyaw Htet Aung, Htun Eaindra Bo, Eaindra Kyaw Zin
2018	Knife Nga Pyuu	Kyaw Thar Gyi	Shwe Thamee, Khin Hlaing
2019	Tauk Cha Lite Mal	Khin Hlaing	Khant Si Thu, Shwe Thamee, Patricia
2019	Tha Di! An Da Yal Shi Thi	Yone Lay	Yone Lay, Tyron, Khin Wint Wah
2019	Bar Lar Lar	Ko Zaw (Dawn)	Kyaw Kyaw Bo, Ye Lay, Thet Mon Myint
2019	Joe Yote	Khin Hlaing	Ei Chaw Po, Khin Hlaing
2019	Baw Baw Ka Htaw	Ko Pauk	Yar Zar Nay Win, Khin Hlaing, Shwe Thamee, Hsu Eaint San
2019	Daddy Phar Kim	Nay Paing	Lwin Moe, Ye Aung, Ei Chaw Po
2019	Left Right Left Right	Wyne	Phway Phway
2019	Jin Kaung	Ko Pauk	Soe Myat Thuzar, Khine Thin Kyi, Aye Wutyi Thaung, Ei Chaw Po
2019	Hauk Sar	Pyi Hein Thiha	Kyaw Kyaw Bo, Khin Hlaing, Ei Chaw Po
2019	Kyaw Hmar Galone Yin Hmar Nagar	Nay Paing	Kyaw Thu, Win Pa Eaindra
2019	Charlie Ba	Tee Tant	Ye Aung, Soe Myat Thuzar, Shwe Hmone Yati
2019	Crush	Aung Zaw Lin	Thinzar Wint Kyaw, Ei Chaw Po, May Myint Mo
2019	Yoma Paw Kya Tae Tear	Ko Pauk	Aung Yay Chan, Lin Aung Khit, Kaung Myat San, Htoo Aung, Khin Hlaing, Eaindra Kyaw Zin, Khine Thin Kyi, May Myint Mo
2019	Kha Yay	Wyne	Wutt Hmone Shwe Yi, San Htut
2019	Hero	R.Perakas	Wutt Hmone Shwe Yi
2019	Thitsar Palace	Win Tun Tun	Soe Myat Thuzar, Shwe Hmone Yati, Hsu Myat Noe Oo
2019	Htarwara Htet Hna Sa	Nyunt Myanmar Nyi Nyi Aung	Min Maw Kun, Shwe Hmone Yati
2019	Kyar Kyar Kyaik Kyaik	Pyi Hein Thiha	Min Maw Kun, Makeup Artists
2020	Player	Pyi Hein Thiha	Htun Htun, Tyron, Aye Chan Maung, Soe Myat Thuzar, Ei Chaw Po, May Mi Ko Ko, Hsaung Wutyee May
2020	Original Gangster	Yone Lay	Yone Lay, Yu Thandar Tin
2020	Mite Mae Chit	Zaw Myo	Shwe Hmone Yati, Khin Wint Wah
2020	My Order (Ngar Ei A Maint)	Steel	Htun Htun, , Nay Myo Aung, Moe Hay Ko
2022	Kyaw Gyi Ka Chit Tat Tal	Ko Zaw (Dawn)	Chue Lay, May Mi Ko Ko
2022	Yeesar Yway Nee	Pwint Theingi Zaw	Phway Phway, Htet Aung Shine, Aye Chan Maung
2022	Taw Pauk Myo Pauk	Ko Zaw (Dawn)	Kyaw Kyaw Bo, Nyi Htut Khaung, Khine Thin Kyi, Thun Sett
2023	My husband Kyar Kyar	Ko Zaw (Dawn)	Ei Chaw Po, Pwint Nadi Maung, Khin Hlaing
2023	Let Thel	Ko Zaw (Dawn)	Kyaw Htet, May Myint Mo
2023	Mister Chef Gyi	Ko Zaw (Dawn)	Yoon Yoon, Naw Phaw Eh Htar
2023	Lay Pakka	Ko Zaw (Dawn)	Htet Aung Shine, May Myint Mo, Wai Lar Yi
2023	Hoeeeee Sayar	Ko Zaw (Dawn)	Lwin Moe, Kyaw Ye Aung, Nyi Htut Khaung, Khine Thin Kyi, Patricia
2023	Par Lay Yar Tartee	Pyi Hein Thiha	Ei Chaw Po
2023	Tha Rwee	Pyi Hein Thiha	Nang Khin Zay Yar, Htet Htet Htun, Shwe Eain Si, Maeya Sunsun
2023	Thank you	Pyi Hein Thiha	Nan Su Yati Soe
2023	A Htain Daw	Khin Hlaing	Ei Chaw Po, Shin Mwe La, Lin Lin Thu Thu
2023	Phyat Sa	Own Win	Yan Aung, Soe Myat Thuzar, Khin Zarchi Kyaw, Shwe Hmone Yati
2023	Meaningful Star	Pwint Theingi Zaw	Nan Su Oo, Shwe Pone
2024	Boe Daw King	Ko Zaw (Dawn)	Si Thu Win, Ei Chaw Po, Htet Htet Htun, Chue Lay
2024	Lwe Lwe Lay Bae Kaung Par Tal	Pyi Hein Thiha	Ei Chaw Po, Khin Hlaing
2024	Sein Pauk Pauk	Ko Zaw (Dawn)	Khine Hnin Wai, Htet Htet Htun, Naw Phaw Eh Htar, May Panche, Than Thar Moe Theint
2024	Ka Wai	Ko Zaw (Dawn)	Thet Mon Myint, Chue Lay, Sabel Moe
2024	Jalebi	Ko Zaw (Dawn)	Yan Aung, Eaindra Kyaw Zin, May Thinzar Oo
2024	Htin Paw Kyaw Kyar	Soe Moe Min	Nay Win, Chue Lay, Htet Htet Htun
2024	Boucher	Soe Moe Min	Chue Lay, Chue Sitt Han
2024	Phut Kyar	Pyi Hein Thiha	Ei Chaw Po, Khin Hlaing
2024	A Paing Sar	Pyi Hein Thiha	Kyaw Kyaw Bo, Khine Thin Kyi, Khay Sett Thwin, Poe Kyar Phyu Khin
2024	Taw Ja Pway	Kyaw Thar Gyi	Thinzar Wint Kyaw, Soe Myat Thuzar
2024	Chit Loh Sa Tar Par	Khin Hlaing	Ei Chaw Po, Khin Hlaing
2024	Min Shi Mae Nay Yar	Nyunt Myanmar Nyi Nyi Aung	Ei Chaw Po, Nang Khin Zay Yar
2024	Oxygen	Nay Paing	Moe Aung Yin, Shwe Hmone Yati
2024	Original Gangster 3	Yone Lay	Htun Htun, Yu Thandar Tin, Nang Khin Zay Yar, Khin Wint Wah
2024	Maung's Somia	Win Lwin Htet	Yan Aung, Han Zar Moe Win, Christina, Aish Wararai Kumar, May Mi Ko Ko,Sweet
2024	Milky Rice	Win Tun Tun	Phyo Ngwe Soe, Charlie, Soe Myat Thuzar, Khin Wint Wah. Wai Lar Yi
2025	Zaw Ga Ni	Ko Zaw (Dawn)	May Than Nu, May Myint Mo, Naw Phaw Eh Htar, Sabal Moe
2025	Shal Pyaw	Ko Zaw (Dawn)	Tyron, Soe Myat Thuzar, May Myint Mo
2025	168 Hours	Ko Zaw (Dawn)	Melody, Yadanar Bo, Wai Lar Yi
2025	Playgame	Ko Zaw (Dawn)	Aye Chan Mg, May Myint Mo, Chue Lay
2025	Lay Chun Nat	Ko Zaw (Dawn)	Kyaw Kyaw Bo, Htet Aung Shine, Tayza Lin Yaung, May Myint Mo, Than Thar Nyi, Htun Pearl yadanar
2025	Ahtar Tot Htar	Ko Zaw (Dawn)	Kyaw Ye Aung, Nyi Htut Khaung, Bhone Min Nay La, Chaw Yadanar, Thel Su Nyein
2025	Pwe	Ko Zaw (Dawn)	Kyaw Kyaw Bo, Nyi Htut Khaung, Soe Myat Thuzar, Naw Phaw Eh Htar, Yamone Myint Myat
2025	Super Lady	Ko Zaw (Dawn)	Htoo Aung, Soe Myat Thuzar, Yadanar Bo
2025	Nyi	Ko Zaw (Dawn)	Nay Chi Oo, Htun Pearl yadanar
2025	Pan Myaing Lal Hma U Yin Hmu	Win Lwin Htet	Nat Khet, Soe Pyae Thazin, May Myint Mo
2025	A Tuu	Win Lwin Htet	Yan Aung, Poe Mamhe Thar
2025	Hnin Pwint Say Yar	JZ Down Loon	Thinzar Wint Kyaw, Nyein Thaw, L Bauk Nu
2025	Myar Sar	Nay Paing	Si Thu Win, Aye Myat Thu, Than Thar Nyi, Sinma
2025	Thu Kyauk Ko Kyauk	Nora Ko	Phyo Ngwe Soe, Yamone Myint Myat
2025	Sugar Ko Ko	Nyunt Myanmar Nyi Nyi Aung	Phyo Ngwe Soe, Bobby Soxer, Soe Myat Thuzar
2025	Lupyo Htaung	Pwint Theingi Zaw	Htoo Aung, Melody, Yu Thandar Tin, Naw Phaw Eh Htar (Guest)
2026	Taw Joker	Ko Zaw (Dawn)	Melody, Naw Phaw Eh Htar, May Panche, Sweet
2026	Nat Pan	Ko Zaw (Dawn)	Nay Myo Aung, Khant Kyaw, Soe Myat Thuzar, Naw Phaw Eh Htar
2026	A Nwe Daw	Ko Zaw (Dawn)	Kyaw Kyaw Bo, Shin Mwe La, Chue Lay, Wai Lar Yi
2026	Yauk Kyar Kaung	Ko Zaw (Dawn)	Shwe Htoo, Yadanar Bo, Naw Phaw Eh Htar
2026	Nyo Ki Doh	Win Lwin Htet	Nay Toe, Soe Myat Thuzar, Melody, Khin Wint Wah
2026	Maung Nalizar	Ko Zaw (Dawn)	Khine Thin Kyi, Smile, Aye Wutyi Thaung
2026	Lon	Nay Paing	Ye Aung, Wint Yamone Naing, Than Thar Moe Theint
TBA	Irrawaddy in the heart	Nyunt Myanmar Nyi Nyi Aung	Myat Hmue Khin
TBA	Va Yan Va Tar	Nyunt Myanmar Nyi Nyi Aung	Kyaw Kyaw Bo, Thinzar Wint Kyaw, Su Hlaing Hnin
TBA	Fullmoon Night	Zaw Myint Oo	Moh Moh Myint Aung, Thinzar Wint Kyaw, Ei Chaw Po
TBA	Turn (အလှည့်)	Steel	Nay Min, Moe Hay Ko
TBA	Phway Sein Ma Yae Bodyguard	Steel	Ei Chaw Po, Htar Htet Htet
TBA	Yay Tat Nga Sin Yine	Steel	Thuta Aung, Shwe Thamee
TBA	Khat Kwel (Buffalo)	Steel	Thuta Aung, Soe Myat Thuzar, Aye Myat Thu
TBA	Koh Yo Kar Yar	Pyi Hein Thiha	Shwe Hmone Yati
TBA	Wone Wone Dine Dine	Pyi Hein Thiha	Shwe Hmone Yati
TBA	Lu Yine Island	Pyi Hein Thiha	Yar Zar Nay Win, Yu Thandar Tin, Shwe Thamee
TBA	Bossy 2	Pyi Hein Thiha	Goon Pone, Htet Htet Htun
TBA	Achit Yae Hle Kwat	Aww Ratha	Kyaw Ye Aung, Soe Myat Thuzar, Shwe Hmone Yati
TBA	Kyaw Hein's pupil	Van Gyi	Kaung Khant, Moh Moh Myint Aung, May Thinzar Oo, Khin Zarchi Kyaw
TBA	Palace on the main road	Zaw Myo	Min Oo, Soe Myat Thuzar, Khin Zarchi Kyaw, Patricia, May Panche, Hsu Myat Noe Oo
TBA	Sparkling	Ko Pauk	Soe Myat Thuzar
TBA	Chit Noe Noe	Ko Pauk	Ye Aung, Ei Chaw Po
TBA	Bagan Hmyaw	Ko Pauk	Phway Phway, Aye Wutyi Thaung
TBA	Lu Htel Ka Lu	Ko Pauk	Ye Aung, Soe Myat Thuzar, Patricia
TBA	A Pyo Yaung Night	Ko Pauk	Nyi Htut Khaung, Thuriya, Htun Eaindra Bo, Soe Pyae Thazin, Khin Wint Wah
TBA	Ma Thi Buu Chit Tal	Thein Han (Phoenix)	Ye Aung, Soe Myat Thuzar, Paing Phyo Thu
TBA	Kyie Mite	Ei (Dawn)	Tayza Lin Yaung, Moh Moh Myint Aung, Yadanar Bo
TBA	Lay Thein (400000)	Ei (Dawn)	Khant Si Thu, Kaung Myat San, Wint Yamone Naing, Wai Lar Yi, May Panche, Hsaung Wutyee May
TBA	First Husband	Ko Zaw (Dawn)	Kyaw Ye Aung, Shein Tint Htoo, Soe Myat Thuzar, Yadanar Bo, Thin Thel Bo
TBA	Pin Lal Pyaw	Ko Zaw (Dawn)	Yan Aung, Soe Myat Thuzar, May Myint Mo
TBA	Lay Hnin Yar	Ko Zaw (Dawn)	Kyaw Kyaw Bo, Kaung Myat San, May Kha Lar, Myat Kay Thi Aung, Chue Lay, Thin Thel Bo
TBA	Storm No. 528	Khin Hlaing	Min Oo, Phyo Ngwe Soe, Yair Yint Aung, Chue Lay, M Seng Lu
TBA	Maung Yae May	Win Tun Tun	Shein Tint Htoo, Poe Mamhe Thar
TBA	Center of Left Chest	Nay Paing	Nay Myo Aung, Si Thu Win, Moe Hay Ko
TBA	Pyinnyar Thal	Mike Tea	Lin Zarni Zaw, May Mi Ko Ko, Min Bhone Myat
TBA	Hlwar Hlwat Lwint War	Pyae Phyo Naing	Ye Lwin Oo, Soe Pyae Thazin, Yamone Myint Myat
TBA	Delivery	One Dwin	Nay Myo Aung. Ye Lwin Oo, Soe Pyae Thazin, Hsaung Wutyee May
TBA	Kan Kwyay	Soe Moe Min	Tayza Lin Yaung, May Mi Ko Ko, Yamone Myint Myat
TBA	Khway Myee Kauk Ba Aye	Win Tun Tun	Yan Aung, Kyaw Kyaw Bo, Htoo Char, Ye Lwin Oo, Naw Phaw Eh Htar, Hmue Htate Htar, Su Hlaing Hnin

=== Television series ===
- Pin Lal Gyi Yae A Pyone ( 2022 )
- Kyaw Zaw Maw Zaw ( 2023 )
- Aung Myin Kyaw Kyar Lin Let Tauk Pa ( 2024 )
- A Chit Mhr A Pyit Shi The ( 2025 )

== List of awards and nominations received by Myint Myat ==
Year	Award	Category	Nominated work	Result
2009	Myanmar Motion Picture Academy Awards	Best Actor in a Leading Role	Kyauk Sat Yay	Nominated
2016	Myanmar Motion Picture Academy Awards	Best Actor in a Leading Role	Mhaw Kyauk Sar	Nominated
2017	Myanmar Motion Picture Academy Awards	Best Actor in a Supporting Role	Kyun	Won
2019	Myanmar Motion Picture Academy Awards	Best Actor in a Leading Role	Yoma Paw Kya The Myet Yay	Won
2022	Myanmar Motion Picture Academy Awards	Best Actor in a Leading Role	Yee Sar Yway Nee	Nominated
2024	Myanmar Motion Picture Academy Awards	Best Actor in a Leading Role	Noh Hta Min	Nominated
2025	Myanmar Motion Picture Academy Awards	Best Actor in a Leading Role	Myay Sar	Won

== Personal life ==
He is married to Khin Thu Aung in 2017.
