= A May Kyay Zu Satt Phu Chin Tal =

2010 Burmese Film

- Film Poster
- Burmese: အမေ့ကျေးဇူးဆပ်ဖူးချင်တယ်
- Directed by: Khin Saw Myo (A Phay Pyinnyar)
- Screenplay by: Ma Sandar (MIE MIE)
- Story by: Khin Saing (Kyaung Kabar)
- Starring: Pyay Ti Oo; Thet Mon Myint; Nay Aung; May Than Nu
- Cinematography: Naing Nu Shein
- Music by: Yee Mon
- Production company: Kyaung Kabar Film Production
- Release date: 2010
- Running time: 114 minutes
- Country: Myanmar
- Language: Burmese

A May Kyay Zu Satt Phu Chin Tal (Burmese: အမေ့ကျေးဇူးဆပ်ဖူးချင်တယ်) is a 2010 Burmese drama film, directed by Khin Saw Myo (A Phay Pyinnyar) starring Pyay Ti Oo, Thet Mon Myint, Nay Aung and May Than Nu.

== Cast ==
- Pyay Ti Oo as Ko Ko Zaw, Moe Htet Zaw (dual role)
- Thet Mon Myint as Aye Aye Moe
- Nay Aung as U Thite Htun
- May Than Nu as Daw Khin Khin Swe
- Min Thu as Htun Maung
- Hla Inzali Tint as Rosie
- Aung Khine as Myint Oo
- Wah Wah Aung as mother of Aye Aye Moe
- Ei Si Kway (Child actor) as Moe Htet Zaw

== Award ==
Year	Award	Category	Nominee	Result
2010	Myanmar Motion Picture Academy Awards	Best Supporting Actress	Wah Wah Aung	Won
