= My Country My Home =

2018 Burmese Film

- Film Poster
- Burmese: ဇာတိမြေ
- Directed by: Kyi Phyu Shin
- Screenplay by: Kyi Phyu Shin
- Story by: Koyamachan
- Produced by: Nan Mouk Laung Saing
- Starring: Yan Aung; Aung Ye Lin; Wutt Hmone Shwe Yi; Win Morisaki
- Cinematography: Maung Maung Thar Myint; Ko Nge Lay
- Edited by: Kyi Phyu Shin; No No Aung (Red Radiance)
- Music by: Oakkar Oo Thar
- Production company: Shwe Thanlwin Media Film Production
- Release date: July 27, 2018
- Running time: 128 minutes
- Country: Myanmar
- Language: Burmese

My Country My Home (Burmese: ဇာတိမြေ) is a 2018 Burmese drama film, directed by Kyi Phyu Shin starring Yan Aung, Aung Ye Lin, Wutt Hmone Shwe Yi, Win Morisaki and Noa Kawazoe. The film was produced by Shwe Thanlwin Media Film Production and premiered in Myanmar on July 27, 2018.

== Synopsis ==
Nan was born and raised in Tokyo but her family is from Myanmar. When Nan know that she was stateless and his father is planning to take her home with him, she is shocked but she know from her mother's diary that her father and mother had been involved in the 8888 Uprising about 30 years ago and had immigrated to Japan as a refugee. As told of Burmese-born Japanese singer Aung Kimura, she understood everything and she decided to go to Myanmar, where his relatives live.

== Cast ==
- Yan Aung as U Sai Mai Son
- Aung Ye Lin as Thura
- Wutt Hmone Shwe Yi as Nan Hark Khay
- Win Morisaki as Aung Kimura
- Noa Kawazoe as Miyuki
- Chiharu Ogoshi as Sakura
