= Yazawin Yine Thu Myar =

2017 Burmese Film

- Film Poster
- Burmese: ရာဇဝင်ရိုင်းသူများ
- Directed by: Maung Myo Min
- Screenplay by: Aung Gyi
- Based on: Moe Tasay by Thein Than Htun
- Starring: Pyay Ti Oo; Myint Myat; Patricia; Laila Khan
- Production company: Sein Htay Film Production
- Release date: August 11, 2017
- Running time: 120 minutes
- Country: Myanmar
- Language: Burmese

Yazawin Yine Thu Myar (Burmese: ရာဇဝင်ရိုင်းသူများ) is a 2017 Burmese drama film starring Pyay Ti Oo, Myint Myat, Patricia and Laila Khan. The film, produced by Sein Htay Film Production premiered in Myanmar on August 11, 2017.

== Cast ==
- Pyay Ti Oo as U Myint Mo
- Myint Myat as Moe Sway
- Patricia as Yain Mya Thar
- Laila Khan as Cynthia
