= As U Like =

As U Like (As You Like)
- Theatrical poster
- နင်စေရင်
- Directed by: Wyne (Own Creator)
- Written by: Nay Nawနေနော်
- Produced by: Sein Htay
- Starring: Pyay Ti Oo; Min Oo; Wut Hmone Shwe Yi
- Release date: August 22, 2013
- Running time: 105 minutes
- Country: Myanmar
- Language: Burmese

As U Like or As You Like (Burmese: နင်စေရင်) 'Nin Say Yin' is a 2013 Burmese drama film produced by Sein Htay Film Production. It is one of the films that reached the highest-grossing film in Myanmar.It was based on Nay Naw's novel. It was directed by Wyne (Own Creator). Pyay Ti Oo, Min Oo and Wut Hmone Shwe Yi starred as the main characters.

== Plot ==
A very beloved couple Moe Sway and Wutyi Cho got separated for some reason. Moe Sway loved her so much that he told her 'I would die if it is what you like'. One day, when they meet again when Moe Sway found out that his love Wutyi Cho had changed in so many ways. She even changed her name as Gar Gar. Then Gar Gar realised that they couldn't ever be together with her situation like this and the tragedy story goes on.

== Cast ==
- Pyay Ti Oo as Moe Sway
- Min Oo as Thiha Sithu
- Wutt Hmone Shwe Yi as Wutyi Cho / Gar Gar

== Awards ==
The film won the Best Actor Pyay Ti Oo, Actress Wut Hmone Shwe Yi, and Best Supporting Actor Min Oo of the year 2013 in Myanmar Motion Picture Academy Awards which was held on 27 December 2014.

Script NayNaw နင်စေရင် ဇာတ်ညွှန်းဆု အကယ်ဒမီ စကာတင် nomination စာရင်းဝင်ခဲ့သည်။ ဇာတ်ညွှန်းမှာ စာရေးဆရာနေနော် NayNaw ဖြစ် သည်။
