= Two Weeks Notice (2019 film) =

2019 Burmese drama film

- Film Poster
- Burmese: နှစ်ပတ်အလို
- Screenplay by: Htoo Nwe Eain
- Story by: Maung Myo Min
- Starring: Pyay Ti Oo; Wutt Hmone Shwe Yi; Min Oo; Kyaw Kyaw Bo; Aye Myat Thu
- Production company: Film House Production
- Release date: June 20, 2019 (Myanmar)
- Running time: 120 minutes
- Country: Myanmar
- Language: Burmese

Two Weeks Notice (Burmese: နှစ်ပတ်အလို) is a 2019 Burmese drama film, directed by Maung Myo Min starring Pyay Ti Oo, Wutt Hmone Shwe Yi, Min Oo, Kyaw Kyaw Bo and Aye Myat Thu.The film, produced by Film House Production premiered in Myanmar on June 20, 2019.

== Cast ==
- Pyay Ti Oo as Adipti
- Wutt Hmone Shwe Yi as Mya Kyar Hmone
- Min Oo as Aww Ra Tha
- Kyaw Kyaw Bo as Thiha Latt
- Aye Myat Thu as Yati Chan
- Cho Pyone
- Ye Aung
- Myo Thandar Tun
