= Modern Yazawin =

2014 Burmese Film

- Film poster
- Burmese: မော်ဒန်ရာဇဝင်
- Directed by: Nyi Nyi Tun Lwin
- Starring: Khant Sithu; Wai Lu Kyaw; Pyay Ti Oo; Khin Hlaing; Wutt Hmone Shwe Yi; Htun Eaindra Bo; Sandi Myint Lwin
- Production company: Taw Win Padamyar Film Production
- Release date: July 18, 2014
- Country: Myanmar
- Language: Burmese

Modern Yazawin (Burmese: မော်ဒန်ရာဇဝင် lit: Modern History) is a 2014 Burmese romantic comedy film starring Khant Sithu, Wai Lu Kyaw, Pyay Ti Oo, Khin Hlaing, Wutt Hmone Shwe Yi, Htun Eaindra Bo and Sandi Myint Lwin. The film theatrical released in Myanmar on July 18, 2014.

== Synopsis ==
Nay Kha and Kyaw Kyar arrived unexpectedly to the sixth century AD. Nay Kha fell in love with Htake Htar, daughter of Myo Sar Min. And the love story continued.

== Cast ==
- Khant Sithu as San Sar. Other life name is Myo Sar Min.
- Pyay Ti Oo as Nay Kha
- Khin Hlaing as Kyaw Kyar
- Wai Lu Kyaw as Moe Thee
- Wutt Hmone Shwe Yi as Htake Htar
- Htun Eaindra Bo as Daw Kyar Thit. Other life name is Daw Maydarwi (Takedishin Manawmaya Sayama Gyi).
- Sandi Myint Lwin as Akyin Nar Thit. Other life name is Baydaryi.
