= TT & Donut =

2017 Burmese-Thai film

- film poster
- Burmese: တီတီနှင့်ဒိုးနတ်
- Directed by: Adsajun Sattagovit
- Screenplay by: Adsajun Sattagovit
- Produced by: Piyanuch 'Nucci' Chairatananon; Komkid Kotapong
- Starring: Pyay Ti Oo; Chattarika Sittiprom; Suphawit Muongmee; Shwe Thamee; Chai Khunsriluxsa
- Cinematography: Asana Tanasoponpitak
- Edited by: Marut Seelacharoen
- Production company: Golden Princess Film Production
- Release date: January 6, 2017 (Myanmar)
- Running time: 120 minutes
- Countries: Myanmar; Thailand
- Languages: Burmese; Thai; English

TT & Donut (Burmese: တီတီနှင့်ဒိုးနတ်) is a 2017 Burmese-Thai romantic comedy drama film, directed by Thai director Adsajun Sattagovit starring Burmese actor Pyay Ti Oo and Thai actress Chattarika Sittiprom. The film was shot a joint venture between Myanmar and Thailand; produced by Golden Princess Film production premiered in Myanmar on January 6, 2017.

== Cast ==
- Pyay Ti Oo as TT, Ti Oo
- Chattarika Sittiprom as Donut
- Suphawit Muongmee
- Shwe Thamee
- Chai Khunsriluxsa
