= Original Gangster 2: Black Area =

2017 Burmese film

- Film Poster
- Burmese: အော်ရီဂျင်နယ်ဂန်းစတား၂ အမဲရောင်နယ်မြေ
- Directed by: Joe
- Screenplay by: Min Nyi; Joe
- Story by: Yone Lay
- Starring: Myint Myat; Yone Lay; Zin Wine; Khin Hlaing; Htoo Char; Yu Thandar Tin
- Edited by: Joe; Ah Tint
- Production company: Royal Hero Film Production
- Release date: July 7, 2017
- Running time: 120 minutes
- Country: Myanmar
- Language: Burmese

Original Gangster 2: Black Area (Burmese: အော်ရီဂျင်နယ်ဂန်းစတား၂ အမဲရောင်နယ်မြေ) is a 2017 Burmese action film, directed by Joe starring Myint Myat, Yone Lay, Zin Wine, Khin Hlaing, Htoo Char and Yu Thandar Tin. It is the second movie of Original Gangster film series. Original Gangster 1 was only released as Direct-to-video in 2016. But Original Gangster 2 was released as Big screen film and produced by Royal Hero Film Production premiered in Myanmar on July 7, 2017.

== Cast ==
- Myint Myat as Nga Htoo
- Yone Lay as Nga Ye
- Zin Wine as U Mogok
- Khin Hlaing as Aung Gyi
- Htoo Char as Htoo Char
- Yu Thandar Tin as Kay Thi
