= By Coincidence =

2017 Burmese Film

- Film poster
- Burmese: တိုက်ဆိုင်မှုရှိလျှင်
- Directed by: Maung Myo Min
- Screenplay by: Aung Gyi
- Starring: Pyay Ti Oo; Moe Hay Ko; Laila Khan
- Cinematography: Ko Toe
- Edited by: Lin Lin (Junior)
- Music by: Diramore
- Production company: Sein Htay Film Production
- Release date: August 29, 2014
- Running time: 146 minutes
- Country: Myanmar
- Language: Burmese

By Coincidence (Burmese: တိုက်ဆိုင်မှုရှိလျှင်), is a 2014 Burmese drama film starring Pyay Ti Oo, Moe Hay Ko and Laila Khan. The film, produced by Sein Htay Film Production premiered in Myanmar on August 29, 2014.

== Cast ==
- Pyay Ti Oo as Dr. Thet Paing Soe
- Moe Hay Ko as Amara Thet (his wife)
- Myat Thu Aung as Sithu Soe (his son)
- Laila Khan as Angela
- Ye Aung as Ko Ko Lwin
- May Thinzar Oo as Ma Wai
