= Made in Heart =

2014 Burmese Film

- Burmese: နှလုံးသားဖြင့်ပြုလုပ်သည်
- Directed by: Wyne
- Screenplay by: Thiha Soe
- Based on: Hna Lone Thar Ei A Lel Ba Ho Tae Tae by Lun Htar Htar
- Produced by: Ma Aye Aye Win
- Starring: Pyay Ti Oo; Moe Hay Ko; Wutt Hmone Shwe Yi
- Edited by: Kyaw Khaing Soe
- Music by: Htoo Eain Thin, Ye Lay
- Production company: Lucky Seven Film Production
- Release date: October 3, 2014
- Running time: 120 minutes
- Country: Myanmar
- Language: Burmese

Made in Heart (Burmese: နှလုံးသားဖြင့်ပြုလုပ်သည်), is a 2014 Burmese drama film starring Pyay Ti Oo, Moe Hay Ko and Wutt Hmone Shwe Yi. The film, produced by Lucky Seven Film Production, premiered in Myanmar on October 3, 2014.

== Cast ==
- Zin Wine as U Thitsar
- Moe Hay Ko as Thitsar Ye Ye Ni (his daughter)
- Zin Myo as Moe Di (his son)
- Wutt Hmone Shwe Yi as Mee Mee Ye Ye Ni
- Pyay Ti Oo as Thiha

== Awards ==
| Year | Award | Category | Nominee | Result |
|---|---|---|---|---|
| 2014 | Myanmar Motion Picture Academy Awards | Best Actor | Pyay Ti Oo | Won |
| 2014 | Myanmar Motion Picture Academy Awards | Best Actress | Moe Hay Ko | Nominated |
| 2014 | Myanmar Motion Picture Academy Awards | Best Supporting Actress | Wutt Hmone Shwe Yi | Won |
| 2014 | Myanmar Motion Picture Academy Awards | Best Supporting Actor | Zin Wine | Won |
