= Kiss Like Wine =

2018 Burmese romance film

- Film Poster
- Burmese: အနမ်းဝိုင်
- Directed by: Aung Myat
- Screenplay by: Ponnya Khin
- Based on: Kiss Like Wine by Ponnya Khin
- Starring: Aung Ye Lin; Wutt Hmone Shwe Yi; Soe Myat Thuzar
- Cinematography: Sai Aung Htun
- Edited by: Tin Htun Aung
- Music by: Diramore
- Production company: Sein Htay Film Production
- Release date: February 2, 2018 (Myanmar)
- Running time: 110 minutes
- Country: Myanmar
- Language: Burmese

Kiss Like Wine (Burmese: အနမ်းဝိုင်) is a 2018 Burmese romantic-drama film, directed by Aung Myat starring Aung Ye Lin and Wutt Hmone Shwe Yi. The film, produced by Sein Htay Film Production premiered in Myanmar on February 2, 2018.

== Cast ==
- Aung Ye Lin as Moe Thit Pin
- Wutt Hmone Shwe Yi as La Yake Aye
- Soe Myat Thuzar as Daw Ma Ma Shin
- Min Oo as U Sai Aik
- Kyaw Kyaw as Lin Khine
- Zaw Oo as U Lon
- Wah Wah Aung as Kyi Kyi Nan
