= Yan Thu =

- ရန်သူ
- Directed by: Mee Pwar
- Written by: Lun Htar Htar
- Screenplay by: Moe Ni Lwin
- Produced by: Shwe Sin Oo Motion Picture Production
- Starring: Nay Min; Wutt Hmone Shwe Yi; Nay Chi Oo
- Release date: 14 December 2018
- Country: Myanmar
- Language: Burmese

Yan Thu (Rivals; ရန်သူ) is a 2018 Burmese drama film produced by Shwe Sin Oo Motion Picture Production. The film was based on Lun Htar Htar's novel, directed by Mee Pwar and starring Wutt Hmone Shwe Yi, Nay Chi Oo, and Nay Min as the main characters. The film was premiered in Myanmar cinemas on 14 December 2018.

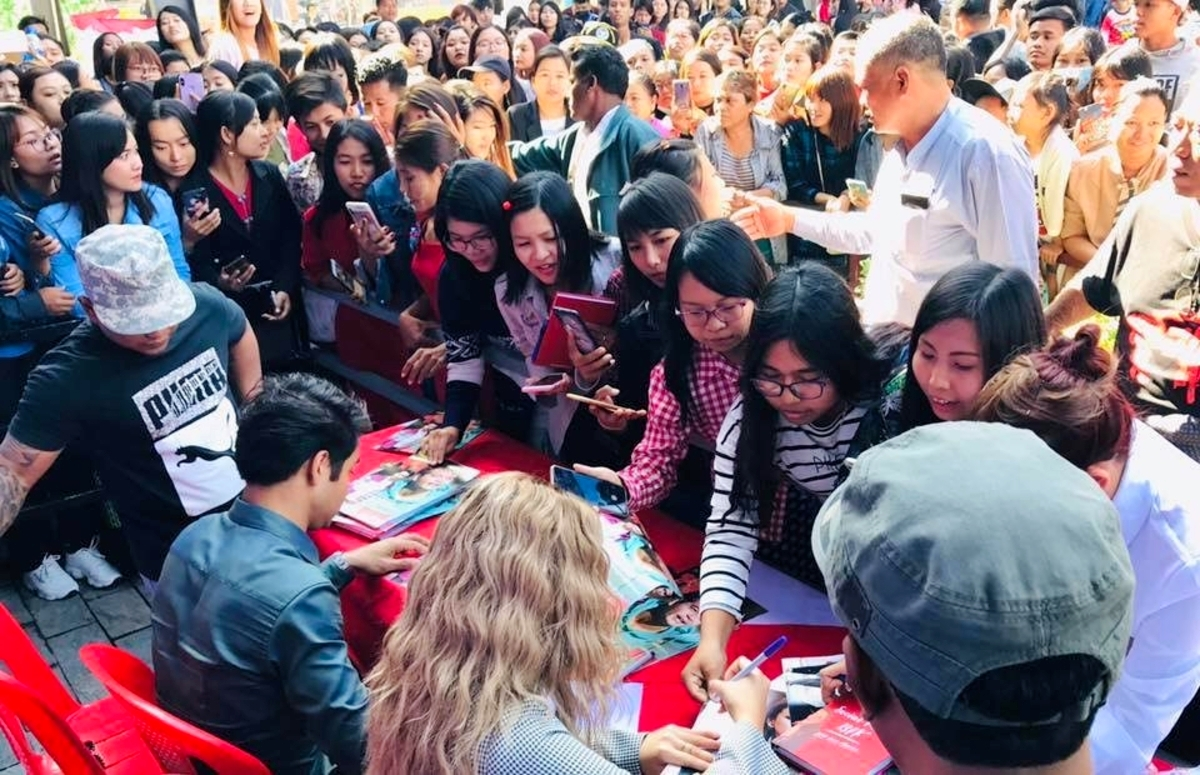
Nay Chi Oo and Nay Min at the signing event of "Yan Thu" movie

The film was a nomination for the 2018 Myanmar Academy Award as Best Actress for Wutt Hmone Shwe Yi.

== Cast ==
- Nay Min - Thet Htin Nyo
- Wutt Hmone Shwe Yi – San Kyal
- Nay Chi Oo – Lay Pyay Nu Thway

== Awards and nominations ==
Year	Award	Category	Nominee	Result
2018	Myanmar Motion Picture Academy Awards	Best Actress Award	Wutt Hmone Shwe Yi	Nominated
