= Kyun (film) =

2017 Burmese film

- Film Poster
- Burmese: ကျွန်
- Directed by: Nyunt Myanmar Nyi Nyi Aung
- Screenplay by: Min Khite Soe San; Htet Myat Naing Zin
- Story by: Kanote May
- Starring: Nay Toe; Wutt Hmone Shwe Yi; Myint Myat; Ye Aung; Soe Myat Thuzar
- Cinematography: Kyaw Kyaw (Moon Shine); Arkar Toe
- Edited by: Aung Myo Oo
- Music by: Diramore
- Production company: Aung Tine Kyaw Film Production
- Release date: May 26, 2017 (Myanmar)
- Running time: 118 minutes
- Country: Myanmar
- Language: Burmese

Kyun (Burmese: ကျွန် Burmese pronunciation: [t͡ɕʊɰ̃]) also known as A Mhaung Tway Ywar Cha Tae Moe Tain (Burmese: အမှောင်တွေရွာချတဲ့မိုးတိမ်) is a 2017 Burmese drama film, directed by Nyunt Myanmar Nyi Nyi Aung starring Nay Toe, Wutt Hmone Shwe Yi and Myint Myat, Ye Aung and Soe Myat Thuzar. It is about the Pagoda slave who was the great slave in Burmese history of Pagan. The film, produced by Aung Tine Kyaw Film Production premiered in Myanmar on May 26, 2017.

== Cast ==
- Nay Toe as Kaung Htet Si Thar
- Myint Myat as Htike Tan Aung
- Wutt Hmone Shwe Yi as Khin Min Kha
- Soe Myat Thuzar as Daw Htake Tin Ma Latt
- Zaw Oo as U Sein Hla Maung
- Thi Yati as Khin Wai
- Hein Min as U Phoe Mya
- Htoo Mon as Daw Hmwe
- Ye Aung as Father of Kaung Htet Si Thar

== Award ==
Year	Award	Category	Nominee	Result
2017	Myanmar Academy Awards	Best Supporting Actor	Myint Myat	Won
2017	Myanmar Academy Awards	Best Supporting Actress	Htoo Mon	Nominated
2017	Myanmar Academy Awards	Best Actress	Wutt Hmone Shwe Yi	Nominated
