= Nat Phat Tae Sone Twal Myar =

2010 Burmese film

- film poster
- Burmese: နတ်ဖက်တဲ့စုံတွဲများ
- Directed by: Ko Zaw (Ar Yone Oo)
- Screenplay by: Ko Shwe Moe Thet
- Based on: Nat Phat Tae Sone Twal Myar by Ponnya Khin
- Starring: Pyay Ti Oo; Eaindra Kyaw Zin; Soe Myat Thuzar; Thet Mon Myint; Nyi Nanda
- Cinematography: Ko Toe; Ye Mon
- Production company: Sein Htay Film Production
- Release date: July 2, 2010
- Running time: 120 minutes
- Country: Myanmar
- Language: Burmese

Nat Phat Tae Sone Twal Myar (Burmese: နတ်ဖက်တဲ့စုံတွဲများ) is a 2010 Burmese comedy-drama film, directed by Ko Zaw (Ar Yone Oo) starring Pyay Ti Oo, Eaindra Kyaw Zin, Soe Myat Thuzar, Thet Mon Myint and Nyi Nanda. The film, produced by Sein Htay Film Production premiered Myanmar on July 2, 2010.

== Cast ==
- Pyay Ti Oo as Lu Kywal
- Eaindra Kyaw Zin as May Thatti
- Soe Myat Thuzar as Daw Mya Sein
- Thet Mon Myint as Sin Yupakar
- Nyi Nanda as Moe Lone Maing
- Ye Aung as U Ba Thet
