= Endless Love (2014 Burmese film) =

2014 Burmese Film

- Film Poster
- Burmese: အဆုံးမဲ့အချစ်
- Directed by: Thein Han (Phoenix)
- Screenplay by: Nay Naw
- Story by: Nay Naw
- Produced by: Myat Thazin
- Starring: Nay Toe; Wai Lu Kyaw; Wutt Hmone Shwe Yi
- Cinematography: Ko Toe Win; Pyi Soe
- Edited by: Kyi Thar
- Music by: Thein Lwin (Dana Moe)
- Production company: Phoenix Film Production
- Release date: August 8, 2014
- Running time: 140 minutes
- Country: Myanmar
- Language: Burmese

Endless Love (Burmese: အဆုံးမဲ့အချစ်) is a 2014 Burmese thriller-drama film, directed by Thein Han (Phoenix) starring Nay Toe, Wai Lu Kyaw and Wutt Hmone Shwe Yi.

== Cast ==
- Nay Toe as Thurikza, Thura Satka (dual role)
- Wai Lu Kyaw as Min Thiha, Thake Di (dual role)
- Sai Thiha as Nanda
- Wutt Hmone Shwe Yi as Twe Tar Oo, Yu Par (dual role)
- Kyu Kyu Thin as Aunty Kyu
- K Nyi as Phoe Lone
- A Ni Zaw as Nan Phyu
