= Moe Hay Ko =

Burmese actress

- မိုးဟေကို
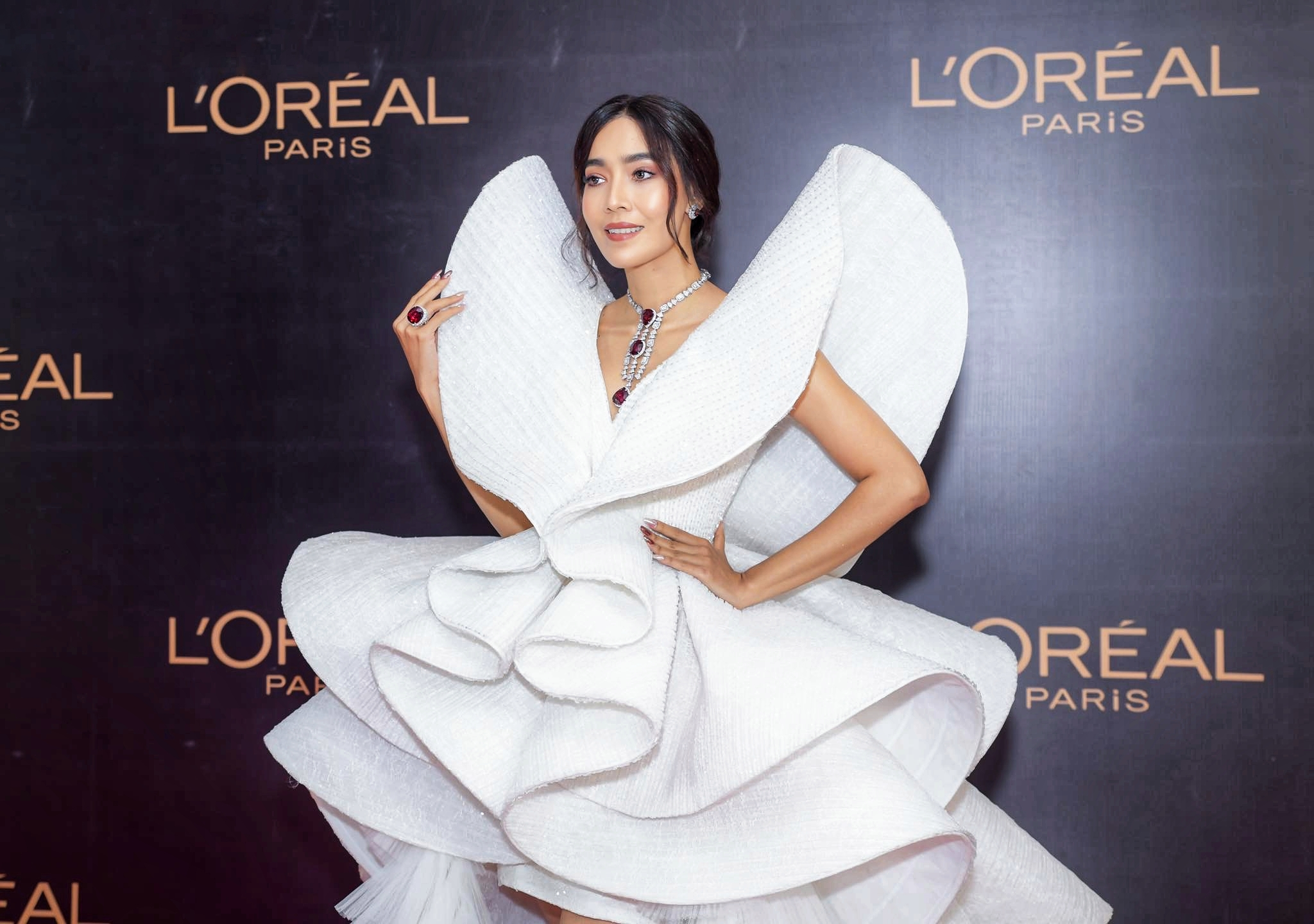
- Moe Hay Ko at an event
- Born: Aye Aye Khine; June 26, 1985 (age 41); Mandalay, Burma
- Occupation: Actress • Model• Producer • Businesswoman
- Years active: 1999–present
- Height: 5 ft 7 in (1.70 m)
- Parent(s): Kyaw Min; Nu Nu Sein
- Awards: Asia Model Award (2015)

Moe Hay Ko (Burmese: မိုးဟေကို; born Aye Aye Khine on 26 June 1985) is a Burmese actress, model, producer and businesswoman. She is the Myanmar's third highest-paid actress and considered one of the most commercially successful actresses in Burmese cinema. Throughout her successful career, she has acted in over 300 films.

Moe has won the Asia Model Award at the 2015 Asia Model Festival, held in Seoul in 2015.

== Early life and education ==
Moe Hay Ko was born on 26 June 1985 in Mandalay, Myanmar. She is the middle daughter of Kyaw Min and his wife Nu Nu Sein. She has an elder brother and younger brother. She graduated high school from Basic Education High School No. 1 South Okkalapa.

== Career ==
=== 1997–2004: Beginning as a commercial model ===
Moe joined Tin Moe Lwin's model training at the grade 9. She officially entered the entertainment industry in 1999 was as a model as part of the John Lwin's John International Modeling Agency with countless modelling competition and runways that had been walked on. Then came the offers for TV commercials and then DVD ones. Her hardwork as a model and acting in commercials was noticed by the film industry and soon, movie casting offers came rolling in.

=== 2005–2006: Film debut and recognition ===
Moe made her film debut with a leading role in the film Eain Mat Alon (Beyond the dream), alongside Lu Min, film released in 2005. The same year, she then starred a female lead in the film Kyun Ma Ma Hay Thi (I'm Mistress) alongside Pyay Ti Oo and Khine Hnin Wai. In 2006, she starred in the film A Hmyin, where she played the leading role with Lu Min, Ye Deight, and Tint Tint Tun. The film was both a domestic hit in Myanmar, and led to increased recognition for Moe Hay Ko.

=== 2008–present: Breaking into the big screen and career success ===
In 2008, Moe took on her first big-screen leading role in the film Moe Nya Eain Mat Mhyu, alongside Nay Toe, Soe Pyae Thazin, Thinzar Wint Kyaw, and directed by Kyi Phyu Shin which screened in Myanmar cinemas in 2009. The film was nominated Best Actress for Moe Hay Ko and have won Best Actor for Nay Toe and Best Supporting Actress for Soe Pyae Thazin at the 2009 Myanmar Academy Award Ceremony.

In 2013, Moe starred in the big-screen film HnaLonThar Phyint Pyuu-Lote Thi (Made with Heart) where she played the leading role with Pyay Ti Oo, Wutt Hmone Shwe Yi and directed by Wyne which screened in Myanmar cinemas in 2014, which earned her a nomination for the 2018 Myanmar Academy Award for Best Actress and have won three Academy Awards at the 2014 Myanmar Academy Award Ceremony. From 2005 to present, she has acted in over 300 video/films.

== Film production and business ==
In 2014, Moe established a film production company called Moe Film Production, whose first film Yone Pati Thee Lay Myar (The Littile Okras). One of the produced films named Koe Soe Lu Hnite which received overwhelming support from the audience. From 2014 to present, the production have produced over 10 film. On 27 March 2015, she opened the Moe Fabric House, a store selling silk, cotton and traditional fabric.

== Book ==
In 2016, Moe had also produced a travel documentary book titled Kya Ma Chit Thaw (My Beloved), a travel diary of sorts that came together with stunning photos of Moe Hay Ko herself and beautiful, local places she'd visited. The book was printed in Thailand with a first run of 2000 copies.

== Filmography ==
=== Films ===
- Over 300 films

=== Films (Cinema) ===
Lists of Films
Year	Film	Director	Co-stars
2009	Moe Nya Einmet Myu	Kyi Phyu Shin	Nay Toe, Soe Pyae Thazin, Thinzar Wint Kyaw
2011	A Lann Zayar	Nyi Nyi Htun Lwin	Thu Htoo San, Moe Aung Yin, Thinzar Wint Kyaw, Nan Su Yati Soe, Melody
2014	Lu Sein (Stranger)	Aung Zaw Lin	Nay Toe, May
2014	Hna-Lone-Thar Phyint Pyu-Lote Thi (Made in Heart)	Wyne	Pyay Ti Oo, Wutt Hmone Shwe Yi
2014	By Coincidence	Maung Myo Min	Pyay Ti Oo, Laila Khan
2015	A Chein Tine Nay Ya Tine	Wyne	Pyay Ti Oo, Htun Eaindra Bo, Aye Myat Thu, Kyaw Kyaw, Phway Phway, Min Oo, Yin Latt
2017	Taw Kyi Kan (Wild Crow)	Steel (Dwe Myit Tar)	Myint Myat, Htoo Char, Khin Hlaing
2018	A Mone Tway Kauk Htar Lite	Thar Nyi	Nay Toe
2019	Pa Pa Wadi See Yin Khan	Wyne	Htun Htun, A Linn Yaung, Phway Phway
2023	Overdue Rain	Nay Hein	Nay Toe , Moe Hay Ko , Aung Min Khant , Chue Lay
2023	Once Upon A Time Yangon	Nyo Min Lwin	Lu Min , Moe Hay Ko , Tyron , Kaung Myat San
2023	Taung Su Ta Khu Pyae Say Thar	Steel	Tun Tun , Tun Ko Ko , May Myint Mo
2024	Ta Khote Ta Ya	Wyne	Kyaw Htet Aung, Htet Htet Htun
2024	Mi Tin Sein	Wyne	A Lin Yaung, Khine Hnin Wai
2026	Ma Yar Pyaing	Wyne	Tyron , May Mi Ko Ko
2026	Shwe Pin Oh	Steel	A Lin Yaung , Htet Htet Moe Oo , Nyi Htut Khaung , Naw Phaw Eh Htar
2026	Me & My Darling	Ko Zaw ( Ar Yone Oo )	Aye Chan Maung , May Than Nu

=== Television series ===
Lists of Series
Year	Series	Director	Co-Stars	Role	Channel	Note
2023	Ah Mone	Wyne	Chan Min Ye Htut, Khin Wint Wah, Min Oo, Nyi Nanda, Khin Zarchi Kyaw, Moe Pwint Phyu, Thonedray Oo	Mya Gamone	Mahar Mobile	
2024	Ah Mone Myit Kan Par	Ko Zaw ( Ar Yone Oo )	Aung Ye Lin , Tyron , Hsaung Wutyee May			
2025	A Chit Mhr A Pyit Shi The	Ko Zaw ( Ar Yone Oo )	Myint Myat , Charlie , Hsaung Wutyee May			

== Awards and nominations ==
Year	Award	Category	Nominated work	Result
2009	Myanmar Academy Award	Best Actress	Moe Nya Eain Mat Mhyu	Nominated
2014	Myanmar Academy Award	Best Actress	Hna-Lon-Thar Phyint Pyu-Lote Thi (Made with Heart)	Nominated
2024	Myanmar Academy Award	Best Actress	Ta Khote Ta Ya	Nominated
