= Nat Win The =

2025 Burmese supernatural horror film

- Film poster
- နတ်ဝင်သည်
- Directed by: Win Lwin Htet
- Written by: Win Lwin Htet
- Screenplay by: Moe Ni Lwin
- Produced by: Thandar Ko Ko
- Starring: A Linn Yaung; Wutt Hmone Shwe Yi
- Cinematography: Thiha Thit
- Edited by: Thandar Ko Ko
- Music by: Kaung Sett Paing(Gita Myo)
- Production company: W Entertainment
- Release date: 31 October 2025
- Country: Myanmar
- Language: Burmese

Nat Win The (Burmese: နတ်ဝင်သည်; lit. Spirit Medium) is a 2025 Burmese satirical supernatural horror drama film directed by Win Lwin Htet and written by Moe Nyi Lwin, based on a story by Win Lwin Htet. The film stars A Linn Yaung and Wutt Hmone Shwe Yi in leading roles. It was released in Myanmar on 31 October 2025.

== Plot ==
In a rural village, an innocent man is falsely accused of murdering a psychologically unstable pregnant woman after blood is found on his long knife. Influenced by the real perpetrator, the village chairman orders the man to be sent across a river despite his protests. During the journey, a fight breaks out on the boat carrying the accused man, his friend, and two of the criminals, causing the boat to capsize and resulting in the deaths of all on board.

Meanwhile, a young woman gifted with the ability to communicate with spirits faces discrimination from her community. Although she helps uncover crimes through her visions and nightmares, she continues to be ostracized. Eventually, she embraces her role as a spirit medium and helps supernatural beings find peace, challenging local prejudices surrounding the supernatural and highlighting themes of critical thinking and women's empowerment.

== Cast ==
- A Linn Yaung as Phoe Tay
- Wutt Hmone Shwe Yi as Lay Ngum
- Nay Htet Lin
- Charlie
- Nyi Nanda
- May Than Nu
- Myo Thandar Tun
- Phu Sone
- Pyae Kaung Su Thant
- San San Win
- Win Min Than
- Htoo Thar
- Hnin
- Luun Chel
- Yoon Shwe Yoke Hlwar
- Nay Bhone Htet Kyaw
- Nan Gaday San Oo
- Shin Min Eain

== Production ==
The film was produced by W Entertainment. Win Lwin Htet served as both the story writer and director, while Moe Nyi Lwin wrote the screenplay.

== Recognition ==
Nat Win The was among the films screened by the Myanmar Motion Picture Academy Awards Selection Committee for consideration for the 2025 Myanmar Motion Picture Academy Awards.

== Awards and nominations ==
Year	Awards	Category	Nominated work	Result
2025	Myanmar Academy Awards	Best Director	Win Lwin Htet	Nominated
2025	Myanmar Academy Awards	Best Screenplay	Moe Ni Lwin	Nominated
2025	Myanmar Academy Awards	Best Music	Kaung Sett Paing(Gita Myo)	Nominated
2025	Myanmar Academy Awards	Best Cinematography	Thiha Thit	Nominated
2025	Myanmar Academy Awards	Best Editing	Thandar Ko Ko	Nominated
2025	Myanmar Academy Awards	Best Sound	Ko Joe	Won
2025	Myanmar Academy Awards	Best Actress	Wutt Hmone Shwe Yi	Nominated
2025	Myanmar Academy Awards	Best Supporting Actress	Myo Thandar Htun	Nominated
