= Myet Nu =

2020 Burmese romantic drama film

- Film poster
- Burmese: မြက်နု
- Directed by: Phwint Theingi Zaw
- Written by: Moe Ni Lwin
- Starring: Nay Toe; Wutt Hmone Shwe Yi
- Music by: Wai Gyi
- Production company: Shwe Myanmar Film Production
- Release date: January 23, 2020
- Running time: 120 minutes
- Country: Myanmar
- Language: Burmese

Myet Nu (Burmese: မြက်နု, lit. 'Fresh grass') is a 2020 Burmese romantic-drama film starring Nay Toe and Wutt Hmone Shwe Yi. The film, produced by Shwe Myanmar Film Production premiered in Myanmar on January 23, 2020.

== Cast ==
- Nay Toe as Thet Paing
- Wutt Hmone Shwe Yi as Jade
- Mone as Dr. Yin Myo Nwe
