= Hna Pin Lain Tae Yee Sar Sar =

2012 Burmese Film

- Film Poster
- Burmese: နှစ်ပင်လိမ်တဲ့ရည်းစားစာ
- Directed by: Nyi Nyi Htun Lwin
- Screenplay by: Myo Ko Myo
- Story by: Myint Than Aung
- Produced by: Dr. Thar Nyan
- Starring: Yan Aung; Ye Aung; Pyay Ti Oo; Kyaw Kyaw Bo; Myint Myint Khine; Soe Myat Thuzar; Khine Hnin Wai; Wutt Hmone Shwe Yi
- Cinematography: Tin San; Kyaw Kyaw
- Edited by: Kyaw Khine Soe
- Music by: Khin Maung Gyi
- Production company: Sein War Ni Film Production
- Release date: August 3, 2012
- Running time: 142 minutes
- Country: Myanmar
- Language: Burmese

Hna Pin Lain Tae Yee Sar Sar (Burmese: နှစ်ပင်လိမ်တဲ့ရည်းစားစာ) is a 2012 Burmese romantic-comedy film, directed by Nyi Nyi Htun Lwin starring Yan Aung, Ye Aung, Pyay Ti Oo, Kyaw Kyaw Bo, Myint Myint Khine, Soe Myat Thuzar, Khine Hnin Wai and Wutt Hmone Shwe Yi.

== Synopsis ==
When Shein's mother got Nadi's love letter for Shein, she suspected her husband. When Nandar's father got Shein's love letter for Nandar, he suspected his wife. In this film, you will see the problems caused by a love letter with comedy.

== Cast ==
- Pyay Ti Oo as Shein
- Wutt Hmone Shwe Yi as Nadi
- Kyaw Kyaw Bo as Soe Htun Khine
- Khine Hnin Wai as Nandar
- Yan Aung as U Aung Myat Shwe
- Myint Myint Khine as Daw Khin La Won
- Soe Myat Thuzar as Daw Yin Yin Mya
- Ye Aung as U Nay Min
- Pwint as Pwint
- Heavy Phyo as Hein
