= La Yaung Phyar Tae Inlay Mhar =

2017 Burmese drama film

- Film poster
- Burmese: လရောင်ဖြာတဲ့အင်းလေးမှာ
- Directed by: Nyunt Myanmar Nyi Nyi Aung
- Screenplay by: Min Khite Soe San; Htet Myat Naing Zin
- Produced by: Wah Wah Win Shwe
- Starring: Nay Toe; Wutt Hmone Shwe Yi; Wah Zin
- Edited by: Aung Myo Oo
- Music by: Diramore
- Production company: Wah Wah Win Shwe Film Production
- Release date: January 5, 2017 (Myanmar)
- Running time: 120 minutes
- Country: Myanmar
- Language: Burmese

La Yaung Phyar Tae Inlay Mhar (Burmese: လရောင်ဖြာတဲ့အင်းလေးမှာ) is a 2017 Burmese thriller-drama film, directed by Nyunt Myanmar Nyi Nyi Aung starring Nay Toe, Wutt Hmone Shwe Yi and Wah Zin.The film, produced by Wah Wah Win Shwe Film Production premiered in Myanmar on January 5, 2017.

== Cast ==
- Nay Toe as Min Naung Yoe
- Wutt Hmone Shwe Yi as Kyar Nyo Thwe
- Wah Zin as Sai Wunna
- Hsu Myat Noe Oo as Nandar
