= Nay Min =

Burmese actor

- နေမင်း
- Born: 6 August 1983 (age 42); Bago, Burma
- Occupation: Actor
- Years active: 2008–present

Nay Min (Burmese: နေမင်း; born 6 August 1983) is a Burmese actor. He is best known for his leading roles in several Burmese films. Throughout his career, he has acted as leading actor in over 200 films.

== Early life and education ==
Nay Min was born on 6 August 1983 in Thet Ka La Village, Bago, Bago Region, Myanmar. He attended at Thet Ka La high school.

== Career ==
Nay Min went to work in Korea from the age of 19 until he started acting career. He intended to go to school in England but ended up in Korea. After returning from Korea, he entered the art world and made a number of films with his Shwe Sin Oo Film Production and others.

== Filmography ==
=== Film (Cinema) ===
- Thwar Lu Soe Dar Myo Taw Tat Tal (2012)
- Chit San Eain 2028 (2015)
- Mingalar Hlae (2015)
- Oak Kyar Myet Pauk (2016)
- Luu Yadanar Treasure (2016)
- Yan Thu (2018)
- Lay Par Kyawt Shein Warazain (2019)
