= Thinzar Wint Kyaw =

Burmese actress and model (born 1987)

- သင်ဇာဝင့်ကျော်
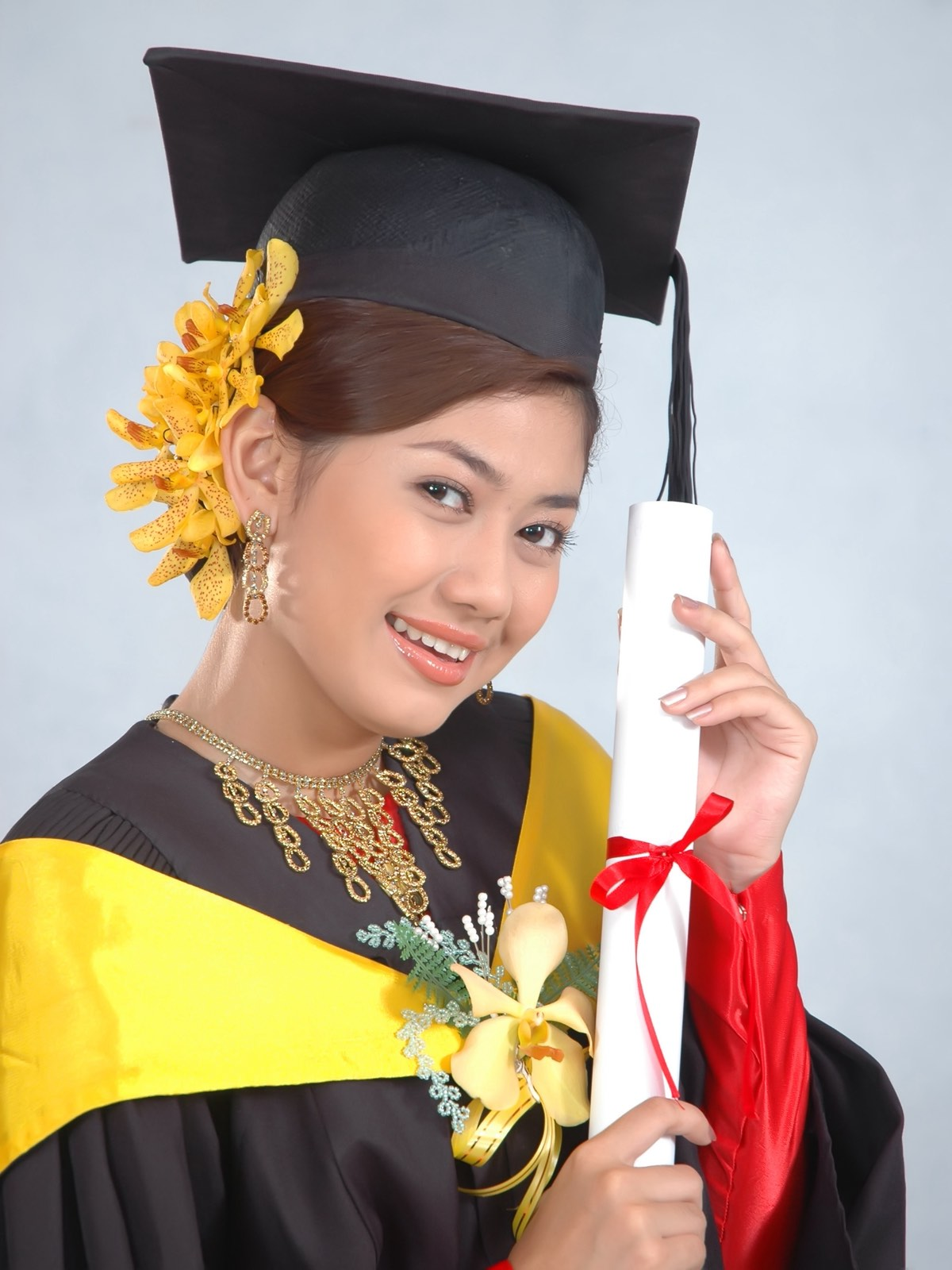
- Thin Zar Wint Kyaw
- Born: Thinzar Wint Kyaw; 4 December 1987 (age 38); Rangoon, Burma
- Education: East Yangon University
- Occupations: Actress; model; singer
- Years active: 2006–present
- Website: www.thinzarwintkyaw.org

Thinzar Wint Kyaw (also spelled Thin Zar Wint Kyaw, Burmese: သင်ဇာဝင့်ကျော်; born 4 December 1986) is a Burmese actress and model. She was featured in The Myanmar Times "Top 10 Actor" list in 2019. Over the course of her successful career, she has appeared in more than 500 Burmese films.

== Early life and education ==
Thinzar Wint Kyaw was born to a Shan Burmese father and an ethnic Mon mother on 4 December 1987 in Yangon, Myanmar. She is the second daughter in her family. She attended the East Yangon University.

== Career ==
She began her career as a commercial model. After she switched her career to film from modelling, she rose to fame in the eyes of many filmography companies thereafter with a lot of acting assigns. Since 2017, she had to play in several films such as Min lal Bo-K Ngar lal Bo-K and A Ywal 3 Par Chit Tat The, ThuNgalChinYoukKhama 2, Thu Ngal and Wit Nhyn Ka Kyoe.

Her notable internationally recognized film was Shwe Kyar directed by Wyne which educational drama film that screened in Myanmar, Singapore and Malaysia cinemas in 2018, both in English and Burmese languages, with that her movie had won several Myanmar Academy Awards in 2019.

== Political activities ==
In the aftermath of the 2021 Myanmar coup d'état, she actively engaged in the anti-coup movement, participating in person at rallies and leveraging her social media presence with 2.8 million followers. Thinzar joined the "We Want Justice" three-finger salute movement, which originated on social media and has garnered support from numerous celebrities.

=== Arrest ===
On 6 July 2022, Thinzar was arrested after her visit to the headquarters of the Shan State Progress Party (SSPP). During the visit, she was reported to have attended a wedding ceremony wearing an SSA military uniform in the presence of Colonel San Suh of the Shan State Progressive Party/Shan State Army. The junta's army was in conflict with the SSPP/SSA in the Momeik area of northern Shan state at that time, and her visit to the SSPP headquarters sparked criticism from pro-military groups.

A statement from SSPP Info mentioned that the Shan State Progressive Party/Shan State Army (SSPP/SSA) had extended an offer to document local development projects encompassing religion, education, health, and transportation. However, pro-military lobby groups led by Han Nyein Oo, suspected to be a military spy, are urging the junta army to permanently halt Thinzar Wint Kyaw's involvement in modeling and entertainment.

On 5 August 2022, the military junta initiated a legal case against Thinzar Wint Kyaw and model Nang Mwe San. The duo is accused of harming Myanmar culture and disseminating sexually explicit photos and videos on social networks. As per an announcement by state-controlled media MRTV, they have been arrested under Section 33(a) of the Electronic Law for earning money by posting sexually revealing photos on websites such as OnlyFans and Extrania.

In December 2022, she was sentenced to 5 years in prison by the military court.

On January 4, 2025, she was released from prison through a pardon to commemorate Independence Day.

== Selected filmography ==
=== Film (Cinema) ===
- Moe Nya Einmet Myu (မိုးညအိပ်မက်မြူ) (2009)
- A Lann Zayar (2011)
- A Lann Lun A Lun Lann (2012)
- A Mike Sar (2013)
- Chit San Eain 2028 (2015)
- Min lal Bo-K Ngar lal Bo-K (2016)
- Khoe Soe Lu Hnite (2016)
- Wit Nyin Ka Kyoe (ဝိညာဉ်ကကြိုး) (2017)
- Shwe Kyar (ရွှေကြာ) (2018)
- Toe Kyaw Man Nae Nan San Tae Ywar (တိုးကျော်မန်းနဲ့နန်းစံရွာ) (2018)
- Ma Tahtaung Ta Kg Bwar (မတစ်ထောင်တကောင်ဖွားး) (2018)
- Tel Gyet (Decoy)(တည်ကြက်) (2018)
- MIDNIGHT (သန်းခေါင်ယံည) (2019)
- A Chit Sone Crush? (အချစ်ဆုံး Crush?) (2019)
- Mya Mya (မြမြ) (2020)
- Than Yaw Zin Min Thar
- Ma Chit That Tu Chin
