= Aye Myat Thu =

Burmese actress

- အေးမြတ်သူ
- Born: 14 September 1986 (age 39); Rangoon, Burma (now Yangon, Myanmar)
- Occupation: Actress
- Awards: Miss People 2006 (Winner); Myanmar Academy Award (Best Supporting Actress for 2018)

Aye Myat Thu (Burmese: အေးမြတ်သူ; born 14 September 1986) is a Myanmar Academy Award winning Burmese actress and model, who has acted in videos, movies and television series throughout her career. She entered the entertainment industry through modeling and beauty pageants after completing her matriculation exam.

== Political activities ==
Following the 2021 Myanmar coup d'état, she participated in the anti-coup movement both in person at rallies and through social media. Denouncing the military coup, she took part in protests, starting in February. She joined the "We Want Justice" three-finger salute movement. The movement was launched on social media, and many celebrities joined the movement.

On 16 April 2021, warrants for her arrest were issued under Section 505 (a) of the Myanmar Penal Code by the State Administration Council for speaking out against the military coup. Along with several other celebrities, she was charged with calling for participation in the Civil Disobedience Movement (CDM) and damaging the state's ability to govern, with supporting the Committee Representing Pyidaungsu Hluttaw, and with generally inciting the people to disturb the peace and stability of the nation.

== Filmography ==
=== Films ===
- Chu Si (ချူဆီ) (2018)
- Toe Kyaw Man Nae Nan San Tae Ywar (တိုးကျော်မန်းနဲ့နန်းစံရွာ) (2018)
- Naung Twin Ou Dan Twin Say Tha Di (နောင်တွင်ဥဒါန်းတွင်စေသတည်း) (2018)
- Two Weeks Notice (2019)

=== Television series ===
- Expedition Myanmar (2017)
- It was on Yesterday (2017)
- It was on Yesterday 2 (2018)

== Awards and nominations ==
| Award | Year | Category | Nominated work | Result |
|---|---|---|---|---|
| Myanmar Academy Award | 2016 | Best Actress | Prof. Dr. Sait Phwar and Myaing Yar Zar Tar Tay | Nominated |
| Myanmar Academy Award | 2017 | Best Actress | Khout Htee Kalay Ma Lont Ta Lon | Nominated |
| Myanmar Academy Award | 2018 | Best Supporting Actress | Naung Twin Oo Dan Twin Say Tha dee | Won |
| Myanmar Academy Award | 2020 | Best Supporting Actress | Kan Ma Pha La | Nominated |
