= Soe Myat Thuzar =

Burmese actress and writer

- စိုးမြတ်သူဇာ
- Born: Soe Myat Thuzar; August 31, 1971 (age 54); Rangoon, Burma; Now Yangon, Myanmar)
- Education: University of Distance Education, Yangon
- Occupations: Actress, writer
- Years active: 1989–present
- Height: 5 ft 6 in (1.68 m)
- Spouse: U Myo Min (m. 2000; div. 2009)
- Parent(s): Major Soe Myint (father); Kyi Kyi Khin (mother)

Soe Myat Thuzar (Burmese: စိုးမြတ်သူဇာ; born 31 August 1971) is a three-times Myanmar Academy awarded Burmese actress and writer. She is best known for acting in many Burmese films.

She started her acting career in September 1989.

== Early life ==
Soe Myat Thuzar was born on 31 August 1971 in Yangon, Myanmar to parents, Major Soe Myint and Kyi Kyi Khin. She is the eldest daughter of four. The two sister Soe Myat Nandar and Soe Myat Kalayar are actress. And the two cousin Soe Pyae Thazin and Sandi Myint Lwin are also actress.

== Filmography ==
=== Film ===
- Naw Yin Mway (နော်ရင်မွေး) (1994)
- Shwe Nant Thar San Eain (ရွှေနံ့သာစံအိမ်) (1998)
- Shock Shi Tae A Chit Myar (ရှော့ရှိတဲ့အချစ်များ) (2008)
- Kyoe Tann (ကြိုးတန်း) (2008)
- 101 Nights with Mother-in-Law (2009)
- Kyauk Sat Yay (ကျောက်စက်ရေ) (2009)
- Nat Phat Tae Sone Twal Myar (နတ်ဖက်တဲ့စုံတွဲများ) (2010)
- Kyauk Thin Pone Tway Moe Htar Tae Eain (ကျောက်သင်ပုန်းတွေမိုးထားတဲ့အိမ်) (2010)
- May Khin Kanyar (မေခင်ကညာ) (2012)
- Let Pan (လက်ပံ) (2012)
- Thwar Lu Soe Dar Myo Taw Tat Tal (သွားလူဆိုးဒါမျိုးတော့တတ်တယ်) (2012)
- Hna Pin Lain Tae Yee Sar Sar (နှစ်ပင်လိမ်တဲ့ရည်းစားစာ) (2012)
- Kyal Sin Maw Kun (ကြယ်စင်မော်ကွန်း) (2013)
- Ko Tint Toh Super Yat Kwat (ကိုတင့်တို့စူပါရပ်ကွက်) (2014)
- Bago Sarr Hnint Thu Ei Virus Myarr (ပဲခူးဆားနှင့်သူ၏ဗိုင်းရပ်စ်များ) (2016)
- Luu Yadanar Treasure (လူးရတနာသိုက်) (2016)
- Oak Kyar Myet Pauk (အုတ်ကြားမြက်ပေါက်) (2016)
- Thu Ngal (သူငယ်) (2017)
- Kyun (ကျွန်) (2017)
- Sein Yauk Ma (စိန်ယောက်မ) (2018)
- Woman (ဣတ္ထိယ) (2018)
- Kiss Like Wine (အနမ်းဝိုင်) (2018)
- Kyway (ကြွေ) (2018)
- The Greatest Love (အခမ်းနားဆုံးမေတ္တာ) (2019)
- Players (ပလေယာ) (2020)
- Padauk Ka Tae Gita (ပိတောက်ကတဲ့ဂီတ) (2020)
- A Red Blanket (2023)

=== Television series ===
- A Yake (အရိပ်) (2018)
- Legends of Warriors (တစစ်တမက်ကိုယ်နှင့်သက်ကို) (2020)

== Books ==
- A Chit Sit Sit Myar (အချစ်စစ်စစ်များ)
- Maung A Twant (မောင့်အတွက်)
- Yone Kyi Ywae Khan Sar Ya The Khan Sar Ya Ywae Yone Kyi (ယုံကြည်၍ ခံစားရသည်၊ ခံစားရ၍ ယုံကြည်)
- Chit Mi Tae A Khar (ချစ်မိတဲ့အခါ)
- A Nar That Thit Sar (အနားသတ်သစ္စာ)
- Feeling 35

== Awards ==
Year	Award	Category	Film	Result
1994	Myanmar Motion Picture Academy Awards	Best Actress	Naw Yin Mwe	Won
1998	Myanmar Motion Picture Academy Awards	Best Actress	Shwe Nant Thar San Eain	Won
2007	Myanmar Motion Picture Academy Awards	Best Actress	Amay Hnint Thamee Myar	Nominated
2008	Myanmar Motion Picture Academy Awards	Best Actress	Kyoe Tann	Nominated
2009	Myanmar Motion Picture Academy Awards	Best Supporting Actress	Kyauk Sat Yay	Nominated
2012	Myanmar Motion Picture Academy Awards	Best Supporting Actress	Let Pan	Nominated
2017	Myanmar Motion Picture Academy Awards	Best Supporting Actress	Kyun	Nominated
2020	Myanmar Motion Picture Academy Awards	Best Supporting Actress	3(A)	Nominated
2018	Star Award	Best Supporting Actress	Kyun	Nominated
2023	Myanmar Motion Picture Academy Award	Best Actress	Bal Top Ma A Shone Ma Pay Buu (Never Give Up)	Won
