= Kyaw Ye Aung =

Burmese actor

- Born: Ko Ko Naing; 26 September 1966 (age 59); Bogale, Myanmar
- Years active: 1990 – present
- Parent(s): Myint Naing; Khin Hla
- Awards: Myanmar Academy Award (for 1996, 2007)

Kyaw Ye Aung (Burmese: ကျော်ရဲအောင်; born 26 September 1966) is a two-time Myanmar Academy Award winning Burmese actor . He won his first Myanmar Academy Award for Best Actor in 1996 with "Thar thame zanee Kyinwar" and achieved his second award for Best Actor in 2007 with "Koe sal sa thar late mal".

== Early life ==
Kyaw Ye Aung was born on Bogale, Ayeyawady Region, Myanmar. His parents are U Myint Naing and Daw Khin Hla.

== Personal life ==
Kyaw Ye Aung is married to Su Mon Hnin. He has two children: Htoo Myat KyawYeAung, the elder son, and Hmone Nathar KyawYeAung, the daughter.

== Filmography ==
=== Film ===
Over 297 films, including

- Pawpaw Papa Pyone (ပေါ့ပေါ့ပါးပါးပြုံး) (2004)

== Awards and nominations ==
Year	Award	Category	Nominated work	Result
1996	Myanmar Academy Award	Best Actor	Thar Thame Zanee Kyinyar	Won
2007	Myanmar Academy Award	Best Actor	Koe sal sa thar late mal	Won
