= Khin Hlaing =

Burmese actor, model and singer

- ခင်လှိုင်
- Born: Khin Hlaing; 17 April 1967 (age 59); Myanmar
- Occupations: Actor, Director, Comedian

Khin Hlaing (Burmese: ခင်လှိုင်; born 17 April 1967) is a Burmese comedian, director and actor. He was nominated for the Best Supporting Actor award at the 2015 Myanmar Academy Award for his performance in the film "Is this called love?" and also nominated for the Best Supporting Actor award at the 2016 Myanmar Academy Award for his performance in the film "Nga-Ba"

== Filmography ==
=== Film (cinema) ===
- Lae Sar (2006)
- Modern Yazawin (2014)
- Is this called love? (ဤအရာကိုအချစ်ဟုခေါ်သလား) (2016)
- Khoe Soe Lu Hnite (ခိုးဆိုးလုနှိုက်) (2016)
- Taw Kyi Kan (တောကျီးကန်း) (2017)
- Thar Beluu (သားဘီလူး) (2017)
- Original Gangster 2 (2017)
- LadyBoy (2019)
- Gyoe Yote (ချိုးရုပ်) (2019)
- Jin Party (2019)
- Yoma Paw Kya Tae Myet Yay (ရိုးမပေါ်ကျတဲ့မျက်ရည်) (2019)
- Players (2020)

== Awards and nominations ==
Year	Award	Category	Nominated work	Result
2015	Myanmar Academy Award	Best Supporting Actor	Is this called love?	Nominated
2016	Myanmar Academy Award	Best Supporting Actor	"Nga-Ba"	Nominated
