= List of Myanmar Motion Picture Academy Awards =

This is the List of Myanmar Motion Picture Academy Awards since 1952.

== 1952 Academy Awards ==
Award	Winner	Film
Best Picture	Chit Thet Wai	A1 Film Company
Best Picture (1st Runner-Up)	Ma-Yar Nae Lu-Pyo (Wife and Unmarried Man)	Aung Zeya Film Company
Best Picture (2nd Runner-Up)	Chit-Ywei Khaw-Yar	British Burma Film Company
Best Actor	Kyaw Win	Marlar Yi
Best Actress	Kyi Kyi Htay	Chit Thet Wai

== 1953 Academy Awards ==
Award	Winner	Film
Best Picture	Yadanabon	A1 Film Company
Best Picture (1st Runner-Up)	Thi Saung Hay-Man (This Cold Winter)	British Burma Film Company
Best Picture (2nd Runner-Up)	Mya Hay-Wun (Emerald Green Forest)	A1 Film Company
Best Actor	Tin Maung	Yadanabon
Best Actress	May Myint	Pwal Khar Nyaung-Yay

== 1954 Academy Awards ==
Award	Winner	Film
Best Picture	Aww! Mein-Ma (Oh! Woman)	British Burma Film Company
Best Picture (Runner-Up)	Aa Kyaw Aa Maw (Very Famous)	A1 Film Company
Best Director	Thukha	Aww! Mein-Ma (Oh! Woman)
Best Actor	(none awarded)	
Best Actress	A-May Pu	May May (My Mother)

== 1955 Academy Awards ==
Award	Winner	Film
Best Picture	Phoe Pyone Cho	Shwe Wal Thiri Film Company
Best Director	Chin Sein	Koh Yin-Thway (My Child)
Best Actor	Phoe Par Gyi	Phoe Pyone Cho
Best Actress	May Lwin	Chit Ma Ma (Lovely Older Sister)
Special Academy Award (Child Actress) as a male actor in this film	Win Mar	Phoe Pyone Cho

== 1956 Academy Awards ==
Award	Winner	Film
Best Picture	Bawa Thanthayar (Life's Samsara)	Mandalay Films
Best Director	Thukha	Bawa Thanthayar (Life's Samsara)
Best Actor	Zeya	Bawa Thanthayar (Life's Samsara)
Best Actress	Kyi Kyi Htay	Chit Khwint Ma Paing (Can't Own The Love)
Best Cinematography	Chit Phwe	Lwan Ngwe Ta Way Way (Miss Vapour to Wind)

== 1957 Academy Awards ==
Award	Winner	Film
Best Picture	Dr. Aung Kyaw Oo	British Burma Film Company
Best Director	Shwe Done Bi Aung	Dr. Aung Kyaw Oo
Best Actor	Htun Wai	Bo Mya Din
Best Actress	Myint Myint Khin	Chit Nyi-Ma (Lovely Younger Sister)
Best Cinematography	Tun Hlaing	Mya Pann Wut-Yi (Emerald Nectar)

== 1958 Academy Awards ==
Award	Winner	Film
Best Picture	Swal Tae Myit-Tar (Addicted to Love)	Mya Zaw Films
Best Director	Chit Khin	Phyay Shaw Khway
Best Actor	Kyaw Thaung	Phyay Shaw Khway
Best Actress	Myint Myint Khin	Phyay Shaw Khway
Best Cinematography	Htun Myint	Swal Tae Myit-Tar (Addicted to Love)

== 1959 Academy Awards ==
Award	Winner	Film
Best Picture	Chit Taw Chit Tal (I love You, But)	San Thaw Dar Films
Best Director	Thar Du	Ka Gyi Yay Ka (Ka Gyi to be Ka)
Best Actor	Htun Wai	Ka Gyi Yay Ka (Ka Gyi to be Ka), Chit Taw Chit Tal (I love You, But), Bo Aung Naing
Best Actress (tied)	Myat Mon	Ka Gyi Yay Ka (Ka Gyi to be Ka)
Best Actress (tied)	Daw Khin Nyunt	Ka Gyi Yay Ka (Ka Gyi to be Ka)
Best Cinematography	Ba Kyi	Bo Aung Naing

== 1960 Academy Awards ==
Award	Winner	Film
Best Picture	Yay Myay Sone Taing (Until the end of Land)	Mandalay Films
Best Director	Thar Du	Aa Ngo Lwal Thi (Lachrymose)
Best Actor	Maung Thin	Yay Myay Sone Taing (Until the end of Land), Chit Thway Thit Sar, Soe Par Nae May (Don't Bad, May)
Best Actress	May Thit	Myit Tar Shwe Yi (Golden Love)
Best Cinematography	Tin Yu	Myit Tar Shwe Yi (Golden Love)

== 1961 Academy Awards ==
Award	Winner	Film
Best Picture	Ko-Paing Myit Tar (My Own Love)	Mandalay Films
Best Director	Tekkatho Win Pe	Pyi-Tan-Tae Kyi Zan (Very Expensive Cartridge)
Best Actor	Myat Lay	Aa Mone Ei Nauk Wal (Back of Hate)
Best Actress	Khin Yu May	Ko-Paing Myit Tar (My Own Love)
Best Cinematography	Maung Kalay and U Paw	Ko-Paing Myit Tar (My Own Love)

== 1962 Academy Awards ==
Award	Winner	Film
Best Picture	(none awarded)	(none)
Best Director	(none awarded)	(none)
Best Actor	(none awarded)	(none)
Best Actress	Thi Thi	A-Twei
Best Supporting Actor	Kyauk Lone	A-Twei
Best Supporting Actress	May Nwae	Shwe Yin Thein Thit
Best Cinematography	(none awarded)	(none)

== 1964 Academy Awards ==
Award	Winner	Film
Best Picture	(none awarded)	(none)
Best Director	(none awarded)	(none)
Best Actor	(none awarded)	(none)
Best Actress	(none awarded)	(none)
Best Supporting Actor	Kyauk Lone	Yin Wal Ta Theint Theint (Vibrate at My Heart)
Best Supporting Actress	May Thit	Yin Wal Ta Theint Theint (Vibrate at My Heart)
Best Cinematography	Ba Kyi	Chein Mi Lay Thaw Nya (My Dating Night)

== 1965 Academy Awards ==
Award	Winner	Film
Best Picture	(none awarded)	-
Best Director	(none awarded)	-
Best Actor	(none awarded)	-
Best Actress	Wah Wah Win Shwe	Chit Tha-Mee (My Lovely Daughter)
Best Supporting Actor	Kyauk Lone	Chit Tha-Mee (My Lovely Daughter)
Best Supporting Actress	Tin Tin Mu	Thel-Lun-Za (Clue)
Best Cinematography	(none awarded)	-

== 1966 Academy Awards ==
Award	Winner	Film
Best Picture	Saung (Winter)	A1 Film Company
Best Director	(none awarded)	-
Best Actor	(none awarded)	-
Best Actress	San Shar Tin	Saung (Winter)
Best Supporting Actor	Soe Shwe	Myay-Mhar Pwint-Thaw Myit-Tar Pann (The Love Flower Which Blooms at Ground)
Best Supporting Actress	(none awarded)	-
Best Cinematography	(none awarded)	-

== 1967 Academy Awards ==
Award	Winner	Film
Best Picture	(none awarded)	-
Best Director	Tin Maung	Ko Yal Toe Yal Soe Soe Yal
Best Actor	Win Oo	Saung Einmet (The Winter Dream)
Best Actress	Khin Than Nu	Ko Yal Toe Yal Soe Soe Yal (I, Toe and Soe Soe)
Best Supporting Actor	(none awarded)	-
Best Supporting Actress	(none awarded)	-
Best Cinematography	(none awarded)	-

== 1968 Academy Awards ==
Award	Winner	Film
Best Picture	Zaga Pyaw Thaw Athè-Hnalon (Talking Heart)	Thukha Films
Best Director	Thukha	Zaga Pyaw Thaw Athè-Hnalon (Talking Heart)
Best Actor	Nyunt Win	Bando Lu-Lay Nae Thuzar
Best Actress	Sandar	Hna-Mhwar Athè (Two Segments of Heart)
Best Supporting Actor	Thein Maung	Zaga Pyaw Thaw Athè-Hnalon (Talking Heart)
Best Supporting Actress	Khin Moe Moe	A-Pal Yadanar
Best Cinematography	Than Maung	Hna-Mhwar Athè (Two Segments of Heart)

== 1969 Academy Awards ==
Award	Winner	Film
Best Picture	(none awarded)	-
Best Director	(none awarded)	-
Best Actor	Kawleikgyin Ne Win	Payin Yaung (The Colour Amber)
Best Actress	Wah Wah Win Shwe	Chaung Ko Pyit Ywei Myit Ko Shar (Neglect to Stream and Search the River)
Best Supporting Actor	(none awarded)	-
Best Supporting Actress	Thein Shin	A-Thet Ko Hnin Ywei
Best Cinematography	San Aye	Myit-Tar Ko-Zarr Hnin Ba Mal

== 1970 Academy Awards ==
Award	Winner	Film
Best Picture	Hmone Shwe Yee	A-Paung Letkhanar Films
Best Director	Thukha	Kyama Hmar Mein-Ma-Ther (I am the Girl)
Best Actor	Win Oo	Hmone Shwe Yee
Best Actress	Tin Tin Nwet	Kyama Hmar Mein-Ma-Ther (I am the Girl)
Best Supporting Actor	Bo Ba Ko	Thidar Pyone
Best Supporting Actress	Kyi Kyi Htay	Nu Nu Nge Nge (Very Young)
Best Cinematography	San Aye	La-Kwal Moe Hnaung

== 1971 Academy Awards ==
Award	Winner	Film
Best Picture	(none awarded)	-
Best Director	Maung Wunna	Gadiba Hpanat Si, Shwe Hti Saung (Wearing Velvet Slippers under a Golden Umbrella)
Best Actor	Nyunt Win	Chit-Thu Waing Waing Lal
Best Actress	Daisy Kyaw Win	Arr Nwae Thu Par Shin (I am a weak girl)
Best Supporting Actor	Bo Ba Ko	Da Gwei Da Ka-Bar
Best Supporting Actress	Aye Aye Thin	Mar-Yar Htaung-Gyauk (Artifice Trap)
Best Cinematography	Sonny Tin	Ta-Char Ka-Bar Ka Chit-Thu Yal (My Dear Love from Other World)

== 1972 Academy Awards ==
Award	Winner	Film
Best Picture	(none awarded)	-
Best Director	Maung Tin Oo	Nay Htwet Thaw Nya (Sunrise at Night)
Best Actor	(none awarded)	-
Best Actress	(none awarded)	-
Best Supporting Actor	(none awarded)	-
Best Supporting Actress	(none awarded)	-
Best Cinematography	Hla Pe	Nay Htwet Thaw Nya (Sunrise at Night)

== 1973 Academy Awards ==
Award	Winner	Film
Best Picture	Bal Thu Pyaing Lo Hla Par Taw Naing (Who Can Be More Beautiful?)	Thukha Films
Best Director	Thukha	BaThu-Pyaing-Loh Hla-Par-Taw-Naing (Who Can Be More Beautiful?)
Best Actor	(none awarded)	-
Best Actress	Myint Myint Khin	Mone Par Tal Maung Ko (To My Hate Darling)
Best Supporting Actor	Ahn Kyaw	BaThu-Pyaing-Loh Hla-Bar-Taw-Naing (Who Can Be More Beautiful?)
Best Supporting Actress	Aye Aye Thin	Zar Khen-Sie Nauk-Kwe Mhar (Back of Lace Curtain)
Best Cinematography	San Myint	Eain-Met Da-Dar (Dream Bridge)

== 1974 Academy Awards ==
Award	Winner	Film
Best Picture	(none awarded)	-
Best Director	(none awarded)	-
Best Actor	(none awarded)	-
Best Actress	Nwet Nwet Mu	Naw Kue Ma
Best Supporting Actor	Aung Lwin	Naw Kue Ma
Best Supporting Actress	(none awarded)	-
Best Cinematography	(none awarded)	-

== 1975 Academy Awards ==
Award	Winner	Film
Best Picture	Shwe-Chi Ngwe-Chi Tan-Bar-Loh (Gold and Silver Ribbons)	Min Thurein Films
Best Director	Thukha	Shwe-Chi Ngwe-Chi Tan-Bar-Loh (Gold and Silver Ribbons)
Best Actor	(none awarded)	-
Best Actress	Khin Yu May	Shwe-Chi Ngwe-Chi Tan-Bar-Loh (Gold and Silver Ribbons)
Best Supporting Actor	Myint Naing	Kyay Zue Ka-Bar (A lot of Thanks)
Best Supporting Actress	May Nwae	Shwe-Chi Ngwe-Chi Tan-Bar-Loh (Gold and Silver Ribbons)
Best Cinematography	Sonny Tin	Kya-Naw Nae Ko Ba Kyaw (I and Ko Ba Kyaw)

== 1976 Academy Awards ==
Award	Winner	Film
Best Picture	HnaLonThar Nae Sit Tar-Wun (My Heart and Soldier's Duty)	Pyi Kyaw Films
Best Director	Sein Pe Tin	HnaLonThar Nae Sit Tar-Wun (My Heart and Soldier's Duty)
Best Actor	(none awarded)	-
Best Actress	(none awarded)	-
Best Supporting Actor	(none awarded)	-
Best Supporting Actress	May Thit	Nwae Myo Son Lin Nwae Lai Chin
Best Cinematography	San Maung	Kyun-Ka-Lay Mhar Hna-Yauk-Htel (Only Two People at Small Island)

== 1977 Academy Awards ==
Award	Winner	Film
Best Picture	(none awarded)	-
Best Director	(none awarded)	-
Best Actor	Sein Myint	A-Fay Ta-Khu, Thar Ta-Khu
Best Actress	Wah Wah Win Shwe	Mein-Ka-Lay Shin Yae Hsan-Da
Best Supporting Actor	(none awarded)	-
Best Supporting Actress	Swe Zin Htaik	MeinKaLay Shin Yae Hsan-Da
Best Cinematography	Pan Aye	Nay-Chi Phyar Mha Nwe Thaw Kyaunt (Because, It is Warm from the Sun's Light)
Best Child Actor (Special Academy Award)	Aung Htun Lay	A-Fay Ta-Khu, Thar Ta-Khu

== 1978 Academy Awards ==
Award	Winner	Film
Best Picture	(none awarded)	-
Best Director	Maung Tin Oo	Ta-Khar-Ka Ta Bawa (Life, Once Upon A Time)
Best Actor	(none awarded)	-
Best Actress	Khin Thidar Htun	Ta-Khar-Ka Ta Bawa (Life, Once Upon A Time)
Best Supporting Actor	Phoe Par Gyi	Ta-Khar-Ka Ta Bawa (Life, Once Upon A Time)
Best Supporting Actress	Kyi Kyi Htay	Lu Zaw
Best Cinematography	Tin Win	Ta-Khar-Ka Ta Bawa (Life, Once Upon A Time)
Special Academy Award (Child Actor)	England Sein	Myit-Tar-Shin-Ma-Lay Nyein Nyein Ei (Girl Nyein Nyein Ei who has Benevolence)

== 1979 Academy Awards ==
Award	Winner	Film
Best Picture	(none awarded)	-
Best Director	(none awarded)	-
Best Actor	Kyaw Hein	Akar-Ka Aa-Chit AaNhit-Ka Myit-Tar (Albumen is Love, Yolk is Affection)
Best Actress	Cho Pyone	Chit A-Hmya
Best Supporting Actor	Kawleikgyin Ne Win	Akar-Ka Aa-Chit AaNhit-Ka Myit-Tar (Albumen is Love, Yolk is Affection)
Best Supporting Actress	Sein Khin	Akar-Ka Aa-Chit AaNhit-Ka Myit-Tar (Albumen is Love, Yolk is Affection)
Best Cinematography	San Maung	Kyaw Ko Chit Ma Lar, Zaw Ko Chit Ma Lar (Do you love Kyaw or Do you love Zaw?)

== 1980 Academy Awards ==
Award	Winner	Film
Best Picture	Kyi Pyar	Yamona Films
Best Director	Kyee Myint	Kyi Pyar
Best Actor	(none awarded)	-
Best Actress	May Win Maung	Kyi Pyar
Best Supporting Actor	Seinn Aung	Mha Ta-Bar A-Cher Ma-Shi-Pyi (Nothing Apart from That)
Best Supporting Actress	Myint Myint Khin	Mha Ta-Bar A-Cher Ma-Shi-Pyi (Nothing Apart from That)
Best Cinematography	Chit Min Lu	Nwe Yu-Pa

== 1981 Academy Awards ==
Award	Winner	Film
Best Picture	(none awarded)	-
Best Director	Win Pe	Hnin-Si-Ni Eain-Met (Red Rose Dream)
Best Actor	(none awarded)	-
Best Actress	Tin Tin Nyo	Nge Nan-Mal A-Nyo (My Childhood Name is A-Nyo)
Best Supporting Actor	(none awarded)	-
Best Supporting Actress	May Yu	Hnin-Si-Ni Eain-Met (Red Rose Dream)
Best Cinematography	San Maung	A- Pyan-Lan (Street of Return)

== 1982 Academy Awards ==
Award	Winner	Film
Best Picture	(none awarded)	-
Best Director	(none awarded)	-
Best Actor	Kyaw Hein	Mon Tae Chein Twin Nay Win Thi (Sunset at Noon)
Best Actress	Cho Pyone	Mon Tae Chein Twin Nay Win Thi (Sunset at Noon)
Best Supporting Actor	Nay Aung	Milarshikar Sai Bay-Dar
Best Supporting Actress	Khaing Khin Oo	Myit-Tar A-Thin-Chay (Countless Number of Love)
Best Cinematography	Aung Myint Oo	Milarshikar Sai Bay-Dar

== 1983 Academy Awards ==
Award	Winner	Film
Best Picture	(none awarded)	-
Best Director	Htun Myint Htun	Eihtiya Khaw Mein-Ma Doh-Thi (Women also called Eihtiya are ...)
Best Actor	Nyunt Win	Ta-Ti-Ya A-Ywal Ei Duh-Ti-Ya Way-Da-Nar (The Second Heartbreak of the Third Age)
Best Actress	Khin Thidar Htun	Eihtiya Khaw Mein-Ma Doh-Thi (Women also called Eihtiya are ...)
Best Supporting Actor	Htun Wai	Ta-Ti-Ya A-Ywal Ei Duh-Ti-Ya Way-Da-Nar (The Second Heartbreak of the Third Age)
Best Supporting Actress	San Shar Tin	Seinn Nae Tay-Zar (Seinn and Tay-Zar)
Best Cinematography	San Aye	Bo Than Khel

== 1984 Academy Awards ==
Award	Winner	Film
Best Picture	(none awarded)	-
Best Director	(none awarded)	-
Best Actor	(none awarded)	-
Best Actress	(none awarded)	-
Best Supporting Actor	Myat Lay	Yin-Del-Mhar Ywar Thaw Moe
Best Supporting Actress	Moh Moh Myint Aung	HnaLonThar Myo-Taw (City of Heart)
Best Cinematography	Chit Min Lu	HnaLonThar Myo-Taw (City of Heart)

== 1985 Academy Awards ==
Award	Winner	Film
Best Picture	Thingyan Moe (Rain in the Water Festival)	Thuriya Pyin-Nyar Films
Best Director	Maung Tin Oo	Thingyan Moe (Rain in the Water Festival)
Best Actor	Nay Aung	Pan-Thi-Dae Kyoe
Best Actress	Khin Thidar Htun	Pan-Thi-Dae Kyoe
Best Supporting Actor	Htun Htun Naing	Chit Mee-Hlyan-Del-Ka May Cho
Best Supporting Actress	Khin Soe Paing	Pan-Thi-Dae Kyoe
Best Cinematography	Chit Min Lu	Thingyan Moe (Rain in the Water Festival)

== 1986 Academy Awards ==
Award	Winner	Film
Best Picture		
Best Director		
Best Actor		
Best Actress		
Best Supporting Actor		
Best Supporting Actress		
Best Cinematography		

== 1987 Academy Awards ==
Award	Winner	Film
Best Picture		
Best Director		
Best Actor		
Best Actress		
Best Supporting Actor		
Best Supporting Actress		
Best Cinematography		

== 1988 Academy Awards ==
Award	Winner	Film
Best Picture		
Best Director		
Best Actor		
Best Actress		
Best Supporting Actor		
Best Supporting Actress		
Best Cinematography		

== 1989 Academy Awards ==
Award	Winner	Film
Best Picture	Doe	Aa-Myo-Ther Films
Best Director	Kyi Soe Htun	Doe
Best Actor	Kyaw Hein	Pann-Myaing-Lal-Ka Oo-Yin-Mhuu (The Gardener among the Flowers)
Best Actress	Moh Moh Myint Aung	Khat-Seinn-Seinn Nay-Ba-Mal (Behave like Strangers)
Best Supporting Actor	(none awarded)	-
Best Supporting Actress	(none awarded)	-
Best Cinematography	(none awarded)	-

== 1990 Academy Awards ==
Award	Winner	Film
Best Picture	(none awarded)	-
Best Director	Maung Wunna	Khunnit-Sin A-Lwan (Seventh Degree Multiple Sorrow)
Best Actor	Thu Maung	Khunnit-Sin A-Lwan (Seventh Degree Multiple Sorrow)
Best Actress	Khin Than Nu	Khunnit-Sin A-Lwan (Seventh Degree Multiple Sorrow)
Best Supporting Actor	Zaw Lwin	A-Yaing Zabel (Wild Jasmine Tree)
Best Supporting Actress	(none awarded)	-
Best Cinematography	U Kyi	A-Chit-Sone-Thu-Yae Yin-Mhar (At Heart of My Lovest Person)

== 1991 Academy Awards ==
Award	Winner	Film
Best Picture	(none awarded)	-
Best Director	(none awarded)	-
Best Actor	Yan Aung	Mal Thidar Lo Mein-Ka-Lay (The Girl like Mal Thidar)
Best Actress	Moh Moh Myint Aung	Tha-Mee Nae A-May Myer (Daughter and Mothers)
Best Supporting Actor	(none awarded)	-
Best Supporting Actress	Myint Myint Khaing	Tha-Mee Nae A-May Myer (Daughter and Mothers)
Best Cinematography	Pan Aye	Dan-Dar-Yi (Legend)
Best Music	Gita Lulin Maung Ko Ko	Mal Thidar Lo Mein-Ka-Lay (The Girl like Mal Thidar)

== 1992 Academy Awards ==
Award	Winner	Film
Best Picture	(none awarded)	-
Best Director	(none awarded)	-
Best Actor	(none awarded)	-
Best Actress	May Than Nu	Mu Paing Chit Thu (Exclusive Sweetheart)
Best Supporting Actor	(none awarded)	-
Best Supporting Actress	(none awarded)	-
Best Cinematography	Than Maung	Thakhut Pan (Trumpet Flower)
Best Music	Trumpet Win Oo	Khine Mar Lar Hnin Si

== 1993 Academy Awards ==
Award	Winner	Film
Best Picture	Thidar Khunnit-Tan	Khine Thazin Films
Best Director	Maung Nanda	Thidar Khunnit-Tan
Best Actor	Ye Aung	Myit-Toh-Ei Mar-Yar (Artifice of Rivers)
Best Actress	Zin Mar Oo	Thidar Khunnit-Tan
Best Supporting Actor	Nyunt Win	Thidar Khunnit-Tan
Best Supporting Actress	San San Aye	Sein-Khaw Nay Thaw A-Chit
Best Cinematography	Than Nyunt (Pan Thar)	Myit-Toh-Ei Mar-Yar (Artifice of Rivers)
Best Music	(none awarded)	(none)

== 1994 Academy Awards ==
Award	Winner	Film
Best Picture	Ta Pyi Thu Ma Shwe Htar	Zin Yaw Film Production
Best Director	Zin Yaw Maung Maung	Ta Pyi Thu Ma Shwe Htar
Best Actor	Kyaw Thu	Ta Pyi Thu Ma Shwe Htar
Best Actress (tied)	Soe Myat Thuzar	Naw Yin Mhwe
Best Actress (tied)	Moh Moh Myint Aung	Ma Thudamasari
Best Supporting Actor	Kyaw Hein	Wai Lae Hmway Kyway Lae Hmway
Best Supporting Actress	Nwae Nwae San	Tharaphu (The Crown)
Best Cinematography	Ko Ko Htay	Ma Thudamasari
Best Music	Sandayar Hla Htut	Ta Pyi Thu Ma Shwe Htar
Best Sound	Khin Oo	Tharaphu (The Crown)

== 1995 Academy Awards ==
Award	Winner	Film
Best Picture	Taik-Pwel Khaw Than	Khin Zabel Oo Films
Best Director	Maung Tin Oo	Taik-Pwel Khaw Than
Best Screenplay	Aung Kyi Htun	Taik-Pwel Khaw Than
Best Actor (tied)	Yan Aung	Bagan Mhar Thar Dae La (Bright Moon at Bagan)
Best Actor (tied)	Soe Thu	Aung Myin Thaw Nei
Best Actress	May Than Nu	Bagan Mhar Thar Dae La (Bright Moon at Bagan)
Best Supporting Actor	Zaw Lin	Taik-Pwel Khaw Than
Best Supporting Actress	Myint Myint Khaing	Aung Myin Thaw Nei
Best Cinematography	Than Nyunt	Bagan Mhar Thar Dae La (Bright Moon at Bagan)
Best Music	Gita Lulin Maung Ko Ko	Taik-Pwel Khaw Than
Best Sound	(none awarded)	-

== 1996 Academy Awards ==
Award	Winner	Film
Best Picture	Pann Tha-Khin	Yamona Films
Best Director	Kyee Myint	Pann Tha-Khin
Best Screenplay	(none awarded)	-
Best Actor (tied)	Yan Aung	A-Lin Phyaw Kaung-Kin (Pale Light Sky)
Best Actor (tied)	Kyaw Ye Aung	Thar Tha-Mee Za-Nee Kyin-Yar (Son, Daughter, Wife and Spouse)
Best Actress (tied)	Htet Htet Moe Oo	Pann Tha-Khin
Best Actress (tied)	May Than Nu	A-Lin Phyaw Kaung-Kin (Pale Light Sky)
Best Supporting Actor	Zaw Lin	Pann Tha-Khin
Best Supporting Actress	Myint Myint Khin	Myit-Mo Taung Oo Ma Ka Kyuu Thar (More Than Mount Myint-Mo)
Best Cinematography	Chit Min Lu	Chit Yee-Zar (Lovely Sweetheart)
Best Music	(none awarded)	-
Best Sound	(none awarded)	-

== 1997 Academy Awards ==
Award	Winner	Film
Best Picture	Never Shall We Be Enslaved	Myat Mi-Khin Films
Best Director	Kyi Soe Tun	Never Shall We Be Enslaved
Best Screenplay	Myet-Khin Thit, ThuKhuMa Lwin-Pyin	Myint Myat HnaLonThar (Noble Heart)
Best Actor	Dwe	A-May Chey-Yar (Foot Print of Mother)
Best Actress	Pan Phyu	A-Yeik (Shadow)
Best Supporting Actor (tied)	Nyunt Win	Never Shall We Be Enslaved
Best Supporting Actor (tied)	Zin Wine	Myint Myat HnaLonThar (Noble Heart)
Best Supporting Actress	Cho Pyone	A-May Chey-Yar (Foot Print of Mother)
Best Cinematography	Ko Ko Htay	Myint Myat HnaLonThar (Noble Heart)
Best Music	Zaw Myo Htut	Myint Myat HnaLonThar (Noble Heart)
Best Sound	Sein Myint	Myint Myat HnaLonThar (Noble Heart)
Best Editing	U Myint Khaing	Never Shall We Be Enslaved

== 1998 Academy Awards ==
Award	Winner	Film
Best Picture	A-Hnaing-Mae Yin-Khwin (Inimitable Heart)	Malikha Films
Best Director	Malikha Soe Htaik Aung	A-Hnaing-Mae Yin-Khwin (Inimitable Heart)
Best Screenplay	Ko Ko Lay	A-Hnaing-Mae Yin-Khwin (Inimitable Heart)
Best Actor	Yan Aung	Nya Min-Thar (Prince of Night)
Best Actress	Soe Myat Thuzar	Shwe Nant-Thar San-Eain
Best Supporting Actor	(none awarded)	-
Best Supporting Actress	Nandar Hlaing	Shwe Nant-Thar San-Eain
Best Cinematography	Than Nyunt	Nya Min-Thar (Prince of Night)
Best Music	(none awarded)	-
Best Sound	(none awarded)	-
Best Editing	(none awarded)	-

== 1999 Academy Awards ==
Award	Winner	Film
Best Picture	A-Fay Nay-Yar (Position of Daddy)	Thiha Zaw Films
Best Director	Khin Maung Oo + Soe Thein Htut	A-Fay Nay-Yar (Position of Daddy)
Best Screenplay	(none awarded)	-
Best Actor	Lwin Moe	Yin-Del-Ka Saung Yar-Thi (Winter in My Heart)
Best Actress	Htun Eaindra Bo	Hnaung Ta Mye Mye (Deep and Unforgettable Sorrow)
Best Supporting Actor	Htun Htun Win	Hnaung Htaune Phwal Myit-Tar (Knot Love)
Best Supporting Actress	Myat Kay Thi Aung	Yin-Del-Ka Saung Yar-Thi (Winter in My Heart)
Best Cinematography	(none awarded)	-
Best Music	(none awarded)	-
Best Sound	(none awarded)	-
Best Editing	(none awarded)	-
Best Child Actress (Special Academy Award)	Ei Phyu Soe	Yin-Del-Ka Saung Yar-Thi (Winter in My Heart)

== 2000 Academy Awards ==
Award	Winner	Film
Best Picture	Nga-Ye Thar (Denizen of Hell)	Khin Zabel Oo Films
Best Director	Thiha Tin Soe	Nga-Ye Thar (Denizen of Hell)
Best Screenplay	(none awarded)	-
Best Actor (tied)	Thiha Tin Soe	Nga-Ye Thar (Denizen of Hell)
Best Actor (tied)	Yan Aung	Maw-Ha Myin-Pyaing Myar (Ignorance Parallel Lines)
Best Actress	Myo Thandar Htun	Hnat-Khan Htet-Ka Dar-Thwar (The Blade at the above of Lip)
Best Supporting Actor	Aung Khaing	Nga-Ye Thar (Denizen of Hell)
Best Supporting Actress	Khin Than Nu	Tha-Mee Shin
Best Cinematography	Than Nyunt	Maung Mu Paing Shin
Best Music	(none awarded)	-
Best Sound	(none awarded)	-
Best Editing	(none awarded)	-

== 2001 Academy Awards ==
Award	Winner	Film
Best Picture	HnaLon Hla Lu Mike (Good-hearted Stupid Person)	Myit-Tar Yaung-Pyan Films
Best Director	Maung Tin Oo	HnaLon Hla Lu Mike (Good-hearted Stupid Person)
Best Screenplay	Khin Lay Theint	Pann Ta Pwint Phan-Sin-Gyin (Creating A Flower)
Best Actor (tied)	Min Maw Kun	HnaLon Hla Lu Mike (Good-hearted Stupid Person)
Best Actor (tied)	Lwin Moe	Pann Ta Pwint Phan-Sin-Gyin (Creating A Flower)
Best Actress (tied)	May Than Nu	Chit Chin Ei A-Char Mae Hnaike (Another Side of Love)
Best Actress (tied)	Htet Htet Moe Oo	Tha-Mee Mike (Stupid Daughter)
Best Supporting Actor	Nay Aung	HnaLon Hla Lu Mike (Good-hearted Stupid Person)
Best Supporting Actress (tied)	May Thinzar Oo	HnaLon Hla Lu Mike (Good-hearted Stupid Person)
Best Supporting Actress (tied)	Soe Myat Nandar	A-Chit Ta-khu Mwe Phwar Chin (Birth a love)
Best Cinematography	Ko Ko Htay	Kaung-Kin Htet Ka Pann Ta Pwint (A Flower from Sky)
Best Music	(none awarded)	-
Best Sound	(none awarded)	-
Best Editing	(none awarded)	-

== 2002 Academy Awards ==
Award	Winner	Film
Best Picture (tied)	Hsan Yay (Upstream)	Seinn-War-Ni Films
Best Picture (tied)	Ngar Thu-Ta-Bar Yauk-Kyer Mein-Ma (Me, Another, Men, Women)	Kyal Ta Gun Films
Best Director (tied)	Pan Gyi Soe Moe	Ngar Thu-Ta-Bar Yauk-Kyer Mein-Ma (Me, Another, Men, Women)
Best Director (tied)	Kyi Soe Htun	Hsan Yay (Upstream)
Best Screenplay	Nyein Min	Ngar Thu-Ta-Bar Yauk-Kyer Mein-Ma (Me, Another, Men, Women)
Best Actor	Lu Min	Shwe Mhone Kyel Dae Kaung-Kin
Best Actress	Khin Zar Kyi Kyaw	Ngar Thu-Ta-Bar Yauk-Kyer Mein-Ma (Me, Another, Men, Women)
Best Supporting Actor	Nyunt Win	Hsan Yay' (Upstream)
Best Supporting Actress	May Than Nu	Ngar Thu-Ta-Bar Yauk-Kyer Mein-Ma (Me, Another, Men, Women)
Best Cinematography	Kyauk Phyu (Pa Day Thar)	Yauk-Kha-Ma So-Dar Ta-Khar-Don-Ka Tha-Met Par Bel (Father-in-law was Son-in-law, Once Upon A Time)
Best Music	Gita LuLin Maung Ko Ko	Hsan Yay (Upstream) Best Music Khin Maung Gyi Ngar Thu-Ta-Bar Yauk-Kyer Mein-Ma (Me, Another, Men, Women)

|- | Best Sound | Phoe Htaung and Group | Hsan Yay (Upstream) |- | Best Editing | Zaw Min (Han Thar Myay) | Ngar Thu-Ta-Bar Yauk-Kyer Mein-Ma (Me, Another, Men, Women) |}

== 2003 Academy Awards ==
Award	Winner	Film
Best Picture	A-May Noh-Boe (Value of Mother's Milk)	Aa-Myo-Ther Films
Best Director	Kyaw Thu	A-May Noh-Boe (Value of Mother's Milk)
Best Screenplay	Nyein Min	A-May Noh-Boe (Value of Mother's Milk)
Best Actor	Kyaw Hein	Nay-Ka-Mway-Tae-La
Best Actress	Htun Eaindra Bo	A-May Noh-Boe (Value of Mother's Milk)
Best Supporting Actor	Zaw Oo	A-May Noh-Boe (Value of Mother's Milk)
Best Supporting Actress	Cho Pyone	A-May Noh-Boe (Value of Mother's Milk)
Best Cinematography	Kyauk Phyu (Pa Day Thar)	A-May Noh-Boe (Value of Mother's Milk)
Best Music	Zaw Myo Htut	Nay-Ka-Mway-Tae-La
Best Sound	Khin Sabel Oo Group	Thu-Mwie-Hta Thit-Sar
Best Editing	U Myint Khaing	Thu-Mwie-Hta Thit-Sar

== 2004 Academy Awards ==
Award	Winner	Film
Best Picture	Hlyo-hwat-thaw-hnin (Mystery of Snow)	Zin Yaw Film Production
Best Director	Zin Yaw Maung Maung	Hlyo-hwat-thaw-hnin (Mystery of Snow)
Best Screenplay	Nyein Min	Hlyo-hwat-thaw-hnin (Mystery of Snow)
Best Actor	Lwin Moe	Ta-Khar-Ka Ayeyarwady Nya Myer (Ayeyarwady Nights, Once Upon A Time)
Best Actress	Eaindra Kyaw Zin	Myet-Hnar Myar Dae Moe-Kaung-Kin (Two-faced Sky)
Best Supporting Actor	Nyunt Win	Hlyo-hwat-thaw-hnin (Mystery of Snow)
Best Supporting Actress	Soe Myat Nandar	Chit-Chin Nge Pyaing
Best Cinematography	Ko Ko Htay (Htake Tan)	Hlyo-hwat-thaw-hnin (Mystery of Snow)
Best Music	Sein Mutter	Pann Dan-Dar-Yi (Flower Legend)
Best Sound	Aye Myint	Hlyo-hwat-thaw-hnin (Mystery of Snow)
Best Editing	Zaw Min (Han Thar Myay)	Hlyo-hwat-thaw-hnin (Mystery of Snow)

== 2005 Academy Awards ==
The Myanmar Motion Picture Academy Awards presentation ceremony for 2005 was held for the first time in Naypyidaw on 5 March 2007. The awards were selected out of 16 films screened during the year of 2005.

Award	Winner	Film
Best Picture	Kyansit Min (King Kyan Sit)	Everest Film Production
Best Director	Kyi Soe Htun	Sa-Hta-Gan (Hexagon)
Best Screenplay	Kyi Soe Htun	Sa-Hta-Gan (Hexagon)
Best Actor	Lu Min	Kyansit Min (King Kyan Sit)
Best Actress	Htun Eaindra Bo	Mogok Set-Waing Ko Kyaw-Lun Ywe (Beyond the Horizon)
Best Supporting Actor	ChanThar Kyi Soe	Sa-Hta-Gan (Hexagon)
Best Supporting Actress	Myat Kay Thi Aung	Chit-Chin-Phwae Myit-Tar
Best Cinematography	Naing Nu Shein	Mogok Set-Waing Ko Kyaw-Lun Ywe (Beyond the Horizon)
Best Music	Khin Maung Gyi	Kyansit Min (King Kyan Sit)
Best Sound	Richard Ye Win	Kyansit Min (King Kyan Sit)
Best Editing	Aung Thwin	Sa-Hta-Gan (Hexagon)

== 2006 Academy Awards ==
The Myanmar Motion Picture Academy Awards presentation ceremony for 2006 was held in Naypyidaw on 7 February 2008. The awards were selected out of 10 films screened during the year of 2006.

Award	Winner	Film
Best Picture	Hmyaw-Link-Gyin Myar-Swar (With Much Hope)	Nawarat Films
Best Director	Maung Myo Min (Made in Heart)	Hmyaw-Link-Gyin Myar-Swar (With Much Hope)
Best Screenplay	Zaw Myint Oo	Taung-Tha-Man Thit-Sar
Best Actor	Yan Aung	Gon-Shein Pyin-Dae Chit-Chin Theik-Khar
Best Actress	Nandar Hlaing	Taung-Tha-Man Thit-Sar
Best Supporting Actor	Phoe Kyaw	Hmyaw-Link-Gyin Myar-Swar (With Much Hope)
Best Supporting Actress	May Thinzar Oo	Pann-Pyo-Thu-Doh A-Lin-Gar
Best Cinematography	Than Nyunt (Pan Thar)	Pann-Pyo-Thu-Doh A-Lin-Gar
Best Music	Thaw Zin (La Wun Eain)	Pann-Pyo-Thu-Doh A-Lin-Gar
Best Sound	Myo Nyunt	Taung-Tha-Man Thit-Sar
Best Editing	Zaw Min (Han Thar Myay)	Hmyaw-Link-Gyin Myar-Swar (With Much Hope)

== 2007 Academy Awards ==
Award	Winner	Film
Best Picture	Koe-Sal-Hsa Thar-Lein-Mal (Ninety Times More Superior)	Myint Mar Lar Film Production
Best Director	Maung Yin Aung (Myo-Taw)	Koe-Sal-Hsa Thar-Lein-Mal (Ninety Times More Superior)
Best Screenplay	(none awarded)	-
Best Actor	Kyaw Ye Aung	Koe-Sal-Hsa Thar-Lein-Mal (Ninety Times More Superior)
Best Supporting Actor	Moe Di	Koe-Sal-Hsa Thar-Lein-Mal (Ninety Times More Superior)
Best Cinematography	Kyauk Phyu (Pa Day Thar)	Nga-Dar Nga-Thway Nga-Ayeyarwady (My Sword, My Blood, My Ayeyarwady)
Best Music	Sein Mutter (Mandalay)	Koe-Sal-Hsa Thar-Lein-Mal (Ninety Times More Superior)
Best Sound	(none awarded)	-
Best Editing	(none awarded)	-

== 2008 Academy Awards ==
The Myanmar Motion Picture Academy Awards presentation ceremony for 2008 was held on 6 February 2010 in Naypyidaw. The awards were selected out of 12 films screened in 2008.

Award	Winner	Film
Best Picture	A-Myer Nae Ma Thet Hsaing Thaw Thu (The Man who foreign to Public)	Myat Chal Films
Best Director	Nyi Nyi Htun Lwin	A-Myer Nae Ma Thet Hsaing Thaw Thu (The Man who foreign to Public)
Best Screenplay	(none awarded)	-
Best Actor	Khant Si Thu	A-Myer Nae Ma Thet Hsaing Thaw Thu (The Man who foreign to Public)
Best Actress	Moh Moh Myint Aung	Myint-Mo Htet Ka Tharaphu (Crown atop Mount Myint-Mo)
Best Supporting Actor	Ye Aung	Academy Shot
Best Supporting Actress	Khin Moht Moht Aye	A-Myer Nae Ma Thet Hsaing Thaw Thu (The Man who foreign to Public)
Best Cinematography	Than Nyunt	Kyoe-Dan (Rope Line)
Best Music	(none awarded)	-
Best Sound	(none awarded)	-
Best Editing	(none awarded)	-

== 2009 Academy Awards ==
The Myanmar Motion Picture Academy Awards presentation ceremony for 2009 was held on 23 January 2011 in Naypyidaw. The awards were selected out of 16 films screened in 2009.

Award	Winner	Film
Best Picture	Gyo-Gyar Taung-Ban Khat Than (The Sound of Flutter of Crane Bird)	Zin Yaw Film Production
Best Director	Mee Pwar	Zaw Ka Ka Nay The (Dancing the Zawgyi Dance)
Best Screenplay	Myint Oo Oo Myint	Gyo-Gyar Taung-Ban Khat Than (The Sound of Flutter of Crane Bird)
Best Actor	Nay Toe	Moe Nya Einmet Myu
Best Supporting Actress	Soe Pyae Thazin	Moe Nya Einmet Myu
Best Cinematography	Ko Ko Htay Group	A-Teit Yae A-Yake (Shadow of The Past)
Best Music	Diramore	Zaw Ka Ka Nay The (Dancing Zawgyi Dance)
Best Sound	San Oo Group	A-Teit Yae A-Yake (Shadow of The Past)
Best Editing	Zaw Min (Han Thar Myay)	Kyauk Sat Yay

== 2010 Academy Awards ==
The Myanmar Motion Picture Academy Awards presentation ceremony for 2010 was held on 7 February 2012 in Naypyidaw.

Award	Winner	Film
Best Picture	Ar-Dan-Yal-Aye-Wa-Yal-Da-Tha-Yal (Adam, Eve and Datsa)	Heart and Soul Films
Best Director	Khin Maung Oo + Soe Thein Htut	Pin-Lal-Htet-Ka Nay-Won-Ni (The Red Sun at Above of Sea)
Best Screenplay	Khin Maung Oo + Soe Thein Htut	Pin-Lal-Htet-Ka Nay-Won-Ni (The Red Sun at Above of Sea)
Best Actor	Pyay Ti Oo	Ar-Dan-Yal-Aye-Wa-Yal-Da-Tha-Yal (Adam, Eve and Datsa)
Best Actress	Thet Mon Myint	Ar-Dan-Yal-Aye-Wa-Yal-Da-Tha-Yal (Adam, Eve and Datsa)
Best Supporting Actor	Wai Lu Kyaw	Pin-Lal-Htet-Ka Nay-Won-Ni (The Red Sun at Above of Sea)
Best Supporting Actress	Wah Wah Aung	A-May-Kyay-Zu Sat-Phu-Chin-Tal
Best Cinematography	Pan Gyi Soe Moe	Pin-Lal-Htet-Ka Nay-Won-Ni (The Red Sun at Above of Sea)
Best Music	Myanmar-Pyi Kyauk Seinn	A-Ngo-Myet-Lone A-Pyone-Myet-Hnar (Crying Eyes, Smiling Face)
Best Sound	(none awarded)	-
Best Editing	U Myint Khaing	Pin-Lal-Htet-Ka Nay-Won-Ni (The Red Sun at Above of Sea)

== 2011 Academy Awards ==
The Myanmar Motion Picture Academy Awards presentation ceremony for 2011 was held on 30 December 2012 in Yangon, after four years in the new capital Naypyidaw. The awards were selected out of 15 films screened in 2011. 8 of the top awards went to a single movie, Htar WaYa A Linn Tan Myar (Eternal Rays of Light).

Award	Winner	Film
Best Picture	HtarWaYa A Linn Tan Myar (Eternal Rays of Light)	Yi Myint Films
Best Director	Htun Aung Zaw	HtarWaYa A Linn Tan Myar (Eternal Rays of Light)
Best Screenplay	Myint Saung and Soe Kyaw San	HtarWaYa A Linn Tan Myar (Eternal Rays of Light)
Best Actor	Naung Naung	HtarWaYa A Linn Tan Myar (Eternal Rays of Light)
Best Actress	Melody	HtarWaYa A Linn Tan Myar (Eternal Rays of Light)
Best Supporting Actor	Mos	HtarWaYa A Linn Tan Myar (Eternal Rays of Light)
Best Supporting Actress	Chit Snow Oo	Yin Kwae Nar
Best Cinematography	Tin San	Pann Kyar Wut Hmone
Best Music	Zaw Myo Htut	HtarWaYa A Linn Tan Myar (Eternal Rays of Light)
Best Sound	San Oo	Pann Kyar Wutt Hmone
Best Editing	Hein Htet (Lewe)	HtarWaYa A Linn Tan Myar (Eternal Rays of Light)

== 2012 Academy Awards ==
The Myanmar Motion Picture Academy Awards presentation ceremony for 2012 was held on 29 December 2013 in Yangon.

Award	Winner	Film
Best Picture	(none awarded)	-
Best Director	Ko Zaw (Ar Yon Oo)	Ooh (Egg)
Best Screenplay	(none awarded)	-
Best Actor	Pyay Ti Oo	Let Pan (The Red Cotton Silk Flower)
Best Actress	Phway Phway	Let Pan (The Red Cotton Silk Flower)
Best Supporting Actress	Chaw Yadanar	Ooh (Egg)
Best Cinematography	Aung Ko Lat	Kayan A-Lha (Kayan Beauties)
Best Music	Win Ko	A-Mway-Khan-Htaik-Thu-Phyit-Par-Say (Try to be Deserve Inheritance)
Best Sound	Tony (Lin)	Kayan A-Lha (Kayan Beauties)
Best Editing	Zaw Min (Han Thar Myay)	Ooh (Egg)
Best Child Actress (Special Academy Award)	Yoon Yoon	Tein-Min-Tha-Mie-Yè-Dan-Tar-Yi (Legend of Cloud Princess)

== 2013 Academy Awards ==
The Myanmar Motion Picture Academy Awards presentation ceremony for 2013 was held on 27 December 2014 in Yangon.

Award	Winner	Film
Best Picture	(none awarded)	-
Best Director	Wyne	Satan's Dancer
Best Screenplay	(none awarded)	-
Best Actor	Pyay Ti Oo	As U Like
Best Actress	Wut Hmone Shwe Yi	As U Like
Best Supporting Actor	Min Oo	As U Like
Best Supporting Actress	Khine Thin Kyi	Sone-Pyuu (Black Sheep)
Best Cinematography	(none awarded)	-
Best Music	Piano Tin Win Hlaing	Kyal-Sin Maw-Kun (Epic of Stars)
Best Sound	(none awarded)	-
Best Editing	(none awarded)	-

== 2014 Academy Awards ==
The Myanmar Motion Picture Academy Awards presentation ceremony for 2014 and 2015 was held on 3 April 2016 in Yangon, Myanmar Event Park. Kaung Kyoe Ko Hnite Ti Say Min won five golden angel trophy for Best Film, Best Screenplay, Best Actress, Best Music and Best Editing.

Award	Winner	Film
Best Picture	Kaung Kyoe Ko Hnite Ti Say Min (Keep Good Benefits at Your Body)	Myint Mo Films
Best Director	(none awarded)	-
Best Screenplay	Zaw Myint Oo	Kaung Kyoe Ko Hnite Ti Say Min (Keep Good Benefits at Your Body)
Best Actor	Pyay Ti Oo	HnaLonThar Phyint Pyuu-Lote Thi (Made in Heart)
Best Actress	Khine Thin Kyi	Kaung Kyoe Ko Hnite Ti Say Min (Keep Good Benefits at Your Body)
Best Supporting Actor	Zin Wine	HnaLonThar Phyint Pyuu-Lote Thi (Made in Heart)
Best Supporting Actress	Wut Hmone Shwe Yi	HnaLonThar Phyint Pyuu-Lote Thi (Made in Heart)
Best Cinematography	Toe Win Pyi Soe	Aa-Sone Mae A-Chit (Endless Love)
Best Music	Khin Maung Gyi	Kaung Kyoe Ko Hnite Ti Say Min (Keep Good Benefits at Your Body)
Best Sound	Kyi Min Thein	Mar Yar Project (Artifice Project)
Best Editing	Thaw Zin	Kaung Kyoe Ko Hnite Ti Say Min(Keep Good Benefits at Your Body)

== 2015 Academy Awards ==
Award	Winner	Film
Best Picture	(none awarded)	-
Best Director	Wyne (Own Creator)	Kya Ma Ka Hnin Si Par Maung (I'm Rose, Darling)
Best Screenplay	(none awarded)	-
Best Actor	Nay Toe	Nat Khat Mhar Tae Tite Pwal (Wrong Stars Battle)
Best Actress	Phway Phway	Kya Ma Ka Hnin Si Par Maung (I'm Rose, Darling)
Best Supporting Actor	Bay Lu Wa	Eie-Aa-Yar-Ko Aa-Chit-Hu Hkaw-Tha-Lar (Do You Call Love to This Thing?)
Best Supporting Actress	Tekkatho Goun Pone	Eie-Aa-Yar-Ko Aa-Chit-Hu Hkaw-Tha-Lar (Do You Call Love to This Thing?)
Best Cinematography	Zaw Myint	Kyuu-Pyit Yae Kyay-Kyun Myar (Slaves of Cupid)
Best Music	Hla San Oo	Maung Eain Thu (My Wife)
Best Sound	(none awarded)	-
Best Editing	Zaw Min (Han Thar Myay)	Chit San Eain 2028 (The Love House 2028)

== 2016 Academy Awards ==
The Myanmar Motion Picture Academy Awards for 2016 was held on 18 March 2017 at People's Square and Park, Yangon. This ceremony is distinct for the beautiful stage background with Shwedagon Pagoda. For the pre-celebration of 100-year Anniversary of Myanmar Motion Picture, decorated with 100 statutes of Academy awards. The VP and the Information Minister attended as VVIP Guest. Oak-Kyer-Myat-Pouk won three golden angel trophy for Best Film, Best Director and Best Actor.

Award	Winner	Film
Best Picture	Oak Kyar Myet Pauk	Shwe Sin Oo Film Production
Best Director	Nyunt Myanmar Nyi Nyi Aung	Oak Kyar Myet Pauk
Best Screenplay	(none awarded)	-
Best Actor	Tun Tun (Examplez)	Oak Kyar Myet Pauk
Best Actress	Thet Mon Myint	My Lovely Hate
Best Supporting Actor	Lu Min	Professor Doctor Sait Phwar Hnint Myaing-Yar-Zar TarTay (Prof. Dr. Sait Phwar and Myaing Yar-Zar TarTay)
Best Cinematography	Maung Myint, Aye Min and Aa Ngel Lay	Luu Yadanar Treasure (Luu Treasure Trove)
Best Music	Diramore	Luu Yadanar Treasure (Luu Treasure Trove)
Best Sound	Kyi Min Thein	Hmaw Kyauk Sar (Magic Stone Inscription)
Best Editing	Nyan Wint	Eden Yae Nat-Tha-Mee (Angel of Eden)
Special Academy Award (Film)	Ma-Naw-Myay Hma Kyauk-Sein Ka-Bar (Jade World from Ma-Naw Land)	Moe Myanmar Media

== 2017 Academy Awards ==
The Myanmar Motion Picture Academy Awards for 2017 was held on 23 March 2018 at Myanmar Event Park, Yangon.

Award	Winner	Film
Lifetime Achievement Award (Everlasting Outstanding Honorary Award)	Bogalay Tint Aung	
Best Picture	Minglar Zaw Production	Nay Chi Hmar Shwe Yi Laung
Best Director	Zin Yaw Maung Maung	Eternal Mother
Best Screenplay	Wyne (Own Creator)	Yin Bat Htae Ka Dar
Best Actor	Nay Toe	Tar Tay Gyi
Best Actress	Eaindra Kyaw Zin	Yin Bat Htae Ka Dar
Best Supporting Actor	Myint Myat	Kyun
Best Supporting Actress	Paing Phyo Thu	3Girls
Best Cinematography	Kyauk Phyu & Nay Win	3Girls
Best Music	Piano Tin Win Hlaing	40 Days at Kunlong
Best Sound	Thein Aung	Eternal Mother
Best Editing	Owin	Eternal Mother

== 2018 Academy Awards ==
The Myanmar Motion Picture Academy Awards for 2018 was held on 23 March 2019 at The One Entertainment Park, Yangon.

Award	Winner	Film	Nominees (not include winner)
Lifetime Achievement Award (Everlasting Outstanding Honorary Award)	Sithu Daw Myint Myint Khin (Five-Time Academy Awards Winner)		
Best Picture	Shwe Kyar	Ngwe Thaw-Dar Productions	Ooh-Par-Dan (Obsession) from ZayYarShwePyi Productions; Mudras Calling from Central Base Productions; Clinging with Hate from 7th Sense Productions
Best Director	Aww Yatha	Clinging with Hate	Bann Gyi for Ooh-Par-Dan (Obsession); Wyne for Shwe Kyar; Christina Kyi for Mudras Calling
Best Screenplay	Wyne	Shwe Kyar	Mg Aung (Physics) for Ooh-Par-Dan (Obsession); Lwin Min Ant for Clinging with Hate; Christina Kyi for Mudras Calling
Best Actor	Thu Htoo San	Hmaw-Win Tha-Man-Kyer (The Weretiger)	Zenn Kyi for Deception: Oo Pel Dan Myin; Nay Toe for Clinging with Hate; A Linn Yaung for Thadoh-Tha-Mee (The Bride)
Best Actress	Phway Phway	Shwe Kyar	Paing Phyo Thu for Mi; Khun Sint Nay Chi for Hmaw-Win Tha-Man-Kyer (The Weretiger); Wutt Hmone Shwe Yi for Yan Thu
Best Supporting Actor	Kyaw Kyaw Bo	Clinging with Hate	Htoo Khant Kyaw for Pyidaungsu Thit-Sar; Moe Zat for Pyidaungsu Thit-Sar; A-Yine for ThaMaDaGyi Htan Pay-Sar (A Letter to the President)
Best Supporting Actress	Aye Myat Thu	Naung Twin Ooh-Dan Toon Say Thadee	Aye Wutyi Thaung for Clinging with Hate; Chue Lay for Moe Pann Pwint Yae Thin-Kay-Ta (The Sign of Moe Pann Pwint); San San Win for ThaMaDaGyi Htan Pay-Sar (A Letter to the President)
Best Cinematography	Win Lwin Htet	Clinging with Hate	Kyauk Phyu (Padaythar) for Thadoh-Tha-Mee (The Bride); Na Gyi for Mi; Tun Tun and Arkar for La-Yaung Phyar Tae Innlay Mhar (At Innlay when Moon is Shining)
Best Music	Shalon-M-Rawnan	Myat-Hnar-Pyin-Myer (Dimensions)	Myint Than Tun for Mi; Diramore for Ooh-Par-Dan (Obsession); Sein Mutter and Naung Naung for Naung Twin Ooh-Dan Toon Say Thadee
Best Sound	Ko Aye	Clinging with Hate	
Best Editing	Kyaw Khaing Soe	Shwe Kyar	Soe Htut + Arkar Kyaw for Clinging with Hate; Banyar Aung + Sithu Aung for Pyidaungsu Thit-Sar; Aung Aung Myo for Kyat Gu

== 2019 Academy Awards ==
The Myanmar Motion Picture Academy Awards for 2019, 2020 and 2022 was held on 6 May 2023 at City Hall, Lahar Pyin Theater, Nay Pyi Taw.

Award	Nominees	Winning Film	Winner
Best Cinematography	Arkar Toe (Dan Dar Yee Moe); Kyauk Phyu (Padaythar) (Palpitation in the Breeze); Maung Maung Thar Myint (Now and Ever); Zaw Myint (The Milk Ogre)	Dan Dar Yee Moe	Arkar Toe
Best Music	Myanmar Pyi Kyauk Sein (Kyaw Mhar Galone Yin Mhar Nagar); Zenn Kyi (Now and Ever); Kyaw Kyaw Htun (The Milk Ogre); Kyaw Kyaw Htun (Thitsar Nandaw)	The Milk Ogre	Kyaw Kyaw Htun
Best Sound	Kyi Min Thein (1014); Kyi Min Thein (Chi); U Swe and Nay Shine (The Dark Cinema; (The Milk Ogre)	1014	Kyi Min Thein
Best Editing	G3, Kyaw Khine Soe (1014); Thandar Ko Ko (Dan Dar Yee Moe); Naing Swe (Responsible Citizen); Swe Swe Htun (Stranger's House)	1014	G3, Kyaw Khine Soe
Best Screenplay	Maung Myat Swe (Responsible Citizen); Moe Ni Lwin (Dan Dar Yee Moe); Nyein Min (The Milk Ogre); Thet Oo Maung, Myo Naing (Yoma Paw Kya Tae Myet Yay)	(Responsible Citizen)	Maung Myat Swe
Fashion Award	—N/a	—N/a	Yan Aung, Soe Myat Thuzar, Aung Ye Lin, Moe Hay Ko
Best Supporting Actress	Khin Wint Wah (Palpitation in the Breeze); Myat Mon (The Milk Ogre); San San Win (The Milk Ogre); Shwe Thamee (Chi)	Palpitation in the Breeze	Khin Wint Wah
Best Supporting Actor	Htun Ko Ko (1014); Shwe Htoo (Dan Dar Yee Moe); Htun Htun (Kyar Tot The Lal Maung Sakar); Zin Wine (Responsible Citizen)	Dan Dar Yee Moe	Shwe Htoo
Best Actress	Eaindra Kyaw Zin (Hit Tine); Wutt Hmone Shwe Yee (The Only Mom); Phway Phway (Kyar Tot The Lal Maung Sakar); Thet Mon Myint (Chi)	Hit Tine	Eaindra Kyaw Zin
Best Actor	Sai Sai Kham Leng (Kyr Tot The Lal Maung Sakar); Nay Toe (Chi); Lu Min (Nyit Toon); Myint Myat (Yoma Paw Kya Tae Myet Yay)	Yoma Paw Kya Tae Myet Yay	Myint Myat

== 2020 Academy Awards ==
The Myanmar Motion Picture Academy Awards for 2019, 2020 and 2022 was held on 6 May 2023 at City Hall, Lahar Pyin Theater, Nay Pyi Taw

Award	Nominees	Winning Film	Winner
Best Cinematography	Aung Ko Latt (Gandaba: Strings of a Broken Harp); Pan Chi Soe Moe (Kan Ma Pha La); Ko Toe Win (Myet Nu); Phyo Kyaw (Padauk Musical)	Padauk Musical	Phyo Kyaw
Best Music	Padauk Musical; Aung Ko Latt (Gandaba: Strings of a Broken Harp); Golden Princess; Ko Paw	Gandaba: Strings of a Broken Harp	Aung Ko Latt
Best Film	Padauk Musical; Kan Ma Pha La; Gandaba: Strings of a Broken Harp; Thaung Tike Ka Kyar Say Thar	Padauk Musical	Frenzo Production
Special Award (Best Fashion)	_	Kan Ma Pha La	Htay Htay Tin Group
Best Director	Mee Pwar (Padauk Musical); Aung Ko Latt (Gandaba: Strings of a Broken Harp); Pan Chi Soe Moe (Kan Ma Pha La); Aung Chan Lu (3A)	Padauk Musical	Mee Pwar
Best Supporting Actress	Soe Myat Thuzar (3A); Aye Myat Thu (Kan Ma Pha La); Khin Soe Paing (Ko Paw); May Thinzar Oo (Golden Princess)	Golden Princess	May Thinzar Oo
Best Supporting Actor	Htoo Char (3A); Sin Ma (Ko Paw); Zin Myo (Golden Princess); Ohn Thee (Thaung Tike Ka Kyar Say Thar)	Thaung Tike Ka Kyar Say Thar	Ohn Thee
Best Actress	Nan Su Oo (3A); Wutt Hmone Shwe Yi (Myet Nu); Poe Mamhe Thar (Padauk Musical); Soe Pyae Thazin (Golden Princess)	Golden Princess	Soe Pyae Thazin
Best Actor	Pyay Ti Oo (Kan Ma Pha La); Nay Toe (Myet Nu); Sai Sai Kham Leng (Padauk Musical); Kyaw Kyaw Bo (Golden Princess)	Padauk Musical	Sai Sai Kham Leng

== 2022 Academy Awards ==
The Myanmar Motion Picture Academy Awards for 2019, 2020 and 2022 was held on 6 May 2023 at City Hall, Lahar Pyin Theater, Nay Pyi Taw by Myanmar junta.

Award	Nominees	Winning Film	Winner
Best Editing	Cho Wutt Yi (Pone Yake); Kyi Thar (The Butterfly Trap); Nyi Nyi (Way Ma Nay Chin Bu); Za, A Yoe (Yee Zar Yway Nee)	The Butterfly Trap	Kyi Thar
Best Film	The Butterfly Trap; Yee Zar Yway Nee; Way Ma Nay Chin Bu	Way Ma Nay Chin Bu	Triple Six Film Production
Best Actress	Soe Pyae Thazin (Kyay Nyi Naung); Shwe Hmone Yati (Way Ma Nay Chin Bu); Phway Phway (Yee Zar Yway Nee)	Way Ma Nay Chin Bu	Shwe Hmone Yati
Best Actor	Pyay Ti Oo (The Butterfly Trap); Lu Min (Way Ma Nay Chin Bu); Myint Myat (Yee Zar Yway Nee)	The Butterfly Trap	Pyay Ti Oo

== 2023 Academy Awards ==
The Myanmar Motion Picture Academy Awards for 2023 was held on 3 February 2024 at Myanmar International Convention Center MICC1 in Naypyidaw.

Award	Nominees	Winning Film	Winner(s)
Lifetime Achievement Award (Everlasting Outstanding Honorary Award)	—N/a	—N/a	Aung Myint Myat; Nwet Nwet San; Pan Gyi Soe Moe
Best Cinematography	Tint San (The Teacher); Htar Kyaw (Ko Pwar); Thiha Thit (Fourth Capillary); Win Lwin Htet (Kan Kaung)	Kan Kaung	Win Lwin Htet
Best Music	Kaung Sett Paing (Gita Myo) (Kan Kaung); Banyar Ye Yint (A Red Blanket); Moe Moe (Fourth Capillary); Lin Let (Ko Pwar)	Kan Kaung	Kaung Sett Paing (Gita Myo)
Best Screenplay	Moe Ni Lwin (Kan Kaung); Nyo Min Lwin (The Teacher); Di Di Htet Aung (The Right to Hate); Lu Nay (Fourth Capillary)	The Teacher	Nyo Min Lwin
Best Film	A Red Blanket; Kan Kaung; Fourth Capillary; The Alphabet I Hate	Kan Kaung	Kattiya Film Production
Best Director	Win Lwin Htet (Kan Kaung); Tin Aung Soe (Pan Myo Taw) (A Red Blanket); Nay Hein (Overdue Rain); Nyunt Myanmar Nyi Nyi Aung (The Alphabet I Hate)	A Red Blanket	Tin Aung Soe (Pan Myo Taw)
Best Supporting Actress	May Myint Mo (The Right to Hate); Htun Eaindra Bo (Ko Pwar); Khin Wint Wah (The Alphabet I Hate); Khin Zarchi Kyaw (Kan Kaung)	The Right to Hate	May Myint Mo
Best Supporting Actor	Tayza Lin Young (Morality); Nyi Jaw (Kan Kaung); Nay Win (Intended Rain); Kyaw Zaw Hein (A Red Blanket)	Intended Rain	Nay Win
Best Actress	Nan Su Oo (Meaningful Star); Soe Myat Thuzar (Never Give Up); Thet Mon Myint (Fourth Capillary); Khin Wint Wah (The Right to Hate)	Never Give Up	Soe Myat Thuzar
Best Actor	Paing Takhon (Kan Kaung); Yan Aung (A Red Blanket); Aung Ye Lin (The Alphabet I Hate); Kyaw Ye Aung (Intended Rain)	A Red Blanket	Yan Aung

== 2024 Academy Awards ==
The Myanmar Motion Picture Academy Awards for 2024 was held on 9 February 2025 at Myanmar International Convention Center MICC1 in Naypyidaw.

Award	Nominees	Winning Film	Winner(s)
Lifetime Achievement Award (Everlasting Outstanding Honorary Award)	—N/a	—N/a	Hnin Moe; Kyi Soe; Wah Wah Win Shwe; Khin Than Nu
Best Cinematography	Phoe Si (Sate Ka Kyo); Kaung Zan (Chit Thu Thar Pann Ta Pwint Phyit Khae Yin); Phyo Kyaw (Hnaung); Thiha Thit (Eainmet Kar Yan)	Chit Thu Thar Pann Ta Pwint Phyit Khae Yin	Kaung Zan
Best Music	Kaung Sett Paing (Chit Thu Thar Pann Ta Pwint Phyit Khae Yin); Paw Shan (Yauk Kyar Kaung A Taung Hna Sal); Diramore (Eainmet Kar Yan); W Aung Li (Mi Tin Sein)	Eainmet Kar Yan	Diramore
Best Sound	Kyi Min Thein & Group (Eainmet Kar Yan); Aung Myo Myat / Ye Win (Mee); Htet Myat / Yangon Sound Guy (Mi Tin Sein); Ko Aye / Scorpio Music (A Yett Sett Sone A Nan)	Mee	Aung Myo Myat / Ye Win
Best Editing	Thandar Ko Ko (Eainmet Kar Yan); Arkar Kyaw (Hnaung); Kyaw Khine Soe (Mi Tin Sein); Tin Htun Aung (Chit Thu Thar Pann Ta Pwint Phyit Khae Yin)	Hnaung	Arkar Kyaw
Best Screenplay	Moe Ni Lwin (Eainmet Kar Yan); Wyne (Ta Khote Ta Ya); Nay Naw (Chit Thu Thar Pann Ta Pwint Phyit Khae Yin); Aye Thiri Ko (Tain Pan Chi)	Tain Pan Chi	Aye Thiri Ko
Best Film	A Soe Ma Ya Ananda; Myittar; Chit Thu Thar Pann Ta Pwint Phyit Khae Yin; Yauk Kyar Kaung A Taung Hna Sal	Chit Thu Thar Pann Ta Pwint Phyit Khae Yin	Taurus V Production
Special Award	Sa O Pha Lar (A Soe Ma Ya Ananda); Lone Lone (Lin Kar Di Pa) (Hnaung); Than Swe / S S Myo Kyaw (Eainmet Kar Yan); Aye Kay Htut Hlaing (Chit Thu Thar Pann Ta Pwint Phyit Khae Yin)	Hnaung	Lone Lone (Lin Kar Di Pa)
Fashion Awards	—N/a	—N/a	Yan Aung; Soe Moe Kyi; Htet Aung Shine; Nan Su Yati Soe
Best Director	Aww Ratha (Sate Ka Kyo); Kaung Zan (Chit Thu Thar Pann Ta Pwint Phyit Khae Yin); Ar Yone Oo Pwint Theingi Zaw (Tain Pan Chi); Win Lwin Htet (Eainmet Kar Yan)	Eainmet Kar Yan	Win Lwin Htet
Best Supporting Actress	Khine Hnin Wai (Mi Tin Sein); Htet Htet Htun (Ta Khote Ta Ya); Chue Lay (Bodaw Kin); Naw Phaw Eh Htar (Hnaung)	Bodaw Kin	Chue Lay
Best Supporting Actor	Aye Chan Maung (Mee); Min Oo (Chit Thu Thar Pann Ta Pwint Phyit Khae Yin); Hlwan Paing (Eainmet Kar Yan); Tyron Bejay (A Yett Sett Sone A Nan)	Mee	Aye Chan Maung
Best Actress	May Mi Ko Ko (Tabin Thal Mya Hnin Si); Wutt Hmone Shwe Yi (Tain Pan Chi); Moe Hay Ko (Ta Khote Ta Ya); Poe Mamhe Thar (Hnaung)	Tain Pan Chi	Wutt Hmone Shwe Yi
Best Actor	A Linn Yaung (Mi Tin Sein); Myint Myat (No Hta Min); Sai Sai Kham Leng (Sate Ka Kyo); Nay Toe (Hnaung)	Hnaung	Nay Toe

== 2025 Academy Awards ==
The Myanmar Motion Picture Academy Awards for 2025 was held on 7 February 2026 at Myanmar International Convention Center MICC1 in Naypyidaw.

Award	Nominees	Winning Film	Winner(s)
Lifetime Achievement Award (Everlasting Outstanding Honorary Award)	—N/a	—N/a	U Htay Aung; Khin Lay Swe; Kyi Soe Htun
Best Cinematography	PK (Myit Let Thet Pay Mae Yay See Ka Kyan Tal); Thiha Thit (Nat Win The); Thar Kyaw; Arkar Toe (Nya Mingalar)	Hnin Pwint Say Yar	Thar Kyaw
Best Music	Kaung Sett Paing (Gita Myo) (Nat Win The); Mandalay Bo Naing (Byaw Than); Moe Moe (Pyin Sa Let Moe); Han Htoo Zin	Myit Let Thet Pay Mae Yay See Ka Kyan Tal	Han Htoo Zin
Best Sound	Kyaw Zay Yar Aung (Kant Kaw Ni); Ko Joe; Si Thu/Nyi Phyu (Nya Mingalar); Shine/Thar Pauk (Scorpio) (Byaw Than)	Nat Win The	Ko Joe
Best Editing	Khun; Thandar Ko Ko (or) Don Don (Nat Win The); Hein Htet (Lewe) (Thu Daw Tha Say); Aung Myo Oo (Nya Mingalar)	Myo Pya Htae Ka Lan Ma	Khun
Best Screenplay	Nyein Min (Myittar Amway Bagan Myay); Moe Ni Lwin (Kant Kaw Ni); Lwin Min Eant (Nat Win The); The Land	Maung Mi Pha Yar	The Land
Best Film	Hnin Pwint Say Yar; Byaw Than; Pan Myaing Lal Ma Oo Yin Mue; Myittar Amway Bagan Myay	Pann Myaing Lal Ma Oo Yin Mue	Hein Production
Fashion Awards	—N/a	—N/a	Nay Toe; May Than Nu; Kaung Myat San; Yadanar Bo
Best Director	Min Oo (A Sate); Wyne (Kant Kaw Ni); Win Lwin Htet (Nat Win The); Aww Ra Tha	Byaw Than	Aww Ra Tha
Best Supporting Actress	Khine Hnin Wai; Soe Moe Kyi (A Hnit); Myo Thandar Htun (Nat Win The); Aye Wutyi Thaung (A Sate)	Maung Mi Pha Yar	Khine Hnin Wai
Best Supporting Actor	Sin Ma (Myay Sar); Zaw Win Naing (Byaw Than); Nay Myo Aung; Phyo Ngwe Soe (Byaw Than)	Myit Let Thet Pay Mae Yay See Ka Kyan Tal	Nay Myo Aung
Best Actress	Khin Wint Wah (Byaw Than); Phway Phway (Kant Kaw Ni); Yadanar Bo; Wutt Hmone Shwe Yi (Nat Win The)	Maung Mi Pha Yar	Yadanar Bo
Best Actor	Nay Toe (Myit Let Thet Pay Mae Yay See Ka Kyan Tal); Nay Win (Byaw Than); Myint Myat; A Linn Yaung (Kant Kaw Ni)	Myay Sar	Myint Myat
