= Ta Pyi Thu Ma Shwe Htar =

1993 Burmese Film

- Film poster
- Burmese: တပြည်သူမရွှေထား
- Directed by: Sin Yaw Mg Mg
- Screenplay by: Maung Wunna
- Based on: Ta Pyi Thu Ma Shwe Htar by Tekkatho Phone Naing
- Starring: Kyaw Thu; May Than Nu
- Cinematography: San Aye
- Edited by: Nyi Nyi Aung
- Music by: Sandayar Hla Htut
- Production company: Sin Yaw Film Production
- Release date: 1993
- Running time: 132 minutes
- Country: Myanmar
- Language: Burmese

Ta Pyi Thu Ma Shwe Htar (Burmese: တပြည်သူမရွှေထား) is a 1994 Burmese drama film, directed by Sin Yaw Mg Mg starring Kyaw Thu and May Than Nu. It was based on the popular novel "Ta Pyi Thu Ma Shwe Htar", written by Tekkatho Phone Naing.

== Cast ==
- Kyaw Thu as Myat Swe
- May Than Nu as Htar
- Aung Pyae as U Chan Thar
- Zin Min as Tin Lay
- Wyne as Khin Maung Win
- Cho Thet Zin as Htar Nge
- Tin Htun as U Tin Latt
- Nwet Nwet San as Daw Khin Lay
- Yan Paing Soe as U Tin Lay
- Kay Thwe Moe as Daw Khin Aye
- May Kyi Thein as May May Gyi
- Min Min as Moe Kya Shwe Ko

== Awards ==
Year	Award	Category	Nominee	Result
1993	Myanmar Motion Picture Academy Awards	Best Picture	Sin Yaw Film Production	Won
1993	Myanmar Motion Picture Academy Awards	Best Director	Sin Yaw Mg Mg	Won
1993	Myanmar Motion Picture Academy Awards	Best Actor	Kyaw Thu	Won
1993	Myanmar Motion Picture Academy Awards	Best Music	Sandayar Hla Htut	Won
