= Never Shall We Be Enslaved =

1997 Burmese Film

- Film poster
- Burmese: သူ့ကျွန်မခံပြီ
- Directed by: Kyi Soe Tun
- Screenplay by: Chit Oo Nyo
- Based on: Never Shall We Be Enslaved by Tekkatho Phone Naing
- Produced by: U Tat Tun Kyaw; Captain Aung Moe Kyaw
- Starring: Nyunt Win; Nay Aung; Kyaw Thu; Kyaw Ye Aung; Lwin Moe; May Than Nu; San Shar Tin; Nandar Hlaing
- Edited by: U Myint Khaing
- Production company: Myat Mi Khin Film Production
- Release date: January 4, 1997
- Running time: 160 minutes
- Country: Myanmar
- Languages: Burmese, English, French

Never Shall We Be Enslaved also known as Thu Kyun Ma Khan Pyi (Burmese: သူ့ကျွန်မခံပြီ), is a 1997 Burmese historical-war drama film, directed by Kyi Soe Tun starring Nyunt Win, Nay Aung, Kyaw Thu, Kyaw Ye Aung, Lwin Moe, May Than Nu, San Shar Tin and Nandar Hlaing.

== Synopsis ==
On May 7, 1885, during a time when Burma was about to fall to the British, within the King's Palace, the Lord of Navy (Nyunt Win) and Bo Kyaw Khaung (Kyaw Ye Aung) were trying to join forces with the French to defend themselves. A group of Bo Thurain (Kyaw Thu) and Bo Min Htin (Lwin Moe), loyal to Prince of Nyaungyan, were trying to defend their own kingdom without relying on anyone. At that time, there was a time of disunity and ethnic division, and the British took advantage of the illegal logging and tried to take over the country. Who would stand up and fight to keep the Burmese state from falling?

== Cast ==
- Nyunt Win as Lord of Navy
- Nay Aung as Sawbwa of Hsenwi State
- Kyaw Thu as Bo Thurain
- Kyaw Ye Aung as Bo Kyaw Khaung
- Lwin Moe as Bo Min Htin
- May Than Nu as Saw Shin Oo
- San Shar Tin as Hsinbyumashin
- Nandar Hlaing as Khin Phone
- Mandalay Thein Zaw as Sawbwa of Mongnai State
- Kyaw Nyein Aye as King Thibaw
- Cho Thin as Queen consort Supayalat
- Aung Kyaw as Chief Minister
- Mos as Doon Oo
- Alexander Babic as General Prendergast
- San Myint as Colonel Sladen

== Awards ==
Year	Award	Category	Nominee	Result
1997	Myanmar Motion Picture Academy Awards	Best Picture	Never Shall We Be Enslaved	Won
1997	Myanmar Motion Picture Academy Awards	Best Director	Kyi Soe Tun	Won
1997	Myanmar Motion Picture Academy Awards	Best Supporting Actor	Nyunt Win	Won
1997	Myanmar Motion Picture Academy Awards	Best Editing	U Myint Khaing	Won
