= Hein Htet =

Hein Htet may refer to:

- Hein Htet (film editor)
- Hein Htet (actor)
