= Sandayar Hla Htut =

Burmese musician

- စန္ဒရားလှထွတ်
- Born: Hla Htut; 1936; Wakema, Irrawaddy Division, British Burma
- Died: January 5, 2000 (aged 63–64); Yangon, Myanmar
- Occupations: Musician; composer; pianist; singer; writer
- Spouse: Cho Wai Lwin
- Children: Zaw Myo Htut
- Parent(s): U San Htoo (father); Daw Mya (mother)
- Awards: Myanmar Motion Picture Academy Awards (Best Music Award for 1994); Myanmar National Literature Award (1995)

Sandayar Hla Htut (Burmese: စန္ဒရားလှထွတ်; 1936–2000) was a Burmese musician, composer, pianist, singer and writer. He won Best Music Award in 1994 Myanmar Motion Picture Academy Awards. He also won Myanmar National Literature Award in 1995.

== Early life and education ==
Hla Htut was born in 1936 on Wakema, Irrawaddy Division, British Burma to parents U San Htoo (Myanmar Htoo) and Daw Mya. He was youngest of seven siblings.

When he was young, after the war, he attended middle school education at Myoma High School, Yangon from 1947 to 1951. He passed his matriculation examination while he was continuing his high school education at Government High School No. 1 from 1951 to 1957. He studied at Yangon University (Yankin College) and Mandalay University until the second year. At that time, he was a successful musician by the name Sandayar Hla Htut in Myanmar radio music world, the world of drama; school, college, university and art world.

== Career ==
In 1960s, while Sandayar Hla Htut was a successful musician, composer and a film music director, on the other hand, he also wrote literary articles and translated short stories. He wrote a number of music articles for music magazines. In collaboration with Harb U Ba Than, he published a book, Music Symbolism. He also published the books Music Symbols and Sandayar Hla Htut Life and Songs. He won Best Music Award in 1994 Myanmar Motion Picture Academy Awards for the film Ta Pyi Thu Ma Shwe Htar.

After that, he wrote a series of 'Myanmar Music Stream' articles on in the magazine, Sanda Comics. He continued wrote articles in the Moe Wai, Mahaythi, Movie soundtrack, Kalyar, Literary Journal, Thoughts, New Smell and Mingalar magazines. Later, in 1995, he published a book, Burmese Music Stream, in 'Nay Yee Yee' publishing house and he was awarded Myanmar National Literature Award in this year.

It is said that "Sandayar Hla Htut is the greatest bond between literature and music." In the world of Burmese literature, he wrote articles alongside other musicians, composers and singers such as Myoma Nyein, Ko Hla Moe, Yan Naing Sein, Bogalay Tint Aung, Sagaing Hla Shwe, Than Hlaing, Maung Maung Latt, Myat Lay, Sandayar Chit Swe.

Sandayar Hla Htut was a prolific scholar of Burmese music and the history of world music. He wrote in his book "This book compares world music history to the present day, comparing of the origins of music, its interpretation of music, its musical aspects, and concepts such as the taste and philosophy of music, and the current state of Burmese music history,". He wrote about events in the world and music, and translated short stories (e.g., The Night We Met with Einstein). He then wrote fragments of his life.

== Death ==
Sandayar Hla Htut died at his home on 5 January 2000 in Yangon. He was 64 years old at the time of his death, and was left by his wife, singer Cho Wai Lwin and son Zaw Myo Htut (Mizzima).
