= Heavy Phyo =

Burmese actor, model and singer

- ဟဲဗွီးဖြိုး
- Born: Heavy Phyo; Myanmar
- Occupations: Actor; singer

Heavy Phyo also Heavy Phyoe (Burmese: ဟဲဗွီးဖြိုး) is a Burmese child actor and singer. He started his career as a child actor when he was two years old. He became well known for advertisements, including Java Coffee and Laser toothpaste.

He was nominated three times for the Myanmar Motion Picture Academy Awards at 2009, 2013 and 2015. He is best known for his performance in the film, Zaw Ka Ka Nay The, Satan's Dancer and I'm Rose, Darling.

== Selected filmography ==
=== Films ===
- Zaw Ka Ka Nay The (ဇော်က ကနေသည်) (2009)
- Satan's Dancer (စေတန်ရဲ့ကချေသည်) (2013)
- I'm Rose, Darling (ကျွန်မကနှင်းဆီပါမောင်) (2015)

=== Television series ===
- Closest to the Heart (နှလုံးသားနှင့်အနီးဆုံး) (2018)

== Awards and nominations ==
Year	Award	Category	Nominated work	Result
2009	Myanmar Academy Award	Special Award	Zaw Ka Ka Nay The	Nominated
2013	Myanmar Academy Award	Special Award	Satan's Dancer	Nominated
2015	Myanmar Academy Award	Special Award	I'm Rose, Darling	Nominated
