= Kyauk Sat Yay =

2009 Burmese film

- poster
- Burmese: ကျောက်စက်ရေ
- Directed by: Wyne
- Screenplay by: Hsu Aww Chal
- Story by: Ja Mann
- Produced by: Ja Mann
- Starring: Myint Myat; Soe Myat Thuzar; May Than Nu; Htun Eaindra Bo; Khin Than Nu
- Cinematography: Kyauk Phyu (Padaythar)
- Edited by: Zaw Min (Hanthar Myay)
- Music by: Myint Moe Aung
- Production company: Mahaw Gahni Film Production
- Distributed by: Mahaw Gahni Film Production
- Release date: 2009
- Running time: 120 minutes
- Country: Myanmar
- Language: Burmese

Kyauk Sat Yay (Burmese: ကျောက်စက်ရေ) is a 2009 Burmese drama film, directed by Wyne starring Myint Myat, Soe Myat Thuzar, May Than Nu, Htun Eaindra Bo and Khin Than Nu. Zaw Min (Hanthar Myay) won the Best Editing Award in 2009 Myanmar Motion Picture Academy Awards for this film.

== Cast ==
=== Main cast ===
- Myint Myat as Myint Myat
- Soe Myat Thuzar as Thuzar San
- May Than Nu as Kalyar Nyein
- Htun Eaindra Bo as Thandar Htwe
- Khin Than Nu as Daw Hla Myaing

=== Guest cast ===
- Yan Aung as Thuzar San's husband
- Ye Aung as Thandar Htwe's husband
- Moe Pyae Pyae Maung as Mar Mar
- Thazin as Thandar Htwe's young life
- Nan Su Yati Soe as Kalyar Nyein's young life
- Melody as Thuzar San's young life
- Sandi Myint Lwin as Kalayar Nyein's daughter

== Award ==
Year	Award	Category	Nominee	Result
2009	Myanmar Motion Picture Academy Awards	Best Editing	Zaw Min (Hanthar Myay)	Won
