= Yadanar =

- Film poster
- Burmese: ရတနာ
- Directed by: Ei Ei Khaing
- Written by: Ei Ei Khaing
- Starring: Kyaw Thu; Pho Thaukkya; Zaganar; Kyaw Kyaw Paing Hmu; Htun Eaindra Bo; May Than Nu; Pearl Win; Wyne Su Khine Thein; Than Than Soe
- Release date: 2006
- Country: Myanmar
- Language: Burmese

Yadanar (Burmese: ရတနာ, pronounced [jədənà]; lit. Jewels) is a 2006 Burmese film directed by Ei Ei Khaing.

== Cast ==
- Kyaw Thu
- Pho Thaukkya
- Zaganar
- Kyaw Kyaw Paing Hmu
- Htun Eaindra Bo
- May Than Nu
- Pearl Win
- Wyne Su Khine Thein
- Than Than Soe
