= Mos (comedian) =

Burmese actor

- မော့စ်
- Born: Tin Win; 13 May 1954; Yay Thoe Chaung Village, Ayeyarwady Region, Myanmar
- Died: February 13, 2013 (aged 58); Yangon
- Occupations: Actor, Comedian

Mos (Burmese: မော့စ်) was a Burmese comedian and actor who became famous in kyuntot Thabin Tin Moe Win Drama with comedian Moe Di. He won the Best Supporting Actor award at the 2011 Myanmar Academy Award for his performance in the film Eternal Rays of Light.

== Awards and nominations ==
Year	Award	Category	Nominated work	Result
2011	Myanmar Academy Award	Best Supporting Actor	Eternal rays of light	Won

== Death ==
Before the 2011 Myanmar Academy Award which was held in 2013, Mos had to be treated at the SSC Hospital every Wednesday due to a liver disease. He died at the SSC Hospital on February 13, 2013, at 4:20 am.
