= Kyaw Win (actor) =

Burmese film actor

Academy Kyaw Win
- ကျော်ဝင်း
- Born: Kyaw Win; 1918; Ywar Thit Gyi, Sagaing Region
- Died: 1993 (aged 74–75)
- Occupation: actor
- Known for: First Myanmar Academy Award winning actor
- Parents: Tint (father); Thant (mother)
- Awards: Myanmar Academy Award 1952

Academy Kyaw Win (Burmese: အကယ်ဒမီကျော်ဝင်း; 1918 — 1993) was the first winner of the Myanmar Academy Award in Burmese Film History. He won the first best actor award in Marlaryi with Kyi Kyi Htay winning best actress for her performance in Chit Thet Wai (Dear Thet Wai).

== Early life and careers ==
Kyaw Win was born in 1918 in Ywa Thit Gyi, Sagaing. His father was U Tint and his mother was Daw Thant.

He made his first acting debut in 1939 in the film Taung Taw Thakin Ma, directed by Sayar Myint. After that, he co-starred with actress Khin Khin Sein in the film Iron Nails directed by Sayar Shwe. He also starred with actress Khin Khin Lay

in director U Aung Zan's Htilate Poe Oo.

During World War II, he stopped filming and entered the industry of Drama.He starred as the lead actor in the play True Soldier, directed by Shwe Don Be Aung. During the play, Bogyoke Aung San and senior Burmese military officers, Major Moe Kyo and senior Japanese military officers visited and cheered. When the Allies returned after the end of the Fascist revolution, Kyaw Win performed a play called Kabarscaitkyimhar Ahmyishi. He last performed the Saw Bayin Khan play and resumed filming. In 1952, the Ministry of Information formed the Myanmar Film Standards Evaluation Committee to promote Myanmar film arts and crafts.

At 1952, Kyaw Win, who starred in the 1951 film Malaryi, won his first Myanmar Academy Award.

== Awards and nominations ==
| Year | Award | Category | Nominated work | Result |
|---|---|---|---|---|
| 1952 | Myanmar Academy Award | Best actor | Marlaryi | Won |
