= Aww Main Ma Main Ma =

1972 Burmese Film

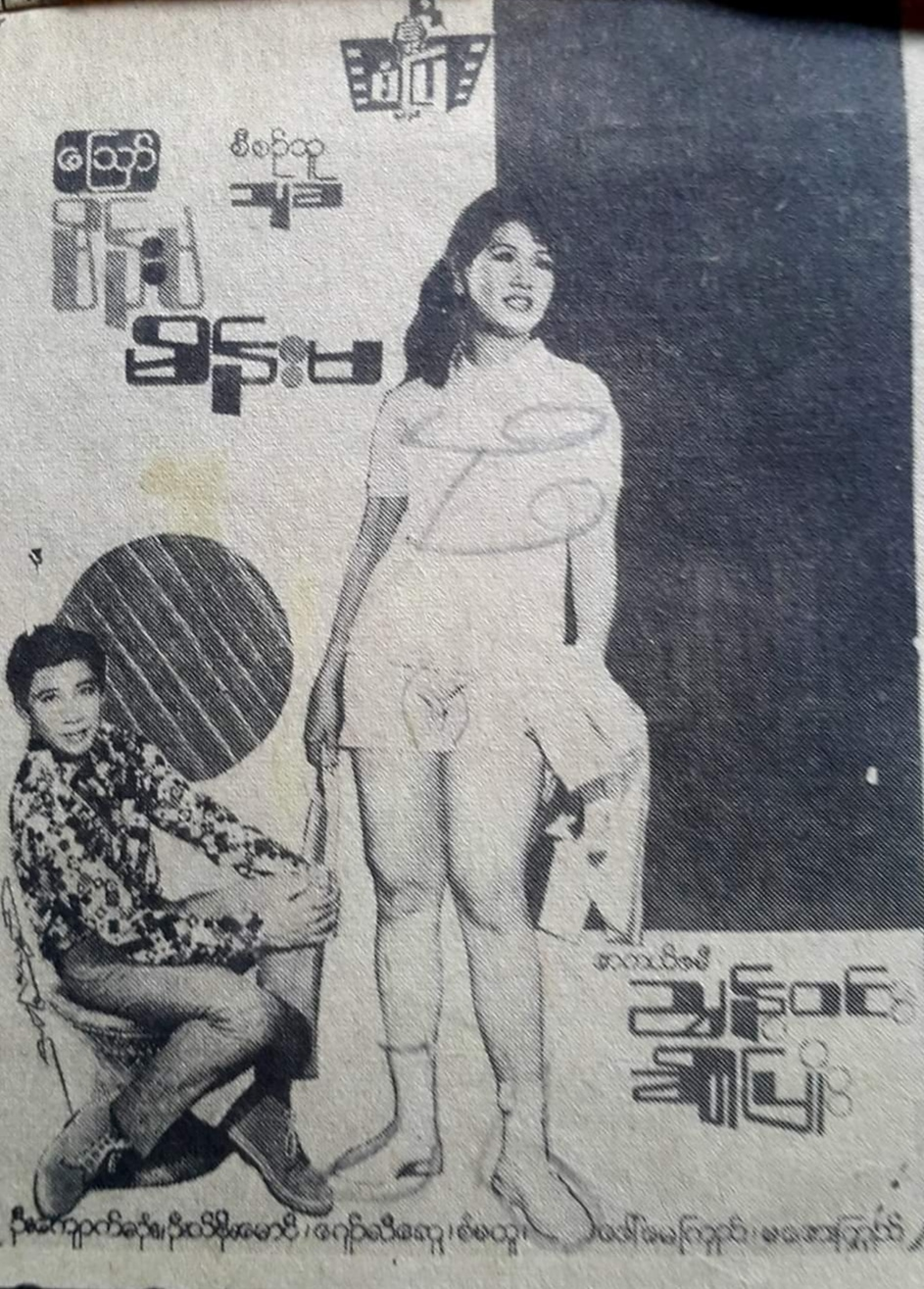
- Film Poster
- Burmese: သြော်မိန်းမမိန်းမ
- Directed by: Thukha
- Starring: Nyunt Win; Cho Pyone; Kyauk Lone; Thein Maung; Jolly Swe
- Cinematography: U Kwon; Khin Thein
- Music by: Maung Ko Ko
- Production company: San Pya Films
- Release date: 1972
- Running time: 142 minutes
- Country: Myanmar
- Language: Burmese

Aww Main Ma Main Ma (Burmese: သြော်မိန်းမမိန်းမ) is a 1972 Burmese black-and-white drama film, directed by Thukha starring Nyunt Win, Cho Pyone, Kyauk Lone, Thein Maung and Jolly Swe.

== Cast ==
- Nyunt Win as Dr. Kyaw Zay Ya
- Cho Pyone as Baby
- Kyauk Lone as Ba Hla Nyunt
- Thein Maung as U Thein Zan
- Jolly Swe as Paw Lar
- San Ma Tu as U Kone Than
