= Hein Htet (film editor) =

Burmese film editor

Hein Htet (Lewe)
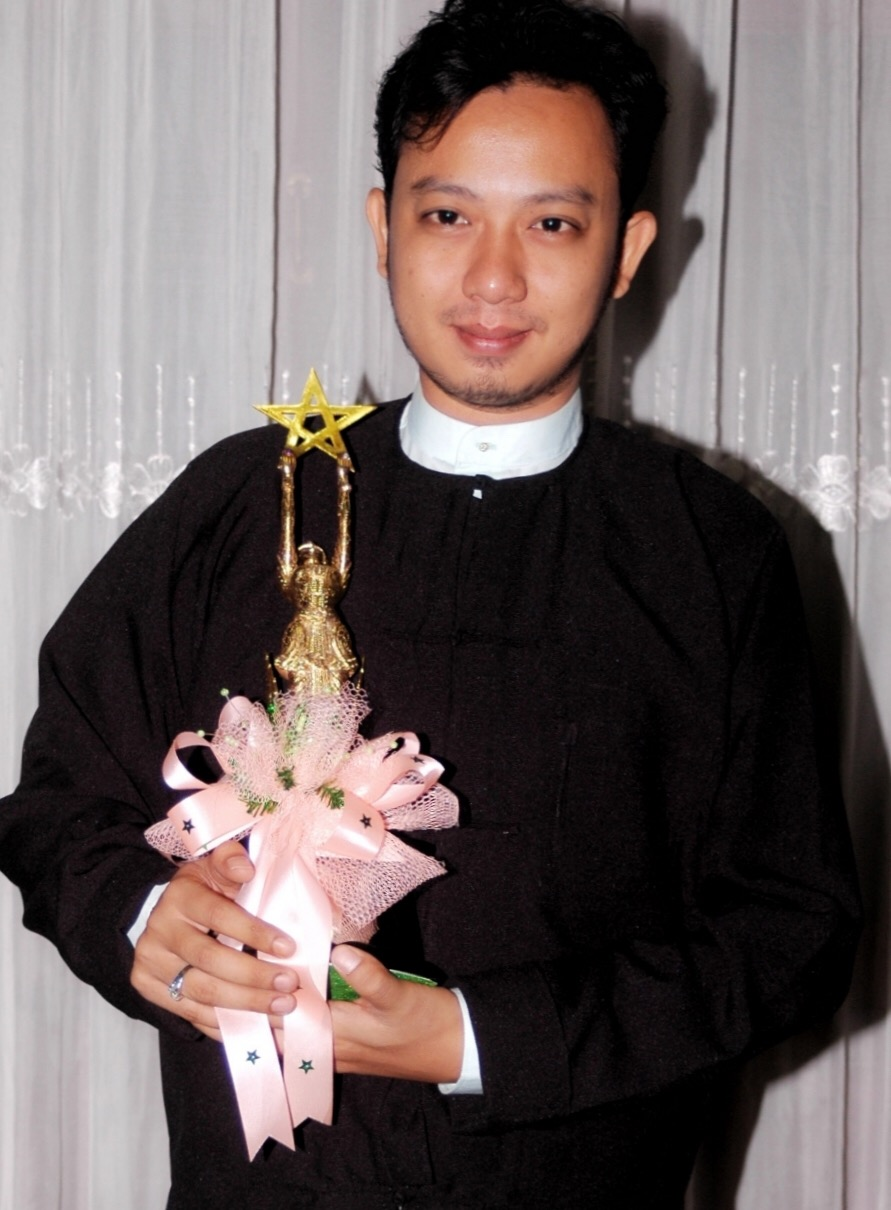
- Academy Hein Htet (Lewe)
- Born: Hein Htet Bo; September 12, 1981 (age 44); Lewe, Burma
- Other name: Ni Htet
- Education: Mandalay University
- Occupation: Film Editor
- Parents: Myint Aung (father); Myint Myint Aye (mother)
- Awards: Myanmar Academy Award for Best Film Editing (2011) with Htar Wara A Linn Tan Myar

Hein Htet (Lewe) (Burmese: ဟိန်းထက် (လယ်ဝေး); born Hein Htet Bo on 12 September 1981) is a Myanmar Academy Award-winning film editor. He won the Best Editing Award at the 2011 Myanmar Academy Awards for his works in the film Htar Wara A Linn Tan Myar (Eternal Rays of Light).

== Early life and education ==
Hein Htet was born on 12 September 1981 in Lewe, Burma to parents Myint Aung and his wife Myint Myint Aye. He is the second son of three siblings, having an elder brother and an younger sister. His childhood name was Ni Htet.

He passed high school from B.E.H.S (1), Lewe in 1998. He got AGIT (EP) and graduated with a B.A. English from Mandalay University.

== Career ==
Hein Htet started his film editing career in 2005. He edited his first film Htar WaYa A Linn Tan Myar (Eternal Rays of Light), directed by Htun Aung Zaw from Yi Myint Film Production in 2011, which he won his Academy Award for the Best Editing.

He edited Htar Warq A Linn Tan Myar (Eternal Rays of Light) with computer (digital) editing. At present, he has edited in over 30 films in his career.

== List of awards and nominations received by Hein Htet ==
Year	Award	Category	Nominated work	Result
2011	Myanmar Motion Picture Academy Awards	Best Editor	Eternal Rays of light	Won
2025	Myanmar Motion Picture Academy Awards	Best Editor	Thudaw Tasay	Nominated
