= Zaw Ka Ka Nay The =

2009 Burmese film

- film poster
- Burmese: ဇော်ကကနေသည်
- Directed by: Mee Pwar
- Screenplay by: A Kyi Taw
- Based on: Zaw Ka Ka Nay The by A Kyi Taw
- Starring: Nay Toe; Nandar Hlaing; Pearl Win; Nyunt Win; Heavy Phyo
- Edited by: Malikha
- Music by: Diramore
- Production company: Nal Thit Oo Film Production
- Release date: 2009
- Running time: 120 minutes
- Country: Myanmar
- Language: Burmese

Zaw Ka Ka Nay The (Burmese: ဇော်ကကနေသည်) is a 2009 Burmese drama film, directed by Mee Pwar starring Nay Toe, Nandar Hlaing, Pearl Win, Nyunt Win and Heavy Phyo. Mee Pwar won the Best Director Award and Diramore won the Best Music Award in 2009 Myanmar Motion Picture Academy Awards for this film.

== Cast ==
- Nay Toe as Zawgyi
- Nandar Hlaing as Myint Zu
- Pearl Win as Ma Lay Nge
- Nyunt Win as U Tin Maung
- Heavy Phyo as Mg Thar Cho
