= Nyunt Win =

Burmese film actor (1941–2021)

- ညွန့်ဝင်း
- Born: 8 March 1941; Thaton, British Burma
- Died: 1 July 2021 (aged 80); Yangon, Myanmar
- Education: University of Cambridge; Oregon State University
- Occupation: Actor
- Spouse: Khin Aye Mu
- Parent: Shwe Man Tin Maung (father) Thein Nyunt (mother)
- Awards: Total 8 Myanmar Motion Picture Academy Awards (Best Leading Actor for 1968, 1971, 1983), (Best Supporting Actor for 1993, 1997, 2002, 2004), (Lifelong Arts Award 2022)

Nyunt Win (Burmese: ညွန့်ဝင်း; 8 March 1941 – 1 July 2021) was a Burmese film actor. He won seven Myanmar Motion Picture Academy Awards throughout his distinguished career, the most of any recipient in Burmese history.

== Early life and education ==
Nyunt Win was born on 8 March 1941 in the village of Zwekala in Thaton, British Burma (now Myanmar) to Thein Nyunt and Shwe Man Tin Maung, a Burmese dancer-actor, as the eldest of seven siblings. His father Tin Maung founded an influential theatrical troupe, theater troupe, Shwe Man Thabin, in 1933.

In his early childhood, Nyunt Win attended Mandalay Boys' School and St. Francis Boys' School (now Basic Education High School No. 5 Tarmwe) in Rangoon. Between the ages of 10 to 20, he attended Darjeeling College in India. He briefly attended the University of Cambridge to pursue a diploma in radio electronics, and Oregon State University to pursue a diploma in stagecraft.

== Career ==
Nyunt Win debuted as an actor in the film Do Thami Alo Shi Thi (သတို့သမီး အလိုရှိသည်), directed by Thein Zaw. Throughout his career, he received 7 Myanmar Motion Picture Academy Awards.

Nyunt Win helped pioneer the revival of cricket in Myanmar, a sport he had played as a child. In 2005 he became the inaugural president of the Myanmar Cricket Federation.

== Death ==
He died on 1 July 2021 and was survived by his wife and three children.

== Filmography ==
- Hsaung (1966)
- Ko Yal Toe Yal Soe Soe Yal (1967)
- Banto Lu Lay Nae Thuzar (1968)
- Apeyadana (1968)
- Chit Thu Waing Waing Lal (1971)
- Aww Main Ma Main Ma (1972)
- Tatiya A Ywal Ei Dutiya Waydanar (1983)
- Thida Khun Hna Tan (1993)
- Never Shall We Be Enslaved (1997)
- Hsan Yay (2002)
- Mystery of Snow (2004)
- Kyan Sit Min (2005)
- Zaw Ka Ka Nay The (2009)
- Htarwara A Linn Tan Myar (2011)

== Awards and nominations ==
Year	Award	Category	Nominated work	Result
1968	Myanmar Motion Picture Academy Awards	Best Actor	Bando Lu-Lay Nae Thuzar	Won
1971	Myanmar Motion Picture Academy Awards	Best Actor	Chit-Thu Waing Waing Lal	Won
1983	Myanmar Motion Picture Academy Awards	Best Actor	Ta-Ti-Ya A-Ywal Ei Duh-Ti-Ya Way-Da-Nar (The Second Heartbreak of the Third Age)	Won
1993	Myanmar Motion Picture Academy Awards	Best Supporting Actor	Thidar Khunnit-Tan	Won
1997	Myanmar Motion Picture Academy Awards	Best Supporting Actor	Thu Kyun Ma-Khan-Bi (Never Shall We Be Enslaved)	Won
2002	Myanmar Motion Picture Academy Awards	Best Supporting Actor	Hsan Yay' (Upstream)	Won
2004	Myanmar Motion Picture Academy Awards	Best Supporting Actor	Hlyo-hwat-thaw-hnin (Mystery of Snow)	Won
