= Ko Yal Toe Yal Soe Soe Yal =

1967 Burmese film

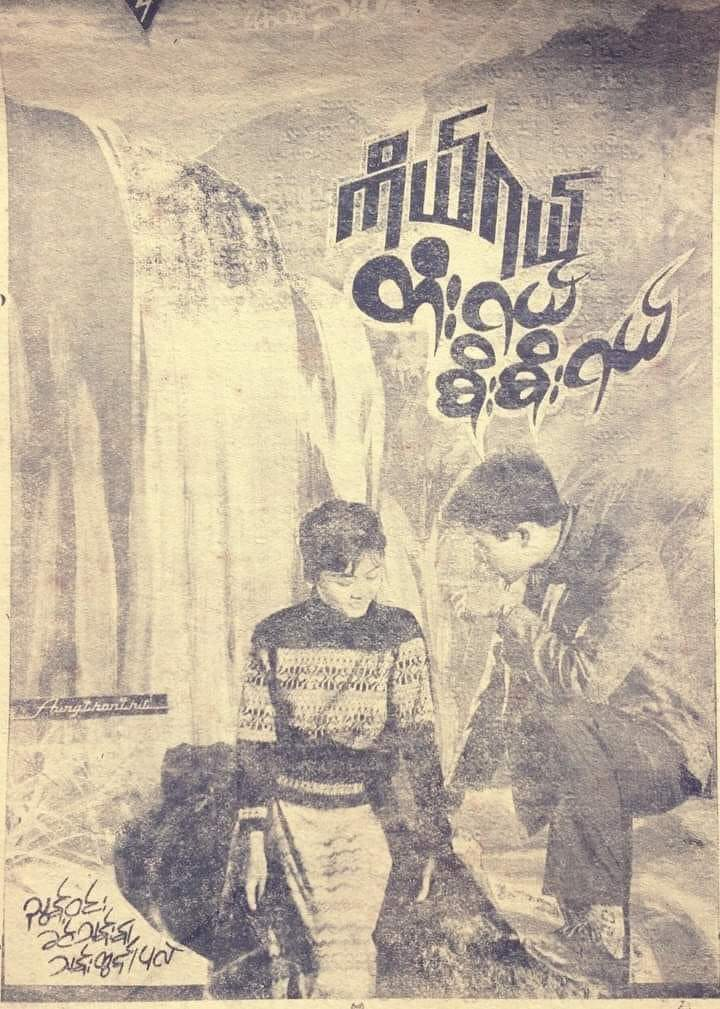
- poster
- Burmese: ကိုယ်ရယ်တိုးရယ်စိုးစိုးရယ်
- Directed by: Tin Maung
- Screenplay by: May May Than
- Story by: Nu Shwe Wah
- Starring: Nyunt Win; Khin Than Nu
- Music by: Maung Ko Ko
- Production company: Lyat Sit Film
- Release date: 1967
- Running time: 110 minutes
- Country: Myanmar
- Language: Burmese

Ko Yal Toe Yal Soe Soe Yal (Burmese: ကိုယ်ရယ်တိုးရယ်စိုးစိုးရယ်) is a 1967 Burmese black-and-white drama film, directed by Tin Maung starring Nyunt Win and Khin Than Nu. The film earned two accolades at the 1967 Myanmar Motion Picture Academy Awards: Best Director for Tin Maung and Best Actress for Khin Than Nu.

== Cast ==
- Nyunt Win as Myat Swe
- Khin Than Nu as Toe Toe
