= Mystery of Snow =

2005 film by Sin Yaw Mg Mg

- Directed by: Sin Yaw Mg Mg
- Written by: Nyein Min
- Starring: Nyunt Win, Lwin Moe, Lu Min, Soe Myat Nandar
- Cinematography: Ko Ko Htay
- Edited by: Zaw Min
- Distributed by: Zin Yaw Film Production
- Release date: April 8, 2005 (Myanmar Film Festival)
- Running time: 135 minutes
- Country: Myanmar

Mystery of Snow (Burmese: လျှို့ဝှက်သောနှင်း; Hlyọ-hwet-thāw-hnīn) is a 2005 Burmese musical adventure drama film directed by Sin Yaw Mg Mg. The film picked up seven Myanmar Academy Awards including Best Film, Best Director, Best Supporting Actor, Best Scriptwriter, Best Cinematography, Best Film Editing and Best Sound

== Cast ==
- Lwin Moe as Okkar
- Nyunt Win as The Guide
- Lu Min as The Guide's Son
- Soe Myat Nandar as The Guide's Daughter

== International release ==
According to director Zin Yaw Maung Maung, he had to work in conjunction with the Ministry of Information to help get the film onto the international circuit. He was quoted as saying “I know it is out of the question to get the money back that was invested in this film [more than US $160,000] if we only show it in Myanmar,” he said. “That is why I decided to distribute it in foreign countries.”
