= May Than Nu =

Burmese film actress

- မေသန်းနု
- Born: Than Than Hsint; 27 January 1961 (age 65); Mergui, Burma (now Myeik, Myanmar)
- Occupation: Actress
- Years active: 1985–present
- Spouse: Sin Yaw Mg Mg (divorced)
- Awards: Myanmar Motion Picture Academy Awards

May Than Nu (Burmese: မေသန်းနု; born 27 January 1961) is a Burmese film actress. She has won 5 Myanmar Academy Awards throughout her career.

== Biography ==
May Than Nu was born Than Than Hsint (သန်းသန်းဆင့်) in Mergui, Tenasserim Division, Burma (now Myeik, Myanmar) on 27 January 1961. She debuted with the film Thingyan Moe, playing the daughter of Khin Than Nu.

== Controversy ==
She was arrested to the court for the misconducted and fraud the money from her close business friend so one year jail penalty by Yankin Court on 2 January 2020, and another being accused like the same case is still facing by the Kamaryut and Thingyangan Court in February 2020.

== Personal life ==
May Than Nu was previously married to Sin Yaw Mg Mg, with whom she has a son, Min Thant Maung Maung, a film director.

== Filmography ==
=== Films ===
- Thingyan Moe (သင်္ကြန်မိုး) (1985)
- Ta Pyi Thu Ma Shwe Htar (တပြည်သူမရွှေထား) (1994)
- Never Shall We Be Enslaved (သူ့ကျွန်မခံပြီ) (1997)
- A May Chay Yar (1997)
- Kyan Sit Min (ကျန်စစ်မင်း) (2005)
- Yadana (ရတနာ) (2006)
- Kyauk Sat Yay (ကျောက်စက်ရေ) (2009)
- Eternal Mother (ထာဝရအမေ) (2017)
- Hit Tine (ဟစ်တိုင်) (2019)

== Awards and nominations ==
Year	Award	Category	Nominated work	Result
1985	Myanmar Academy Award	Best Supporting Actress	Thingyan Moe	Nominated
1991	Myanmar Academy Award	Best Actress	Legend	Nominated
1992	Myanmar Academy Award	Best Actress	Exclusive Sweetheart	Won
1993	Myanmar Academy Award	Best Actress	Artifice Of River	Nominated
1994	Myanmar Academy Award	Best Actress	Ta Pyi Thu Ma Shwe Htar	Nominated
1995	Myanmar Academy Award	Best Actress	Bright Moon at Bagan	Won
1996	Myanmar Academy Award	Best Actress	Pale Light Sky	Won
1997	Myanmar Academy Award	Best Actress	Never Shall We Be Enslaved	Nominated
2001	Myanmar Academy Award	Best Actress	Another Side of Love	Won
2002	Myanmar Academy Award	Best Supporting Actress	Me, Another, Men, Women	Won
2005	Myanmar Academy Award	Best Supporting Actress	Kyan Sit Min	Nominated
2006	Myanmar Academy Award	Best Supporting Actress	Yadana	Nominated
2009	Myanmar Academy Award	Best Supporting Actress	Kyauk Sat Yay	Nominated
2010	Myanmar Academy Award	Best Supporting Actress	Amay Kyay Zu Satt Phu Chin Tal	Nominated
2017	Myanmar Academy Award	Best Actress	Eternal Mother)	Nominated
