= 1014 (film) =

Burmese film

- Film poster
- Burmese: ၁၀၁၄
- Directed by: Kyaw Thu
- Written by: Mal Khaing
- Produced by: Myint Myint Khin May
- Starring: Kyaw Thu; Daung; Htun Ko Ko; Htoo Aung; Moht Moht Myint Aung; May Myint Mo; Yadanar Bo
- Production company: Wa Re Zein Film Production
- Release date: December 19, 2019
- Running time: 120 minutes
- Country: Myanmar
- Language: Burmese

1014 (Burmese: ၁၀၁၄), is a Burmese historical drama film starring Kyaw Thu, Daung, Htun Ko Ko, Htoo Aung, Moht Moht Myint Aung, May Myint Mo, and Yadanar Bo. The film, produced by Wa Re Zein Film Production, premiered in Myanmar on December 19, 2019.

== Cast ==
- Kyaw Thu as Mate Tala
- Daung as Nga Phone Sar
- Htun Ko Ko as Nga Yaut Tin
- Htoo Aung as Phat Hta Rar
- Moht Moht Myint Aung as O Pan Si
- May Myint Mo as O Pan Lal
- Yadanar Bo as O Pone Lal
- Khine Htoo Thar as Shin Thuwala
- Min Thu as Tapar Su
- Nyi Jaw as Thahtay Oo Pazin
- Htoo Thar as A Mat Phon Ma Kyan
- Kaung Myat as Kyaung Phyu Min
- Zin Mi Mi Kyaw as Miphayar Nge
- Zaw Win Naing as Yarthinpa
- Nyi Nyi Min Htet as Nga Sin Pha
