= Dan Dar Yee Moe =

Burmese Film

- Film poster
- Burmese: ဒဏ္ဍာရီမိုး
- Directed by: Win Lwin Htet
- Written by: Moe Ni Lwin
- Produced by: Wai Min Maung
- Starring: Ye Deight; Daung; Shwe Htoo; Wutt Hmone Shwe Yi
- Cinematography: Arkar Toe
- Production company: 7th Sense Film Production
- Release date: July 11, 2019
- Running time: 120 minutes
- Country: Myanmar
- Language: Burmese

Dan Dar Yee Moe (Burmese: ဒဏ္ဍာရီမိုး), is a 2019 Burmese romantic drama film starring Ye Deight, Daung, Shwe Htoo and Wutt Hmone Shwe Yi. The film, produced by 7th Sense Film Production and premiered in Myanmar on July 11, 2019.

== Cast ==
- Ye Deight as Lu Nyo
- Daung as Di Hlaine
- Shwe Htoo as Moe Tain Nyo
- Wutt Hmone Shwe Yi as Moe Hnaung
