= Hit Tine =

Burmese film

- Film poster
- Burmese: ဟစ်တိုင်
- Directed by: Hein Soe
- Screenplay by: Ka Kyo Shin
- Based on: Hit Tine by Shin Ma
- Starring: Eaindra Kyaw Zin; May Than Nu; Pyae Pyae; Mone; Phyo Pa Pa Htoo
- Cinematography: Sai Aung Tun
- Production company: Nandaewei Film Production
- Release date: May 16, 2019
- Running time: 120 minutes
- Country: Myanmar
- Language: Burmese

Hit Tine (Burmese: ဟစ်တိုင်, lit. 'Scream') is a 2019 Burmese drama film starring Eaindra Kyaw Zin, May Than Nu, Pyae Pyae, and Mone. The film, produced by Nandaewei Film Production premiered in Myanmar on May 16, 2019.

== Cast ==
- Eaindra Kyaw Zin as Daung Ni
- Pyae Pyae as Eu Daung Nge
- May Than Nu as Daw Thin Thin Khat
- Mone as Zin Mar Lin
- Phyo Pa Pa Htoo as Thin Ya Nant
