= Myanmar Motion Picture Academy Awards =

Annual cinematic award

Myanmar Motion Picture Academy Awards မြန်မာ့ရုပ်ရှင်ထူးချွန်ဆု
- Current: 2025 Myanmar Academy Awards
- Awarded for: Bests in Film Production Industry
- Location: Naypyitaw
- Country: Myanmar
- Presented by: Myanmar Motion Picture Organisation
- Reward: Golden Angel Trophy seizing Real Golden Star
- First award: Since 1952

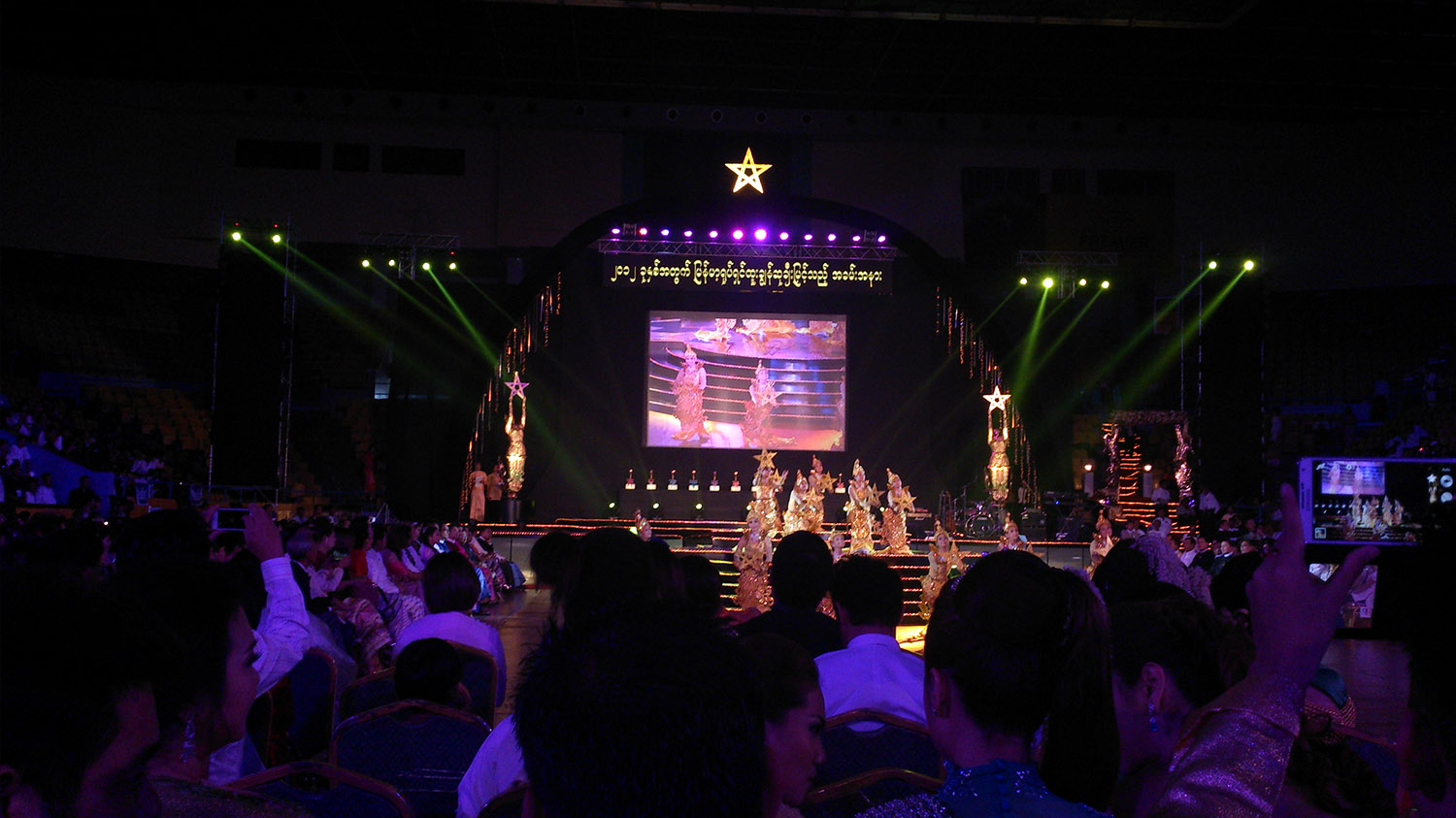
Myanmar Academy Award Ceremony held for 2012 Movies

The Myanmar Motion Picture Academy Awards are presented annually to honour both artistic and technical excellence of professionals in the Burmese Film Industry of Myanmar. The awards ceremony has been held annually since 1952. Each winner is presented with a golden statue and in recent years also a cash prize.

== History ==
The awards were first introduced in 1952, and the ceremony has been held annually since 1952 (apart from 1963, 1986, 1987, and 1988). In the first awards ceremony, only three kinds of awards (Best Film, Best Actor and Best Actress) were presented. In the beginning, second and third place prizes for Best Film category were also given. Over time the awards ceremony has expanded significantly; in 1954, a Best Director award was introduced with the second and third place prizes for Best Film being removed in 1955. In 1955, first Special Award for Best Child Artist was awarded. In 1956 a Best Cinematography award was created, and in 1962, Best Supporting Actor and Actress awards were also introduced. In 1990, the number of awards reached 10 with the addition of Best Screenplay, Best Music and Best Sound awards. The awards have topped out at 11 with the addition of a Best Editing award. In 2017, Myanmar Academy Awards introduced the Lifetime Achievement Award category.

Adding to the unpredictability of the awards ceremony are prizes given to Special Awards some years and the duplication of awards when the judging panel cannot decide who should win. And of course, sometimes awards are simply not awarded if it is decided that no person is worthy.

The first film to win the Best Picture award was Chit Thet Wai (Dear Thet Wai) in 1952. The best director award was first given to U Thukha for his Aww Main Ma (Oh, women!), a comic drama. Actor Kyaw Win won the first best actor award in Marlaryi with Kyi Kyi Htay winning Best Actress for her performance in Chit Thet Wai (Dear Thet Wai).

As of 2017, there are total of 13 awards.

1. Best Picture
2. Best Director
3. Best Screenplay
4. Best Actor
5. Best Actress
6. Best Supporting Actor
7. Best Supporting Actress
8. Best Music
9. Best Cinematography
10. Best Film Editing
11. Best Sound
12. Special Award
13. Lifetime Achievement Award

== List of Myanmar Motion Picture Academy Awards ==
1999

- Best Film - Father's Place (Thiha Zaw Film Production)
- Best Director - Khin Maung Oo & Soe Thein Htut (Father's Place)
- Best Actor - Lwin Moe (Winter in the heart)
- Best Actress - Htun Eaindra Bo (Hnaung Ta Myae Myae)
- Best Supporting Actor - Htun Htun Win (Hnaung Htone Phwae Metta)
- Best Supporting Actress - Myat Kathy Aung (Winter in the Heart)
- Special Award - Ei Phyu Soe (Winter in the Heart)

2000

- Best Actor - Thiha Tin Soe (Hell man)
- Best Actress - Myo Thandar Tun (Blade on the Lips)

2001

- Best Actor - Lwin Moe (Born of a flower)
- Best Actor - Min Maw Kun (Nha Lone Hla Lu Mike)
- Best Actress - May Than Nu (Else other side of love)
- Best Actress - Htet Htet Moe Oo (Tha Mee Mite)

2002

- Best Actor - Lu Min (Golden bling of sky)
- Best Actress - Khin Zar Chi Kyaw (Ngar, Thu Ta Bar, Youk Kyar, Main Ma)

2003

- Best Actor - Kyaw Hein (Sun borns Moon)
- Best Actress - Htun Eaindra Bo (A Mae Noe Boe)

2004

- Best Actor - Lwin Moe (Once Nights of Ayeyarwaddy)
- Best Actress - Eaindra Kyaw Zin (Myet Nar Myer Dae Moe Kaung Kin)

2005

- Best Actor - Lu Min (King Kyan Sitt)
- Best Actress - Htun Eaindra Bo (Moe Kot Set Wine Ko Kyaw Lon Ywae)

2006

- Best Actor - Yan Aung (Dignity of Extreme love)
- Best Actress - Nandar Hlaing (Loyalty of Taungsaman)

2007

- Best Actor - Kyaw Ye Aung (Ninety times of love)
- Leading Actress (Not awarded)

2008

- Khant Si Thu (A myar nae ma thet sai thaw thu)
- Moh Moh Myint Aung (Myint Mo Htet Ka Tarafu)

2009

- Nay Toe (Moe Nya Eain Met Myu)
- Leading Actress (not awarded)

2010

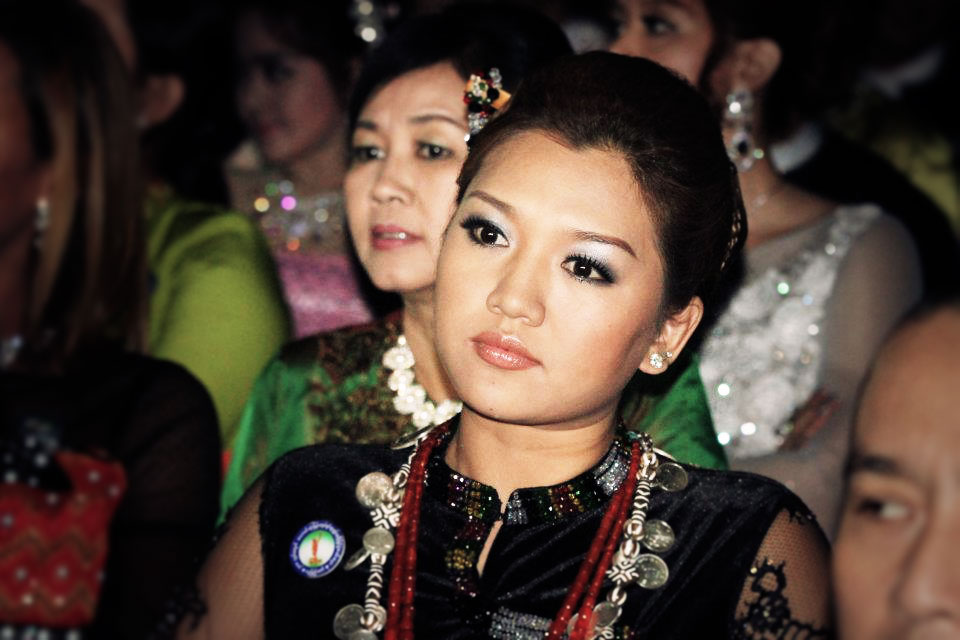
Thet Mon Myint 2010 Best Actress

- Best Actor - Pyay Ti Oo (Adam Eva Dassa)
- Best Actress - Thet Mon Myint (Adam Eva Dassa)

2011

- Best Actor - Naung Naung (Eternal rays of light)
- Best Actress - Melody (Eternal rays of light)

2012

- Pyay Ti Oo (Lat Pan)
- Phway Phway (Lat Pan)

2013

- Best Actor: Pyay Ti Oo (As you like)
- Best Actress: Wutt Hmone Shwe Yi (As you like)

2014

- Best Film: Phyo Yadanar Thwal (Goodmanner exist in mind)
- Best Leading Actor: Pyay Ti Oo (Made in Heart)
- Best Leading Actress: Khine Thin Kyi (Goodmanner exist in mind)
- Best Supporting Actor: Zin Wine (Made in Heart)
- Best Supporting Actress: Wutt Hmone Shwe Yi (Made in Heart)
- Best Screenplay: Zaw Myint Oo (Goodmanner exist in mind)
- Best Cinematography: Toe win, Pyi Soe (Endless love)
- Best Music: Khin Maung Gyi (Goodmanner exist in mind)
- Best Edit: Thaw Zin (Goodmanner exist in mind)
- Best Sound: Kyi Min Thein (Guile Project)

2015

- Best Director: Wyne (I'm Rose, Darling)
- Best Leading Actor: Nay Toe (Wrong Nat Khet of Battle)
- Best Leading Actress: Phway Phway (I'm Rose, Darling)
- Best Supporting Actor: Bay Lu Wa (Is This Called Love?)
- Best Supporting Actress: Goon Pone (Is This Called Love?)
- Best Music: Hla San Oo (Dear Wife)
- Best Edit: Zaw Min Han-Thar-Myay (Love House 2028)
- Best Cinematography: Zaw Myint (Salves of Cupid)

2016

- Best Film: Oak Kyar Myet Pauk
- Best Director: Nyunt Myanmar Nyi Nyi Aung (Oak Kyar Myet Pauk)
- Best Leading Actor: Tun Tun (Oak Kyar Myet Pauk)
- Best Leading Actress: Thet Mon Myint (Lovely Hate)
- Best Supporting Actor: Lu Min (Professor Dr. Sate Phwar II)
- Best Cinematography: Maung Myint, Aye Min, Ah Ngae Lay (Luu Yadanar Treasure)
- Best Music: Diramore (Luu Yadanar Treasure)
- Best Sound: Kyi Min Thein (Mhaw Kyauk Sar)
- Best Editor: Nyan Wint (Angel of Eden)
- Special award: The Jade World from Manaw Land

2017

- Best Film: Nay Chi Hmar Shwe Yi Laung
- Best Director: Sin Yaw Mg Mg (Eternal Mother)
- Best Leading Actor: Nay Toe (Tar Tay Gyi)
- Best Leading Actress: Eaindra Kyaw Zin (Knife in the Chest)
- Best Supporting Actor: Myint Myat (Kyun)
- Best Supporting Actress: Paing Phyo Thu (3Girls)
- Best Cinematography: Kyauk Phyu Ba-day-thar (3Girls)
- Best Music: Piano Tin Win Hlaing (Kun Lone Days 40)
- Best Sound: Thein Aung (Eternal Mother)
- Best Edit: O Win (Eternal Mother)
- Best Screenplay: Wyne (Yin Bek Htae Ka Dar)
- Lifetime Achievement: U Tint Aung (Bo Ga Lay)

2018

Award	Recipient	Film	Ref.
Best Film	Shwe Kyar		
Best Director	Aww Ratha	Clinging with Hate	
Best Leading Actor	Thu Htoo San	Weretiger	
Best Leading Actress	Phway Phway	Shwe Kyar	
Best Supporting Actor	Kyaw Kyaw Bo	Clinging with Hate	
Best Supporting Actress	Aye Myat Thu	Naung Dwin Oo Dan Twin Zay Dee	
Best Screenplay	Wyne	Shwe Kyar	
Best Music	Shalom M. Reynor	Dimensions	
Best Cinematography	Win Lwin Htet	Clinging with Hate	
Best Editing	Kyaw Khaing Soe	Shwe Kyar	

2023

Award	2019			2020			2022		
Award	Recipient	Film	Ref.	Recipient	Film	Ref.	Recipient	Film	Ref.
Best Film	—			Padauk Musical			Way Ma Nay Chin Bu		
Best Director	—			Mee Pwar	Padauk Musical		—		
Best Actor	Myint Myat	Yoma Paw Kya Tae Myet Yay		Sai Sai Kham Leng	Padauk Musical		Pyay Ti Oo	The Butterfly Trap	
Best Actress	Eaindra Kyaw Zin	Hit Tine		Soe Pyae Thazin	Golden Princess		Shwe Hmone Yati	Way Ma Nay Chin Bu	
Best Supporting Actor	Shwe Htoo	Dan Dar Yee Moe		Ohn Thee	Thaung Tike Ka Kyar Say Thar		—		
Best Supporting Actress	Khin Wint Wah	Palpitation in the Breeze		May Thinzar Oo	Golden Princess		—		
Best Screenplay	Maung Myat Swe	Responsible Citizen		—			—		
Best Music	Kyaw Kyaw Htun	The Milk Ogre		Aung Ko Latt	Gandaba: Strings of a Broken Harp		—		
Best Cinematography	Arkar Toe	Dan Dar Yee Moe		Phyo Kyaw	Padauk Musical		—		
Best Editing	G3, Kyaw Khine Soe	1014		—			Kyi Thar	The Butterfly Trap	

2024

Award	Recipient	Film	Ref.
Best Film	Kan Kaung		
Best Director	Tin Aung Soe	A Red Blanket	
Best Leading Actor	Yan Aung	A Red Blanket	
Best Leading Actress	Soe Myat Thuzar	Never Give Up	
Best Supporting Actor	Nay Win	Yee Ywae Moe	
Best Supporting Actress	May Myint Mo	Mone Khwint	
Best Screenplay	Nyo Min Lwin	The Teacher	
Best Music	Kaung Set Paing	Kan Kaung	
Best Cinematography	Win Lwin Htet	Kan Kaung	
Best Editing	—		

2025

Award	Recipient	Film	Ref.
Lifetime Achievement Award	Khin Lay Swe		
Lifetime Achievement Award	Htay Aung (Swe Burma)		
Lifetime Achievement Award	Kyi Soe Htun		
Best Actor	Myint Myat	Myay Sar (The Downtrodden)	
Best Actress	Yadanar Bo	Mg Mi Pha Yar (I want to be your queen)	
Best Actor in Supporting role	Nay Myo Aung	Myit Latt Tat Pay Malt Yay See Ka Kyan Tal (Tributary)	
Best Actress in Supporting role	Khine Hnin Wai	Mg Mi Pha Yar (I want to be your queen)	
Best Movie	-	Pann Myine Lal Ma Ou Yin Hmuu (Gardener)	
Best Director	Aww Ya Tha	Byaw Than (The Sound of Ceremonial Overture)	
Best Script	Mal Min Bone	Mg Mi Pha Yar (I want to be your queen)	

== Records ==
Most awards to a single film

- Htar Wa Ra A Linn Tan Myar
  (Eternal Rays of Light, 2011) = 8
- Ngar Thu Ta Bar Yauk Kyar Mein Ma
  (Me, Another, Men, Women, 2002) = 7
- A Mayh Noh Boe
  (Value of Mother's Milk, 2003) = 7
- Mystery of Snow
  (2004) = 7
- Taik Pwel Khaw Than
  (The Sound of War, 1995) = 5
- Myint Myat Hna Lon Thar
  (Noble Heart, 1997) = 5
- Hna Lon Hla Lu Mike
  (Good-Hearted Stupid Person, 2001) = 5
- Hsan Yay
  (Upstream, 2002) = 5
- Koe Sal Sah Thar Lein Mal
  (Ninety Times More Superior, 2007) = 5
- Pin Lal Htet Ka Nay Won Ni
  (The Red Sun at Above of Sea, 2010) = 5
- Kaung Kyoe Ko Hnite Ti Say Min
  (Keep Good Benefits at Your Body, 2014) = 5

Most awards won by a male

- Thukha = 8
  (Best Director (6), Best Picture (2))
- Nyunt Win = 7
  (Best Actor (3), Best Supporting Actor (4))
- Yan Aung = 7
  (Best Actor (7))
- Than Nyunt (Pan Thar) = 6
  (Best Cinematography (6))
- Zaw Min (Han Thar Myay) = 6
  (Best Film Editing (6))
- Zin Yaw Maung Maung = 6
  (Best Picture (3), Best Director (3))
- Maung Tin Oo = 5
  (Best Director (5))
- Kyaw Hein = 5
  (Best Actor (4), Best Supporting Actor (1))
- Kyi Soe Tun = 5
  (Best Director (4), Best Screenplay (1))
- Ko Ko Htay = 5
  (Best Cinematography (5))
- Pyay Ti Oo = 5
  (Best Actor (5))
- Chit Min Lu = 4 (Best Cinematography (4))
- Lu Min = 4
  (Best Actor (2), Best Picture (1), Best Supporting Actor (1))
- Kyauk Phyu (Pa Dy Thar) = 4
  (Best Cinematography (4))
- Wyne (Own Creator) = 4
  (Best Director (2), Best Screenplay (2))

Most awards won by a female

- Myint Myint Khin = 6
  (Best Actress (3), Best Supporting Actress (2), Lifetime Achievement (1) )
- May Than Nu = 5
  (Best Actress (4), Best Supporting Actress (1))
- Moh Moh Myint Aung = 5
  (Best Actress (4), Best Supporting Actress (1))
- Kyi Kyi Htay = 4
  (Best Actress (2), Best Supporting Actress (2))
- Cho Pyone = 4
  (Best Actress (2), Best Supporting Actress (2))

Most awards for Best Director

- Thukha = 6
- Maung Tin Oo = 5
- Kyi Soe Tun= 4
- Zin Yaw Maung Maung = 3

Most awards for Best Actor

- Yan Aung = 7
- Kyaw Hein = 5
- Pyay Ti Oo = 5
- Nyunt Win = 3
- Lwin Moe = 3
- Nay Toe = 3

Most awards for Best Actress

- May Than Nu = 4
- Moh Moh Myint Aung = 4
- Myint Myint Khin = 3
- Wah Wah Win Shwe = 3
- Khin Thidar Htun = 3
- Htun Eaindra Bo = 3
- Phway Phway = 3
- Eaindra Kyaw Zin = 3

Most awards for Best Supporting Actor

- Nyunt Win = 4
- Kyauk Lon = 3
- Bo Ba Ko = 2
- Zaw Lin = 2
- Nay Aung = 2
- Zin Wyne = 2

Most awards for Best Supporting Actress

- Kyi Kyi Htay = 2
- Aye Aye Thin = 2
- May Nwet = 2
- Myint Myint Khin = 2
- Myint Myint Khaing = 2
- Cho Pyone = 2
- Soe Myat Nandar = 2
- Myat Kay Thi Aung = 2
- May Thinzar Oo = 3

Most awards for Best Screenplay

- Nyein Min = 3
- Zaw Myint Oo = 2
- Wyne (Own Creator) = 2

Most awards for Music

- Gita Lulin Maung Ko Ko = 3
- Zaw Myo Htut = 3
- Khin Maung Gyi = 3

Most awards for Best Cinematography

- Than Nyunt (Pan Thar) = 6
- Ko Ko Htay = 5
- Chit Min Lu = 4
- Kyauk Phyu (Pa Dy Thar) = 4
- San Maung = 3

Most awards for Best Sound

- San Oo = 2
- Kyi Min Thein = 2

Most awards for Best Film Editing

- Zaw Min (Han Thar Myay) = 6
- U Myint Khaing = 3

== Significance ==
The significance of the awards has fluctuated along with the health of Burmese cinema. The number of eligible film entries each year has declined dramatically since the 1980s. Due to heightened competition from foreign films and other entertainment media as well as escalating costs of production, the number of feature-length Burmese films has gone from nearly 100 films per year in the 1970s to barely more than ten today. The number of films screened were 95 in 1978, 75 in 1983, 65 in 1985. In 2008, only 12 were screened. As the Burmese film industry struggles to produce films each year, films that do get produced are mostly with established directors, actors and actresses. Most Burmese films today are dominated by comedies.

The result is that the same coterie of players win the award year after year from a much shallower pool. It used to be that only few actors and actresses could claim as "academy award winner" or even fewer still as "repeat academy award winner". Venerable actors of old like Win Oo and Kawleikgyin Ne Win won just two each in their lifetime. Director Thukha and actress Myint Myint Khin who won six and five respectively were the exceptions, not the rule.

== See also ==
- Myanmar Motion Picture Museum
