= Myanmar Motion Picture Museum =

- မြန်မာ့ရုပ်ရှင်သမိုင်းပြတိုက်
- Established: November 1998
- Location: Wingabar Street, Yangon, Myanmar
- Coordinates: 16°47′42″N 96°09′36″E
- Type: Film Museum
- Owner: Myanmar Motion Picture Organisation (MMPO)

The Myanmar Motion Picture Museum is a film museum dedicated to the Cinema of Burma located in Yangon. It is housed in a building which was formerly the headquarters of the Myanmar Motion Picture Organisation (MMPO).

It was established in November 1998 to display the efforts of successful film directors, actors and producers in the motion picture history of the country.

The museum has seven sections devoted to the silver quadrennial (1920–1945), golden quadrennial (1946–1970), diamond quadrennial (1971–1995) and ruby quadrennial (1996–2020) periods, movie props and makeup, technical equipment, and best achievement awards.

== Visitors ==
In 2001 July 7, members of Bengal Initiative, a think tank of Calcutta, India, visited the museum.
