= Golden Princess (2020 film) =

2020 Burmese film

- film poster
- Burmese: ရွှေမင်းသမီး
- Directed by: Mee Pwar
- Screenplay by: Moe Ni Lwin
- Starring: Pyay Ti Oo; Kyaw Kyaw Bo; Kaung Pyae; Zin Wine; Cho Pyone; May Thinzar Oo; Soe Pyae Thazin
- Production company: MMN Entertainment Film Production
- Release date: February 13, 2020
- Running time: 120 minutes
- Country: Myanmar
- Language: Burmese

Golden Princess (Burmese: ရွှေမင်းသမီး) is a 2020 Burmese drama film, directed by Mee Pwar starring Pyay Ti Oo, Kyaw Kyaw Bo, Kaung Pyae, Zin Wine, Cho Pyone, May Thinzar Oo and Soe Pyae Thazin. The film, produced by MMN Entertainment Film Production premiered Myanmar on February 13, 2020.

== Cast ==
- Pyay Ti Oo as Nyein Htoo
- Soe Pyae Thazin as Shwe Yi
- Kyaw Kyaw Bo as Oak Soe Kha
- Kaung Pyae as Nay Ye
- Zin Wine as U Kyaw Nyein
- May Thinzar Oo as Daw Shwe Hmone
- Cho Pyone
