= Kyaw Thu =

Burmese actor and director (born 1959)

- ကျော်သူ
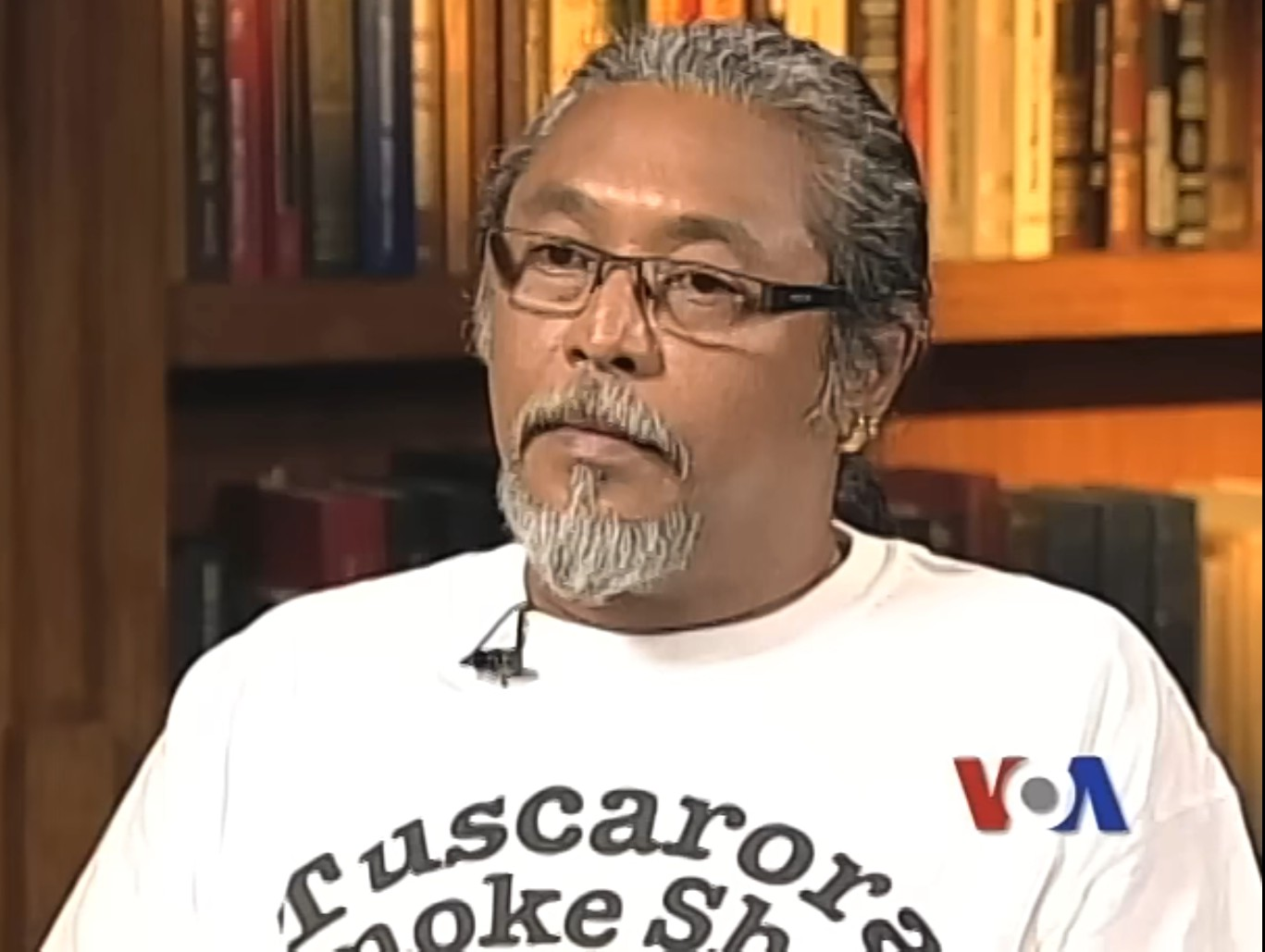
- Kyaw Tun during a VOA interview in 2012
- Born: Kyaw Win; 2 November 1959 (age 66); Yangon, Myanmar
- Education: University of Yangon
- Occupations: Actor, director
- Years active: 1984–present
- Known for: Da Byi-Thu Ma Shwe Hta (1994); Amay No-Bo (2003)
- Spouse: Myint Myint Khin Pe
- Children: Pyi Thein Kyaw, Myint-Mo Oo
- Awards: Ramon Magsaysay Award

Kyaw Thu (Burmese: ကျော်သူ, pronounced [kɔ̀ θù]; born 2 November 1959) is a two-time Myanmar Academy Award winning film actor and film director. One of the top leading men of Burmese cinema in the 1980s and 1990s, Kyaw Thu has starred in over 200 films and has directed several successful films. Since the early 2000s, Kyaw Thu has devoted a significant amount of time to social work for the poor, and in the process has gradually emerged as a vocal critic of the Burmese military government.

== Early life ==
Kyaw Thu was born Kyaw Win (ကျော်ဝင်း, [tɕɔ̀ wɪ́ɴ]) on November 2, 1959 to father U Sein Tin and mother Daw Mya Than. He studied Physics major (correspondence) at University of Yangon up to final year. He met his future wife Myint Myint Khin Pe (also known as Shwe Zee Kwet) when they were both attending university at Hlaing Campus. They got married in 1978 during his final year at the university. They have a son Pyi Thein Kyaw and a daughter Myint Mo Oo.

Kyaw Thu made his film debut in 1984 in the film Chit Kyoe Lay Net Myin. He has starred in over 200 films and directed six films in a career spanning over two decades. In the 1980s and 1990s, Kyaw Thu was one of the most successful leading men in Burmese cinema. Kyaw Thu won the 1994 Myanmar Academy Award for Best Actor in Da-Byi-Thu Ma Shwe Hta (တပြည်သူမရွှေထား; lit. Miss Shwe Hat, the Foreigner). Many believe that Kyaw Thu would have won more awards had he been more pliant with the propaganda demands of Myanmar Motion Picture Organization (MMPO), which gives out the annual awards. Until 1994, he refused to do a propaganda film. In 1993, one of his films received popular and critical acclaim but failed to win a single award. In 1994, he finally agreed to do a pro-government film, and came his win with Da-Byi-Thu, which he feels is inferior to his previous work. He won his second Academy Award in 2003 for the Best Director in the film Amay No Bo (အမေ့နို့ဖိုး). His latest scuffle with the authorities—he was arrested in October 2007 for supporting the anti-government protests led by the monks—surely will not win him more awards. In October 2007, his latest HIV/AIDS awareness film, A-Kywin-Mè Longyon-Ya (အကြွင်းမဲ့ လုံခြုံရာ), has been blocked by the government censorship board.

== Social work and politics ==
Kyaw Thu has used his prominence to help the country's poor. He is founder and vice president (now President) of the Free Funeral Service Society (FFSS), which provides free funeral services to the poor.

In collaboration with the famous author/movie director U Thukha, Kyaw Thu and his wife Shwe Zee Kwet founded the Free Funeral Service Society (Yangon). The organisation offers funeral services free of charge to people of all race, religion and background. On January 1, 2001, the FFSS began providing free funeral services. The first funeral service was of the famous sculptor U Han Tin whose hearse Kyaw Thu himself drove. From 2001 January to 2012 October, the organisation has undertaken at least 120,000 funerals free of charge. The organisation currently undertakes up to 40 funerals each day.

In 2003, Kyaw Thu was elected vice president of FFSS (Ygn). Since 2008, he has been serving as the president of FFSS (Ygn).

Since 2003, his society has also helped pay medical costs in poor neighborhoods of Yangon. In 2007 April, the organisation was expanded to Thukha Charity Clinic where free healthcare is provided with the help of volunteer doctors, medical specialists and surgeons. As of 2013 March, the clinic has provided healthcare to over 143,000 patients. Similar clinics have been founded in Pyay, Pegu, and Kyobingauk regions as well.

Thukha Ah-lin library and free educational and vocational training classes are also run by the organisation. The organisation also provides Emergency Aid to disaster areas. FFSS organisation is fully run and operated by donations and volunteers by the Myanmar people.

Through his funeral services society, Kyaw Thu was active in rescue and support efforts in the aftermath of May 2008 Cyclone Nargis which completely devastated Burma's Irrawaddy delta and cost over 130,000 lives. As of June 2008, the society had helped to raise K500 million (~US$400,000) for the victims of the disaster.

The humanitarian efforts Kyaw Thu has made through FFSS (Ygn) include Nargis Cyclone relief, contribution of potable water and building water wells and reservoirs in water shortage areas, distribution of relief aid to fire victims of Mingalataungnyunt Township and Hlaing Thaya Township, rendering humanitarian assistances to war victims in Kachin State and refugees in the unrest area of Rakhine, donating medicines and cash to the injured monks and people in crash against the Letpatdaung copper mine project, providing foods, medicines and cash to the victims of the communal violence and Meiktila and speaking words of encouragement to them.

In 2007 Saffron Revolution, Kyaw Thu and Daw Myint Myint Khin Pe publicly supported the protesting monks. Because of this, they were detained by the junta for seven days. Kyaw Thu was also banned from the filming career.

As part of the response to the February 1 military coup, emergency response teams from the FFSS helped treat injured protesters in attacks by police and military. The FFSS led by Kyaw Thu supported numerous people involved in the civil disobedience movement and also announced it wouldn’t provide family members of police or military personnel with funerals and health care after witnessing the security force's killings of the protestors, whereas the military council made terrible threats to the civil servants and forced them to work. As a result, the FFSS office in Yangon was raided in the mid-night, volunteers and staff staying at the office beaten and computers and electronic devices confiscated by the security force. On 4 March, Kyaw Thu was prosecuted for inciting the government staff to participate in the CDM under Article 505(a) of the Myanmar Penal Code. Several days before this, his wife, the organization's finance officer, was charged with the same accusation as well.

== Personal life ==
Kyaw Thu is married to Myint Myint Khin Pe. They have a son, Pyi Thein Kyaw, and a daughter, Myint Mo Oo, and three grandsons.

== International recognition and awards ==
In 2009 April, he was awarded the prize “the artist who stands for the fellow people” by the Myanmar community in London. In April 2010, Myanmar community worldwide from 54 countries voted him to be honoured with the award “Citizen of Burma” presented by the Citizen of Burma Award Organization.

In 2011 November, Immanuel Theological Institute (Main Church), Union Biblical Seminary (Yangon), International School of Theology (Bangkok), and Online Bible College International (Australia) together awarded him with D.H.S.S (Doctor of Humane Social Services) and his wife with M.A.S.S (Masters of Social Services) at the Emmanuel Church, Yangon.

In 2012 September, National Endowment for Democracy (NED) honored him with NED award in Washington DC. He was honored with Ramon Magsaysay Award in 2015.

== See also ==
- Myanmar Motion Picture Museum
- List of Myanmar Motion Picture Academy Awards
