= Tekkatho Phone Naing =

Burmese famous writer

- တက္ကသိုလ် ဘုန်းနိုင်
- Born: Khin Maung Tint; 16 January 1930; British Burma
- Died: January 2002 (aged 71–72); Yangon, Myanmar
- Education: Columbia University
- Occupations: Author, Poet, Professor

Tekkatho Bhone Naing (Burmese: တက္ကသိုလ် ဘုန်းနိုင်, 16 January 1930 – 2002) was a famous Burmese writer, primarily known for lovelorn stories that were most popular in the 1950s to 1970s. His "sad" stories still represent some of the best popular Burmese story writing in the postwar era.

== Overview ==
Tekkatho Phone Naing was the pen name of Khin Maung Tint (ခင်မောင်တင့်), a lifelong university professor and later Chancellor of University of Moulmein. He received a Master's degree in psychology from Columbia University. During the 1988 popular uprising against the government of Burma, he called for restraint and true democracy. The military junta forced him to retire from his position as Rector of the Institute of Education, Yangon.

He died in 2002 at the age of 72.

== Literary career ==
Khin Maung Tint began writing in the 1950s under the pseudonym Tekatho Phone Naing. As with many writers of that day, he took on the title Tekkatho which means university, signifying him as a university graduate.

Most Tekkatho Phone Naing novels are love stories between a man and a woman of different social station and wealth that typically end in separation and sorrow. It would be unfair to call his stories tearjerkers however. The unhappy ending is not the only thing that makes his stories different from workaday Burmese love stories. His stories explore social issues—always ignored by escapist stories—to wrenching details.

His notable works include:

- Thu Kyun Ma Khan Byi (Never Shall We Be Enslaved) (1959). It deals with and is based on aspects of the palace intrigues and the resistance – mainly feeble and ineffective- that was offered to the invading British troops just before the fall of Mandalay (and the entire Burmese kingdom) to the British in November 1885.
- Thangègyin Lo Bè Set Ywei Khaw Myi Khaing (Will Continue to Call You as a Friend, Khaing)
- Da Byi Thu Ma Shwe Htar (Miss Htar the Foreigner)
- Maung Bawa Nya A Lar Kwal (Maung's Life like night)

He was also an accomplished poet.
