= Sin Yaw Mg Mg =

Burmese film director and producer

Sin Yaw Maung Maung
- Born: Sanchaung Township, Yangon, Myanmar
- Occupations: Film producer, Film director
- Years active: 1983 -
- Spouse: May Than Nu(divorce)
- Children: Min Thant Mg Mg
- Parent(s): U Kan Htoo and Daw Khin Ti
- Website: www.sinyawmgmg.com

Sin Yaw Mg Mg or Zinyaw Maung Maung is Burmese film director and film producer. His 2004 film Hlyo-hwat-thaw-hnin or Mystery of Snow was released internationally.

== Biography ==
His real name is U Lyn Aung. He is son of U Kan Htoo and Daw Khin Ti. He lived at No. 6-A, Myaynigone Plaza, Bargayar Street, Sanchaung Township, Yangon, Myanmar, near the Dagon Center. He was awarded a M.Sc. degree in mathematics in 1983, from the University of Yangon. He entered into the film business as a production manager in 1983, with the film The Second Heartbreak of the Third Age. He became famous with the video Maung (Darling). Between 1989 and 1995, he acted as treasurer, joint secretary and as general secretary for the Myanmar Motion Picture Organization (MMPO).

He married Daw Than Than Sint (aka) May Than Nu, a Myanmar film actress. They have a son together named Min Thant Mg Mg, born on July 3, 1997.

== Filmography ==
=== Film ===
- Rain Fall In The Orbit Dear NYO 1992
- The Foreign Citizen, Miss HTA 1993
- The Missing Recorded in the History of Heart 1993
- Beyond the Summer 1994
- Too Cruel Forming Hatred? 1995
- Don't Hate of the Ngapali 1999
- Another Side of love 2001
- Mystery of Snow 2004
- The Moon Lotus (Pann Kyar Wutt Hmone) 2011
- Eternal Mother (2017 Myanmar Film)

=== Video ===
- Please do not hesitate darling
- Maung(Darling)
- Never will take revenge
- To a farther place
- Even the greatest ocean has a boundary bank
- The lighted lamp at the ceiling sky
- River Irrawaddy, the supreme witness
- King Lions' forces (power) which will rise up to the sky
- Light Web
- The unmitigated golden country surrounded by the shining stars
- The winter which destroys Monsoon winds
- Home returning of birds flying against wind current
- Could not forget

=== VCD ===
- The journey of Too Big
- Never ending

=== DVD ===
- Symbols of Dramatic Myanmar

== See also ==
- Sin Yaw Film Production
