= Phway Phway =

Burmese actress and model

- အလင်္ကာကျော်စွာ ဖွေးဖွေး
- Born: Shwe Yee Ko Oo; 9 August 1988 (age 38); Mogok, Mandalay Division, Socialist Republic of the Union of Burma (now Mogok, Mandalay Region, Myanmar)
- Education: University of Foreign Languages, Yangon
- Occupations: Actress, Model
- Years active: 2007–present
- Parent(s): U Mg Oo; Daw Theingi
- Awards: Myanmar Academy Award (Best Actress for 2012, 2015, 2018)

Phway Phway (Burmese: ဖွေးဖွေး, pronounced [pʰwé pʰwé]; born Shwe Yee Ko Oo on 9 August 1988) is a three-time Myanmar Academy Award winning Burmese film actress. She is the third highest-paid actress of Myanmar according to records.

Phway Phway won her first Myanmar Academy Award in 2012 with the film Let Pan, achieved her second award in 2015 with the film I'm Rose, Darling and third award in 2018 with the film Shwe Kyar. All films were directed by four-time Myanmar Academy Award winner Wyne.

== Early life and education ==
Phway Phway was born on 9 August 1988 in Mogok, Burma to her parents U Mg Oo and Daw Theingi. She attended high school at the Kamayut 2 High School from 1993 to 2004, and graduated from University of Foreign Languages, Yangon with a Bachelor of Arts degree in Korean in 2008.

== Career ==
Phway Phway had a great interest in becoming a singer as a child. She and her friends formed a band, "Art of Depression" with her as a vocalist. At university, she began modeling; her first modeling opportunity was for the MAX Calendar in 2007 with the name Shwe Yee Ko Oo which is her birth name. Then she named herself as Phway Phway as her actress name. Her modeling career led to appearing in music videos and TV commercials, and direct-to-video films. She starred in over 100 video films and appeared on many magazine covers. She was awarded a successful new face actress in 2009 People Magazine Award and the best leading actress in "Lat Pan" movie (which was her very first movie) in Myanmar Academy Awards 2012.

She created her first MTV show called MyWorld in August 2020.

== Personal life ==
Besides acting, singing and modeling, Phway Phway also has great interest in fashion designing. She believes that if she was not involved in the entertainment industry, she would have studied fashion and created her own label. She is the cousin of Myanmar model and actress Wutt Hmone Shwe Yi. Phway Phway was listed as the second youngest Academy Award Winner after Soe Pyae Thazin. Phway Phway's fans called her "Phway Sein".

== Political activities ==
Following the aftermath of the 2021 Myanmar coup d'état, Phway Phway was active in the anti-coup movement both in person at rallies and through social media. Denouncing the military coup, she has taken part in protests since February. She joined the "We Want Justice" three-finger salute movement. The movement was launched on social media, and many celebrities have joined the movement. She donated 144 meals of butter rice and chicken curry to the protesters. She also donated 15 lakh Burmese Kyats to government employees who involved in CDM, to commemorate General Aung San's ‌birthday on 13 February 2021.

On 3 April 2021, warrants for her arrest were issued under section 505 (a) of the Myanmar Penal Code by the State Administration Council for speaking out against the military coup. Along with several other celebrities, she was charged with calling for participation in the Civil Disobedience Movement (CDM) and damaging the state's ability to govern, with supporting the Committee Representing Pyidaungsu Hluttaw, and with generally inciting the people to disturb the peace and stability of the nation.

== Filmography ==
=== Films (Big Screen Movies) ===
Lists of Films
Year	Film	Director	Co-Stars	Role	Notes
2012	Red Cotton Silk Flower	Wyne	Pyay Ti Oo, Soe Myat Thuzar	Let Pan	Won The Best Actress Myanmar Academy Award
2013	Zat Lan Haung Tway Shi Khae' Yin	Khin Mg Oo Soe Thein Htut	Khant Si Thu, Min Maw Kun, Htun Htun, Moe Moe, Soe Myat Thuzar	Shwe Yatu (Tu Tu)	
2014	Mar Yar Project	Wyne	Nay Toe, Thet Mon Myint	Swae Nhyoe Shin	
2014	Thet Tan Thit (New Rainbow)	Wyne	Aung Ye Lin	Thae Su Nway	
2014	Ko Tint Toh Super Yat Kwat	Kyaw Zaw Lin	Ah Yine, Moe Pyae Pyae Maung, Nay Toe, Pyay Ti Oo, Myint Myat, Aung Ye Lin, Eaindra Kyaw Zin, Thet Mon Myint, Wutt Hmone Shwe Yi	Khin Chaw	Special Guest
2015	Online Paw Ka Wit Nyin	Nyi Nyi Htun Lwin	Nay Toe, Zay Ye' Htet	Shin Min Sett	
2015	I'm Rose, Darling	Wyne	Nay Toe, Yoon Yoon, Heavy Phyo	Htar Tha Khin	Won The Best Actress Myanmar Academy Award
2015	A Thet Ko A Thet Htet Po Ywae Chit The	Ko Zaw (Ar Yone Oo)	Aung Ye Lin	May Thet Maung	
2015	Slaves of Cupid	Wyne	Nay Toe, Sai Sai Kham Leng	Ent Yoon	Her Masterpiece
2016	Yite Lite Par Own "Done Done Done"	Thein Han (Phoenix)	Khant Si Thu	Moe Thar Phyu Phyu	
2016	Color Sone Lesson (Colorful Lesson)	Mee Pwar	Sai Sai Kham Hlaing	Phyu Phyu	
2017	Pa Hta Ma Htat Honey Moon (Honey Moon To First Floor)	Nyo Min Lwin	Zay Ye Htet, Soe Myat Thuzar	Phyu	
2017	Kat Pi Ya	Ko Zaw (Dawn)	Pyay Ti Oo, Kaung Pyae	Mya Chit	
2017	Phone Kanyar Nhapar	Ko Zaw (Dawn)	Myint Myat	Wuttyi Hmway	
2017	3Girls	Wyne	A Lin Yaung, Ei Chaw Po, Paing Phyo Thu	Khaung Pwint Hlwar	
2018	Shwe Kyar	Wyne	A Lin Yaung, Thinzar Wint Kyaw, Khin Zar Chi Kyaw	Shwe Kyar	Won The Best Actress Myanmar Academy Award
2018	CO2 (Carbon Dioxide)	Wyne	A Lin Yaung, Kyaw Htet Aung, Yadanar Bo	Thar Yar	
2018	The Storm that Kissed Me	Aung Zaw Lin, Win Lwin Htet	Hlwan Paing, Yair Yint Aung	Wint Shin Pyo	
2018	Eaik Hti Ya	Ko Zaw (Ar Yone Oo)	A Lin Yaung, Soe Myat Thuzar, Khine Thin Kyi, Ko Pauk	Hsan Khet	
2018	Letter To President	Wyne	A Lin Yaung, Chan Min Ye Htut, Ah Yine, May Sue Maung, Daw San San Win	Khet Khet Khine	
2018	Clinging with Hate	Aww Ya Tha	Nay Toe, Min Thway, Kyaw Kyaw Bo, Aye Wutt Yee Thaung	Ma Thae Ohmm	
2018	Bride	Wyne	A Lin Yaung, May	Thawdar	
2018	Yee Sar Ta Won Kwal	Ko Zaw (Dawn)	Sai Sai Kham Leng, Mya Hnin Yee Lwin	Ei Tone	
2019	Kyar Tot The Lal Maung Sakar	Mee Pwar	Sai Sai Kham Leng, Htun Htun	Tin Tin Zaw	
2019	Palpitation in the Breeze	Wyne	Kyaw Ye Aung, Moht Moht Myint Aung	Khin Nyein Chan	–
2019	Bal Nyar Bal Nyar (Left Right, Left Right)	Wyne	Myint Myat	Pone Pone	
2019	Stranger's House	Htoo Paing Zaw Oo	Lwin Moe, Htun Aeindra Bo, Lin Zarni Zaw, Charlie, Shein Tin Htoo, Myat Noe Aye, Ku Ku Zin Aung, Joker	Nway Oo	
2019	Pa Pa Wadi See Yin Khan	Wyne	Moe Hay Ko, A Lin Yaung, Htun Htun	Thet Htar Khin	
2022	The Butterfly Trap	Wyne	Pyay Ti Oo	Kyi Thar Moe Pwint	
2022	Yee Sarr Yway Nee (Way to Choose a Boyfriend )	Pwint Theingi Zaw(Dawn)	Myint Myat, Aye Chan Maung, Htet Aung Shine	Darli Sein Win	
2023	Yaw Tha Ma Mway	Ko Zaw(Dawn)	Hlwan Paing, Yair Yint Aung, Project K, Phyu Phyu Htwe	Oppa San	
2024	Shwe Phuu Sar	Pwint Theingi Zaw(Dawn)	Paing Takhon, Kaung Myat San, Yoon Waddy Lwin Moe	Yway Yway Yin	
2025	Kant Kaw Ni(Red Cobra Saffron)	Wyne	A Linn Yaung, Chan Min Ye Htut, Shwe Thamee	Khin May Tint	
2025	A Gyi Gyi(အကြီးကြီး)	Pwint Theingi Zaw	Nay Win, Soe Myat Thuzar,		
2026	Black Sheep	Kaung Myat	Lwin Moe, Aung Yay Chan, Nay Htut, Lin Zar Ni Zaw, Than Thar Nyi		

=== Direct-to-video ===
Years	Titles	Directors	Co-stars
2009	Natthami Lay Mya Ye Koyandaw	Thein Han	Kyaw Ye Aung, May Kabyar, Pearl Win, Thazin
2009	A Pyar Yaung Muthar	Myo Min	Kyaw Kyaw Bo, Nay Zan, Mo Mo Myint Aung
2010	A Lin Pyot Chein	Myo Min	Ye Deight, Mo Mo Myint Aung
2010	Myat Thaw Kyayzu	Kyi Phyu Shin	Ye Aung, Aung Ye Lin, Myo Sandi Htun, Hla Inzali Thint
2010	24 Nar Yee Ta Yet	Nay Mai	Aung Ye Lin, May Kabyar
2010	Coffee Chit Thu	Zaw Ko Ko	Nay Toe, Ye Aung
2010	Ta Khar Ka	Mee Bwar	Myint Myat, Aye Thin Cho
2010	Yin Khone Than	Wyne (Own Creator)	Pyay Ti Oo
2010	Maung Shay Ko Tae Tae Shauk Me Lay	Okka Bo	Min Mawgun, Ye Aung, Phoe Kyaw
2010	Gant Gaw Ta Pwint Kout Ya Htar Thi	Myo Min	Kaung Khant
2010	A Phyu Yaung Maryar	Htuu Thar	Nay Toe, Ye Aung, Su Pan Htwar
2011	3	Yee Zaw	Ye Deight, Moe Moe
2011	Han Saung Khar Mu Po	Kyaw Zhaw Lin	Aung Ye Lin
2011	A-Kyi Ta Chet Hmar A Thet Par Thwar Tel	Myo Min	Khant Sithu, Khine Thin Kyi
2011	Yindwin A-Shoke Tawbon	Kyaw Zhaw Lin	Pyay Ti Oo, Moe Yu San
2011	Pinle Minthar	Kyi Phyu Shin	Aung Ye Lin
2011	Chit Thu	Aung Ba Pa War	Ye Deight
2011	Kya Naw Ei Dat-Taing	Thar Gyi	Min Maw Khun, Pan Phyu
2011	Chway Tar Ya Kaung Hmann Ma Thi Aung Chit Tae Kaung Ma Lay	Myo Min	Kaung Khant, Min Htain, Wah Soe Moe Oo, Su Pyae
2011	Lu-nyo-chaw Yae Ahtoupatti	Wine	Nay Min, Nay San, Thura Lin, Lin Zarni Zaw, Phu Phu, War Soe Moe Oo, Ingyin
2011	Myet-yay Abidan	Wine	Aung Ye Lin, May Kabyar
2011	Khan Kya Mar Go Yaung Sar Kya Thu Myar	Pout	Myint Myat
2011	Ah Myi Khan Chit Thu	Myo Min	Ye Deight
2012	Daddy Ka Meinkalay	Myo Min	Min Maw Koon
2012	Psycho Software	Wyne (Own Creator)	Aung Ye Lin
2012	Lwint Thwar De Tein Ta Sa	Myo Myint Swe	Ye Deight
2012	Mite Lone	Myo Min	Min Thway
2012	Hlaine Nae Lay	Wyne (Own Creator)	Nay Toe
2012	Hnin Yaii Nya	[[Wyne (Own Creator)]]	Aung Ye Lin
2012	Plain	Wyne (Own Creator)	Pyay Ti Oo
2012	Hnin Si Ko Bwar	Thar Gyi	Lu Min
2012	Byat Ma So	Ku Tho	Lwin Moe, Nandar Hlaing
2012	Chit Thu Lu Soe	Ko Zaw	Nay Min, May Kabyar
2012	Cyclone Baby	Ko Pout	Aung Ye Lin
2012	Natmimel Chi Te Kyoe	Aung Awba	Hein Wai Yan
2012	Nge Thu Yae Hna Lone Tha	Ko Zaw	Pyay Ti Oo
2012	A Pyo Taw Ka-kwat Nae Se Chin Htoe Tae Chit Thu	Ko Zaw	Aung Ye Lin
2012	A Mite Phone Tae Bike Ta Lone	Nyi Nyi Tun Lwin	Lu Min
2012	A Chit So The Mhar	Wyne (Own Creator)	Aung Ye Lin
2012	Chit Thu Nya Myar	Thar Gyi	Min Mawgun
2013	A Yaw A Sarr Pyinn Tel	Thar Gyi	Lu Min
2013	Lan Barr Nae Thwar Ghaw Ma	Maung Myo Min	Hein Wai Yan
2013	Fight, fight, fight	Sai Lone Kyauk	Ye Deight, Tin Maung San Min Win
2013	Puppet	Nyi Nyi Aung	Aung Ye Lin
2013	Yin Bat Phwint Tae Thawt Password	Nyo Min Lwin	Aung Ye Lin
2013	Byat Ma So	Ku Tho	Maung, Lwin Moe, Nandar Hlaing
2013	A Chit Thi Kyanmaryay Atwat Akaung Sone Koyantaw	Zaw Myo	Myint Myat, Ye Aung
2013	Hnalonethar Ko Chay Pyat Chin	Ko Zaw	Pyae Ti Oo, Soe Myat Nandar
2015	Taw Thu Lay		Kaung Pyae
2015	Chote Say	Pwint Theingi Zaw	Zay Ye Htet
2015	Butterfly's Story	Wyne	Nay toe
2016	Lady Color	Pwint Theingi Zaw	Zay Ye Htet

== Awards and nominations ==
Year	Award	Category	Nominated work	Result
2012	Myanmar Academy Award	Best Actress	Let Pan (The Red Cotton Silk Flower)	Won
2014	Myanmar Academy Award	Best Actress	Mar-Yar Project (Artifice Project)	Nominated
2015	Myanmar Academy Award	Best Actress	I'm Rose, Darling	Won
2018	Myanmar Academy Award	Best Actress	Shwe Kyar(The Golden Lotus)	Won
2019	Myanmar Academy Award	Best Actress	ကြာတော့သည်လည်း မောင့်စကား (Kyar Tot The Lal Maung Sakar)	Nominated
2020	Asia Model Awards	Asia Special Award		Won
2022	Myanmar Academy Award	Best Actress	ရည်းစားရွေးနည်း	Nominated
2025	Myanmar Academy Award	Best Actress	Kant Kaw Ni(Red Cobra Saffron)	Nominated
