= Patricia (actress) =

Burmese actress (born 1997)

- ပက်ထရစ်ရှာ
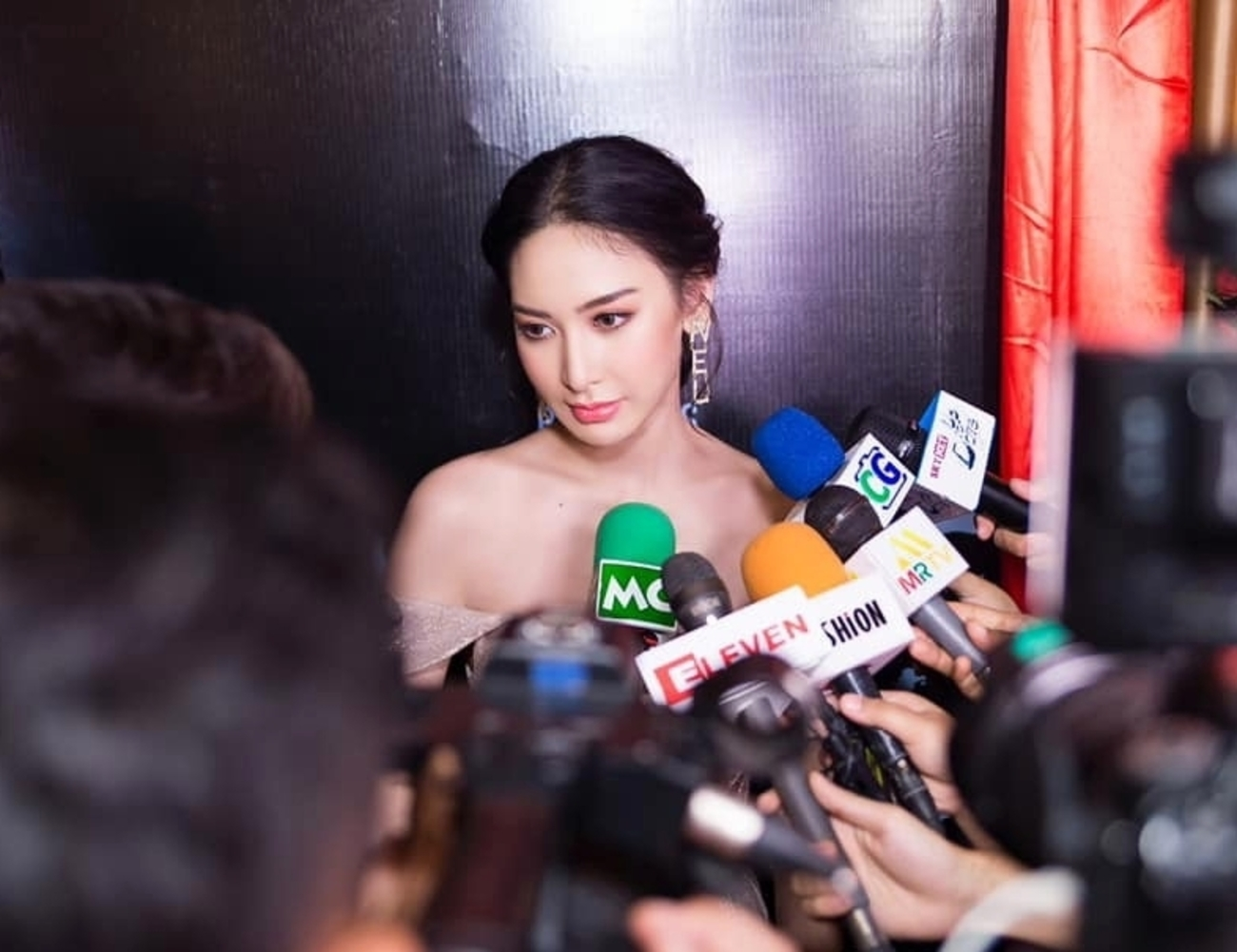
- Patricia in 2019
- Born: 13 December 1997 (age 28); Yangon, Myanmar
- Occupations: Actress, Model
- Years active: 2012–present
- Height: 5 ft 6 in (1.68 m)

Patricia (Burmese: ပတ်ထရစ်ရှာ), also Sue Sha Naing (Burmese: စူးရှနိုင်; born on 13 December 1997), is one of the highest paid Burmese actress and model. She began her entertainment career in 2012 as a photo model. She then made her acting debut in 2015, and gained popularity after starring in the film Yarzawin Yine Thu Myar which brought her wider recognition.

== Early life and education ==
Patricia was on born 13 December 1997 in Yangon, Myanmar to Burmese American parents. Her paternal grandfather is American, of Jewish descent, while her paternal grandmother is Burmese. Her mother was born in Yangon to Burmese-American parents. She received her secondary education and higher education from Practising School Yangon Institute of Education and Myanmar International School.

== Career ==
=== 2012–2014: Beginnings as a model ===
Patricia began her modeling career while in Grade 10. Actress Myat Kayti Aung is her aunt, whose acting Patricia reportedly hopes to emulate. Patricia has no formal training in acting; however she says actors Pyay Ti Oo and Myint Myat, and the director Mg Myo Min, have taught her a lot. Then, she appeared on many local magazine cover photos. Then came the offers for TV commercials. She has appeared countless more commercial advertisements. Her hardwork as a model and acting in commercials was noticed by the film industry and soon, movie casting offers came rolling in.

=== 2015: Film debut and recognition ===
Patricia made her acting debut in 2015 with a leading role in the film Ma Kyway Par Nae Sakura, alongside Aung Ye Lin, based on the novel by Ponnya Khin, and directed by Ko Zaw (Arr Yone Oo). She then starred the female lead in her second film Oo Yae A Yoke, alongside Pyay Ti Oo. The film was both a domestic hit, and led to increased recognition for Patricia. She has since appeared in over 30 films and the video markets crumpled.

=== 2016–present: Breaking into the big screen and rising popularity ===
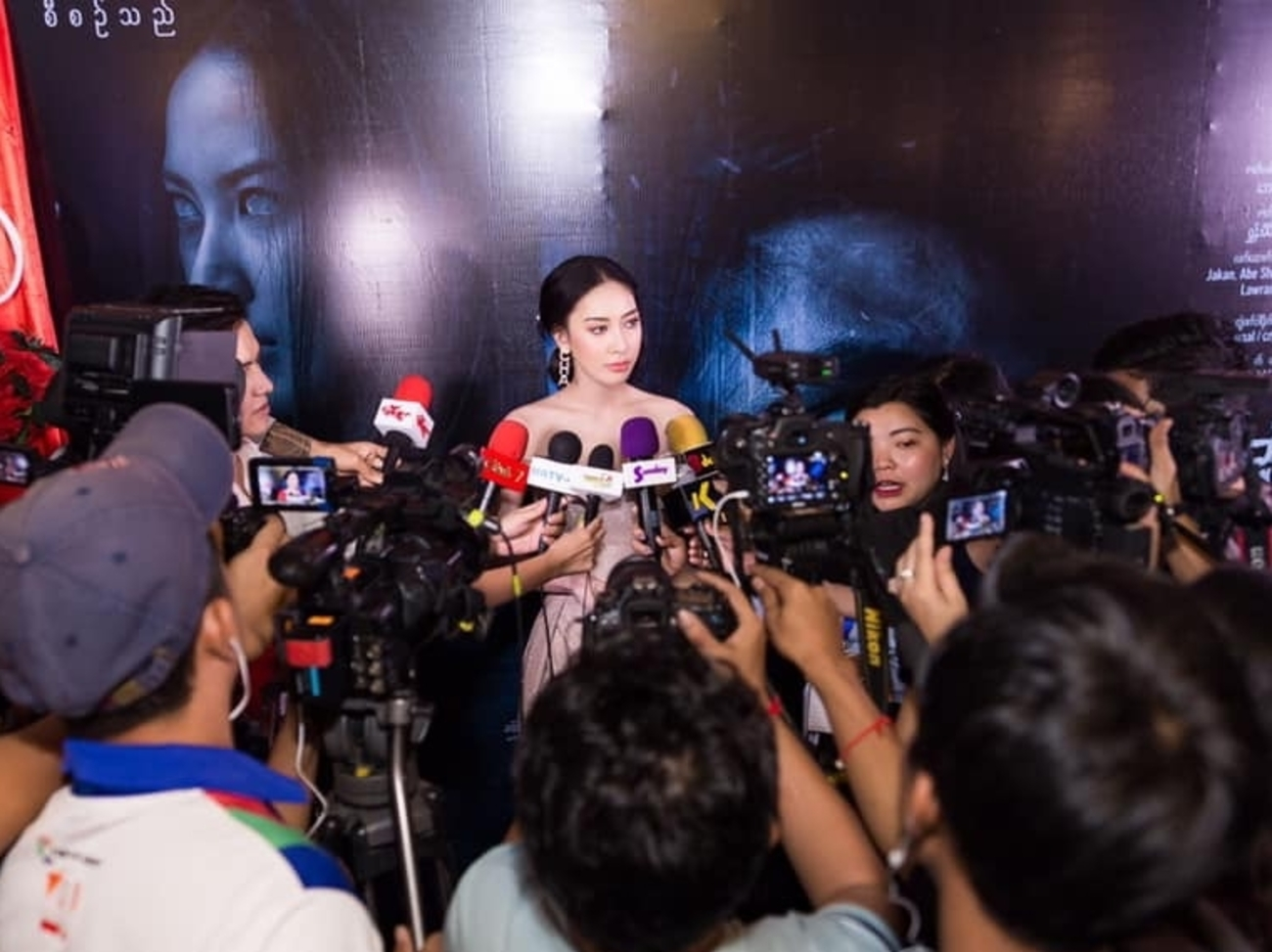
Patricia at her film Happy Ghost press show in 2019

She took on her first big-screen role in the film Yarzawin Yine Thu Myar, alongside Pyay Ti Oo, Myint Myat and Laila Kham, was screened in Myanmar cinemas in 2017 and received positive reviews for her portrayal of the character, which led to increased popularity for her. Her second big-screen film was Pego Sar and His Virus, alongside Pyay Ti Oo, Yaza Ne Win, Kyaw Ye Aung, Yan Aung and Soe Myat Thuzar, which screened in Myanmar cinemas on 16 December 2016. After this film, she starred in comedy film Zoot Kyar where she played the main role with Kyaw Ye Aung, Myint Myat, Moe Aung Yin, Ye Lay, Htet Aung Shine, Khine Thin Kyi, Thandar Bo and May, which screened in Myanmar cinemas on 29 September 2017 and processed huge hit and successes.

In 2017, she starred as one of the four female leads in action film Reflection alongside Eaindra Kyaw Zin, Wutt Hmone Shwe Yi and Htun Eaindra Bo which screened in Myanmar cinemas on 17 April 2018.

== Political activities ==
Following the 2021 Myanmar coup d'état, Patricia was active in the anti-coup movement both in person at rallies and through social media. Denouncing the military coup, she has taken part in protests since February. She joined the "We Want Justice" three-finger salute movement. The movement was launched on social media, and many celebrities have joined the movement.

On 5 April 2021, warrants for her arrest were issued under section 505 (a) of the penal code by the State Administration Council for speaking out against the military coup. Along with several other celebrities, she was charged with calling for participation in the Civil Disobedience Movement (CDM) and damaging the state's ability to govern, with supporting the Committee Representing Pyidaungsu Hluttaw, and with generally inciting the people to disturb the peace and stability of the nation.

== Filmography ==
=== Film ===
- Ma Kyway Par Nae Sakura (မကြွေပါနဲ့ ဆာကူရာ)
- Oo Yae A Yoke (ဦးရဲ့အရုပ်)
- Ka Lay Toe Phay Phay (ကလေးတို့ဖေဖေ)
- Ji Yar (ဂျီယာ)
- Naung Jain (နောင်ဂျိန်)
- Yin Htae Mhar Nay Kyar Tway Pwint Nay Tal (ရင်ထဲမှာနေကြာတွေပွင့်နေတယ်)
- Ae D Lok Nae Tat Ma Lar Nae Tauk Cha Like Mal (အဲဒီလောက်နဲ့တက်မလာနဲ့တောက်ချလိုက်မယ်)
- A Chit Shi Yar A Yet (အချစ်ရှိရာအရပ်)
- Da Gar Lay Sae Htar Yone (တံခါးလေးစေ့ထားရုံ)
- Baby Yit Lone (ဘေဘီရစ်လုံး)
- Hna Lone Thar Doh Lone Chone Yar A Yet (နှလုံးသားတို့လုံခြုံရာအရပ်)
- Pwel Sar Ka Tone (ပွဲစားကတုံး)
- Nay Chin Tar Min A Narr (နေချင်တာမင်းအနား)
- Street Art
- A Phyu Yaung Lwin Pyin (အဖြူရောင် လွင်ပြင်)
- Yin Kone Than Rhythm (ရင်ခုန်သံ ရစ်သမ်)
- Thu Nge Chin Chit Thu (သူငယ်ချင်းချစ်သူ)
- Pan Yine (ပန်းရိုင်း)
- Pan Ta Pwint Shae Mhar Due Htauk Nay Tae Late Pyar (ပန်းတစ်ပွင့်ရှေ့မှာဒူးထောက်နေတဲ့လိပ်ပြာ)
- A Kyin Nar Version (အကြင်နာဗားရှင်း)
- Yee Sar Lar Gar Htar Yoot Tae Late Pyar (ရည်းစားလာဂါတာရွတ်တဲ့လိပ်ပြာ)
- Lin Ta Kaung Lone A Thone Cha Nee (လင်တစ်ကောင်လုံးအသုံးချနည်း)
- Hnin Si Kun Yet (နှင်းဆီကွန်ယက်)
- Yoke Soe Ma Lay Yae A Chit (ရုပ်ဆိုးမလေးရဲ့အချစ်)

=== Film (Cinema) ===
Lists of Films
Year	Film	Burmese tile	Co-Stars
2016	Bago Sarr Hnint Thu Ei Virus Myarr	ပဲခူးဆားနှင့်သူ၏ဗိုင်းရပ်စ်များ	Pyay Ti Oo, Yaza Ne Win, Yan Aung, Kyaw Ye Aung, Soe Myat Thuzar
2017	Devil Avengers	ရာဇဝင်ရိုင်းသူများ	Pyay Ti Oo, Myint Myat, Laila Kham
2017	Zout Kyar	ဇွတ်ကျား	Moe Aung Yin, Ye Lay, Myint Myat, Kyaw Ye Aung, Htet Aung Shine, Khine Thin Kyi, Soe Myat Thuzar, Thandar Bo, May
2017	Ngo Chang Hka Thit Ser	ငေါ့ချမ်းခသစ္စာ	Lu Min
2018	Reflection	ရောင်ပြန်	Eaindra Kyaw Zin, Wutt Hmone Shwe Yi, Htun Eaindra Bo
2019	Happy Ghost	တစ္ဆေများနှင့်ပျော်မြူးခြင်း	Myint Myat, Ei Chaw Po
2019	Kaung Kin Ta Khu A Lo Shi The	ကောင်းကင်တစ်ခုအလိုရှိသည်	Khant Sithu, Aung Ye Lin, Ei Chaw Po

== Personal life ==
Patricia was once reportedly in a relationship with actor Nay Toe, which ended after some years. In June 2017, she was in a relationship with a non-celebrity.

On her 17th birthday, Patricia donated one million Myanmar Kyat in cash, as well as food and school supplies in support of orphans living at a monastery.
