= Wyne (film director) =

Burmese filmmaker

Wyne (Own Creator)
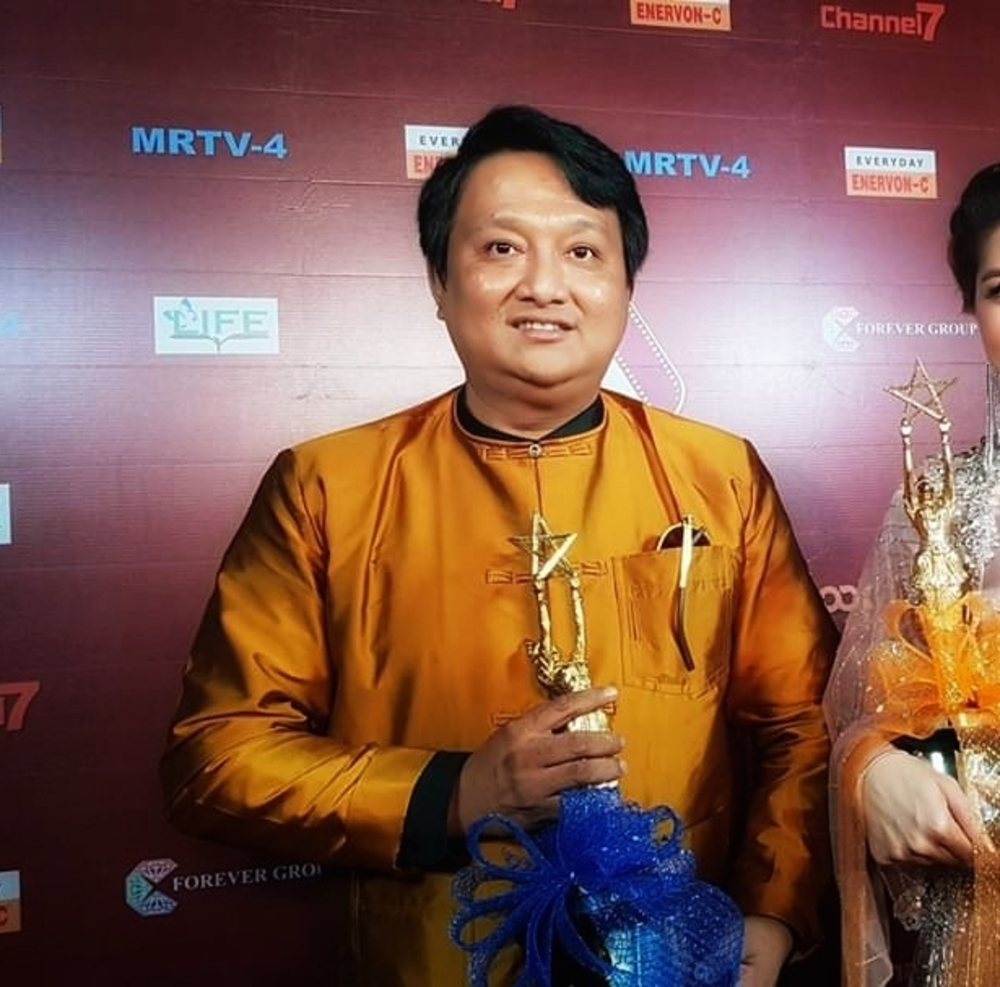
- Wyne at the 2018 Myanmar Academy Awards
- Born: Tun Zaw Win; 22 December 1973 (age 52)
- Occupations: Film director, screenwriter, actor
- Years active: 2000–present
- Children: 1
- Awards: Myanmar Academy Awards (2013, 2015, 2017, 2018)

Wyne (Own Creator) (Burmese: ဝိုင်း; born Tun Zaw Win on 22 December 1973) is a film director, screenwriter and former actor. His career began as a supporting actor in Burmese films. He gained success as a director in the early days of his career by directing music videos. He is best known for directing the short film Ban that Scene.

== Biography ==
Wyne entered the film industry immediately after completing his matriculation exams in 1991. He started his career as a supporting actor in Burmese films. Through hard work, dedication and (to a lesser extent) good looks, directors started to notice him. The first chance to be a supporting actor comes in 1995 and since then Wyne has not looked back. He appeared in various films till 2003. He also took up lessons in script writing from the age of 25 and decided to switch from being an actor to a director by the age of 30. He started with directing MTV sets for Myanmar music, become successful and eventually receive offers from movie producers to direct full-fledged films. However, his real success came in 2011 with his original film Adam, Eve and Datsa. This film lead to the starring actor and actress to be awarded in the Myanmar Motion Picture Academy Awards. The film was shown in Singapore and L.A. and was a major release in Myanmar.

On 17 February 2021, in the aftermath of the 2021 Myanmar coup d'état, authorities issued an arrest warrant for Wyne for encouraging civil servants to join ongoing civil disobedience movement, along with several other celebrities.

== Filmography ==
=== Film (Cinema) ===
Year	Title	Functioned as		
Year	Title	Director	Writer	Role
2009	Kyauk Sat Yay	Yes	No	
2011	Adam, Eve and Datsa	Yes	Yes	Himself
2012	Hna Lone Taar Abidan	Yes	Yes	Himself
2012	Red Cotton Silk Flower	Yes	No	Himself
2013	As U Like	Yes	Yes	Himself
2013	Satan's Dancer	Yes	No	
2014	Mar Yar Project	Yes	No	Himself
2014	Thet Tan Thit	Yes	Yes	
2014	Made in Heart	Yes	Yes	
2015	I'm Rose, Darling	Yes	No	Himself
2015	Slaves of Cupid	Yes	No	
2016	My Lovely Hate	Yes	Yes	
2017	Yin Bat Htae Ka Dar	Yes	Yes	
2017	Tar Tay Gyi	Yes	No	
2017	3Girls	Yes	No	
2018	Shwe Kyar	Yes	Yes	
2018	CO2	Yes	Yes	
2018	Letter to President	Yes	No	
2018	Bride	Yes	No	
2019	Palpitation in the Breeze	Yes	Yes	
2019	Kha Yay	Yes	Yes	
2019	Pa Pa Wadi See Yin Khan	Yes	Yes	
2019	Left Right Left Right	Yes		
2022	The Butterfly Trap	Yes		
2024	Mi Tin Sein	Yes		
2024	Ta Khote Ta Ya	Yes		
2025	Kantkaw Ni	Yes		
2025	Feeling	Yes		
2026	Wife Slave	Yes		

== Frequent actor collaborations ==
Years	2009	2011	2012		2013		2014			2015		2016	2017				2018				2019			
Actors	Kyauk Sat Yay	Adam, Eve and Datsa	Hna Lone Thar Abidan	Red Cotton Silk Flower	As You Like	Satan's Dancer	Mar Yar Project	Thet Tan Thit	Made in Heart	I'm Rose, Darling	Slaves of Cupid	My Lovely Hate	Yin Bat Htae Ka Dar	Tar Tay Gyi	3Girls	Nay Win Ate Tan Tat	Shwe Kyar (Golden Lotus)	CO2	Letter to President	Bride	Palpitation in the Breeze	Kha Yay	Pa Pa Wadi See Yin Khan	Total
Myint Myat	Yes																					Yes		2
Htun Eaindra Bo	Yes												Yes			Yes								3
Soe Myat Thuzar	Yes			Yes																				2
Pyay Ti Oo		Yes		Yes	Yes				Yes				Yes			Yes								6
Sai Sai Kham Leng		Yes									Yes													2
Thet Mon Myint		Yes				Yes	Yes					Yes												4
Nay Toe			Yes			Yes	Yes			Yes	Yes			Yes										6
Phway Phway			Yes	Yes			Yes	Yes		Yes	Yes				Yes		Yes	Yes	Yes	Yes	Yes		Yes	13
Yoon Yoon				Yes		Yes				Yes														3
Wutt Hmone Shwe Yi					Yes				Yes			Yes										Yes		4
Zin Wine						Yes			Yes			Yes												3
Aung Ye Lin								Yes				Yes												2
A Linn Yaung															Yes		Yes	Yes	Yes	Yes			Yes	6
Paing Phyo Thu															Yes	Yes								2
Moe Hay Ko									Yes														Yes	2
May																		Yes		Yes				2
Khin Wint Wah																					Yes			1
