= Bella Myat Thiri Lwin =

Burmese actress, model, and beauty queen

- မြတ်သီရိလွင်
- Born: Myat Thiri Lwin; 22 January 1999 (age 27); Yangon, Myanmar
- Education: Dagon University
- Occupations: Actress; Model
- Height: 1.70 m (5 ft 7 in)
- Beauty pageant titleholder
- Title: Miss World Myanmar 2016
- Years active: 2015–present
- Hair color: Black
- Eye color: Black
- Major competitions: Miss World Myanmar 2016; (Winner); Miss World 2016; (Unplaced)

Bella Myat Thiri Lwin (Burmese: ဘယ်လာ မြတ်သီရိလွင်; born Myat Thiri Lwin (မြတ်သီရိလွင်, 22 January 1999) is a Burmese actress and model. She was crowned the Miss World Myanmar 2026 and represented Myanmar at the Miss World 2016.

== Early life and education ==
Bella was born on 22 January 1999 in Yangon, Myanmar. She has one older sibling Marco Victor, a model and winner of Mister Globel 2014. She attended high school at Basic Education High School No. 2 Mayangone. She graduated from Dagon University with a degree in psychology.

== Pageantry and modeling ==
She joined Tin Moe Lwin's model training in 2015. Since then, she took professional training in modelling and catwalk. She then entered the entertainment industry and participated in many runway fashion shows. She competed in the local contest Miss Forever Gems 2015, and got first runner-up award.

=== Miss World Myanmar 2016 ===
After the competition in Miss Forever Gems 2015, she then competed in Miss World Myanmar 2016 and became the Miss World Myanmar 2016 and also won the titles for Miss Personality and Miss Popular awards. It was held on June 4, 2016, at Gandamar Grand Ballroom in Yangon.

=== Miss World 2016 ===
She represented Myanmar at the Miss World 2016 pageant which was held on 18 December 2016 at the MGM National Harbor, Washington, D.C., United States. But, she was unplaced.

== Career ==
Bella began her acting career, after the competing in Miss World 2016. She has appeared in music videos and gained popularity after acting in Ni Ni Khin Zaw's MTV "Chit Hlyat Lan Khwel". She also acted in Phyo Hylan Hein's MTV "Wutt" alongside Myint Myat. Her hard work as a model and actress in music videos was noticed by the film industry and soon, movie casting offers came rolling in.

She made her acting debut with a leading role in drama Love From The Future: Rhythm of Love, alongside Thiha Tun, aired on Channel 7 in 2017. She then starred in horror film Camera, alongside Htet Aung Shine and San Toe Naing, directed by Thar Nyi, released in 2018.

She made her big-screen debut with Jin Party where she played the main role with actors Yan Aung, Lu Min, Min Maw Kun, Yair Yint Aung, Htoo Aung, Kin Hlaing, Ko Pok, Joker, K Nyi and actresses Eaindra Kyaw Zin, Yin Latt, Shwe Eain Si which screened in Myanmar cinemas on 22 August 2019.

== Brand ambassadorships ==
After winning the Miss World Myanmar 2016, she was appointed as a brand ambassador for AirAsia. In 2017, she was appointed as a brand ambassador for Best-T toothpaste, together with Sai Sai Kham Leng and Han Lay.

== Filmography ==
=== Film ===
- Camera (2018)

=== Film (Cinema) ===
Year	Film	Burmese title	Note
2019	Jin Party	ဂျင်ပါတီ	

=== Television series ===
Year	English title	Myanmar title	Network	Notes
2017	Love From The Future: Rhythm of Love	အနာဂတ်ချစ်သူ	Channel 7	
