= The Butterfly Trap =

2022 Burmese drama film

- Poster
- Burmese: လိပ်ပြာထောင်ခြောက်
- Directed by: Wyne
- Screenplay by: Nay Naw
- Story by: Nay Naw
- Starring: Pyay Ti Oo; Phway Phway
- Cinematography: Kyauk Phyu; Nay Win
- Edited by: Kyi Thar
- Production company: Thet Tant Eain Film Production
- Release date: April 29, 2022 (Myanmar)
- Running time: 122 minutes
- Country: Myanmar
- Language: Burmese

The Butterfly Trap (Burmese: လိပ်ပြာထောင်ခြောက်) is a 2022 Burmese thriller film, directed by Wyne starring Pyay Ti Oo and Phway Phway. It was produced by Thet Thant Eain Film Production and premiered in Myanmar on April 29, 2022.

== Plot ==
Han Thar Myat is the CEO of Dream Dealer Company Limited and the Chairman of the "May the Fruits of Good Deeds Be Reaped" (တူသောအကျိုးပေးပါစေ) Foundation. Kyi Thar Moe Pwint is a senior reporter and presenter at Snap Media. Kyi Thar Moe Pwint accidentally picked up Han Thar Myat’s phone and became suspicious because of the pictures of the murder on the phone. Han Thar Myat called and returned the phone. Kyi Thar Moe Pwint said that if he wanted to repay her, he would have to give her an interview. Kyi Thar Moe Pwint has two friends, Aung Kaung Thit and Devi. Aung Kaung Thit has a crush on Kyi Tha Moe Pwint. At first, Kyi Thar Moe Pwint was suspicious of Han Thar Myat, but Aung Kaung Thit said that as far as he could tell, the man was a good person and had done nothing wrong. The only thing that could be said to be wrong is that the death of Han Thar Myat’s secretary, Yoon Nadi, was probably related to Han Thar Myat, according to Aung Kaung Thit. Kyi Thar Moe Pwint interviewed Han Thar Myat about the company and the foundation, and when she asked him if Han Thar Myat had any involvement in Yoon Nadi's death, Han Thar Myat's eyes widened and said that it was not because of his involvement. Kyi Thar Moe Pwint stopped asking, saying that the interview had already ended, and that the things she had asked about were not recorded and would not be published in the journal.

One day, while Kyi Thar Moe Pwint was interviewing shoppers at shopping mall, Han Thar Myat met Kyi Thar Moe Pwint and took her to visit his house. When she arrived at his house, Han Thar Myat showed her one of his warehouses, where Kyi Thar Moe Pwint saw butterflies in bottles and hanging at the entrance. She continued to see a girl with bloody wounds and a girl who had fallen on top of her, bleeding to death, and then she lost consciousness. When she woke up, she watched the videos she had recorded on her phone and saw Han Thar Myat anxiously taking her to the hospital and telling the doctor to make her recover quickly. When U Han Thar Myat returned to the hospital, he said that he had seen the bloody scene and that this happened. Kyi Thar Moe Pwint said that it was not because of the scene, but because he himself had a weak heart. Kyi Thar Moe Pwint gained some trust due to Han Thar Myat's care.

Later, Kyi Thar Moe Pwint became Han Thar Myat's girlfriend. After they became lovers, Han Thar Myat kept Kyi Thar Moe Pwint under his control without letting her go. Han Thar Myat would torture Kyi Thar Moe Pwint if she disappeared from his sight for a long time. Finally, Kyi Thar Moe Pwint escaped, but she was arrested again. Aung Kaung Thit called the police to Han Thar Myat's house and saying that a girl was being held captive in the house, but Han Thar Myat had his disciples aim Kyi Thar Moe Pwint in the back and tell her that nothing would happen to her, so the police left. In the end, Kyi Thar Moe Pwint fought Han Thar Myat and was freed, while Han Thar Myat continued to live a life of madness in prison.

== Cast ==
- Pyay Ti Oo as Han Thar Myat
- Phway Phway as Kyi Thar Moe Pwint
- Kaung Sett Htoo as Aung Kaung Thit
- Moe Angel as Devi
- May Panchi as Yoon Nadi Kyaw
- May as guest appearance

== Awards and nominations ==
Year	Award	Category	Nominee	Result	Ref
2022	Myanmar Academy Awards	Best Actor	Pyay Ti Oo	Won	
