= Shwe Eain Si =

Burmese actress, model and beauty queen

- ရွှေအိမ်စည်
- Born: Shwe Eain Si; 25 October 1998 (age 27); Naypyidaw, Myanmar
- Occupations: Actress; model; beauty queen
- Height: 1.73 m (5 ft 8 in)
- Beauty pageant titleholder
- Title: Miss Universe Myanmar 2017 (1st Runner-Up); Miss Grand Myanmar 2017 (Dethroned); Miss Supranational Myanmar 2018
- Years active: 2016–present
- Hair color: Dark
- Eye color: Brown
- Major competitions: Miss Supranational Myanmar 2018 (Winner); Miss Supranational 2018 (Top 21)

Shwe Eain Si (Burmese: ရွှေအိမ်စည်; born 25 October 1998) is a Burmese actress, model and beauty pageant title holder. She was crowned Miss Golden Land Myanmar 2018 and represented Myanmar at the Miss Supranational 2018, which was held in Poland.

She was crowned Miss Grand Myanmar in 2017, but her pageant title was revoked after her confrontation with the national director during which she was claimed to have used profanity. Additionally, she posted a video online of her blaming the Arakan Rohingya Salvation Army (ARSA) for ethnic violence in Rakhine State.

== Biography ==
Shwe Eain Si was born on 25 October 1998 in Naypyidaw, Myanmar. At age 12, she moved to London. She attended Epsom and Ewell High School which was located in Ewell east, Surrey, London. After having spent a few years in it, she then attended Rosebery School for Girls which has good stats and the highest achievers within the London area. Both schools are government-funded and not independent schools attended by wealthy children.

== Pageantry ==
=== Miss World Myanmar ===
Shwe Eain Si joined the Miss World Myanmar 2016. It was held on June 4, 2016, at Gandamar Grand Ballroom in Yangon. She was placed in the top 5.

=== Miss Universe Myanmar 2017 ===
She competed in the Miss Universe Myanmar 2017 which was held on 6 October 2016 at Novotel Hotels and Resorts, Yangon, Myanmar. At the end of the event, she was placed 1st runner-up and won the continental titles for Miss Beautiful Hair, Best National Costumes Award and Miss Body Perfect Award.

However, she was stripped of her pageant title after she posted a video online blaming the Arakan Rohingya Salvation Army for ethnic violence in Rakhine State.

=== Miss Golden Land Myanmar 2018 ===
She joined Miss Golden Land Myanmar which was held in the Grand Ballroom of Taw Win Garden Hotel, in Yangon on 14 August 2018. At the end of the event, she was crowned Miss Supranational Myanmar 2018 and represented Myanmar at Miss Supranational 2018.

=== Miss Supranational 2018 ===
She represented Myanmar at the Miss Supranational 2018 pageant which was held in Krynica-Zdrój, Poland. She was placed in the top 21.

=== Take on Military Coup ===
Early in her career, she attracted considerable media attention and gained a large fan base due to her outspoken personality. She was well-known for her advocacy against mistreatment within the pageant world and other social injustices.

However, many fans expressed disappointment at her silence regarding the military coup that occurred on February 1, 2021, and the atrocities committed by the military against unarmed protesters. Public discontent grew further when her brother used a media platform to identify himself as a staunch supporter of the military, defending its actions and accusing civilians of rejecting the military's efforts on behalf of the country.

== Acting career ==
Shwe Eain Si started her acting career in 2017. She made her acting debut with the film Tin String with actors Phyo Ngwe Soe, Eaindra Kyaw Zin, Ye Naung and Aung Yell Htwe.

In 2019, she played the leading role in the Burmese big screen film The Naked Ghost directed by Pwint Theingi Zaw. The same year, she starred in the film "Jin Party" alongside Yan Aung, Lu Min, Min Maw Kun, Ye Yint Aung, Htoo Aung, Eaindra Kyaw Zin.

== Filmography ==
List of films
| Year | Title | Director | Co-Stars | Role |
|---|---|---|---|---|
| 2019 | The Naked Ghost | Pwint Theingi Zaw | | |
| 2019 | Tin String | Arkar | Phyo Ngwe Soe, Eaindra Kyaw Zin | |
| 2019 | Jin Party | | Yan Aung, Lu Min, Min Maw Kun, Ye Yint Aung, Htoo Aung, Eaindra Kyaw Zin, Yin Latt, Bella, Kin Hlaing, Ko Pok, Joker and K Nyi | |
| TBA | Lu Gyi Lu Kaung | Pyi Hein Thi Ha | Htet Htet Htun, Sis Yun Wady Oo, Yunn Wint Hlwar Aung, Lwin Moe, Lu Min (actor), Pyay Ti Oo, Nay Toe, Soe Myat Thuzar | |
| TBA | Three | Pyi Hein Thiha | Gone Pone, Htet Htet Htun, Maeya Sunsun, Nang Khin Zay Yar, Myint Myat | |
| TBA | Maryar Rahtarr maunggtae meinma | | Ye Yint Aung, Htet Htet Moe Oo, Ei Chaw Po, Nan Su Oo | |

== Personal life ==
Shwe Eain Si has been in a relationship with businessman Aye Ne Win since 2017. They are referred to as 'nationalist power couple' for supporting the anti-Rohingya movement in Myanmar.
