= ZYH =

ZYH may refer to:

- Zay Ye Htet, Burmese actor, model and producer
- Den Haag Centraal railway station, The Hague, Netherlands, IATA code
- Zhaoyuan County, Heilongjiang Province, China, division code
