= Satan's Dancer =

2013 Burmese film

- film poster
- Burmese: စေတန်ရဲ့ကချေသည်
- Directed by: Wyne
- Screenplay by: Wyne
- Based on: Satan's Dancer by Ponnya Khin
- Produced by: Ko Soe Than
- Starring: Nay Toe; Thet Mon Myint; Heavy Phyo; Yoon Yoon
- Cinematography: Ko Toe Win
- Edited by: Kyaw Khaing Soe
- Music by: Diramore
- Production company: Dawei Film Production
- Release date: March 2, 2013
- Running time: 120 minutes
- Country: Myanmar
- Language: Burmese

Satan's Dancer (Burmese: စေတန်ရဲ့ကချေသည်) is a 2013 Burmese drama film, directed by Wyne starring Nay Toe, Thet Mon Myint, Heavy Phyo and Yoon Yoon. The film, produced by Dawei Film Production premiered Myanmar on March 2, 2013.

== Cast ==
=== Main cast ===
- Nay Toe as Yaw Min
- Thet Mon Myint as Kyway Yote
- Heavy Phyo as Young Yaw Min, childhood life of Yaw Min
- Yoon Yoon as Young Kyway Yote, childhood life of Kyway Yote
- Zin Wine as U Htun

=== Guest cast ===
- Yan Aung
- Soe Moe Kyi

== Award ==
| Year | Award | Category | Nominee | Result |
|---|---|---|---|---|
| 2013 | Myanmar Motion Picture Academy Awards | Best Director | Wyne | Won |
