= Shwe Kyar =

2018 Burmese drama film

- Film poster
- Burmese: ရွှေကြာ
- Directed by: Wyne
- Written by: Wyne
- Based on: A Shay Takhar A Win by Ponnya Khin
- Produced by: Lay Thandar Myint
- Starring: A Linn Yaung; Phway Phway; Thinzar Wint Kyaw
- Edited by: Kyaw Khaing Soe
- Production company: Ngwe Thawtar Film Production
- Release date: March 16, 2018
- Running time: 120 minutes
- Country: Myanmar
- Language: Burmese

Shwe Kyar (Burmese: ရွှေကြာ, lit. 'Golden Lotus') is a 2018 Burmese drama film starring A Linn Yaung, Phway Phway and Thinzar Wint Kyaw. The film produced by Ngwe Thawtar Film Production premiered in Myanmar on March 16, 2018.

== Synopsis ==
Thatoe Theik is a documentary-maker working on a film about the illegal Myanmar prostitution industry. He meets Shwe Kyar, his childhood friend – but each are so changed, at first neither realize this.

== Cast ==
- Phway Phway as Shwe Kyar
- A Linn Yaung as Thatoe Thike
- Thinzar Wint Kyaw as San Htar Nyo

== Award ==
Year	Award	Category	Nominee	Result
2018	Myanmar Motion Picture Academy Awards	Best Picture	Shwe Kyar	Won
2018	Myanmar Motion Picture Academy Awards	Best Screenplay	Wyne	Won
2018	Myanmar Motion Picture Academy Awards	Best Actress	Phway Phway	Won
2018	Myanmar Motion Picture Academy Awards	Best Editing	Kyaw Khaing Soe	Won
