= May (actress) =

Burmese actress, model and singer

- မေ
- Born: May Thu Aung; 2 May 1991 (age 35); Yangon, Myanmar
- Education: University of Distance Education, Yangon
- Occupations: Actress; model; singer
- Years active: 2007–present
- Height: 5 ft 6 in (1.68 m)
- Relatives: Thuzar Wint Lwin (sister)
- Awards: Star Awards 2018 (Best Theme Song Award)
- Musical career
- Genres: Pop
- Instruments: Vocals

May Thu Aung (မေသူအောင်; born 2 May 1991), known professionally as simply May (Burmese: မေ), is a Burmese actress, singer, and model. May won the Best Theme Song Award at the 2018 Star Awards for her work in the film Chu Si.

== Early life and education ==
May was born on 2 May 1991 in Yangon, Myanmar. She is the middle child among three siblings, having an older brother and younger sister. She attended high school at Basic Education High School No. 2 Lanmadaw. She graduated from University of Distance Education, Yangon with a degree in English in 2011.

== Career ==
=== 2007–2010: Pageantry and acting debut ===
In December 2007, May competed in the Miss Now How 2007 pageant and placed as the 1st runner-up. In 2008, she competed in the Miss Kose 2008 pageant and became the 1st runner-up and won the tile Miss People 2008. In 2009, she entered the film industry and debuted as an actress in the film Tain Tway Thwar Tae Lan alongside senior actors Ye Deight, Htun Eaindra Bo and May Thinzar Oo in 2010. She then starred in the film Lu Zaw, alongside Ye Deight, Zin Wine, Soe Myat Thuzar and Sandy Myint Lwin.

=== 2011–2017: Breaking into the big screen and recognition ===
She then made her big-screen debut in the film Daddy Ka Main Ka Lay where she played the main role with Min Maw Kun, Hat Kat, and Phway Phway, which screened in Myanmar cinemas in 2011. From 2011 to 2013, she has temporary retirement from the entertainment industry due to health problems. In 2015, she played a supporting role in comedy film Bhone Ka Nyar Hna Par, which screened in Myanmar cinemas on 21 July 2017. After this film, she starred in comedy film Zoot Kyar where she played the main role with Kyaw Ye Aung, Myint Myat, Moe Aung Yin, Ye Lay, Htet Aung Shine, Khine Thin Kyi, Thandar Bo and Patricia, which screened in Myanmar cinemas on 29 September 2017 and processed huge hit and successes.

=== 2018–present: Rising popularity ===
In 2018, she portrayed one of the female leads in the film Chu Si alongside Kyaw Htet Aung, Melody, Ei Chaw Po, Aye Myat Thu, and Nan Su Oo, which premiered in Myanmar cinemas on 14 September 2018. The same year, she co-starred with A Linn Yaung and Phway Phway in the horror film Tadotamee (The Bride), which premiered in Myanmar cinemas on 28 December 2018 and was a commercial success. Her portrayal of the character earned praised by fans for her acting performance and character interpretation, and experienced a resurgence of popularity.

== Music career ==
May started singing in 2009 and participated in thingyan group album "April Queens". A song from that album, "Ar Koe Mal Naw" which became one of the all-time hit in her career. She released her debut solo album "Marry Me?" on 23 February 2017 which was officially distributed to all parts of Myanmar. She made the theme song "Myat Nar Phone Myar" (The Masks) for the film Chu Si together with May Kyi, which won the Best Theme Song Award at the 2018 Star Awards.

May released a lot of single songs "Min Ko Chit Loh" in 2018, "Kyal" (Star), and "Lost" in 2019, "Good Bye" in 2020.

== Political activities ==
Following the 2021 Myanmar coup d'état, May was active in the anti-coup movement both in person at rallies and through social media. Denouncing the military coup, she has taken part in protests since February. She joined the "We Want Justice" three-finger salute movement. The movement was launched on social media, and many celebrities have joined the movement.

On 4 April 2021, warrants for her arrest were issued under section 505 (a) of the penal code by the State Administration Council for speaking out against the military coup. Along with several other celebrities, she was charged with calling for participation in the Civil Disobedience Movement (CDM) and damaging the state's ability to govern, with supporting the Committee Representing Pyidaungsu Hluttaw, and with generally inciting the people to disturb the peace and stability of the nation.

== Filmography ==
=== Film ===
- Tain Tway Thwar Tae Lan (တိမ်တွေသွားတဲ့လမ်း) (2010)
- Lu Zaw (လူဇော်) (2010)

=== Film (Cinema) ===
Year	Film	Burmese title	Note
2011	Daddy Ka Main Ka Lay	ဒယ်ဒီကမိန်းကလေး	
2017	Bhone Ka Nyar Hna Par'	ဘုန်းကညာနှစ်ပါး	
2017	Zoot Kyar	ဇွတ်ကျား	
2018	Chu Si	ချူဆီ	
2018	Bride	သတို့သမီး	
TBA	Pone Yeik	ပုံရိပ်	
TBA	Memories of Tomorrow		
TBA	Tatiya Htet Bel Bat A Khan	တတိယထပ်ဘယ်ဘက်အခန်း	
TBA	Promise	ကတိ	

== Discography ==
=== Solo album ===
- Marry Me (2017)
- Htwet Pauk (The Exit) (2025)

=== Singles ===
- Min Ko Chit Loh (2018)
- Kyal (2019)
- Lost (2019)
- Good Bye (2020)
- Phyay Par Baby (2020)
- A Tate Mae Yaw Gar (2021)
- A Yan Lwan Nay P(2022)
- Htwat Pauk (2025)

== Awards and nominations ==
Year	Award	Category	Nominated work	Result
2018	Star Awards	Best Theme Song Award	Chu Si	Won
