= CO2 (film) =

2018 Burmese horror film

CO_{2}
- Burmese: ကာဗွန်ဒိုင်အောက်ဆိုဒ်
- Directed by: Wyne
- Screenplay by: Wyne
- Based on: CO_{2} by Mi Mi
- Produced by: Ko Soe Than
- Starring: A Linn Yaung; Phway Phway; Kyaw Htet Aung; Yadanar Bo
- Production company: Dawei Film Production
- Release date: July 27, 2018
- Running time: 120 minutes
- Country: Myanmar
- Language: Burmese

CO_{2} (Burmese: ကာဗွန်ဒိုင်အောက်ဆိုဒ်) is a 2018 Burmese horror film based on a novel by Mi Mi. The film stars A Linn Yaung, Phway Phway, Kyaw Htet Aung and Yadanar Bo. The film produced by Dawei Film Production premiered in Myanmar on July 27, 2018.

== Cast ==
- A Linn Yaung as Naung Naung
- Phway Phway as Thar Yar
- Kyaw Htet Aung as Arkar Soe Moe
- Yadanar Bo as Pone Pone
