= Online Paw Ka Wit Nyin =

2015 Burmese film

- Film Poster
- Burmese: Online ပေါ်ကဝိညာဉ်
- Directed by: Nyi Nyi Htun Lwin
- Screenplay by: Lwin Min Eant
- Produced by: Tin Zar Paing
- Starring: Nay Toe; Phway Phway; Zay Ye Htet; Chan Mi Mi Ko
- Cinematography: Tin San; Aung Saw Oo
- Edited by: Kyaw Khine Soe
- Production company: Lavender Film Production
- Release date: January 30, 2015 (Myanmar)
- Running time: 145 minutes
- Country: Myanmar
- Language: Burmese

Online Paw Ka Wit Nyin (Burmese: Online ပေါ်ကဝိညာဉ်) is a 2015 Burmese romantic horror film, directed by Nyi Nyi Htun Lwin starring Nay Toe, Phway Phway, Zay Ye Htet and Chan Mi Mi Ko. The film, produced by Lavender Film Production premiered in Myanmar on January 30, 2015.

== Cast ==
- Nay Toe as Soe Shein Thar
- Phway Phway as Shin Min Sett
- Zay Ye Htet as Khant Lu
- Chan Mi Mi Ko as Than Zin Tay
- Aung Lwin as Uncle San
