= The Storm That Kissed Me =

2018 Burmese drama film

- Film Poster
- Burmese: ငါ့ကိုနမ်းတဲ့မုန်တိုင်း
- Directed by: Aung Zaw Lin; Win Lwin Htet
- Screenplay by: Moe Ni Lwin
- Story by: Nyayy
- Starring: Hlwan Paing; Yair Yint Aung; Phway Phway
- Cinematography: Nay Winn; Mike Tyson; Ar Noe
- Edited by: Thaw Zin; Thandar Ko Ko; May Barani
- Music by: Wai La; Thar Dee Lu; Hlwan Paing; Ko Htet
- Production company: Bo Bo Film Production
- Release date: June 1, 2018 (Myanmar)
- Running time: 120 minutes
- Country: Myanmar
- Language: Burmese

The Storm That Kissed Me (Burmese: ငါ့ကိုနမ်းတဲ့မုန်တိုင်း) is a 2018 Burmese drama film, directed by Aung Zaw Lin and Win Lwin Htet starring Hlwan Paing, Yair Yint Aung and Phway Phway. The film, produced by Bo Bo Film Production, premiered in Myanmar on June 1, 2018.

== Cast ==
- Hlwan Paing as Nay Nyo Thwin
- Yair Yint Aung as Aww Ra Htoo
- Phway Phway as Wint Shin Pyo
- Nay Aung as U Aung
- Ye Aung as U Htoo Aung
- Myat Kay Thi Aung as Mother of Wint Shin Pyo
