= Mar Yar Project =

2014 Burmese film

- film poster
- Burmese: မာယာပရောဂျက်
- Directed by: Wyne
- Screenplay by: Thiha Soe
- Based on: Mar Yar Project by Lun Htar Htar
- Starring: Nay Toe; Thet Mon Myint; Phway Phway
- Cinematography: Ko Toe Win
- Edited by: Kyaw Khine Soe
- Music by: Khin Maung Gyi
- Production company: Moe Kaung Kin Film Production
- Release date: March 14, 2014
- Running time: 120 minutes
- Country: Myanmar
- Language: Burmese

Mar Yar Project (Burmese: မာယာပရောဂျက်) is a 2014 Burmese drama film, directed by Wyne starring Nay Toe, Thet Mon Myint and Phway Phway. The film, produced by Moe Kaung Kin Film Production premiered Myanmar on March 14, 2014.

== Cast ==
- Nay Toe as Linn Lu Lin
- Thet Mon Myint as Moe Kyo May
- Phway Phway as Swae Nhyoe Shin
- Kyaw Kyaw as Moe Thet Tant
