= Bride (film) =

2018 Burmese film

- Film Poster
- Burmese: သတို့သမီး
- Directed by: Wyne
- Screenplay by: Mee Mee
- Based on: Bride by Mee Mee
- Starring: A Linn Yaung; Phway Phway; May
- Cinematography: Kyauk Phyu
- Edited by: Kyaw Khaing Soe
- Production company: Dawei Film Production
- Release date: December 28, 2018 (Myanmar)
- Running time: 113 minutes
- Country: Myanmar
- Language: Burmese

Bride (Burmese: သတို့သမီး) is a 2018 Burmese horror film, directed by Wyne starring A Linn Yaung, Phway Phway and May. The film, produced by Dawei Film Production premiered in Myanmar on December 28, 2018.

== Cast ==
- A Linn Yaung as Zarni Htike
- Phway Phway as Thaw Tar
- May as Su Myat, the ghost
- Zin Myo as Htin Aung
