= Letter to President =

2018 Burmese film

- official film poster
- Burmese: သမ္မတကြီးထံပေးစာ
- Directed by: Wyne
- Screenplay by: Nay Naw
- Story by: Lu Nay
- Starring: A Linn Yaung; Phway Phway; Chan Min Ye Htut; May Sue Maung
- Production company: Sein Htay Film Production
- Release date: October 19, 2018
- Running time: 120 minutes
- Country: Myanmar
- Language: Burmese

Letter to President (Burmese: သမ္မတကြီးထံပေးစာ) is a 2018 Burmese drama film, directed by Wyne starring A Linn Yaung, Phway Phway, Chan Min Ye Htut and May Sue Maung. The film, produced by Sein Htay Film Production premiered Myanmar on October 19, 2018.

== Cast ==
- A Linn Yaung as Aung Kyaw
- Phway Phway as Khat Khat Khaing
- Chan Min Ye Htut as John
- May Sue Maung
