= Chu Si =

2018 Burmese film

- film poster
- Burmese: ချူဆီ
- Directed by: Min Oo
- Screenplay by: Moe Ni Lwin
- Story by: Su Maung Maung
- Produced by: Aung Khit Min
- Starring: Kyaw Htet Aung; Melody; Aye Myat Thu; Ei Chaw Po; May; Nan Su Oo; Soe Moe Kyi
- Production company: Aung Khit Min Film Production
- Release date: September 14, 2018
- Running time: 120 minutes
- Country: Myanmar
- Language: Burmese

Chu Si (Burmese: ချူဆီ) is a 2018 Burmese drama film, directed by Min Oo starring Kyaw Htet Aung, Melody, Aye Myat Thu, Ei Chaw Po, May, Nan Su Oo and Soe Moe Kyi. The film, produced by Aung Khit Min Film Production premiered in Myanmar on September 14, 2018.

== Cast ==
- Kyaw Htet Aung as Lin Oo Maung
- Melody as Saw Kay Thi
- Aye Myat Thu as Ma Htet
- Ei Chaw Po as Myat Noe
- May as Esther
- Nan Su Oo as Htike Htike
- Soe Moe Kyi as Ma Ma Nan
