= Jin Party =

- Burmese: ဂျင်ပါတီ
- Directed by: Yazawin Ko
- Screenplay by: Yazawin Ko; Thet Oo Maung
- Produced by: Bo Bo Film Production
- Starring: Yan Aung; Min Maw Kun; Yair Yint Aung; Khin Hlaing; Htoo Aung; Eaindra Kyaw Zin; Yin Let; Shwe Eain Si
- Release date: August 22, 2019
- Country: Myanmar
- Language: Burmese

Jin Party (Burmese: ဂျင်ပါတီ) is a 2019 Burmese comedy film, directed by Yarzawin Ko starring Yan Aung, Min Maw Kun, Khin Hlaing, Yair Yint Aung, Htoo Aung, Eaindra Kyaw Zin, Yin Let, Shwe Eain Si, Bella Myat Thiri Lwin. The film, produced by Bo Bo Film Production premiered in Myanmar on August 22, 2019.

== Cast ==
- Yan Aung as Moe Lin Soe
- Lu Min as Let Yone
- Min Maw Kun as Kyaw Su
- Yair Yint Aung as Yoe Yar
- Htoo Aung as Bala
- Khin Hlaing as Myo Win Soe
- Eaindra Kyaw Zin as Sabal Phyu
- Shwe Eain Si as Mary
- Yin Let as Dar Dar
- Bella Myat Thiri Lwin as Ngwe Thoon
