= Palpitation in the Breeze =

2019 Burmese film

- Film Poster
- Burmese: လှပ်၍လွင့်သော
- Directed by: Wyne
- Screenplay by: Wyne
- Based on: Hlatt Ywae Lwint Thaw Kabar by Sabal Phyu Nu
- Produced by: Khayan Pyar
- Starring: Moht Moht Myint Aung; Phway Phway; Khin Wint Wah; Kyaw Ye Aung
- Production company: Khayay Phyu Film Production
- Release date: March 22, 2019 (Myanmar)
- Running time: 120 minutes
- Country: Myanmar
- Language: Burmese

Palpitation in the Breeze (Burmese: လှပ်၍လွင့်သော) is a 2019 Burmese drama film, directed by Wyne starring Moht Moht Myint Aung, Phway Phway, Khin Wint Wah and Kyaw Ye Aung. The film, produced by Khayay Phyu Film Production premiered in Myanmar on March 22, 2019.

== Cast ==
- Moht Moht Myint Aung as Daw Kyi Pyar
- Khin Wint Wah as Kyi Pyar
- Phway Phway as Khin Nyein Chan
- Kyaw Ye Aung as U Maung Pyay
- Nine Nine Htet as Tayar
