= Yin Bat Htae Ka Dar =

2017 Burmese drama film

- Film poster
- Burmese: ရင်ဘတ်ထဲကဓား
- Directed by: Wyne
- Screenplay by: Wyne
- Based on: A Mhaung Htae Mar by Lamin Mo Mo
- Produced by: Kha Yan Pyar
- Starring: Pyay Ti Oo; Eaindra Kyaw Zin; Htun Eaindra Bo
- Production company: Khayay Phyu Film Production
- Release date: October 27, 2017
- Running time: 120 minutes
- Country: Myanmar
- Language: Burmese

Yin Bat Htae Ka Dar (Burmese: ရင်ဘတ်ထဲကဓား lit. 'A Knife in the Heart') is a 2017 Burmese drama film starring Pyay Ti Oo, Eaindra Kyaw Zin and Htun Eaindra Bo. The film produced by Khayay Phyu Film Production premiered in Myanmar on October 27, 2017.

== Cast ==
- Pyay Ti Oo as Thiha Naing
- Eaindra Kyaw Zin as La Yake Way
- Htun Eaindra Bo as Mya Mya, mother of La Yake Way
- Myat Kay Thi Aung as Ma Kyu
- Nwet Nwet San as Aunty San
- Than Than Soe as Ma Yee
- May Kabyar as Chu

== Award and nominations ==
Year	Award	Category	Nominee	Result
2017	Myanmar Motion Picture Academy Awards	Best Screenplay	Wyne	Won
2017	Myanmar Motion Picture Academy Awards	Best Director	Wyne	Nominated
2017	Myanmar Motion Picture Academy Awards	Best Picture	Kha Yay Phyu Film Production	Nominated
2017	Myanmar Motion Picture Academy Awards	Best Supporting Actress	Myat Kay Thi Aung	Nominated
2017	Myanmar Motion Picture Academy Awards	Best Actor	Pyay Ti Oo	Nominated
2017	Myanmar Motion Picture Academy Awards	Best Actress	Eaindra Kyaw Zin	Won
