= Kyway =

- Burmese: ကြွေ
- Directed by: Thar Nyi
- Written by: Min Lu
- Produced by: Bo Bo Film Production
- Starring: Hlwan Paing; Ei Chaw Po; Tyron Bejay; Ye Aung; Soe Myat Thuzar
- Edited by: Thar Nyi
- Music by: Hlwan Paing
- Release date: 20 July 2018
- Country: Myanmar
- Language: Burmese

Kyway (ကြွေ) is a 2018 Burmese drama film produced by Bo Bo Film Production. The film was based on the novel Pyaw Tine Yone Tak Pote Thin Nyo by Min Lu and directed by Thar Nyi. In this film, starred Myanmar movie stars, Hlwan Paing, Ei Chaw Po, Tyron Bejay, Ye Aung, Soe Myat Thuzar. The film was produced by Bo Bo Film Production and which screened in Myanmar cinemas on 20 July 2018.

== Cast ==
- Hlwan Paing as Nay Min Maung
- Ei Chaw Po as Khin Yin Tin
- Tyron Bejay as Soe Htet (main villain)
- Ye Aung
- Soe Myat Thuzar
