= I'm Rose, Darling =

2015 Burmese film

- I'm Rose Darling Myanmar film poster
- Burmese: ကျွန်မက နှင်းဆီပါ မောင်
- Directed by: Wyne
- Based on: I'm Rose, Darling by Ponnya Khin
- Starring: Nay Toe; Phway Phway; Yoon Yoon; Heavy Phyo
- Release date: 2015
- Country: Myanmar
- Language: Burmese

I'm Rose, Darling (Burmese: ကျွန်မက နှင်းဆီပါ မောင်) is a 2015 Burmese drama film directed by Wyne and starring Nay Toe and Phway Phway. It is one of the films that reached the highest-grossing film in Myanmar. This film was achieved Best Actress and Best Director Awards at Myanmar Motion Picture Academy Awards.

== Plot ==
Khune Tha (Nay Toe) lives with his grandfather at Htar Thakhin 's (Phway Phway) House in Pyinoolwin as a housekeeper after his father died.

Htar Thakhin visited her house in Pyinoolwin and met with Khune Tha for the first time in her young age. She bullies on Khune Tha in all kind of ways from childhood to adulthood. Khune Tha is patient with her due to his grandfather's advice. A few years later the fortune of Htar Thakhin has turned. Her father was dead and she lost all of her properties because of her grandmother. Since she is a naughty person she cannot communicate with others. By chance her roommate at a hostel introduced her to a job at shoes sale counter.

Khune Tha comes to Yangon, works hard and become a millionaire by chance. One day, Khune Tha accidentally meets Htar Thakhin at shopping mall where she works and Khune Tha has a plan to revenge on her, but instead it becomes a love story.

== Main cast ==
- Nay Toe as Khune Tha
- Phway Phway as Htar Thakhin
- Heavy Phyo as Young Khune Tha, childhood life of Khune Tha
- Yoon Yoon as Young Htar Thakhin, childhood life of Htar Takhin

== Awards ==
Myanmar Times reported the film as a "box office hit".

- 2015, Myanmar Motion Picture Academy Awards 'Best Female Lead Actress' award for – Phway Phway
- 2015, Myanmar Motion Picture Academy Awards 'Best Director' award for Wyne (film director)

== Production ==
Thet Mon Myint was the first planned actress in this movie. She refused to act in the kiss scene (an addition to the plot by the director) due to cultural reservations. Phway Phway was replaced in Thet Mon Myint. Although there were a lot of media attacks against Phway Phway she managed to make the film.

This film had problems before recording and also during showing time.
