= Kat Pi Ya =

2017 Burmese film

- Film Poster
- Burmese: ကပ္ပိယ
- Directed by: Ko Zaw (Ar Yone Oo)
- Screenplay by: Nay Soe Thaw
- Based on: Kat Pi Ya by Khin Khin Htoo
- Produced by: Khayan Pyar
- Starring: Pyay Ti Oo; Phway Phway; Kaung Pyae
- Production company: Khayay Phyu Film Production
- Release date: June 30, 2017 (Myanmar)
- Running time: 117 minutes
- Country: Myanmar
- Language: Burmese

Kat Pi Ya (Burmese: ကပ္ပိယ) is a 2017 Burmese drama film, directed by Ko Zaw (Ar Yone Oo) starring Pyay Ti Oo, Phway Phway, Kaung Pyae. The film, produced by Khayay Phyu Film Production premiered in Myanmar on June 30, 2017.

== Cast ==
- Pyay Ti Oo as San Hla Baw
- Phway Phway as Mya Chit
- Kaung Pyae as Aung Than Kyaw
- Moe Di as The Monk
- War War Aung as Daw Aye Mal
- Thi Yati as Aye Thi
- Zwe Lay (child actor) as Kauk Swa
