= A Thet Ko A Thet Htet Po Ywae Chit The =

2015 Burmese film

- Film Poster
- Burmese: အသက်ကိုအသက်ထက်ပို၍ချစ်သည်
- Directed by: Ko Zaw (Ar Yone Oo)
- Screenplay by: Nay Soe Thaw
- Based on: A Thet Ko A Thet Htet Po Ywae Chit The by Swe Swe Aung
- Starring: Aung Ye Lin; Phway Phway; Thar Nyi; San Htut; Soe Myat Thuzar; Khine Hnin Wai; May Kabyar
- Production company: Shwe Taung Film Production
- Release date: September 25, 2015 (Myanmar)
- Running time: 113 minutes
- Country: Myanmar
- Language: Burmese

A Thet Ko A Thet Htet Po Ywae Chit The (Burmese: အသက်ကိုအသက်ထက်ပို၍ချစ်သည်, lit. 'I Love A Thet More Than Life') is a 2015 Burmese drama film, directed by Ko Zaw (Ar Yone Oo) starring Aung Ye Lin, Phway Phway, Thar Nyi, San Htut, Soe Myat Thuzar, Khine Hnin Wai and May Kabyar. The film, produced by Shwe Taung Film Production premiered in Myanmar on September 25, 2015.

== Cast ==
- Aung Ye Lin as Moe Myint Phyu
- Phway Phway as May Thet Maung
- Thar Nyi as Nyein Maung
- San Htut as Tin Maung Lay
- Soe Myat Thuzar as Daw Htar Shein
- Wah Wah Aung as Daw Ngwe Shein
- Khine Hnin Wai as Tin Tin Nwe
- May Kabyar as Saw Myint Mu
- Nay San as Maung Maung Latt
- Ko Pauk as U Phay Thet
