= Thet Tan Thit =

2014 Burmese thriller film

- Film poster
- Burmese: သက်တံသစ်
- Directed by: Wyne
- Screenplay by: Wyne
- Based on: Thet Tan Thit by Thoe Saung
- Produced by: Khayan Pyar
- Starring: Aung Ye Lin; Phway Phway
- Cinematography: Ko Toe Win
- Edited by: Kyaw Khine Soe
- Production company: Khayay Phyu Film Production
- Release date: December 5, 2014 (Myanmar)
- Running time: 120 minutes
- Country: Myanmar
- Language: Burmese

Thet Tan Thit (Burmese: သက်တံသစ်) is a 2014 Burmese thriller-drama film, directed by Wyne starring Aung Ye Lin and Phway Phway.The film, produced by Khayay Phyu Film Production premiered in Myanmar on December 5, 2014.

== Cast ==
- Aung Ye Lin as Thet Tan
- Phway Phway as Thel Su Nway
- Aung Lwin as Kyaung Oak Gyi
- Zaw Oo as Saya
- Lu Mone as Wun
- Lin Let Hein as Saw Nandar
- Win Myaing as Dr. Mubai
- Yaza Htun Myat (child actor) as C Ko
