= Slaves of Cupid =

2015 Burmese film

- official film poster
- Burmese: ကျူးပစ်ရဲ့ကျေးကျွန်များ
- Directed by: Wyne
- Screenplay by: Ingyin Han
- Based on: Slaves of Cupid by Khu Khu
- Starring: Nay Toe; Sai Sai Kham Leng; Phway Phway
- Production company: Lu Swan Kaung Film Production
- Release date: July 31, 2015
- Running time: 120 minutes
- Country: Myanmar
- Language: Burmese

Slaves of Cupid (Burmese: ကျူးပစ်ရဲ့ကျေးကျွန်များ) is a 2015 Burmese drama film, directed by Wyne starring Nay Toe, Sai Sai Kham Leng and Phway Phway. The film, produced by Lu Swan Kaung Film Production premiered in Myanmar on July 31, 2015.

== Cast ==
- Nay Toe as A Thu
- Sai Sai Kham Leng as Thet Shi
- Phway Phway as Eant Yoon
