= Red Cotton Silk Flower =

- Theatrical poster
- Burmese: လက်ပံ
- Directed by: Wyne
- Screenplay by: Thiha Soe
- Based on: Let Pan by Myar Sitt The
- Produced by: Sein Htay
- Starring: Pyay Ti Oo; Soe Myat Thuzar; Phway Phway
- Release date: December 30, 2012
- Country: Myanmar
- Language: Burmese language

Red Cotton Silk Flower (Burmese: လက်ပံ, romanized: Let Pan) is a 2012 Burmese drama film. It is one of the films that reached the highest-grossing film in Myanmar. It was also shown in Singapore. The film was nominated for Best Actor, Actress, Film, Writer and Director. It was mostly shot in Yangon.

== Plot ==
Yar Zar Kyaw and Mani are a beloved couple that crossed the boundaries that leads Mani to get pregnant. By that time, Yar Zar Kyaw was supposed to be getting married with the person whom his parent wants to get married with, so, he gave Mani Abortion pills with some cash and decided to go their own separate ways. Mani did not want to abort the baby that she decided to deliver the baby, which causes her dad's death. Ten years later, Because Dr. Yar Zar Kyaw's spouse had died, he stayed with U Lay Mya and Amay Tuu in the city of Yangon. One day by the friend's introduction, he got to know a girl named Let Pan. Let Pan is a girl that wants nothing for free from anybody and believes that 'to want something is to give something'. One day, Let Pan was in a car accident and needed blood as she lost much of hers, so U Yar Zar Kyaw donated as they have the same tissues and blood types. So, Let Pan wants to give back something to U Yar Zar Kyaw for donating the blood, even if it's not cash. Consequently, U Yar Zar Kyaw asked Let Pan to tell the story of her parent. Then, he found out that Let Pan was his daughter, and Let Pan also told him about how she was sad, devastated, angry, and frustrated about how her dad did not accept her to come into this universe that he had to destroy her. This film is an entertainment about how deep a father's immeasurable love is to a daughter.

== Cast ==
- Pyay Ti Oo as Yar Zar Kyaw
- Soe Myat Thuzar as Mani
- Phway Phway as Let Pan

Supporting cast -

- Zaw One

== Awards ==
The film won Two awards of the year 2012 in Myanmar Motion Picture Academy Awards as Let Pan (The Red Cotton Silk Flower). The Best actor/actress of there year for Pyay Ti Oo/Phway Phway.
