= It was on Yesterday =

Burmese television series

- Burmese: မနေ့ကဖြစ်သည်
- Genre: Action-crime
- Directed by: Aung Myat
- Starring: Thuriya; A Linn Yaung; Phone Shein Khant; Aye Myat Thu; Yoon Yoon; Thiri Soe Moe; Kaung Set Naing
- Country of origin: Myanmar
- Original language: Burmese
- No. of episodes: 20

Production
- Producer: Taurus V Production
- Production location: Myanmar
- Running time: 40 minutes
- Production company: Taurus V Production

Original release
- Network: MRTV-4
- Release: 2 January – 29 January 2017

It was on Yesterday (Burmese: မနေ့ကဖြစ်သည်) is a 2017 Burmese action-crime television series. It aired on MRTV-4, from January 2 to January 29, 2017, on Mondays to Fridays at 19:00 for 20 episodes.

== Cast ==
- Thu Riya as Oakkar
- A Linn Yaung as Tain Saing
- Phone Shein Khant as Min Myat
- Aye Myat Thu as Khat Khat Khaing
- Yoon Yoon as Pan Yaung
- Thiri Soe Moe as Khin Pont
- Kaung Set Naing as Kyaw Htin

== See also ==
- It was on Yesterday 2
