= Pa Pa Wadi See Yin Khan =

2019 Burmese film

- Film Poster
- Burmese: ပပဝတီစီရင်ခန်း
- Directed by: Wyne
- Screenplay by: Wyne
- Story by: Wyne
- Produced by: Ma Mee Mee
- Starring: Moe Hay Ko; Phway Phway; Htun Htun; A Linn Yaung
- Cinematography: Kyauk Phyu (Padaythar)
- Edited by: Kyaw Khine Soe
- Music by: Yangon Post; Richard Ye Win; Farique Chan Wai Onn; Steven Leong Amier Nelson
- Production company: Mee Mee Shwe Chuu Film Production
- Release date: October 10, 2019 (Myanmar)
- Running time: 113 minutes
- Country: Myanmar
- Language: Burmese

Pa Pa Wadi See Yin Khan (Burmese: ပပဝတီစီရင်ခန်း, lit. 'The Trial of Pa Pa Wadi') is a 2019 Burmese drama film, produced by Mimi Shwe Chu Film Production, and it was released in theaters on October 10, 2019. The film is a modern adaptation based on the legend of King Kutha and Pa Pa Wadi, drawing inspiration from the beauty of Pa Pa Waddy to highlight the rivalry between two beautiful women in a contemporary setting. Directed by Wyne, the film features a leading cast including actresses Moe Hay Ko and Phway Phway, along with actors Htun Htun and A Linn Yaung. The film's main plot revolves around the intriguing story of two women who, in a fierce rivalry over beauty, lose sight of their true selves. The audience is taken on a fascinating journey as they rediscover their true identities and learn that beauty is not everything.

== Premise ==
Nan Shwe Hmone is the most beautiful girl in a university, finds everything easy in life due to her looks.

On the other hand, Thet Htar Khin is a talented girl with a beautiful voice, but her looks always hold her back, preventing her from moving forward in social circles and her career. Constantly belittled by Nan Shwe Hmone, Thet Htar Khin develops a deep-seated resentment.

One day, Thet Htar Khin undergoes a complete transformation and becomes a beautiful woman. This is when the rivalry between the two intensifies. At the end of the story, through their competition, they both come to understand that external beauty is not permanent, and it is their inner self and abilities that truly matter.

== Cast and characters ==
- Moe Hay Ko as Nan Shwe Hmone, an arrogant and beautiful girl
- Phway Phway as Thet Htar Khin, a talented but pitiful and unattractive girl
- Htun Htun as Thiha Ye Yint
- A Linn Yaung as Phone Myat Thway
