= Kha Yay =

2019 Burmese drama film

- Film Poster
- Burmese: ခရေ
- Directed by: Wyne
- Screenplay by: Wyne
- Based on: Kha Yay by Myar Sit The
- Starring: Myint Myat; Wutt Hmone Shwe Yi
- Production company: Na Garr Min Film Production
- Release date: September 5, 2019 (Myanmar)
- Running time: 137 minutes
- Country: Myanmar
- Language: Burmese

Kha Yay (Burmese: ခရေ) is a 2019 Burmese drama film, directed by Wyne starring Myint Myat and Wutt Hmone Shwe Yi. The film, produced by Na Garr Min Film Production premiered in Myanmar on September 5, 2019.

== Cast ==
- Myint Myat as Gezo
- Wutt Hmone Shwe Yi as Ku Ku Naing
- Lu Mone as U Maung Ko
- San Htut as Myint Mo
- Win Myaing as U Win Myint
