= Shal Chway Ma =

2018 Burmese film

- Film Poster
- Burmese: ရှယ်ချွေးမ
- Directed by: Ko Zaw (Ar Yone Oo)
- Screenplay by: Lwin Min Eant
- Story by: Lwin Min Eant
- Starring: Yan Aung; Aung Ye Lin; Soe Myat Thuzar; Htet Htet Moe Oo; Khin Wint Wah
- Production company: Sein Htay Film Production
- Release date: April 27, 2018
- Running time: 120 minutes
- Country: Myanmar
- Language: Burmese

Shal Chway Ma (Burmese: ရှယ်ချွေးမ) is a 2018 Burmese comedy-drama film, directed by Ko Zaw (Ar Yone Oo) starring Yan Aung, Aung Ye Lin, Soe Myat Thuzar, Htet Htet Moe Oo and Khin Wint Wah. The film, produced by Sein Htay Film Production premiered Myanmar on April 27, 2018.

== Cast ==
- Yan Aung as Oakkar
- Aung Ye Lin as Nay Min Khant
- Soe Myat Thuzar as Moe Shwe Hlwar
- Htet Htet Moe Oo as Hlaing Thitsar
- Khin Wint Wah as Hsaung Than Zin
