= 3Girls =

2017 Burmese horror drama film

- Film poster
- Burmese: သရဲမ၊ဘီလူးမနှင့်မိန်းမပျို
- Directed by: Wyne
- Screenplay by: Nay Naw
- Based on: Silent, deep evidence by Lun Htar Htar
- Starring: A Linn Yaung; Phway Phway; Ei Chaw Po; Paing Phyo Thu
- Cinematography: Kyauk Phyu (Pa Day Thar); Ko Nay Win
- Music by: Mee Mee Khel
- Production company: Dawei Movie Production
- Release date: December 15, 2017
- Running time: 140 minutes
- Country: Myanmar
- Language: Burmese

3Girls (Burmese: သရဲမ၊ဘီလူးမနှင့်မိန်းမပျို), also known as 3G or Ghost, Giant and Girl, is a 2017 Burmese horror film starring A Linn Yaung, Phway Phway, Ei Chaw Po and Paing Phyo Thu. The film produced by Dawei Movie Production premiered in Myanmar on December 15, 2017.

== Cast ==
- A Linn Yaung as Kyi Nyo
- Phway Phway as Khaung Pwint Lwar (Giant)
- Ei Chaw Po as Moe Sat Cho (Ghost)
- Paing Phyo Thu as Shwe Yoke Thwin (Girl)

== Awards and nominations ==
Year	Award	Category	Nominee	Result
2017	Myanmar Motion Picture Academy Awards	Best Sound	Kyi Min Thein	Nominated
2017	Myanmar Motion Picture Academy Awards	Best Editing	Kyaw Khine Soe	Nominated
2017	Myanmar Motion Picture Academy Awards	Best Cinematography	Kyauk Phyu & Nay Win	Won
2017	Myanmar Motion Picture Academy Awards	Best Supporting Actress	Paing Phyo Thu	Won
