= Reflection (2018 film) =

- ရောင်ပြန်
- Directed by: Lu Min
- Produced by: Thudra Production
- Starring: Htun Eaindra Bo; Eaindra Kyaw Zin; Wutt Hmone Shwe Yi; Patricia
- Release date: 17 April 2018
- Country: Myanmar
- Languages: Burmese; Shan

Reflection is a Burmese language film directed by Lu Min. The film was produced by Thudra Productions, a corporation owned by Eaindra Kyaw Zin. The movie starred Htun Eaindra Bo, Eaindra Kyaw Zin, Wutt Hmone Shwe Yi, and Pactria.

== Cast ==
- Htun Eaindra Bo as May Nat Khat, a Burmese millionaire and lesbian
- Eaindra Kyaw Zin as May Nine
- Wutt Hmone Shwe Yi as Co Cole
- Patricia as A Yake
