= Yair Yint Aung =

Burmese rapper-songwriter and actor (born 1993)

- ရဲရင့်အောင်
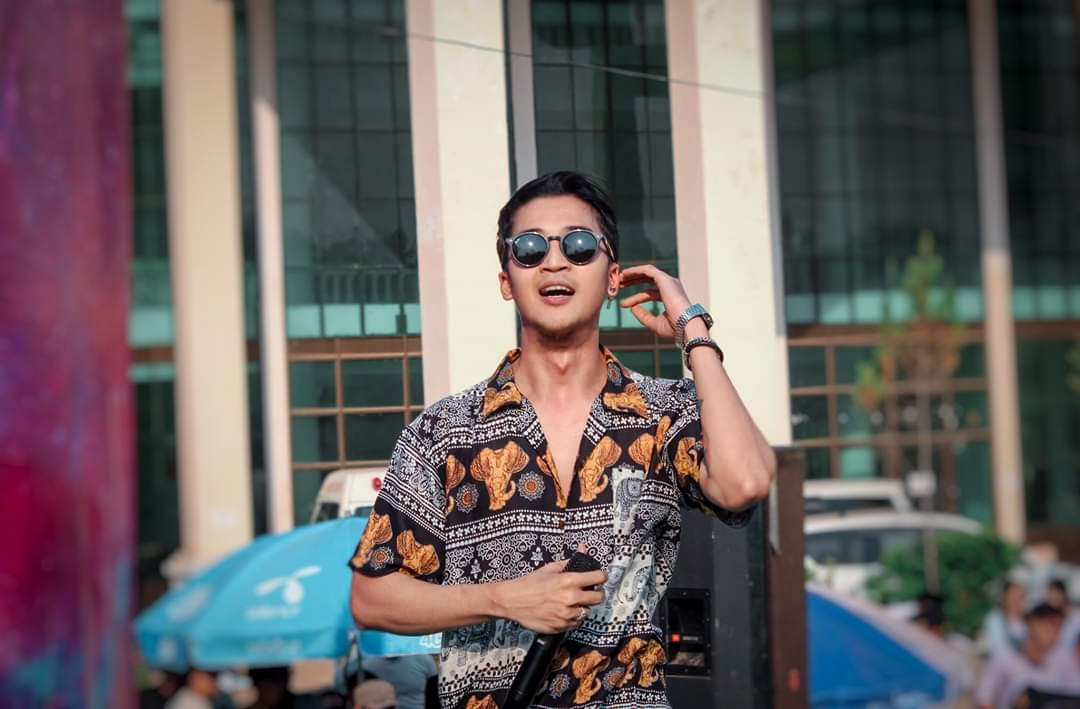
- Yair Yint Aung in 2020
- Born: Yair Yint Aung; 18 August 1993 (age 32); Yangon, Myanmar
- Occupations: Singer-songwriter, actor
- Height: 5 ft 8 in (1.73 m)
- Parent(s): Soe Lwin; May Soe Myint
- Musical career
- Genres: R&B, soul
- Instruments: Vocals; Guitar; Piano
- Years active: 2011–present

Yair Yint Aung (Burmese: ရဲရင့်အောင်; also spelled Ye Yint Aung, born 18 August 1993) is a Burmese singer-songwriter and actor. He is considered one of the most successful Burmese singers and rose to fame with his album "A Mone Diary".

== Early life and education ==
Yair Yint Aung was born on 18 August 1993 in Yangon, Myanmar. He is the only son of Soe Lwin, a sailor and his wife May Soe Myint. He attended Basic Education High School No. 2 Dagon and graduated high school from Basic Education High School No. 3 North Dagon. He attended Thanlyin Technological University.

== Career ==
=== Music career ===
Yair Yint Aung began his career in 2011 and participated in Bo Bo Entertainment's group albums. He has become popular due to "Lwan Lun Loh" song from the "Bo Bo 1st Anniversary" album, which gained him to nationwide recognition and that song has been one of the all-time hits in his career. In February 2012, he released "A Mone Diary", a duet album with Thar Thar. The album was a commercial success reaching the top of the album charts. The follow-up video album was released on 28 December 2013.

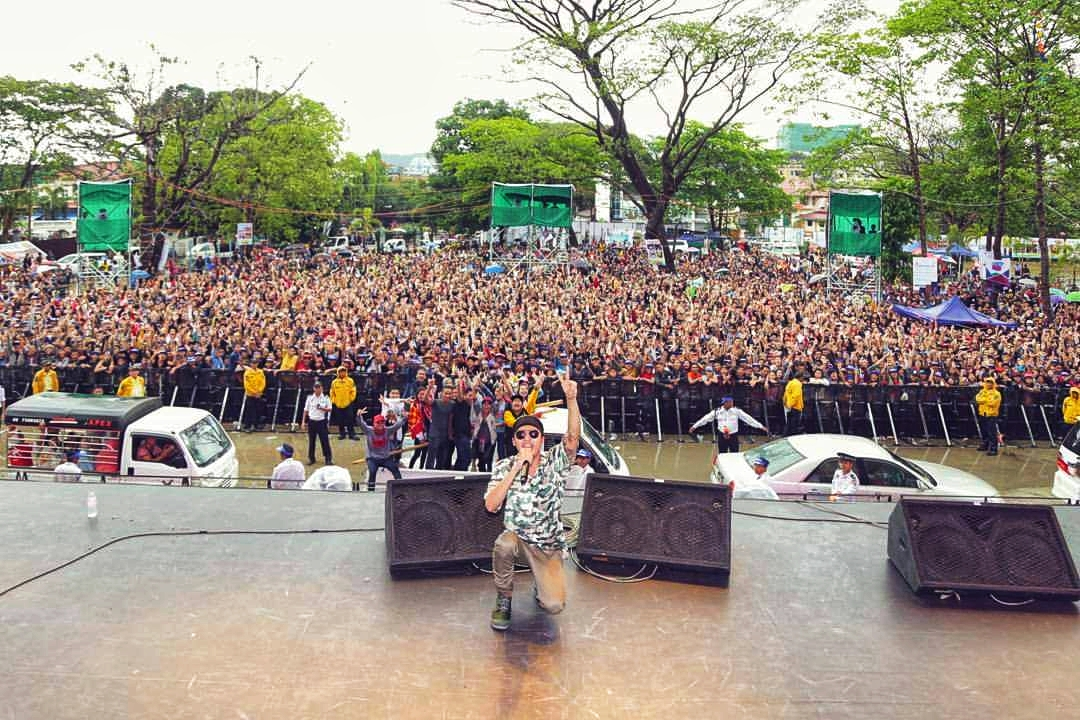
Yair Yint Aung performing in a concert

He launched his debut solo album "Chay" on 25 December 2014 which was officially distributed to all parts of Myanmar. The album was spawned more huge hits. The follow-up video album was released on 15 October 2016.

He won the "Best Pop Music Award for Winter" and "Best Pop Album Award" at the 2014 Myanmar Music Awards (MMA). In 2018, he founded the record label YID (Yes I Did), and his next album "G.O.A.T." came out in August 2020.

=== Acting career ===
Yair Yint Aung made his acting debut in 2016 with a leading role in the film QC Game, alongside Ei Chaw Po. He then starred in his second film Waiting For You, alongside Nan Su Oo, also in 2016. After this film, he starred in his third film Hae, alongside Thinza Nwe Win and directed by Thar Nyi, released in May 2016.

In 2017, he made his big-screen debut with Nga Ko Nan De Mohndaing (The Storm That Kissed Me) where he played the leading role with Phway Phway and Hlwan Paing which screened in Myanmar cinemas on 1 June 2018. The film was a huge commercial hit slot nationally, topping film ratings and becoming the most watched film at that time. His portrayal of the character Aww Ya Htoo earned praised by fans for his acting performance and character interpretation, and experienced a resurgence of popularity.

In 2018, he starred in comedy film Jin Party, where he played the main role with Yan Aung, Lu Min, Htoo Aung, and Eaindra Kyaw Zin which screened in Myanmar cinemas on 22 August 2019. In 2019, he was cast in horror comedy film Khaw Than and comedy film Yaw Thama Mwe.

== Brand Ambassadorships ==
He was appointed as a brand ambassador of Ve Ve Beverages on 28 February 2015.

== Filmography ==
=== Film ===
- QC Game (ကြူစီဂိမ်း) (2016)
- Waiting For You (2016)
- Hae (ဟဲ့) (2016)

=== Film (Cinema) ===
Year	Film	Burmese title	Role	Note
2018	The Storm that Kissed Me	ငါ့ကိုနမ်းတဲ့ မုန်တိုင်း	Aww Ra Htoo	
2019	Jin Party	ဂျင်ပါတီ	Yoe Yar	
2023	Intentional Rain	ရည်ရွယ်မိုး	Nay Min Thit	
TBA	Khaw Than	ခေါ်သံ	Tun Tauk	
TBA	Yawthama Hmway	ရောသမမွေ		

== Discography ==
=== Solo albums ===
- Chay (ချေ) (2014)
- G.O.A.T (2020)
- Unusual Things (ပုံမှန်မဟုတ်ခြင်းများ) (2023)

=== Duet albums ===
- A Mone Diary (အမုန်းဒိုင်ယာရီ) (2012)

== Awards and nominations ==
Year	Award	Category	Recipient	Result
2015	City FM Music Awards	Most Requested Song Award (Male)	—N/a	Won
2015	Shwe FM Music Awards	Most Requested Single of the Year (Male)	"Waiting For You"	Won
2014	Shwe FM Music Awards	Best Music Video Award	"Ya Par Tal Htwat Thwar Par"	Won
2013	Shwe FM Music Awards	Most Requested Single of the Year (Male)	"Lwan Loon Loh"	Won
2014	Myanmar Music Awards (MMA)	Best Pop Music Award for Winter	"Chay"	Won
2014	Myanmar Music Awards (MMA)	Best Pop Album Award	"Chay"	Won
