= Phyu Phyu Htwe =

Burmese internet personality

- ဖြူဖြူထွေး
- Born: Phyu Phyu Htwe; 20 February 1999 (age 27); Myay Ni Kone village, Mahlaing, Mandalay Region, Myanmar
- Education: Dagon University
- Occupations: Internet personality, comedian, actress
- Years active: 2017–present
- Parent: Daw Mi Se (mother)

Phyu Phyu Htwe (Burmese: ဖြူဖြူထွေး; born 22 February 1999) is a Burmese internet personality, comedian and actress. She initially gained fame in 2017 after a video of her performing a backbend on stage at her university's festival went viral on Facebook. Phyu Phyu Htwe primarily creates comedic content and has over 11 million followers on Facebook, making her Myanmar's most-followed entertainer on the platform.

== Early life and education ==
Phyu Phyu Htwe was born on 20 February 1999 in Myay Ni Kone village, Mahlaing, Mandalay Region, Myanmar. She is the youngest of five siblings. Her mother, Daw Mi Se, sometimes appears in her comedy videos. She moved to Yangon after completing her matriculation exam and also attended nursing training. While working as a nurse, she used her salary to fund her first-year education at Dagon University. Later, she enrolled in a TV presenter training class at MMDC and eventually secured presenter jobs at other organizations as well. She graduated from Dagon University with a bachelor's degree in botany in December 2019.

== Career ==
Phyu Phyu Htwe rose to prominence in 2017 when a video of her performing a backbend on stage at her university's festival went viral on Facebook. The video brought her widespread notoriety and sparked significant criticism on social media, with many deeming her performance inappropriate for a woman and contrary to traditional cultural norms. Since then, she has posted dozens of stand-up videos on her Facebook page, gradually gaining a massive following. She appeared in numerous advertisements and became the highest-paid social media commercial star in Myanmar.

As of 2024, she has over 11 million followers on Facebook, making her the most-followed artist on social media in Myanmar. She quickly amassed wealth and, within a short time, owned an expensive home in Yangon. She has helped her hometown village by contributing to efforts to bring electricity. Her success in social media comedy led to several music videos and movie casting opportunities.

In 2018, she took on her first film role in De Pwal Kyan Mal, starring alongside Sitt Naing. In 2019, she was cast in her first big-screen film, Yawthama Mway, which was released in Burmese cinemas in November 2023. She then starred in upcoming film Ma Akhayar.

In 2020, during the COVID-19 pandemic, she stopped filming comedy videos but continued to engage in various activities through social media, including donations to support struggling artists' families and underprivileged communities, which earned her increased support from her audience. Eleven Media Group featured her as the "Rising Star of 2020". In July 2020, she was appointed as the Kindness Ambassador of Yangon Vocational College of Technology.

On 7 September 2023, she released her first single, "Bayinma" (Queen).

== Charity work ==
Phyu Phyu Htwe is also praised for her donations and charity activities. She frequently donates to the families of struggling artists and helps random individuals in need. During times of limited artistic opportunities, she assisted forgotten and older actors and entertainers by including them in her advertisement shoots, providing them with financial support.

Phyu Phyu Htwe made 10 donations during the 2024 flooding in Myanmar. In recognition of her contributions, she was honored with a humanitarian award by the Light Foundation.

== Political criticism ==
In the aftermath of the 2021 Myanmar coup d'état, Phyu Phyu Htwe was accused of being a supporter of the military junta and remained ominously silent for a period. She only responded after her fans urged her to do so, briefly posting a profile picture featuring the three-finger salute in support of restoring democracy. On 1 March 2021, she joined a few protests and called on civil servants to join the Civil Disobedience Movement (CDM), which seemed for show.

Later, she expressed her support for the coup by commenting, "They only seized power for one year, what's wrong with you guys?" on her Facebook page. This remark, along with her posting dancing videos during the coup era, made her the target of social boycotts and a public punishment movement. Phyu Phyu Htwe faced backlash again after visiting Kin Ma, a village devastated by a fire caused by the Myanmar Army, to make a donation while livestreaming the event. This occurred while the military junta was blocking aid and rescue efforts for the village. She subsequently shared the video online, which led to difficulties for local residents and other donors on the ground. Over 20 business brands that had collaborated with her announced the termination of their partnerships.

On December 23, 2024, Phyu Phyu Htwe faced widespread criticism after posting an online advertisement titled "The Revered Mother Haung Su" (မယ်တော်ဟောင်စု). In the ad, she was portrayed dressed in the style of detained State Counsellor Aung San Suu Kyi and acting as a shaman who heals with lies. The backlash centered on accusations that the advertisement deliberately targeted Aung San Suu Kyi. Critics pointed out that the name "Haung Su" in Burmese phonetically resembles "bark Su" which was interpreted as a derogatory reference likening her to a dog. Moreover, the script's dialogue included the phrases "79" and "leave it", which many social media users criticized as deliberate references to Aung San Suu Kyi's age, as she is currently 79 years old. Many revolutionary groups condemned Phyu Phyu Htwe for the advertisement. The local armed PDF force, Black Hero UG, issued a statement warning that they would not forgive her for this action. They declared it a final warning and stated that they would carry out an assassination if she did not retract her actions. On December 25, Phyu Phyu Htwe removed the video from her page. By that afternoon, Phyu Phyu Htwe and the scriptwriter posted an apology video on her page, stating that they had no intention of offending anyone and that the content was created with sincerity.

== Filmography ==
=== Film ===
- De Pwal Kyan Mal (ဒီပွဲကြမ်းမယ်) (2018)
- Yawthama Mway (ရောသမမွှေ) (2019)
- Ma Akhayar (မ အက္ခရာ) (TBA)

== Discography ==
=== Singles ===
- Bayinma (2023)
- May May Su Lal Su Pr Say Tot Kwal (2023)
- Maw Shan Toh Htar Nay (2024)
- A Pyo Gyi Loz Ma Call Nae (2024)
