= Zay Ye Htet =

Burmese actor, model and producer (born 1986)

- ဇေရဲထက်
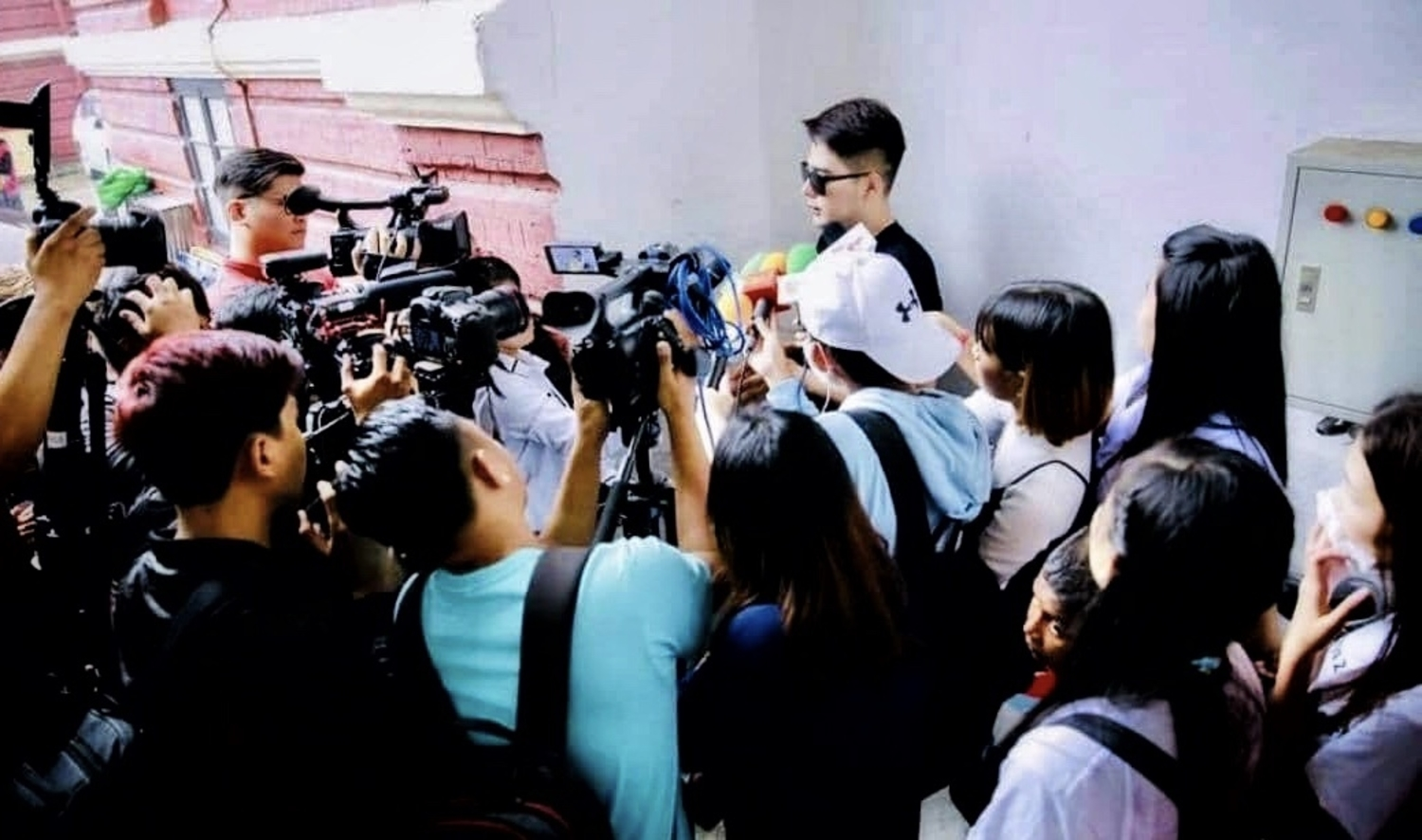
- Zay Ye Htet in 2020
- Born: 2 January 1986 (age 40); Lewe, Myanmar
- Education: Kyaukse University
- Occupations: Actor, model, producer
- Years active: 2010–present
- Height: 180.34 cm (5 ft 11 in)

Zay Ye Htet (Burmese: ဇေရဲထက်; born 2 January 1986) is a Burmese actor, model and producer. He is considered one of the highest successful actors of Burmese cinema. Throughout his career, he has acted in over 100 films. In 2018, he founded the ZYH Film & Video Production.

== Early life and education ==
Zay Ye Htet was born on 2 January 1986 in Lewe, Myanmar. He is the eldest child among four siblings. He studied at Kyaukse University, majoring in Law for second year.

== Career ==
He joined John Lwin's model training Stars Int'l Models Agency in 2010. Since then, he took professional training in modelling and catwalk. He began his entertainment career as a runway model as part of the Stars Int'l Models Agency with countless commercial model shows and runways that had been walked on. He then competed in the male model contests and have won many awards, such as Mr. Crown Award, Mr. Lapyaewun second runner-up award, Mr. Bestmatch Award, and Mr. Hero. Then came the offers for TV commercials and appeared in many TV commercial advertisements. His hardwork as a model and acting in TV commercials was noticed by the film industry and soon, film casting offers came rolling in.

In 2012, he signed a contract with Thalwin Film Production as their lead actor. He made his acting debut with a leading role in film Pyaw Loh Ma Phit Buu, alongside May Kabyar, and directed by Thamee Myat Kyaw. He then starred in films 2002 Zay Ye and 30 February, was both a domestic hit, and led to increased recognition for Zay Ye Htet.

Zay Ye Htet made his big-screen debut with Online Paw Ka Wi Nyin alongside Nay Toe, Phway Phway and Chan Mi Mi Ko, which screened in Myanmar cinemas in January 2015. From 2015 to 2017, he has starred in several films. In 2018, he took on his first big-screen leading role in film Yar Zawin Yine Khae The alongside Aung Lay, Ye Aung, Zin Zin Zaw Myint and Khin Zarchi Kyaw which screened in Myanmar cinemas on 20 July 2018 and received critical acclaim and positive reviews for his portrayal of the character. Then he had to play in several films in 2019, such as Wine Gyi Choke Sponsor, Youk Pha Sit Sin Yay, Yamamin & Lucky Man and Noh Bi Lu.

== Filmography ==
=== Films ===
Over 100 films, including

- Pyaw Loh Ma Phit Buu (ပြောလို့မဖြစ်ဘူး) (2012)
- 2002 Zay Ye (2012)
- 30 February (2012)
- Chote Say (ချုပ်ဆေး)
- Kyite Tar Yway Lite Lu Pyo Tway Pe (ကြိုက်တာရွေးလိုက် လူပျိုးတွေပဲ)
- Lu Soe Lay Myarr (လူဆိူးလေးများ)
- Moe Nant Thin Dae Nay Ma Win Nya Nay (မိုးနံ့သင်းတဲ့ နေမဝင်ညနေ)
- Nay Nae Pwint Dae Kumudra (နေနဲ့ပွင့်တဲ့ကုမုဒရာ)
- A Ngi Sel Yat (အငြိဆယ်ရက်)
- Kout Kyaung Myinn Pyaing (ကောက်ကြောင်းမျဉ်းပြိုင်)
- Ti Kya Ko Ko Nae Shat Pyar Pyo Pyo (တိကျကိုကို ရှက်ပြာပြိုပြို)
- Tout Tout Kyaw (တောက်တောက်ကြော်)
- A Chit Ko Win Yan Kya (အချစ်ကိုဝန်းရံကျ)
- T Khar Ka Htar Wa Ya Myarr (တစ်ခါကထာဝရများ)
- Arr Nar Parr Nar Pyan Chit Par (အားနာပါးနာပြန်ချစ်ပါ)
- Nga Yin Khwin Htae Ka Late Pyar (ငါ့ရင်ခွင်ထဲကလိပ်ပြာ)

=== Films (Cinema) ===
- Online Paw Ka Wit Nyin (အွန်လိုင်းပေါ်ကဝိညာည်) (2015)
- Yar Zawin Yine Khae The (ရာဇဝင်ရိုင်းခဲ့သည်) (2018)
- A Thel Kwal Party (အသဲကွဲပါတီ) (2018)
- A So Taw Tway Nay Tae Ywar (အဆိုတော်တွေနေတဲ့ရွာ) (2018)
- Pha Ye Thi Model (ဖရဲသီးမော်ဒယ်) (2018)
- Wine Gyi Choke Sponsor (ဝိုင်းကြီးချုပ် စပွန်ဆာ) (2019)
- Youk Pha Sit Sin Yay (ယောက်ဖစစ်ဆင်ရေး) (2019)
- Yamamin & Lucky Man (ယမမင်းနဲ့ကိုကံကောင်း) (2019)
- The Milk Ogre (နို့ဘီလူး) (2019)
