= Yoon Yoon =

Burmese actress

- ယွန်းယွန်း
- Born: Yoon Thader Aung; January 19, 2000 (age 26); Yangon, Myanmar
- Other name: Yoon Thader Aung
- Education: University of Yangon
- Occupations: Actress, Model
- Years active: 2003–present
- Height: 5 ft 5 in (1.65 m)
- Awards: Myanmar Academy Award (Best Child Actress)

Yoon Yoon (Burmese: ယွန်းယွန်း; born Yoon Thader Aung on 19 January 2000) is a Myanmar Academy Award winning Burmese actress, model and former child actress. She is noted for her long hair and smile. Yoon won her first Special Academy Award with the film Tein Min Tha Mee Yae Dan Ta Yi (The Myth of Cloud Princess) in 2012.

== Early life and education ==
Yoon Yoon was born on 19 January 2000 in Yangon, Myanmar. She has been acting since she was three years old thanks to her grandmother Thae Nu Aung, an actress. She started her school at Basic Education High School No. 3 Botahtaung and graduated in 2016 with 2 distinctions, Myanmar and Biology. She is currently studying at University of Yangon, majoring in Psychology.

== Career ==
Yoon Yoon started acting as a child because of her visit to her grandmother's shooting. Although she started at three years old, she can do continuously at her six years of age. In 2012, she won the Special Myanmar Academy Award for Best Child Actress with the film Tein Min Tha Mee Yae Dan Ta Yi. She stopped acting for two years because of the Matriculation Examination of Myanmar. From 2006 to present, she has acted in over 100 video/films and appeared in many magazines cover.

In 2015, Yoon starred in the hit drama film I'm Rose, Darling, portrayed the role of young Htar Thakhin. The film was a huge commercial success and reached the highest-grossing in Myanmar. Yoon received acclaim for her acting performance in the drama. In 2016, she starred the female lead in the hit thriller series It was on Yesterday, alongside A Linn Yaung, Thu Riya and Aye Myat Thu which aired on MRTV-4 on 2 January 2017. Yoon's portrayal of the character earned praised by fans for her acting performance and character interpretation, and experienced a resurgence of popularity. In 2018, she starred in the television series Shwe Min Tha Mee Nae Lu Lain (Princess and Crook), where she played the leading role with Tyron Bejay and Ye Mon which aired on Myawaddy TV on 23 March 2018.

== Filmography ==
=== Film ===
Over 100 films, including

- Tein Min Tha Mee Yae Dan Ta Yi (တိမ်မင်းသမီးရဲ့ဒဏ္ဍာရီ) (2012)
- Satan's Dancer ( စေတန်ရဲ့ကချေသည်) (စေတန်ရဲ့ကချေသည်) (2013)
- I'm Rose, Darling (ကျွန်မကနှင်းဆီပါမောင်) (2015)

=== Television series ===
Year	English title	Myanmar title	Role	Network	Notes
2017	It was on Yesterday	မနေ့ကဖြစ်သည်	Pan Yaung	MRTV-4	
2018	Shwe Min Tha Mee Nae Lu Lain	ရွှေမင်းသမီးနဲ့လူလိမ်	Yupar Ko	Myawaddy TV	

== Awards and nominations ==
Year	Award	Category	Nominated work	Result
2012	Myanmar Academy Award	Best Child Actress (Special Award)	Tein Min Tha Mee Yae Dan Ta Yi	Won
