= A Linn Yaung =

Burmese actor, model and singer

- အလင်းရောင်
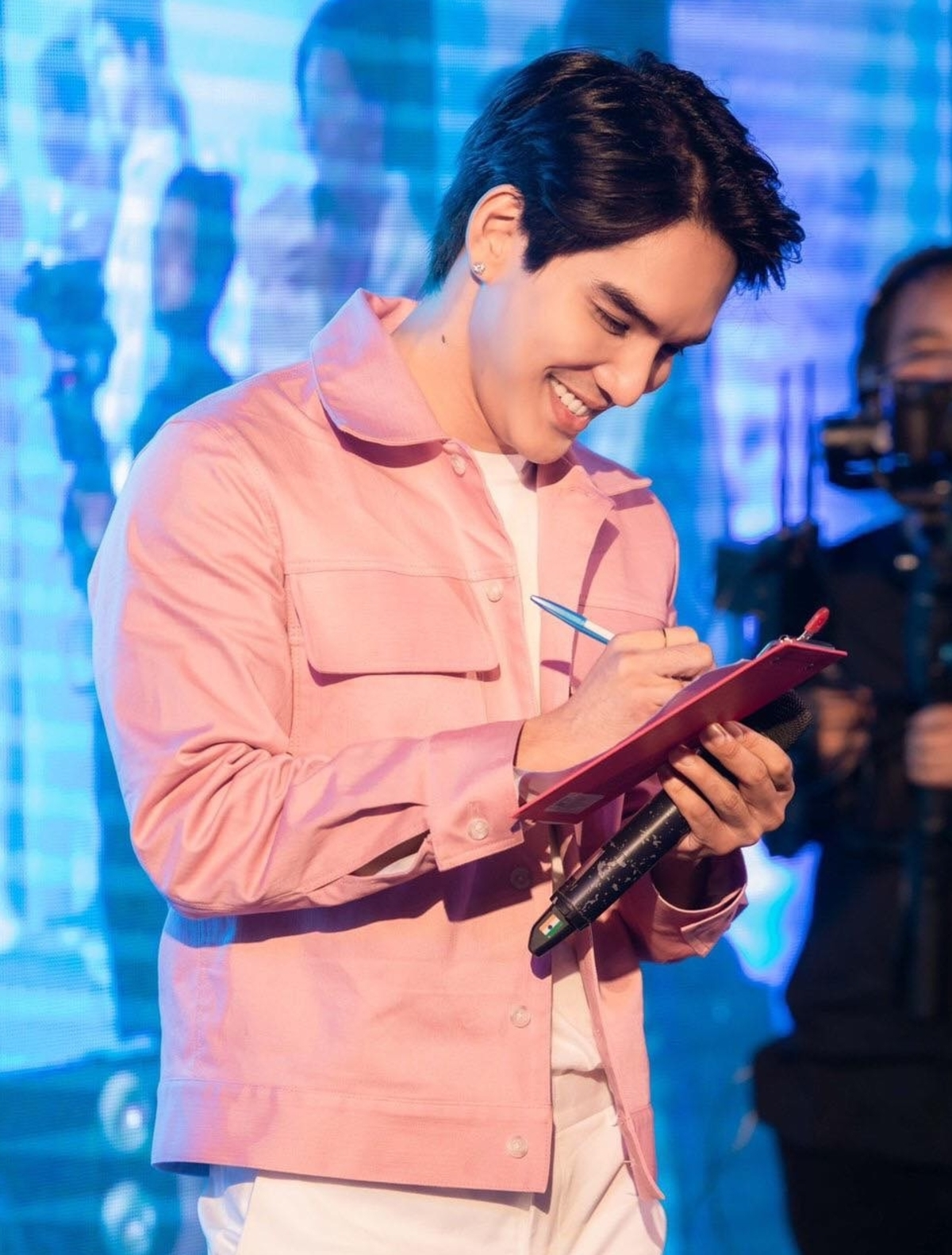
- A Linn Yaung in 2020
- Born: Wai Yan Myint; 22 April 1992 (age 34); Mandalay, Myanmar
- Other name: Light
- Education: Yadanabon University; University of Foreign Languages, Mandalay
- Occupations: Actor, model, singer
- Years active: 2008–present
- Height: 5 ft 10 in (1.78 m)
- Parent(s): Maung Maung Myint; Thi Thi Swe

A Linn Yaung (Burmese: အလင်းရောင်, lit. Light, also spelled ALINNYAUNG and A Lin Yaung; born Wai Yan Myint on 22 April 1992) is a Burmese actor, model and singer. He was nominated for the Best Actor award at the 2018 & 2024 Myanmar Academy Award for his performance in the film The Bride (2018) & "Mi Tin Sein" (2024).

== Early life and education ==
A Linn Yaung was born on April 22, 1992, in Mandalay, Myanmar, to parent Maung Maung Myint and his wife Thi Thi Swe. Yaung is the middle child among three siblings, having an older and younger brother. He went to monastic school and earned a B.A in English from Yadanabon University in 2011. Yaung also holds a diploma in English from the University of Foreign Languages, Mandalay.

== Career ==
=== 2008–2011: Beginnings as a model ===
In late 2008, Yaung began working as a model for Talent & Model Agency Mandalay, taking part in fashion show catwalks as well as taking up acting roles in various TV commercial and advertisements. During this time, he had been recognized as a brand ambassador of Unique Men wears and later, Bison Energy drink. His dedicated work as a model and his acting roles in commercials was noticed by the film industry, subsequently resulting in an increase in film casting offers.

=== 2012–2015: Acting debut and challenge ===
In 2012, Young signed a seven-year contract with Mahogany Film Production as their lead actor. He made his acting debut in 2013 with the film Swel Ser Pyit Lite Tot, starring alongside Yan Aung, Thu Riya, and Soe Myat Thuzar. Yaung then starred in his second film A Thel Kyi Wittye alongside Wutt Hmone Shwe Yi and Thu Riya. In 2014, he took on his first big-screen lead role in the drama First Love with Thinzar Nwe Win which screened in Myanmar cinemas on 18 December 2015. He then played the lead role in the 2017 film Bal Yee Ser Ko Achit Sone Lae. Following a series of disagreements, Yaung left Mahogany Film Production in late 2015 and released his first solo album in 2016.

=== 2016–present: Rising popularity and breakthrough ===
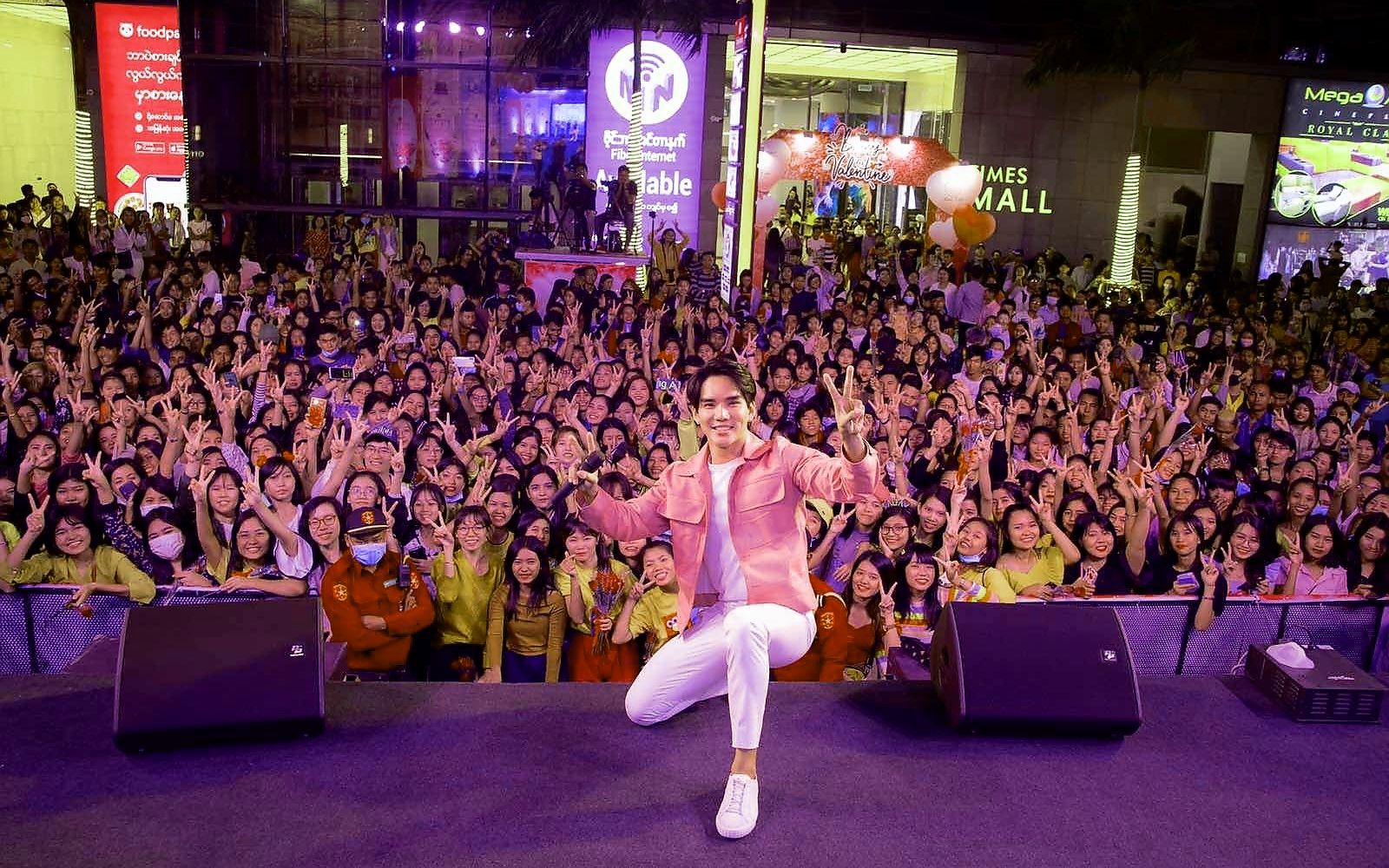
Yaung poses with fans at a concert

Yaung signed an acting deal with Dawei Film Production in 2016 and collaborated with Burmese director Wyne; Yaung is currently continuing his work with Dawei Production. His debut solo album "Oh! My Crush" was released on 21 May 2016. In 2017, he starred in the drama film Shwe Kyar (Golden Lotus), in which he co-starred with Phway Phway and Thinzar Wint Kyaw; Shwe Kyar began screening in Myanmar cinemas on March 16, 2018. That same year, he starred as the male lead in the 2018 horror drama film Carbon Dioxide, alongside Kyaw Htet Aung, Phway Phway and Yadanar Bo. His portrayal of the villain character was received well by Yaung's fans, with praise going towards his acting performance and interpretation of his character. Subsequently, Yaung experienced a new surge in popularity.

A Linn Yaung co-starred with Phway Phway in the horror film Tadotamee (The Bride), which earned him a nomination for the 2018 Myanmar Academy Award for Best Actor. The same year, he was nominated for Best Supporting Actor for his role inShwe Kyar (Golden Lotus) at the 2018 ASEAN International Film Festival & Awards (AIFFA).

== Political activities ==
Following the 2021 Myanmar coup d'état, A Linn Yaung was active in the anti-coup movement at physical rallies and through social media. He has taken part in protests since February. Yaung joined the "We Want Justice" three-finger salute movement.

On April 4, 2021, warrants for his arrest were issued under section 505 (a) of the penal code by the State Administration Council for speaking out against the military coup. Along with several other celebrities, he was charged with calling for participation in the Civil Disobedience Movement (CDM) and damaging the state's ability to govern, with supporting the Committee Representing Pyidaungsu Hluttaw, and with the generally incitement of the people with he intention of disturbing the peace and stability of Myanmar.

== Filmography ==
=== Film (Cinema) ===
Year	Film	Burmese title	Role	Note
2014	First Love	ရည်းစားဦး	Leading role	
2017	Bal Yee Ser Ko Achit Sone Lae	ဘယ်ရည်းစားကို အချစ်ဆုံးလဲ	Leading role	
2017	3Girls	သရဲမ၊ဘီလူးမနှင့်မိန်းမပျို	Leading role	
2018	Shwe Kyar (Golden Lotus)	ရွှေကြာ	Leading role	
2018	CO2	ကာဗွန်ဒိုင်အောက်ဆိုဒ်	Leading role	
2018	Eatehtiya	ဣတ္ထိယ	Leading role	
2018	Letter To President	သမ္မတကြီးထံ ပေးစာ	Supporting role	
2018	Bride	သတို့သမီး	Leading role	
2018	Naung Twin Au Htan Twin Say Ta Dee	နောင်တွင် ဥဒါန်းတွင်စေသတည်း	Leading role	
2019	Pa Pa Wadi See Yin Khan	ပပဝတီ စီရင်ခန်း	Supporting role	
2019	Shae Twer Nout Lite	ရှေ့သွားနောက်လိုက်	Supporting role	
2022	Image	ပုံရိပ်	Leading role	
2024	Mi Tin Sein	မိတင်စိန်	Leading Role	
2024	Kant Kaw Ni	ကံ့ကော်နီ	Leading role	
2024	Nat Win The	နတ်ဝင်သည်	Leading role	
2026	The Guest House	ဧည့်ဂေဟာ	Leading Role	
2026		ယောက်ျားဧကန်	Leading Role	
2026	Shwe Pin Oh	ရွှေပင်အို	Leading Role	

=== Film ===
Year	Film	Role	Note
2012	Swel Ser Pyit Lite Tot	Leading role	
2013	A Thel Kyi Wittye	Leading role	
2016	Romeo & Shin Mway Non	Leading role	
2017	The Story of Thuyaungmal	Leading role	
2017	Blue Bunch No (13)	Leading role	

=== Television series ===
Year	English title	Myanmar title	Notes
2018	It was on Yesterday	မနေ့ကဖြစ်သည်	MRTV-4
2019	The Traveler's Note	ခရီးသွားကောက်ကြောင်း	CANAL+ Myanmar
2019	Thit Sar Shi Tal	သစ္စာချည်တိုင်	
2023-2024	Sparkle Hearts	ရင်ထဲကြွေတဲ့ကြယ်	CANAL+ Myanmar
2024	A Mhat Ta Melt Mha A Mhat Ta Ya Hsi Thoh	အမှတ်တမဲ့မှ အမှတ်တရဆီသို့	M Channel Myanmar
2025	I'm Queen	ငါဘုရင်မ	Mahar

== Discography ==
=== Solo albums ===
- Oh! My Crush (2016)

== Awards and nominations ==
Year	Award	Category	Nominated work	Result
2018	Myanmar Academy Award	Best Actor	The Bride	Nominated
2018	ASEAN International Film Festival & Awards	Best Supporting Actor	Shwe Kyar(Golden Lotus)	Nominated
2024	Myanmar Academy Award	Best Actor	Mi Tin Sein	Nominated
2025	Myanmar Academy Award	Best Actor	Kant Kaw Ni	Nominated
