= Ponnya Khin =

Burmese novelist and writer (born 1972)

- ပုညခင်
- Born: 22 September 1972 (age 53); Kyaunggon, Myanmar
- Education: Yangon University
- Occupation: Writer

Ponnya Khin (Burmese: ပုညခင်; born 22 September 1972) is a Burmese novelist and writer, known for her best-selling novel Kya Ma Ka Hnin Si Par Maung (I'm Rose, Darling). She is a prolific writer, having produced 125 novels and 6 short story collections.

== Biography ==
Ponnya Khin was born on 22 September 1972 in the Irawaddy Delta town of Kyaunggon in Bassein District (now Pathein). At the age of 19, became a village primary school teacher while studying for her degree. During that time, she started writing novels and short stories. In 1995, she resigned from teaching.

Ponnya moved to Yangon and took a post-graduate course in Applied Psychology at Yangon University and began to publish novels based on her personal experiences. Ponnya Khin's novels describe the conditions of the rural education system and life as a village schoolteacher, urban social life, the life of girls and her personal experiences.

== Works ==
- A Nauk Taung A Yat Hma Lar Khe Thu (Girl from the South West)
- A Shay Ta Khar A Win (Enter by the Front Door)
- Min Ga La Bar Sayama (Auspicious Day, Teacher)
- Lat Kyan La Yaung
- Taung Dan Dway Yae A Lon (Beyond the mountains)

== Film adaptations ==
Many of Ponnya Khin's most popular novels have been adapted into Burmese language films, including:

- Kya Ma Ka Hnin Si Par Maung (I'm Rose, Darling)
- A Nan Wine (Kiss Wine)
- Yat Yat Sat Sat Moe (Cruel Rain)
- Hmaw Sayar Phan Sin De Chit Chin
- Phwet Kabyar (Love Poem Created by a Wizard)
- A Htet Tan Sar….Yay
- Khit Ye Thamee Pyo Myar (Girls of the Era)
