= Aung Ye Lin =

Burmese actor and model

- အောင်ရဲလင်း
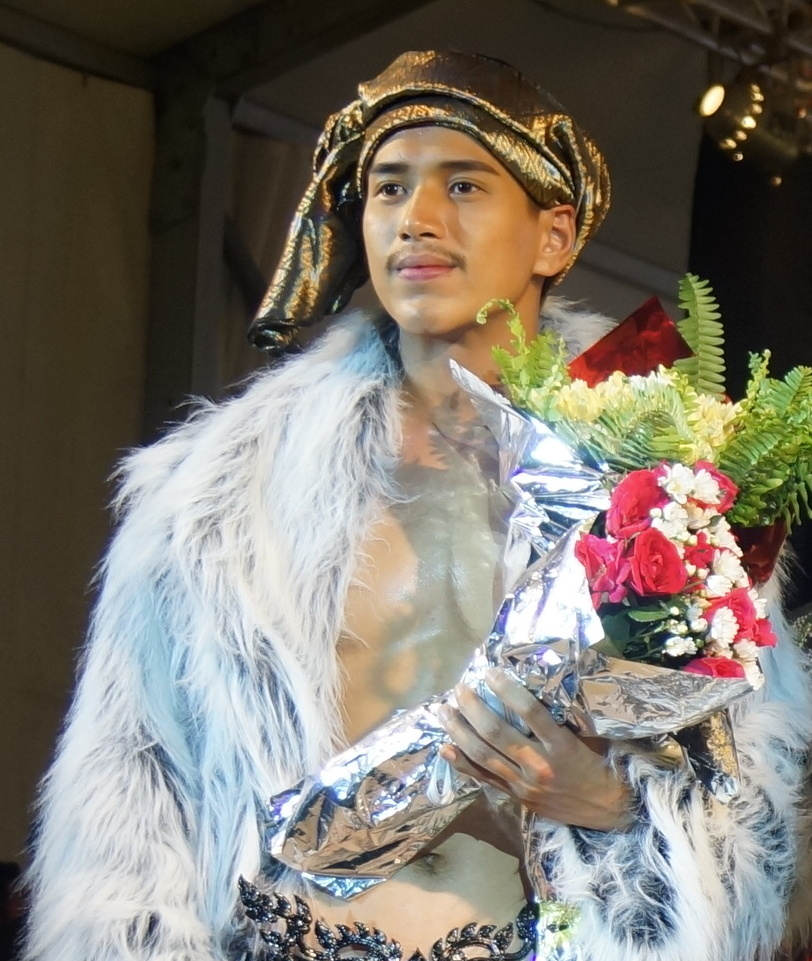
- Lin at Myanmar International Fashion Week 2016
- Born: Aung Ye Lin; June 19, 1988 (age 38); Rangoon, Burma
- Occupation: Actor • model
- Years active: 2005–present

Aung Ye Lin (Burmese: အောင်ရဲလင်း; born 19 June 1988) is a Burmese actor and model.

== Early life and education ==
Aung Ye Lin was born on 19 June 1988 in Yangon, Myanmar. He is the youngest child among two siblings, having an older brother named Phyo Ye Lin. From 1995 to 1998, he attended Basic Education High School No. 2 Kamayut (St. Augustine), moving to Basic Education High School No. 3 Dagon for his secondary education and higher education.

== Career ==
In 2005, he joined John Lwin's model training. Since then, he took professional training in modelling and catwalk. He began his entertainment career as a runway model as part of the John Lwin's John International Modeling Agency with countless advertising shows and runways that had been walked on. In 2006, he joined the Snow White film production and studied acting. His hard work as a model and acting in commercials was noticed by the film industry and soon, film casting offers came rolling in.

He made his acting debut in 2010 with a leading role in the film Yay Thu Ma (The Mermaid), alongside Thinzar Wint Kyaw and Soe Pyae Thazin, directed by Kyi Phyu Shin.

== Filmography ==
=== Film ===
- Moe Nya Einmet Myu ( 2009 )
- A Lann Zayar 2 ( 2013 )
- Thet Tan Thit ( 2014 )
- A Thet Ko A Thet Htet Po Ywae Chit The ( 2014 )
- My Lovely Hate ( 2016 )
- Wit Nyin Ka Kyoe ( 2017 )
- A Way Chit ( 2018 )
- Shal Chway Ma ( 2018 )
- Kiss Like Wine ( 2018 )
- My Country My Home ( 2018 )
- Nge Kyun ( 2018 )
- Ma Ta Htaung Ta Kaung Bwar ( 2018 )
- Shel Chway Ma ( 2018 )
- Mhar Tae Back Ka Nay Kyi Bar (2019)
- Kaung Kin Ta Khu A Loh Shi The ( 2019 )
- Rose Castle ( 2020 )
- Ohn Pwa ( 2020 )
- Ah Cho Sone Ah Chit Ah Pyinn Sone Ah Hsait ( 2022 )
- English Kyat Pha Bo Kyat Pha ( 2023 )
- The Alphabet I Hate ( 2023 )
- Thar Chaw ( 2026 )
- Ta Tha Tha ( TBA )

=== Television series ===
- Lwan Lo Ma Kyan Yit Say Lo (2023)
- Sparkle Hearts (2023)
- Ah Mone Myit Kan Par ( 2024 )
- A Vague Dream ( 2024 )
- Ma Chit Thint Thaw ( 2025 )
