= Ei Chaw Po =

Burmese actress, model and singer

- အိချောပို
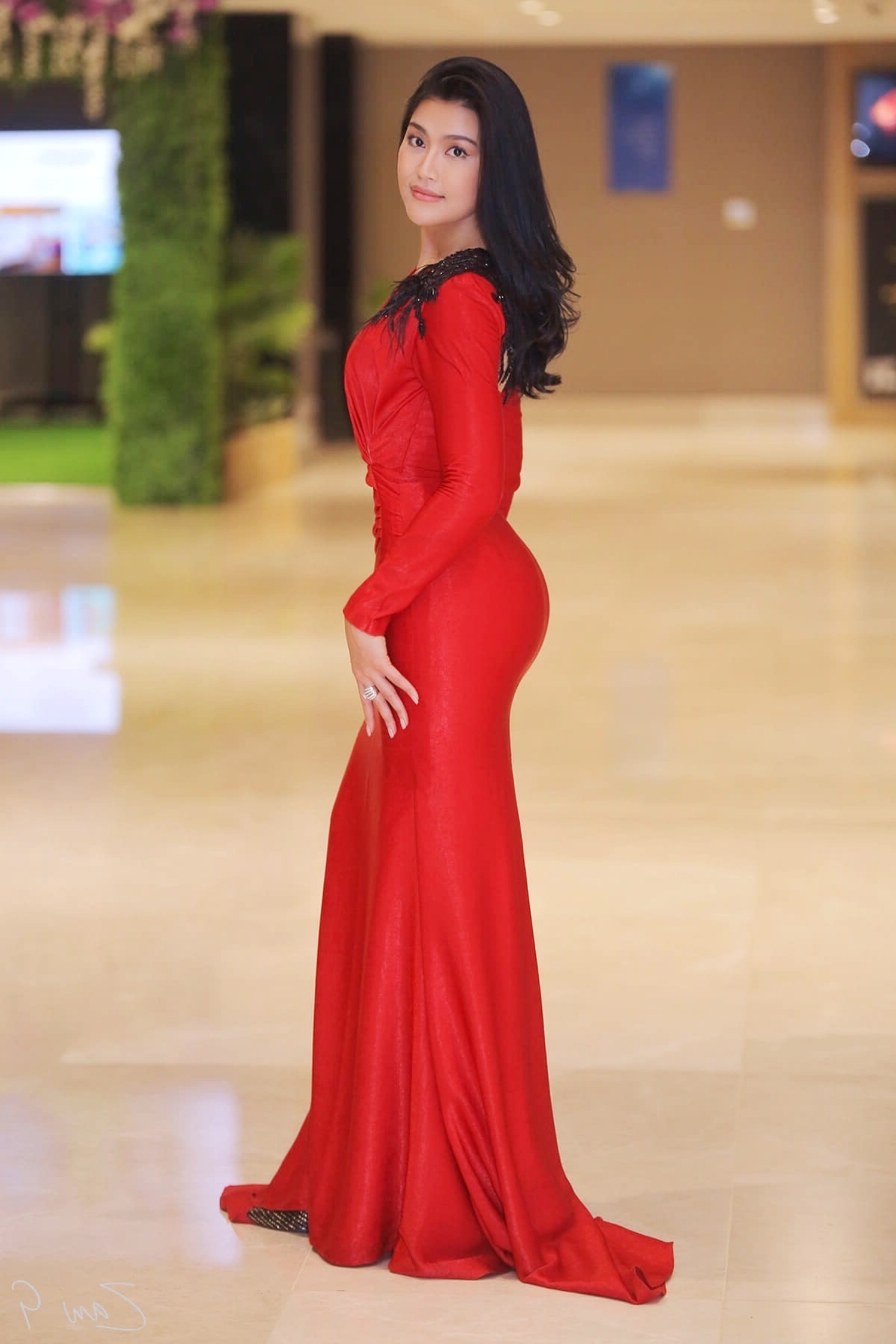
- Ei Chaw Po in 2019
- Born: Ei Chaw Po; 3 January 1990 (age 36); Paung, Myanmar
- Other name: Suu Suu
- Education: National University of Arts and Culture, Yangon
- Occupations: Actress; Model; Singer
- Years active: 2006–present
- Height: 5 ft 7 in (1.70 m)
- Spouse: Moses Mone
- Parent(s): Cho Maung; Thida San

Ei Chaw Po (Burmese: အိချောပို; born 3 January 1990) is a Burmese actress, model and singer of Mon descent. She is one of the most successful actresses in Burmese cinema and is among the highest-paid performers in the industry. She has received three nominations for Best Actress at the Myanmar Academy Awards in 2016, 2017, and 2018. Over the course of her film career, she has appeared in more than 250 films..

== Early life and education ==
Ei Chaw Po was born on 3 January 1990 in Paung, to ethnic Mon parents Cho Maung and Thida San. She is the second child among three siblings, having an older brother, Ye Min Oo and a younger sister, Ei Thiri Cho Maung. She attended high school at Basic Education High School No. 2 Kamayut. She was picked as the "Queen" (beauty queen) as a freshman at the university. She graduated with a BA cinematography and drama in 2010, and Music diploma in 2012 from National University of Arts and Culture, Yangon.

== Career ==
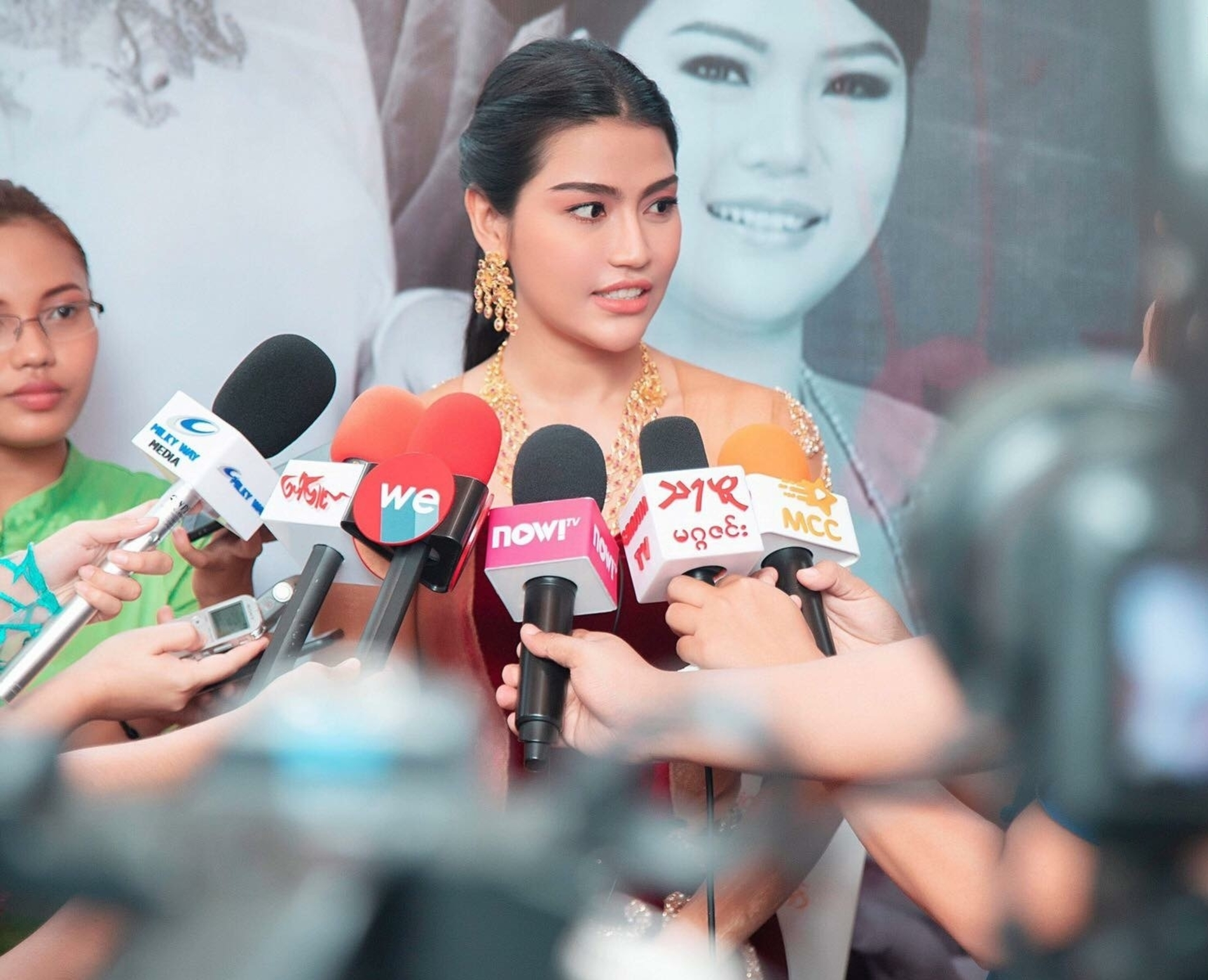
Ei Chaw Po media interview

Ei Chaw Po initiated her modeling career in 2006, gracing numerous local magazine covers. In 2008, she participated in local pageant contests, securing victories in various competitions and attaining continental titles, including Miss TRI 2008, Miss Sick & Shine 2008, Miss Smooth E 2008, and Miss Seven Days 2008.

In 2010, she was selected as an actress in the new face actor choice contest TV program Anu Phin Nyar Pyo Khin. She made her acting debut with a main role in the film Hla Pa Thaw Wut (Pretty Karma) in 2010. She then starred in the film York Kyar Ko Yaung Sar Mal (I Gonna Sell My Husband!), where she played the leading role for the first time with Pyay Ti Oo. The film was both a domestic hit and led to increased recognition for Ei Chaw Po.

In 2014, she embarked on her first major leading role on the big screen in the romance film Shwe Dingar Ko Htwe Khinn Ka Sar Mal, alongside Nay Toe. She has been nominated three times for Best Actress at the Myanmar Academy Award for the years 2016, 2017, and 2018. From 2010 to the present, she has featured in over 50 big-screen films and a total of over 200 films.

In 2017, she took on the female lead role in the big-screen film Kyway alongside Hlwan Paing and Tyron Bejay. In 2018, she starred in the big-screen film Houk Ser, playing the lead role alongside Myint Myat and Kyaw Kyaw Bo.

== Music career ==
Ei Chaw Po is also actively involved as a solo singer. She began her singing career in 2013 and contributed to group albums such as "Shwe Thachin Myar Nae Pyan Than Chin" (Flying with the Golden Songs) in 2015 and "VeVe 20th Anniversary" in 2016. A notable song of hers from the VeVe group album is "A Lo Chin Sone Sanda" (The Most Desire).

Later on, she released her inaugural single, "Gypsy Boy", in 2018. The single, performed in collaboration with her younger sister, Ei Thiri Cho Maung, gained widespread popularity on the day of its release on her official Facebook page and YouTube channel. Since 2016, Ei Chaw Po has actively participated as a singer in Thingyan music concerts annually. She is currently working towards producing and distributing her solo album, which is anticipated to be released soon.

== Advertisement ==
In 2014, Ei Chaw Po was featured in a video advertisement for Myanmar Awzar Fertilizer alongside actor Nay Toe. She became a brand ambassador for VeVe in 2016.

== Personal life ==
Ei Chaw Po is married to Moses Mone, a mixed Chin-Kachin businessman and the son of former police lieutenant chief Yahlyan Mone (ရာလ်လျန်မှုန်း). The wedding took place on 17 November 2023, on Phuket Island, Thailand.

== Filmography ==
=== Film (Cinema) ===
Over 50 films, including

- Shwe Dingar Ko Htwe Khinn Ka Sar Mal (ရွှေဒင်္ဂါးကိုထွေခင်းကစားမယ်) (2014)
- 3Girls (သရဲမ၊ဘီလူးမနှင့်မိန်းမပျို) (2017)
- Kyway (ကြွေ) (2018)
- Tasay Par Lar Pyi (တစ္ဆေပါလာပြီ) (2018)
- Chu Si (ချူဆီ) (2017)
- Houk Ser (ဟောက်စား) (2019)
- LadyBoy (2019)
- A Chit Sone Crush? (အချစ်ဆုံးCrush?)(2019)
- Players (ပလေယာ) (2020)

=== Film ===
Over 200 films, including

- Hla Pa Thaw Wut (လှပသောဝဋ်) (2010)
- York Kyar Ko Yaung Sar Mal (ယောက်ျားကိုရောင်းစားမယ်) (2010)

=== Television series ===
- Pin Lal Gyi Yae A Pyone (2022)

== Discography ==
=== Singles ===
- Gypsy Boy (2018)

=== Songs from collaborative albums ===
- Dar Thwar Htet Ka Pyar Yay Sat (Shwe Thachin Myar Nae Pyan Than Chin) (2015)
- A Lo Chin Sone Sanda (VeVe 20th Anniversary) (2016)
