= Nay Toe =

Arakanese actor (born 1981)

- Burmese: နေတိုး
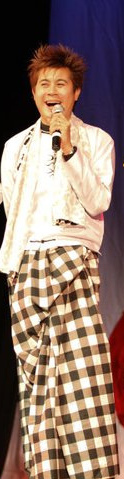
- Nay Toe in 2011
- Born: Nay Lin Aung; 9 September 1981 (age 45); Taw Htu Village Manaung, Arakan State
- Other names: Zin Min, Nyi Toe, Hein Zaw, Ko Latt, Lu Ni
- Occupations: Actor; model; comedian; singer
- Spouse: Thae Su Myat Shwe (m. 2022)
- Children: Gon Shein Toe (son)
- Parents: U Aung Than (father); Daw Than Myaing (mother)
- Relatives: Zaw Lin Aung (brother); Min Thway (brother); Su Mon Aung (sister)
- Awards: Myanmar Motion Picture Academy Awards (Best Actor for 2009, 2015, 2017, 2024); Star Award (Best Actor Award for 2019); Myanmar Pride Award (Best actor for multiple roles 2020)

Nay Toe (Burmese: နေတိုး; pronounced [nè tó]; born Nay Lin Aung (Burmese: နေလင်းအောင်; pronounced [lɪ́ɰ̃ aʊɰ̃]; on 9 September 1981) is a Rakhine film actor and comedian with the Burmese traditional anyeint troupe Htawara Hninzi. He won Myanmar Motion Picture Academy Awards for Best Actor four times: in 2009 with Moe Nya Einmet Myu, in 2015 with Nat Khat Mhar Tae Tite Pwal, in 2017 with Tar Tay Gyi and in 2024 with Bound. He also won the Star Award for the film Bridge of Clouds in 2018. He is one of the highest-paid actors in Myanmar.

== Early life ==
Nay Toe was born on 9 September 1981 in Tawhtu village in Manaung Township, Cheduba Island, to ethnic Rakhine parents, U Aung Than and Daw Than Myaing. He is the second child of four siblings. His younger brother Min Thway is also an actor. He began his career as a model and eventually transitioned to cinema. He graduated from Yangon University with a B.Sc. in mathematics.

== Career ==
Nay Toe moved to Yangon in 1999, where he joined the YIIK modeling agency and took singing lessons. He gained some titles in modeling contests. He modeled under the name Zin Min.

He released an album in 2000, but without any success.

He starred in music videos and began exploring acting. In 2001, he starred in his first movie, 3 Weeks.

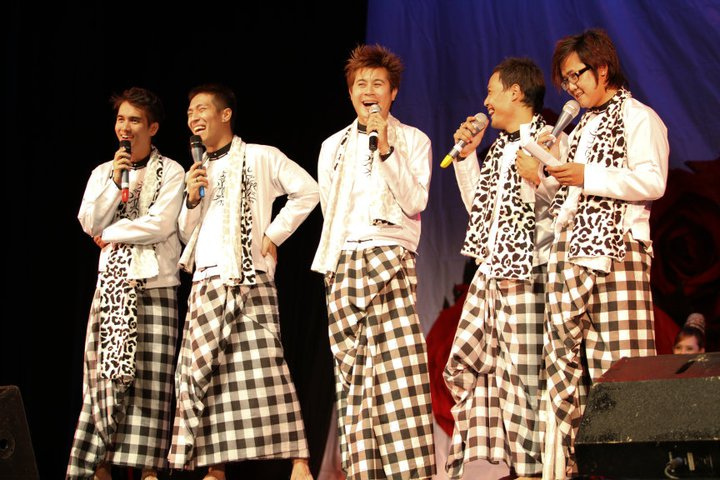
Nay Toe performing a comedy routine with Eternal Rose Anyeint in Singapore on 6 March 2011.

Since 2007, Nay Toe has been acting with the Htawara Hninzi (Eternal Rose) Burmese cultural dance show, in which he is one of the supporting comedians, along with Tun Tun, Moe Moe, Ye Lay and Kyaw Kyaw Bo. The director of the show is Maung Myo Min.

In 2011, he won an academy award for Best Leading Actor for his role in Moe Nya Einmet Myu. His role in the movie was said to be intricate, as the character he portrayed was suffering from multiple personality disorder and displayed three different personalities throughout the story.

== Other projects ==
=== Television commercials ===
Nay Toe has appeared in several television commercials, including those for Myanmar Airways International, soft drinks, jewelry stores, fashion, and sports apparel.

=== Publications ===
Nay Toe released his autobiography and fashion book, Un Tightened Doors (ေစ့ထားေသာ တံခါးမ်ား), on 1 January 2011. The 21 chapters of the book review both his career and his personal life, including a large photo gallery. The book focuses on his religious insight into Buddhism as a devoted Buddhist.

=== Entertainment tours ===
Nay Toe traveled to Japan, Singapore and Malaysia in 2011 on entertainment tours. He has also been invited to Australia, Singapore, London, Malaysia, Japan and New Zealand.

== Humanitarian work ==
Nay Toe's humanitarian work includes raising funds for those affected by the cyclones Nargis and Giri. He has also participated in various charity shows held in Burma and overseas. He donated to several retirement homes and orphanages as a celebration of winning the Academy Award in January 2011 in place of holding a lavish party. For his 30th birthday, he sponsored a place of worship in the center of his hometown.

== Personal life ==
=== Personality ===
Nay Toe is introverted, reserved and reticent in nature; people often mistake him for being arrogant. This aura of coldness is how he got his nickname, "Ice Prince".

=== Relationships ===
He married Thae Su Myat Shwe on 5 February 2022, at their house in Yangon. Now, he has a son named Gon Shein Toe.

=== Hobbies and interests ===
Nay Toe has revealed his artistic ability and has held an interest in crafts since he was young, especially in paintings and sculptures. His favorite painting techniques are watercolor and acrylic. He has won prizes for his drawings and sculptures since primary school. Other hobbies include reading, photography, music and travelling. His favorite sport is swimming, and he also plays tennis and golf occasionally.

=== Religion ===
Nay Toe is known for being a pious Theravada Buddhist.

In his 2011 biography Un Tightened Doors, four chapters are devoted to his religious beliefs: Buddhist teachings that inspired him, and his experience and thoughts on Vipassanā meditation.

Nay Toe described Buddha as the most respectable and inspirational person in his life in the chapter "Character in My Religious Sight". In another chapter, "The Most Important Movie of Life from Vipassanā Point of View", he mentioned Vipassanā as a director of life that can guide people to achieve their inner peace and liberation, eventually attaining enlightenment through Vipassanā. In the chapter "Standard of Life", he emphasizes his belief that one's standard of life is determined by having knowledge of and practicing Vipassanā meditation rather than materialistic possession. In the "Vipassanā and Me" chapter, Nay Toe elaborates on why and how he practices Vipassanā meditation.

== Filmography ==
=== Film ===
List of films
Year	Film	Director	Co-stars
2005	Mingalaba	Mee Pwar	Sai Sai Kham Leng, Myo Sandi Kyaw
2006	Pan Pyo Thu To Alinkar	Hein Soe	Lu Min, Nawarat, May Thinzar Oo
2007	Moe Paw Khone Tat Ka Lite Chin Par Tal	Nyunt Myanmar Nyi Nyi Aung	Htun Htun, Ye Lay, Eaindra Kyaw Zin
2007	Wingaba Achit Nit Thu Ei Achit Ko Ko Chit	Thein Han	Min Maw Kynn, Eaindra Kyaw Zin, Thinzar Wint Kyaw
2007	Who is this man?	Nyi Nyi Htun Lwin	Eaindra Kyaw Zin
2008	Academy Shock	Nyi Nyi Htun Lwin	Ye Aung, Htun Htun, Eaindra Kyaw Zin, Thinzar Wint Kyaw, Chaw Yadanar
2008	Myint Mo Htet Ka Tha Ya Phu	Thein Han	Moh Moh Myint Aung, Htun Htun
2009	101 Nights with Mother-in-Law	Mee Pwar	Ye Aung, Soe Myat Thuzar, Soe Pyae Thazin
2009	Chit Lote Sa Tar	Thein Han	Kyaw Ye Aung, Eaindra Kyaw Zin, Tint Tint Tun
2009	Kyo Kyar Taung Pan Khat Than	Sin Yaw Mg Mg	Kyaw Kyaw Bo, Eaindra Kyaw Zin, Wyne Su Khine Thein, Moe Yu San
2009	Moe Nya Einmet Myu	Kyi Phyu Shin	Moe Hay Ko, Thinzar Wint Kyaw, Soe Pyae Thazin
2009	Mommy Shein	Nyi Nyi Htun Lwin	Yan Aung, Eaindra Kyaw Zin, Thinzar wint Kyaw
2009	Zaw Ka Ka Nay The	Mee Pwar	Nandar Hlaing, Min Thway
2010	Burmeton	Khin Maung Oo, Soe Thein Htut	Yan Aung, Htun Eaindra Bo, Thet Mon Myint
2010	New Model	Nyunt Myanmar Nyi Nyi Aung	Yan Aung, May Than Nu, Soe Myat Thuzar, Thinzar Wint Kyaw
2010	Good Shea Ta Met	Nyi Nyi Htun Lwin	Yan Aung, Ye Aung, May Thinzar Oo, Soe Moe Kyi, Kyaw Kyaw Bo, Moe Hay Ko
2010	Lar Htar Arr Bwarr (1)	Ko Zaw (Arr Youn Oo)	Wai Lu Kyaw, Nyi Nanda, Christina, Thet Mon Myint
2011	Falan Falan Phyit Dae A Chit	Nyi Nyi Htun Lwin	Yan Aung, Moht Moht Myint Aung, Eaindra Kyaw Zin
2011	Lar Htar Arr Bwarr (2)	Ko Zaw (Arr Youn Oo)	Wai Lu Kyaw, Soe Myat Nandar, Thet Mon Myint
2011	Change	Thein Han	Kyaw Kyaw Bo, Eaindra Kyaw Zin
2012	A Lan Lun A Lun Lan	Nyi Nyi Htun Lwin	Wutt Hmone Shwe Yi, Melody, Christina, Thinzar Wint Kyaw, Soe Pyae Thazin, Nan Su Yati Soe, Chan Mi Mi Ko
2012	Aungmyin Kyawkyar Suusha Htetmyat	Nyi Nyi Tun Lwin	Ei Chaw Po, Yu Thandar Tin, Shwe Hmone Yati, Chan Mi Mi Ko
2013	White Castle	Ko Zaw (Arr Yone Oo)	Pyay Ti Oo, Eaindra Kyaw Zin, Yoon Yoon
2013	A Htar A Thit Nae Hna Khar Chit Mal	Nyi Nyi Htun Lwin	Min Maw Kun, Wutt Hmone Shwe Yi, Chit Thu Wai
2013	12 Nar Ye Tha Tot Thar	Nyi Nyi Htun Lwin	Thet Mon Myint
2013	Satan's Dancer	Wyne	Thet Mon Myint
2014	39 Bite Pu	Nyunt Myanmar Nyi Nyi Aung	Wutt Hmone Shwe Yi, Wai Lu Kyaw, Chaw Yadanar, Soe Myat Thuzar
2014	Mar Yar Project	Wyne	Thet Mon Myint, Phway Phway
2014	Black Sheep	Win Tun Tun	Thet Mon Myint, Khine Thin Kyi, Thinzar Wint Kyaw
2014	Ko Tint Toh Super Yat Kwat	Kyaw Zaw Lin	Many actors
2015	Online Paw Ka Wit Nyin	Nyi Nyi Htun Lwin	Phway Phway, Zay Ye Htet, Chan Mi Mi Ko, Aung Lwin, Nay San, Soe Moe Kyi
2015	I'm Rose, Darling	Wyne	Phway Phway, Yoon Yoon, Heavy Phyo
2015	Slaves of Cupid	Wyne	Sai Sai Kham Leng, Phway Phway
2015	Nat Khat Mhar Tae Tite Pwal	Nyunt Myanmar Nyi Nyi Aung	Thet Mon Myint, Yadanar Phyu Phyu Aung
2016	Oak Kyar Myet Pauk	Nyunt Myanmar Nyi Nyi Aung	Nay Min, Htun Htun, Thet Mon Myint
2016	A Chit Sit	Thein Han	Shwe Hmone Yati, Hsu Myat Noe Oo
2016	Anubis	Lu Min	Lu Min, Shwe Hmone Yati, Hsu Myat Noe Oo
2016	From Bangkok to Mandalay	Chartchai Ketnust	Sai Sai Kham Leng, Wutt Hmone Shwe Yi, Nan Wun
2016	Shwe Din Gar Ko Htway Khinn Ka Sar Mal	Nyi Nyi Htun Lwin	Ei Chaw Po, Nay San, Kyaw Kyaw
2017	La Yaung Phyar Tae Inle Mhar	Nyunt Myanmar Nyi Nyi Aung	Wutt Hmone Shwe Yi, Wah Zin
2017	Kyun	Nyunt Myanmar Nyi Nyi Aung	Myint Myat, Wutt Hmone Shwe Yi
2017	Kyauk Kyauk Kyauk	Aww Ratha	Htun Htun, Min Thway, Kyaw Kyaw, Khin Wint Wah, Nan Myat Phyo Thin, Nan Khin Zayar
2017	Aung Say Paing Say	Maung Myo Min	Lu Min, Nyi Htut Kaung, Ei Chaw Po, Khine Thin Kyi, Min Yaza
2017	Tar Tay Gyi	Wyne	Shwe Thamee
2017	Eternal Mother	Sin Yaw Maung Maung	May Than Nu, Ye Aung, Wutt Hmone Shwe Yi
2018	Mway Chat Ka Taw Lon Lonn Tal	Kyaw Zaw Lin	Thet Mon Myint, Aung Lwin, War War Aung
2018	Koe Zat Lann Mar Ko Thar Zat Lite		Htun Htun, Wutt Hmone Shwe Yi
2018	Bridge of Clouds	Aww Ya Tha	Htun Htun, Khin Wint Wah
2018	Mone Lote Ya Yin Mone Chin Tal	Aung Zaw Lin	Min Oo, Thinzar Wint Kyaw, Yadanar My
2018	T Kyat	Steel (Dwe Myittar)	Thinzar Wint Kyaw, Shwe Thamee, May Myat Noe, Nang Khin Zay Yar, Yin Let
2018	A Mone Tway Khauk Htar Lite	Thar Nyi	Moe Hay Ko
2018	Mi	Na Gyi	Paing Phyo Thu, Ye Aung, Min Oo
2018	Clinging with Hate	Aww Ratha	Min Thway, Kyaw Kyaw Bo, Phway Phway, Aye Wutyi Thaung
2018	Killing Field	Thar Nyi	Min Thway, Si Phyo, Nay Ye, Htoo Char, Paing Phyo Thu, Thet Mon Myint
2019	Tar Too	Kyaw Zaw Lin	Thet Mon Myint, Lwin Moe
2019	Pyone Shwan Yay Pyaw Ye Lar	Win Tun Tun	Shwe Hmone Yati, Aye Myat Thu, Kyaw Kyaw Bo
2019	Nha Par Thwar Update	Kyaw Zaw Lin	Wutt Hmone Shwe Yi, Aung Lwin
2019	The Dark Cinema	Pyae Zaw Phyo	Kyaw Kyaw Bo, Min Thway, Riya Ray
2019	Responsible Citizen	Steel (Dwe Myittar)	Min Thway, Min Maw Kun, Htun Htun, Nay Htet Lin
2019	A Htet Tan Sar	Nay Paing	Nyi Htut Khaung, Myat Kay Thi Aung
2019	Sponsor	Aung Zaw Lin	Paing Phyo Thu, Ye Lay, Myat Kay Thi Aung, Kyaw Kyaw, Zin Wine
2019	The Greatest Love	Pwint Theingi Zaw	Nay Chi Oo, Soe Myat Thuzar, Ye Aung
2019	Box No. 88	Win Lwin Htet	Eaindra Kyaw Zin, Htun Htun, Thar Nyi, Jenny
2019	Bo Nay Toe	Steel (Dwe Myittar)	Thet Mon Myint, Paing Phyo Thu, Nay Myo Aung, Tun Ko Ko, Min Oo, Nay Ye
2019	Chi	Nyunt Myanmar Nyi Nyi Aung	Thet Mon Myint, Shwe Thamee
2019	Kyauk Kyauk Kyauk 2: Journey to the Death	Aww Ratha	May Myint Mo, Nan Su Oo, Htun Htun
2020	Myet Nu	Pwint Theingi Zaw	Wutt Hmone Shwe Yi
2020	Ywar Zaw Gyi	Kyaw Zaw Lin	Eaindra Kyaw Zin, Nay Naw, Yoon Shwe Yi
2023	Never Give Up	Steel (Dwe Myittar)	Nay Myo Aung, Htun Ko Ko, Soe Myat Thuzar
2023	Thel Thel Lote	Kyaw Zaw Lin	Kyaw Htet Zaw, Soe Myat Thuzar, Shwe Hmone Yati
2023	Overdue Rain	Nay Hein	Moe Hay Ko, Ye Aung
2024	Lar Khaw Thu	Aww Ratha	Yair Yint Aung, Than Thar Moe Theint
2024	Bound	Aww Ratha	Naw Phaw Eh Htar, Poe Mamhe Thar
2024	Dream Rhyme	Win Lwin Htet	Hlwan Paing, Ni Ni Khin Zaw
2025	Ghost Movie	Khin Hlaing	Kyaw Kyaw Bo, Wai Lar Ri
2025	Yauk Kyar tway ko sate Kone tal	Ko Zaw	Chaw Yadanar, Naw Phaw Eh Htar, Moe Pyae Pyae Maung
2025	Nganawin Nga Toe	Soe Moe Min	Si Phyo, Hein Thiha, Htet Htet Htun, Chue Sitt Han
2025	Aung Si Aung Maung	Khin Hlaing	Phyo Ngwe Soe, Tyron Bejay, Phyo Lay, Naw Phaw Eh Htar, Nay Chi Shoon Lak
2025	Night Mingalar	D D Htet Aung	Soe Myat Thuzar, Shwe Thamee, Yadanar Bo, Yamone Myint Myat
2026	Michelle (မီချယ်)	Mae Min Bon	San Htate Htar Oo, Chaw Yadanar, Yadanar Bo, Hsu Eaint San, Cho Pyone
2026	Magic Mask	Aww Yatha	Kyaw Kyaw Bo, Yadanar Bo
2026	Nyo Ki Doh	Win Lwin Htet	Myint Myat, Soe Myat Thuzar, Melody, Khin Wint Wah
2026	Pho Kauk	Mae Min Bon	Shein Tint Htoo, Nyi Nanda, Nay Myo Aung, Khin Wint Wah, Lin Zarni Zaw
2026	Phwar Phat Taw	Steel	Htun Htun, Shwe Thamee
2026	Love Price	Pyae Phyo Naing	Nine Nine, Wutt Hmone Shwe Yi, Chaw Yadanar

=== Series ===
Year	Series	Burmese title	Director	Co-stars
2025	"Equal Love"	"အချစ်ညီမျှခြင်း"	Win Lwin Htet	Ye Lay, May Than Nu, San Yati Moe Myint, Poe Mamhe Thar
2025	Yay Sat Toh The Lal Ta Khar Ta Yan Ma Sone See Thar	"ရေစက်တို့သည်လည်း... တစ်ခါတစ်ရံမဆုံဆည်းသာ..."	Pyae Phyo Naing	Thu Htoo Zan, Aye Myat Thu, Naw Phaw Eh Htar, Khant Kyaw, Thoon Kyal Zin

=== Direct-to-video ===
Nay Toe has starred in over one hundred direct-to-video films since 2001. The following is a list of these works.

Lists of Videos
Year	Title	Director	Co-Stars
2001–2010	7 Times Two	Khin Saw Myo	Kyaw Thu, Khant Si Thu, May Than Nu
2001–2010	A Chit Myo A Lon		Eaindra Kyaw Zin, Khin Lay New
2001–2010	A Mone Pyu Sar Tat A Chit		Soe Myat Nandar, Soe Pyae Thazin
2001–2010	A Mone Thu Htay Ma Lay	Htoo Thar	Myo Sandi Kyaw
2001–2010	A Mone Yaw Kyay	Okkar Bo	Htet Htet Moe Oo, Ye Aung
2001–2010	A Nan Sat Taing	Ko Zaw	Eindra Kyaw Zin
2001–2010	A Phyu Htel 528	Mg Myo Min	Htun Aeindra Bo
2001–2010	A Pywt Swel	Ag Ba Power	Thet Mon Myint
2001–2010	A Seit Thint Lay Hnin	Myo Htoo	Nawarat
2001–2010	A Sone That (The End)	Myo Htoo	Moe Hay Ko
2001–2010	A Tar A See Melt Tein	Okkar Bo	Myat Kaythi Aung, Nawarat
2001–2010	A Thit Phit Thwar Thaw Yin Khone Than	ko Zaw	Thet Mon Myint
2001–2010	Achit Cho Cho Tha Met Khar Khar	Okkar Bo	Htun Htun, Eindra Kyaw Zin
2001–2010	Amara Kainnayee Ma Di ThanBula	Nyi Nyi Aung	Soe Myat Nandar, Chit Thu Wei
2001–2010	Amay Shae Mhar Ba Shaw Shi Tal	Okkar Bo	Chaw Yadana, Chit Snow Oo
2001–2010	Ba Kyaw	Okkar Bo	Myo Sandi Kyaw
2001–2010	Bar Nyar Ahtar	Aryu	Moe Moe, Moe Hay Ko
2001–2010	Bay Der Pyan Ean Ko Khel	Htoo Thar	Htun Htun Win, May Thinzar Oo
2001–2010	Bond		Moe Hay Ko
2001–2010	Caution: 528		Khaing Thin Kyi
2001–2010	Chair Wheel		Pearl Win, Thinzar Wint Kyaw
2001–2010	Chan Thar Lar Pyi	Phay Chit	Su Pan Htwar
2001–2010	Chit Chin Arr Phyit	Kyaw Zaw Lin	Eindra Kyaw Zin, Ye Aung, May Thinzar Oo
2001–2010	Chit Chin Ei 360 Degree	Nyi Nyi Htun Lwin	Lu Min, Eindra Kyaw Zin, Su Pan Htwar
2001–2010	Chit Kyee Ya Aung	Hein Soe	Moe Hay Ko
2001–2010	Chit Lite Ya Tar Lat Kone Pel	Kyaw Zaw Lin	Thet Mon Myint
2001–2010	Chit Thu Editor		Soe Myat Thuzar
2001–2010	Cinderella Ka Kyo	Nay Paing	Eindra Kyaw Zin
2001–2010	Director	Ag Ba Power	Eindra Kyaw Zin
2001–2010	Dragon Road	Mg Tin Oo	Kyaw Ye Aung, Mo Mo Myit Aung, Khaing Thin Kyi
2001–2010	Einmet Ma Hote Thaw Ma Nat Phan Myar	Denny	Su Pan Htwar
2001–2010	Ein Mat Lady		Yan Aung, Soe Myat Thuzar
2001–2010	Emo Bangkok		Eindra Kyaw Zin, Bay Lu Wa
2001–2010	Gipsy	Wyne (Own Creator)	Min Thway, Moe Hay Ko
2001–2010	History of Two Parallel Lines	Aung Kyaw Min	Myo Sandi Kyaw
2001–2010	Hna Lone Thar Se Yin Khan	Wyne	Eindra Kyaw Zin
2001–2010	Hna Lone Thar Young Sone	Zaw Sat	Su Pan Htwar, Pearl Win, Pwint Nadi Maung
2001–2010	Hnin Khar	Wyne (Own Creator)	Pan Phyu, Pearl Win
2001–2010	Hnin Sat Ka Kyo		Nawarat
2001–2010	Hnin Si Ngo Tat Nay	Myo Htoo	Nawarat
2001–2010	Hote Nay Tar Pel	Mee Pwar	Thet Mon Myint, Thinzar Wint Kyaw
2001–2010	Htar Wa Ya	Mee Pwar	Min Maw Kon, Nine Nine, Nay Myo Aung, Myint Myat, Eaindra Kyaw Zin, Thazin
2001–2010	Htat Tu Ma Shi	Okkar Bo	Pan Phyu, Wyne Su Khaing Thein
2001–2010	Htaung Chauk	Okkar Bo	Yaza Ne Win, Su Pan Htwar, Pearl Win
2001–2010	Irraweddy Yel Ma Nat Phyan	Zinyaw Maung Maung	Kyaw Ye Aung, Eindra Kyaw Zin
2001–2010	Ka Bar Gyi (The World)		Khin Lay Nwe
2001–2010	Ka Byar Ma Mhi Tat A Chit	Ko Zaw	Eindra Kyaw Zin
2001–2010	Kar La Paw Att Kyaung	Win Htun Htun	Yan Aung, Thet Mon Myint
2001–2010	Kaung Kin Aut Ka Sone Hmat	Ko Zaw	Eindra Kyaw Zin
2001–2010	Kha Yee Kyan Lan		
2001–2010	Khay Yel	Mee Pwar	Aye Myat Thu
2001–2010	Kyar Ta Kaung Yet A Seit	Maung Dawna	Min Oo, Htun Aeindra Bo
2001–2010	Kyauk Lite Kya Sot Thu Nge Chin	Mg Myo Min	Nandar Hlaing
2001–2010	Kyay Sar	Nay Naw	Moe Hay Ko
2001–2010	La Min Thit Pin	Aung Kyaw Zaw	Eindra Kyaw Zin, May Than Nu
2001–2010	La Min Tike Pwel	Myo Htoo	Yadana Khin
2001–2010	Lan Pya Par	Okkar Bo	Yadana Khin, Wyne Su Khaing Thein
2001–2010	Lat Phaung Ba Hein	Hein Zaw	Khin Lay Nwe
2001–2010	Late Pyar Lwan Chin	Myo Htoo	Khaing Hnin Wei
2001–2010	Law Ka Hnin Dan	Myo Htoo	Pan Phyu, Khin Lay Nwe
2001–2010	Legend of a Phoenix	Ko Zaw	Nawarat
2001–2010	Loot Tet Ngar	Maung Yu Ya	Pwint Nadi Maung
2001–2010	Ma Chit Tat Thu Chin	Ko Zaw	Su Pan Htwar, Thinzar Wint Kyaw
2001–2010	Ma Kyay Nyar Kyay	Thar Gyi	Thet Mon Myint, Thazin
2001–2010	Ma Mone Myat Phay	Moe Aung	Mo Mo Myint Aung, May Thinzar Oo, Wyne Su Khaing Thein
2001–2010	Ma Way Tot Bu		Soe Myat Nandar, Hnin Wut Yi Thaung
2001–2010	Maya Einmet	Htoo Thar	Myo Sandi Kyaw
2001–2010	Maya Me Mya	Moe Aung	Khaing Thin Kyi
2001–2010	Maung	Zinyaw Maung Maung	Eindra Kyaw Zin
2001–2010	Mee Tain Tike		Thet Mon Myint
2001–2010	Mhar Taw Pone, Sar Twe Si	Aung Kyaw Zaw	Yadana Khin, Chaw Yadana
2001–2010	Moe Ma Myin Lay Ma Myin	Moe Aung	Thet Mon Myint
2001–2010	Moe Yay Htel Mhr Ngo	Win Htun Htun	Min Hein, Thet Mon Myint, May Thinzar Oo
2001–2010	Mone Taing Twe Lel Ngo	Mee Pwar	Kyaw Kyaw Bo, Thet Mon Myint
2001–2010	Mone De	Win Htun Htun	Eindra Kyaw Zin
2001–2010	Mote Sate Pyar Swell	Khin Mg Oo	Ye Aung, Su Pan Htwar
2001–2010	Mway	Mee Pwar	Thinza Wint Kyaw, Pearl Win
2001–2010	Mya Kyay Ta Mar		Eindra Kyaw Zin
2001–2010	Myar Nat Mg Yat Chit Pone Pyin	Mee Pwar	Eindra Kyaw Zin
2001–2010	Myat Yay Khat Tel Coffee	Win Htun Htun	Nawarat
2001–2010	Myat Yay Shin Tan	Zaw Sat	Soe Myat Nandar
2001–2010	Mysterious Angles	Myo Min	Thet Mon Myint
2001–2010	Na Mu Nar Pay Toe	Ag Ba Power	Nawarat
2001–2010	Nar Kyin Minute	Wyne (Own Creator)	Soe Myat Nandar, Moe Hay Ko
2001–2010	Nar Lel Pay Par Mya Thida	Zaw Sat	Khaing Thin Kyi
2001–2010	Nat Shine Thitsar	Lwin Min	Soe Myat Thuzar, Thinzar Wint Kyaw
2001–2010	Nat The Mee Chit Tat Pin Lel	Maung Aung	Pearl Win, Wut Hmone Shwe Yi
2001–2010	Naut Sone Ka Byar	Min Htin Koko Gyi	Eindra Kyaw Zin, Kyaw Kyaw Bo
2001–2010	Nay Kyat Chein	Wyne	Soe Myat Nandar, Soe Pyi Thazin
2001–2010	Nay Laung Pan	Mee Pwar	Eindra Kyaw Zin
2001–2010	Ngaye Mee	Okkar Bo	Zay Yar Aung, Wei Yan
2001–2010	No Theory for Love		Kyi Le Le Oo
2001–2010	Nya Khar Khar	Win Htun Htun	Soe Myat Thuzar
2001–2010	Nyi Akko Thu Nge Chin	Khin Mg Oo	Htun Htun, Pearl Win, Thazin
2001–2010	Nyout	Moe Aung	Nandar Hlaing
2001–2010	One Equals to Two		Myo Sandi Kyaw
2001–2010	Page 15	Wyne (Own Creator)	Min Thway, Soe Pyae Thazin
2001–2010	Pan Ka Lay Yel Zat Like		Moe Hay Ko
2001–2010	Pan Pwint Ko Hlat Kyee Mha Twe Ya Mel La Min		Eindra Kyaw Zin, Moe Hay Ko
2001–2010	Pan Ta Say	Myo Htoo	Thet Mon Myint
2001–2010	Pelt Kaing	Myo Htoo	Nawarat
2001–2010	Pelt Tin The Kan	Win Htun Htun	Yan Aung, Soe Myat Thuzar, Khaing Thin Kyi
2001–2010	Phway		Nawarat
2001–2010	Pin Lel Kauk Kyaung	Nay Paing	Soe Myat Thuzar, Wyne Su Khaing Thein
2001–2010	Pint Thet Hnit A Tu	Khin Hla	Nawarat
2001–2010	Pyaing Yel Yelt Lar	Win Htun Htun	May Than Nu, Nawarat
2001–2010	Pyaut Phyat Ma Ya Tae Su Chat	Okkar Bo	Khaing Hnin Wei
2001–2010	Pyork Thaw Lan Mhr San Ta War	Myint Soe	Tint Tint Htun, Cho Pyone, Myit Myit Khaing
2001–2010	Sal Kyaw Thet (Teenagers)		Eindra Kyaw Zin
2001–2010	San Ein Hla Hla, Thaw Ka Pway Pway	Htoo Thar	Nawarat
2001–2010	Sanay Maung Maung	Khin Saw Myo	Kyaw Thu, Min Maw Kun, Soe Myat Nandar
2001–2010	Sant Kyin Phat (Opposite)	Aung Kyaw Zaw	Myo Sandi Kyaw
2001–2010	Sat Htone	Okkar Bo	Nawarat
2001–2010	Sate Kan Mel Tat Myit	Zaw Sat	Eindra Kyaw Zin
2001–2010	Saung Shike Than	Nay Min Myat	Moe Pyi Pyi Maung
2001–2010	Seit Dart	Hein Zaw	May Kabya
2001–2010	Seit Ei Mar Yer	Htun Aung Zaw	Melody, Moe Yu San
2001–2010	Seit Ei Say Yar	Khin Maung Oo	Eindra Kyaw Zin
2001–2010	Seit Nyein Thaw Chit Chin Ei A Than	Mee Pwar	Eindra Kyaw Zin
2001–2010	Set Wine Htel Ka Sa Tu Gan	Aung Hein Lin	Su Hnin Htet
2001–2010	Sho What Lat Myar Phit Phan Sin Thaw		Nawarat, Khin Lay Nwe, Wyne Su Khaing Thein
2001–2010	Shwe Baung Kuak Tal Ngwe La Min	Win Htun Htun	Nandar Hlaing, Thet Mon Myint
2001–2010	Summer Door	Okkar Bo	Su Pan Htwar
2001–2010	Sue	Myo Htoo	Thet Mon Myint
2001–2010	Ta Kal Chit Khe Lar		Chit Thu Wei
2001–2010	Ta Ko Taw Yay Tat Ka Kha	Lwin Min	Eindra Kyaw Zin
2001–2010	Ta Thet Lone De A Taing	Mee Pwar	Nandar Hlaing
2001–2010	Ta War War Ta Har Har	Khin Saw Myo	Kyaw Thu, ZarGanar, Su Pan Htwar
2001–2010	Tain Kwel See Sar	Nay Paing	Soe Pyae Thazin
2001–2010	Tain Nyunt Sar Tat Thu		Htun Htun Win, Htun Aeindra Bo, May Than Nu
2001–2010	Tein Pyo Mi Thu	Moe Aung	Ye Aung, Nandar Hlaing
2001–2010	Tha Khin Chway Khwint	Ag Ba Power	Eindra Kyaw Zin
2001–2010	Than Tha Yar Hna Kway	Maung Ni Lwin	Myat Kaythi Aung, Pwint Nadi Maung
2001–2010	Thar Sit	Win Htun Htun	Zin Waing, Thet Mon Myint
2001–2010	Thar So Thaw Thar	Moe Aung	May Than Nu, Nawarat
2001–2010	Thar To Yote Yi	Kyaw Zaw Lin	Nay Aung, Cho Pyone, Chaw Yadana
2001–2010	Thay Lo Ya The	Ag Ba Power	Eindra Kyaw Zin
2001–2010	The Third Eye	Myo Htoo	Moe Hay Ko
2001–2010	Thu Hnit Thu Ako Myar	Lwin Min	Chit Thu Wei
2001–2010	Thu Kha Bone (Paradise)	Wyne (Own Creator)	Zeya, Moe Hay Ko, Moe Yu San
2001–2010	Thu Nge Chin Lat Htet Mingalar	Mee Pwar	Moe Hay Ko
2001–2010	Thwe Kyay Sat Yan Shi The	Htoo Thar	May Than Nu
2001–2010	Toe Tate Thaw	Zaw Sat	Pa Pa Win Khin
2001–2010	Twel Phat A Pyone	Ag Ba Power	Eindra Kyaw Zin
2001–2010	Villain Hero	Htoo Thar	Phone Lyan, Wyne Su Khaing Thein
2001–2010	Wi Ya Thitsar	Wie Mhaing Nyo	Nawarat
2001–2010	Wut Shi Tha Mya Kyay	Moe Aung	Su Shone Le, Su Hlaing Hnin
2001–2010	Yan Naing 24	Zaw Sat	Soe Myat Nandar, Pearl Win
2001–2010	Yaung Ma Yay Thu Nge Chin	Hein Soe	Soe Myat Thuzar, May Than Nu, Mo Mo Myint Aung
2001–2010	Yaung Pyan Dar		Nay Htet Lin, Nawarat
2001–2010	Yaw Yaw Shi		Lu Min, Pyay Ti Oo, Eindra Kyaw Zin
2001–2010	Yay San Hlaing	Ko Ko Lay	May ThanNu, Pan Phyu
2001–2010	Yay Thel York Kyar	Ag Ba Power	Eindra Kyaw Zin
2001–2010	Yet Kha Nyi Naung		Kyaw Thu
2001–2010	Yin Bat Htel Ka Dar	Denny	Wyne, Aye Wutyi Thaung
2001–2010	Yin Chin Sat Nway	Hein Soe	Eindra Kyaw Zin, Nay San
2001–2010	Yin Kwel Late Pyar	Myo Htoo	Nandar Hlaing
2001–2010	Yin Ngawe	Moe Aung	Nay San, Myo Sandi Kyaw
2001–2010	Yin Nint Khe Swel Taw Ywak	Okkar Bo	Myat Kaythi Aung
2011	Mg Ko Chit Thaw Main Ma Myar	Ko Zaw	Thet Mon Myint, Khin Lay Nwe
2011	A Chit A Thin Chay	Ag Ba Power	Soe Myat Nandar, Pearl Win
2011	Fate	Wyne	Thet Mon Myint, Phoo Phoo
2011	Chein Khwin	Ku Thou	Wut Hmone Shwe Yee
2011	La Yaung Nan Mha Pwint The Pan	Kyaw Zaw Lin	Chit Thu Wei
2011	A Chit Hnit A Nee A Nar Ta Wite Twin	Thein Han (Phoenix)	Wut Hmone Shwe Yee
2011	A Nay A Htaing Ma Tat Te Kye	Nyi Nyi Aung	Wut Hmone Shwe Yee
2011	Eden Tho	Wyne (Own Creator)	Moe Hay Ko
2011	A Chit Ne That Mhat Khe Tat Ba Wa Ei A Date Pe	Ko Zaw	Eindra Kyaw Zin
2011	A Phyu Yaung Maya	Htoo Thar	Ye Aung, Phway Phway
2011	Tomorrow Schedule	Sin Yaw Mg Mg	Moe Yu San
2011	Ngwe Ko Maung Htote Saung Lote Pay Par	Mg Daw Na	Soe Myat Thuzar
2011	Chit Pyan Tot Le A The A Than	Kyaw Zaw Lin	Moe Hay Ko
2011	A Chit Ei Phyar Yaung Thaw	Win Htun Htun	Thet Mon Myint
2011	Cho Chit Khar	Mee Pwar	Thet Mon Myint

== List of awards and nominations received by Nay Toe ==
Year	Award	Category	Nominated work	Result
2009	Myanmar Motion Picture Academy Awards	Best Actor	Moe Nya Einmet Myu	Won
2013	Myanmar Motion Picture Academy Awards	Best Actor	Satan's Dancer	Nominated
2013	Myanmar Motion Picture Academy Awards	Best Actor	Sone Pyue	Nominated
2015	Myanmar Motion Picture Academy Awards	Best Actor	Nat Khat Mhar Tae Tite Pwal	Won
2017	Myanmar Motion Picture Academy Awards	Best Actor	Tar Tay Gyi	Won
2018	Myanmar Motion Picture Academy Awards	Best Actor	Clinging with Hate	Nominated
2019	Myanmar Motion Picture Academy Awards	Best Actor	Chi	Nominated
2020	Myanmar Motion Picture Academy Awards	Best Actor	Myet Nu	Nominated
2024	Myanmar Motion Picture Academy Awards	Best Actor	Bound	Won
2025	Myanmar Motion Picture Academy Awards	Best Actor	Myit Let Tat Pay Mae Yay See Ka Kyan Tal	Nominated
2018	Star Awards	Best Actor in a Leading Role	Bridge of Clouds	Won
2019	Shwe FM Music Awards	Best Theme Song in Film (La Yaung Chout Tay)	("La Yaung Phyar Tae Inle Hmar")	Won
2020	Myanmar Pride Awards	Best Pride Actor		Won
