= Thet Mon Myint =

Burmese actress and model

- သက်မွန်မြင့်
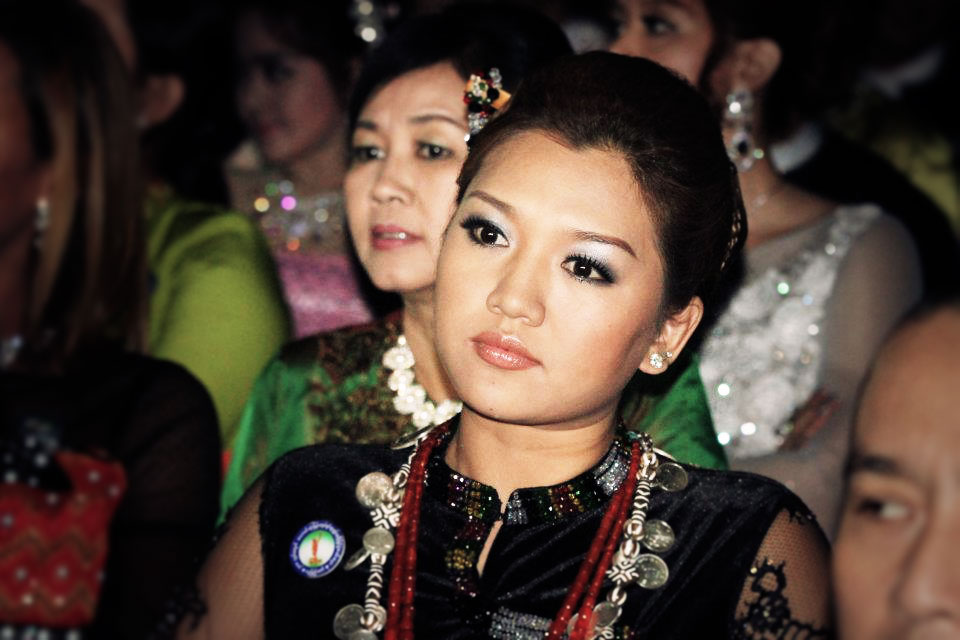
- Thet Mon Myint at 2010 Myanmar Academy Awards presentation ceremony
- Born: Zung Cer Mawi; 23 July 1982 (age 44); Falam, Chin State, Burma
- Other name: Chit Thet
- Education: Yangon Institute of Economics
- Occupations: Actress, Model
- Years active: 2000–present
- Height: 169 cm (5 ft 7 in)
- Spouse: Tsit Naing (m. 2014)
- Children: 2
- Awards: Myanmar Academy Award (Best actress for 2010); Myanmar Academy Award (Best actress for 2016)

Thet Mon Myint (Burmese: သက်မွန်မြင့်; born Zung Cer Mawi; on 23 July 1982) is a two-time Myanmar Academy Award winning actress and model. She is the Myanmar's fourth highest-paid actress. In 2019, she was listed on The Myanmar Times' "Top 10 Actor" list.

Thet Mon Myint is an ethnic Chin from Chin State in western Myanmar.

== Early life ==
Thet Mon Myint was born on 23 July 1982 in Falam by Myint U and Daw Myaing, of Chin descent. She went to B.E.H.S(1) Falam, Chin State and graduated from Yangon Institute of Economics.

== Career ==
Starting from early 2000s, she began her career as a model in music videos of famous singers in Myanmar. In 2003, 2004, and 2005, she became a household name for her cute and innocent acting in TV commercials. She was replaced as the Queen of TVC after the famous actress, Htet Htet Moe Oo.

She rose into fame in 2009. From 2010 onwards, she established herself as a leading actresses in Myanmar, and later, as one of the most popular actresses of Burmese cinema.

At the time of her acting debut, Thet Mon Myint faced many difficulty in communicating with cast members because of her Chin accent when she speaks Burmese. But she has now overcome this problem.

She has received two Myanmar Academy Awards for Best Actress for her role in the films Adam, Eve and Datsa for 2012 and My Lovely Hate for 2016.

== Political activities ==
Following the 2021 Myanmar coup d'état, Thet Mon Myint was active in the anti-coup movement both in person at rallies and through social media. Denouncing the military coup, she has taken part in protests since February. He joined the "We Want Justice" three-finger salute movement. The movement was launched on social media, and many celebrities have joined the movement.

On 3 April 2021, warrants for her arrest were issued under section 505 (a) of the penal code by the State Administration Council for speaking out against the military coup. Along with several other celebrities, she was charged with calling for participation in the Civil Disobedience Movement (CDM) and damaging the state's ability to govern, with supporting the Committee Representing Pyidaungsu Hluttaw, and with generally inciting the people to disturb the peace and stability of the nation.

== Personal life ==
Thet Mon Myint married to Tsit Naing in 2014. On 12 April 2015, she gave birth to a son, Arr Chit and to a daughter, La Won May (San Mawi) on 13 December 2016.

== Filmography ==
Key
‡	Denotes films that have not yet been released

=== Film ===
Year	Title	Director	Co-stars	Notes
2006	Gon Shein Pyin Tae Chit Chin Thake Khar	Daww Na	Yan Aung; Sai Sai Kham Hlaing; Htun Eaindra Bo	
2006	Lwan Aung Ye Tat Thu	Maung Wunna	Kyaw Ye Aung; Pyay Zin; Ko Yu Pa; May Thinzar Oo	
2007	A May Nè Tha Mee Myar	Anthony (Mawlamyine)	Yan Aung; Ye Aung; Soe Myat Thuzar; Khine Thin Kyi; Sandi Myint Lwin; Zar Zar Min Htet	
2008	A Chit Ka Lan Dal	Nyi Nyi Tun Lwin	Min Maw Kun; Khant Si Thu; Htun Htun; Moe Aung Yin; Soe Myat Thuzar; Melody; Soe Pyae Thazin	
2008	Hot Shot	Nyi Nyi Tun Lwin	Yan Aung; Thu Htoo San; Moe Aung Yin; Moh Moh Myint Aung; May Than Nu; Thinzar Wint Kyaw	
2008	Yin Khon Hnin Si	Aung Swe Myanmar	Kyaw Thu; Sai Sai Kham Hlaing; Moh Moh Myint Aung; Myat Kaythi Aung	
2009	Nat Phat Tae Sone Twal Myar	Ko Zaw (Ar Yone Oo)	Pyay Ti Oo; Nan Da; Ye Aung; Soe Myat Thuzar; Eindra Kyaw Zin	
2010	Lar Htar Ar Bwarr	Ko Zaw (Ar Yon Oo)	Nay Toe; Wai Lu Kyaw; Nan Da; Yan Aung; Aung Lwin; Christina	
2010	A May Kyay Zu Satt Phu Chin Tal	Khin Saw Myo	Pyay Ti Oo; Nay Aung; Min Thu; May Than Nu; Hla Inzali Tint; Wah Wah Aung	Nominated-Best Actress Award
2010	Burmeton	Khin Maung Oo & Soe Thein Htut	Nay Toe; Yan Aung; Htun Eaindra Bo	
2010	Kyauk Thin Pone Tway Moe Htar Tae Eain	Ko Zaw (Ar Yon Oo)	Kyaw Ye Aung; Pyay Ti Oo; Htoo Khant Kyaw; Soe Myat Thuzar; Chaw Yadanar	
2010	Adam, Eve and Datsa	Wyne (Own Creator)	Pyay Ti Oo; Sai Sai Kham Hlaing; Ye Aung; Myo Thandar Htun; Soe Moe Kyi	Won-Best Actress Award
2010	Hot Shot (3)	Nyi Nyi Tun Lwin	Yan Aung; Ye Aung; Lwin Moe; Thu Htoo San; Moe Aung Yin; Moh Moh Myint Aung; May Than Nu; Maykhala; L Sai Zi	
2011	Lar Htar Ar Bwarr (2)	Ko Zaw (Ar Yon Oo)	Nay Toe, Wai Lu Kyaw, Nay San, Soe Myat Nandar, Sa Bae Moe	
2011	The Moon Lotus	Sin Yaw Mg Mg	Nine Nine, Phyo Ngwe Soe, Si Thu Maung, Ye Aung, Min Htet Kyaw Zin	Nominated-Best Actress Award
2011	Atonement	Khin Maung Oo & Soe Thein Htut	Khant Si Thu, Kyaw Zaw Hein, Htun Eaindra Bo, Khine Hnine Wai	Nominated-Best Actress Award
2011	Ah Mhway Za Yarr	Nyi Nyi Tun Lwin	Yan Aung, Thu Htoo San, Moe Aung Yin, Nay Htet Lin, Moh Moh Myint Aung	
2012	Chit Dal Pyaw Ma Lut Mal	Ko Zaw (Ar Yon Oo)	Nay Toe, Wai Lu Kyaw, Yan Aung, Moh Moh Myint Aung, May Thinzar Oo	
2012	I LOVE YOU	Nyi Nyi Tun Lwin	Yan Aung, Thu Htoo San, Moe Aung Yin, Moh Moh Myint Aung, Melody	
2012	Aung Padin Inn Padaung	Win Tun Tun	Nay Toe, Bay Lu Wa, Kin Kaung	
2013	Star Record	Pa Gyi Soe Moe	Lu Min, Nay Toe, Wai Lu Kyaw, Htun Htun, Ye Aung	
2013	12 Nar Ye Tha Toh Thar	Nyi Nyi Tun Lwin	Nay Toe, Kyaw Kyaw Bo, Chaw Yadanar, Tha Zin, Sandi Myint Lwin	
2013	Satan's Dancer	Wyne (Own Creator)	Nay Toe, Si Thu Mg, Zin Wine, Hè Bi Phyo, Yoon Yoon	Nominated-Best Actress Award
2014	Mar Yar Project	Wyne (Own Creator)	Nay Toe, Kyaw Kyaw, Phway Phway	Nominated-Best Actress Award
2014	Ko Tint Toh Super Yat Kwat	Kyaw Zaw Linn	Ah Yine, Yan Aung, Ye Aung, Lu Min, Min Maw Kun	Special appearance
2014	Black Sheep	Win Tun Tun	Nay Toe, Min Yar Zar, Moe Yan Zun, Khine Thin Kyi, Thinzar Wint Kyaw	
2015	Nat Khat Mhar Tae Tite Pwal	Nyunt Myanmar Nyi Nyi Aung	Nay Toe; Zaw Oo; Yadanar Phyu Phyu Aung; May Thinzar Oo	Nominated-Best Actress Award
2015	Aung Bar Lay	Kyaw Zaw Linn	Nay Toe; Ye Aung; Tun Tun Win; Khin Hlaing; May Than Nu; May Thinzar Oo; Yoon Shwe Ye	
2016	My Lovely Hate	Wyne	Aung Ye Lin; Zin Wine; Wut Hmone Shwe Yee; Nwè Nwè San	Won-Best Actress Award
2016	Luu Yadanar Treasure	Ko Zaw (Ar Yon Oo)	Kyaw Ye Aung; Nay Min; Thar Nyi; Kaung Pyae; Soe Myat Thuzar; Phu Phu; Saung Eaindri Tun	
2016	Oak Kyar Myet Pauk	Nyunt Myanmar Nyi Nyi Aung	Nay Toe; Htun Htun; Nay Min; Zin Wine; Kyat Pha; Soe Myat Thuzar; Soe Moe Kyi; Sandi Myint Lwin	
2016	Pyan Khaw Thet Thay	Mee Pwar	Hein Wai Yan; Thar Nyi; Suu Sha; Kyaw Kyaw	
2017	Saii Kyait Dae Maung	Ko Pauk	Khant Si Thu; Myint Myat; Kyaw Kyaw; Wai Lyan; Khin Hlaing	
2018	Deception	Christina Kyi	Zenn Kyi; Aung Myint Myat; Min Oo; Kyaw Ko Ko Wai; Kaew Korravee; Chuu Sitt Han	
2018	Mway Chet Ka Dot Lon Loon Tal	Kyaw Zaw Linn	Nay Toe; Aung Lwin; Ah Yine; Yoon Shwe Ye	
2018	Ah Way Chit	Ko Zaw (Ar Yon Oo)	Aung Ye Lin; Htun Ko Ko; Soe Myat Thuzar; Thandar Bo	
2018	Let Sar Chay Nat Ta Me	Nyo Min Lwin	Phyo Ngwe Soe; Aww Bar; Nan Su Oo	
2018	Killing Field	Thar Nyi	Min Thway; Si Phyo; Nay Ye; Htoo Char; Nay Toe; Zin Wine; Paing Phyo Thu	guest appearance
2019	Tar Too	Kyaw Zaw Linn	Lwin Moe; Nay Toe; Yoon Shwe Ye	
2019	Mingalar Oo Nya	Ko Zaw (Ar Yon Oo)	Kyaw Ye Aung; Aung Ye Lin; Ye Aung; Aye Myat Thu	
2019	Hmarr Dae Bet Ka Nay Kyih Bar	Maung Maung Oo (Snow White)	Aung Ye Lin; Ye Aung; Min Oo; Wint Yamone Hlaing; May Than Nu	
2019	Bar Lar Lar	Ko Zaw (Ar Yon Oo)	Myint Myat; Kyaw Kyaw Bo; Ye Lay; Honey	
2019	The Elite and the Fish Paste	Steel (Dwe Myit Tar)	Htun Ko Ko; Zin Wine; Htoo Char; Nay Ye; Min Kha; Thein Lin Soe; Shwe Thamee	
2019	Bo Nay Toe	Steel (Dwe Myit Tar)	Nay Toe; Zin Wine; Min Oo; Nay Myo Aung; Htun Ko Ko; Htoo Char; Nay Ye; Min Kha; Paing Phyo Thu; Nang Khin Zay Yar	
2019	Chi	Nyunt Myanmar Nyi Nyi Aung	Nay Toe; Hein Min; Shwe Thamee	Nominated-Best Actress Award
2020	Ta Thet Sar ‡	Steel (Dwe Myit Tar)	Min Maw Kun; Si Phyo; Ye Aung; Nay Htet Lin	Post-production
2020	A Pyinn Sarr A Chit ‡	Zabu Htun Thet Lwin	Lu Min; Nay Dwe; Nay Naw; Nang Shwe Ye; May Than Nu; Myint Myint Khin	Post-production
2020	Sa Kyat ‡	Hpone Thaik	Nine Nine; Min Oo; Hpone Thaik; Chaw Kalayar	Post-production
2020	Love Equation ‡	Aung Myat	Daung; Khar Ra; Phway Phway; May Thinzar Oo	Post-production
2020	Da Lan ‡	Steel (Dwe Myit Tar)	Htun Htun; Htun Ko Ko; Htoo Char; Soe Myat Thuzar; Aye Myat Thu; Shwe Thamee	Post-production
2020	A Shan Per ‡	Steel (Dwe Myit Tar)	Htun Htun; A Linn Yaung; Khin Hlaing; Khine Thin Kyi; Aye Myat Thu; Shwe Thamee; May Myint Mo	Post-production
2020	Shwe Oo Ngwe Oo Pyae Lyan Phyo ‡	Kyaw Zaw Linn	Lu Min; Nay Dwe; Nay Naw; Kyaw Htet Zaw; Khine Thin Kyi; Moe Pyae Pyae Maung; Yin Lat	Post-production
2020	Nat Nay Taung ‡	Pyi Hein Thi Ha	Lu Min; Htun Htun; Ye Lay; Paing Phyo Thu	Post-production
2020	Ka Wai Ti Lot Chauk Dè Ta Si ‡	Ko Zaw (Ar Yon Oo)	Myint Myat; Chue Lay; Sa Bae Moe	Post-production
2020	Thar Yar Dal Kyi Nat Dal ‡	Kyaw Zaw Linn	Zay Ye Htet; Yan Aung; Nang Khin Zay Yar	Post-production
2020	Mya Kay Khaing Min Ye Lae ‡	Aww Ya Tha	Kyaw Ye Aung; A Linn Yaung; Htoo Aung; Kyaw Kyaw; Myo Thandar Htun; Han Lay; Soe Moe Kyi; Su Myat Noe Oo	Pre-production
2023	Vein of Love	Thar Nyi	Nine Nine; Shwe Htoo; Zin Wine; Nay Myo Aung; Pyay Zin; May Myint Mo; May Thinzar Oo	Also known as Fourth Capillary

=== Television series ===
Year	Title	Director	Co-stars	Notes
2020	Ya Khae Tha Mya Ah Yar Yar ‡	Ko Zaw (Ar Yon Oo)	Tun Ko Ko; Kaung Pyae; Aye Chan Maung; Hsu Pan Htwar; Pwint Nadi Maung	Post-production
2020	Wingabar Lann Ma Myar (Twisted Roads) ‡	Htut Tint Tun	Sai Sai Kham Leng; Phyo Ngwe Soe; Aye Myat Thu; Khin Wint Wah; A Nyein Phyu; Li Li Kyaw Khaing	Post-production

== Awards and nominations ==
=== Myanmar Academy Awards ===
Year	Nominated work	Category	Result
2010	Adam, Eve and Datsa	Best Actress	Won
2010	A May Kyay Zuu Sat Phu Chin Dal	Best Actress	Nominated
2011	Pann Kyar Wutt Hmone	Best Actress	Nominated
2011	Wut Kyway (Atonement)	Best Actress	Nominated
2013	Satan Yè Ka Chay Te (Dancer of Satan)	Best Actress	Nominated
2014	Mar Yar Project (Artifice Project)	Best Actress	Nominated
2015	Nat Khat Mhar Tae Tite Pwal (Wrong Stars Battle)	Best Actress	Nominated
2016	My Lovely Hate	Best Actress	Won
2019	Chi	Best Actress	Nominated
2023	Vein of Love	Best Actress	Nominated

=== Focus Online Audience Choice Awards ===
Year	Award	Category	Result
2012	Focus Online Audience Choice Award	Artist	Won
2013	Focus Online Audience Choice Award	Female Artist	Top 5
2014	Focus Online Audience Choice Award	Female Artist	Won
