= Responsible Citizen =

2019 Burmese film

- film poster
- Burmese: နိုင်ငံကြီးသား
- Directed by: Steel (Dwe Myittar)
- Screenplay by: Maung Myat Swe
- Story by: Zan Thakhin Thway; Steel (Dwe Myittar)
- Produced by: Naing Swe; Aye Maw Lay
- Starring: Nay Toe; Min Maw Kun; Htun Htun; Nay Htet Lin; Nay Myo Aung; Zin Wine; Min Thway; Si Phyo; Moe Yan Zun; Htun Ko Ko; Shwe Thamee; Awn Seng
- Cinematography: Mano V. Narayanan
- Production company: Arr Man Film Production
- Release date: August 8, 2019
- Running time: 120 minutes
- Country: Myanmar
- Language: Burmese

Responsible Citizen (Burmese: နိုင်ငံကြီးသား) is a 2019 Burmese political action film, directed by Steel (Dwe Myittar) starring Nay Toe, Min Maw Kun, Htun Htun, Nay Htet Lin, Nay Myo Aung, Zin Wine, Min Thway, Si Phyo, Moe Yan Zun, Htun Ko Ko, Shwe Thamee and Awn Seng. The film, produced by Arr Man Production premiered Myanmar on August 8, 2019.

== Plot ==
A police officer daring to confront and launched investigation the corrupt politicians and their sons who committed rape of model that cause their downfall from power.

== Filming ==
Principal photography began in June 2018.

== Cast ==
- Nay Toe as Deputy Police Commissioner Ye Thiha
- Min Maw Kun as Kaung Tayza
- Htun Htun as Police Officer Thura Zaw
- Nay Htet Lin as U Min Maung
- Nay Myo Aung as U Htut Tin
- Zin Wine as U Kaung Myat
- Min Thway as Nay Min Thurain
- Nay Ye as Htut Myat Min
- Shwe Thamee as Chit Su
- Awn Seng as Saw Yu Nwe
- Si Phyo
- Moe Yan Zun
- Htun Ko Ko
- Htoo Char
- Thein Lin Soe
- Sara Saung Oo
- Maung Thi
