= Myaw Lint Chin Myar Swar =

2006 Burmese Film

- Film Poster
- Burmese: မျှော်လင့်ခြင်းများစွာ
- Directed by: Maung Myo Min
- Screenplay by: Nyein Min
- Story by: Maung Myo Min
- Starring: Htun Htun Win; Zin Wine; Yan Aung; Ye Aung; Dwe; Min Maw Kun; Nine Nine; Phoe Kyaw; Min Kha; Pyay Ti Oo; Hat Kat; May Thinzar Oo; Soe Moe Kyi; Pan Phyu; Soe Myat Nandar; Nawarat; Paing Phyo Thu
- Edited by: Zaw Min (Hanthar Myay)
- Production company: Nawarat Film Production
- Release date: 2006
- Running time: 147 minutes
- Country: Myanmar
- Language: Burmese

Myaw Lint Chin Myar Swar (Burmese: မျှော်လင့်ခြင်းများစွာ) is a 2006 Burmese drama film, directed by Maung Myo Min starring Htun Htun Win, Zin Wine, Yan Aung, Ye Aung, Dwe, Min Maw Kun, Nine Nine, Phoe Kyaw, Min Kha, Pyay Ti Oo, Hat Kat, May Thinzar Oo, Soe Moe Kyi, Pan Phyu, Soe Myat Nandar, Nawarat and Paing Phyo Thu. It is an awareness film about the disease HIV/AIDS.

== Cast ==
- Htun Htun Win as Father of Pwint Khet Wai
- Zin Wine as U Tin Swe Nyein
- Yan Aung as Dr. U Myint Mo
- Ye Aung as U Aung Naing
- Dwe as the painter
- Min Maw Kun as Khit Min Nyo
- Nine Nine as Sit Naing
- Phoe Kyaw as Ye Myint Mo
- Min Kha as Htoo Aung
- Pyay Ti Oo as Pyay Ti Oo
- Hat Kat as Dr. Kaung Zaw
- May Thinzar Oo as Daw Yin Nyo
- Soe Moe Kyi as Mother of Sit Naing
- Pan Phyu as Pwint Khet Wai
- Soe Myat Nandar as Phyu Myint Mo
- Nawarat as partner of the painter
- Paing Phyo Thu as Phoo Ngone

== Awards ==
Year	Award	Category	Nominee	Result
2006	Myanmar Motion Picture Academy Awards	Best Picture	Nawarat Film Production	Won
2006	Myanmar Motion Picture Academy Awards	Best Director	Maung Myo Min	Won
2006	Myanmar Motion Picture Academy Awards	Best Supporting Actor	Phoe Kyaw	Won
2006	Myanmar Motion Picture Academy Awards	Best Editor	Zaw Min (Hanthar Myay)	Won
