= Ko Tint Toh Super Yat Kwat =

2014 Burmese film

- film poster
- Burmese: ကိုတင့်တို့စူပါရပ်ကွက်
- Directed by: Kyaw Zaw Lin
- Screenplay by: Ko Kyaw
- Story by: Wai Thar (Ko Shwe Htoo (Pyay) comic)
- Starring: A Yine; Moe Pyae Pyae Maung; Yan Aung; Ye Aung; Lu Min; Min Maw Kun; Nay Toe; Pyay Ti Oo; Myint Myat; Phyo Ngwe Soe; Aung Ye Lin; Nyi Nanda; Phoe Chit; Kyaw Kyaw; Kaung Pyae; Soe Myat Thuzar; Eaindra Kyaw Zin; Sandi Myint Lwin; Thet Mon Myint; Wutt Hmone Shwe Yi; Phway Phway; Yoon Shwe Yi; Khin Hlaing; Dain Daung; Wah Wah Aung; Goon Pone; Aye Aye Khine
- Cinematography: Htun Htun Win; Ye Mon
- Edited by: Lin Lin
- Music by: Thein Lwin (Danamoe)
- Production company: Sein Htay Film Production
- Release date: December 5, 2014
- Running time: 120 minutes
- Country: Myanmar
- Language: Burmese

Ko Tint Toh Super Yat Kwat (Burmese: ကိုတင့်တို့စူပါရပ်ကွက်) is a 2014 Burmese comedy film, directed by Kyaw Zaw Lin. The film, produced by Sein Htay Film Production premiered in Myanmar on December 5, 2014.

== Cast ==
- A Yine as Ko Tint
- Moe Pyae Pyae Maung as Mi Cho
- Myint Myat as Kaung Myat
- Sandi Myint Lwin as Dee Dee
- Phyo Ngwe Soe as Aung Min Naing
- Yan Aung as Mal Kin
- Lu Min as Baydin Sayar
- Aung Ye Lin as Aung San Toe
- Phway Phway as Khin Chaw
- Soe Myat Thuzar as Daw Thuzar
- Khin Hlaing as Pu Lone
- Aye Aye Khine as Ma Yin Aye
- Nay Toe as Toe Gyi
- Thet Mon Myint as Ma Mhway
- Dain Daung as Maung Khain
- Gone Pone as Ei Mon
- Nyi Nanda as Htun Htun
- Yoon Shwe Yi as San San
- Pyay Ti Oo as Thu Ta
- Wutt Hmone Shwe Yi as Wutt Hmone
- Min Maw Kun as Nay Min Thar
- Eaindra Kyaw Zin as La Min May
