= Bo Nay Toe =

2019 Burmese action film

- Film Poster
- Burmese: ဗိုလ်နေတိုး
- Directed by: Steel (Dwe Myittar)
- Screenplay by: Maung Myat Swe
- Story by: Steel (Dwe Myittar)
- Starring: Nay Toe; Htun Ko Ko; Min Oo; Nay Myo Aung; Zin Wine; Htoo Char; Nay Ye; Thet Mon Myint; Paing Phyo Thu; Nang Khin Zay Yar
- Production company: Lu Swan Kaung Film Production
- Release date: November 21, 2019 (Myanmar)
- Running time: 120 minutes
- Country: Myanmar
- Language: Burmese

Bo Nay Toe (Burmese: ဗိုလ်နေတိုး) is a 2019 Burmese action-drama film, directed by Steel (Dwe Myittar) starring Nay Toe, Htun Ko Ko, Min Oo, Nay Myo Aung, Zin Wine, Htoo Char, Nay Ye, Thet Mon Myint, Paing Phyo Thu and Nang Khin Zay Yar.The film, produced by Thinkayta Film Production premiered in Myanmar on November 21, 2019.

== Cast ==
- Nay Toe as Bo Nay Toe
- Htun Ko Ko as Ba Khet
- Min Oo as Saw Ba Htun
- Nay Myo Aung as Kyaw Khaung
- Zin Wine
- Htoo Char as Yetkha
- Nay Ye as Rachet
- Thet Mon Myint as Nan Kyar Nyo
- Paing Phyo Thu as Rita
- Nang Khin Zay Yar as Phyu Ma
