= Adam, Eve and Datsa =

- Theatrical poster
- Burmese: အာဒမ်ရယ်၊ ဧဝရယ်၊ ဒသရယ်
- Directed by: Wyne
- Based on: novel by Ponnya Khin
- Produced by: Heart & Soul Video Production
- Starring: Pyay Ti Oo; Thet Mon Myint; Sai Sai Kham Leng
- Release dates: December 2010 (countrysides, Myanmar); 1 July 2011 (Yangon, Myanmar)
- Running time: 105 minutes
- Country: Myanmar
- Language: Burmese

Adam, Eve and Datsa or Ar-Dan-Yal-Aye-Wa-Yal-Da-Tha-Yal (Burmese: အာဒမ်ရယ်၊ ဧဝရယ်၊ ဒဿရယ်) is a 2010 Burmese drama film produced by Heart & Soul Film Production. It was based on Ponnya Khin's novel Achit or Winkabar. It was directed by Wyne (Own Creator). Pyay Ti Oo, Sai Sai Kham Leng and Thet Mon Myint starred as the main characters. This film showed in Singapore on 4 September 2011 and Los Angeles in United States on 19 and 20 November 2011.

== Plot ==
The film was shot in Yangon. It's a love triangle story between three people. Min Htin Si (Datsa) is the boyfriend of Ngwe La Thar (Eve). Moe Thout (Adam) also loves Ngwe La too. There was a problem between Moe Thout and Min Htin Si. Min Htin Si's father died because of Moe Thout's father. Moe Thout's father had love stories with Min Htin Si's mother. Therefore, Min Htin Si's father and mother had conflicts because of that. So, Min Htin Si hated Moe Thout's family since he was a child. Moe Thout did everything Ngwe La want while Min Htin Si was using Ngwe La to revenge Moe Thout since he knows Moe Thout loves Ngwe La. However, Ngwe La never thought that her boyfriend, Min Htin Si, is using her. But when she know that her boyfriend is using her, she tried to hate Min Htin Si.

== Cast ==
- Pyay Ti Oo as Min Htin Si (Datsa)
- Thet Mon Myint as Ngwe La Thar (Eve)
- Sai Sai Kham Hlaing as Moe Thout (Adam)
- Ye Aung
- Htun Htun Win
- Myo Thandar Htun
- Soe Moe Kyi

== Awards ==
On 7 February 2012, the film had won 3 awards in the Academy Award Ceremony held in Nay Pyi Taw, Myanmar. Pyay Ti Oo won the best lead actor award, Thet Mon Myint won the best lead actress award and the movie itself won the best movie award of 2010.
