= Killing Field (film) =

2018 Burmese film

- Film Poster
- Burmese: သတ်ကွင်း
- Directed by: Thar Nyi
- Screenplay by: Sue Khat Min
- Story by: Thar Nyi; Sue Khat Min; Moe Sat Wine
- Starring: Min Thway; Si Phyo; Nay Ye; Htoo Char
- Production company: Myaing Tha Ra Phu Film Production
- Release date: December 14, 2018
- Running time: 120 minutes
- Country: Myanmar
- Language: Burmese

Killing Field (Burmese: သတ်ကွင်း) is a 2018 Burmese action-thriller film, directed by Thar Nyi starring Min Thway, Si Phyo, Nay Ye and Htoo Char. The film, produced by Myaing Tha Ra Phu Film Production premiered in Myanmar on December 14, 2018.

== Cast ==
=== Main cast ===
- Min Thway as Sam
- Si Phyo as Si Thu
- Nay Ye as Paing Soe
- Htoo Char as Na Gar

=== Guest cast ===
- Paing Phyo Thu as Kham
- Nay Toe
- Thet Mon Myint
- Zin Wine
