= 39 Bite Pu =

2014 Burmese Film

- Film Poster
- Burmese: ၃၉ဗိုက်ပူ
- Directed by: Nyunt Myanmar Nyi Nyi Aung
- Screenplay by: Nay Soe Thaw
- Story by: Nay Yee Min
- Produced by: Min Mya Aye
- Starring: Nay Toe; Wai Lu Kyaw; Wutt Hmone Shwe Yi; Chaw Yadanar; Soe Myat Thuzar
- Cinematography: Kyauk Phyu
- Edited by: Tay Zar Aung; Aung Ko; Oakkar
- Music by: Thein Lwin
- Production company: Country Star Films
- Release date: January 31, 2014
- Running time: 116 minutes
- Country: Myanmar
- Language: Burmese

39 Bite Pu (Burmese: ၃၉ဗိုက်ပူ) is a 2014 Burmese comedy film, directed by Nyunt Myanmar Nyi Nyi Aung starring Nay Toe, Wai Lu Kyaw, Wutt Hmone Shwe Yi, Chaw Yadanar and Soe Myat Thuzar.

== Cast ==
- Nay Toe as Lu Chaw
- Wai Lu Kyaw as Sein Paw
- Wutt Hmone Shwe Yi as Sunny
- Chaw Yadanar as Zu Zu
- Soe Myat Thuzar as Daw Sein Net
- Ye Aung as Father of Sunny
- Moe Di as U Di Lone
- Bay Lu Wa as Punk Bay
- May Thinzar Oo as Daw Thinzar
