= Thar Pike Kaung =

2018 Burmese film

- Film Poster
- Burmese: သားပိုက်ကောင်
- Directed by: Steel (Dwe Myittar)
- Screenplay by: Nay Soe Thae
- Story by: Zan Thazin Thway
- Starring: Htun Htun; Soe Myat Thuzar; Shwe Thamee
- Cinematography: Mano V. Narayanan
- Production company: Arr Mhan Film Production
- Release date: June 8, 2018
- Running time: 120 minutes
- Country: Myanmar
- Language: Burmese

Thar Pike Kaung (Burmese: သားပိုက်ကောင်) is a 2018 Burmese comedy-drama film, directed by Steel (Dwe Myittar) starring Htun Htun, Soe Myat Thuzar and Shwe Thamee. The film, produced by Arr Mhan Film Production premiered Myanmar on 8 June 2018.

== Cast ==
- Htun Htun as Phoe Shwe La Min
- Shwe Thamee as May Yin Kyay
- Soe Myat Thuzar as Daw Yin Nit
- Dain Daung as Aung Mat
- May Kabyar Oo as May Barani
- Min Oo as Father of May Yin Kyay
