= City Hunters (film) =

2019 Burmese action film

- Film Poster
- Burmese: မြို့ပြမုဆိုးများ
- Directed by: Nyan Htin
- Screenplay by: Nyan Htin
- Produced by: Nora Ko
- Starring: Khar Ra; Yan Aung; Zin Wine; Pyae Wade Maung; Min Myat Soe San; Khant Nyar; Ja Seng Ing; Hein Thit Sa; Han Nway
- Cinematography: Kar Yan
- Edited by: Nyan Htin
- Production company: Bonanza Film Production
- Release date: March 1, 2019 (Myanmar)
- Running time: 120 minutes
- Country: Myanmar
- Language: Burmese

City Hunters (Burmese: မြို့ပြမုဆိုးများ) is a 2019 Burmese action film, directed by Nyan Htin starring Khar Ra, Yan Aung, Zin Wine, Pyae Wade Maung, Min Myat Soe San, Khant Nyar, Ja Seng Ing, Hein Thit Sa and Han Nway. The film, produced by Bonanza Film Production premiered in Myanmar on March 1, 2019.

== Cast ==
- Khar Ra as Sai Lon
- Pyae Wade Maung as Mabel Latt
- Yan Aung as U Thite Htun
- Zin Wine as U Naung Ye Latt
- Min Myat Soe San as Nay Myo
- Khant Nyar as Sai Naung
- Ja Seng Ing as Jenny Wong
- Hein Thit Sa as Daniel Latt
- Han Nway as Darli
