= My Lovely Hate =

2016 film directed by Wyne

- Film poster
- Burmese: ချစ်လှစွာသောအမုန်း
- Directed by: Wyne
- Screenplay by: Wyne
- Based on: My Lovely Hate by Ponnya Khin
- Produced by: Khayan Pyar
- Starring: Aung Ye Lin; Thet Mon Myint; Wutt Hmone Shwe Yi; Zin Wine; Nwet Nwet San
- Cinematography: Moe Kyaw
- Edited by: Kyaw Khaing Soe
- Music by: Diramore
- Production company: Khayay Phyu Film Production
- Release date: January 1, 2016
- Running time: 142 minutes
- Country: Myanmar
- Language: Burmese language

My Lovely Hate (Burmese: ချစ်လှစွာသောအမုန်း) is a 2016 Burmese drama film starring, Aung Ye Lin, Thet Mon Myint and Wutt Hmone Shwe Yi. The film, produced by Kayay Phyu Production and premiered in Myanmar on January 1, 2016.

At the 2016 Myanmar Academy Awards Presentation Ceremony, the film received three nominations including two best actress awards for Thet Mon Myint and Wutt Hmone Shwe Yi, and best supporting actor award for Zin Wine. Thet Mon Myint won her second Myanmar Academy Awards for best actress category.

== Plot ==
Moe Sat May's mother has died. One day, Moe Sat May's father remarries to a woman whom he doesn’t love. The girl's name is Ah Mone (translation in English is “hate”) and she is younger than Moe Sat May. Moe Sat May can't protest her father’s decision because she is scared of him. At first, she is angry towards Ah Mone. Eventually, Moe Sat May comes to understand and feel pity for Ah Mone.

She and her friend Garmani help Ah Mone. Moe Sat May loves her friend Garmani, but she is too shy to confess her feelings. One day, Moe Sat May's father becomes crippled and Ah Mone takes good care of her husband. At the end of the film, Garmani and Moe Sat May get married, and Moe Sat May's father and Ah Mone became the grandpa and grandma of Garmani and Moe Sat May's children.

== Cast ==
- Aung Ye Lin as Garmani
- Thet Mon Myint as Moe Sat May
- Wutt Hmone Shwe Yi as A Mone
- Zin Wine as U Toe Min, Father of Moe Sat May
- Nwet Nwet San as Aunty May

== Awards and nominations ==
On 18 March 2017, the film received three nominations winning one for best lead actress award at the Academy Award Presentation Ceremony for 2016 held in Yangon, Myanmar.

| Year | Award | Artist | Category | Result |
|---|---|---|---|---|
| 2016 | Myanmar Academy Award | Thet Mon Myint | Best Actress | Won |
| 2016 | Myanmar Academy Award | Wut Hmone Shwe Yee | Best Actress | Nominated |
| 2016 | Myanmar Academy Award | Zin Wine | Best Supporting Actor | Nominated |
