= Chi (2019 film) =

2019 Burmese film

- Burmese: ချည်
- Directed by: Nyunt Myanmar Nyi Nyi Aung
- Screenplay by: Htet Myat Naing Zin
- Story by: Min Khite Soe San
- Starring: Nay Toe; Thet Mon Myint; Shwe Thamee
- Production company: Aung Tine Kyaw Film Production
- Release date: December 26, 2019 (Myanmar)
- Running time: 113 minutes
- Country: Myanmar
- Language: Burmese

Chi (Burmese: ချည်) is a 2019 Burmese drama film, directed by Nyunt Myanmar Nyi Nyi Aung starring Nay Toe, Thet Mon Myint and Shwe Thamee. The film, produced by Aung Tine Kyaw Film Production premiered in Myanmar on December 26, 2019.

== Synopsis ==
The movie depicts an emotional voyage where the bonds of love and loyalty in marriage fray, illustrating the intricate difficulties of devotion and faithfulness that emerge when an outsider intrudes on a straightforward married existence. Entitled 'Chi' (Thread) symbolizing the marital connection，the story vividly depicts the complex relationships, personal struggles, sacrifices, and the deep nature of love among the three central characters: Khun Tha, Mu Yar, and Ngo

== Cast ==
- Nay Toe as Khoon Da
- Thet Mon Myint as Mu Yar
- Shwe Thamee as Ngu
