= Padauk Musical =

Burmese Film

- Film poster
- Burmese: ပိတောက်ကတဲ့ဂီတ
- Directed by: Mee Pwar
- Screenplay by: Nay Naw; Ingyin Han
- Produced by: Sai Sai Kham Leng
- Starring: Sai Sai Kham Leng; Poe Mamhe Thar; Aye Myat Thu; Kyaw Thu; Zin Wine; Cho Pyone; Soe Myat Thuzar; May Thinzar Oo
- Edited by: Myo Kyaw Oo
- Music by: Sai Sai Kham Leng; Diramore; Moe Moe; Mg Mg Pyae Sone
- Production company: Frenzo Production
- Distributed by: Frenzo Production
- Release date: March 5, 2020
- Running time: 127 minutes
- Country: Myanmar
- Language: Burmese

Padauk Musical, also known as Padauk Ka Tae Gita (Burmese: ပိတောက်ကတဲ့ဂီတ), is a 2020 Burmese romantic musical film starring Sai Sai Kham Leng, Poe Mamhe Thar and Aye Myat Thu. The film produced and distributed by Frenzo Production premiered in Myanmar on March 5, 2020 and became one of the highest-grossing films.

== Synopsis ==
"Music" never gets old and neither does "Love". The story is telling that music and love are the most fundamental companions regardless of the time.

== Cast ==
- Sai Sai Kham Leng as Aggar Sai
- Poe Mamhe Thar as Poe Maddi
- Aye Myat Thu as Wutyi Cho
- Kyaw Thu as U Khin Maung Set
- Zin Wine as U Thet
- Cho Pyone as Phwar Phwar
- Soe Myat Thuzar as Khin Nwe
- May Thinzar Oo as Daw Mya Oo

== Accolades ==
Award	Category	Recipients	Result
Myanmar Academy Awards	Best Picture	Frenzo Production	Won
Myanmar Academy Awards	Best Director	Mee Pwar	Won
Myanmar Academy Awards	Best Actor	Sai Sai Kham Leng	Won
Myanmar Academy Awards	Best Cinematography	Phyo Kyaw	Won
Myanmar Academy Awards	Best Actress	Poe Mamhe Thar	Nominated
Myanmar Academy Awards	Best Music	Moe Moe	Nominated
