= Gon Shein Pyin Tae Chit Chin Thake Khar =

2006 Burmese Film

- Film Poster
- Burmese: ဂုဏ်ရှိန်ပြင်းတဲ့ချစ်ခြင်းသိက္ခာ
- Directed by: Daw Na
- Screenplay by: Nyein Min
- Starring: Yan Aung; Htun Eaindra Bo; Sai Sai Kham Leng; Thet Mon Myint
- Release date: 2006
- Running time: 144 minutes
- Country: Myanmar
- Language: Burmese

Gon Shein Pyin Tae Chit Chin Take Khar (Burmese: ဂုဏ်ရှိန်ပြင်းတဲ့ချစ်ခြင်းသိက္ခာ) is a 2006 Burmese drama film, directed by Daw Na starring Yan Aung, Htun Eaindra Bo, Sai Sai Kham Leng and Thet Mon Myint.

== Cast ==
- Yan Aung as Chit Oo
- Htun Eaindra Bo as Sin Theingi
- Sai Sai Kham Leng as Thet Nwe Oo
- Thet Mon Myint as Pan Nu Wai
- Nwet Nwet San as Daw Mi Mi Khin
- Saw Naing as U Saw

== Award ==
Year	Award	Category	Nominee	Result
2006	Myanmar Motion Picture Academy Awards	Best Actor	Yan Aung	Won
