= The Elite and the Fish Paste =

2019 Burmese film

- Theatrical release poster
- Burmese: သခင်ကြီးနှင့်ငပိတို့စရာ
- Directed by: Steel (Dwe Myittar)
- Screenplay by: Nay Soe Thaw
- Story by: Zan Thakhin Thway
- Starring: Thet Mon Myint; Htun Ko Ko; Shwe Thamee
- Production company: RB Production
- Release date: 31 October 2019 (Myanmar)
- Running time: 113 minutes
- Country: Myanmar
- Language: Burmese

The Elite and the Fish Paste (Burmese: သခင်ကြီးနှင့်ငပိတို့စရာ; transliterated as "Tha khin gyi hnint ngapi toh sayar") is a 2019 Burmese political action film, directed by Steel (Dwe Myittar) and starring Thet Mon Myint, Htun Ko Ko and Shwe Thamee. The film premiered in Myanmar on 31 October 2019, and was released in Singapore on 7 November 2019.

== Cast ==
- Thet Mon Myint as Joe Joe
- Htun Ko Ko as Sheriff Sithu
- Zin Wine as U Min Paing
- Nay Ye as Ye Aung Paing
- Htoo Char as Pauk Kyi
- Shwe Thamee as Poe Poe
