= Dar Nga Pyuu =

Burmese comedy film

- Burmese: ဓားငပြူး
- Directed by: Kyaw Thar Gyi
- Starring: Myint Myat; Shwe Thamee; Khin Hlaing
- Release date: September 28, 2018
- Country: Myanmar
- Language: Burmese

Dar Nga Pyuu is a Burmese comedy film directed by Kyaw Thar Gyi starring Myint Myat, Shwe Thamee and Khin Hlaing.

The movie was officially released on September 9, 2018 at cinemas around Myanmar.
