= Poe Mamhe Thar =

Burmese actress and model (born 1997)

- ပိုးမမှီသာ
- Born: Poe Mamhe Thar; May 1, 1997 (age 29); Yangon, Myanmar
- Education: University of Medicine 1, Yangon
- Occupations: Actress, Model, Physician
- Years active: 2018–present

Poe Mamhe Thar (Burmese: ပိုးမမှီသာ; born 1 May 1997) is a Burmese actress, model and physician. She made her film debut in the 2021 film Padauk Musical, which earned her a nomination for the Myanmar Academy Award for Best Actress.

== Early life and education ==
Poe Mamhe Thar was born 1 May 1997 in Yangon, Myanmar. She is also the elder sister to a 7-years younger sister. She attended Basic Primary School No. (3) Bahan from Kindergarten until Primary 4, moving onto Secondary School No. (2) Bahan from then on towards until she passed her matriculation exams. She is a physician by training, having attended University of Medicine 1, Yangon. She was picked as the "Queen" (campus queen) as a freshman at the university.

Amidst the COVID-19 pandemic in Myanmar, she, serving as a physician, gathered and effectively managed real-time information to ensure the public remained well-informed about the developments related to COVID-19.

== Career ==
After her appearance in Sai Sai Kham Leng's music video "Thein Ga Ra Ra Tha" (loosely translated as 'bliss/pleasure'), she initiated her acting career in 2018 and achieved significant recognition. Since that time, she has appeared in numerous advertisements and also starred in music videos for various artists. Subsequently, she received offers for TV and films. She was selected brand model for SAI Cosmetix by Sai Sai Kham Leng.

In 2020, she took her first steps into acting with the film Padauk Musical, alongside Sai Sai Kham Leng. Her portrayal of the character garnered praise from her admirers, who lauded her performance and her nuanced interpretation of the role. The movie rose to prominence as one of Myanmar's highest-grossing films, resulting in her nomination for the Myanmar Academy Award for Best Actress and securing four Academy Awards. In 2023, she was appointed as the brand ambassador for Samsung Myanmar.

Her first TV drama, Sparkle Hearts (ရင်ထဲကြွေတဲ့ကြယ်), in which she played the female lead, was aired on December 11, 2023, on Canal+.

== Political activities ==
In the aftermath of the 2021 Myanmar coup d'état, Poe Mamhe Thar emerged as a proactive figure within the anti-coup movement, actively participating in rallies and leveraging social media. She also shared a post on Instagram expressing her strong opposition to the military coup, featuring the statement "Fuck Military Coup" alongside a picture of Aung San Suu Kyi. In her message, she emphasized that she, along with other Myanmar citizens, stands in opposition to the military coup. She further asserted her belief that such actions inflict the most severe suffering on developing countries.

Expressing her condemnation of the military coup, she has been engaged in protests since February. She joined the "We Want Justice" three-finger salute movement, which originated on social media and attracted the participation of numerous celebrities. Moreover, she issued a call to both government authorities and civil servants, urging them to join the Civil Disobedience Movement. She has expressed her readiness to participate in the movement and stands in solidarity with doctors, civil servants, and the people of Myanmar, firmly rejecting any form of injustice.

== Filmography ==
=== Film (Cinema) ===
Year	Title	Burmese Title	Co-Stars	Notes
2020	Padauk Musical	ပိတောက်ကတဲ့ဂီတ	Sai Sai Kham Leng, Aye Myat Thu	
2023	Bound	နှောင်	Nay Toe , Naw Phaw Eh Htar	
2023	Fire	မီး	Nay Win , Aye Chan Mg , Khin Wint Wah	
20245	Magical Moe	ပဉ္စလက်မိုး	Sai Sai Kham Leng May Toe Khaing	
2025	Chit Thu Say Yar	ချစ်သူစေရာ	Tyron , Poe Mamhe Thar	
2025	A Tue	အတူး	Myint Myat , Yan Aung	
2026	My Bodyguard	ကပ်ပူးလေး	Nay Win , Chue Sitt Han , Oak Awe Than Thar	
2026	Gohan		Meechok	Thai film

=== Television series ===
Year	English title	Myanmar title	Co.Stars	Network	Notes
2023	Sparkle Hearts	ရင်ထဲကြွေတဲ့ကြယ်	Aung Ye Lin , Alinn Yaung , Pan Yaung Chel	Canal+	
2025	Love Equation	အချစ်ညီမျှခြင်း	Nay Toe , San Yati Moe Myint	Canal+	
2025	Tone Loon Tin Pyot	သုံးလွန်းတင်ပျို့	Cham Min Ye Htut , Phu Sone , Su Pan Htwar	Mahar Tv	

== Awards and nominations ==
=== Academy Awards ===
Year	Award	Category	Nominated work	Result
2020	Myanmar Academy Award	Best Actress	Padauk Musical	Nominated
2024	Myanmar Academy Award	Best Actress	Hnaung	Nominated
