= Burmeton =

2010 Burmese film

- film poster
- Burmese: ဘာမီတွန်
- Directed by: Khin Maung Oo; Soe Thein Htut
- Screenplay by: Khin Maung Oo; Soe Thein Htut
- Story by: Nay Yee Min
- Produced by: Min Mya Aye
- Starring: Yan Aung; Nay Toe; Htun Eaindra Bo; Thet Mon Myint
- Edited by: Nyein Chan
- Music by: Khin Maung Gyi
- Production company: Country Star Film Production
- Release date: 2010
- Running time: 120 minutes
- Country: Myanmar
- Language: Burmese

Burmeton (Burmese: ဘာမီတွန်) is a 2010 Burmese comedy-drama film, directed by Khin Maung Oo and Soe Thein Htut starring Yan Aung, Nay Toe, Htun Eaindra Bo and Thet Mon Myint.

== Cast ==
- Yan Aung as Tain Moe Khaung
- Nay Toe as That Ti
- Htun Eaindra Bo as Kalyar
- Thet Mon Myint as Barani
- Mos as Ko Aww
- Myittar as Bo Tar
- Aye Mya Phyu as child cast
