= From Bangkok to Mandalay =

- Poster of the Film
- ဘန်ကောက် မှ မန္တလေး သို့ Thai: ถึงคน..ไม่คิดถึง
- Directed by: Chartchai Ketnust
- Written by: Chartchai Ketnust, Pattana Chirawong
- Produced by: Natchapon Purikananond, U Sue Won
- Starring: Sai Sai Kham Leng; Pilaiporn Supinchompoo; Nay Toe; Wutt Hmone Shwe Yi
- Cinematography: Sugimasa Yamashita
- Edited by: Surasak Pangolin, Max Tersch
- Music by: Bruno Brugnano
- Production company: Magenta Film Studio
- Distributed by: Hollywood Thailand
- Release dates: 27 October 2016 (Myanmar); 10 November 2016 (Thailand)
- Running time: 127 minutes
- Countries: Myanmar; Thailand
- Languages: Burmese; Thai; English

From Bangkok to Mandalay (Burmese: ဘန်ကောက် မှ မန္တလေး သို့; Thai: ถึงคน..ไม่คิดถึง) is the film cast by Myanmar and Thailand for the goodwill. In this film, Myanmar movie stars, Nay Toe, Wutt Hmone Shwe Yi, Sai Sai Kham Leng and newbie Thailand actress, Pilaiporn Supinchompu (Naam Whan) performed.

== Plot ==
When her grandma tells her that she is living two lives in one, Pin (Pilaiporn Supinchompoo) doesn't understand right away. Her grandma then leaves her ten letters as her inheritance. For half a century, they have remained unopened. Grandma's only rule is that Pin must read each one in the location where it was written. Pin packs a bag and her grandma's ashes and travels to Myanmar to try and use the letters to guide herself out of her complicated life.

In Myanmar, Pin meets Kyaw Kyaw (Sai Sai Kham Leng,) a musician and the only person in Myanmar who knew her grandma. Pin asks Kaye Kaye not to flirt with her and he assents, although he knows that he can't honor this promise.

As the journey progresses, Pin discovers that her grandmother's letters are love notes from a mysterious Burmese gentleman. It is initially unclear why Pin's grandmother never opened these letters and why she kept her admirer a secret. Pin is driven to discover the truth, even if it breaks her heart again.

== Cast ==
- Sai Sai Kham Leng as Moe Naing (Kyaw Kyaw)
- Pilaiporn Supinchompoo as Pin
- Nay Toe as Nanda
- Wutt Hmone Shwe Yi as Thuzar
- Anthony Theil as Father Peter
- Duantem Salitul as Thuzar (old age) (cameo)

== Production ==
The screenwriter and director Chartchai Ketnust was inspired by the Seni Saowaphong's Pisat (ปีศาจ) novel, with the content about love of different classes.

== Awards ==
Year	Award	Category	Nominee	Result
2017	Thailand National Film Association Awards	Best Actor Award	Sai Sai Kham Leng	Nominated
	Thailand National Film Association Awards	Best Supporting Actor Award	Nay Toe	Nominated
	Thailand National Film Association Awards	Best Song	Bruno Brugnano	Won
	Thailand National Film Association Awards	Best Screenplay	Chartchai Ketnust Pattana Chirawong	Nominated
	Thailand National Film Association Awards	Best Original Score	Bruno Brugnano	Nominated
2017	Thailand Film Critic Assembly	Best Supporting Actor Awards	Nay Toe	Nominated
	Thailand Film Critic Assembly	Best Supporting Actress Awards	Witt Hmone Shwe Yee	Nominated
	Thailand Film Critic Assembly	Best Song	Bruno Brugnano	Won

== Shooting Places ==
Myanmar

- Yangon
- Mandalay
- Bagan
- Mingun
- Thibaw
- Pyin Oo Lwin

Thailand

- Bangkok
