= A Nyein Phyu =

Burmese actress

- ဧငြိမ်းဖြူ
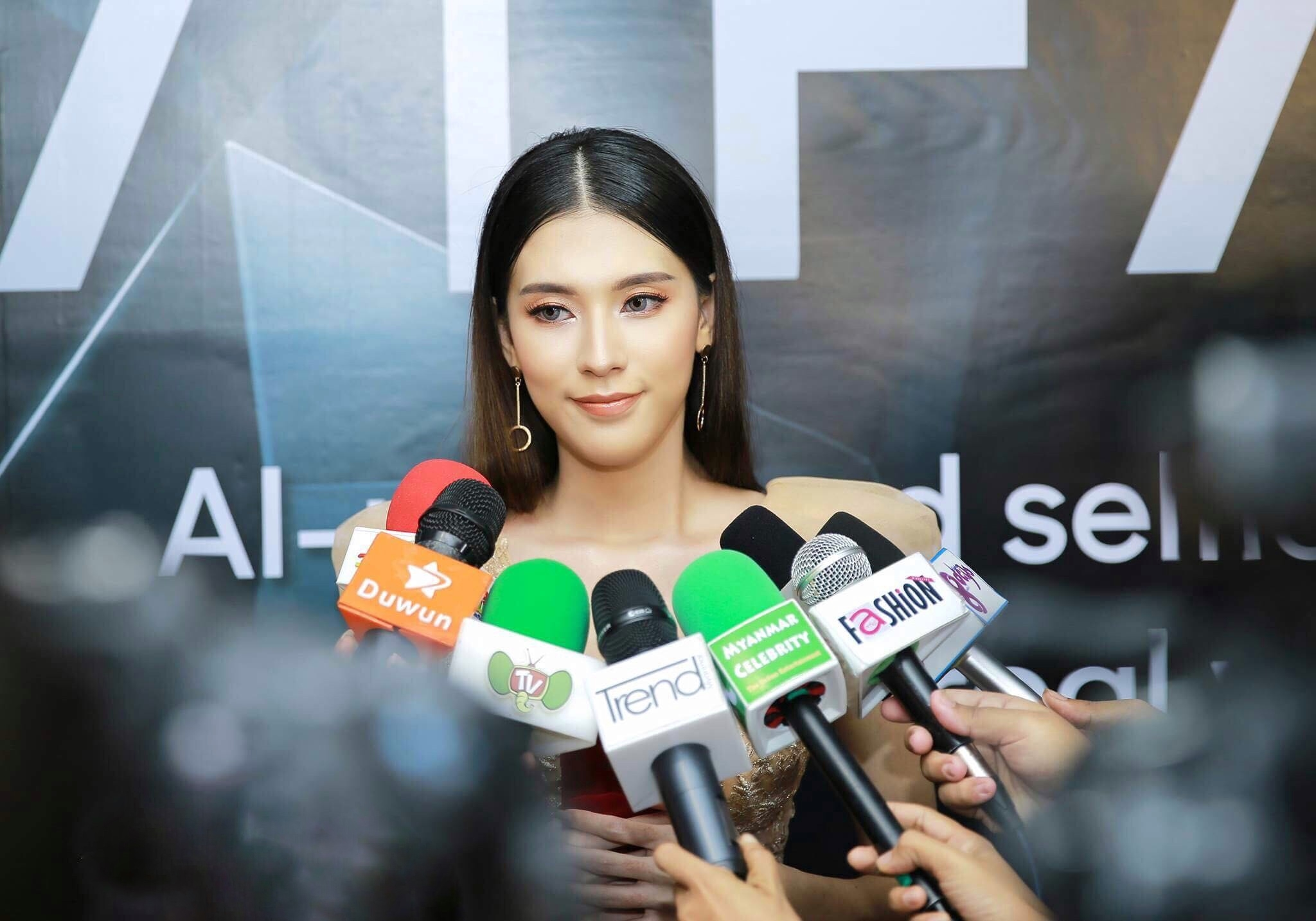
- Phyu in 2019
- Born: 24 April 1996 (age 30); Yangon, Myanmar
- Education: South Essex College
- Occupations: Actress, model, dancer
- Years active: 2003–present
- Height: 168 cm (5 ft 6 in)
- Parents: Min Yan Aung Tun; Thida Lin

A Nyein Phyu (Burmese: ဧငြိမ်းဖြူ; born 24 April 1996) is a Burmese actress, model and dancer. She began her entertainment career as a dancer and had her breakthrough in films in 2013.

== Early life and education ==
A Nyein Phyu was born on 24 April 1996 in Yangon. She comes from an artistic family; her father Min Yan Aung Tun is a film producer, and her mother Thida Lin is a film director. She has one older sibling Saw Yu Nandar, an actress. She attended high school at Basic Education High School No. 1 Dagon. She graduated from South Essex College with a diploma in Performing Arts in 2019.

== Career ==
A Nyein Phyu started her career as a child dancer in the dance group Laurel, when she was 7 years old. In 2012, she founded the art school Laurel Art Academy. In 2013, she was one of the ten youth directors that represented Myanmar at the Mekong-Japan Asean Youth Director contest held in Japan. In the same year, she made her acting debut with a leading role in the film Hmaw Win Nat Hso (Sorcery Satan) alongside Naing Naing, directed by her mother Thida Lin. She has since appeared in six films.

In 2016, she took on her first big-screen leading role in the film Ba De Le Hei La alongside Blake, Saw Yu Nandar, Yan Aung, and Moht Moht Myint Aung. She then starred in her second big-screen film Mi-Yo Phala, is based on the history of traditional Popa nats. In 2017, she starred in her first television drama Pan Gangaw Diary, aired on MRTV-4 in 2019.

== Filmography ==
=== Film (Cinema) ===
- Ba De Le Hei La (ဘာတဲ့လဲဟေ့လာ) (2019)
- Mi-Yo Phala (မိရိုးဖလာ) (2020)
- A (TBA)

=== Film ===
Over 60 films, including

- Hmaw Win Nat Hso (မှော်ဝင်နတ်ဆိုး) (2013)
- Sin Hwei Yan Shaung (ဆင်ဝှေ့ရန်ရှောင်) (2014)

=== Television series ===
- Pan Gangaw Diary (2019)

== Personal life ==
A Nyein Phyu has been in a relationship with the singer Yair Yint Aung since 2017.
