= Nat Khat Mhar Tae Tite Pwal =

Burmese Film

- Theatrical release poster
- Burmese: နက္ခတ်မှားတဲ့တိုက်ပွဲ
- Directed by: Nyunt Myanmar Nyi Nyi Aung
- Screenplay by: The Khit Nay
- Produced by: Nay Lin Aung
- Starring: Nay Toe; Thet Mon Myint; Yadanar Phyu Phyu Aung
- Production company: Star World Film Production
- Release date: November 27, 2015
- Running time: 120 minutes
- Country: Myanmar
- Language: Burmese

Nat Khat Mhar Tae Tite Pwal (Burmese: နက္ခတ်မှားတဲ့တိုက်ပွဲ), is a 2015 Burmese action drama film starring Nay Toe, Thet Mon Myint and Yadanar Phyu Phyu Aung. It is an unofficial remake of the 2006 Indian Tamil language film Varalaru. The film, produced by Star World Film Production premiered in Myanmar on November 27, 2015.

== Cast ==
- Nay Toe as Let Yar, Ye Yint and U Za Byu (triple role)
- Thet Mon Myint as Pann Pan
- Yadanar Phyu Phyu Aung as Nora
- War War Aung as Pann Pan's mother
- Zin Oo as Nora's mother
- May Thinzar Oo as U Za Byu's mother
- Nay San as doctor

== Awards and nominations ==
Year	Award	Category	Nominee	Result
2015	Myanmar Academy Awards	Best Actor	Nay Toe	Won
2015	Myanmar Academy Awards	Best Supporting Actress	Yadanar Phyu Phyu Aung	Nominated
