= Yadanar Khin =

Burmese actress

- ရတနာခင်
- Born: 26 March 1980 (age 45)
- Occupations: Actor; Model
- Spouse: Soe Hlaing Oo (m. 2005)

Yadanar Khin (Burmese: ရတနာခင်) is a Burmese film actress and model, most popular in the 2000s.

She attended the Practising School Yangon Institute of Education. She married her husband, Soe Hlaing U, in 2005, with whom she has three sons, Zwe Oo Htet, Htun Myat Oo, and Kaung Hset Oo. She is currently a restaurateur, with several Burmese-style restaurants in Yangon.
