= Sai Sai Kham Leng =

Burmese musician and actor (born 1979)

- စိုင်းစိုင်းခမ်းလှိုင်
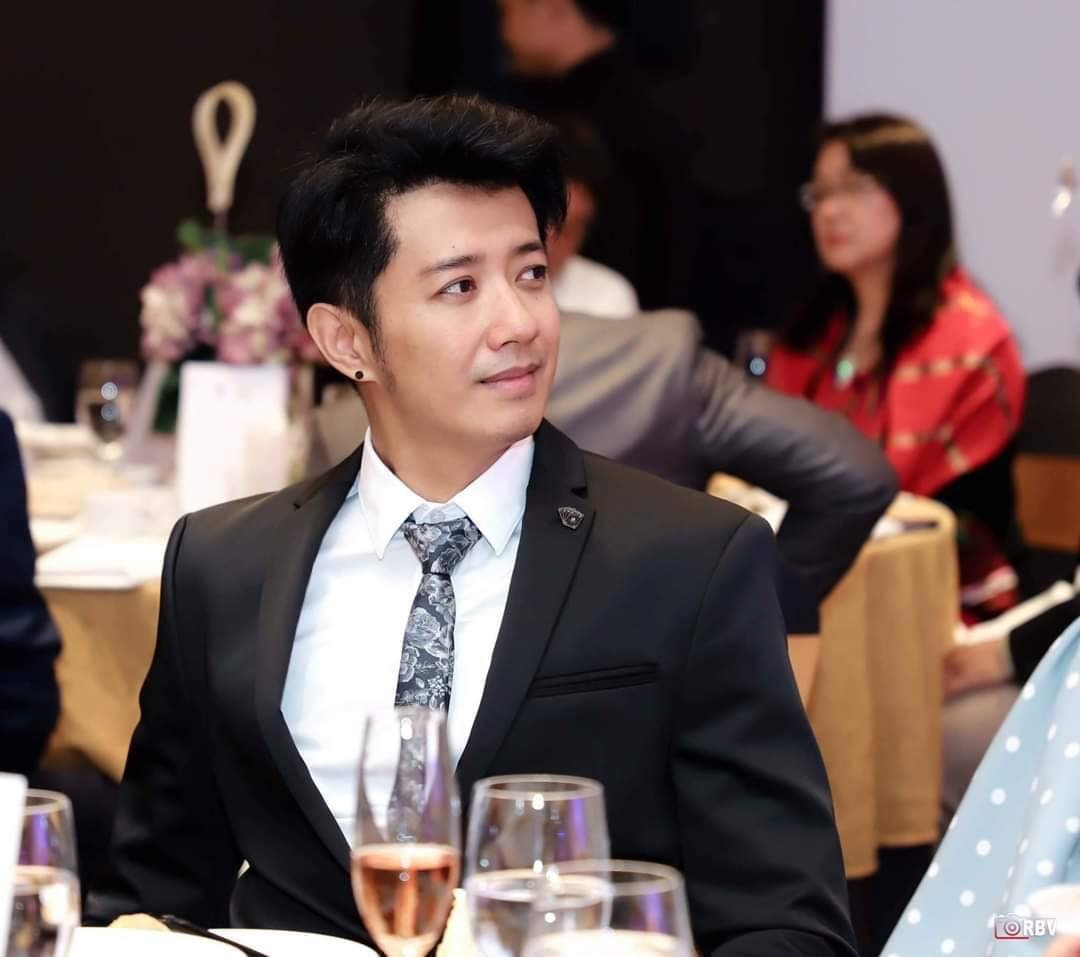
- Sai Sai in 2019
- Born: Sai Sai Kham Leng; 10 April 1979 (age 47); Taunggyi, Shan State, Burma
- Other name: စိုင်းစိုင်း
- Education: Dagon University; Yangon University of Foreign Languages
- Occupations: Singer; songwriter; rapper; actor; model
- Height: 5 ft 10 in (1.78 m)
- Relatives: Tun Sao San (great-grandson)
- Musical career
- Genres: Hip hop, pop
- Instruments: Vocals; piano; guitar
- Years active: 1998–present
- Website: saisaionline.com

Sai Sai Kham Leng (Burmese: စိုင်းစိုင်းခမ်းလှိုင်; pronounced [sáiɰ̃ sáiɰ̃ kʰáɰ̃ l̥àiɰ̃]; also Sai Sai Kham Hlaing; born 10 April 1979) is a Burmese singer-songwriter, novelist, and actor of ethnic Shan descent. He is considered one of the most commercially successful male singers in the history of Burmese hip hop music.

In 2020, he was recognized in Forbes Asia's 100 Digital Stars List which shows Asia-Pacific's most influential celebrities on social media.

== Early life and education ==
Sai Sai Kham Leng was born on 10 April 1979 in Taunggyi, Shan state, Myanmar to Kham Leng and Cho Cho San Tun of an ethnic Shan aristocratic family. His great-grandfather Sao San Tun, Saopha of Mongpawn, was a signatory to the 1947 Panglong Agreement and one of nine senior government officials assassinated on 19 July 1947.

Sai is the eldest among four siblings, having two younger sisters and a younger brother. Soon after he was born, his parents moved to nearby Aungban for two years before moving back to Taunggyi. He graduated high school at B.E.H.S (1) Taunggyi in 1996. His parents divorced when he was in the 4th standard (4th grade). He was living in two homes soon after divorce but ended up with his father. He did not see his mother for another six years. He became a judo player in the eighth standard. He won district-level competitions in high school, and participated in national youth competitions in Yangon. He was admitted to Dagon University majoring English subject and graduated in 2003 and also graduated with the English language from Yangon University of Foreign Languages (Post-grad Diploma) in 2004.

== Music career ==
In 1997, Sai Sai relocated to the then capital city of Myanmar, Yangon, to become a singer. He started out on his music career in 1998, while still a university student, and starred in various karaoke music albums. At that time, hip hop was new to Myanmar and not widely accepted yet by the public at large.

In 1999, Sai Sai started endeavoring to be able to produce and distribute a solo album. He launched his debut album Chocolate Yaung Yayge Einmet (Chocolate-Colored Ice Dreams) in 2000. Unfortunately, the album was a failure, but that did not stop him from standing up and trying again. The follow-up second album "Thangegyin Myar Swar" (Friends) was released in 2001 which turned out to be a success, creating him a place to stand in Myanmar music industry.

In 2003, Sai Sai released his third album "February Mhat Tann". One of the songs from that album, named "One Nal Mhat Tan", hit the number one slot in the country. Other hit singles followed, and the album was a commercial success. Sai became a household name, with hits such as Thu Nge Chin Myar Swar, February Mhattan (February Diary), Ever Golli and Happy Sai Sai Birthday. In 2004, Sai Sai cemented his position with the release of his album "Sai Sai Live in Yangon" which spawned more hits.

Sai Sai embarked on his first solo concert, "Sai Sai Live" in 2004, followed by 'Sai Sai Birthday Show', an outdoor concert, on 10 April 2004 every year, gaining thousands of ticket sales, which is currently the highest number in the Myanmar music industry. The popular concert has since become an annual affair and has gained thousands of ticket sales, which is a large number in Myanmar. Beyond performing, Sai runs Frenzo Music Production and spends time writing, composing, and producing new music as well as directing music videos.

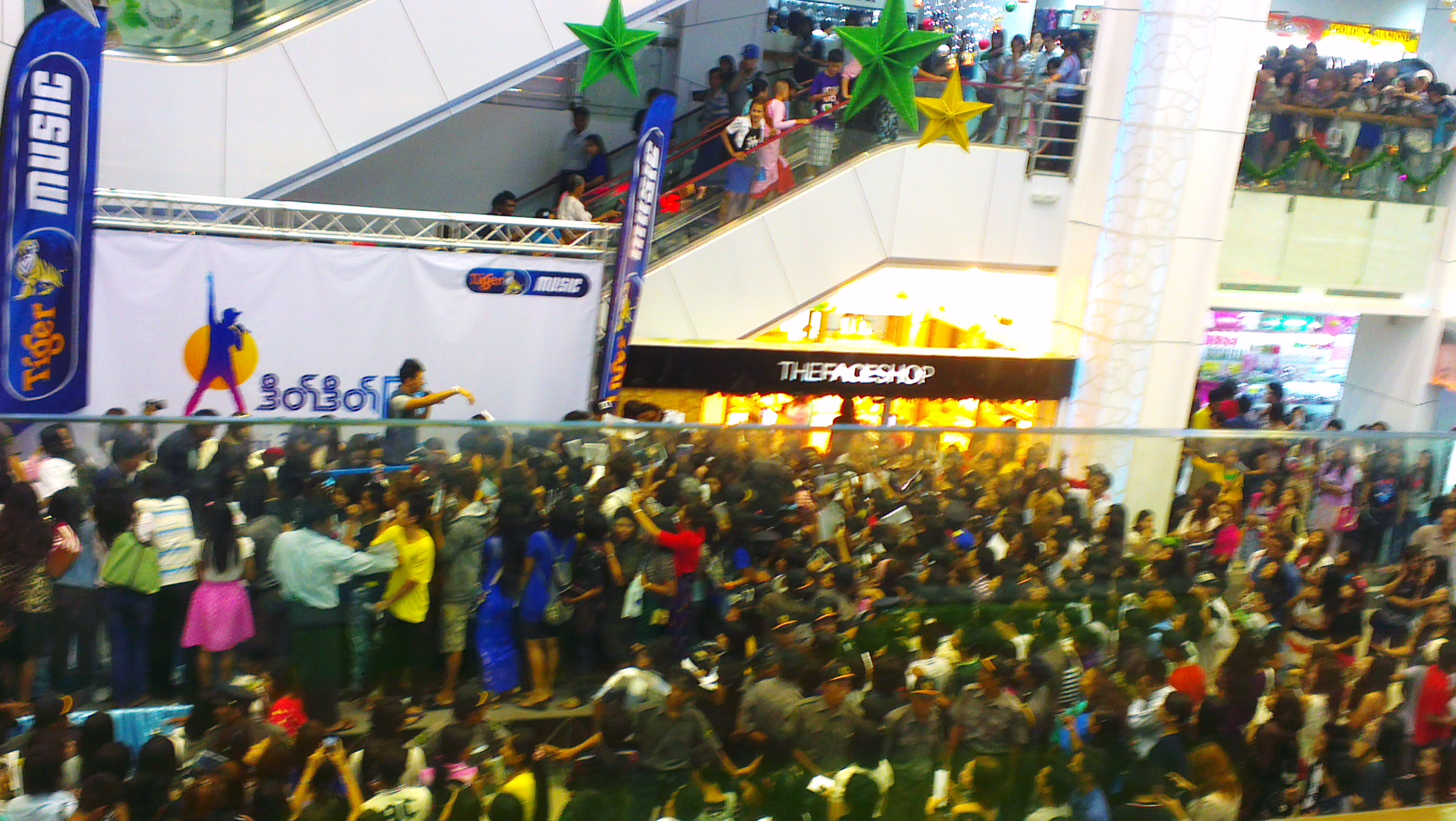
Sai Sai Kham Leng's album "Date Date Kye" release performance in Yangon, 2012

In 2005, Sai Sai released the album "Sai Sai Hu Khaw Thi" (It is Called Sai Sai), and the follow-up albums, "Happy Sai Sai Birthday" was released in 2007, "Ever Golli" (Always Dwifter) was released in 2009, "Date Date Kye" (Topnotch) was released in 2012. In 2013, Sai performed in the opening and closing ceremonies of the 2013 Southeast Asian Games as the home country.

On April 1, 2019, he unveiled an animated music video titled "Nga Yee Zar Ka Po Mite Tal" (My girlfriend is better than yours). The music video was a collaboration with Nay Win, Phyo Lay, Bunny Phyoe, Ki Ki Kyaw Zaw, John, and G Fatt. This lively track was included in his album "Sai Sai is Sai Sai," which had been released a year earlier on April 1, 2018. The music video became widely popular since the day released it on Sai Sai Kham Leng's official Facebook page and YouTube channel, and was praised for the animation quality and music video created by Pencell Studio. That music video was earned 1 M views within 24 hours and then 2 M views in 7 days.

Sai Sai was invited to attend and perform at the ASEAN-Japan Music Festival, which was organised to foster friendship and co-operation between the countries, three times (2013, 2018, and 2019).

== Acting career ==
Sai Sai moved to Yangon in 1997 and joined John Lwin's John International Modeling Agency. He then participated in TV commercials as a model.

Sai Sai has acted in over 50 direct-to-videos in his early acting career. In 2006, he took on his first big-screen role in the film "Mingalabar". He then starred in his second big-screen film "Gon Shane Pyin Tat Chit Chin Thate Khar" where he played the main role with Yan Aung, Thet Mon Myint and Htun Eaindra Bo in 2007.

In 2008, Sai Sai took on his first big-screen leading role in the film "Yin Khon Hninsi".

In 2011, his film Adam, Eve and Datsa, premiered in Myanmar cinemas, and also in Singapore and Los Angeles. In 2015, he starred in the romantic-drama film Slaves of Cupid.

In 2016, he starred in the film Angel of Eden, and then Thingyan Pyatike. He earned his a nomination for the Thailand National Film Association Awards for Best Actor of 2017 with Thai-Burmese film From Bangkok to Mandalay.

In 2020, he received two Myanmar Academy Awards for his work in the film "Padauk Musical"(ပိတောက်ကတဲ့ဂီတ), winning in the categories of Best Actor and Best Film.

== Collaborations ==
Sai Sai collaborated with Burmese singer Bobby Soxer and Coca-Cola Myanmar to launch a song for the 2014 FIFA World Cup campaign, "The World is Ours" by Brazilian-American singer David Correy featuring Brazilian band Monobloco. He worked on a collaboration project with Park Bom (Former 2NE1 member) for a song named "Red Light". Korean-English Version was released on 21 December 2020. On the next day, Myanmar-Korean version was released.

== Brand ambassadorships ==
In 2013, Sai Sai started working as brand ambassador for Coca-Cola in Myanmar. He starred in Coca-Cola's 'Brrr' local television commercial together with singer and fellow ambassador Bobby Soxer. As part of Coca-Cola's 'Open Happiness' campaign to promote the launch of the new 425ml bottle in Myanmar, Sai Sai and Bobby produced the song 'Refreshing Days' in collaboration with the brand.

On 7 September 2013, Sai Sai was appointed as brand ambassador for the global chain of fast-food restaurants in East Asia Lotteria in Myanmar.

In 2014, Sai Sai was appointed as brand ambassador for Dongfeng Motor. He was appointed as brand ambassador for Honda Motorcycles and Samsung Mobile in Myanmar at the same year.

In 2015, Sai Sai was appointed as brand ambassador for WeChat Myanmar, BRAND'S Myanmar, and also became ambassador for mJams Music Store in 2016.

On 11 December 2016, Sai Sai was appointed as brand ambassador for watch brand Casio Edifice in Myanmar. Later, he became the brand ambassador for watch brand G-Shock Myanmar in 2017.

In 2018, Sai Sai became the brand ambassador for the Japanese men's grooming brand GATSBY. Also became the brand ambassador for the world leading company in the digital payment business, VISA on 12 March 2019.

Sai Sai was selected as the first ever South East Asian Artist to release Celebrity VISA Card. It was a collaboration between AYA Bank and VISA.

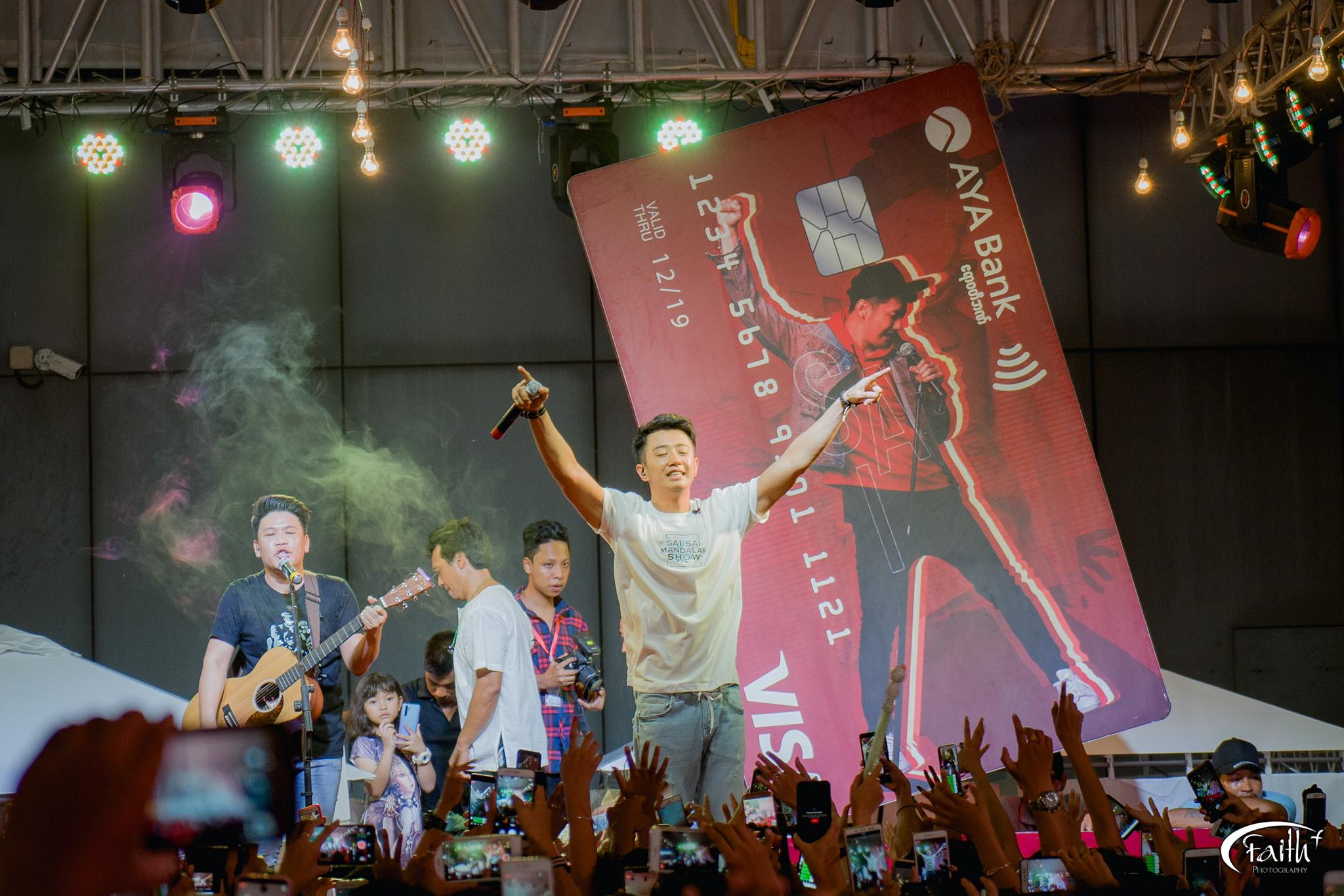
Sai Sai x VISA x AYA (Sai Sai Birthday Show Mandalay 2019)

== Business ==
In 2016, Sai established a trading company called Frenzo Myanmar Company Limited. After that, he launched a new cosmetic series called SAI Cosmetix under that trading company, as he possesses a strong fanbase in Myanmar and most of his fans are girls and ladies of all ages. The products he offers are mainly manufactured in South Korea. He launched three new shades of an Ultra Matte lipstick series; Crush on You, Marry Me, and Xo Xo in October 2016, and "Love is in the Air" mascara.

== Humanitarian work ==
In 2015, Sai Sai was involved in the National Tuberculosis Programme (NTP) Cover Your Cough Campaign, which aimed to increase knowledge about how tuberculosis spreads. In 2016, he continued his advocacy in this area with the Myanmar Unite to End TB Mass Media Programme with the NTP, supported by The 3MDG Fund.

During COVID-19 pandemic, Sai Sai enthusiastically collaborated with Ministry of Health and Sports (Myanmar) to promote awareness and preventive guidelines using his social influence. On April 10, 2020, he celebrated his 16th Birthday Show, SAI SAI BIRTHDAY SHOW IN BEDROOM, from his own house in compliance with social distancing and Stay-At-Home guidelines. The Live Show was broadcast free and raised hundreds of millions kyats for funding to manage the pandemic across Myanmar.

== Political criticism ==
In the aftermath of the 2021 Myanmar coup d'état, he stayed relatively low-profile. On February 2, one day after the coup, Sai Sai Kham Leng changed his profile image to a red square, the color of the NLD, and posted that he hoped everyone was "safe and sound". He showed his support for the peaceful protests and spoke out to respect the votes cast during the 2020 elections and to free the previously detained artists on his official social media accounts. He also joined several protests alongside other famous musicians from Myanmar Music Association in late February. Nevertheless, public opinions turned against him, and their perception of him not doing enough for the cause made him a target of social punishment movements. Many celebrities in Myanmar, including Sai Sai, have ceased their social activities online and offline since then. Business brands that have collaborated with Sai Sai have agreed to end their partnership and some are not yet renewed until further notice.

Sai Sai Kham Leng faced heavy criticism after hosting his birthday show at Yangon's Inya Lake Garden on April 10, 2024, where tickets were sold for 100,000 kyat per person amidst the civil war outbreak in the country.

== Personal life ==
His relationship with actress Wut Hmone Shwe Yee was one of the most talked-about relationships in the Burmese entertainment industry. However, they broke up after some years. Sai is single and lives in Yangon. He expressed that he was unsure about marriage as he comes from a "broken family". He is a Theravada Buddhist.

== Discography ==
=== Studio albums ===
- Chocolate Yaung Yayge Einmet (Chocolate-coloured Icy Dream) (ချောကလက်ရောင် ရေခဲအိပ်မက်) (2000)
- Thangegyin Mya Zwa (Many Friends) (သူငယ်ချင်းများစွာ) (2001)
- February Mhattan (February Diary) (ဖေဖော်ဝါရီ မှတ်တမ်း) (2003)
- Sai Sai Live in Yangon (2004)
- Sai Sai Hu Khaw Thi (It is Called Sai Sai) (စိုင်းစိုင်း ဟု ခေါ်သည်) (2005)
- Happy Sai Sai Birthday (2007)
- Ever Golli (Always Dwifter) (အမြဲတမ်း ဂေါ်လီ) (2009)
- Date Date Kye (Topnotch) (ဒိတ်ဒိတ်ကြဲ) (2012)
- "Sai Sai is Sai Sai" (စိုင်းစိုင်းကစိုင်းစိုင်း) (2018)

=== Collaborative albums ===
- Pyan Pyaw Pya Bo Tawtaw Khet Leit Me (Would Be Quite Difficult to tell) (ပြန်ပြောပြဖို့ တော်တော်ခက်လိမ့်မယ်) (2002)
- Meinma (Woman) (မိန်းမ) (2002)
- A-Chit Mya Zwa A Twet (For All My Love) (အချစ်များစွာအတွက်) (2002)
- Bawa Bawa (Life Life) (ဘဝ ဘဝ) (2003)
- Natthami Ponbyin (Fairy Tale) (နတ်သမီးပုံပြင်) (2004)
- Rock & Rap Live Show (2006)
- A-Lwan Ye Nya (Night of Missing) (အလွမ်းရဲ့ည) (2006)
- A Yin Lo Seit Ma Cha Lo Ba Shin (Because I Can't Trust Anymore Like Before) (အရင်လို စိတ်မချလို့ပါ ရှင်ရယ်) (2006)
- Angel (2006)
- 10 Seconds (၁၀ စက္ကန့်) (2007)
- City FM 2nd Anniversary (2004)
- City FM 6th Anniversary (2007)
- City FM 7th Anniversary (2008)
- City FM 9th Anniversary (2011)

=== Single albums ===
- Red Light (Featuring Park Bom) (2020)

=== Tours ===
- 2004: First Sai Sai Solo Concert (Strand Hotel)
- 2004 to present: Concerts held every year on 10 April for Sai Sai Birthday
- 2014: 10th Concert
- 2016: 12th Concert in 2016
- 2016: Frenzo Music Tour with Ve Ve (Myanmar)

== Filmography ==
=== Film (Cinema) ===
- Mingalabar (2006)
- Gon Shein Pyin Tae Chit Chin Thake Khar (2006)
- Yin Khon Hninsi (2008)
- Adam, Eve and Datsa (2011)
- 12 Kyoe Ka Way (2012)
- Slaves of Cupid (2015)
- Angel of Eden (2016)
- Thingyan Museum (2016)
- Colorful lesson (2016)
- From Bangkok to Mandalay (2016)
- Jone Jone Jat Jat (2017)
- Cho Myain Thaw Let Sar Chay Chin (2017)
- Yee Sar Ta Won Kwal (2018)
- Kyar Tot The Lal Maung Sakar (2019)
- Padauk Musical (2020)
- If My Lover were a Flower (2024)
- Rhythm of the Mind (2024)
- Magical Moe (2024)

== Novels ==
- Sekk-ku Nget (Paper Crane) (စက္ကူငှက်)
- Kan Ko Swel Ywe Hmone Thi Chel..Min Yay Kywl Ei Ma Kyal Ei (We Draw Life By Fortune .. Maybe Bold or not) (ကံကိုဆွဲ၍ မှုန်းသီချယ် မင်ရည်ကျဲ၏ မကျဲ၏)

== Awards and nominations ==
=== Film ===
Year	Award	Category	Nominated work	Result
2010	Myanmar Academy Award	Best Actor	Adam, Eve and Datsa	Nominated
2015	Myanmar Academy Award	Best Actor	Slaves Of Cupid	Nominated
2016	Myanmar Academy Award	Best Actor	Aden Yae Nat Tha Mee	Nominated
2017	Thailand National Film Association Awards	Best Actor	From Bangkok to Mandalay	Nominated
2020	Myanmar Academy Awards	Best Actor	Padauk Musical	Won
2020	Myanmar Academy Awards	Best Film	Padauk Musical	Won
2024	Myanmar Academy Award	Best Actor	Rhythm of mind	Nominated

=== Local Music Awards ===
Year	Award	Category	Nominated work	Result
2006	City FM Award	Best Selling Album of the Year	Sai Sai Hu Khaw Thi (စိုင်းစိုင်းဟုခေါ်သည်)	Won
2007	City FM Award	Best Selling Album of the Year	Happy SaiSai Birthday	Won
2013	City FM Award	Best Selling Album of the Year	Date Date Kyal (ဒိတ်ဒိတ်ကြဲ)	Won
2013	Shwe FM awards	Best Artist award	Himself	Won
2014	Myanmar Music Award	Best Rap Song of the Year (People Choice Award)	N/A	Won
2014	Myanmar Music Award	Icon of the Year	N/A	Won
2014	Shwe FM Award	Best Fashion Award (Male)	Himself	Won
2018	City FM Award	Best Selling Album of the Year	SaiSai is SaiSai	Won
2018	City FM Award	Best Selling Stereo Music Album Production of the Year	Frenzo Production	Won

=== World Music Awards ===
The World Music Awards is an international awards show founded in 1989 that annually honors recording artists based on worldwide sales figures provided by the International Federation of the Phonographic Industry (IFPI). Sai has three nominations from World Music Awards.

Year	Nominee / work	Award	Result	Ref.
2014	N/A	World's Best Male Artist	Nominated	
2014	N/A	World's Best Live Act	Nominated	
2014	N/A	World's Best Entertainer of the Year	Nominated	
