= Nay Htet Lin =

Burmese actor

- နေထက်လင်း
- Born: Akyab, Arakan State, Myanmar
- Occupation(s): Actor, action
- Spouse: Hsu Darli (? - present)
- Children: 2

Nay Htet Lin (Burmese: နေထက်လင်း, also spelt Nay Htet Lynn) is a Burmese actor and film director of Arakan descent.

== Filmography ==
=== Film (Cinema) ===
- Responsible Citizen (ႏိုင္ငံႀကီးသား) 2019
- ဟောက်စား
- Tiger and elephant
- Tain Tway Ngo Loh Moe Phit Tar (2000)

=== Television series ===
- Monetine Ko Rainsine Hkasetth (မုန်တိုင်းကိုရင်ဆိုင်ခဲ့သူ) 2017
