= Zin Wyne =

Burmese actor

- ဇင်ဝိုင်း
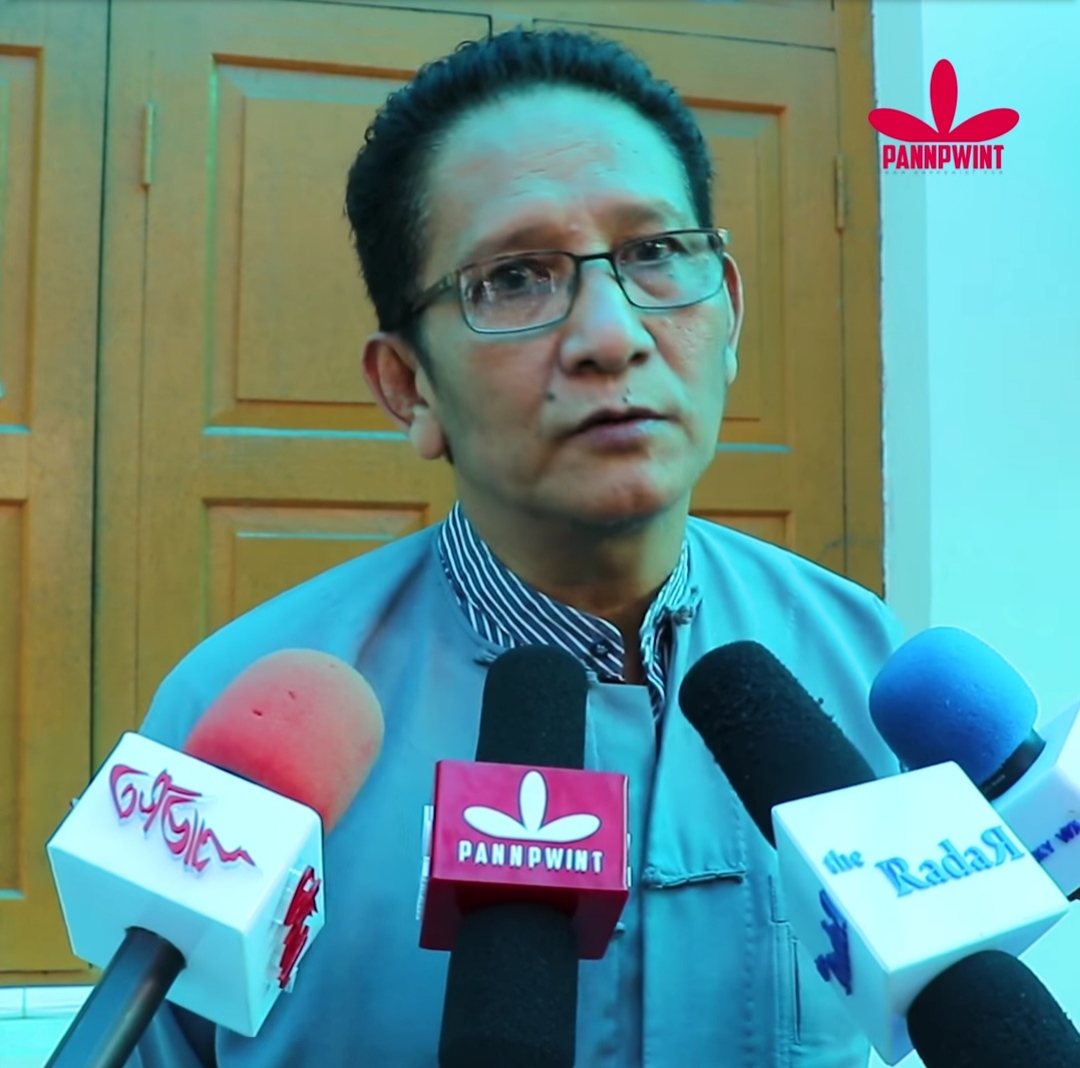
- Zin Wyne in 2019
- Born: Htay Lwin; 18 July 1959 (age 66); Yangon, Myanmar(Burma)
- Occupation: Actor
- Years active: 1981–present
- Children: Min Maw Kun and other
- Parent(s): Sein Lwin; Yi Yi Shein
- Awards: Myanmar Academy Award (Best Supporting Actor for 1997)

Zin Wyne (ဇင်ဝိုင်း, also spelt Zin Wine; born Htay Lwin on 18 July 1959,) is a Burmese film actor. He won the Myanmar Motion Picture Academy Awards two times and served as the chairperson of the Myanmar Motion Picture Organization twice as well.

== Career ==
Zin Wyne entered the film industry in 1973, when he was fourteen. He made his feature film debut in the 1981 film, Thanyawzin Sodar Shidae (lit. 'Samyojana Does Exist'), along with Moh Moh Myint Aung. He experienced a rise in popularity after starring as Thet Htwe in the 1984 film, Thingyan Moe, directed by Maung Tin Oo under whom Zin Wyne had learned cinematography for seven years. He took his first male lead role in the 1991 film Dandaryi (lit. 'Legend'), alongside May Than Nu. Zin Wyne won his first Academy Award in the 1997 film Noble Heart.

After the Myanmar Motion Picture Organization was established as a non-government organization, Zin Wyne was elected as its chairperson in April 2012 but resigned for his health condition in 2014, before his term was due. He re-contested and was elected as the chairperson of the organization on 26 September 2017. On 30 December 2012, because of his efforts, the Myanmar Motion Picture Academy Awards presentation ceremony for 2011 could be held again in Yangon, after four years in the new capital Naypyidaw. In 2012, he became a member of Aung San Film Executive Board, together with Min Htin Ko Ko Gyi, Wyne, Htun Eaindra Bo, Ei Ei Khaing, Zarganar and Lu Min, formed by Aung San Suu Kyi, daughter of the protagonist Aung San.

Zin Wyne anticipated in the 2014 film, Made in Heart, with Pyay Ti Oo, Moe Hay Ko and Wutt Hmone Shwe Yi, and won his second academy award in the category of Best Supporting Actor.

In the aftermath of the 2021 Myanmar coup d'état, on 15 April, Zin Wyne was arrested under the section 505 (a) of the Myanmar Penal Code for encouraging civil servants to join ongoing civil disobedience movement, along with several other celebrities, while his son Min Maw Kun was issued an arrest warrant. He was released on 7 June but arrested again in a few months.

== Personal life ==
Zin Wyne, the fourth of five siblings, was born to retired lieutenant commander Sein Lwin and Yi Yi Shein. He married Khin Nwe Nwe Tun, and the couple had two sons, namely, Kyi Thar Htay Lwin and Kyaw Kyaw Htay Lwin. The latter is better known by his stage name Min Maw Kun.

== Filmography ==
=== Film ===
Some of the 165 films Zin Wyne appeared in:

- Than Yaw Zin Shi Dal (သံယောဇဉ်ရှိတယ်; 1981)
- Thingyan Moe (သင်္ကြန်မိုး; 1985) – Thet Htwe
- Myint Myat Nha Lone Thar (မြင့်မြတ်နှလုံးသား; 1997)
- Myaw Lint Chin Myar Swar (မျှော်လင့်ခြင်းများစွာ; 2006) – U Tin Swe Nyein
- Htar Waya A Linn Tan Myar (ထာဝရအလင်းတန်းများ; 2011)
- Satan's Dancer (2013) – U Htun
- Made in Heart (2014) – U Thitsar
- Lu Gyi Min Khin Byar (လူကြီးမင်းခင်ဗျာ; 2015) – U Myat Min
- My Lovely Hate (2016) – U Toe Min
- Oak Kyar Myet Pauk (အုတ်ကြားမြက်ပေါက်; 2016) – U Sein Oak
- Kunlong Rak 40 (ကွမ်းလုံရက်၄၀; 2017)
- Original Gangster 2: Black Area (2017) – U Mogok
- Killing Field (2018)
- City Hunters (2019) – U Naung Ye Latt
- Wind Up Dancer (2019)
- Responsible Citizen (2019) – U Kaung Myat
- Sponsor (2019) – U Than Win Naing
- The Elite and the Fish Paste (2019) – U Min Paing
- Bo Nay Toe (2019)
- Hero (2019) – Wutyi's father
- Kan Ma Pha La (ကမ္မဖလ; 2020) – U Nakee
- Golden Princess (2020) – U Kyaw Nyein
- Padauk Musical (2020) – U Thet
- Vein of Love (2023)

== Awards and nominations ==
Year	Award	Category	Nominated work	Result
1985	Myanmar Motion Picture Academy Awards	Best Supporting Actor	Thingyan Moe	Nominated
1997	Myanmar Motion Picture Academy Awards	Best Supporting Actor	Noble Heart	Won
2014	Myanmar Motion Picture Academy Awards	Best Supporting Actor	Made in Heart	Won
2016	Myanmar Motion Picture Academy Awards	Best Supporting Actor	My Lovely Hate	Nominated
2019	Myanmar Motion Picture Academy Awards	Best Supporting Actor	Responsible Citizen	Nominated
