= Wai Lu Kyaw =

Burmese actor and philanthropists

- ဝေဠုကျော်
- Born: Nyaungdon, Irrawaddy Division, Burma
- Occupation: Actor
- Years active: 1997–present
- Parent(s): Tekkatho Nyo Lwin Maung; Tekkatho Nyo Nyo Thein
- Awards: Myanmar Academy Award (Best Supporting Actor for 2010)

Wai Lu Kyaw (Burmese: ဝေဠုကျော်) is a Burmese actor and philanthropists. He won the Myanmar Academy Award for Best Supporting Actor in 2010 with the film The Red Sun Above the Ocean (ပင်လယ်ထက်ကနေဝန်းနီ).

== Biography ==
Wai Lu Kyaw was born in Nyaungdon, Irrawaddy Division, Burma, to Tekkatho Nyo Lwin Maung and Tekkatho Nyo Nyo Thein, both are Burma National Literature Award-winning writers who established the Panhlaing Publishing Press. He began his acting career in 1997 as a child actor, starring in the films With the Green Valley (အစိမ်းရောင်တောင်ကြားနှင့်) and Hna Lone That Pyint Yin Ya Par The (နှလုံးသားဖြင့်ရင်းရပါသည်).

Wai Lu Kyaw is also active in humanitarian and social relief work. He is a member of Myanmar Red Cross Society. He is also a founding member of the Consumer Protection Association, and a member of the Civil Society (Yangon), which splintered from the Free Funeral Service Society following disputes with Kyaw Thu.

== Filmography ==
- Modern Yazawin (2014)
- 39 Bite Pu (2014)
- Kunlong Rak 40 (ကွမ်းလုံရက်၄၀; 2017)
