= Shwe Thamee =

Burmese actress and model

- ရွှေသမီး
- Born: Shwe Thamee; 18 April 1995 (age 31); Mandalay, Myanmar
- Other name: Shwe
- Occupations: Actress, Model
- Height: 5 ft 4 in (1.63 m)

Shwe Thamee (Burmese: ရွှေသမီး) is a Burmese actress and model . She is one of the most successful actresses in Myanmar. Throughout her career, she has acted in over 50 films.

== Filmography ==
=== Film ===
Year	Title	Director	Role
2017	Tar Tay Gyi	Wyne	Nandar
2018	Thone Yaung Chal	Steel (Dwe Myittar)	
2018	Thar Pike Kaung	Steel (Dwe Myittar)	May Yin Kyay
2018	Baw Baw Ka Htaw	Ko Pauk	Saung Wai
2018	Dar Nga Pyuu	Kyaw Thar Gyi	
2018	Toxic Man	Steel (Dwe Myittar)	Tharaphi
2018	Yatdayar	Pyi Hein Thiha	
2019	Lay Par Kyawt Shein Warazain	Thar Nyi	Nay Chi Phyar
2019	Responsible Citizen	Steel (Dwe Myittar)	Chit Su
2019	The Elite and the Fish Paste	Steel (Dwe Myittar)	Poe Poe
2019	Tauk Cha Lite Mal	Khin Hlaing	
2019	Chi	Nyunt Myanmar Nyi Nyi Aung	Ngu

=== Television series ===
- Yin Thway (2024)
