= Nang Khin Zay Yar =

Beauty pageant winner

- နန်းခင်ဇေယျာ
- Nang Khin Zayar in 2014
- Born: 4 March 1988 (age 38); Taunggyi, Burma
- Education: B.A Law (LL.B)
- Occupations: Tour guide, Model
- Height: 5 ft 6.5 in (1.69 m)
- Beauty pageant titleholder
- Title: Miss Myanmar 2012; Miss Yangon 2012
- Years active: 2011 -
- Hair color: Dark
- Eye color: Black
- Major competitions: Miss Myanmar 2012 (Winner); Miss International 2012 (Miss Internet)

Signature
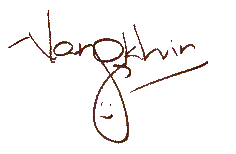

Nang Khin Zay Yar (Burmese: နန်းခင်ဇေယျာ; born in Taunggyi on March 4, 1988) is a Burmese model, actress and beauty pageant titleholder who won Miss Universe Myanmar title in 2012. She also won the Missosology's Miss International 2012 People's Choice Award, Pageantology.net Miss International 2012 People's Choice Award and Miss Internet Award in Miss International 2012, Okinawa.

== Early life ==
Nang Khin Zay Yar was born in Taunggyi on March 4, 1988, to her mother Nang Phyu Phyu Khine and her father Khun Aung Myat. Nang Khin Zay Yar went to Basic Education High School No. 4 Taunggyi. Nang Khin Zay Yar finished her education from Taunggyi University, earning her degree as a Bachelor of Laws. After she finished her education, she opted to become a tour guide instead of a lawyer, shortly afterwards moving into the modelling industry. She can speak both English and German.

== Career ==
Nang Khin Zay Yar became a model in 2011, taking photos for magazines, journals and model websites. In 2012, shortly after she won the title of Miss Myanmar 2012, she was offered to shoot for some advertisements. Currently she is appearing on many Burmese videos and movies as an actress. Although she does not have a clear intention to be a singer so soon, she is already singing both in local and foreign shows and concerts.

== Competitions ==
=== Miss Myanmar 2012 ===
Nang Khin Zay Yar competed in Miss Myanmar 2012 which was held on March 25, 2012, at Myanmar Convention Center (MCC), Yangon. The competition was organized by the Myanmar Tourism Services (MTS) Co., under the supervision of Myanmar Travel Board (MTB) in order to promote tourism industry in the country and enhance the interest of citizens in the tourism sector. Nann Khin Zayar won Miss Yangon title, Miss Myanmar 2012 title and she was assigned as a tourism Ambassador of Myanmar.

=== Miss International 2012 ===
She won the Miss Internet Award in the Miss International 2012 competition.
