= Yan Aung =

Burmese film actor (born 1966)

Academy Yan Aung
- ရန်အောင်
- Born: Hla Htun; 14 December 1966 (age 59); Rangoon, Burma (now Yangon, Myanmar)
- Occupations: Actor; Singer
- Years active: 1985–present
- Notable work: Kyi Thar in Thamee Shin; Dr. U Myint Mo in Myaw Lint Chin Myar Swar
- Parents: Tin Maung (father); Thein Thein (mother)
- Awards: Myanmar Motion Picture Academy Awards

Yan Aung (Burmese: ရန်အောင်; born 14 December 1966) is a Burmese film actor. He has won 7 Myanmar Motion Picture Academy Awards throughout his career, including in 1991, 1995, 1996, 1998, 2000, 2006 and 2023, the highest number of academy award winners in Myanmar History other than Nyunt Win.

Yan Aung was born Hla Htun (လှထွန်း) in Rangoon, Burma (now Yangon, Myanmar) to parents Tin Maung and Thein Thein. He currently participates as a judge on Myanmar Idol.

== Filmography ==
=== Film ===
- A Maiden Like Me Thida (မယ်သီတာလို မိန်းကလေး) (1991)
- Khine Mar Lar Hnin Si (1992)
- A Better Moon in Bagan (ပုဂံမှာ သာတဲ့လ) (1995)
- A Lighter Heaven (အလင်းဖျော့ကောင်းကင်) (1996)
- Night Actor (ညမင်းသား) (1998)
- Ignorant Horse Race (မောဟမျဉ်းပြိုင်) (2000)
- Thamee Shin (2000) – Kyi Thar
- Myet Nhar Myar Tae Kaung Kin (2004) – U Myat Noe Aung
- Thone Thone Le Chit (သုံးသုံးလီချစ်) (2006)
- Glorious People (ဂုဏ်ရှိန်မြင့်တဲ့လူရယ်) (2006)
- Myaw Lint Chin Myar Swar (2006)
- Gon Shein Pyin Tae Chit Chin Thake Khar (2006) – Chit Oo
- Taungthaman Thitsar (2006)
- Mommy Shane (မာမီရှိန်း) (2009)
- Burmeton (2010)
- May Khin Kanyar (2012) – U Bala
- Ko Tint Toh Super Yat Kwat (2014)
- Thu Ngal (2017) – Shwe Thein Maung
- Shal Chway Ma (2018) – Oakkar
- My Country My Home (2018)
- Sign of Moe Pan Pwint (2018)
- City Hunters (2019)
- Wind Up Dancer (2019)
- Jin Party (2019) – Moe Lin Soe
- Gandaba: Strings of a Broken Harp (2020)
- A Red Blanket (2023)
- Aba Baw Ma (2023)

== Album discography ==
Yan Aung has recorded many albums throughout the 1990s, including both cover songs of international hits, as well as Myanmar tune songs. The following is a partial list.

=== Solo albums ===
- Barani ဘရဏီ (1991)
- Lay Nu Aye လေနုအေး (1992)
- Gita Wingabar ဂီတဝင်္ကပါ (1993)
- Gita Wingabar 2 ဂီတဝင်္ကပါ ၂ (1995)
- Sein Si Tae Tay Ta Pote စိန်စီတဲ့တေးတသ်ပုဒ် (1995)
- Yin Khone Than ရင်ခုန်သံ (1996)
- Tan Khu Shwe Sin တန်ခူးရွှေစင် (1997)
- A Kyaw Kyar Sone Tay Myar အကျော်ကြားဆုံးတေးများ (2002)

=== With other artists ===
- Dote Yae Kabar (+ May Sweet, Naw Li Zar, Rama) တို့ရဲ့ကမ္ဘာ (+ မေဆွိ ၊ နော်လီဇာ ၊ ရာမ) (1992)
- Myu Myu Kywa Kywa (+ Hay Mar Nay Win) မြူးမြူးကြွကြွ (+ ဟေမာနေဝင်း) (1995)
- Nway Moe Saung (+ May Sweet) နွေမိုးဆောင်း (+ မေဆွိ) (1996)
- 1500 (+ Various Artists) ၁၅၀၀ (1999)
- Yan Aung Nae Thu Chit Thu Myar (Live Show) ရန်အောင် နှင့် သူ့ချစ်သူများ Live Show (2005)
- Yan Aung Nae Nat Tha Mee Myar (Live Show) ရန်အောင် နှင့် နတ်သမီးများ Live Show (2012)

== TV show ==
He was involved as a Judge in Myanmar Idol season 3 (2018).

== Awards and nominations ==
Year	Award	Category	Nominated work	Result
1991	Myanmar Motion Picture Academy Awards	Best Actor	Mal Thidar Lo Mein-Ka-Lay (The Girl like Mal Thidar)	Won
1995	Myanmar Motion Picture Academy Awards	Best Actor	Bagan Mhar Thar Dae La (Bright Moon at Bagan)	Won
1996	Myanmar Motion Picture Academy Awards	Best Actor	A-Lin Phyaw Kaung-Kin (Pale Light Sky)	Won
1998	Myanmar Motion Picture Academy Awards	Best Actor	Nya Min-Thar (Prince of Night)	Won
2000	Myanmar Motion Picture Academy Awards	Best Actor	Maw-Ha Myin-Pyaing Myar (Ignorance Parallel Lines)	Won
2006	Myanmar Motion Picture Academy Awards	Best Actor	Gon-Shein Pyin-Dae Chit-Chin Theik-Khar	Won
2023	Myanmar Motion Picture Academy Awards	Best Actor	A Red Blanket	Won

== Political activities ==
Following the coup d'etat on February 1, 2021, he participated in the Civil Disobedience Movement (CDM) and chanted slogans for the immediate release of the detained leaders, Aung San Suu Kyi and the leaders from the National League for Democracy.

However, on April 10, 2021, Yan Aung was on a warrant list by the State Administration Council and the junta pressed three charges against him for participating Civil Disobedience Movement which he would face the death penalty if he was arrested along with other celebrities. Within minutes, this information is spreading on Facebook without confirmation which causes him to quit political activities and cooperate with the current military junta that causes criticism and boycott from the people of Myanmar.
