= Min Maw Kun =

Burmese actor

- မင်းမော်ကွန်း
- Born: Kyaw Kyaw Htay Lwin; 26 February 1979 (age 47); Burma
- Occupations: Actor, model, singer
- Years active: 1996–2021
- Height: 5 ft 6 in (168 cm)
- Spouse: Thinzar Hlaing
- Children: 3
- Parent(s): Zin Wine; Khin Nwe Nwe Tun
- Awards: Myanmar Academy Award (Best Lead Actor for 2001)

Min Maw Kun (Burmese: မင်းမော်ကွန်း, born Kyaw Kyaw Htay Lwin, 26 February 1979) is a former Burmese actor, singer, and revolutionary. He received the Myanmar Academy Awards for Best Actor in 2001 for his performance in Good Hearted-Stupid Person. Throughout his career, he has acted in more than 150 films.

In the aftermath of the 2021 Myanmar coup d'état, he retired from his acting career and became a vocal critic of Myanmar's ruling military junta. His active involvement in anti-coup protests resulted in an arrest warrant being issued against him, leading him to flee to the jungle. There, he joined the People's Defence Force and became a revolutionary.

== Early life ==
Min Maw Kun was born on 26 February 1979 in Yangon to Zin Wine and Khin Nwe Nwe Tun.

== Career ==
At the age of 5, he began starring as a child actor in films under the name Chan Myae and became a lead actor by 17. His first film was A Yaite. He also achieved success in his singing career with the music group Myaypeyo. Additionally, he was a member of the Burmese traditional anyeint troupe, Htawara Hninzi. Established in 2007, the troupe has hosted many charity fundraisers over the past 15 years.

== Political activities ==
Following the 2021 Myanmar coup d'état, Min Maw Kun was active in the anti-coup movement both in person at rallies and through social media. Denouncing the military coup, he has taken part in protests since February. He joined the "We Want Justice" three-finger salute movement. The movement was launched on social media, and many celebrities have joined the movement.

On 2 April 2021, warrants for his arrest were issued under section 505 (a) of the Myanmar Penal Code by the State Administration Council for speaking out against the military coup. Along with several other celebrities, he was charged with calling for participation in the Civil Disobedience Movement (CDM) and damaging the state's ability to govern, with supporting the Committee Representing Pyidaungsu Hluttaw, and with generally inciting the people to disturb the peace and stability of the nation.

Within hours of the announcement that the newly appointed chairman of the Myanmar Motion Picture Organisation under the military council would take over, actor Min Maw Kun resigned as a member. He also left from the Htawara Hninzi. He fled to the jungle and a remote area controlled by the Democratic Karen Buddhist Army (DKBA) before relocating to a Karen National Union (KNU)-controlled area. Later, he joined the People's Defence Force and became a soldier. Alongside others, he co-founded the D-Day Channel, a broadcasting platform focusing on revolutionary topics such as safety measures and weapon handling.

On 28 August 2022, his homes and business property were confiscated by the military council. He is active on his Facebook profile named Kyaw Kyaw Htay Lwin, where he criticizes the anti-junta stance and argues for boycotts on military-linked celebrities. He often scolds nationals who are not interested in politics and do not support the revolution. He is nicknamed "the people's brother". When he scolds people, netizens frankly say, "ကိုကျော် ဆူပြီ" (Ko Kyaw scolded).

On 30 July 2022, he relocated to Australia as a political refugee. With his acting career on hiatus, he is dedicated to advocating for change by actively participating in protests and engaging with members of parliament. He is now a fundraiser for the National Unity Government and the People's Defense Force. Reflecting on his journey, he expressed,

"I was once famous and successful, but I have nothing left now. Do I regret anything or feel sad? Not one bit... When I hear about people being arrested, killed, executed, or their homes being burned down, it fills me with anger. However, I believe I have grown more mature. I never imagined I would become a rebel in the jungle or move to another country."

On 30 June 2024, Min Maw Kun held a fundraising event titled "Artistic Weapons for the Revolution" at the community center in Osaka, Japan. Burmese people residing in Japan attended the event in full force.

== Personal life ==
Min Maw Kun is married to Thinzar Hlaing, and they have two sons named Min Myat and Aeka Phone Myat, as well as one daughter named Laypyay Thway.

Year	Award	Category	Nominated work	Result
1997	Myanmar Motion Picture Academy Awards	Best Actor in a Leading Role	The Shadow	Nominated
2001	Myanmar Motion Picture Academy Awards	Best Actor in a Leading Role	Good Hearted-Stupid Person	Won
2003	Myanmar Motion Picture Academy Awards	Best Actor in a Leading Role	Value Of Mother's Milk	Nominated
2003	Myanmar Motion Picture Academy Awards	Best Actor in a Supporting Role	Moon That Born From Sun	Nominated
