= List of Burmese films =

A list of films produced in Myanmar (Burma). Film production began in Burma in the 1910s and has produced many motion pictures, although many films have been lost or concealed for political reasons.

== 1920s ==
Title	Director	Cast	Genre	Notes
1920
Love and Liquor	U Ohn Maung	Nyi Pu, Aye Kyi, Maung Maung Chit, Maung Maung Kalay, Pu		U Mg Mg
1921
Kyay Taw Thu Ma Nu				
1922
Shwe Pay Lo Ma Ya				
Tain Ta Lone				
Massage Practitioner	Par Gyi	Par Gyi, Khin Khin Nu	Comedy	Short film
1923
Ah Ba Yae				
Taw Myaing Soon Ka Lwan Aung Phan or Nostalgia Effects of the Jungle				
1924
Pauk Kyine				
Ta Khine Lone Shwe				
Ta Khine Lone Sein				
1925
Mhine Wai Wai				
Pa Loke Toke Toke Sakya Shin				
1926
Village boy Shwe Yoe				
Shwe Min Won				
Where is Shwe Yoe				
1927
Shwe Yoe and San Phae				
Shwe Talay				
Khin Maung Gyi				
1928
1929
Honeymoon Period				
Wai Lwin Lwin				

== 1930s ==
Title	Director	Cast	Genre	Notes
1930
Mr Bachelor				
Love Triangle				
1931
1932
Ngwe Pay Lo Ma Ya	Tot Gyi	Aye Ko, Khin Maung Nyunt, Khin May Gyi, Chit Tin Gyi, Mandalar Thaung		First Burmese audio film
1933
Shwe Pay Lhwar				
1934
A Pyo Lin (အပ်ိဳ႕လင္)				
The Emerald Jungle	Maung Tin Maung	Daw Myint Myint, U Chit Shwe, U Ba Saw Gyi	Adventure	
1935
The Daughter of Japan	Nyi Pu	Nyi Pu, U Tin Pe, San Nyunt, Mitsuko Takao		
1936
1937
Boycotter	Ba Zin, U Nu	Aung San, U Nu, U Raschid, U Htun Ohn, Tin Swe	Political drama	
1938
Chitthamya				
1939

== 1940s ==
Title	Director	Cast	Genre	Notes
1940
Chit A Mhya	Tin Maung	Tin Maung, May Shin, May Myint, Bo Thaung, Saing Tin	Drama	
Chit Yay Sin	Tin Maung	Tin Maung, May Shin, Thar Gaung, Saing Tin, Ba Shin	Drama	
Thuzar	Chan Tun	Ba Tint, Khin Maung Yin, Khin Khin Ye		
1941
1942
1943
1944
1945
1946
1947
1948
Chit A Nu Myu				
1949

== 1950s ==
Title	Director	Cast	Genre	Notes
1950
1951
Thu Chit	U Chan Tun		Romance	Screened at the Asian Film Week in China
1952
Lay Htae Ka Phu Sar				
Chit Thet Wai	Tin Maung	Tin Maung, Kyi Kyi Htay, Thein Zaw, May Lwin, Thar Gaung	Romantic drama	
Mayarr Ne`t Apyo				
Chit Ywayt Khor Yar				
Mar Lar Yie				
1953
Mya Hay Wun				
Yadanabon				
The Saung Hay Man				
Pwe` Khar Nyaung Yay				
1954
The People Win Through	Jobisite Jr.	Bo Ba Ko, Maung Maung Ta, Hla Maung Lay, Khin Maung Zaw, Kyaw Thaung	Political drama	
Or Meinn Ma				
Akyor Amor				
May May				
1955
Chit Ma Ma				
Phoe Pyonn Cho	Mya Maung	Po Par Gyi, Zeya, Tin Tin Mu, Win Mar, Ba Chit		
Kot Yin Thwaye				
1956
Bawa Thanthayar				
Chit Kwint Ma Pine				
Yann Ngwayt Tha Way Way				
1957
Chit Nyi Ma				
Mg' Yu Par Yone				
Chit Nyi Ma				
Dr. Aung Kyaw Oo				
Bo Mya Din				
Mya Pann Wut Ye				
1958
Chit Tar A Man Bae				
Swe` Tet Myittar				
Phyay Yort Khway				
1959
Mya Pan Wit Yee				
Moe Lone Pat Lae				
Naung Yan Nyi Naung				
Chit Tort Chit Te`				
Ka Kyee Yay Ka				
Bo Aung Naing				
Sakawma	Maung Chit	Aye Ngwe Gyi, Khin Maung Zin, Kyi Kyi Htay	Drama	

== 1960s ==
Title	Director	Cast	Genre	Notes
1960
Myit Tar Shwe Yi				
1961
Thu				
Nga Ba	Chit Khin	A1 Nyunt Maung, May Nwe, Bago Mae Myint, Kyi Sh		
1962
A twe				
Nit Youk Tae Nay Chin Tae				
1963
Mwe So Taw Main Ka Lay				
Saung Ta Nya Wal	Bogalay Tint Aung	Win Oo, Wah Wah Win Shwe	Drama	
1964
Maung Mu Paing Shin	Aung Win	Htun Wai, Collegian Ne Win, Daisy Kyaw Win, Khin Than Nu, Than Nwet	Drama	
Thi Kyar Say Thet Thay Nhyun	Thukha	Win Oo, Wah Wah Win Shwe, Than Aung, Khin Than Nu, Zeya	Drama	
1965
Mone May Par Naing	Win Oo	Win Oo, Tin Tin Mu, Thi Thi, Wah Wah Win Shwe, Aung Lwin	Drama	
1966
First Class	Tha Du	Htun Wai, Myat Mon, Thaw Ta Swe, May Nwet, Kyi Maung	Drama	
1967
Ko Yal Toe Yal Soe Soe Yal	Tin Maung	Nyunt Win, Khin Than Nu	Drama	
1968
Ban To Lu Lay Nae Thu Zar				
Nge Kywan Swe	Bogalay Tint Aung	Htun Htun Win, Aung Lwin, Nwet Nwet Mu, Aye Aye Thin	Drama	
Tein Hlwar Moht Moht Lwin	San Shwe Maung	Win Oo, Myint Myint Khin, Aung Lwin, Khin Lay Swe, Phoe Par Gyi	Drama	
Zagar Pyaw Thaw Athel Hnalone	Thukha	Soe Naing, Tin Tin Nwe, Kyi Kyi Htay, Myo Nyein, Thein Maung	Drama	
1969

== 1970s ==
Title	Director	Cast	Genre	Notes
1970
Kyun Ma Mhar Main Ma Thar	Thukha	Soe Naing, Daisy Kyaw Win, Tin Tin Nwet, Thein Maung, Jolly Swe	Drama	
La Kwe` Moe Hnaunn				
Thi Thar Pyonn				
Nu Nu Nge` Nge`				
Wearing Velvet Slippers under a Golden Umbrella	Maung Wunna	Myat Mon, Myat Lay, Thet Naung, Kyaw Min, May Myat Swe	Drama	
Hmone Shwe Yee	Win Oo	Win Oo, Sandar Lin, Myat Thu, Khin Than Nu, Aung Lwin	Drama	
1971
1972
Aww Main Ma Main Ma	Thukha	Nyunt Win, Cho Pyone, Kyauk Lone, Thein Maung, Jolly Swe	Drama	
1973
Mone Par Tal Maung Ko	Tin Htun Naing	Win Oo, Myint Myint Khin, Phoe Par Gyi, Aung Lwin	Drama	
Bal Thu Pyaing Lo Hla Par Taw Naing	Thukha	Zaw One, Win Hlaing, Tin Tin Nyo, Tin Tin Hla, Eant Kyaw	Drama	
Zar Khann Zee Nauk Kwe` Hmar				
Eik Met Da Darr				
Tender Are the Feet	Maung Wunna	San San Aye, Zaw Lwin, Aung Pyae, May Nwè, Aung Soe	Drama	
1974
1975
Kya Nor Ne`t Ko Ba Kyaw				
Shway Gye Ngway Gye Tann Par Loe	Thukha			One of first two Burmese films to be screened abroad
Kyaye Gyue: Ka Bar				
1976
Shwe Gaung Pyaung	Toe Nyunt	Toe Nyunt, Myo Thant, Sai Wunna, Win Hlaing, Sandar	Action	
1977
It Only Gets Warm When the Sun Shines				
1978
Lu Zaw	Zaw Htet	Collegian Ne Win, Kyaw Hein, Kyi Kyi Htay, Swe Zin Htaik, Myint Naing	Drama	
1979
Chit A Mhya	Thukha	Zaw Lin, Khin Yu May, Cho Pyone, Eant Kyaw, Jolly Swe	Drama	One of first two Burmese films to be screened abroad
A Kar Ka A Chit A Hnit Ka Myittar	Thukha	Collegian Ne Win, Kyaw Hein, Swe Zin Htaik, Sein Khin, San Ma Tu	Drama	

== 1980s ==
Title	Director	Cast	Genre	Notes
1980
Chan Myay Per Say 1980				
Mha ta par a char ma shi pi				
1981
Tay Zar	Myo Myint Aung	Collegian Ne Win, Kyaw Hein, San Shar Tin, Swe Zin Htaik, May Nwet	Drama	
1982
Moon Tae Chain Twin Nay Win The	Kyaw Hein	Kyaw Hein, Cho Pyone, Moht Moht Myint Aung, Khin Khin Thite, May Thit	Drama	
1983
Chit Tae Yet Ko Kyo Nay Mal	U Tin Yu	Collegian Ne Win, Kyaw Hein, San Shar Tin, Nwet Nwet Mu, Aung Lwin	Drama	
1984
Nu Lone Thar Myo Tae				
1985
Thingyan Moe	Maung Tin Oo	Nay Aung, Zin Wine, Khin Than Nu, May Than Nu, Zaw One	Drama	Academy Award
1986
Lwan Nay Mal Ma Ma	U Tin Yu	Kyaw Hein, Cho Pyone, Swe Zin Htaik, Zaw Htoo, May Thit	Musical drama	
1987
1988
Ngwe Hlaing Zar Paw Hmar				
1989
Khat Sain Sain Nay Par Mae				

== 1990s ==
Title	Director	Cast	Genre	Notes
1990
Achit Sonn Thue Yet` Yin Hmar				
Ayainn Zabe`				
Khun Hna Sin A Lwan	Maung Wunna	Thu Maung, Khin Than Nu, Zaw Lin, Su Hlaing Hnin	Drama	
Sone Yay	Kyi Soe Tun	Kyaw Hein, Khin Than Nu, Zin Mar Oo and Min Oo	Drama	
Poppy Ma	Tin Than Oo		Drama	
1991
Dan Dar Ye				
Me` Thetar Lo Meinn Kalaye				
Tha Mee Hnint Amay Myarr				
Yahan sa thaw sun tanta				
1992
Khain Mar Lar Hninn Ze				
Mue Pain Chit Thue				
The Khuet Pann				
1993
Myit Tot Ei Maryar				
Sein Khor Nay Te`t Achit				
Thidar Khun Na Tan				
1994
Ma Thudamasari	Kyi Soe Tun	Kyaw Ye Aung, Moht Moht Myint Aung, Zaw Lin, Myint Myint Khine, San San Aye	Drama	
Nor Yin Hmway				
Ta Pyi Thu Ma Shwe Htar	Sin Yaw Mg Mg	Kyaw Thu, May Than Nu, Aung Pyae, Zin Min, Wyne	Drama	
Tha Ra Phue				
Wai Lae Mhway Kyway Lae Mhway	Khin Maung Oo, Soe Thein Htut	Dwe, Kyaw Hein, Myint Myint Khine, Tint Tint Tun	Military drama	
1995
Aung Myin thaw Nayt				
Bagan Hmar Thar Te`t La				
Taik Pwe` Khor Than				
1996
Achit Yee Zarr				
Ah Linn Hpyawt Kaunn Kin				
Myit Mo Taun Oo Ma Ka Kyue Thar				
Pan Thakhin				
Tha-thet-ta Hta-wa-ra				
Thar Tha Mee Za Nee Kyin Yar				
1997
A May Chay Yar	Khin Maung Oo, Soe Thein Htut	Dwe, Cho Pyone, May Than Nu, Honey Htun, Zaw Oo		
Ayeik				
Myit Myat Hna Lonn Thar				
Never Shall We Be Enslaved	Kyi Soe Tun	Nyunt Win, Nay Aung, Kyaw Thu, Kyaw Ye Aung, Lwin Moe	Historical war drama	
Yin Khwin Nan Taw	Malikha Soe Htike Aung	Nyunt Win, Dwe, Htun Eaindra Bo, Nandar Hlaing, Yan Naung	Drama	
1998
Ahnainn Met Yin Gwin				
Nga Minn Thar				
Shway Na Thar San Ein				
1999
The Akha Way				
Aphayt Nay Yar				
Hnaun Htonn Phwe`t Myitta				
Hnaunn Ta Myayt Myayt				
Yin Hte` Ka Saunn Yar The				

== 2000s ==
Title	Director	Cast	Genre	Notes
2000
Hna Khann Htat Ka Darr Thwarr				
Hna Yauk Ta Eain Met	Naung Htun Lwin, Nyi Nyi Htun Lwin	Dwe, Htet Htet Moe Oo, Min Khit, Wyne, Kyi Lae Lae Oo	Drama	
Ma Mone Lay Nae Ngapali	Sin Yaw Mg Mg	Yan Aung, Dwe, May Than Nu, Eaindra Kyaw Zin, Moe Di	Drama	
Maung Mu Paing Shin	Ko San Aung	Dwe, Lwin Moe, Htun Eaindra Bo, Htet Htet Moe Oo, Myint Myint Khin	Romantic musical drama	
Maw Ha Myin Pyaing Myarr				
Nga Ye` Tharr				
Thamee Shin	Khin Maung Oo, Soe Thein Htut	Yan Aung, Dwe, Eaindra Kyaw Zin, Khin Than Nu, Cho Pyone	Drama	
2001
A Chit Ka Ma Mae Tat Bu	Mg Pyaih Wa (Pan Wai Thi)	Dwe, Soe Myat Thu Zar, A Yine, Khot Thol, Poe Phyu, King Kong		
A Chit Phat Than Yar Dae Tha	Nyunt Myanmar Nyi Nyi Aung	Min Maw Kawn, Tun Eaindra Bo, Soe Myat Nandar		
Pan Ta Pwint Phan Sin Chin	Kyi Phyu Shin			
A Chit Ko Myaw Phar Chin	Mg Tin Oo			
Shwe Yung Lwan Thaw Ma Nat Phan Lay Myar	Nyunt Myanmar Nyi Nyi Aung			
Eaint Mat Yar Thi	Mee Pwar			
Pon Lar Lar Pyaw Thain Youn	Naung Tun Lwin and Nyi Nyi Tun Lwin			
Pyin Sa Lat Yin Kwin	Malikha Soe Htaik Aung			
San Shwe Myint Ye' One Nae Ya Mar Lar One Thar Ya Mar Lar Mi Thein Kyi	San San Win			
Thin E' Chit Hla Swar Thaw	Mee Pwar			
Swe Myo Taw Yin Bae Lo Khall Ma Lae'	Kyaw Hein			
Hna Lonn Hla Lu Might	Mg Tin Oo			
Pyan Pyaw Pya Poe Taw Taw Khite Late Mae	Maung Myo Min(YIn Twin Phit)			
Kaunn Kin Htet Ka Pan Ta Paint	Nyunt Myanmar Nyi Nyi Aung			
Sae Paung Kha Tae Nya	Kyaw Thu			
Sait Ma Shi Nae Chit Kyi Ma Loe	Mike Ti			
Yin Hte Mar Bar Nyar Bar Nyar	Naung Tun Lwin, Nyi Nyi Tun Lwin			
Chit Chinn Ei A Char Met Hanit	Zin Yar Maung Maung			
Tha Mi Migh	Khin Maung Oo Soe Thien Htut			
2002
A Chit The Lay Pyay	Ko Aung Min Thein	Dwe, Eaindra Kyaw Zin, Sai Bo Bo, Phyo Ngwe Soe, Smile	Romantic drama	
Shwe Hmon Kye` Tet Kaung Kin				
Ma Nyein Thaw Mee	Naung Htun Lwin, Nyi Nyi Htun Lwin	Dwe, Moht Moht Myint Aung, Nandar Hlaing, Nay Aung, Cho Pyone	Drama	
Min Nae Mha Chit Tat Pyi	Khin Maung Oo, Soe Thein Htut	Dwe, Eaindra Kyaw Zin, Nay Aung, Thu Maung, Wyne	Romantic drama	
Nyar thuetapar Yauk Kyarr Meinn Ma				
Ponner Bakun				
Pyaw-Shwin-Chin-Gabar				
San Yae				
Yauk Khama So Tar Ta Khar Tone Ka ThaMet Par pal				
Secret Heart Beat	Malikha Soe Htike Aung	Dwe, Htet Htet Moe Oo, Yaza Ne Win, Aung Lwin	Romantic drama	
2003
A-Chit So Thaw A-Yar				
Achit Hnint Thu Ei GoneTheikKhr				
Chit Par Naw Maunt Ko				
Ah Mae Noh Hpoe				
Hna-Lone Hla Lu Might				
Nay Ka Mway Tae La	Maung Tin Oo	Kyaw Hein, Min Maw Kun, Tint Tint Htun, Eaindra Kyaw Zin, Zaw Win Naing	Drama	
Hnit Yauk Ma Shi Bu				
The Second Romeo				
Dar Bae Naw	Maung Maung Oo (Snow White)	Dwe, Nine Nine, Nandar Hlaing, Kyi Lae Lae Oo, Cho Pyone	Comedy drama	
Let's Have Fun; Pyaw Lite Kya Ya Aung				
Padauk Pinle	Maung Tin Oo	Yaza Ne Win, Htun Eaindra Bo, Zaw One, Zarganar, Kutho	Musical drama	
Nhyoe Thaw Pinlal Swal Ngin Thaw Lamin	Kyi Phyu Shin	Dwe, Htun Eaindra Bo, Byite, Nyi Nyi Nay Naing, Yadanar Khin	Romantic drama	
The Only Son				
Legend of a Little Bird				
No Competition; Pyine Bet Ma Shi				
Love and its Honor				
Trading Women	David A. Feingold		Documentary	Co-production with the United States
Thu Mwe Hta Thittsar				
Centred On The Sea Beyond The Coast				
Father				
Incomparable Composition Of References				
Harted Competition				
I'm Your Neighbour's Husband Wife				
The Dark Green Moon				
Reminiscent Days				
No Two				
True and Palpitated Love				
Thway	Koji Chino	Kyaw Thu, Akari Asou, Min Maw Kun, Myo Thanda Tun, Toshiyuki Nagashima	Period drama	Co-production with Japan
2004
Ta Khar Ta Yan Hni A Chit The Ei Tho Phit Tat The	Malikha Soe Htike Aung	Dwe, Htet Htet Moe Oo, Ye Aung	Romantic drama	
Nauk Ma Kya Kyay	Mg Myo Min (Yin Twin Phit)	Dwe, Khine Thin Kyi, Eaindra Kyaw Zin, Aung Lwin, Nhat Pyaw Kyaw	Musical	
Chit-chin-nge-pyaing				
Eain Met Nat Thamee	Khin Maung Oo, Soe Thein Htut	Dwe, Htun Eaindra Bo, Eaindra Kyaw Zin	Drama	
Pay Set Thu Do Nyint Lone Thar				
Smile Lightly				
Thingyan Way Way				
The Love Bandit; Chit Lu Mite				
What's the Most Important				
Style	Mite Tee	Lwin Moe, Yar Zar Nay Win, Pyay Ti Oo, Soe Myat Nandar, Eaindra Kyaw Zin	Romantic comedy	
The Sorcerer's String				
Reciprocating the Gift of Mother's Milk				
You Need To Ponder On the Verge Of Becoming A Brother-In-Law				
Beware of the Smile				
Two and One				
Myet Nhar Myar Tae Kaung Kin	Maung Myo Min	Yan Aung, Lwin Moe, Tint Tint Htun, Eaindra Kyaw Zin, Phoe Kyaw	Drama	
2005
True Love or Chit-chin-nge-pyaing				
Bee Lu				
Mystery of Snow	Sin Yaw Mg Mg	Lwin Moe, Nyunt Win, Lu Min, Soe Myat Nandar	Musical adventure drama	
Kyan Sit Min	Lu Min	Lu Min, Nyunt Win, Aung Khaing, Nyi Nanda, Htet Htet Moe Oo	Historical drama	
Let's Be Happy; Pyaw Laik Ya Aung				
Kaba Sone Hti	Khin Maung Oo, Soe Thein Htut	Htun Htun, Eaindra Kyaw Zin, Wyne Su Khine Thein	Musical drama	
Mingala Bar		Nay Toe, Sai Sai Khang Leng		
Beyond the Horizon	San Shwe Maung	Lwin Moe, Yan Kyaw, Htun Eaindra Bo, Khine Thin Kyi, Myat Kay Thi Aung	Drama	
Hexagon; Sathtagan	Kyi Soe Tun			
2006
Yadanar	Ei Ei Khaing	Kyaw Thu, Pho Thaukkya, Zaganar, Kyaw Kyaw Paing Hmu, Htun Eaindra Bo	Drama	
Gon Shein Pyin Tae Chit Chin Thake Khar	Daw Na	Yan Aung, Htun Eaindra Bo, Sai Sai Kham Leng, Thet Mon Myint, Nwet Nwet San	Drama	
Taungthaman Thitsar	Maung Nanda	Yan Aung, May Than Nu, Ye Aung, Nawarat, Dwe	Drama	
Hlae Sar	Thein Maung (Phoenix)	Kyaw Ye Aung, Dwe, Thar Nyi, Khine Thin Kyi, Moe Di	Comedy drama	
Myaw Lint Chin Myar Swar	Maung Myo Min	Htun Htun Win, Zin Wine, Yan Aung, Ye Aung, Dwe	Drama	
Modern A Chit	Nyunt Myanmar Nyi Nyi Aung			
Shwe Moe Theal				
Mit Ti Lay Myar				
Lwan aung ye tat thu	Mg Wanna			
Pya Dar Mae Man	Maung Maung Oo (Snow White)			
Pan Pyo thu do a lin Kar	Hein Soe			
2007
Kou: hse hsa tar late mae				
2008
Ngar dhar, ngar thway, ngar irrawaddy My Sword, My Blood, My Irrawaddy	Tun Aung Zaw			
Oe sal sa thar late mal It Will Be 9 or 10 Times Better				
Yin nint aung hmway Smells Good to the Heart				
Ah may hnint tha mee myar A Man Who Doesn't Belong to Society				
Kyoe Tann	Mee Pwar	Kyaw Hein, Kyaw Ye Aung, Soe Myat Thuzar, Htun Eaindra Bo, Zaw Win Naing	Drama	
2009
Zaw Ka Ka Nay The	Mee Pwar	Nay Toe, Nandar Hlaing, Pearl Win, Nyunt Win, Heavy Phyo	Drama	
Kyow Kyar Taung Pan Khat Than	Sin Yew Mg Mg	Nay Toe, Kyaw Kyaw Bo, Eaindra Kyaw Zin, Wyne Su Khaing Thein	Drama	
A take ye a yeik	Zin Yaw Mg Mg	Aung Thura, Eaindra Kyaw Zin	Drama	
Kyauk Sat Yay	Wyne	Myint Myat, Soe Myat Thuzar, May Than Nu, Htun Eaindra Bo, Khin Than Nu	Drama	
Moe Nya Einmet Myu	Kyi Phyu Shin	Nay Toe, Moe Hay Ko, Thinzar Wint Kyaw, Soe Pyae Thazin, Aung Lwin	Drama	

== 2010s ==
Title	Director	Cast	Genre	Notes
2010
Lar Htar Ar Bwar	Ko Zaw	Nay Toe, Wai Lu Kyaw, Yan Aung, Nan Da, Thet Mon Myint, Christina	Comedy	
Nat Phat Tae Sone Twal Myar	Ko Zaw	Pyay Ti Oo, Nan Da, Eindra Kyaw Zin, Soe Myat Thuzar, Thet Mon Myint	Comedy	
Pin Lal Htet Ka Nay Won Ni	Khin Mg Oo + Soe Thein Htut	Lu Min, Wai Lu Kyaw, Kyaw Kyaw, Han Lay	Drama	
Swe Tayar Mg Ta Kyeit	Mee Pwa	Pyay Ti Oo, Khant Si Thu, Khine Thin Kyi, Khine Hnin Wai	Comedy	
Burmeton	Khin Mg Oo, Soe Thein Htut	Nay Toe, Yan Aung, Htun Eindra Bo, Thet Mon Myint, Mos	Comedy	
Ango Myat Lone Apyone Myat Nhar	Min Ote Soe	Min Ote Soe, Mos, Lin Zar Ni Zaw	Drama	
Yin Bat Kyi Nae Chit Lite Mae	War War Win Shwe	Pyay Ti Oo, Yan Aung, Moe Hay Ko, War War Win Shwe	Comedy	
New Model	Ko Zaw	Nay Toe, Yan Aung, Soe Myat Thuzar, Thazin, Thinzar Wint Kyaw	Comedy	
Heart Hti Tal	Nyunt Myanmar Nyi Nyi Aung	Thu Htu San, Moe Aung Yin, Eindra Kyaw Zin, Thinzar Wint Kyaw	Comedy	
Good Shal Tha Mat	Nyi Nyi Tun Lwin	Nay Toe, Kyaw Kyaw Bo, Moe Hay Ko, Soe Pyae Thazin	Comedy	
Achit Lar Lar Htar	Nyi Nyi Tun Lwin	Min Maw Kun, Khant Si Thu, Moe Aung Yin, Kyaw Kyaw Bo, Eindra Kyaw Zin, Khine Thin Kyi, Melody, Soe Pyaw Thazin	Comedy	
A May Kyay Zu Satt Phu Chin Tal	Khin Saw Myo (A Phay Pyinnyar)	Pyay Ti Oo, Nay Aung, Thet Mon Myint, May Than Nu, Min Thu, Wah Wah Aung	Drama	
Kyauk Thin Pone Tway Moe Htar Tae Eain	Ko Zaw (Ar Yone Oo)	Pyay Ti Oo, Kyaw Ye Aung, Thet Mon Myint, Soe Myat Thuzar, Chaw Yadanar	Comedy	
Lotus at Dawn	Tin Than Oo	Min Maw Kun, Ye Lay, Wine Su Khaing Thein, L Sai Ze	Period drama	
Adam, Eve and Datsa	Wyne (Own Creator)	Pyay Ti Oo, Sai Sai Kham Hlaing, Thet Mon Myint, Ye Aung, Htun Htun Win	Romantic drama	
2011
A Lan Zayar	Nyi Nyi Htun Lwin	Thu Htoo San, Moe Aung Yin, Moe Hay Ko, Thinzar Wint Kyaw, Nan Su Yati Soe	Romantic comedy	
The Moon Lotus	Sin Yaw Mg Mg	Nine Nine, Thet Mon Myint, Phyo Ngwe Soe, May Kabyar, Ye Aung	Romantic drama	
2012
Kayan Beauties	Aung Ko Latt	Hin Mai, New Ni Win, Khin Mar Win, Rose Mary, Francis	Thriller	
Aung Padin Inn Padaung	Win Tun Tun	Nay Toe, Thet Mon Myint, Bay Lu Wa, Kin Kaung	Comedy	Original title: အောင်ပဒင် အင်ပဒေါင်း
Red Cotton Silk Flower	Wyne (Own Creator)	Pyay Ti Oo, Soe Myat Thuzar, Phway Phway	Drama	
2013
Satan's Dancer	Wyne (Own Creator)	Nay Toe, Thet Mon Myint, Heavy Phyo, Yoon Yoon, Zin Wine	Drama	
Nat Nat Shine Shine Mhar	Win Tun Tun	Pyay Ti Oo, Ye Aung	Drama	Original title: နက်နက်ရှိုင်းရှိုင်းမှား
2014
The Monk	The Maw Naing	Kyaw Nyi Thu, Han Nawe Nyein, Thein Shwe, Moe San	Drama	
Black Sheep	Win Tun Tun	Nay Toe, Thet Mon Myint, Khine Thin Kyi, Thinzar Wint Kyaw	Drama	
Bo Ma	Na Gyi	Ye Deight, Phway Phway, Aye Mya Phyu	Psychological drama	
2015
Online Paw Ka Wit Nyin	Nyi Nyi Htun Lwin	Nay Toe, Phway Phway, Zay Ye Htet, Chan Mi Mi Ko, Aung Lwin	Romantic horror	
Golden Kingdom	Brian Perkins	U Zawtica, Shine Htet Zaw, Ko Yin Saw Ri, Ko Yin Than Maung, Ko Yin Maung Sein	Drama	Co-production with the United States
Mingalar Hlae	Ko Zaw (Ar Yone Oo)	Khant Si Thu, Pyay Ti Oo, Nay Min, Soe Myat Thuzar, Moe Hay Ko	Comedy drama	
Lu Gyi Min Khin Byar	Nyi Nyi Htun Lwin	Pyay Ti Oo, Wutt Hmone Shwe Yi, Zin Wine, Nyi Htut Khaung, Chan Mi Mi Ko	Drama	
Chit San Eain 2028	Hein Soe	Lu Min, Htun Eaindra Bo, Pyay Ti Oo, Eaindra Kyaw Zin, Nay Toe	Romantic comedy	
I'm Rose, Darling	Wyne (Own Creator)	Nay Toe, Phway Phway, Heavy Phyo, Yoon Yoon	Drama	
Slaves of Cupid	Wyne (Own Creator)	Nay Toe, Sai Sai Kham Leng, Phway Phway	Romantic drama	
A Thet Ko A Thet Htet Po Ywae Chit The	Ko Zaw (Ar Yone Oo)	Aung Ye Lin, Phway Phway, Thar Nyi, San Htut, Soe Myat Thuzar	Romance	
Nat Khat Mhar Tae Tite Pwal	Nyunt Myanmar Nyi Nyi Aung	Nay Toe, Thet Mon Myint, Yadanar Phyu Phyu Aung, War War Aung, Zin Oo	Action drama	
2016
My Lovely Hate	Wyne (Own Creator)	Aung Ye Lin, Thet Mon Myint, Wutt Hmone Shwe Yi, Zin Wine, Nwet Nwet San	Drama	
Angel of Eden	Mee Pwar	Sai Sai Kham Leng, Paing Phyo Thu, Mari Cole, Wint Yamone Naing, May Grace	Legal drama	
Luu Yadanar Treasure	Ko Zaw (Ar Yone Oo)	Kyaw Ye Aung, Nay Min, Kaung Pyae, Thar Nyi, Soe Myat Thuzar	Romantic period drama	
Unsilent Potato	Sein Lyan Tun	Potato	Documentary	Short film
Oak Kyar Myet Pauk	Nyunt Myanmar Nyi Nyi Aung	Htun Htun, Nay Toe, Nay Min, Thet Mon Myint, Soe Myat Thuzar	Drama	
The Gemini	Nyo Min Lwin	Okkar Min Maung, Nyein Chan Kyaw, Aye Myat Thu	Romantic drama	first Burmese LGBT film
My Life I Don't Want	Nyan Kyal Say		Drama	Animated short film
The Road to Mandalay	Midi Z	Kai Ko, Wu Ke-xi	Drama	
From Bangkok to Mandalay	Chartchai Ketnust	Sai Sai Khem Leng, Nay Toe, Wutt Hmone Shwe Yi, Nan Wun	Romantic drama	Co-production with Thailand
Professor Dr. Sate Phwar II	Khin Saw Myo	Kyaw Thu, Lu Min, Bay Lu Wa, Aye Myat Thu, Tun Lwin Aung	Mystery	
2017
The Jade World from Manaw Land	JZ Daung Loon	JZ Daung Loon, M Seng Naw, G Taint Saung, Swan Swan Pan, M Jyar Aung	Drama	
Kunlong Rak 40	Pan Gyi Soe Moe	Zin Wine, Ye Aung, Zaw Oo, Min Maw Kun, Wai Lu Kyaw, Yan Kyaw, Nine Nine, Thu Htoo San, Moe Yan Zun, Soe Yan Aung, Nyo Min Lwin	Historical war drama	Shooting began in 2014
Kyun (Slave)	Nyunt Myanmar Nyi Nyi Aung	Nay Toe, Myint Myat, Wut Hmone Shwe Yi	Drama	
The Cloud	Kam Khan Sing	Pau Mun Thang, Thang Deih Sian, Cing Lem Kim, Nem Deih Lam Ciang, Nhang Go Man	Drama	
Diramore	Yu Par Mo Mo, Nay Chi Myat Noe Wint	Diramore	Documentary	Short film
Shaky Little Fingers	Nay Chi Myat Noe Wint	Esther Khin Aung, Jubilee Tun	Drama	Short film
Sittwe	Jeanne Marie Hallacy		Documentary	Short film Co-production with Thailand and the United Kingdom
Nya	Htoo Paing Zaw Oo	Nyein Thaw, Chan Min Yair Htut, Aung Yair Hteit, Russle, Nat Shine Ko	Psychological thriller	
Kyauk Kyauk Kyauk	Aww Ratha	Nay Toe, Khin Wint Wah, Htun Htun, Nan Myat Phyo Thin, Min Thway	Horror comedy	
Yazawin Yine Thu Myar	Maung Myo Min	Pyay Ti Oo, Pyay Ti Oo, Sue Sha Naing	Drama	
Nay Chi Hmar Shwe Yi Laung	Zaw Myint Oo	Kyaw Htet Aung, Aye Myat Thu, Kyaw Kyaw, Nan Myat Phyo Thin, Chan May Hsue	Drama	Original title: နေခြည်မှာရွှေရည်လောင်း
Yin Bat Htae Ka Dar	Wyne (Own Creator)	Pyay Ti Oo, Eaindra Kyaw Zin, Htun Eaindra Bo, Myat Kay Thi Aung, Nwet Nwet San	Drama	
Tar Tay Gyi	Wyne (Own Creator)	Nay Toe, Shwe Thamee, Aung Min, Zaw Oo, Than Myaing	Horror comedy	
Eternal Mother	Sin Yaw Mg Mg	Nay Toe, Wutt Hmone Shwe Yi, May Than Nu, Ye Aung, Htun Ko Ko	Biographical drama	
3Girls	Wyne (Own Creator)	A Linn Yaung, Phway Phway, Ei Chaw Po, Paing Phyo Thu	Horror	
2018
Dimensions	Nyan Htin	Alice Ong, Khar Ra, Ja Seng Ing, Min Myat Soe San, Win Myaing	Action thriller	Winner of Myanmar Motion Picture Academy Awards category of Best Music
Shwe Kyar	Wyne (Own Creator)	A Linn Yaung, Phway Phway, Thinzar Wint Kyaw	Drama	
Reflection	Lu Min	Htun Eaindra Bo, Eaindra Kyaw Zin, Wutt Hmone Shwe Yi, Suu Sha Naing	Action	All lead actors are female in this film
The Mystery of Burma: Beyond the Dote-hta-waddy	Arkar	Nine Nine, Ah Moon, Zaw Zaw Aung, Naw Aung, Joe Moreira	Action-adventure	
The Storm That Kissed Me	Aung Zaw Lin, Win Lwin Htet	Hlwan Paing, Yair Yint Aung, Phway Phway, Nay Aung, Ye Aung	Drama	
Our Beloved (Kyuntawto Chitthaw)	U Win Saung	Soe Yan Aung, K Nyi, That Ti, Moe Yu San, Shwe Thun Kha	War	
Baw Baw Ka Htaw	Ko Pauk	Myint Myat, Joker, Khin Hlaing, Hsu Eaint San, Shwe Thamee	Comedy	
Kyway	Thar Nyi	Hlwan Paing, Ei Chaw Po, Tyron Bejay, Ye Aung, Soe Myat Thuzar	Drama	
Sign of Moe Pan Pwint	Ko Pauk	May Myint Mo, Yan Aung, Soe Myat Thuzar, Han Lin Thant, Ye Aung	Drama	
Mhaw Kyauk Sar	Win Tun Tun	Myint Myat, Shwe Hmone Yati, Tun Tun (Examplez), May Myint Mo	Historical romantic drama	Production began in 2014
Mi	Na Gyi	Paing Phyo Thu, Nay Toe, Ye Aung, Min Oo, Thar Nyi	Period drama	
Clinging with Hate	Aww Yatha	Nay Toe, Kyaw Kyaw Bo, Min Thway, Phway Phway, Aye Wutyi Thaung	Religious drama	
Toxic Man	Steel (Dwe Myittar)	Nine Nine, Khar Ra, Tun Ko Ko, Shwe Thamee	Action thriller	
Yatdayar	Pyi Hein Thiha	Arr Thit, Nan Su Oo, Su Myat Noe Oo, Shwe Thamee, Yadanar Bo, Khay Sat Twin, Saung Lon San, Myat Thu Thu Zin	Romance	
Killing Field	Thar Nyi	Min Thway, Si Phyo, Nay Ye, Htoo Char, Paing Phyo Thu	Action thriller	
Naung Dwin Oo Dan Twin Zay Dee	Maung Yin Aung	Phoe Chit, A Linn Yaung, Htun Eaindra Bo, Aye Myat Thu, Yadanar Bo	Drama	
My Rowdy Angel	Win Lwin Htet	Hlwan Paing, Khin Wint Wah, Yan Aung, Kyaw Thu, Htun Htun	Romantic comedy	
2019
A Little Daughter's Village	Steel (Dwe Myittar)	Khant Si Thu, Shwe Hmone Yati, Thorn Sat, Tun Ko Ko	Comedy revenge drama	
The Only Mom	Chartchai Ketnust	Nine Nine, Wutt Mhone Shwe Yi, Daung, Pyae Pyae, Ton Ton	Horror	
Hla Taw Thar Hnit Youk Kha Ma Long	Zaw Myint Oo	Khant Si Thu, Ei Chaw Po, Kyaw Kyaw, Goon Pone, Chan May Hsue	Comedy	Original title: လှတောသားယောက္ခမလောင်း
Palpitation in the Breeze	Wyne (Own Creator)	Moht Moht Myint Aung, Phway Phway, Khin Wint Wah, Kyaw Ye Aung, Nine Nine Htet	Drama	
The Milk Ogre	Lu Min	Lu Min, Zay Ye Htet, Shwe Hmone Yati, Myat Mon	Drama	
The Dark Cinema	Pyae Zaw Phyo	Nay Toe, Kyaw Kyaw Bo, Min Thway, Riya Ray, Nan Su Oo	Horror	
Hit Tine	Hein Soe	Eaindra Kyaw Zin, Pyae Pyae, May Than Nu, Mone, Phyo Pa Pa Htoo	Drama	
Guest	Nyunt Myanmar Nyi Nyi Aung	Shwe Htoo, Shwe Hmone Yati, Nay Chi Oo, Phyo Ngwe Soe	Drama	
LadyBoy	Ko Pauk	Pyay Ti Oo, Kyaw Kyaw Bo, Htoo Ag, Ei Chaw Po, Kaew Korravee	Comedy drama	
Two Sisters	Nay Chi Myat Noe Wint	Htet Htet Aung, Yamin Phyo Wai	Drama	Short film Co-production with France
Dan Dar Yee Moe	Win Lwin Htet	Ye Deight, Daung, Shwe Htoo, Wutt Hmone Shwe Yi	Romantic drama	
Puyi Tha	Ko Zaw (Ar Yone Oo)	Khine Thin Kyi, Nay Chi Oo, Kyaw Ye Aung, Khin Hlaing, Ye Aung	Comedy	
Responsible Citizen	Steel (Dwe Myittar)	Nay Toe, Min Maw Kun, Htun Htun, Nay Htet Lin, Nay Myo Aung	Political action	
The Great Myanmar	Jae Sung Jeony, Aung Kyaw Moe	Htike San Moss, Ye Aung, Nine Nine, Warso Moe Oo, Myat Thu Thu	Historical drama	
Jin Party	Yarzawin Ko	Yan Aung, Lu Min, Min Maw Kun, Yair Yint Aung, Htoo Aung	Comedy	
A Mhya.. A Mhya..	Steel (Dwe Myittar)	Khant Si Thu, Eaindra Kyaw Zin, Chit Snow, Yoon May, Lin Zarni Zaw	Horror	
Two Worlds	Arkar	Nine Nine, May Kabyar, May Myint Mo, Pyae Pyae	Drama	
The Elite and the Fish Paste	Steel (Dwe Myittar)	Thet Mon Myint, Htun Ko Ko, Shwe Thamee, Zin Wine, Nay Ye	Action	
Box No. 88	Win Lwin Htet	Nay Toe, Eaindra Kyaw Zin, Hnin Thway Yu Aung, Htun Htun, Kaew Korravee	Drama	
Yoma Paw Kya Tae Myet Yay	Ko Pauk	Myint Myat, Htoo Aung, Aung Yay Chan, Kaung Myat San, Lin Aung Khit	Drama	
Tin String	Arkar	Phyo Ngwe Soe, Eaindra Kyaw Zin, Shwe Eain Si, Ye Naung, Aung Ye Htwe	Horror	
1014	Kyaw Thu	Kyaw Thu, Daung, Htun Ko Ko, Htoo Aung, Moht Moht Myint Aung	Historical drama	
A Flower Above the Clouds	Sin Yaw Mg Mg	Ryu Sang Wook, Kyaw Htet Aung, Wutt Hmone Shwe Yi, May Than Nu	Romantic drama	Co-production with South Korea
Kyauk Kyauk Kyauk 2: Journey to the Death	Aww Ratha	Nay Toe, Nan Su Oo, Htun Htun, May Myint Mo, Tyron Bejay	Horror comedy	

== 2020s ==
Title	Director	Cast	Genre	Notes
2020
3A	Aung Chan Lu	Nan Su Oo, Cham Min Ye Htut, Soe Myat Thuzar, Htoo Charr	Drama	
Kan Ma Pha La	Pan Gyi Soe Moe	Pyay Ti Oo, Min Maw Kun, Moe Hay Ko, Soe Pyae Thazin, Aye Myat Thu	Drama	
Gandaba: Strings of a Broken Harp	Aung Ko Latt, Kitaro Kanematsu	Donnaa Layla, Shunya Shiraishi, Shun Sugata, Win Morisaki, Yan Aung	Musical period drama	
Mya Mya	Nyo Min Lwin	Thinzar Wint Kyaw, Min Taw Win, Dee Dee, Khin Htwe Su Hlaing, Win Tha Pyay Tun	Horror	
Golden Princess	Mee Pwar	Pyay Ti Oo, Kyaw Kyaw Bo, Kaung Pyae, Zin Wine, Cho Pyone	Drama	
Padauk Musical	Mee Pwar	Sai Sai Kham Leng, Poe Mamhe Thar, Aye Myat Thu, Kyaw Thu, Zin Wine	Romantic musical	
Money Has Four Legs	Maung Sun	Okkar Dat Khe, Ko Thu, Khin Khin Hsu, Hein Thiri San, Phay Thadi, Hane Latt	Drama	
2021
What Happened to the Wolf?	Na Gyi	Eaindra Kyaw Zin, Paing Phyo Thu, Kyaw Htet Aung, Aung Myint Myat, Lwin Moe	Drama	
February 1st	Mo Mo, Leïla Macaire	Mo Mo	Documentary	Short film Co-production with France
2022
Midwives	Hnin Ei Hlaing		Documentary	
Myanmar Diaries	Myanmar Film Collective		Collage film	Co-production with the Netherlands and Norway
Way Ma Nay Chin Bu	Nyunt Myanmar Nyi Nyi Aung	Lu Min, Nay Min, Shwe Hmone Yati	Drama	Shot in 2017
The Butterfly Trap	Wyne (Own Creator)	Pyay Ti Oo, Phway Phway, Nay Naw, Kaung Set Htoo, May	Thriller	
The Beginning	Lynn Lynn	Daung, Chit Thu Wai, Bo Bo, Htoo Htoo, Sandy Htun	Drama	Short film
The Road Not Taken	Ko Pauk		Documentary	Short film
2023
Rays of Hope	Ko Pauk	Ko Pauk	Documentary	
The Teacher	Nyo Min Lwin	Mya Yar, Myat, Hnin Wutt Yee, Eaint Jury Mon, Win Lae Shwe Yi	Horror	
A Red Blanket	Tin Aung Soe	Nat Khet, Yan Aung, Soe Myat Thuzar, Soe Myat Nandar, L Sai Zi, Kyaw Zaw Hein	War	
The Way	Lynn Lynn	Chit Thu Wai, Aung Myint Myat, Myat Noe Aye, Aung Lun	Musical drama	Short film
Losing Ground	Anonymous		Documentary	Short film
Never Give Up	Steel (Dwe Myittar)	Nay Toe, Nay Myo Aung, Htun Ko Ko, Soe Myat Thuzar, Aye Myat Thu	Drama	
Our Turn!	Na Gyi	Aung Myint Myat, Paing Phyo Thu, Kaung Kaung (Kyee Kan)	Drama	Short film
Song of Souls	Sai Naw Kham		Documentary	
Vein of Love (or Fourth Capillary)	Thar Nyi	Nine Nine, Shwe Htoo, Thet Mon Myint, May Myint Mo, Zin Wine		Original title: စတုတ္ထမြောက် သွေးကြောမျှင် Shot in 2019
Overdue Rain	Nay Hein	Nay Toe, Moe Hay Ko, Ye Aung, Ye Mon, Thon Myat Kyal Sin	Horror	Shot in 2019
Mone Khwint	Soe Moe Minn	Shwe Htoo, Khin Wint Wah, May Myint Mo, Henry, Min Thu, Nga Pyaw Gyaw	Drama	
Ten Years Myanmar	Thaiddhi, Nay Wunn Ni, Myo Thar Khin, Aung Min	Wutt Yee Kyaw, Thar Ki, Min Htet Khant, Shwe Ye Oo, Kyaw Zeya	Anthology drama	
Broken Dreams: Stories from the Myanmar Coup	The Ninefold Mosaic	Aung, Myat Noe Aye, Priscilla Bawcia, Nay Chi, Japan Gyi	Anthology drama	
Kan Kaung	Win Lwin Htet	Paing Takhon, Thu Htoo San, Khin Zarchi Kyaw, Nay Htut, Kaung Hein Nyi Ghaw	Drama	
2024
If My Lover Were a Flower	Kaung Zan	Khin Zar Chi Kyaw, Sai Sai Kham Leng, Min Oo, Wutt Hmone Shwe Yi, Min Thu	Romance	
Bound	Aww Ratha	Nay Toe, Naw Phaw Eh Htar, Poe Mamhe Thar, Phyo Ngwe Soe, Tin Maung San Min Win	Drama	Original title: နှောင်
MA - Cry of Silence	The Maw Naing	Su Lay, Kyawt Kay Khaing, Nay Htoo Aung, Ko Nanda	Drama	Original title: မ (New Currents winner)
Baik	Soe Moe Min	Kyaw Htet Aung, Shin Hmwe La, Wili, Min Paing, Myat Kay Thi Aung	Comedy	
Jar Kit Sar Pu Thee	Ko Zaw	Lwin Moe, Khant Si Thu, Khine Thin Kyi, Shwe Hmone Yati, A Yine	Comedy	
Einmat Karyan	Win Lwin Htet	Nay Toe, Hlwan Paing, Ni Ni Khin Zaw, Sai Si Tom Kham, Wyne Lay	Musical drama	Original title: အိပ်မက်ကာရန် Began production in 2020
The Art of Cloud	Pwint Thein Gi Zaw	Wutt Hmone Shwe Yi, Aye Chan Maung, Nay Myo Aung, Si Phyo, Nyi Nanda, Melody, Hnin Ya	Drama	
2025
Eain Myaung	Thar Nyi	Kyaw Kyaw Bo, May Myint Mo, Tekkatho Gwanpon, Tun Pale Yadanar, Amy Zan	Horror comedy	Original title: အိမ်မြှောင်
Nat Win The	Win Lwin Htet	A Linn Yaung, Wutt Hmone Shwe Yi, Nay Htet Lin, Charlie, Nyi Nanda, May Than Nu, Myo Thandar Tun, Phu Sone	Supernatural horror	Original title: နတ်ဝင်သည်
2026
Fruit Gathering	Aung Phyoe	Nandar Myat Aung, Nandar Myint Lwin, Thida Soe Khant, Tin Tin Ei, Min Nyo	Romantic drama	Original title: သစ်သီးခူး (Crystal Globe winner)
