= Lady Danger =

2020 Burmese drama film

- Film Poster
- Burmese: လေဒီဒိန်းဂျား
- Directed by: Pwint Theingi Zaw
- Written by: Moe Ni Lwin
- Produced by: Khaing Mar Win
- Starring: Khant Si Thu; Khar Ra; Htun Eaindra Bo; Eaindra Kyaw Zin; Paing Phyo Thu; Mone
- Production company: Shwe Si Taw Film Production
- Release date: February 27, 2020
- Running time: 120 minutes
- Country: Myanmar
- Language: Burmese

Lady Danger (Burmese: လေဒီဒိန်းဂျား, romanized: Lay De Deingyarr) is a 2020 Burmese comedy-drama film starring Khant Si Thu, Khar Ra, Htun Eaindra Bo, Eaindra Kyaw Zin, Paing Phyo Thu and Mone. The film, produced by Shwe Si Taw Film Production premiered in Myanmar on February 27, 2020.

== Cast ==
- Khant Si Thu as U Nay Lin Shein
- Khar Ra as Hnin Maung
- Htun Eaindra Bo as Daw Khin Ma Ma
- Eaindra Kyaw Zin as Yu Ya Zaw
- Paing Phyo Thu as Akyin Nar Moe
- Mone as Phyu Lay Nwe
