= Yin Khwin Nan Taw =

1997 Burmese Film

- Film Poster
- Burmese: ရင်ခွင်နန်းတော်
- Directed by: Malikha Soe Htike Aung
- Screenplay by: Ko Ko Lay
- Based on: Yin Khwin Nan Taw by Lun Htar Htar
- Produced by: Daw Yee Yee Khin
- Starring: Nyunt Win; Dwe; Htun Eaindra Bo; Nandar Hlaing
- Cinematography: San Aung
- Edited by: Maung Yin Htike
- Music by: Thuyekaunglaymyar
- Production company: Malikha Film Production
- Release date: 1997
- Running time: 124 minutes
- Country: Myanmar
- Language: Burmese

Yin Khwin Nan Taw (Burmese: ရင်ခွင်နန်းတော်) is a 1997 Burmese drama film, directed by Malikha Soe Htike Aung starring Nyunt Win, Dwe, Htun Eaindra Bo and Nandar Hlaing.

== Cast ==
- Nyunt Win as Dr. Banyar
- Dwe as Ye Dike
- Htun Eaindra Bo as Thi Tagu
- Nandar Hlaing as Hay Thar
- Yan Naung as Ye Soe
- Hnin Si as Daw Mya Thet
- May Thu Zaw as May Tharaphu
