= Nhyoe Thaw Pinlal Swal Ngin Thaw Lamin =

2003 Burmese Film

- Film Poster
- Burmese: ညှို့သောပင်လယ်ဆွဲငင်သောလမင်း
- Directed by: Kyi Phyu Shin
- Screenplay by: Khin Lay Theint
- Based on: Nhyoe Thaw Pinlal Swal Ngin Thaw Lamin by Lun Htar Htar
- Produced by: Nu Shwe Yi
- Starring: Dwe; Htun Eaindra Bo
- Music by
- Production company: Mahar Htun Film Production
- Release date: 2003
- Running time: 110 minutes
- Country: Myanmar
- Language: Burmese

Nhyoe Thaw Pinlal Swal Ngin Thaw Lamin (Burmese: ညှို့သောပင်လယ်ဆွဲငင်သောလမင်း) is a 2003 Burmese drama film, directed by Kyi Phyu Shin starring Dwe and Htun Eaindra Bo.

== Cast ==
- Dwe as Phone Htut Nay
- Htun Eaindra Bo as Piti Cho
- Byite as Wunna
- Nyi Nyi Nay Naing as Nyi Lin Htin
- Yadanar Khin as Shwe Yoon
- Kin Kaung as Nanda
- Nga Pyaw Kyaw as Kyaw Kyaw
- Saw Naing as U Min Khant
- Goon Pone as Pae Pae
- Tin Tin Hla as Daw Ma Ma Cho
