= Ni Ko Ye =

Burmese writer (1966–2009)

- နီကိုရဲ
- Born: Ye Win; 2 November 1966; Rangoon, Burma
- Died: 23 October 2009 (aged 42); Yangon, Myanmar
- Resting place: Yayway Cemetery, Yangon
- Education: Yangon University
- Occupations: Writer, Director
- Spouse: Naing Naing Win
- Children: 1

Ni Ko Ye (Burmese: နီကိုရဲ), born Ye Win, was a prominent Burmese writer. He published more than 30 objects and wrote more than 100 film, video, radio script. His career began in 1998.

== Biography ==
Ye Win born on November 2, 1966, in Yangon, Myanmar. In 1993, he graduated from Yangon University with a degree in botany. After graduating, his first novel, Ma Kyi Pyar and Her Negative Love was released in February 1998. The book was made into a successful film as Sky Blue Negative and Me, starring Lwin Moe and Htun Eindra Bo. He married Ma Naing Naing Win in 1999. Ngar doht Sarpay(Burmese: ငါတို့စာေပ) republished his first novel, Ma Kyi Pyar and Her Negative Love, a second time in November 2015.

He gained success as a director, script with his original movie, Thit Khat Ngar (Burmese: သစ်ခက်ငါး), starting Dwe and Htet Htet Moe Oo.

He died on October 23, 2009.
