= Frequency (2019 film) =

2018 Burmese film

- Film Poster
- Burmese: ကြိမ်နှုန်း
- Directed by: Khant Mhan Htal
- Screenplay by: Di Di Myint Mo
- Story by: Di Di Myint Mo; Min Paing Myat Thu
- Starring: Eaindra Kyaw Zin; Htun Eaindra Bo; May Po Po Chit
- Cinematography: Vivekanand Santhosham
- Production company: SY Production
- Release date: July 18, 2019
- Running time: 120 minutes
- Country: Myanmar
- Language: Burmese

Frequency (Burmese: ကြိမ်နှုန်း) is a 2019 Burmese horror film, directed by Khant Man Htal starring Eaindra Kyaw Zin and Htun Eaindra Bo. The film, produced by SY Production premiered Myanmar on July 18, 2019.

== Cast ==
- Eaindra Kyaw Zin as Ghost
- Htun Eaindra Bo as Daw Thit Sar
- May Po Po Chit as Nandar
- Shwe Yi Shyun Paing as Kit Kit
- Anna as Yoon Yoon
- May Zin Maung Aye as May Zin
