= Zarganar =

Burmese film director (born 1961)

- ဇာဂနာ
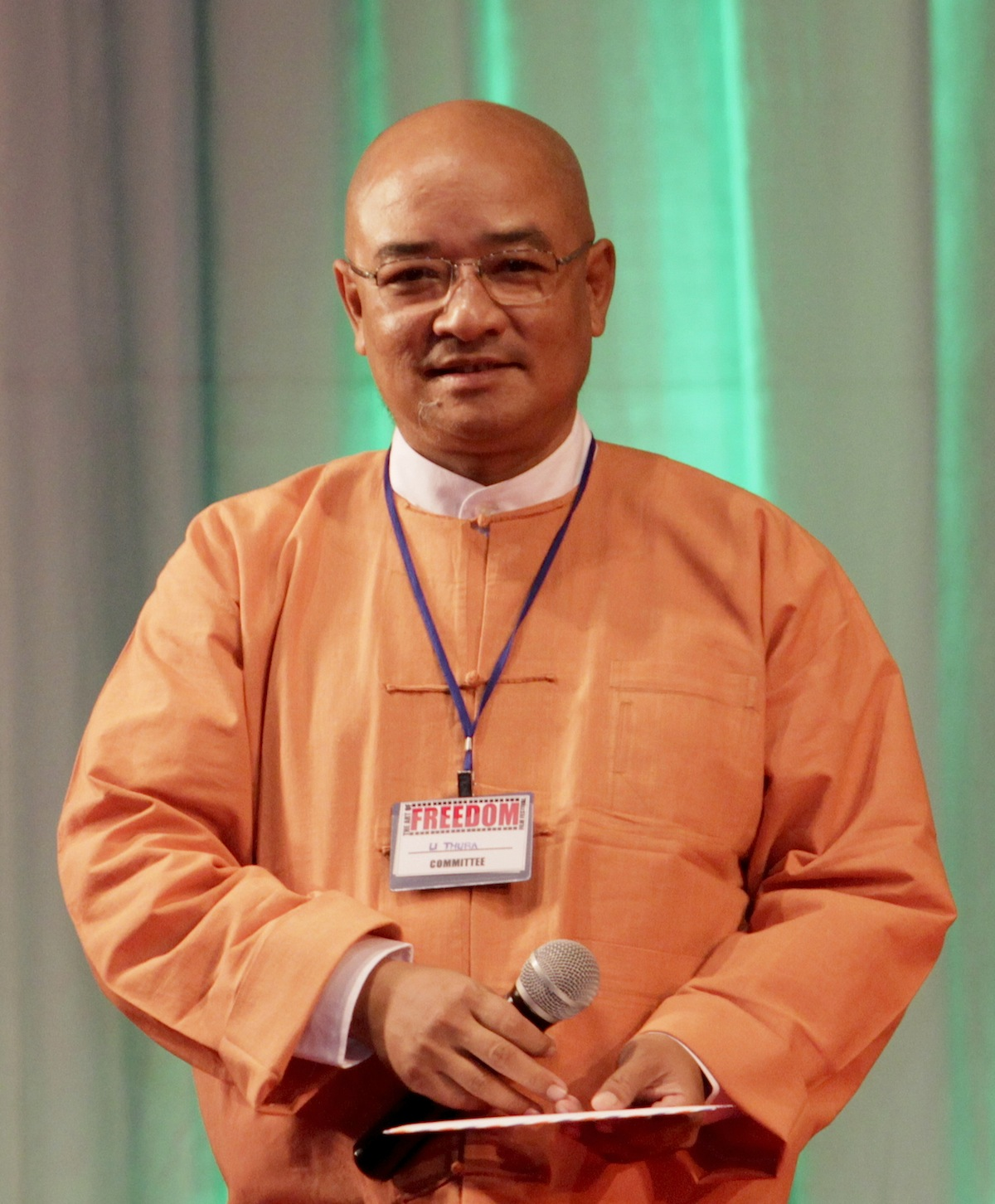
- Zarganar speaking at the Freedom Film Festival in Yangon, Myanmar on 1 January 2012.
- Born: Thura; 27 January 1961 (age 65); Rangoon, Burma
- Education: Yangon University of Dental Medicine; State High School No. 1 Dagon
- Occupations: Writer, director, actor, comedian, satirist
- Years active: 1981–present
- Spouse: Lwin Mar Oo
- Children: Myat Kaung, Nge Oo Mon
- Parent(s): Aung Thein (Nan Nyunt Swe) and Hla Kyi (Kyi Oo)
- Website: Official Facebook account (currently unavailable)

Maung Thura "Zarganar" (also called Zaganar, Burmese: ဇာဂနာ; also Zargana, pronounced [zàɡənà]); born 27 January 1961) is a popular Burmese comedian, film actor, and director as well as a fierce critic and often political prisoner of the Burmese military government. Known for his wicked puns against the ruling military junta, Zarganar, whose name translates to "tweezers", is widely considered to be the most popular comedian and satirist in Myanmar.

In September 2006, Zarganar was banned indefinitely from performing publicly or participating in any kind of entertainment related work. He was arrested on 4 June 2008 for speaking to foreign media about the situation of millions of people left homeless after the extremely destructive Cyclone Nargis devastated the Irrawaddy Delta. In November 2008, he was sentenced to 59 years in prison, convicted of "public order offenses", under four sections of the criminal code—17/2, 32 (b), 295 (a) and 505 (b), much more than the anticipated maximum of two years. On 16 February 2009, following the appeals by the family, Yangon Divisional Court reduced the prison sentence by "up to 24 years", bringing the sentence down to 35 years. In December 2008, Zarganar was sent to Myitkyina Prison in Kachin State in the country's far north, from which he was freed on 11 October 2011 in a mass amnesty of political prisoners.

Zarganar was awarded the Lillian Hellman and Dashiell Hammett Award, given by the Fund for Free Expression, a committee organized by the New-York-based Human Rights Watch. In October 2008, Zarganar was awarded One Humanity Award by PEN Canada of which he is an honorary member.

== Early life ==
Zarganar was born Thura (သူရ, [θùɹa̰], also [θùja̰]) in Yangon to a political and intellectual family of well-known writers Hla Kyi (who went by the pen name of Yuwaddy Kyi Oo) and Aung Thein (pen name: Nan Nyunt Swe). Thura is of Mon-Bamar descent. Thura was the youngest of three sons, brother of Wunna and Teza. The young Thura accompanied his parents on speaking tours where he used to entertain people by giving talks and doing imitations, and earned himself the nickname "Mimic".

Thura graduated from Yangon's elite State High School No. 1 Dagon in 1977 and received a degree in dental surgery from Rangoon Institute of Dental Medicine in 1985. While in dentistry school, he worked as a volunteer literacy teacher in Chin State and wrote about his experiences in a book, published by the Sape Beikman, the country's official literary publishing house.

== Career ==
Thura first found success while still in college, performing amateur stage comedy shows at Yangon's universities under his stage name Zarganar (tweezers). He banded together with students from various colleges and institutes and formed a dance-troupe called Mya Kyun Tha. Later, he formed a drama group called Moe Nat Thuza which performed at student gatherings. Zarganar soon became a household name when his troupe began appearing on Burmese television in broadcasts of anyeint (a type of traditional Burmese theater) shows.

After completing his dentistry studies, he took to the stage full-time. In 1986, he formed the Mya Ponnama Anyeint troupe whose shows frequently appeared on television. He quickly became known for his expert ability to concoct double entendres; his willingness to use them in farcical routines that highlighted the failures of the government delighted millions of awe-struck audiences.

That all changed in 1988, when Zarganar was arrested for participating in the nationwide 8888 uprising. He would be in and out of prison for the next 5–6 years. After his release from prison in 1994, Zarganar was prohibited from performing on stage but allowed to participate in video productions, working as producer, director, scriptwriter and actor. But his work was closely scrutinized by the censors and military intelligence in a cat-and-mouse game in which Zarganar and his audiences took delight in sidestepping the authorities.

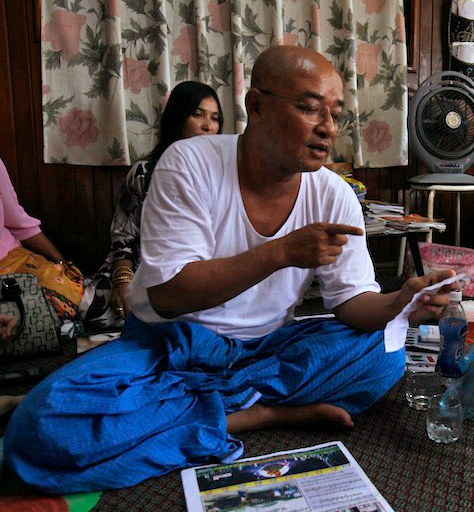
Zaganar reads a letter that he wrote in prison for his friends, at his home after he was released by government's amnesty, Yangon, Myanmar 13 October 2011.

In 1997, Zarganar soon ran afoul with the authorities for his movie Lun, and was promptly banned for another three years from the show business. He was allowed to do films in 2000 (but still no comedy shows or stage theater). Since May 2006, Zarganar has again been banned from the show business indefinitely, for giving an interview to the BBC.

== Artistic contributions ==
Zarganar's contributions to the revival of popularity of anyeint (also spelled anyein) among the younger generations of Burmese cannot be overstated. Anyeint shows are a form of traditional theater combining dance, music and comedy that have come to play a central role in Burmese society by being performed at a wide range of secular and religious events, from weddings to pagoda festivals. The shows are traditionally led by one or more female performers who dance and sing playful songs, and a troupe of comedians (usually 4 or 5) provide comic relief in-between the song-and-dance routines of the female performers. Before Zarganar came along, the popularity of anyeint shows had long been in decline (especially in urban areas).

Zarganar helped to revitalize the art by turning the format upside-down. By using humor to push the envelope against government censors, his anyeint shows generated immense interest among Burmese of all backgrounds, and in the process attracted new generations of fans to anyeint shows. Zarganar did not invent the art of using puns and double entendres, which had long been part of traditional Burmese humor but in many ways he perfected it in the Burmese language. The tonal monosyllabic Burmese language with many homophones seemed particularly suited for double talk. People were drawn to his vaudevillian routines filled with seemingly innocent silly banter among comedians not only because they were bitingly funny but also because they cleverly highlighted the failures of the government.

By the mid-1980s, comedians has become a major attraction in anyeint performances, often drawing audiences as much as, or more than, the features singers and dancers. While anyeint productions continued to be formally led by female performers, comedians increasingly played a prominent role, combining comedy with social and political commentary. Some of the most popular performers, including Thee-Lay-Thee, became known for incorporating satire of government and public affairs into their acts.

== Political activities and social work ==
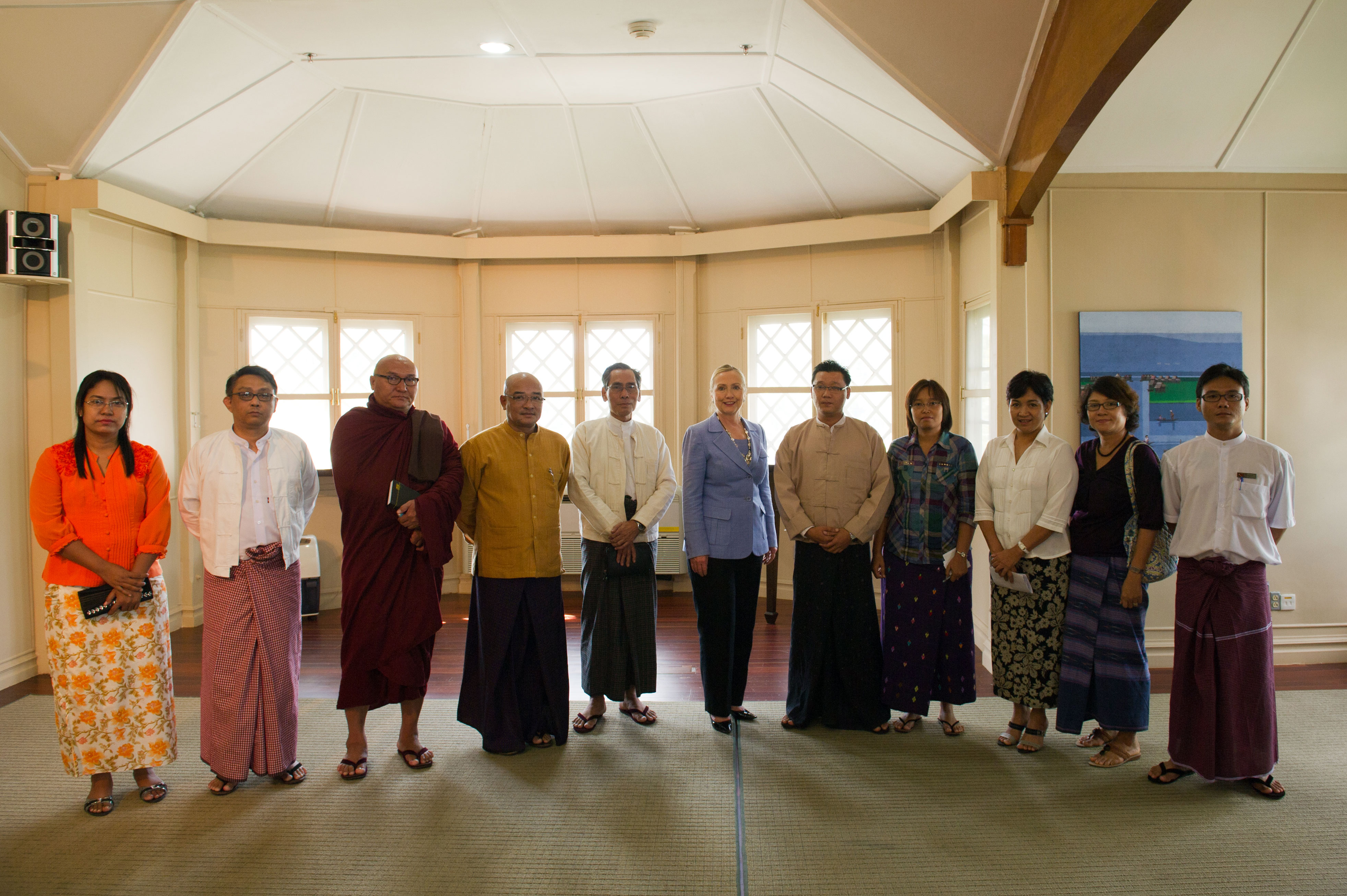
In December 2011, US Secretary of State Hillary Clinton met with Zarganar, along with other civil society representatives. (Clicking on a person's face will take you to an article about the person.)

During the 8888 Uprising in 1988, Zarganar was arrested for being an "instigator" and sent to the notorious Insein Prison for a year. After his release he was arrested again during the 1990 elections for giving political speeches and sentenced to another four years in prison. (His father, also a political activist, at one point gave a speech at the home of Aung San Suu Kyi, leading to a ban by the state censors. His mother Kyi Oo was also elected as an independent candidate.) In 1991, the Fund for Free Expression, part of the Human Rights Watch organization, awarded him a Lillian Hellman and Dashiell Hammett Grant.

Soon after Cyclone Nargis devastated vast swaths of the Irrawaddy Delta in early May 2008, Zarganar organized a group of an estimated 400 Burmese involved in the entertainment industry to provide volunteer disaster relief aid in the cyclone-damaged areas. He divided the volunteers into groups of helpers, who took aid to 42 villages, some of which had until then received no help at all after the cyclone.

In January 2012, the British Foreign Secretary William Hague is due to meet Zarganar to discuss political reform as part of the first visit by a British Foreign Secretary to Burma in over fifty years.

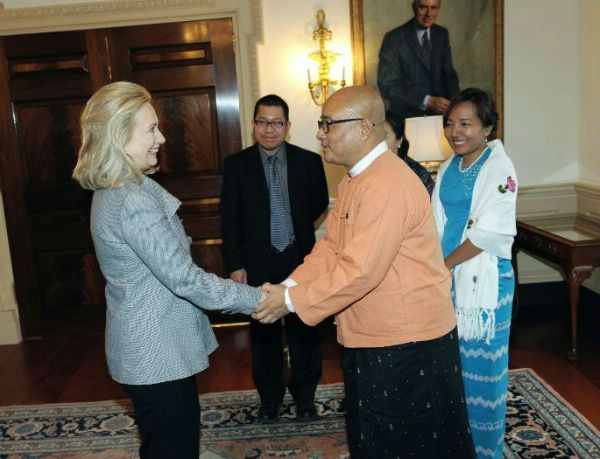
Zarganar's 2012 visit to the United States to meet with Hillary Clinton.

In February 2012, Zarganar travelled to Washington, D.C., to meet US Secretary of State Hillary Clinton and discuss the ongoing issue of political prisoners, women’s rights, and the situation of Myanmar’s ethnic minorities with the country’s senior officials.

On 6 April 2021, in the aftermath of the 2021 Myanmar coup d'état, he was arrested at his home in Yangon. Since the coup on 1 February, he had not carried out any significant political activities, and the reason for his arrest is unknown. On 18 October 2021, he was conditionally released.

== List of conflicts with the government ==
- February 2006: The government bans a movie that Zarganar directed, Run Out of Patience.
- May 2006: Zarganar is banned from performing in the country for his interview with the BBC regarding government regulations on the Thingyan water festival, and for making a television commercial suggesting Taiwanese independence.
- February 2007: A state-run newspaper (the New Light of Myanmar) accuses Zarganar of participating in "illegal" activities and inciting "public unrest and violence" after his speech at a debate at the American Center, a venue operated by the US embassy in Yangon.
- 26 September 2007: Zarganar is arrested at his home for his participation in the ongoing anti-government protests. During the preceding two days he had, with fellow Burmese celebrity Kyaw Thu, publicly delivered food and water to Buddhist monks preparing to protest. During the preceding weekend, he had urged the public to support the monks in radio interviews from outside the country.
- 4 June 2008: Special Branch police and other authorities take him from his home in connection with this work, along with a computer, VCDs and US$1000.
- 21 November 2008: Zarganar is sentenced by the Court to 45 years imprisonment for violations of the Electronics Act.
- 29 November 2008: Zarganar receives an additional 14 years under four sections of the criminal code—17/2, 32 (b), 295 (a) and 505 (b), bringing the total sentence to 59 years.
- 16 February 2009: Following the appeals, Yangon Divisional Court reduces the prison sentence by "up to 24 years", bringing the sentence down to 35 years.
- 11 (or 12) October 2011: Zarganar is released as part of a series of amnesties of political prisoners, along with labor activist Su Su Nway and 88 Generation Student Group activist Zaw Htet Ko Ko.
- 6 April - 18 October 2021: Zarganar is arrested citing anti-coup activity following crackdowns after 2021 Myanmar coup d'état, and released about six months later in amnesty order

== Awards and recognition ==
In 2008, Zarganar was awarded the Freedom to Create Prize for Imprisoned Artists. Amnesty International named him a prisoner of conscience and called for his immediate release. In 2009, he was awarded the inaugural PEN/Pinter Prize as an International writer of courage. In May 2011, Zarganar was awarded Honorary Life Membership in Equity, the UK performers' union, in recognition of his struggle for artistic freedom in Burma.

Zarganar has been featured in This Prison Where I Live, a documentary film by British filmmaker Rex Bloomstein and German comedian Michael Mittermeier, who had secretly traveled to Burma to make the film.

In 2009, Zarganar was awarded the inaugural PEN Pinter Prize, established in memory of Harold Pinter. Zarganar shared the award with British poet Tony Harrison.

On 27 March 2012, Zarganar received the Prince Claus Fund Award, handed over by Dutch ambassador Joan Boers during a historic Aneyint event in the People's Square in Yangon.

== Filmography ==
=== Films ===
Between 1985 and 1988, Zarganar starred in four films and eight video movies as the lead actor. He took on supporting actor roles in his movies since 2001. He also tried his hand at directing. In 2004, with the aid of local non-governmental organisations, Zarganar directed three short videos and a film for the purpose of raising awareness of HIV and AIDS in the country.

Year	Film	Notes
1985	Mintha Daw Mintha	
1985	Lu Naut	With May Win Maung
1986	Sein-Lai-Lay Kya Tha-La Lo	
1986	A-Sa-Ga-Daw Mohn De Hso	
2001	Datkhe	Supporting actor
2001	Ponna Ba Kun	With Kyaw Thu, Htet Htet Moe Oo
2002	La-Min-Go Sein-Khaw-Gya Thu-Mya	With Lu Min, Eaindra Kyaw Zin
2002	Yindwin Zaga	With Dwe, May Than Nu, Eaindra Kyaw Zin
2002	Chit-Pa-Naw Maung-Go	
2002	Padauk Pinlè	With Yar Zar Nay Win, Htun Eaindra Bo, Zaw One
2003	Karyan A-Lwè	With Dwe, Soe Myat Thuzar, Nandar Hlaing
2003	Pyauk Pyauk Myauk Myauk	
2003	Pawpaw Papa Pyon	With Kyaw Ye Aung, Nandar Hlaing, Eaindra Kyaw Zin, May Thinzar Oo
2004	Style	With Lwin Moe, Yar Zar Nay Win, Eaindra Kyaw Zin, Soe Myat Nandar, Pyay Ti Oo
2004	Ba A-Yay-Kyi Zohn-Lè	With Kyaw Thu, Lu Min, Su Pan Htwar
2004	Balu (Ogre)	
2004	Kyepwint Lay-Mya	With Yan Aung, May Than Nu, Pann Phyu
2004	Ngo-Ah-Htet Yi-Ah-Than	With Lwin Moe, Minn Hein, Sharr Nyo, Eaindra Kyaw Zin, May Thinzar Oo
2005	Mingalaba	With Nay Toe, Sai Sai Kham Leng, Myo Sandy Kyaw
2005	Yadana	With Kyaw Thu, Htun Aeindra Bo
2005	Model A-Chit-Mya	With Lwin Moe, Yan Aung, Tint Tint Tun, Eindra Kyaw Zin, May Thinzar Oo
2010	This Prison Where I Live	British Documentary
2017	Auto Ba-Yin	With Kyaw Kyaw Bo, Ei Chaw Po

=== Videos ===
Direct-to-video productions on VCD intended strictly for the home market and never screened in theaters include:

- Da Myo Gyi Lè Phyit Tat Ba Dè
- Modern Nay A Phay
- Daga Khaut Than Mya
- Shar-Shay Gya Thu Mya
- Ta Wa-Wa Ta Ha-Ha
- May-Kyan-Yit-Thaw Zatlan Da Bot
- Paut Paut Myaut Myaut
- Pyi Gyi Mandaing Mya Gyi (Part II)
- Sanda Pinle
- Bar Bar Bar Mha Ma Thi Bu (Part I)
- Aye-Say Ba
- Chit Chit Nè Thungegyin Hna Yauk
- Zar Kanar
- Lu Kè
- A-Thet Ta-Ya A-Na Ma Shi
