= Hlae Sar =

- film poster
- Burmese: လှည့်စား
- Directed by: Thein Maung (Phoenix)
- Written by: Ni Ko Ye
- Produced by: Phoenix Film Production
- Starring: Kyaw Ye Aung; Dwe; Thar Nyi; Khine Thin Kyi; Moe Di; Khin Hlaing; Chit Phwel; Min Min; Sonny; Moe Kyaw; Kyu Kyu Thin; Aye Thida; San San Win; U Sein Yoe; Pyaih Pyu Khaing; Chit Sa Yar
- Cinematography: Mg Myat Swe
- Release date: July 14, 2006
- Country: Myanmar
- Language: Burmese

Hlae Sar (Burmese: လှည့်စား; translated Deceive or Tricky) is a 2006 Burmese comedy drama film directed by Thein Maung (Phoenix), who is mainly involved in directing TV commercials.

== Cast ==
- Kyaw Ye Aung as Min Htet
- Dwe as Zaw Latt
- Thar Nyi
- Khine Thin Kyi as Khine Mya Zin
- Moe Di
- Khin Hlaing
- Chit Phwel
- Min Min
- Sonny (Burmese comedian)
- Moe Kyaw
- Kyu Kyu Thin
- Aye Thida
- San San Win
- Sein Yoe
- Pyae Phu Khaing
- Chit Sa Yar

== International release ==
On July 14, 2006, the comedy film Hlae Sar was released in Yangon.
