= Eaindra Kyaw Zin =

Burmese actress and model

- အိန္ဒြာကျော်ဇင်
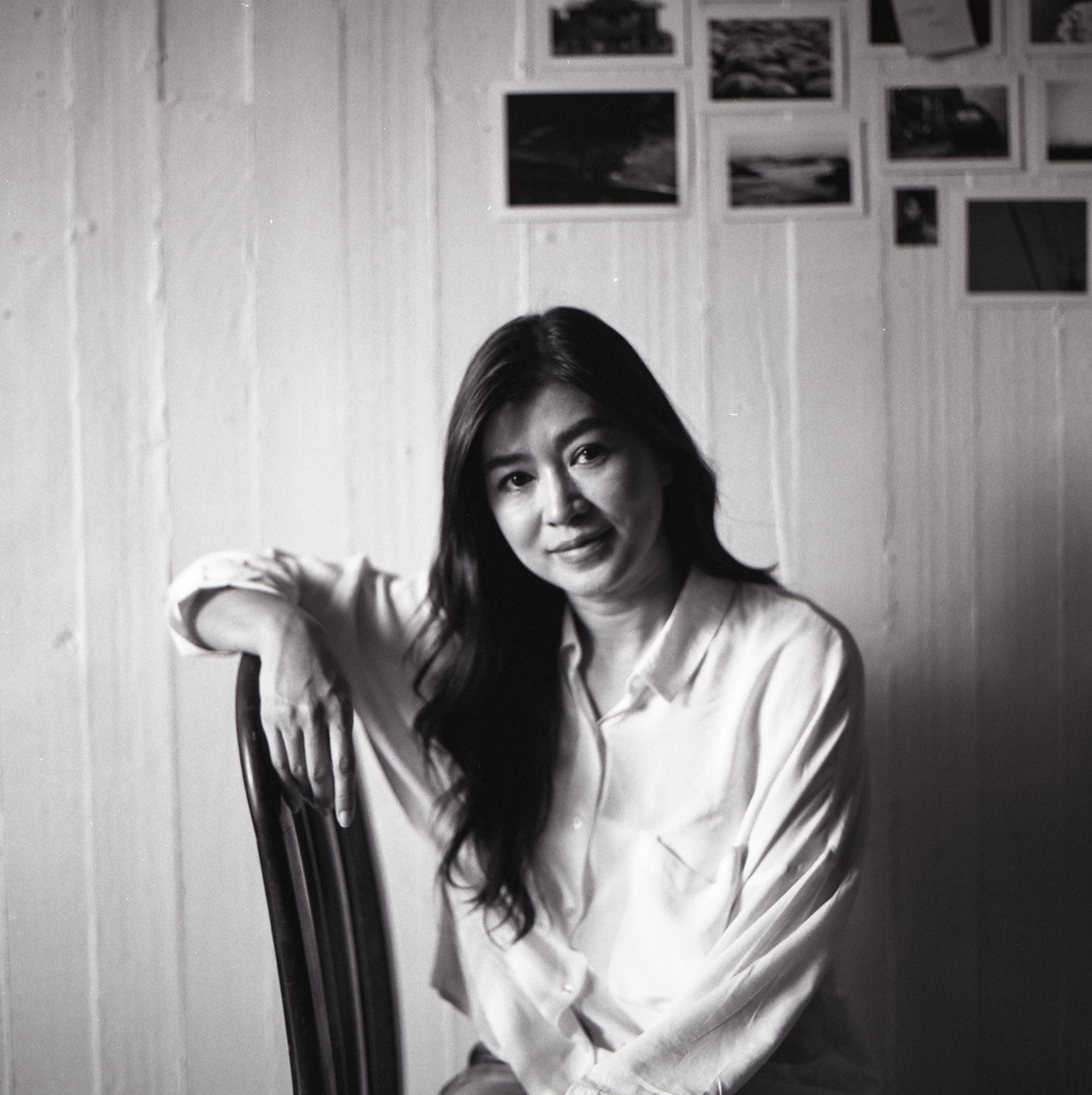
- Eaindra Kyaw Zin in 2020
- Born: Eaindra Kyaw Zin; 24 April 1977 (age 49); Rangoon, Burma
- Other name: Eu Wae – အူဝဲ
- Education: BSc (Chemistry)
- Occupations: Actress, model, producer, businesswoman
- Years active: 1996–present
- Height: 160 cm (5 ft 3 in)
- Title: Miss Christmas 1996
- Spouse: Pyay Ti Oo (m. 2011)
- Children: Pyay Thudra, Pyay Diya
- Awards: Myanmar Academy Award for Best Actress (2004, 2017, 2019)

Eaindra Kyaw Zin (Burmese: အိန္ဒြာကျော်ဇင်, pronounced [ʔèiɴdɹà tɕɔ̀ zɪ̀ɴ]; born 24 April 1977) is a three-time Myanmar Academy Award-winning Burmese actress and model. She is one of Myanmar's highest-paid actresses and an amateur painter. Now, being above 40, she still remains a popular actress in Myanmar.

== Early life ==
Eaindra Kyaw Zin was born to a well-to-do family in Yangon, the youngest child of Mya Thida and Kyaw Zin. She is a granddaughter of Bo Zeya, one of the Thirty Comrades who founded the modern Burmese Army, a niece of Dagon Taya, a writer, and a first cousin of singer Hayma Ne Win and singer and film star Yaza Ne Win. Kyaw Zin graduated from Yangon's Dagon 1 High School. She holds a BSc degree in chemistry.

== Career ==
In an interview with The Myanmar Times, Kyaw Zin admitted that film was not her initial choice of a career. Rather, she envisioned herself as an independent artist or a doctor but had to reevaluate her options after getting sub-par grades in school. Her first foray into the entertainment industry came by way of a local beauty contest. She won the Miss Kokkine contest in 1996, and then went on to win Miss Christmas the same year. Following 1996, she began to act in TV series such as Loving Editor (Chit Thaw Editor) and Ah Hnine Mae. She became popular in the Ah Hnine Mae TV series with a character called Po Tay. For the next two years she appeared in magazines and modeling shows. In 2000, she scored her big break as an actress in the film Pyaw Lai Kya Ya Aung (Let's Have Great Fun) as the lead actress. She was nominated as best lead actress at Tha-Mee-Shin Film for 2000 Academy.

Ironically, her film career in the early 2000s was handicapped by the top leading man of that day, Yaza Ne Win, her first cousin. In 2003, she spoke to Chiangmai-based The Irrawaddy magazine that "I have limited opportunities to act in current popular movies. In the movies, I can only perform sibling roles with my first cousin and we can not shoot love scenes." As it is leading men who score big at the box office in Burma, being cast aside by male superstars is an actress's best chance at fame.

Eaindra Kyaw Zin won the 2004 Myanmar Academy Award, playing a villain role in the movie, Flirtatious Sky (မျက်နှာများတဲ့ကောင်းကင်). She continues to act in films and model for commercials. Eaindra Kyaw Zin also won the 2017 Myanmar Academy Award, playing in the main role in the movie, Knife in the Heart ( Yin-Bat-Htae-Ka-Dar). Although she is over 40, she is still a top model and actress in an industry full of young starlets. She is also vice-CEO of Pyay Ti Oo Education Foundation and Chair-Person of Thudra Film Production and The Bridge Myanmar.

== Political views and activities ==
In December 2003, the Burmese actress was accused by The Irrawaddy for displaying "conspicuous patriotism". When the Thai film Bang Rajan—which featured scenes of one of Burma's 18th century invasions of the Thai kingdom—was screened at a Pan-Asian film festival in France in early 2001, Kyaw Zin stormed out of the theater before the film's end. Its director, Thanit Jitnukul, who took home the festival's Best Director award, recounted meeting Kyaw Zin that day. "She was very friendly at first," Thanit said. "Then she asked me about my movie. I told her its name, and she refused to talk to me again."

Following the 2021 Myanmar coup d'état, she participated in the anti-coup movement both in person at rallies and through social media. Denouncing the military coup, she took part in protests, starting in February. She joined the "We Want Justice" three-finger salute movement. The movement was launched on social media, and many celebrities have joined the movement.

On 2 April 2021, warrants for her arrest were issued under Section 505 (a) of the Myanmar Penal Code by the State Administration Council for speaking out against the military coup. Along with several other celebrities, she was charged with calling for participation in the Civil Disobedience Movement (CDM) and damaging the state's ability to govern, with supporting the Committee Representing Pyidaungsu Hluttaw, and with generally inciting the people to disturb the peace and stability of the nation.

On 9 April 2021, Eaindra Kyaw Zin and her husband Pyay Ti Oo, were arrested at their home. After almost 11 months, they were released on 2 March 2022.

== Personal life ==
She married actor Pyay Ti Oo on 1 January 2011. They have two children.

== Social work ==
Eaindra Kyaw Zin is socially involved with the community and various Burmese charities and is considered by her peers to be a good role model for young women in the country.

== Filmography ==
Lists of films
Year	Film	Director	Co-Stars	Notes
1998	KyaNaw KyaMa Doh Thi		Yi Wai Yan, Htun Eaindra Bo, Myo Thanda Htun, Ah Yei	
1999	A Phyu Yaung AhTah		Min Maw Kun, Hla Inzale Tint, Min Thu	
2000	Thamee Shin	Khin Maung Oo & Soe Thein Htut	Yan Aung, Dwe, Wyne, Sai Bo Bo, Khin Than Nu, Cho Pyone, Myo Thanda Tun, Soe Moe Kyi, Nwae Nwae San	Nominated-Best Actress Award
2000	Ma Mone Lay Nae Ngapali	Zin Yaw Maung Maung	Yan Aung, Dwe, Moe Di, May Than Nu, Nwae Nwae San	
2001	Pyin Sa Let Yin Khun	Malikha Soe Htike Aung	Dwe, Min Oo, Htet Htet Moe Oo, Hla Eain Za Li Tint	
2001	Eain Met Yar Thi	Mee Pwar	Dwe, Moht Moht Myint Aung, Nay Toe, Aung Lwin	
2002	A Chit The Lay Pyay	Ko Aung Min Thein	Dwe, Phyo Ngwe Soe, Sai Bo Bo, Kutho, Smile, Nawarat	Nominated-Best Actress Award
2002	Yin Dwin Zaga	Khin Maung Oo+Soe Thein Htut	Dwe, May Than Nu, Zaganar, Khu Thol, King Kaung	
2002	Min Nae Mha Chit Tat Pyi	Khin Maung Oo+Soe Thein Htut	Dwe, Nay Aung, Thu Maung, Wyne, Kutho, Phoe Phyu, Nga Pyaw Kyaw, Zu Zu Maung	
2002	Yin Wat Pann	Mite Ti	Dwe, Lu Min, Tun Tun Win	Nominated-Best Actress Award
2003	La Min Ko Sein Khaw Kya Thu Mya	Maung Tin Oo	Lu Min, Myint Myint Khaing	
2003	Nay Ka Mway Tae La	Maung Tin Oo	Kyaw Hein, Min Maw Kun, Tint Tint Tun	
2003	Thoo Mwae Hta Thissa	Wai Hmai Nyo	Nyunt Win, Thiha Tin Soe, Lu Min, Sithu Tin Soe, May Than Nu, Htun Eaindra Bo, Nawarat, Nwae Nwae Mu, San San Aye	
2003	Chit Chin Yin Khon Yawng Kyi Swar Phyit	Lwin Min	Dwe, Tint Tint Tun	
2004	Nauk Ma Kya Kyay	Maung Myo Min (Yin Twin Phyit)	Dwe, Nanda, Ah-Yaing, Aung Lwin, Khine Thin Kyi	
2004	Yin Khon Than A Yin Hni Sone	Naung Tun Lwin+Nyi Nyi Tun Lwin	Dwe, Phyo Ngwe Soe, Byite, Kyaw Htoo, Htin Paw, Wyne, Zaw Zaw Aung, Aye Wit Yi Thaung, Hnin Wit Yi Thaung, Gone Pon Lay	
2004	Eain Met Nat Thamee	Khin Maung Oo+Soe Thein Htut	Dwe, Thu Htoo San, Htun Eaindra Bo, Pearl Win	
2004	Myet Nhar Myar Tae Kaung Kin	Maung Myo Min (Yin Twin Phit)	Yan Aung, Lwin Moe, Tint Tint Tun	Won-Best Actress Award
2004	Style	Mite Ti	Lwin Moe, Yar Zar Ne Win, Zarganar, Soe Myat Nandar, May Thinza Oo, Pyay Ti Oo	
2005	Chit Chin Phwat Met Tar	Khin Maung Oo+Soe Thein Htut	Dwe, Phoe Kyaw, Min Thu, Min Htet Kyaw Zin, Myint Naing, Tint Tint Tun, Myat Kay Thi Aung, Su Pan Htwar, Khine Hnin Wai	Nominated-Best Actress Award
2005	Ah Chit Yae Nel Sat Ah Hmone Tae Myo Yoe	Naung Tun Lwin+Nyi Nyi Tun Lwin	Kyaw Ye Aung, Dwe, Min Hein, Wyne, Ah-Yaing, Nawarat	
2005	Kyo Nah Sah	Khin Maung Oo+Soe Thein Htut	Dwe, Tint Tint Tun, Myint Myint Khin, Ku Thol, Nyo Min Lwin	
2005	Kaba Sone Hti	Khin Maung Oo+Soe Thein Htut	Tun Tun, Wyne Su Khaing Thein	
2005	Modern A Chit Myar	Nyunt Myanmar Nyi Nyi Aung	Lwin Moe, Yan Aung, Zarganar, Tint Tint Tun, May Thinzar Oo	
2006	Ton Ton Le Chit	Maung Nanda	Yan Aung, Dwe, Sharr Nyo, Soe Myat Nandar, Hla Izzali Tint, Khine Hnin Wai	
2006	Maik-ti Lay Mya	Mite Ti	Lwin Moe, Lu Min, Yaza Ne Win	Nominated-Best Actress Award
2007	Wingaba Achit Ne Thu Ei Chit Koko Chit	Thein Han (Phoenix)	Min Mawkun, Nay Toe, Be Lu Wa, Thinza Wint Kyaw	
2007	Moe-Paw Khon-Tet Ka Laik Chin Ba De	Nyunt Myanmar Nyi Nyi Aung	Nay Toe, Htun Htun, Ye Lay, Nay Aung, Myat Kaythi Aung, May Thinzar Oo	
2007	Di Kaung Be Thu Dohn	Nyi Nyi Tun Lwin	Nay Toe, Moe Di, Moss, Met Tar, Khin Soe Paing	
2008	Shock Shi Te A Chit Mya	Ko Zaw (Aryon Oo)	Ye Aung, Khant Sithu, Pyay Ti Oo, Soe Myat Thuzar, Moe Hay Ko	
2008	Myint Mo Htet Ka Tharaphu	Thein Han (Phoenix)	Nay Toe, Tun Tun, Zin Wyne, Moh Moh Myint Aung	
2009	Mommy Shein	Nyi Nyi Tun Lwin	Yan Aung, Nay Toe, Moe Di, Moss, Thinza Wint Kyaw, Nan Su Yati Soe	
2009	Ahteik Ye Ahyeik (Shadow of the Past)	Zin Yaw Maung Maung	Aung Thura, Zin Myo, Khine Hnin Wai	Nominated-Best Actress Award
2009	Hot Shot 2		Thu Htoo San, Moe Aung Yin, Moh Moh Myint Aung, May Than Nu, Melody	
2009	Gyogya Taung-Pan Khat Than	Zin Yaw Maung Maung	Nay Toe, Kyaw Kyaw Bo, Wyne Su Khine Thein, Moe Yu San	Nominated-Best Actress Award
2010	Nat Phat Tae Sone Twal Myar	Ko Zaw (Aryon Oo)	Ye Aung, Pyay Ti Oo, Nyi Nanda, Soe Myat Thuzar, Thet Mon Myint	
2010	Heart Hti Tal	Nyunt Myanmar Nyi Nyi Aung	Yan Aung, Ye Aung, Thu Htoo San, Moe Aung Yin, Moh Moh Myint Aung, Soe Myat Thuzar, Thin Zar Wint Kyaw	
2010	Achit Larr Lar Htar	Nyi Nyi Tun Lwin	Min Maw Kun, Khant Si Thu, Moe Aung Yin, Kyaw Kyaw Bo, Khine Thin Kyi, Melody, Soe Pyae Thazin	
2011	Change	Thein Han (Phoenix)	Nay Toe, Kyaw Kyaw Bo	
2011	Falan Falan Phyit Dae Achit	Nyi Nyi Tun Lwin	Yan Aung, Nay Toe, Moh Moh Myint Aung, May Thinzar Oo, Chit Snow Oo	
2012	May Khin Kanyar	Ko Zaw (Ar Yone Oo)	Yan Aung, Ye Aung, Khant Si Thu, Pyay Ti Oo, Kyaw Kyaw Bo, Soe Myat Thuzar, Thinzar Wint Kyaw, Wutt Hmone Shwe Yi	
2012	Thwar Lu Soe Dar Myo Taw Tat Tal	Nyi Nyi Htun Lwin	Kyaw Ye Aung, Pyay Ti Oo, Nay Min, Soe Myat Thuzar, Pearl Win	
2013	Kyal-Sin Maw-Gun (Star Record)	Pa Gyi Soe Moe	Ye Aung, Lu Min, Wai Lu Kyaw, Nay Toe, Tun Tun, Soe Myat Thuzar, Tint Tint Tun, Pan Phyu, Thet Mon Myint	Nominated-Best Supporting Actress Award
2013	White Castle	Ko Zaw (Ar Yone Oo)	Nay Toe, Pyay Ti Oo, Kaung Pyae, Cho Pyone, Thandar Bo, Yoon Yoon	Nominated-Best Actress Award
2014	Ko Tint Toh Super Yat Kwat	Kyaw Zaw Lin	Ah Yine, Yan Aung, Ye Aung, Lu Min, Min Maw Kun, Pyay Ti Oo, Nay Toe, Myint Myat, Aung Ye Lin, Moe Pyae Pyae Maung, Soe Myat Thuzar, Thet Mon Myint, Wutt Hmone Shwe Yi, Phway Phway, Sandi Myint Lwin	special appearance
2015	Chit San Eain 2028	Hein Soe	Lu Min, Min Maw Kun, Pyay Ti Oo, Nay Toe, Tun Tun, Myint Myat, Nay Min, Htun Eaindra Bo, Moe Hay Ko, Chit Thu Wai, Soe Pyae Thazin, Thinzar Wint Kyaw, Wutt Hmone Shwe Yi	
2015	Maunt Eain Thu	Thi Dar Linn (Laurel)	Lu Min, Tun Tun Win, Hla Yin Kyay, Yoon Yoon	Nominated-Best Actress Award
2016	Hnin Si Pan Tu (Rose Wearer)	Hein Soe	Naung Naung, Zin Wyne, Ye Aung, Zaw Oo, May Than Nu	
2017	Yin Bat Htae Ka Dar	Wyne (Own Creator)	Pyay Ti Oo, Nay San, Htun Eaindra Bo, Myat Kay Thi Aung, May Ka Byar, Khin Moh Moh Aye, Nwae Nwae San	Won-Best Actress Award
2018	Kyi Lay Kyi	Pyay Thein Thi Ha	Lu Min, Khant Si Thu, Khin Hlaing, Khine Thin Kyi	
2018	Reflection	Lu Min	Htun Eaindra Bo, Wut Hmone Shwe Yee, Patricia	Post-Production
2018	Kyat Gu	Lu Min	Lu Min, Myint Myat, Htun Eaindra Bo	
2019	Hit Tine	Hein Soe	Sai Wanna Aung, James, Htoo Pyae Aung, May Than Nu, Mone, Phyo Pa Pa Htoo, Sao Yoon Waddy Oo	
2019	The Three Men, She Loves	Mg Myo Min (Yin Twin Phyit)	Yan Aung, Min Oo, Min Bhone Myat, Moht Moht Myint Aung, Emily Bo	
2019	Jin Party	Yazawin Ko	Yan Aung, Min Maw Kun, Yair Yint Aung, Htoo Aung, Bella, Yin Latt, Shwe Eain Si, Khin Hlaing, Ko Pouk, Joker, K Nyi	
2019	Frequency	Khant Mhan Htal	Htun Eaindra Bo, many new actors...	
2019	Yuu Aung Chit Mae Lu	Aung Zaw Lin	Nay Toe, Min Thar Ge, May Toe Khine	
2019	Nyit Toon	Lu Min	Lu Min, Pyay Ti Oo, Khine Thin Kyi, Htet Htet Htun	
2019	A Mhya A Mhya	Steel (Dwe Myittar)	Khant Si Thu, Lin Zarni Zaw	
2019	Yoma Paw Kya Tae Myet Yay	Ko Pauk	Myint Myat, Khin Hlaing, Aung Yay Chan, Khine Thin Kyi, May Myint Mo	
2019	Box No. 88	Win Lwin Htet	Nay Toe, Htun Htun	
2019	Tin String	Ar Kar	Phyo Ngwe Soe, Aung Ye Htwe, Shwe Eain Si	
2020	Lady Danger	Pwint Theingi Zaw	Khant Si Thu, Khar Ra, Htun Eaindra Bo, Paing Phyo Thu, Mone	

== Awards and nominations ==
=== Beauty pageants ===
Year	Recipient	Honour	Result
1996	Eaindra Kyaw Zin	Miss Kokkine	Won
1996	Eaindra Kyaw Zin	Miss Christmas	Won

=== Myanmar Academy Awards ===
Year	Nominated Work	Category	Result
1999	A Phyu Yaung Atta	Best Actress	Nominated
2000	Thamee Shin	Best Actress	Nominated
2001	Dream Season	Best Actress	Nominated
2002	A Chit Thi Lay Pyay	Best Actress	Nominated
2002	Yin Hwat Pan	Best Actress	Nominated
2003	Nay Ka Mway Tae La	Best Actress	Nominated
2004	Magic String	Best Actress	Nominated
2004	Myet Nhar Myar Tae Kaung Kin	Best Actress	Won
2005	Chit Chin Phwae Myittar	Best Actress	Nominated
2006	Mite Tee Lay Myar	Best Actress	Nominated
2007	Moe Paw Khong Thet Ka Late Chin Tay	Best Actress	Nominated
2008	Myint Moh Htet Ka Tha Ra Phu	Best Supporting Actress	Nominated
2009	Mommy Shein	Best Actress	Nominated
2009	Gyo Gyar Taung Pan Khat Than	Best Actress	Nominated
2009	Sea Crosses	Best Actress	Nominated
2009	A Tate Ei A Yate	Best Actress	Nominated
2013	White Castle	Best Actress	Nominated
2014	Kyae Sin Maw Kun (Epic Of Stars)	Best Supporting Actress	Nominated
2015	Maunt Eain Thu (My Missus)	Best Actress	Nominated
2016	Hnin Si Pan Thu	Best Actress	Nominated
2017	Yin Bat Htae Ka Dar	Best Actress	Won
2019	Hit Tine	Best Actress	Won

=== Other awards ===
Year	Category	Film	Award	Result
2001	Best Actress	A Chit The Lay Pyay	Asian Academy Awards	Nominated
2009	Best Actress	A Thet Ei A Yate	Asian Academy Awards	Nominated
2009	Best Actress	A Thet Ei A Yate	Golden Rooster Awards	Nominated
2021	Seymour Cassel Award For Best Performance	What Happened to the Wolf?	Oldenburg International Film Festival	Won
2011	The Most Fashionable Celebrity		People Magazine Award	Won
2011	The Most Popular Celebrity		People Magazine Award	Won
2012	The Best Dress-up Fashion Award		Shwe FM 3rd Anniversary	Won
2018	Best in Entertainment		Myanmar's Pride Award	Won
2019	Best of Beauty (Glamour) Award		L'Oréal Red Carpet Show	Won
