= Ma Mone Lay Nae Ngapali =

2000 Burmese Film

- VCD Released Poster
- Burmese: မမုန်းလေနဲ့ငပလီ
- Directed by: Sin Yaw Mg Mg
- Screenplay by: Nyein Min
- Starring: Yan Aung; Dwe; May Than Nu; Eaindra Kyaw Zin
- Cinematography: Ko Ko Htay
- Music by: Zaw Myo Htut
- Production company: Sin Yaw Film Production
- Release date: 2000
- Running time: 125 minutes
- Country: Myanmar
- Language: Burmese

Ma Mone Lay Nae Ngapali (Burmese: မမုန်းလေနဲ့ငပလီ) is a 2000 Burmese romantic comedy-drama film, directed by Sin Yaw Mg Mg starring Yan Aung, Dwe, May Than Nu and Eaindra Kyaw Zin.

== Cast ==
- Yan Aung as U Ko Ko Tin
- Dwe as Maung Maung
- May Than Nu as Wutyi
- Eaindra Kyaw Zin as Dr. Moon
- Moe Di as Uncle Htoo
- Nwet Nwet San as Daw Nit
- Hsu Pan Htwar as Ohn Mar
- Goon Pone as Kay Thi
