= Nan Nyunt Swe =

Burmese writer (1923–2010)

- Born: Aung Thein; 1923; Prome District, British Burma
- Died: 14 July 2010 (aged 86–87); Yangon, Myanmar
- Occupation: Writer
- Spouse: Hla Kyi
- Children: Thura; Teza; Wunna
- Writing career
- Pen name: Thukhamein

Nan Nyunt Swe (Burmese: နန်းညွန့်ဆွေ, IPA: [náɰ̃ ɲ̥ʊ̰ɰ̃ sʰwè]; 1923 – 14 July 2010), born Aung Thein, was a distinguished Burmese writer, writing over 1,200 poems and 800 articles throughout his sixty-year-long career, focusing primarily on music and classic literature. In 1955, he married fellow writer Hla Kyi, who had the pen name Yuwadi Kyi Oo. He died on 14 July 2010 of natural causes. He published four novels in his career: Myitta Tay Than Kabya Mya (1961), Sasoman Kabya Mya (1978), Anu Pyinna Aman (1980), and Pale Myeikson Kabya Mya (1995). His son Thura, better known by his stage name Zarganar, is a well-known comedian.
