= Eain Met Nat Thamee =

2004 Burmese Film

- Poster
- Burmese: အိပ်မက်နတ်သမီး
- Directed by: Khin Maung Oo; Soe Thein Htut
- Screenplay by: Khin Maung Oo; Soe Thein Htut
- Starring: Dwe; Htun Eaindra Bo; Eaindra Kyaw Zin
- Production company: Moe Kaung Kin Film Production
- Release date: 2004
- Running time: 144 minutes
- Country: Myanmar
- Language: Burmese

Eain Met Nat Thamee (Burmese: အိပ်မက်နတ်သမီး) is a 2004 Burmese drama film, directed by Khin Maung Oo and Soe Thein Htut starring Dwe, Htun Eaindra Bo and Eaindra Kyaw Zin.

== Cast ==
- Dwe as Di Par
- Htun Eaindra Bo as May Khattar
- Eaindra Kyaw Zin as Shin Thant Kyi
