= Eain Met Yar Thi =

2001 Burmese Film

- Poster
- Burmese: အိပ်မက်ရာသီ
- Directed by: Mee Pwar
- Screenplay by: Moe Moe Saw Win
- Based on: Eain Met Yar Thi by Nay Naw
- Starring: Dwe; Moht Moht Myint Aung; Eaindra Kyaw Zin
- Cinematography: Kyaw Nyunt
- Edited by: Maung Htun Naing (Taung Twin)
- Production company: Hay Man Oo Films
- Release date: 2001
- Running time: 144 minutes
- Country: Myanmar
- Language: Burmese

Eain Met Yar Thi (Burmese: အိပ်မက်ရာသီ) is a 2001 Burmese drama film, directed by Mee Pwar starring Dwe, Moht Moht Myint Aung and Eaindra Kyaw Zin.

== Cast ==
- Dwe as Thurikza
- Moht Moht Myint Aung as Ingyin Nway
- Eaindra Kyaw Zin as Ngwe Hnin Phyu
- Aung Lwin as father of Thurikza
- Saw Naing as U Saw Say Wah
- Kin Kaung as Saw Thein Win
- Aung Zaw as Thuria
- Gandawin as May Thin Phyu
- Ye Mon as Ko Thet
- Nay Toe (Cameo)
