= Hna Yauk Ta Eain Met =

2000 Burmese Film

- Film Poster
- Burmese: နှစ်ယောက်တစ်အိပ်မက်
- Directed by: Naung Htun Lwin; Nyi Nyi Htun Lwin
- Screenplay by: Ko Kyaw Zaw (Myet Thwe)
- Story by: Steel
- Produced by: Ko Myat Soe Ye Kyaw Thu
- Starring: Dwe; Htet Htet Moe Oo
- Cinematography: Kyaw Thu Soe
- Edited by: Myo Myat Thu (Kyaung Kabar)
- Production company: Kyaung Kabar Film Production
- Release date: 2000
- Running time: 144 minutes
- Country: Myanmar
- Language: Burmese

Hna Yauk Ta Eain Met (Burmese: နှစ်ယောက်တစ်အိပ်မက်; lit. "Two people, One dream") is a 2000 Burmese drama film, directed by Naung Htun Lwin and Nyi Nyi Htun Lwin starring Dwe, Htet Htet Moe Oo and Kyi Lae Lae Oo.

== Cast ==
- Dwe as Myint Mo
- Htet Htet Moe Oo as Wutt Hmone
- Min Khit as Aung Latt
- Wyne as Aung Myo Zin
- Kyi Lae Lae Oo as Mi Mi Zin
- Moe Pwint as Moe Pwint
- A Yine as Khin Maung Naung
- Kyaw Htoo as Kyaw Htoo
- Ayeyar as Ayeyar
- Chit Sayar as Chit Sayar
- Myint Naing as U Myint Naing
- Saw Naing as U Maung Maung Soe
- Jolly Swe as Ba Gyi Nyunt
