= Dar Bae Naw =

- poster
- Burmese: ဒါပဲနော်
- Directed by: Maung Maung Oo (Snow White)
- Starring: Dwe; Nine Nine; Nandar Hlaing; Kyi Lae Lae Oo
- Distributed by: Snow White Film Production
- Release date: February 28, 2003
- Country: Myanmar
- Language: Burmese

Dar Bae Naw (Burmese: ဒါပဲနော်) is a 2003 Burmese comedy drama film starring Dwe, Nine Nine, Nandar Hlaing and Kyi Lae Lae Oo.

== Cast ==
- Dwe
- Nine Nine
- Nandar Hlaing
- Kyi Lae Lae Oo
- Cho Pyone
- Nwae Nwae San
- Kutho
- Kyaw Htoo
- U Maung Maung Myint
- Win Naing (Art)
- Yan Paing Soe
- U Yè Maung
- Tin Tin Hla
- Aye Aye Khaing
- Daw Ei Ei Soe

== Plot ==
Kyaw Zin Thant, Htoo Ye and Lin Win have been friends since childhood and work at the same company. Kyaw and Htoo are both engaged to their girlfriends but Lin is still playing the field.

Kyaw always teases Hoo for letting his fiancée boss him around and Lin for chasing women. Kyaw boasts to his friends that after marrying his own fiancée, Thet Mon Myint, he will change her into his ideal woman and not give in to her. Unknown to him, Thet has the same ideas about him, so neither of them shows their true self to the other during dating. Htoo has to postpone his wedding because his fiancée's father is ill.

After marriage, Kyaw realizes he can't change Thet. Thet usually gets her way using beguiling enticements, tantrums, or just wearing Kyaw down. Thet is insanely jealous and forbids Kyaw to let any women into his office at work except for an older single woman. However Kyaw loves Thet and becomes her hen-pecked husband. He does not let his two friends know this and he continues to lecture them on how they should treat the women in their own lives.

Thet becomes more and more petulant. Their housekeepers keep quitting because of her and Kyaw ends up doing the housework. He hides this when Htoo and Lin come over one Saturday and invite him to golf with them. He pretends to boss Thet around, but he doesn't go because secretly he has to wash the dishes.

Eventually Thet has a tantrum in public at a poultry market and in desperation Kyaw confides his troubles to a clerk at his office. She offers to take him to her cousin who runs an employment agency for domestic workers. At the agency, they find Thet and Htoo's fiancée. Thet flies into a jealous rage and Kyaw moves out of the house, but hides this from people because of peer pressure. Thet's cousin comes to stay and the neighbors mistake her for a thief and call the police. When she's arrested both families find out about the split. Kya's and Thet's parents come to town to try to patch things up, but the couple is stubborn, so the families take their children back with them to their respective home towns.

== Release ==
It was released on February 28, 2003.
