= Taungthaman Thitsar =

2006 Burmese Film

- VCD Released Poster
- Burmese: တောင်သမန်သစ္စာ
- Directed by: Maung Nanda
- Screenplay by: Zaw Myint Oo
- Based on: Taungthaman Thitsar by Kalyar (Arts / Science)
- Produced by: Nway Nway Hlaing
- Starring: Yan Aung; May Than Nu; Ye Aung; Nawarat; Dwe; Nandar Hlaing
- Cinematography: Htun Htun Win
- Edited by: Taw Win
- Music by: Khin Maung Gyi
- Production company: Hlaing Film Production
- Release date: 2006
- Running time: 144 minutes
- Country: Myanmar
- Language: Burmese

Taungthaman Thitsar (Burmese: တောင်သမန်သစ္စာ) is a 2006 Burmese drama film, directed by Maung Nanda starring Yan Aung, May Than Nu, Ye Aung, Nawarat, Dwe and Nandar Hlaing.

== Cast ==
- Yan Aung as Kaung Myat
- May Than Nu as Khin Oo
- Ye Aung as Kyaw Swar Oo
- Nawarat as Sate Htar Myat
- Dwe as Pone Nya
- Nandar Hlaing as Yupar / Daw Khin Khin Myat (dual role)

== Awards ==
Year	Award	Category	Nominee	Result
2006	Myanmar Motion Picture Academy Awards	Best Actress	Nandar Hlaing	Won
2006	Myanmar Motion Picture Academy Awards	Best Screenplay	Zaw Myint Oo	Won
2006	Myanmar Motion Picture Academy Awards	Best Sound	Myo Nyunt	Won
