= Our Beloved =

Our Beloved (Burmese: ကျွန်တော်တို့ ချစ်သော; Kyuntawto Chitthaw) is a 2018 Burmese war film by director U Win Saung, focusing on a conflict between Myanmar Army soldiers and a drug-trafficking warlord. Starring Soe Ran Aung and Moe Yu San, it has been described as a military propaganda film. The film was released on 15 June 2018.

== Production ==
The film was funded by the Chan Thar and Red Radiance Film production houses. The film was supported by Hla Swe, who stated that "[...] those who have patriotism in their heart will like this movie."

== Box office ==
The film did poorly, screening for only two weeks in Yangon. Reception was generally negative.
