= Dwe =

Burmese film actor and singer

- ဒွေး
- Born: Htin Lin; 7 May 1966; Rangoon, Burma
- Died: 11 July 2007 (aged 41); Yangon, Myanmar
- Burial place: Yayway Cemetery
- Other name: Thar Gyi
- Citizenship: Myanmar
- Education: Rangoon Institute of Technology
- Occupations: Actor, Singer
- Spouse: Pa Pa Win
- Children: Wai Yan Moe
- Parents: Tin Htun Maung (father); Aye Aye Thin (mother)
- Relatives: Kyaw Hein (uncle)
- Awards: Myanmar Motion Picture Academy Award(1997)

Dwe (Burmese: ဒွေး; also spelt Dway, born Htin Lin (ထင်လင်း) 7 May 1966 – 11 July 2007) was a Burmese film actor and singer. He starred in hundreds of films and was considered one of the most successful actors in Burmese cinema. He is most recognized by his audiences as a singer and an actor.

== Early life and education ==
Htin Lin (Dwe) was born on 7 May 1966, in Yangon, Burma, to Tin Htun Maung and Aye Aye Thin. He studied at Basic Education High School No. 1 Dagon for primary and secondary schooling. He later studied at Yangon Institute of Technology and holds a degree in electrical engineering. Dwe was married to Pa Pa Win, also known as Moe Moe. The two had an adopted son, Wai Yan Moe.

== Career ==
Dwe at first wanted to be a singer before becoming an actor, but unexpectedly, he was approached by his uncle Kyaw Hein to help star in a film while studying at Yangon Institute of Technology which started his career as an actor. He first entered the film industry with his real name Htin Lin (ထင်လင်း), but adopted a stage name, to Dwe in 1993. He worked with Kyaw Hein who directed the drug education film 1993's Dukkha Go Ayaung Hso De (ဒုက္ခကို အရောင်ဆိုးတယ်) and another very famous war movie 1994's Wai Le Mhway Kyway Lae Mhway (ဝေလည်းမွှေး၊ ကြွေလည်းမွှေး). Which became a hit with audiences. Under the guidance of his uncle, Academy Kyaw Hein, Dwe became successful in the film industry and later won the 1997 Myanmar Motion Picture Academy Awards for Best Actor in the Leading Role of 1997's A Mae Chay Yar (အမေ့ခြေရာ). Within just a few years he became a superstar who acted in many popular movies and videos, and shot commercials. The last film he acted in was Kambar Tachan Nya - Night of halved world (ကမ္ဘာတစ်ခြမ်းည) which was not finished, directed by Cho Tu Zaw.

He was also successful in the music industry, releasing over 30 songs which included his solo album Tunlin Gwang Abeba (ထွန်းလင်းခွင့်ပေးပါ) and a series of other albums. He has also appeared in a number of popular music series.

== Death ==
He was diagnosed with heart disease in 2007. On Wednesday 11 July of the same year around 4:00 pm local time he suddenly died of a heart attack at his home on the Aye Thar Yar Road. According to his close friend Director Aung Myo Min, he died of sleep apnea triggered by regular sleeping pills, not related to any illicit drugs or heroine as some people thought. Dwe was 42 years old at the time of his death. At 4 am on 13 July, at home, he received virtuous deeds from the Ping Sangha and had a water blessing ritual performed. The cremation took place at 5:00 a.m. at the Yayway Cemetery. He brought back Dwe's ashes and a pagoda was erected at Chaung Wa Monastery. A statue of his eldest son and his Academy Gold Medal were donated by Dwe and are kept in at the Monastery. His uncle, Sayadaw U Kittithara (former actor Kyaw Hein), died on 11 July 2020, coinciding with the date of their deaths.

Before Dwe's death he made a painting which was on display from 1 to 6 June 2009, at Azada Hall, 34th Street, Yangon to commemorate the second anniversary of Dwe's death. Its proceeds anll 11 of his works were donated to a press fund.

== Filmography ==
List of films
Year	Film	Director	Co-stars	Notes
1993	Dukkha Go Ayaung Hso De	Kyaw Hein ?	Htin Lin ?	
1994	Wai Lae Hmway Kyway Lae Hmway	Khin Maung Oo+Soe Thein Htut	Kyaw Hein, Wyne, Tint Tint Tun, Myint Myint Khaing	
1995	Meinn Ma Lel Thein Kyawy	Khin Maung Oo+Soe Thein Htut	Moss, Zaw Oo, Nay San, Wyne, Moh Moh Myint Aung, Khin Soe Paing	
1995	Jizz Toe	Khin Maung Oo+Soe Thein Htut	Moh Moh Myint Aung, Moss, Chit Sayar	
1995	A Chit Nae A Kaung A Daii Phyit Si Me	Malekha Soe Htike Aung	Lwin Moe, Min Oo, May Than Nu	
1996	Lu Wyne	Khin Maung Oo	Moh Moh Myint Aung	
1996	Yel Sa Yar Maww Sa Yar	Maung Wunna	Zin Wyne, Yu Pa, Myo Thandar Htun, Su Dar Li	
1996	Thit Sar Phyit Si Yin At Taww	Malekha Soe Htike Aung	Nay Thura Oo, Lu Min, Cho Pyone, Moh Moh Myint Aung, Saw Naing(Shan), Tin Tin Hla	
1996	A Chit Like Yè Larr	Malekha Soe Htike Aung	Htet Htet Moe Oo, Tun Tun Naing, Myint Myint Khaing	
1997	A May Chay Yar (Mother's Footprints)	Khin Maung Oo+Soe Thein Htut	May Than Nu, Cho Pyone, Myint Myint Khin, Zaw Oo, Min Thu, Honey Tun, Daw Phyo	Won-Best Actor
1997	Bel Ka Lar Dae A Chit Lel	Myo Myint Aung	Htet Htet Moe Oo, Nwae Nwae San, Khin Soe Paing, Ku Thol, Nyi Gyaw	
1997	Tann Ta Chin Mha Way Bar Si	Kyi Myint	Zaw Lin, May Than Nu, Soe Moe Kyi, Myat Kay Khaing, Kyaw Naing (Pyi Htaung Su), Nwae Nwae San, Khin Lay Swe	
1997	Yin Khwin Nan Taw	Malikha Soe Htike Aung	Nyunt Win, Htun Eaindra Bo, Nandar Hlaing	
1998	Ah Hnaii Mae Yin Khun	Malekha Soe Htike Aung	Nyunt Win, Nandar Hlaing, Khin Than Nu	
1999	Ah Phae Nay Yar	Khin Maung Oo+Soe Thein Htut	Thar Nyi, Zaw Oo, Maung Maung Myint, May Than Nu, Myo Thandar Tun, Kyi Lei Lei Oo	
2000	Thamee Shin	Khin Maung Oo+Soe Thein Htut	Yan Aung, Sai Bo Bo, Wyne, Khin Than Nu, Cho Pyone, Myo Thandar Tun, Eaindra Kyaw Zin, Soe Moe Kyi, Nwae Nwae San	
2000	Ma Mone Lay Nae Ngapali	Zin Yaw Maung Maung	Yan Aung, Moe Di, May Than Nu, Eaindra Kyaw Zin, Nwae Nwae San	
2000	Maung Mu Paing Shin	Ko San Aung	Lwin Moe, Htun Eaindra Bo, Htet Htet Moe Oo, Ku Thol	
2001	Pin Sa Let Yin Khun	Malekha Soe Htike Aung	Min Oo, Htet Htet Moe Oo, Eaindra Kyaw Zin, Hla Eain Za Li Tint	
2001	Eain Met Yar Thi	Mee Pwar	Moh Moh Myint Aung, Eaindra Kyaw Zin, Nay Toe, Aung Lwin	
2001	A Chit Ka Ma Mae Tat Buu	Mg Pyae Wa (Pan Wai Thi)	Soe Myat Thuzar, Ah Yine	
2001	Chit Chin Ei Ah Char Mae Naik	Zin Yaw Maung Maung	May Than Nu, Khaing Thin Kyi	
2001	Yin Htae Mar Bar Nyar Bar Nyar	Naung Tun Lun+Nyi Nyi Tun Lwin	Nay Aung, Tun Tun Naing, Htet Htet Moe Oo, Soe Myat Nandar, Poe Phyu Thae, Khin Soe Paing, San San Aye	
2002	Hlo-Whayt-Yin-Khone-Than (Secret Heart Beat)	Malekha Soe Htike Aung	Yar Zar Ne Win, Htet Htet Moe Oo, Aung Lwin, Ant Kyaw, Khin Soe Paing	
2002	A Chit The Lay Pyay	Ko Aung Min Thein	Eaindra Kyaw Zin, Phyo Ngwe Soe, Sai Bo Bo, Kutho, Smile, Nawarat	
2002	Yin Dwin Sa Karr	Khin Maung Oo+Soe Thein Htut	May Than Nu, Eaindra Kyaw Zin, Zaganar, Khu To, King Kaung	
2002	Min Nae Ma Chit Tat Pyi	Khin Maung Oo+Soe Thein Htut	Nay Aung, Thuh Maung, Wyne, Ku Thol, Phoe Phyu, Nget Pyaw Kyaw, Eaindra Kyaw Zin, Zu Zu Maung	
2002	Yin Wat Pann	Mite Ti	Lu Min, Eaindra Kyaw Zin, Tun Tun Win	
2003	Nget Ka Lay Yeah Dan Dar Yee	Mike Tee	Htet Htet Moe Oo, Lin Zarni Zaw, Soe Myat Nandar, Ya Wai Aung, Moe Di, Yu Pa, Myint Myint Khin	
2003	Da Bae Naw (That's it)	Maung Maung Oo (Snow White)	Nine Nine, Ku Thol, Aye Yar, Kyaw Htoo, Maung Maung Myint, Nandar Hlaing, Kyi Lei Lei Oo, Cho Pyone, Nwae Nwae San, Aye Aye Khaing	
2003	Chit Chin Yin Khon Yawng Kyi Swar Phyit	Lwin Min	Tint Tint Tun, Eaindra Kyaw Zin	
2003	Nhyoe Thaw Pinlal Swal Ngin Thaw Lamin	Kyi Phyu Shin	Htun Eaindra Bo, Yadanar Khin	
2003	Mi Ma Ya Dae Nit Swel Myar(Unforgotable Days)	Malekha Soe Htike Aung	Khant Si Thu, Zaw Oo, Htet Htet Moe Oo, Myat Kay Thi Aung, Su Pan Htwar, Myint Myint Khaing, Khin Soe Paing, Chaw Yadanar, Poe Phyu Thae	
2003	Pyang Bat Mah Shih	Naung Tun Lun+Nyi Nyi Tun Lwin	Htun Eaindra Bo, Kyi Lei Lei Oo	
2003	A Chit Nae Tu Ei Gon Teik Khar	Maung Nanda	Yan Aung, Htun Eaindra Bo, Nandar Hlaing	
2003	Kan Lun Pin Lel Pyin Ko Ba Ho Pyuh Ywe	Ko Zaw (Ar Yon Oo)	Nandar Hlaing, Nay Aung, Khin Hlaing, Yadanar Khin	
2004	Ta Khar Ta Yan Hni A Chit The Ei Tho Phit Tat The	Malekha Soe Htike Aung	Ye Aung, Htet Htet Moe Oo	
2004	Naug Ma Kja Kyay	Mg Myo Min (Yin Twin Phit)	Nanda, Ah Yine, Aung Lwin, Eaindra Kyaw Zin, Khine Thin Kyi	
2004	Ko Dai Yee Yar Za Win	Mg Myo Min (Yin Twin Phit)	Lwin Moe, Ye Aung, Hackett, Nandar Hlaing, Khine Thin Kyi, May Thinzar Oo, Pearl Win	
2004	Yin Khon Tan A Yin Hni Sone	Naung Tun Lwin+Nyi Nyi Tun Lwin	Phyo Ngwe Soe, Byite, Kyaw Htoo, Htin Paw, Wyne, Zaw Zaw Aung, Eaindra Kyaw Zin, Aye Wit Yi Thaung, Hnin Wit Yi Thaung, Gone Pon Lay	
2004	Eain Met Nat Thamee	Khin Maung Oo+Soe Thein Htut	Thu Htoo San, Htun Eaindra Bo, Eaindra Kyaw Zin, Pearl Win	
2004	Kar Yan Ah Lwael	Khin Maung Oo+Soe Thein Htut	Zaganar, Tun Tun Win, Nyaung Nyaung, Soe Myat Thuzar, Nandar Hlaing, Khin Soe Paing	
2004	Pyone Nay Yin Tha Dih Htar	Maung Myo Min (Yin Twin Phit)	Kyaw Ye Aung, Yar Zar Ne Win, Sharr Nyo, Pyay Ti Oo, Htun Eaindra Bo, Khine Hnin Wai, Myint Myint Khaing, Pearl Win	
2005	Chit Chin Phwat Met Tar	Khin Maung Oo+Soe Thein Htut	Phoe Kyaw, Min Thu, Min Htet Kyaw Zin, Myint Naing, Tint Tint Tun, Myat Kay Thi Aung, Eaindra Kyaw Zin, Su Pan Htwar, Khine Hnin Wai	
2005	Ah Chit Yae Nel Sat Ah Hmone Tae Myo Yoe	Naung Tun Lwin+Nyi Nyi Tun Lwin	Kyaw Ye Aung, Min Hein, Wyne, Ah Yine, Eaindra Kyaw Zin, Nawarat	
2005	Kyo Nah Sah	Khin Maung Oo+Soe Thein Htut	Tint Tint Tun, Eaindra Kyaw Zin, Myint Myint Khin, Ku Thol, Nyo Min Lwin	
2006	Thone Thone Le Chit	Maung Nanda	Yan Aung, Sharr Nyo, Soe Myat Nandar, Eaindra Kyaw Zin, Hla Eain Za Li Tint, Khine Hnin Wai	
2006	Taungthaman Thitsar	Maung Nanda	Yan Aung, Ye Aung, May Than Nu, Nandar Hlaing, Nawarat	
2006	Hlae Sar	Thein Han (Phoenix)	Kyaw Ye Aung, Thar Nyi, Moe Di, Khin Hlaing, Khine Thin Kyi	
2006	Myaw Lint Chin Myar Swar	Maung Myo Min (Yin Twin Phit)	Yan Aung, Ye Aung, Min Maw Kun, Nine Nine, Hat Kat, Phoe Kyaw, May Thinzar Oo, Pan Phyu, Soe Myat Nandar, Nawarat, Paing Phyo Thu	
2007	Ket Kinn	Mg Myo Min (Yin Twin Phit)	Yan Aung, Ye Aung, Kyaw Ye Aung, Nandar Hlaing, May Thinzar Oo	
2008	Hnin Si Moe Tain	Dwe	Eaindra Kyaw Zin, Soe Myat Thuzar, Thar Nyi	
