= Massage Practitioner =

1922 film

- Burmese: အနှိပ်သည်
- Directed by: Par Gyi
- Produced by: British Burma Film Company
- Distributed by: British Burma Film Company
- Release date: 14 November 1922
- Country: Myanmar

A Nait The or Massage Practitioner (Burmese: အနှိပ်သည်) is a 1922 Burmese black & white silent comedy short film.

== Cast ==
- Par Gyi
- Khin Khin Nu

== Release ==
It was shown on 14 November 1922. This short film is 4000 feet long. Censor no. is 1533.
