= Secret Heart Beat =

- Secret Heart Beat's VCD released poster
- Directed by: Ma Li Kha Soe Htike Aung
- Screenplay by: Ko Ko Lay
- Based on: Secret Heart Beat by Ponnya Khin
- Produced by: Ma Li Kha Film Production
- Starring: Dwe; Htet Htet Moe Oo; Yaza Ne Win
- Release date: 6 December 2002
- Running time: 120 minutes
- Country: Myanmar
- Language: Burmese

Secret Heart Beat (Burmese: လျှို့ဝှက်ရင်ခုန်သံ) is a 2002 Burmese film, directed by Ma Li Kha Soe Htike Aung starring Dwe, Htet Htet Moe Oo and Yaza Ne Win. The film, produced by Ma Li Kha Film Production, premiered in Myanmar on 6 December 2002.

== Synopsis ==
This film showed love between three people: Thway Thit, a person who is light-hearted and careless, Nyi Khit, a person who is calm and honest and Lone May Khin, a young girl who is honest and confident.

== Cast ==
- Aung Lwin as U Khant Aung
- Dwe as Nyi Khit (son)
- Yaza Ne Win as Thway Thit (son)
- Htet Htet Moe Oo as Lone May Khin
