= Box No. 88 =

2019 Burmese drama film

- Film poster
- Burmese: သေတ္တာနံပါတ် ၈၈
- Directed by: Win Lwin Htet
- Written by: Nay Hein
- Starring: Nay Toe; Eaindra Kyaw Zin; Htun Htun
- Cinematography: Arkar Toe
- Production company: 7th Sense Film Production
- Release date: November 7, 2019
- Running time: 120 minutes
- Country: Myanmar
- Language: Burmese

Box No. 88 (Burmese: သေတ္တာနံပါတ် ၈၈) is a 2019 Burmese drama film starring Nay Toe, Eaindra Kyaw Zin and Htun Htun. The film, produced by 7th Sense Film Production premiered in Myanmar on November 7, 2019.

== Cast ==
- Nay Toe as Ye Htet
- Eaindra Kyaw Zin as Waddi Nwe (his wife)
- Hnin Thway Yu Aung (child actress) as daughter of Ye Htet (his daughter)
- Htun Htun as That Ti
- Kaew Korravee as lady#
- Thar Nyi as police chief
