= Ngwe Pay Lo Ma Ya =

1932 Burmese black & white film

Ngwe Pay Lo Ma Ya (It's No Use Giving Money)
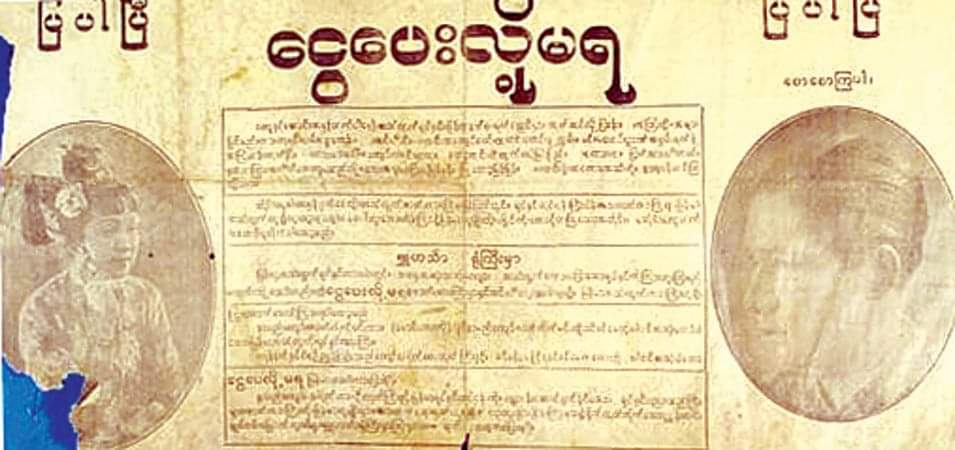
- Film Poster
- Burmese: ငေွပေးလို့မရ
- Directed by: Tot Gyi
- Based on: Sai Khun Sa Awng: Kham Lern Laeng
- Starring: Ai Ko; Khin Maung Nyunt; Khin May Gyi; Chit Tin Gyi; Mandalar Thaung; May Aung Kyi
- Production company: Win Studios
- Release date: 1932
- Running time: 90 minutes
- Country: Myanmar
- Language: Burmese
- Budget: 60,000 kyat

Ngwe Pay Lo Ma Ya (Burmese: ငွေပေးလို့မရ; It's No Use Giving Money) is a 1932 Burmese black-and-white movie and the first Burmese motion picture with synchronized sound to be ever released in the country. The film was directed by Tot Gyi, who was one of the earliest successful Burmese film directors.

== Production and Release ==
The film was shot in India, mostly around Calcutta and Bombay. The 22-cast members including the director Tot Gyi, the author and assistant director Dagon Nat Shin and the performers Aye Ko, Khin Maung Nyunt, Khin May Gyi and Khin May Lay travelled first to Calcutta on a steam-ship where the screenplay was finalised and the rehearsals were also made. The film was directed and completed within 33 days and it was shipped back to Rangoon in May 1932.

It was produced with the help of the Imperial Film Company in India who also supplied most of the equipment and cameras. It was released on 18 May 1932 at Plaza Cinema in Rangoon. As it was the first Burmese "talkie", it was a major commercial success despite poor voice performances by the performers and sound sequences. It grossed over 100,000 Kyats within 8 weeks when one tical of gold was equaled to 4 kyats. The gross revenue enabled the producer Na Za Mi to make the second "talkie" which was a major failure. The third "talkie" from the same producer was also a commercial failure as the story plot was unrealistic as the cinema-goers called it. This made Na Za Mi to resign completely from the Burmese film business. The British Burma Film Company later took over and became success in "talkie" producing business.

== Cast ==
- Aye Ko
- Khin Maung Nyunt
- Khin May Gyi
- Chit Tin Gyi
- Mandalar Thaung
- May Aye Kyi
