= Trading Women =

2003 film

Trading Women.
- Directed by: David A. Feingold
- Written by: David A. Feingold
- Narrated by: Angelina Jolie
- Distributed by: Documentary Educational Resources
- Release date: 2003
- Running time: 77 min.
- Countries: Burma; United States
- Language: English

Trading Women is a 2003 documentary film by anthropologist David A. Feingold, produced by Dean W. Slotar and narrated by Angelina Jolie. It covers human trafficking of girls from hill tribes in Burma, Laos, Thailand and China into the sex industry of Thailand.

The film states that the largest group of persons trafficked into the Thai sex industry come from Burma, and that these persons do not normally end up in establishments serving Western customers. Rejecting simplistic and moralistic solutions, the film cites as root causes of the trafficking problem the economic and political situation in Burma, the destruction of the traditional economy in Thai hill tribe regions resulting from development and opium suppression programs, corruption among police and border guards, and the inability of many Thai hill tribe people to obtain proper identification papers and participate in society.
