= A Chit The Lay Pyay =

2002 film directed by Ko Aung Min Thein

- Film Poster
- Burmese: အချစ်သည်လေပြေ
- Directed by: Ko Aung Min Thein
- Screenplay by: Min Khite Soe San
- Story by: Ko Aung Min Thein
- Starring: Dwe; Eaindra Kyaw Zin; Sai Bo Bo; Phyo Ngwe Soe; Smile; Nawarat
- Cinematography: Than Nyunt (Panthar)
- Edited by: Nyunt Myanmar Nyi Nyi Aung
- Music by: Emperor (Burmese band), Iron Cross, Thein Lwin (Danamoe)
- Production company: Myint Myittar Film Production
- Release date: June 28, 2002
- Running time: 112 minutes
- Country: Myanmar
- Language: Burmese

A Chit The Lay Pyay (Burmese: အချစ်သည်လေပြေ) is a 2002 romantic-drama film, directed by Ko Aung Min Thein starring Dwe, Eaindra Kyaw Zin, Sai Bo Bo, Phyo Ngwe Soe, Smile and Nawarat. It premiered in Myanmar Cinemas on June 28, 2002.

== Cast ==
- Dwe as Nay Min
- Eaindra Kyaw Zin as Lay Pyay
- Sai Bo Bo as Shan Lay
- Phyo Ngwe Soe as Phyo Ngwe Soe
- Smile as Ngu Wah
- Nawarat as Nway Oo
- Win Naing as Ko Kyaw Gyi
- Nyaung Nyaung as Pae Si
- Kutho as Johnny
