= Kaba Sone Hti =

- Burmese: ကမ္ဘာဆုံးထိ
- Directed by: Khin Maung Oo and Soe Thein Htut
- Written by: Khin Maung Oo and Soe Thein Htut
- Starring: Htun Htun; Eaindra Kyaw Zin, Wyne Su Khine Thein
- Cinematography: Khin Maung Oo and Soe Thein Htut
- Release date: 2005
- Country: Myanmar

Kaba Sone Hti (Burmese: ကမ္ဘာဆုံးထိ [ɡəbà zóʊɰ̃ tʰi]; lit. Till the End of the World) is a 2005 Burmese musical drama film directed by Khin Maung Oo and Soe Thein Htut starring Htun Htun and Eaindra Kyaw Zin and Wyne Su Khine Thein.

== Cast ==
- Htun Htun
- Eaindra Kyaw Zin
- Wyne Su Khine Thein
