= Wai Lae Hmway Kyway Lae Hmway =

1994 Burmese Film

- Burmese: ဝေလည်းမွှေးကြွေလည်းမွှေး
- Directed by: Khin Maung Oo; Soe Thein Htut
- Screenplay by: Mya Than San
- Starring: Kyaw Hein; Dwe; Myint Myint Khine; Tint Tint Tun
- Production company: Aung Tharaphu Film Production
- Release date: 1994
- Running time: 120 minutes
- Country: Myanmar
- Language: Burmese

Wai Lae Hmway Kyway Lae Hmway (Burmese: ဝေလည်းမွှေးကြွေလည်းမွှေး), is a 1994 Burmese military- drama film starring Kyaw Hein, Dwe, Myint Myint Khine and Tint Tint Tun. Kyaw Hein won the Best Supporting Actor Award in 1994 Myanmar Motion Picture Academy Awards for this film.

== Cast ==
- Kyaw Hein as Sergeant Phoe Si, father of Captain Ye Min Aung
- Dwe as Captain Ye Min Aung
- Myint Myint Khine as Mi Aye, mother of Captain Ye Min Aung
- Tint Tint Tun as Ma Ma Soe
