= Myet Nhar Myar Tae Kaung Kin =

2004 Burmese Film

- Poster
- Burmese: မျက်နှာများတဲ့ကောင်းကင်
- Directed by: Maung Myo Min
- Screenplay by: Nyein Min
- Story by: Maung Myo Min
- Produced by: U Nyi Nyi Aung
- Starring: Yan Aung; Lwin Moe; Tint Tint Htun; Eaindra Kyaw Zin
- Cinematography: Min Min
- Edited by: Zaw Win Htway
- Music by: Aung Myat Htet
- Production company: Shwe Nge Nge Films
- Release date: 2004
- Running time: 117 minutes
- Country: Myanmar
- Language: Burmese

Myet Nhar Myar Tae Kaung Kin (Burmese: မျက်နှာများတဲ့ကောင်းကင်) is a 2004 Burmese drama film, directed by Maung Myo Min starring Yan Aung, Lwin Moe, Tint Tint Htun and Eaindra Kyaw Zin. Eaindra Kyaw Zin won her first Academy Award in 2004 Myanmar Motion Picture Academy Awards for this film.

== Synopsis ==
Kyaw Swar and Sandy were in love but married U Myat Noe Aung for some reason. Kyaw Swar did not accept Julia's love and said that he only loved Sandy. U Myat Noe Aung knew that Sandy was pregnant with Kyaw Swar, but lied to Sandy. One day, Kyaw Swar told Sandy about it and found out. Kyaw Swar wanted the baby back but could not. Sandy died after giving birth. Only U Myat Noe Aung was allowed to take care of the child.

== Cast ==
- Yan Aung as U Myat Noe Aung
- Lwin Moe as Kyaw Swar
- Tint Tint Htun as Julia
- Eaindra Kyaw Zin as Sandy
- Phoe Kyaw as Zaw Gyi

== Award ==
Year	Award	Category	Nominee	Result
2004	Myanmar Motion Picture Academy Awards	Best Actress	Eaindra Kyaw Zin	Won
