= Nay Ka Mway Tae La =

2003 Burmese Film

- Film poster
- Burmese: နေကမွေးတဲ့လ
- Directed by: Maung Tin Oo
- Screenplay by: Nyein Min
- Story by: Myate Tin Aung
- Starring: Kyaw Hein; Min Maw Kun; Tint Tint Htun; Eaindra Kyaw Zin
- Cinematography: Kyauk Phyu (Padathar)
- Edited by: Zaw Min (Hanthar Myay)
- Music by: Zaw Myo Htut
- Production company: Myittar Yaung Pyan Films
- Release date: 2003
- Running time: 168 minutes
- Country: Myanmar
- Language: Burmese

Nay Ka Mway Tae La (Burmese: နေကမွေးတဲ့လ) is a 2003 Burmese drama film, directed by starring Kyaw Hein, Min Maw Kun, Tint Tint Htun and Eaindra Kyaw Zin.

== Cast ==
- Kyaw Hein as Chek Kyi
- Min Maw Kun as Pone Ka Lay, Kyaw Kyaw
- Tint Tint Htun as Tha Ra Phu
- Eaindra Kyaw Zin as Yamin
- Zaw Win Naing as Gate Kyi
- Bay Lu Wa as Yate Kyi
- Kyaw Htoo as Htee Kyi

== Awards ==
Year	Award	Category	Nominee	Result
2003	Myanmar Motion Picture Academy Awards	Best Actor	Kyaw Hein	Won
2003	Myanmar Motion Picture Academy Awards	Best Music	Zaw Myo Htut	Won
