= A Mhya A Mhya =

2019 Burmese Film

A Mhya..A Mhya...
- Film Poster
- Burmese: အမျှ..အမျှ...
- Directed by: Steel (Dwe Myittar)
- Starring: Khant Si Thu; Eaindra Kyaw Zin; Lin Zarni Zaw
- Cinematography: Boni
- Edited by: NS Dawn
- Production company: R Square Films
- Release date: October 3, 2019
- Running time: 114 minutes
- Country: Myanmar
- Language: Burmese

A Mhya..A Mhya... (Burmese: အမျှ..အမျှ...) is a 2019 Burmese horror drama film, directed by Steel (Dwe Myittar) starring Khant Si Thu, Eaindra Kyaw Zin and Lin Zarni Zaw. It was produced by R Square Films and premiered in Myanmar on October 3, 2019.

== Cast ==
- Khant Si Thu as Nway Oo
- Eaindra Kyaw Zin as Moe Ma Kha
- Chit Snow (child actress) as Saung Hay Man
- Yoon May (child actress) as Snow White
- Lin Zarni Zaw
