= A May Chay Yar =

1997 Burmese Film

- Film Poster
- Burmese: အမေ့ခြေရာ
- Directed by: Khin Maung Oo; Soe Thein Htut
- Screenplay by: Khin Maung Oo; Soe Thein Htut
- Based on: A May Chay Yar by Chit San Win
- Starring: Dwe; Cho Pyone; May Than Nu; Honey Htun
- Cinematography: Ko Ko Htay (Htake Tan)
- Edited by: Aung Thwin
- Music by: Trumpet Win Oo
- Production company: Moe Lyan Film Production
- Release date: 1997
- Running time: 114 minutes
- Country: Myanmar
- Language: Burmese

A May Chay Yar (Burmese: အမေ့ခြေရာ) is a 1997 Burmese drama film, directed by Khin Maung Oo & Soe Thein Htut starring Dwe, Cho Pyone, May Than Nu and Honey Htun.

== Cast ==
- Dwe as Tin Maung Oo, Pho Ngo
- Cho Pyone as Daw Cho Cho
- May Than Nu as Pyae Pyae
- Honey Htun as Honey, Ni Ma
- Zaw Oo as U Kyaw Swar
- Min Thu as Tin Maung Htwe, Nga Htwe
- Pi Si as Aung Gyi
- Saw Naing as Father of Pyae Pyae
- Kaythumadi Myo Aung as U Thet Hnin

== Awards ==
Year	Award	Category	Nominee	Result
1997	Myanmar Motion Picture Academy Awards	Best Actor	Dwe	Won
1997	Myanmar Motion Picture Academy Awards	Best Supporting Actress	Cho Pyone	Won
