= Ta Khar Ta Yan Nite A Chit The Ei Tho Phit Tat The =

- Burmese: တစ်ခါတရံ၌အချစ်သည်ဤသို့ဖြစ်တတ်သည်
- Directed by: Malikha Soe Htike Aung
- Written by: Nwe Myo Htut
- Produced by: Malikha
- Starring: Dwe; Htet Htet Moe Oo; Ye Aung
- Cinematography: Shwe Ye Phyo
- Distributed by: Malikha
- Release date: June 4, 2004
- Country: Myanmar
- Language: Burmese

Ta Khar Ta Yan Nite A Chit The Ei Tho Phit Tat The (Burmese: တစ်ခါတရံ၌အချစ်သည်ဤသို့ဖြစ်တတ်သည်) is a 2004 Burmese romantic drama film directed by Malikha Soe Htike Aung starring Dwe and Htet Htet Moe Oo. The film, produced by Malikha film production premiered in Myanmar on June 4, 2004.

== Plot summary ==
It is about a girl who cannot forgot her first love and about a programmer who comes to Yangon.

== Cast ==
- Dwe
- Htet Htet Moe Oo
- Ye Aung

== Release ==
It is started showing June 4, 2004 at Twin, Tamata, Mingalar in Yangon, Win Lite, Myo Ma in Mandalay.
