= Goon Pone =

Burmese actress and presenter

Tat Ka Tho Goon Pone
- ဂွမ်းပုံ
- Born: Myanmar
- Occupation: Actress
- Partner: Myat Htun Shwe

Goon Pone also Tat Ka Tho Goon Pone (Burmese: ဂွမ်းပုံ; born 31 August) is one of the most popular and Myanmar Academy Award winning Burmese actresses and presenters. She won her first Best Supporting Actress Academy Award in 2015. She has acted in over 50 films.

== Personal life ==
Goon married Myat Htun Shwe.

== Awards and nominations ==
Year	Award	Category	Nominated work	Result
2015	Myanmar Academy Award	Best Supporting Actress	ဤအရာကိုအချစ်ဟုခေါ်သလား	Won
