= Moe Di =

Burmese actor

- မိုးဒီ
- Born: Than Tun; 16 January 1948; Hinthada, Myanmar
- Occupations: Actor, Comedian

Moe Di (Burmese: မိုးဒီ; born 16 January 1948) is a Burmese comedian and actor who became famous in kyuntot Thabin Tin Moe Win Drama with comedian Mos. He has acted in more than 80 films and 200 videos.

He won the Best Supporting Actor award at the 2007 Myanmar Academy Award for his performance in the film Koe-Sal-Hsa Thar-Lein-Mal (Ninety Times More Superior).

== Early life and careers ==
Moe Di was born on January 16, 1948, in Hinthada to his father, U Han Tin, and mother, Daw Khin Myint. He is the youngest of three siblings. He studied up to the seventh grade.

== Awards and nominations ==
Year	Award	Category	Nominated work	Result
2007	Myanmar Academy Award	Best Supporting Actor	Koe-Sal-Hsa Thar-Lein-Mal (Ninety Times More Superior)	Won
