= Nandar Hlaing =

Burmese actress

- နန္ဒာလှိုင်
- Born: 2 November 1974 (age 51); Mawlamyine, Mon State, Myanmar.
- Education: Yangon University
- Occupation: Actress
- Spouse: Zay Thiha (m. 2008)
- Children: Zay Wati Hlaing; Zay Yati Hlaing; Zay Madi Hlaing
- Relatives: Khin Shwe (father-in-law)

Nandar Hlaing (Burmese: နန္ဒာလှိုင်; also spelt Nanda Hlaing) is a Burmese film actress of Mon descent. She was one of the leading actresses of Myanmar from mid 90s to mid 2000s. She won the 1998 Myanmar Motion Picture Academy Awards for best supporting actress for her performance in Shwe Natha San-Ein. She also won the 2006 Academy Award for best actress.

In January 2012, Nandar Hlaing's company, Mahar Nandar Trading Company, became the exclusive authorized retailer of Missha cosmetics within Myanmar.

== Career ==
Nandar Hlaing started her career as a calendar girl during the early 90s. During the country's transition to an open market system and the increasing popularity of TV commercials, she became a popular commercial actress along with Htet Htet Moe Oo and Khaing Thin Kyi. The Myanmar film industry then was on a decline due to shrinkage of the market and resulted in the expansion of video industry. Nandar Hlaing quickly transitioned to Video and Films, gradually establishing herself as one of the leading actresses of the country.

== Personal life ==
Nandar Hlaing is married to Zay Thiha, the son of Khin Shwe, a Burmese tycoon. The couple wed in May 2008. On 19 April 2011, she gave birth to her second daughter, Zay Yadi Hlaing. On 24 July 2014, she gave birth to her third daughter, Zay Madi Hlaing, in Yangon.
