= Htun Eaindra Bo =

Htun Aeindra Bo ထွန်းအိန္ဒြာဗို
- Birth name: Mi Mi Khine
- Born: 1 May 1966 (age 59)
- Origin: Mogok, Mandalay Division, Myanmar
- Genres: Pop, Country
- Occupation(s): actress, singer
- Instrument(s): Vocals, acoustic guitar
- Years active: 1991–present

Htun Eaindra Bo (Burmese: ထွန်းအိန္ဒြာဗို, pronounced [tʰʊ́ɰ̃ ʔèiɰ̃dɹà bò]; also Htun Aeindra Bo; born 1 May 1966) is a three-time Myanmar Academy Award winning actress and singer. The Mogok native began her film career in 1991, and has achieved fame and success as an actor and singer. Now in her 50s, she is still a household name in Myanmar, especially for rural Myanmar and continues to make films and performs in concerts.

== Background ==
Htun Eaindra Bo was born on 1 May 1966 in Mogok, Myanmar to Khin Mya Mya and Khin Maung Thein. She is the middle child of three; she has an elder brother and a younger sister, Thet Thet Khine, a House of Representatives MP. Her family was in the jewellery business. Mi Mi Khine was interested entertainment since she was little. She was singing Burmese songs at age four and by age eleven, she began to sing at local concerts.

She graduated with a law (LLB) degree.

== Career ==
Htun entered the entertainment industry with a direct-to-video film, called Kyeza Hnalontha (Professional Heart) in 1991. She released her first album in 1994 with songs by Maung Thit Min and Myo Kyawt Myaing. Her fandom names are Kdra (K for Khine, Dra for Aeindra) and Aeindraies.

She has made over 100 movies in her career.

== Personal life ==
She is married to Aung Minn Tun, and they have a son.

== Discography ==
=== Solo albums ===
- မင်းအတွက်ပဲ Min A Twet Pal (Only For You) (1994)
- နားလည်သင့်ပြီ Nar Lae Thint Pyi (You Should Understand) (1995)
- အိပ်မက်ညများ Eain Met Nya Myar (Dreamy Nights) (1997)
- ဆိုရင် So Yin (If So ...) (1998)
- ရည်းစားဦး Yee Sar Oo (First Love) (1998)
- 1999 (1999)
- ဆန္ဒရှိတဲ့အဟောင်းများ Sanda Shi Tae A Haung Myar (Desirous Old Songs) (1999)
- နေရာလေးတစ်ခု Nay Yar Lay Ta Khu (A Place) (2001)
- နှစ်ယောက်မရှိဘူး Nha Yaut Ma Shi Bu (There is no other one) (2002)
- တမ်းတနေဆဲ Tan Ta Nay Sel (Still wanting you) (2003)
- ဒိုင်ယာရီ Diary (Live Show) (2004)

=== Duet albums ===
- Gandaya Cafe (Desert Cafe) with Ringo and Alex
- Hsohn-Naing Gwint (Chance of Being Together) with Alex
- Thone-Youk Zaga (Three People Talk) with Tin Zar Maw and Madi
- Kaung Kin Ta Khu Yae Chit Chin (The love of the sky) with Bo Bo and Tun Tun
- Mohn Lo Ma Ya De Chitthu Tway (Couple who can't hate each other) with Dwe
- Myetsi Hmeit-pi Chit Lai Pa (Close you eyes and love it) with Tin Zar Maw
- Ta Gae Ma Chit Bae Nae (Don't really love) with Myo Kyawt Myaing

=== Collaborative albums ===
- A-Paing-A-Sa 1.5 (Fragment 1.5)
- A-Phyu-Yaung Thangegyin Tho (To White-Colored Friend)
- Honeymoon Khayi (Honeymoon Trip) -Saw Bwe Hmu Remembrance
- Mei Daw Ma Mei Bu (Haven't Forgotten) -L Khun Yi Live Show
- Min Atwet (For You)
- Alphne Thingyan
- Lu Min Wedding
- Romanson Live Show
- City FM

== Awards and nominations ==
Film awards:

Year	Award	Category	Nominated work	Result
1999	Myanmar Academy Award	Best Actress	Hnaung Ta Mye Mye (Deep and Unforgettable Sorrow)	Won
1999	Myanmar Academy Award	Best Actress	Yin-Del-Ka Saung Yar-Thi (Winter in My Heart)	Nominated
2003	Myanmar Academy Award	Best Actress	A-May Noh-Boe (Value of Mother's Milk)	Won
2004	Myanmar Academy Award	Best Actress	Ta-Khar-Ka Ayeyarwady Nya Myer (Ayeyarwady Nights, Once Upon A Time)	Nominated
2005	Myanmar Academy Award	Best Actress	Mogok Set-Waing Ko Kyaw-Lun Ywe (Beyond the Horizon)	Won
2017	Myanmar Academy Award	Best Supporting Actress	Nay Win Ate Tan Tat (Last Hours of Life)	Nominated
2018	Star Award	Best Actress	Naung Twin Ooh-Dan Ti Say Thadee	Nominated
2023	Myanmar Academy Award	Best Supporting Actress	Ko Pwar	Nominated

City FM Music Award

- She won 6 City FM Music Awards in three categories and four consecutive years.

Year	Award	Result
2002	Most Popular Female Vocalist of the Year	Won
2003	Best Female Vocalist of the Year	Won
2003	Most Popular Female Vocalist of the Year	Won
2004	Best Selling Stereo Album of the Year	Won
2004	Most Popular Female Vocalist of the Year	Won
2005	Most Popular Female Vocalist of the Year	Won
