= List of Burmese actors =

The following is a list of Burmese actors.

== Actors ==
=== A ===
- Aung Lwin
- A Linn Yaung
- Aung Min Khant
- Aung Yay Chan

=== D ===
- Dwe
- Daung

=== H ===
- Hein Htet

=== K ===
- Kyaw Hein
- Kyaw Swe
- Khin Maung Yin
- Kyaw Thu
- Kyaw Ye Aung
- Khar Ra
- Kyaw Htet Zaw
- Kyaw Htet Aung
- Kaung Myat San
- Kyaw Hsu
- Khin Hlaing
- Ko ko oo

=== L ===
- Lu min
- Lwin Moe
- Lin Aung Khit

=== M ===
- Moe Aung Yin
- Myint Aung
- Min Maw Kun
- Myint Myat
- Min Thway

=== N ===
- Nay Htoo Naing
- Nay Toe
- Nyi Pu
- Nyein Thaw
- Nat Khat

=== O ===
- Okkar Min Maung

=== P ===
- Po Par Gyi
- Pyay Ti Oo
- Paing Takhon

=== S ===
- Sai Sai Kham Leng
- Shin Mwe La
- Shwe Htoo
- Shwe Yoe
- Soe Thu
- Si Phyo
- Si Thu Win

=== T ===
- Thu Maung
- Tyron Bejay
- Tun Tun

=== W ===
- Wai Lu Kyaw
- Win Oo

=== Y ===
- Yaza Ne Win
- Ye Lay
- Yan Aung

=== Z ===
- Zaganar
- Zaw One
- Zeya
- Zwe Pyae
- Zin Wine

== Actresses ==
=== A ===
- Aye Myat Thu
- Aye Wutyi Thaung
- Aye Mya Phyu

=== C ===
- Chit Thu Wai
- Cho Pyone
- Chue Lay
- Chaw Yadanar

=== E ===
- Eaindra Kyaw Zin
- Ei Chaw Po

=== H ===
- Htun Eaindra Bo
- Htet Htet Moe Oo
- Hsaung Wutyee May
- Htar Htet Htet

=== K ===
- Khin Than Nu
- Khin Yu May
- Kyi Kyi Htay
- Khine Thin Kyi
- Khine Hnin Wai
- Khin Wint Wah
- Khay Sett Thwin
- Khin Moht Moht Aye
- Khin Zarchi Kyaw

=== M ===
- May
- May Myat Noe
- May Shin
- May May Win
- May Sweet
- May Win Maung
- Melody
- Moh Moh Myint Aung
- Moe Yu San
- Myint Myint Khin
- May Than Nu
- May Thet Khine
- May Toe Khine
- May Myint Mo
- Mya Hnin Yee Lwin
- May Mi Ko Ko
- Mone
- Myat Thu Thu
- Moe Hay Ko

=== N ===
- Nandar Hlaing
- Nay Chi Oo
- Nan Sandar Hla Htun
- Nay Chi Shoon Lak
- Nansu Yati Soe

=== P ===
- Phway Phway
- Paing Phyo Thu
- Pyae Pyae
- Poe Kyar Phyu Khin
- Poe Ei Ei Khant

=== S ===
- Soe Myat Thuzar
- Soe Myat Nandar
- Su Pan Htwar
- Su Shun Lae
- Soe Pyae Thazin
- Shwe Hmone Yati
- Shwe Thamee

=== T ===
- Thet Mon Myint
- Thandar Bo
- Thinzar Wint Kyaw
- Than Thar Moe Theint
- Thun Sett

=== W ===
- Wah Wah Win Shwe
- Wutt Hmone Shwe Yi
- Wyne Su Khine Thein
- Wint Yamone Naing

=== Y ===
- Yoon Yoon
- Yu Thandar Tin
- Yadanar My
- Yadanar Bo
- Yadanar Phyu Phyu Aung
