= Mahar (TV channel) =

Burmese television channel

Mahar HD မဟာရုပ်သံလိုင်း
- Broadcast area: Myanmar
- Headquarters: Yangon

Programming
- Language: Burmese
- Picture format: 1080i HDTV

Ownership
- Owner: ABC Content Solutions Co., Ltd
- Sister channels: Mahar Esports HD

History
- Launched: 30 October 2016; 10 years ago

Links
- Website: www.mahar.app

Availability

Terrestrial
- MRTV Multiplex 2 (Myanmar): Channel 8 (HD); RF Channel 35 586 MHz
- Thaicom 6 KU (Thailand): 12728 V 30000 (HD)
- Intelsat 39 (Myanmar): 11137 V 30000 (HD)
- Softtech M1 (Myanmar): Channel 18 (SD)
- GMM Z (Thailand): Channel 101 (HD) (KU-Band)
- Infosat (Thailand): Channel 101 (HD) (KU-Band)

Streaming media
- Mahar Mobile: channel 1 (HD)

Mahar (Burmese: မဟာရုပ်သံလိုင်း) is a Burmese free-to-air television channel. Launched on 30 October 2016. The main purpose of the great near or distant Burmese are perfect, real-time knowledge of the sector in order to view the free Burma wellness genre and given presentations in one place. Mahar had signed a cooperation agreement with state-run Myanmar Radio and Television (MRTV) to operate as content providers for digital free-to-air Television channels in a multi-playout system of MRTV on 6 September 2023.

== Programming ==
Year	English name	Original Name (Burmese)	Cast
2022	Bad Daughter	သမီးဆိုး	Tyron Bejay, Aye Chan Maung, Nyi Nanda, Yadanar Bo, Htet Htet Htun, Myo Sandi Kyaw, August Moe, Wah Wah Aung
2023	The Marriage	အိမ်ထောင်	Kyaw Htet Aung, Nyi Htut Khaung, Banyar Phone Pyae, Chaw Yadanar, Yadanar Bo, Htet Htet Htun, May Toe Khine, Thin Thae Bo
2023	Ah Mone	အမုန်း	Chan Min Ye Htut, Moe Hay Ko, Khin Wint Wah, Min Oo, Nyi Nanda, Khin Zarchi Kyaw, Moe Pwint Phyu, Thonedray Oo
2023	Laung	လောင်	Tyron Bejay, Htet Htet Htun, Chaw Yadanar, Nyi Htut Khaung, Phoo Sone, Hsu Eaint San, Shein Tin Htoo, August Moe
2024	Ku Htone Mae Chit Chin	ကုထုံးမဲ့ချစ်ခြင်း	Aung Min Khant, Yadanar Bo, Tay Za Lin Yaung, May Mi Kyaw Kyaw, Snow Kyi Phyu, Phyu Thae Oo, Zaw Oo
2024	Yin Thway	ရင်သွေး	Ye Aung, Nyi Nanda, Nyi Htut Khaung, Htet Aung Shine, Banyar Phone Pyae, Wai Phyo, Khine Hnin Wai, Phoo Sone, Shwe Thamee, Thun Sett, Yadanar Bo
2025	I'm Queen	ငါဘုရင်မ	A Linn Yaung, Khin Wint Wah, Htet Htet Htun

== Availability ==
Terrestrial
MRTV Multiplex 2	Channel 8 (HD); RF Channel 35 586 MHz
Satellite
Softtech Myanmar	Channel 18 (HD)
Thaicom 6 78.5°E	12728 V 30000 (HD)
Intelsat 39 62°E	11137 V 30000 (HD)
