= Yadanar Bo =

Burmese actress, model

- ရတနာဗိုလ်
- Born: Yadanar Bo; 15 November 1993 (age 32); Mandalay, Myanmar
- Occupations: Actress, model

Yadanar Bo (Burmese: ရတနာဗိုလ်) is a Burmese academy award winning actress and model. She is known for her attractive natural beauty and acting skills. Throughout her career, she has acted in over 50 films.

== Career ==
She made her big-screen debut with CO_{2} where she played the main role with actors A Linn Yaung, Kyaw Htet Aung and Phway Phway which screened in Myanmar cinemas on July 27, 2018. The same year, she took on her big-screen main role in the film "What does the sea say" alongside Min Maw Kun, Khant Si Thu, Tun Tun (Examplez), Soe Myat Thuzar, Thandar Bo and Ei Chaw Po.

== Political activities ==
Following the 2021 Myanmar coup d'état, Yadanar Bo was active in the anti-coup movement both in person at rallies and through social media. Denouncing the military coup, she has taken part in protests since February. She joined the "We Want Justice" three-finger salute movement. The movement was launched on social media, and many celebrities have joined the movement.

On 8 April 2021, warrants for her arrest were issued under section 505 (a) of the penal code by the State Administration Council for speaking out against the military coup. Along with several other celebrities, she was charged with calling for participation in the Civil Disobedience Movement (CDM) and damaging the state's ability to govern, with supporting the Committee Representing Pyidaungsu Hluttaw, and with generally inciting the people to disturb the peace and stability of the nation.

== Filmography ==
=== Film (Cinema) ===
- 1014 (film) (2019)
- CO_{2} (ကာဗွန်ဒိုင်အောက်ဆိုဒ်) (2018).
- What does the sea say? (ပင်လယ်ကြီးကဘာပြောလဲ)
- Baw Si (ဘောစိ)
- Thu Chit Khin (သူချစ်ခင်) (2024)
- Pyu Sarr (ပြုစား) (2025)
- The Dark Wedding (ညမင်္ဂလာ) (2025)
- I Want to Be Your Queen (မောင့်မိဖုရား) (2025)
- Super Lady (စူပါလေဒီ) (2025)
- A Nhit (အနှစ်) (2025)
- Chauk Chauk Kyan Kyan (ခြောက်ခြောက်ကြမ်းကြမ်း) (2026)
- Michelle (မီချယ်) (2026)
- Pa Hta Ma Lyn (ပထမလင်) (2026)

=== Film ===
List of films
| Year | Romanized Title | Burmese Title | Director | Co-Stars | Role |
|---|---|---|---|---|---|
| | Say a kyi kyi htoe | ဆေးအကြီးကြီးထိုး | | Khant Si Thu | |
| | Achit eain lay | အချစ်အိမ်လေး | | Zay Ye Htet | |
| | Kyon taw pyaw yin lwal khae tal | | | Khant Si Thu | |
| | Than khaung yan | သန်းခေါင်ယံ | | Myint Myat | |
| 2020 | Arr nae chat ka chit tat tal | အားနည်းချက်က ချစ်တက်တယ် | | Phyo Ngwe Soe, Pyay Ti Oo, Khin Wint Wah | |
| 2023 | Kyon tot ama ma kyar nyo | ကျွန်တော့်အမ မကြာညို | | Zay Ye Htet, Khine Hnin Wai | |
| 2025 | Nyhoet Say | ညှို့ဆေး | Pyae Phyo Naing | Shein Tin Htoo, Dipar Kyaw, Khine Hsu | Padamyar Khin |

=== Television series ===
Lists of Series
| Year | Series | Original name | Director | Co-Stars | Role | Channel | Note |
|---|---|---|---|---|---|---|---|
| 2017 | Yadanabon | ရတနာပုံ | Thar Nyi | Hein Wai Yan, Moe Yan Zun, Htun Ko Ko, Aye Wutyi Thaung, Zun Than Sin | Nay Yee | Myanmar National TV | |
| 2022 | Night Hidden Flower | ညဝှက်ပန်း | Thein Han (Phoenix) | Kyaw Htet Aung, Thoon Thet Htoo San | | Mahar | |
| 2022 | Bad Daughter | သမီးဆိုး | Mae Min Bon | Tyron Bejay, Aye Chan Maung, Htet Htet Htun, August Moe | Chan Mya Cho | Mahar | |
| 2022–23 | Crying Forest | အိပ်မက်ငိုတော | Kaung Zan | Aung Min Khant, Naw Phaw Eh Htar, Shinn Myat, Shein Tin Htoo, Htut Myat Shwe Yi | Yati | Canal+ Zat Lenn | |
| 2023 | Ta Khar Mike | တစ်ခါမိုက် | Aung Zaw Lin | Hein Wai Yan, Min Oo, Aung Lay, Khine Hnin Wai, Chaw Kalyar, Ella Shwe Sin | Yu | Channel K | |
| 2023 | The Marriage | အိမ်ထောင် | Mae Min Bon | Kyaw Htet Aung, Nyi Htut Khaung, Banyar Phone Pyae, Chaw Yadanar, Htet Htet Htun, May Toe Khine, Thin Thae Bo | Thu Chit Khin | Mahar | |
| 2024 | Ku Htone Mae Chit Chin | ကုထုံးမဲ့ချစ်ခြင်း | Thar Gyi | Aung Min Khant, Tayza Lin Young , May Mi Kyaw Kyaw, Snow Kyi Phyu, Phyu Thae Oo, Zaw Oo | Thet Htar San | Mahar | |
| 2024 | The Offspring | ရင်သွေး | Mae Min Bon | Ye Aung, Nyi Nanda, Nyi Htut Khaung, Htet Aung Shine, Banyar Phone Pyae, Wai Phyo, Khine Hnin Wai, Phoo Sone, Shwe Thamee, Thun Sett | Mani Sit | Mahar | |
| 2026 | Let Twel Phaw | လက်တွဲဖော် | Pwint Theingi Zaw | Shein Tin Htoo, Thu Riya, Ye Lwin Oo, Hnin Yu, Goon Pone Gyi, Min Thway Shan | Akari Khoon Nyo | MRTV-4 | |
