= Linka =

Linka may refer to:

- Linka (skipper), a genus of butterfly
- Lake Linka, a lake in Minnesota
- Linn-Kristin Riegelhuth Koren or Linka (born 1984), athlete
- Linka (festival), a Tibetan event during which Lhamo is held
- Linka (fl. 1571), Pogesanian leader who participated in the Prussian uprisings

== People with the name ==
- Jiří Ignác Linek or Jiří Ignác Linka (1725–1791), Czech composer
- Paweł Linka (born 1986), Polish footballer
- Alois Linka, runner for Czechoslovakia at the 1924 Summer Olympics
- Bernarda Linka, a historical figure documented by Gabriela Dudeková
- Peter Linka, actor who portrays Mile Valstoria in the video game Sniper 2
- Wendy Linka, former girlfriend and fundraiser for Willie Brown
- Línka Gékova Gérgova, a contributor to the music of Bulgaria
- Linka Lowczynski, mother of Christine Niederberger
- Lesli Linka Glatter (born 1953), actress

=== Fictional ===
- Linka Karensky, a character played by Elke Sommer in The Wrecking Crew
- Linka, the Soviet Planeteer of wind from Captain Planet and the Planeteers
- Linka Loud, gender-bent dream version of Lincoln from The Loud House

== See also ==
- Israel Galerie Linka, a book featuring Yitzhak Frenkel
- La Min A Linka A Nyeint, a movie starring Su Shun Lai
- Linka Detskej Istoty, the Slovak Republic's UNICEF effort in Missing Children Europe
