= Chaw Yadanar =

Burmese actress

- ချောရတနာ
- Born: 29 September 1980 (age 45); Rangoon, Burma (now Yangon, Myanmar)
- Education: Dagon University
- Occupation: Actress
- Height: 5 ft 9 in (1.75 m)
- Partner: Kyaw Lin (m. 2002)
- Awards: Myanmar Academy Award (Best Supporting Actress for 2012)

Chaw Yadanar (Burmese: ချောရတနာ; born 29 September 1980) is a Myanmar Academy Award winning Burmese actress. She won her first Myanmar Academy Award for Best Supporting Actress in 2012 with the film Egg.

Throughout her career, she has acted in over 170 films.

== Early life and education ==
Yadanar was born on 29 September 1983 in Yangon, Myanmar. Her younger sister, Thandar Bo is also an actress. She graduated from Dagon University.

== Career ==
In 2014, she played the leading role in the Burmese big screen film 39 Bite Puu movie with actor Nay Toe, Wai Lu Kyaw, Ye Aung and actress Soe Myat Thuzar, Wutt Hmone Shwe Yi.

=== 2012–2013: Film and recognition ===
In 2012, Chaw Yadanar won the 2012 Myanmar Academy Award, playing in the movie Egg, alongside Khant Si Thu, Kyaw Ye Aung, Soe Myat Nandar, Soe Myat Thuzar, Thinzar Wint Kyaw and Tun Tun (actor).

== Selected filmography ==
=== Film ===
Over 170 films, including

Year	Film	Co-Stars	Note
	Ko thar kyaw yae achit pone pyin	Nay Htoo Naing	
	Tha mee lo chin amay kyi	Aung Ye Lin	
	Yin bat htae ka late pyar	Aung Ye Lin	
	Chit tae thu lat nyoe htaung	Lu Min (actor), Eaindra Kyaw Zin, Moe Pyae Pyae Mg	
	Kabaroo ka tae ka	Aung Ye Lin, Thet Mon Myint	
	Chit sate yay	Pyay Ti Oo, Soe Myat Thuzar	
2012	Egg	Kyaw Ye Aung, Soe Myat Nandar	Best Supporting Award
2026	Yite Pauk (ရိုက်ပေါက်)	Shin Mwe La, Chue Lay, Hsaung Wutyee May, Kaung Myat San, Hlwan Paing	
2026	Michelle (မီချယ်)	San Htate Htar Oo, Nay Toe, Yadanar Bo, Hsu Eaint San, Cho Pyone	Role: May Cho

=== Television series ===
Lists of Series
Year	Series	Director	Co-Stars	Role	Channel	Note
2022	Dreamed A Dream	Pyae Phyo Naing	Banyar Phone Pyae, Phone Shan, Shwe Yin Aye, Thazin Htoo Myint		Channel K	
2022	Mone Tine Athinchay	Nay Paing	Kyaw Htet Aung, Cindy Myat		Channel K	
2022	Two of Us BFF		Phone Theik, Nyi Nyi Maung		Fortune TV	
2023	The Marriage	Mae Min Bon	Kyaw Htet Aung, Nyi Htut Khaung, Banyar Phone Pyae, Htet Htet Htun, Yadanar Bo, May Toe Khine, Thin Thae Bo	Dr. Mya Dawi Kyaw	Mahar	
2023	Laung	Mae Min Bon	Tyron Bejay, Htet Htet Htun, Nyi Htut Khaung, Phoo Sone, Hsu Eaint San, Shein Tin Htoo, August Moe	Moe Hti Chay	Mahar	
2026	Myittar Lay Nyin Thin Say Thar	Ko Ko Win	Kyaw Htet Zaw, Bhone Min Nayla, Yamone Myint Myat, Wa Wa Aung, Saw La Pyae Won, Nay Won, Hmuu Thiha Thu, Thin Kha Thu, Htet Htet Lin Lett	Khin Myat Thu	MRTV-4	

== Awards and nominations ==
Year	Award	Category	Nominated work	Result
2008	Myanmar Academy Award	Best Supporting Actress	Academy Shot	Nominated
2012	Myanmar Academy Award	Best Supporting Actress	Egg	Won

== Personal life ==
In 2002, she married Kyaw Lin. They have one son and one daughter.
