= Tu Hnine Ma Ya Tae Myittar =

2021 Burmese television series

- Poster
- Burmese: တုနှိုင်းမရတဲ့မေတ္တာ
- Genre: Drama
- Screenplay by: Nay Chi Aung Thit
- Directed by: Zabyu Htun Thet Lwin
- Starring: Yan Aung; Min Thu; Nay Dway; Sit Naing; Aye Chan Maung; Ei Si Kway; Min Khant Nyi; Kaung Sett Htoo; Khine Hnin Wai; Poe Ei Ei Khant; Nan Shwe Yi; Khin Thazin; Saung Yoon San; Hnin Oo Wai; Ei Shoon Madi Moe; Soe Moe Kyi; War War Aung
- Country of origin: Myanmar
- Original language: Burmese
- No. of episodes: 29

Production
- Executive producer: U Khin Saing
- Production location: Myanmar
- Editor: Hnin Nwe Win
- Running time: 40 minutes Mondays to Fridays at 19:00 (MMT)
- Production company: Kyaung Kabar Production

Original release
- Network: MRTV-4
- Release: March 8 – April 15, 2021

Tu Hnine Ma Ya Tae Myittar (Burmese: တုနှိုင်းမရတဲ့မေတ္တာ) is a 2021 Burmese drama television series. It aired on MRTV-4, from March 8 to April 15, 2021, on Mondays to Fridays at 19:00 for 29 episodes.

== Cast ==
- Yan Aung as Uncle Lay
- Min Thu as Sit Min
- Nay Dway as Wai Yan Oo
- Sit Naing as Shine Htet Naung
- Aye Chan Maung as Dr. Zwe La Min
- Ei Si Kway as Myint Mo, Pu Too
- Min Khant Nyi as Thar Cho
- Kaung Sett Htoo as U Min Lwin
- Khine Hnin Wai as Mon Mon Kyaw
- Poe Ei Ei Khant as Pont Pont
- Nan Shwe Yi as Su Hnin Pwint
- Khin Thazin as Daw Ami Htun
- Saung Yoon San as Wai Mon Oo
- Hnin Oo Wai as Ei Mon Min
- Ei Shoon Madi Moe as Daw Yu Ya Nwe
- Soe Moe Kyi as Daw Cho
- War War Aung as Daw Thuzar
- Aung Khine as U Wai Lin
- Aung Zaw Min as U Phoe Toke

== See also ==
- Kyee Myat Thaw Martar
