= The Marriage (Burmese TV series) =

2023 Burmese television series

- Poster
- Burmese: အိမ်ထောင်
- Genre: Drama
- Created by: Mahar
- Based on: The Poisoned Sea by Lone Ma
- Developed by: Mae Min Bon
- Screenplay by: The Land
- Story by: Lu Nyo Chaw; Lone Ma
- Directed by: Mae Min Bon
- Starring: Kyaw Htet Aung; Nyi Htut Khaung; Banyar Phone Pyae; Chaw Yadanar; Yadanar Bo; Htet Htet Htun; May Toe Khine; Thin Thae Bo
- Opening theme: "The Marriage" by Aung Myint Myat and May Yee Win
- Ending theme: "The Marriage" by Aung Myint Myat and May Yee Win
- Composer: Aung Myint Myat
- Country of origin: Myanmar
- Original language: Burmese
- No. of episodes: 25

Production
- Production location: Myanmar
- Cinematography: Soe Thiha Htay
- Editors: Ye Thiha (Heart to Heart); Aung Thuya Kyaw; Lin Lin Zaw
- Running time: 50 minutes
- Production company: Aung Thiri Film Production

Original release
- Network: Mahar
- Release: 23 April – 26 May 2023

The Marriage (Burmese: အိမ်ထောင်) is a 2023 Burmese drama television series directed by Mae Min Bon starring Kyaw Htet Aung, Nyi Htut Khaung, Banyar Phone Pyae, Chaw Yadanar, Yadanar Bo, Htet Htet Htun, May Toe Khine and Thin Thae Bo. It was produced by Aung Thiri Film Production, edited by Ye Thiha (Heart to Heart) and theme song composed by Aung Myint Myat. It was based on the novel "The Poisoned Sea" by Lone Ma. It aired on Mahar App, from April 23 to May 26, 2023.

It also aired on Mahar TV channel, from May 11 to June 14, 2023, on Mondays to Fridays at 18:00 (MMT).

The press show of the series was held on April 24, 2023 at Novotel Hotel, Yangon.

It was also included some real events. The incident caused a stir among the fans. It is also becoming more popular on social media like Facebook, YouTube and TikTok. According to social media, most of the girls who were watching this series don't trust their husband anymore, and like in the series, they thought that their husbands would also adultery with other girls.

== Synopsis ==
Mya Devi Kyaw (Chaw Yadanar) has a husband Eant Htoo Htet (Kyaw Htet Aung) and Khin Thidar (Htet Htet Htun) also has a husband Lin Nyoe (Nyi Htut Khaung). Mya Devi Kyaw and Khin Thida are both doctors, earn well and have happy families. The main villain of the series is Thu Chit Khin (Yadanar Bo). She messed with men. She messed with the manager of the shop where she worked. She also messed with a married man and his wife came to the shop and went on a rampage then she got fired. Her aunt, Daw Moe (Myo Myo Khine) is the one pulling the strings for her. But she is also hoping for someone's appreciation and love. One day, Dr. Mya helped her to abort an accidental pregnancy, and she became close to Dr. Mya. She was so thankful and went to Dr. Mya's house to show her gratitude and became acquainted with the whole family, especially Dr. Mya’s husband and crossed the line. Through that, she started a love story with Dr. Mya's husband, Eant Htoo Htet. Dr. Mya found out that her husband was adultery with Thu Chit Khin and tried to stop him, but when she couldn't, she committed suicide by drinking poison. Khin Thidar also found out that her husband, Lin Nyoe was having an affair with a girl named Shwe (Thin Thae Bo). Her husband blames Khin Thidar for adultery because she can't have a child. Khin Thidar did not forgive her husband and divorced him. Later, Thu Chit Khin also seduced Eant Htoo Htet's son Aw Ra Htoo (Banyar Phone Pyae). Aw Ra Htoo had a girlfriend named Poe Ei Seint (May Toe Khine), but he was attracted to Thu Chit Khin. Finally, when Eant Htoo Htet couldn't separate his son and Thu Chit Khin, he stabbed Thu Chit Khin to death and went to prison.

== Cast ==
- Kyaw Htet Aung as Eant Htoo Htet
- Nyi Htut Khaung as Lin Nyoe
- Banyar Phone Pyae as Aw Ra Htoo
- Chaw Yadanar as Dr. Mya Devi Kyaw
- Yadanar Bo as Thu Chit Khin
- Htet Htet Htun as Dr. Khin Thidar
- May Toe Khine as Poe Ei Seint
- Thin Thae Bo as Shwe
- Daung Wai as U Kaung Kha, father of Poe Ei Seint
- Mar Yu Thar as Daw Thandar, mother of Poe Ei Seint
- Zaw Oo as U Thurein, father of Eant Htoo Htet
- Myo Myo Khine as Daw Moe, aunt of Thu Chit Khin
- Khin Than Win as Daw Hla, mother of Eant Htoo Htet
