= Puyi Tha =

2018 Burmese film

- Film Poster
- Burmese: ပုရိသ
- Directed by: Ko Zaw (Ar Yone Oo)
- Screenplay by: Min Ko Soe
- Story by: Pan Chi Shwe Aye Ko
- Starring: Khine Thin Kyi; Nay Chi Oo; Kyaw Ye Aung; Ye Aung; Chan Min Ye Htut; Khin Hlaing; Tyron Bejay; Htet Aung Shine; Aye Chan Maung
- Production company: Sein Htay Film Production
- Release date: August 8, 2019
- Running time: 120 minutes
- Country: Myanmar
- Language: Burmese

Puyi Tha (Burmese: ပုရိသ) is a 2019 Burmese comedy film, directed by Ko Zaw (Ar Yone Oo) starring Khine Thin Kyi, Nay Chi Oo, Kyaw Ye Aung, Ye Aung, Chan Min Ye Htut, Khin Hlaing, Tyron Bejay, Htet Aung Shine and Aye Chan Maung. The film, produced by Sein Htay Film Production premiered Myanmar on August 8, 2019.

== Cast ==
- Khine Thin Kyi as Htet Myint Mo
- Nay Chi Oo as Kaung Kin Pyar
- Kyaw Ye Aung as U Arkar
- Khin Hlaing as Mommy Hlaing
- Ye Aung
- Chan Min Ye Htut
- Tyron Bejay
- Htet Aung Shine
- Aye Chan Maung
