= I'm Queen =

2025 Burmese television series

- Poster
- Burmese: ငါဘုရင်မ
- Genre: Drama
- Created by: Mahar
- Based on: I'm Queen by Shin Ma
- Screenplay by: Ngwe Zin Thun; Thin Nant Thar; Nya Hmway Pann
- Directed by: Wyne
- Starring: A Linn Yaung; Khin Wint Wah; Htet Htet Htun
- Music by: Z Team
- Ending theme: "I'm Queen" by Lain Maw Thee
- Composer: Kaung Chit Thu
- Country of origin: Myanmar
- Original language: Burmese
- No. of episodes: 22

Production
- Executive producer: Pyone Pyone Kyi
- Production location: Myanmar
- Cinematography: Kyauk Phyu (Padaythar)
- Editor: Kyaw Khaing Soe
- Running time: 50 minutes
- Production company: Mahar

Original release
- Network: Mahar
- Release: 15 July – 13 August 2025

I'm Queen (Burmese: ငါဘုရင်မ) is a 2025 Burmese drama television series directed by Wyne starring A Linn Yaung, Khin Wint Wah and Htet Htet Htun. It was produced by Mahar, edited by Kyaw Khaing Soe and theme song composed by Kaung Chit Thu.

It aired on Mahar App, on Mondays to Fridays at 07:00 and on Mahar TV channel, on Mondays to Fridays at 18:00 (MMT), from July 15 to August 13, 2025.

The press show of the series was held on July 13, 2025 at the Novotel Hotel, Yangon.

== Synopsis ==
Baydar Phyu has a child, and her husband has left her for another woman. One day, Thurein Ko enters in Baydar Phyu’s neighborhood for some construction-related work. He happens to see Baydar Phyu unexpectedly and becomes interested in her the moment he lays eyes on her. Meanwhile, Myat Akari also develops an interest in Thurein Ko upon seeing him. Realizing that Thurein Ko is interested in Bayda Phyu, Myat Akari begins to interfere and cause trouble in various ways. One day, in a tragic turn of events, Myat Akari accidentally hits Baydar Phyu’s young daughter with her car, resulting in the child's death. Thurein Ko finds himself forced to marry Myat Akari to protect his father’s reputation, given the nature of the relationship between his father and Myat Akari. Furthermore, Baydar Phyu is compelled to work at Myat Akari’s household to earn money to reclaim her home—a property she stands to lose because of her stepfather. Baydar Phyu endures mistreatment from Myat Akari; she cannot simply quit her job because she had taken an advance on her salary to pay for the recovery of her house. Eventually, Thurein Ko discovers the situation and secures Baydar Phyu’s release by paying three times the amount of the salary advance she had taken. Afterward, Thurein Ko hires Baydar Phyu to work at a beauty salon that he owns. As time passed, Baydar Phyu stopped tolerating Myat Akari’s behavior and began to retaliate with calculated moves. Thurein Ko, who had long been attempting to divorce Myat Akari, finally succeeded and drove both her and her mother out of the house. Myat Akari and his mother relocated to a poor neighborhood. Meanwhile, Baydar Phyu also departed from Thurein Ko’s house. In the final scene, Thurein Ko and Baydar Phyu reunite at the very place where they first met, bringing the story to its conclusion.

== Cast ==
- A Linn Yaung as Thurein Ko
- Khin Wint Wah as Baydar Phyu
- Htet Htet Htun as Myat Akari
- Min Oo as U Ko Ko
- Wai Phyo as Min Naing
- Cindy Myat as Yu Wadi
- Hein Thit Sa as Lin Myat Zaw
- Htoo Naing Lin as Aung Kyi Soe
- Cho Madi Thwin as Ohnmar
- Ye Yint Sithu Aung as Tay Zar
- Soe Moe Kyi as Daw Mar Lar Khaing
- Hnin Wutyi Kyaw as Nway Oo
- Kyaw Zay Ya as U Win Maung
- Khin Moht Moht Aye as Daw May Soe Oo
- Than Than Soe as Daw Thidar Aye
- Shin Min Eain (child actress) as Thazin Min
