= Kyee Myat Thaw Martar =

2020 Burmese television series

- Poster
- Burmese: ကြီးမြတ်သောမာတာ
- Genre: Drama
- Screenplay by: Nay Chi Aung Thit
- Story by: Kyaung Kabar
- Directed by: Zabyu Htun Thet Lwin
- Starring: Ye Aung; Moht Moht Myint Aung; Aye Chan Maung; Nan Shwe Yi; Kaung Sett Htoo; Soe Moe Kyi; Khin Thazin; Ei Shoon Madi Moe
- Country of origin: Myanmar
- Original language: Burmese
- No. of episodes: 28

Production
- Executive producer: U Khin Saing
- Production location: Myanmar
- Editor: Hnin Nwe Win
- Running time: 40 minutes Mondays to Fridays at 20:45 (MMT)
- Production company: Kyaung Kabar Production

Original release
- Network: MRTV-4
- Release: January 6 – February 12, 2020

Kyee Myat Thaw Martar (Burmese: ကြီးမြတ်သောမာတာ) is a 2020 Burmese drama television series. It aired on MRTV-4, from January 6 to February 12, 2020, on Mondays to Fridays at 20:45 for 28 episodes.

== Cast ==
- Ye Aung as U Ye Oo
- Moht Moht Myint Aung as Daw Hnin May
- Aye Chan Maung as Dr. Ye Yint
- Nan Shwe Yi as Poe Nge
- Kaung Sett Htoo as Min Lwin
- Soe Moe Kyi as Daw Cho
- Khin Thazin as Ami Htun
- Ei Shoon Madi Moe as Yu Ya Nwe
- Aung Zaw Min as Phoe Toke

== See also ==
- Tu Hnine Ma Ya Tae Myittar
