= Laung =

2023 Burmese television series

- Poster
- Burmese: လောင်
- Genre: Drama
- Created by: Mahar
- Developed by: Mae Min Bone
- Screenplay by: The Land
- Story by: Lu Nyo Chaw; Lone Ma
- Directed by: Mae Min Bone
- Starring: Tyron Bejay; Htet Htet Htun; Chaw Yadanar; Nyi Htut Khaung; Phoo Sone; Hsu Eaint San; Shein Tin Htoo; August Moe; Wah Wah Aung; Myo Myo Khine
- Opening theme: "Laung" by Aung Myint Myat and May Yee Win
- Ending theme: "Laung" by Aung Myint Myat and May Yee Win
- Composer: Aung Myint Myat
- Country of origin: Myanmar
- Original language: Burmese
- No. of episodes: 26

Production
- Production location: Myanmar
- Cinematography: Soe Thiha Htay
- Editors: Aung Thura Kyaw; Lin Lin Zaw; Min Pyae Thiha
- Running time: 50 minutes
- Production company: Aung Thiri Film Production

Original release
- Network: Mahar App
- Release: 27 August – 30 September 2023

Laung (Burmese: လောင်, lit. 'Burn') is a 2023 Burmese drama television series directed by Mae Min Bone starring Tyron Bejay, Htet Htet Htun, Chaw Yadanar, Nyi Htut Khaung, Phoo Sone, Hsu Eaint San, Shein Tin Htoo, August Moe, Wah Wah Aung and Myo Myo Khine. It aired on Mahar App, from August 27 to September 30, 2023.

It also aired on Mahar TV channel, from August 29 to October 3, 2023, on Mondays to Fridays at 18:00 (MMT).

The press show of the series was held on August 26, 2023, at Novotel Hotel, Yangon.

== Synopsis ==
Aye Mya Nyein followed Khun Zai with jewelry and money. This was arranged by Khun Zai at the request of Moe Hti Chay's daughter Moe. Her father U Thatoe Kyaw and mother Daw May Nyein tried to separate her from Khun Zai, but Aye Mya Nyein stayed with him because she loved him. Khun Zai and his mother, Daw Cho Cho Myint, tortured Aye Mya Nyein and cried every day. On the other hand, Aye Mya Nyein's younger brother, Thukha Kyaw married Moe. One day Moe Hti Chay came to U Thatoe Kyaw house and began to retell the previous stories. Previously, U Thatoe Kyaw and Moe Hti Chay were involved, and they broke up because their attitudes did not match. Moe thought she was U Thatoe Kyaw's daughter, but later found out that she was not Moe Hti Chay's biological daughter. Actually, the daughter of Moe Hti Chay is Mee Chit. In the past, the father of Moe Hti Chay tried to get rid of Thatoe Kyaw's baby, Mee Chit, but she was adopted by Daw Mhwe. And Moe became a kind and understanding person. However, she didn't want to do what her mother asked her to do but she did it, so she was hated by Thukha Kyaw. Another problem is that Aye Mya Nyein is not the biological daughter of Thatoe Kyaw. Thatoe Kyaw and others knew that Aye Mya Nyein was U Htun Khin's daughter. After that, the cool person Aye Mya Nyein became mature. U Htun Khin also retreated as a father who could not do anything. Aye Mya Nyein decided not to stay with the abusive husband. Moe and Thukha Kyaw also settled thanks to U Thatoe Kyaw's advice. Then, through Daw Mhwe's telling, Moe Hti Chay found out that Mee Chit was her biological daughter, but Mee Chit had already died. Thatoe Kyaw also found out that Mee Chit was his biological daughter, and felt that he was mad and heartbroken. Thato Kyaw was also imprisoned for his involvement in the death of Mee Chit. Aye Mya Nyein went and worshiped her biological father who was in the cool and peaceful shade of the Buddha. Khun Zai also became a clever man. Moe Hti Chay couldn't accept that her daughter died and went crazy. Thatoe Kyaw also felt remorse in prison for causing his daughter to die.

== Cast ==
- Tyron Bejay as Khun Zai
- Htet Htet Htun as Aye Mya Nyein
- Chaw Yadanar as Moe Hti Chay
- Nyi Htut Khaung as Thatoe Kyaw
- Phoo Sone as May Nyein
- Hsu Eaint San as Mee Chit
- Shein Tin Htoo as Thukha Kyaw
- August Moe as Moe
- Wah Wah Aung as Daw Cho Cho Myint
- Myo Myo Khine as Daw Mhwe
- Kyaw Zay Ya as U Htun Khin
