= Ku Htone Mae Chit Chin =

2024 Burmese television series

- Poster
- Burmese: ကုထုံးမဲ့ချစ်ခြင်း
- Genre: Drama
- Screenplay by: Hay Man Hein; Yee Mon Htet
- Story by: Hay Man Hein; Yee Mon Htet
- Directed by: Thar Gyi
- Starring: Aung Min Khant; Yadanar Bo; Tayza Lin Young; May Mi Kyaw Kyaw; Snow Kyi Phyu; Phyu Thae Oo; Zaw Oo
- Opening theme: "A Chit Ma Thi A Mone Ma Shi" by Su Hlaing and Khine Noe
- Ending theme: "A Chit Ma Thi A Mone Ma Shi" by Su Hlaing and Khine Noe
- Composer: Khine Noe
- Country of origin: Myanmar
- Original language: Burmese
- No. of episodes: 16

Production
- Producer: Pyone Pyone Kyi
- Cinematography: Pyae Phyo Wai Kyaw
- Editors: Yoon Yoon San; Than Htun Win; Htet Zaw
- Running time: 40 minutes

Original release
- Network: Mahar App
- Release: February 7 – February 28, 2024

Ku Htone Mae Chit Chin (Burmese: ကုထုံးမဲ့ချစ်ခြင်း) is a 2024 Burmese drama television series directed by Thar Gyi starring Aung Min Khant, Yadanar Bo, Tayza Lin Young, May Mi Kyaw Kyaw, Snow Kyi Phyu and Phyu Thae Oo. It was produced by Pyone Pyone Kyi and edited by Yoon Yoon San, Than Htun Win and Htet Zaw. It aired on Mahar App, from February 7 to 28, 2024.

It also aired on Mahar TV channel, from February 9, to March 1, 2024, on Mondays to Fridays at 18:00.

== Synopsis ==
Dr. Khet Man is married to Thet Htar San and is very dominant over her wife. Khin Thiri Naing, the owner of Thiri hospital, is also married to a boy named Zwe who is younger than her. They are a very loving couple. July is Dr. Khet Man's nurse assistant, and she is interested in Dr. Khet Man knowing that he has a wife. Sharr is also a girl but she is not interested in boys and is interested in girls. Sharr is interested in July. But July does not recognize the love of Sharr. July is only interested in Dr. Khet Man. July is happy to go and eat together with Dr. Khet Man. Dr. Khet Man's wife, Thet Htar San was misunderstanding. Soon, Khin Thiri Naing and Dr. Khet Man depended on each other for their business and they dated. When Zwe realized this, he was angry. Thet Htar San also found out about the fact that Dr. Khet Man had lied that she had infertility disease. In fact, only Dr. Khet Man is an infertile man. Thet Htar San was angry and told Dr. Khet Man that she would divorce him. Dr. Khet Man cried and begged that he did not want a divorce and hit him with his head against the wall. So Thet Htar San replied that she did not divorce him. But, to the media, Thet Htar San answered that Dr. Khet Man is an infertile man and is not a good person. However, Dr. Khet Man sent Thet Htar San to a mental hospital and he replied to the media that she was telling false stories about him because she was crazy. However, July and Sharr worked together with Zwe to save Thet Htar San. One day, July and Sharr took Thet Htar San away from Mental hospital, lying that Dr. Khet Man had been asked to call her. Dr. Khet Man arrested Khin Thiri Naing and forced her to take Thet Htar San. On the way he took Thet Htar San, the police caught Dr. Khet Man and sent him to a mental hospital.

== Cast ==
- Aung Min Khant as Dr. Khet Man
- Yadanar Bo as Thet Htar San
- Tayza Lin Yaung as Zwe
- May Mi Kyaw Kyaw as Khin Thiri Naing
- Snow Kyi Phyu as July
- Phyu Thae Oo as Sharr
- Zaw Oo as U Thet Naing
