= Thandar Bo =

Burmese actress, model, singer (born 1993)

- သန္တာဗိုလ်
- Born: Thandar Bo; 1 January 1993 (age 33); Yangon, Myanmar
- Education: Dagon University
- Occupations: Actress; model; singer
- Years active: 2010–present
- Height: 5 ft 11 in (1.80 m)
- Parent: Paw Shan (father)
- Relatives: Chaw Yadanar (sister)
- Musical career
- Genres: Pop, pop rock
- Instruments: Vocals

Thandar Bo (Burmese: သန္တာဗိုလ်; born 1 January 1993) is a Burmese actress, model and singer. She gained popularity after starring in the 2017 film Zoot Kyar which brought her wider recognition. Thandar Bo has released an album "Nar Lal Pay Par Ko" in 2013.

== Early life and education ==
Thandar Bo was born on 1 January 1993 in Yangon, Myanmar. She is the youngest child among three siblings, having two older sisters. Her older sister is a Myanmar Academy Award winning actress Chaw Yadanar. Her father is a musician, Paw Shan. She attended high school at Basic Education High School No. 2 Bahan. She graduated from Dagon University with a degree in History.

== Career ==
=== Beginnings as a model ===
Thandar Bo joined John Lwin's model training. Since then, she took professional training in modelling and catwalk. She began her entertainment career as a runway model as part of the John Lwin's John International Modeling Agency with countless advertising shows and runways that had been walked on. Since then, she started walking the runway at the Myanmar International Fashion Week every year. Then came the offers for TV commercials and has appeared in many music videos and as fashion model on magazine cover photos. Her hardwork as a model and acting in commercials was noticed by the film industry and soon, movie casting offers came rolling in.

=== 2010–2014: Film debut, solo debut and recognition ===
She made her acting debut in 2010 with a main role in the film Yun, alongside Kyaw Ye Aung and Soe Myat Thuzar, directed by Ko Zaw (Arr Yone Oo). She has since appeared in 12 films. In 2012, she made her big screen debut in film A Phyu Yaung Ye Dike (The White Castle), where she played the main role with Nay Toe, Pyay Ti Oo, Kaung Pyae and Eaindra Kyaw Zin, which screened in Myanmar cinemas in 2013. She launched her debut solo album "Nar Lal Pay Par Ko" on 19 September 2013 was a commercial success, gaining her a large following. She performed in the first MTV EXIT LIVE in Myanmar, held in October 2013 at People Square.

=== 2015–present: Rising popularity and breakthrough ===
In 2015, she starred in the big-screen film Zoot Kyar where she played the main role with Kyaw Ye Aung, Myint Myat, Moe Aung Yin, Ye Lay, Htet Aung Shine, Khine Thin Kyi, Patricia and May, which screened in Myanmar cinemas on 29 September 2017 and processed huge hit and successes. After this film, she starred the main role in drama film A Way Chit, alongside Aung Ye Lin, Tun Ko Ko, Thet Mon Myint and Soe Myat Thuzar which screened in Myanmar cinemas on 12 October 2018.

She then starred in her debut series Moe Saung Nway where she played the main role with Tyron Bejay, Kyat Pha, Kyaw Kyaw, Phue Sone and Hsu Myat Noe Oo, which aired on Lar Lar Kyi in 2019.

== Filmography ==
=== Film ===
- Yun (ယွန်း) (2010)
- Nal Yote Ka Lay Hnit Yoke (နယ်ရုပ်ကလေးနှစ်ရုပ်) (2013)
- Father's School (အဖေ့ကျောင်း) (2016)
- Yway Ya Khet Gyi (ရွေးရခက်ကြီး) (2016)
- 3 In 1 (သရီးအင်ဝမ်း) (2017)
- Mayar Ta Yay Noe (မာယာတရေးနိုး) (2017)
- Wi Yaw Di Phat Ser (ဝိရောဓိ ဖတ်စာ) (2017)
- Ga Htay Shit Se Thu Ba Yarzar (ကုဋေရှစ်ဆယ် သုဘရာဇာ) (2017)

=== Film (Cinema) ===
Year	Film	Burmese title	Note
2013	A Phyu Yaung Ye Dike	အဖြူရောင်ရဲတိုက်	
2013	Ko A Htar Nae Ko	ကိုယ့်အထာနဲ့ကိုယ်	
2017	Zoot Kyar	ဇွတ်ကျား	
2018	A Way Chit	အဝေးချစ်	
2018	Pin Lal Gyi Ka Bar Pyaw Lal	ပင်လယ်ကြီးကဘာပြောလဲ	

=== Television series ===
Year	English title	Myanmar title	Network	Notes
2019	Moe Saung Nway	မိုးဆောင်းနွေ	Lar Lar Kyi	

== Discography ==
=== Solo albums ===
- Nar Lal Pay Par Ko (နားလည်ပေးပါ...ကို) (2013)

== Personal life ==
Thandar Bo has been in a relationship with actor Kaung Pyae since 2012.
