= Yuu Aung Chit Mae Lu =

2019 Burmese romantic-drama film

- Film Poster
- Burmese: ရူးအောင်ချစ်မယ့်လူ
- Directed by: Aung Zaw Lin
- Screenplay by: Mal Khaing; Ingyin Han
- Based on: Yuu Aung Chit Mae Lu by Lun Htar Htar
- Starring: Nay Toe; Eaindra Kyaw Zin; May Toe Khine; Min Tharke
- Production company: Shwe Sin Oo Film Production
- Release date: September 12, 2019
- Running time: 120 minutes
- Country: Myanmar
- Language: Burmese

Yuu Aung Chit Mae Lu (Burmese: ရူးအောင်ချစ်မယ့်လူ) is a 2019 Burmese romantic-drama film starring Nay Toe, Eaindra Kyaw Zin, May Toe Khine, Min Tharke. The film, produced by Shwe Sin Oo Film Production premiered in Myanmar on September 12, 2019.

== Cast ==
- Nay Toe as A Linn Thit
- Eaindra Kyaw Zin as La Yake Nyo
- May Toe Khine as Akhayar
- Min Tharke
