= Ah Mone =

2023 Burmese television series

- Poster
- Burmese: အမုန်း
- Genre: Drama
- Created by: Mahar
- Screenplay by: Mya Hlwan Moe Swe
- Story by: Ah Nyo
- Directed by: Wyne
- Starring: Chan Min Ye Htut; Moe Hay Ko; Khin Wint Wah; Min Oo; Nyi Nanda; Khin Zarchi Kyaw; Moe Pwint Phyu; Thonedray Oo
- Music by: Z Team
- Ending theme: "Gabar Ma Kyay Ah Mone" by Thadar Nan Htike
- Composer: Htet Kaung Kin
- Country of origin: Myanmar
- Original language: Burmese
- No. of episodes: 27

Production
- Production location: Myanmar
- Cinematography: Nay Win; Moe Kyaw
- Editor: Kyaw Khine Soe
- Running time: 50 minutes
- Production company: Bo Bo Film Production

Original release
- Network: Mahar
- Release: 3 June – 8 July 2023

Ah Mone (Burmese: အမုန်း) is a 2023 Burmese drama television series directed by Wyne starring Chan Min Ye Htut, Moe Hay Ko, Khin Wint Wah, Min Oo, Nyi Nanda, Khin Zarchi Kyaw, Moe Pwint Phyu and Thonedray Oo. It was produced by Bo Bo Film Production and edited by Kyaw Khine Soe. It aired on Mahar App, from June 3 to July 8, 2023.

It also aired on Mahar TV channel, from June 15 to July 21, 2023, on Mondays to Fridays at 18:00 (MMT).

== Synopsis ==
Yamone Aye and her mother found out that her father was having an affair with his childhood sweetheart Mya Yati. Yamone Aye also started hating Mya Yati after hearing about it. Yamone Aye's mother also saw her father and Mya Yati in an apartment and she went on a rampage. When Yamone Aye was in the tenth grade, she and Htoo Min became friends. Before long, the two became lovers. One side interested in Htoo Min is My Yati daughter Pearl Thi. One day Yamone Aye's father came to ask her mother to divorce, but her mother did not accept it at all. One day Mya Yati asked her men to hit Yamone Aye's mother with a car. When Yamone Aye arrived, his mother was almost dead. But Yamone Aye remembered the car's number and the driver as well. One day, Yamone Aye applied for a job at a fashion company and got the job. Through that, U Wa Zin supported her until she became a model. One day, the house she lived in was set on fire by Mya Yati's men.

== Cast ==
- Chan Min Ye Htut as Htoo Min
- Moe Hay Ko as Mya Gamone
- Khin Wint Wah as Yamone Aye
- Min Oo as U Wai Zin
- Nyi Nanda as Nyo Min
- Khin Zarchi Kyaw as Mya Yati
- Moe Pwint Phyu as Pearl Thi
- Thonedray Oo as Ah Saw
- Cho Madi Thwin as Khattar
