= Htet Htet Htun =

Burmese actress, model, and beauty queen

- Born: Htet Htet Htun; 20 June 1992 (age 34); Yangon, Myanmar
- Education: Civil Engineering Degree from West Yangon Technological University
- Height: 5 ft 7 in (170 cm)
- Beauty pageant titleholder
- Title: Miss Universe Myanmar 2016
- Hair color: Brown
- Eye color: Black
- Major competitions: Miss Myanmar World 2014; (2nd Runner-Up); Miss Universe Myanmar 2016; (Winner); Miss Universe 2016; (Unplaced); (Best National Costume)

Htet Htet Htun (Burmese: ထက်ထက်ထွန်း; born 20 June 1992) is a Burmese actress, TV Host, model and beauty pageant titleholder who was crowned Miss Universe Myanmar 2016 and represented Myanmar at the Miss Universe 2016 Pageant. She is best known for her roles in television series Bad Daughter (2022), The Marriage (2023) and Laung (2023).

== Education ==
Htet holds a B.Tech in Civil Engineering. She currently works as an actress and model in Myanmar.

== Pageantry ==
=== Miss Universe Myanmar 2016 ===
Htet previously competed at the Miss Myanmar World 2014 and placed as second runner-up. On October 3, 2015 at the Miss Universe Myanmar 2015–2016, Htet crowned Miss Universe Myanmar 2016 together with Miss Universe Myanmar 2015, May Barani Thaw. The organization held the format for the first time in the history of Miss Myanmar.

=== Miss Universe 2016 ===
Htet represented Myanmar and won the award for Best in National Costume at Miss Universe 2016, where Pia Wurtzbach of the Philippines crowned her successor Iris Mittenaere of France at the end of the event.

== Filmography ==
=== Film (cinema) ===
Lists of Films
Year	Film	Director	Co-Stars	Role	Notes
2019	Nyit Toon	Lu Min	Lu Min, Pyay Ti Oo, Eaindra Kyaw Zin, Khine Thin Kyi	Sandi	
2024	Ta Khote Ta Ya	Wyne	Kyaw Htet Aung, Moe Hay Ko		

=== Television series ===
Lists of Series
Year	Series	Director	Co-Stars	Role	Channel	Note
2016	Charm	Thar Nyi	Bunny Phyoe, Thein Lin Soe, Phyo Zaw Lin, Nan Su Oo, Chit Kyay Hmone, Sue Khet Min, Phyo Ngwe Soe, Aye Wutyi Thaung	Pan Myat Cho	Myanmar National TV	
2019	A Kyin Nar Myit Phyar	Thar Nyi	Moe Yan Zun, Khin Wint Wah, Htoo Aung, Wai Lyan, May Kabyar Oo	Cherry	MRTV-4	
2022	Bad Daughter	Mae Min Bon	Tyron Bejay, Aye Chan Maung, Yadanar Bo, August Moe	Shwe Pon Aye Yar	Mahar	
2023	The Marriage	Mae Min Bon	Kyaw Htet Aung, Nyi Htut Khaung, Banyar Phone Pyae, Chaw Yadanar, Yadanar Bo, May Toe Khine, Thin Thae Bo	Khin Thida	Mahar	
2023	Laung	Mae Min Bon	Tyron Bejay, Chaw Yadanar, Nyi Htut Khaung, Phoo Sone, Hsu Eaint San, Shein Tin Htoo, August Moe	Aye Mya Nyein	Mahar	
2025	I'm Queen	Wyne	A Linn Yaung, Khin Wint Wah, Khin Moht Moht Aye, Soe Moe Kyi	Myat Akari	Mahar	

Awards and achievements
Preceded by Aniporn Chalermburanawong; Thailand	Miss Universe; Best National Costume; 2016	Succeeded by Momoko Abe; Japan
Preceded by May Barani Thaw	Miss Universe Myanmar; 2016	Succeeded by Zun Than Sin
