= Bad Daughter =

2022 Burmese television series

- Poster
- Burmese: သမီးဆိုး
- Genre: Drama
- Created by: Mahar
- Screenplay by: Mae Min Bon (season 1+2); Shwe Thurizza (season 1)
- Story by: Lu Nyo Chaw; Mae Min Bon
- Directed by: Mae Min Bon
- Starring: Tyron Bejay; Aye Chan Maung; Nyi Nanda; Yadanar Bo; Htet Htet Htun; Myo Sandi Kyaw; August Moe; Wah Wah Aung
- Opening theme: "Soe" by Jewel
- Ending theme: "Soe" by Jewel
- Composer: Mae Min Bon
- Country of origin: Myanmar
- Original language: Burmese
- No. of seasons: 2
- No. of episodes: 22 (9+13)

Production
- Production location: Myanmar
- Cinematography: Lin Ko Ko Htet (season 1); Pyae Sone (season 2)
- Editors: Ye Thiha (Heart to Heart); Aung Thuya Kyaw
- Running time: 50 minutes
- Production company: Aung Thiri Film Production

Original release
- Network: Mahar
- Release: 11 November – 11 December 2022

Bad Daughter (Burmese: သမီးဆိုး) is a 2022 Burmese drama television series written, theme song composed and directed by Mae Min Bon starring Tyron Bejay, Aye Chan Maung, Nyi Nanda, Yadanar Bo, Htet Htet Htun, Myo Sandi Kyaw, August Moe and Wah Wah Aung. It was produced by Aung Thiri Film Production and edited by Ye Thiha (Heart to Heart). Its season 1 aired on Mahar App, from November 11 to 24, 2022 for 9 episodes and season 2 aired from November 25 to December 11, 2022, for 13 episodes.

Its season 1 also aired on Mahar TV channel, from November 14 to 24, 2022 and season 2 aired from November 25 to December 13, 2022, on Mondays to Fridays at 18:00 (MMT).

== Synopsis ==
U Aye Yar and Daw Mi Mi Cho initially had only one daughter, Chan Mya Cho, but soon gave birth to another daughter, Shwe Pon Aye Yar. Coincidentally, at the time of the birth of Shwe Pon Aye Yar, U Aye Yar's business became very successful. Daw Oo Cho, loved both daughters equally, but U Aye Yar, was always scolded of his eldest daughter, Chan Mya Cho, and took great care of the younger daughter, Shwe Pon Aye Yar. So Shwe Pon Aye Yar became very evil. Chan Mya Cho is a polite and cool person. When they became an adult, Shwe Pon Aye Yar even tried to snatch her older sister Chan Mya Cho's lover, Phone Nyan Zin. Shwe Pon Aye Yar had an affair with Zaw Zaw, an employee of her father company, who liked her, but she only wanted to marry Phone Nyan Sin. Chan Mya Cho was generous and forgave. Then, she threatened Phone Nyan Sin's mother, Daw Khin Htake Htar. U Aye Yar also had an affair with Thae Su, and the company came into Thae Su's hands because of her plan. Thae Su is Zaw Zaw's ex-girlfriend. Later, U Aye Yar also had a stroke. In the end, Zaw Zaw killed Shwe Pon Aye Yar and killed himself.

== Cast ==
- Tyron Bejay as Phone Nyan Sin
- Aye Chan Maung as Zaw Zaw
- Nyi Nanda as U Aye Yar
- Yadanar Bo as Chan Mya Cho
- Htet Htet Htun as Shwe Pon Aye Yar
- Myo Sandi Kyaw as Daw Mi Mi Cho
- August Moe as Thae Su
- Wah Wah Aung as Daw Khin Htake Htar
