= Yin Thway =

2024 Burmese television series

- Poster
- Burmese: ရင်သွေး
- Genre: Drama
- Screenplay by: The Land
- Story by: Lu Nyo Chaw; Lone Ma
- Directed by: Mae Min Bon
- Starring: Ye Aung; Nyi Nanda; Nyi Htut Khaung; Htet Aung Shine; Banyar Phone Pyae; Wai Phyo; Khine Hnin Wai; Phoo Sone; Shwe Thamee; Thun Sett; Yadanar Bo
- Opening theme: "Yin Thway" by Aung Myint Myat
- Ending theme: "Yin Thway" by Aung Myint Myat
- Composer: Aung Myint Myat
- Country of origin: Myanmar
- Original language: Burmese
- No. of episodes: 25

Production
- Cinematography: Soe Thiha Htay
- Editors: Ye Thiha; Aung Thu; Min Pyae Thiha; Hsu Nandar Lin
- Running time: 40 minutes
- Production company: Aung Thiri Film Production

Original release
- Network: Mahar App
- Release: March 15 – April 17, 2024

Yin Thway (Burmese: ရင်သွေး), also known as The Offspring, is a 2024 Burmese drama television series directed by Mae Min Bon starring Ye Aung, Nyi Nanda, Nyi Htut Khaung, Htet Aung Shine, Banyar Phone Pyae, Wai Phyo, Khine Hnin Wai, Phoo Sone, Shwe Thamee, Thun Sett and Yadanar Bo. It was produced by Aung Thiri Film Production and theme song composed by Aung Myint Myat. It aired on Mahar App, on Mondays, Wednesdays, Fridays, Saturdays, and Sundays at 19:00, from March 15, to April 17, 2024.

It also aired on Mahar TV channel, on March 28, to May 1, 2024, on Mondays to Fridays at 18:00.

The press show of the series was held on March 15, 2025, at Melia Hotel, Yangon.

== Synopsis ==
The story mainly depicts the blood ties, secrets and unbreakable bonds within a family.

In the story, a girl named "Cindy" is an orphan who was picked up from a garbage dump when she was young, and she does not receive the love of her father and is hated. However, her mother protects her with great affection. Later, it is revealed that "Htike Tan" is not the biological son of her mother, Daw Thiri, and when Cindy learns the truth, she uses it to threaten him.

The story is interestingly presented with many plots about the marital problems, misunderstandings, and social problems caused by greed, anger and ignorance between Min Maung and his wife Manisit, who are the essential pillars of a family.

== Cast ==
- Ye Aung as U Lin Aung
- Nyi Nanda as U Thike Soe
- Nyi Htut Khaung as Min Maung
- Htet Aung Shine as Di Tha
- Banyar Phone Pyae as Htike Tan
- Wai Phyo as Htoo Chun
- Khine Hnin Wai as Daw Htet Wadi
- Phoo Sone as Daw Baby
- Shwe Thamee as Khin Nyein Chan
- Thun Sett as Cindy
- Yadanar Bo as Mani Sit
