= Lake Linka =

Lake in the state of Minnesota, United States

- Location within Minnesota
- Location: Pope County, Minnesota
- Coordinates: 45°29′26″N 95°21′54″W
- Type: lake

Lake Linka is a lake in Pope County, in the U.S. state of Minnesota.

Lake Linka was named for a local minister's wife.

== See also ==
- List of lakes in Minnesota
