= Soe Thu =

Burmese actor, singer, and physician

- စိုးသူ
- Born: Soe Thu Lwin; 30 November 1965 (age 60); Taungdwingyi, Burma (now Myanmar)
- Other names: Ko Ko Lwin; Ko Pauk
- Citizenship: Burmese
- Education: University of Medicine 1, Yangon
- Occupations: Actor; singer; physician
- Years active: 1983–present
- Spouses: Khin Mya Mya Wutt Hmone Swe (m. 2001; div. 2014): Soe Myat Nandar

Soe Thu (Burmese: စိုးသူ; pronounced [só θù]), born Soe Thu Lwin (Burmese: စိုးသူလွင်; pronounced [só θù lʊ̃́ɰ̃]; on 30 November 1965) is a Myanmar Academy Award-winning Burmese actor, singer and physician. He has achieved fame and success as an actor and singer. Throughout his career, he has produced 13 music solo albums, and acted in over 200 films.

== Early life and education ==
Soe Thu was born on 30 November 1965 in Taungdwingyi, Myanmar (Burma) to parent Khin Maung Lwin, an irrigation engineer, and Khin Thuzar, an attorney. He graduated from the University of Medicine 1, Yangon in 1996.

== Entertainment career ==
Soe Thu began his entertainment career when he was recruited by director Ni Win Tun to film Nantha Lu Chein and Pan Bu Chain. He made his break in 1982 with the film Maik Kyway Maik Pyit. In 1984, he released his first music album, Achit Ye Hmattan. He subsequently retired from the entertainment industry, emigrating to the United States in 2001. He works at the MedStar Southern Maryland Hospital Center and MedStar Washington Hospital Center in the United States as a cardiologist. He returned to Myanmar by the end of September 2012 to care for his ailing mother. Since then, he performed 3 solo shows in Yangon and Mandalay. From 1983 to present, he has starred in over 200 films.

== Personal life ==
Soe Thu was previously married to Khin Mya Mya Wutt Hmone Swe, with whom he has a daughter, Angel Soe Lwin. He has been dating actress Soe Myat Nandar since 22 May 2013.

== Discography ==
- (ရည်းစား‌လေး၊ အချစ်ရဲ့မှတ်တမ်း) (1986)
- (မျက်နှာဖုံး) (1987)
- (ကြိုပါကွယ်) (1990)
- (ဆယ်ကျော်သက်)(1991)
- (သက်ဆုံးတိုင်) (1992)
- (ရာသက်ပန်) (1993)
- (သက်ဆုံးတိုင်) (1994)
- (အရိုင်းလေး) (1995)
- (ဘာမှားနေလဲ) (1995)
- (သဘာဝ) (1995)
- (ကျေပါတော့နှင့်အကောင်းဆုံးတေးများ) (1998)
- (ကြည်ဖြူပါတော့ရာသက်ပန်) (2000)
- (ကိုယ့်နေ့သစ်များ) (2001)
- (အမြတ်နိုးဆုံးမင်းအကြောင်းလေး) (2015)

== Filmography ==
Over 200 films, including

- Maik Kyway Maik Pyit (မိုက်ကြွေးမိုက်ပြစ်) (1983)
