= Khine Hnin Wai =

Burmese actress

- ခိုင်နှင်းဝေ
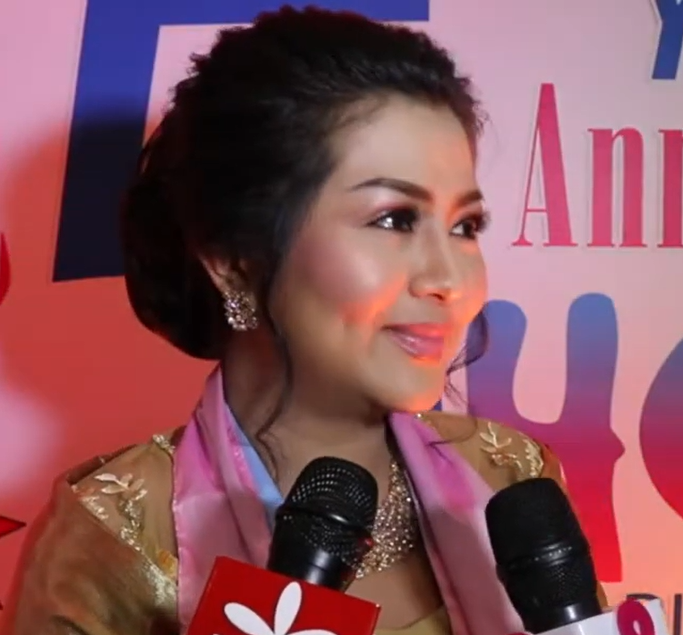
- Khine in 2019
- Born: Khine Hnin Wai; 14 March 1981 (age 45); Rangoon, Burma
- Education: Dagon University
- Occupations: Actress, Model
- Years active: 1999–present

Khine Hnin Wai (Burmese: ခိုင်နှင်းဝေ; born on 14 March 1981) is a Burmese actress, philanthropist, and activist for victims of child rape. She is best known for her charitable work in Myanmar as the founder of the Khine Hnin Wai Foundation, a charity that supports orphanages, flood victims, and other humanitarian causes.

== Early life ==
Khine was born on 14 March 1981 in Myanmar.

== Career ==
Khine began her career in 1999. She became popular for her role as the lead in the film, San Ye . In 2005, she starred in the film Kyun Ma Ka Mahaythi (I'm Mistress) alongside Pyay Ti Oo and Moe Hay Ko. In 2018, she was cast in the drama series Tu Hnine Ma Ya Tae Myittar, alongside Nay Dway and Poe Ei Ei Khant.

== Charity work ==
Khine has founded a charity organization since 2014, which is very active in several places in Myanmar.

In December 2015, motivated by her charitable efforts for children, she commenced her role as an ambassador for United Act, an educational drama troupe focused on preventing child trafficking. Serving in this capacity, she personally financed and directed a short educational film titled "Help Them". Demonstrating her commitment, she distributed complimentary DVDs of this informative documentary drama. She actively participated in these educational dramas and plays, offering support whenever United Act sought her assistance.

She also established the Khine Hnin Wai Children's Home in 2018, located in North Dagon Township. The orphanage currently provides a home for 39 children, all aged two or below. Notably, five of these children are survivors of child rape, while others were abandoned by young single mothers.

In response to the 2025 Myanmar earthquake, Khine Hnin Wai donated a total of 2.5 billion kyats to support hospitals in Pyinmana and Naypyidaw, as well as to provide aid for homes that were damaged or destroyed.

== Personal life ==
Khine Hnin Wai married Chan Nyein Kyaw, a military captain and the brother of actress Thinzar Wint Kyaw, in 2004. The couple divorced on 23 December 2009.

Following her divorce, Khine Hnin Wai has been publicly linked to several relationships with tomboy partners. She co-managed the LGBT-themed My Place Café with her then-partner, Junior Dennis (also known as Mg JD), a transgender man. Fifty percent of the café’s profits were allocated to supporting the Khine Hnin Wai Foundation.

== Selected filmography ==
=== Film (cinema) ===
- San Yay (ဆန်ရေ) (1999)
- Kyoe Hpyang Chi Htar Thaw Varanasi (ကြိုးဖြင့်ချည်ထားသော ဗာရာဏသီ; lit. “Varanasi tied with [a] rope”) (2017)
- Sit Ko Mone Yae Tike Khae The (စစ်ကိုမုန်း၍တိုက်ခဲ့သည်; lit. “Hating war, [someone] fought”) (2018)

=== Television series ===
- Yin Thway (ရင်သွေး) (2024)
- Kyun Ma Ka Belain (ကျွန်မကဗီလိန်) (2024)

== Awards ==
In 2018, Khine Hnin Wai was honored with the Hope Charity Icon Award by the Hope Charity Myanmar Foundation.

In November 2023, Khine was named to the BBC's 100 Women list.
