= Paweł Linka =

Polish footballer

Personal information
- Date of birth: 26 June 1986 (age 40)
- Place of birth: Poznań, Poland
- Height: 1.98 m (6 ft 6 in)
- Position: Goalkeeper

Youth career
- TPS Winogrady

Senior career*
Years	Team	Apps	(Gls)
2003	Amica Wronki II		
2004–2006	Amica Wronki	6	(0)
2004	→ Promień Żary (loan)		
2006–2008	Lech Poznań	1	(0)
2007–2008	→ Odra Wodzisław (loan)	1	(0)
2009	Skoda Xanthi	0	(0)
2009–2011	Podbeskidzie Bielsko-Biała	2	(0)
2012–2013	GKS Dopiewo	34	(0)
- * Club domestic league appearances and goals

Paweł Linka (born 26 June 1986) is a Polish former professional footballer who played as a goalkeeper for Ekstraklasa clubs such as Amica Wronki, Lech Poznań and Odra Wodzisław.
