= Bago University =

University in Bago, Myanmar

- ပဲခူးတက္ကသိုလ်
- Motto: ပညာယ အတ္ထံ ဇာနာတိ Paññāya Atthaṃ Jānāti
- Motto in English: Knowledge know the meaning
- Type: Public
- Established: May 27, 1977; 49 years ago
- Affiliations: Ministry of Education (Myanmar)
- Rector: R KAR SOE
- Students: 815 students (2022-2023 Academic Year)
- Location: 8/9 ward, Yangon-Mandalay Highway Road, Oakthar Myothit; Bago 08018, Bago, Bago Region, 08018, Myanmar; 17°15′53.0″N 96°28′18.6″E
- Website: bagouni.moe.edu.mm

Bago University (Burmese: ပဲခူးတက္ကသိုလ်) is a public university, located in Bago, Myanmar that offers bachelor's and post-graduate degree programs in Arts and Science.

== History ==
Bago Division Regional College was established on 27 March 1977. It was upgraded to Bago College on 30 November 1981, and to Bago Degree College on 17 August 1992. On 13 June 2011, the college was upgraded to Bago University.

As a response to the violent suppression of the Letpadan student strike in 2015, the rector of Bago University imposed a ban on students who attempted to take the exam while wearing white and black wristbands in protest. In the aftermath of the 2021 Myanmar coup d'état, the teachers, professors, and staff of Bago University organized a red ribbon campaign, and joined the Civil Disobedience Movement on February 5 to express their opposition to the military coup and to show their commitment to accepting only a democratically elected government.

== Courses ==
The university offers Bachelor of Arts (B.A) and Master of Arts (M.A) programs in six disciplines: Myanmar, English, Geography, History, Oriental Studies and Philosophy, as well as Bachelor of Science (B.Sc.) and Master of Science (M.Sc.) programs in six disciplines: Physics, Mathematics, Chemistry, Geology, Zoology and Botany.

In the academic year 2018-2019, there were 9,454 full-time learning students and over 10,000 distance learning students at Bago University.

== Departments ==
- Department of Myanmar
- Department of English
- Department of Mathematics
- Department of Chemistry
- Department of Physics
- Department of Geography
- Department of History
- Department of Geology
- Department of Philosophy
- Department of Zoology
- Department of Botany
- Department of Oriental Studies

== Notable organization ==
- Bago University Students' Union

== See also ==
- List of universities in Myanmar
