= Thun Sett =

Burmese actress

- သွန်းဆက်
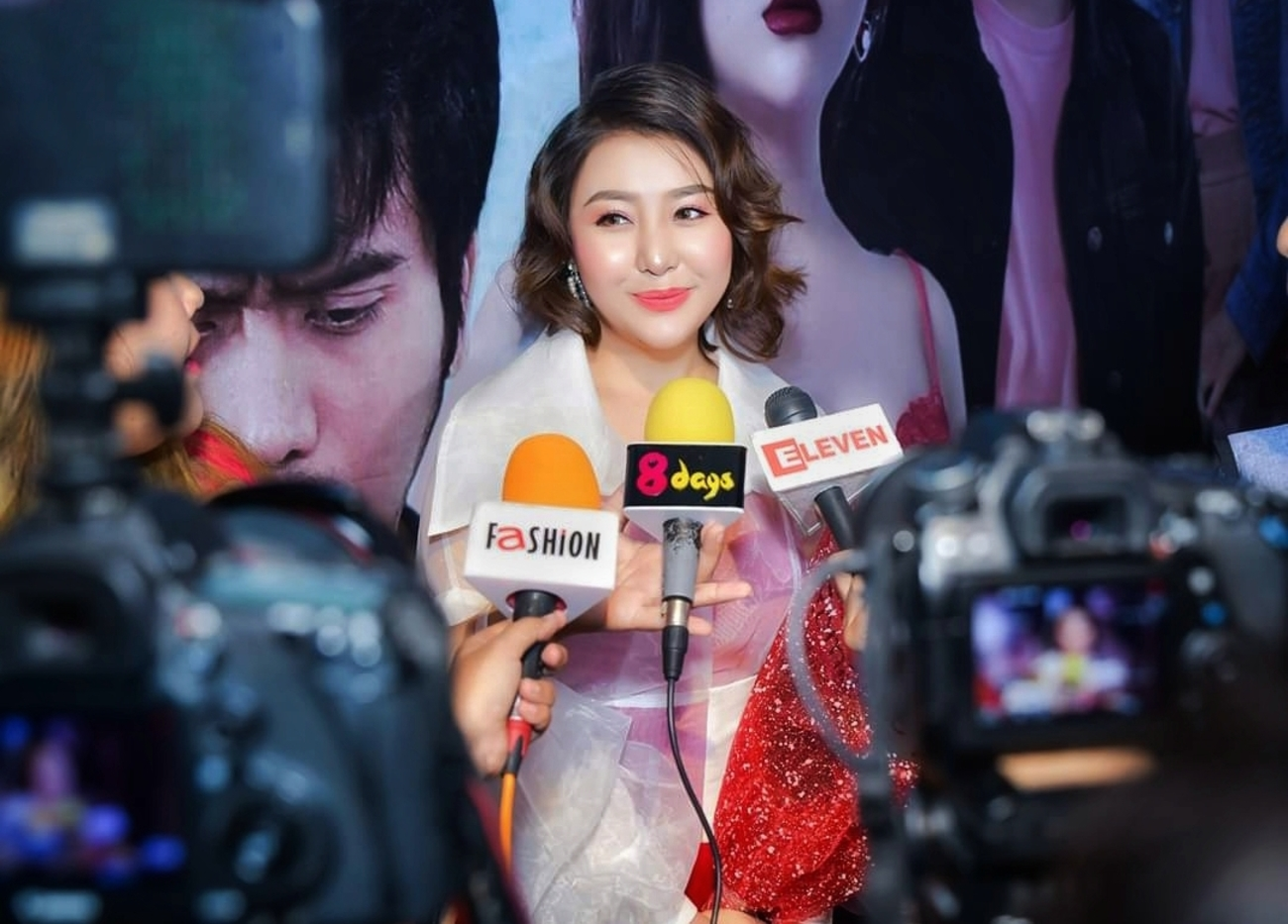
- Thun Sett in 2019
- Born: Thun Sett Nwe; March 29, 1991 (age 35); Yangon, Myanmar
- Other name: Agoon
- Education: University of East Yangon
- Occupations: Actress; model
- Years active: 2013–present
- Height: 5 ft 3 in (1.60 m)
- Relatives: Myat Paing Phyo

Thun Sett (Burmese: သွန်းဆက်; born Thun Sett Nwe on 29 March 1991) is a Burmese actress and model. She is best known for her leading roles in several Burmese films. Throughout her career, she has acted in over 100 films.

== Early life and education ==
Thun Sett was born on 29 March 1991 in Yangon, Myanmar to parent Thet Win and his wife Sandar Win. She has one younger sibling named Myat Paing Phyo. She attended high school at Basic Education High School No. 4 Ahlone and graduated from East Yangon University with a degree in chemistry.

== Career ==
Thun Sett entered the entertainment industry in 2013. She was selected the Academy Ban Kine, the person tasked with holding the tray of the academy statue at the Myanmar Academy Awards Ceremony that year. After that, she worked as a photo model and appeared on many local magazine cover photos, but faded from the limelight in 2014.

She made her acting debut in 2014 with a leading role in film Bae Kwel alongside Lu Min. She then starred in her second film Ka Kyoe Twe Thwe Kar Yit Yar, where she played the lead role with Min Maw Kun and Nyi Htut Khaung. In 2015, she starred in film A Htee Hmone alongside Min Maw Kun, was both a domestic hit, and led to increased recognition for Thun Sett.

Thun Sett made her big-screen debut with Ma Yar Kyauk Ywar where she played the main role with Lu Min, Khant Sit, Nyi Htut Khaung, Soe Myat Thuzar and Khine Thin Kyi, which screened in Myanmar cinemas in 2017. Her portrayal of the character earned praised by fans for her acting performance and character interpretation, and experienced a resurgence of popularity. In late 2018, she was cast in romantic drama Yin Khwin Shin Tan, where she played the main role with Hein Wai Yan, Nyein Thaw and Aye Wutyi Thaung, aired on Channel 9 on 28 May 2019. She co-starred with Khant Sithu, Tun Ko Ko and Shwe Hmone Yati in drama film Thamee Lay Ye Ywar, is based on the true story which screened in Myanmar cinemas on 4 January 2019.

== Selected filmography ==
=== Film ===
Over 100 films, include

- Bae Kwel (ဘဲကွဲ) (2014)
- Ka Kyoe Twe Thwe Kar Yit Yar (ကကြိုးတွေသွယ်ကာရစ်ကာ) (2014)
- A Htee Hmone (အထီးမှုန်) (2015)
- Ywar Ko Pyan Kae Arr Luu (ရွာကိုပြန်ခဲ့ အာလူး) (2016)
- Pat Pat Set Set Amone (ပတ်ပတ်စက်စက်အမုန်း) (2016)
- Lady Mi Tae Asate (လေဒီမိတဲ့အဆိပ်) (2016)
- Ywar Thar (ရွာသား) (2017)
- Par Mhwar (ပါမွှား) (2017)
- Kya Taw Yesar Nainganchar Pyan (ကျွန်တော့်ရည်းစား နိုင်ငံခြားပြန်) (2017)

=== Film (Cinema) ===
- Ma Yar Kyauk Ywar (မယားကြောက်ရွာ) (2017)
- Sit Ko Mone Ywae Tite Khae Ti (စစ်ကိုမုန်း၍တိုက်ခဲ့သည်) (2018)
- Thamee Lay Ye Ywar (သမီးလေးရဲ့ရွာ) (2019)
- Thayel Thinbaw (သရဲသင်္ဘော) (2019)
- Shae Thwar Nauk Laik (ရှေ့သွားနောက်လိုက်) (2019)
- Kabar Kyaw Yoke Shin (ကမ္ဘာကျော်ရုပ်ရှင်) (2020)

=== Television series ===
Year	English title	Myanmar title	Network	Notes
2019	Yin Khwin Shin Tan	ရင်ခွင်ရှင်းတမ်း	Channel 9	
2024	Yin Thway	ရင်သွေး	Mahar	
