= Nay Htoo Naing =

Burmese actor and film director

- နေထူးနိုင်
- Born: 1 January 1979 (age 47); Yenangyaung, Magway Region, Myanmar
- Other name: Kwee Nay Htoo Naing
- Occupations: Actor, Director
- Years active: 1997–present
- Spouse: Mya Thin Chel
- Children: 2

Nay Htoo Naing (Burmese: နေထူးနိုင်; born 1 January 1979) is a Burmese actor and film director. He is one of the most successful actors in Myanmar's B-rated action film industry and has been regarded as the "Burmese Chuck Norris". Throughout his career, he has acted in over 300 films.

== Early life ==
Nay Htoo Naing was born on 1 January 1979 in Yenangyaung, Magway Region, Myanmar. He applied to Defence Services Academy (D.S.A) after graduating from high school, but he was declined because of failure in some physical tests. Then he moved to Yangon from Yenangyaung to pursue a career in show business.

== Career ==
Nay Htoo Naing did not have any connections to the Burmese film industry before starting out his career as a worker, security guard and eventually as an actor. But then, at the age of 20, he grasped his first chance to be in front of a camera. He did not go to any formal school or training courses to study acting; however he says director Aung Min Thein is his mentor and taught him a lot. He entered the film industry with the film Ba Yoke, where he played the lead role. He then starred in the film Amye Mae Dar (Nameless Sword), which led to increased recognition for him. His classic film Mee Lat War (Fire Palm) is popular and one of the all-time best films in his career. He acted not only in the several direct-to-videos, but also acted in the big screen films. Throughout his successful career, he has acted in over 300 films. He is also a film director and directing the film Amone Zayike Amone Winkabar. In 2018, he founded the Target Art Training Center in Yangon.

== Filmography ==
=== Film ===
- Over 300 films

== Personal life ==
Nay Htoo Naing is married to singer Mya Thin Chal in 2011. They have two sons, named Phone Lattyar and Phone Lin kar. His wife Mya Thin Chal is also actress in his some films.
