= Poe Ei Ei Khant =

Burmese actress and singer (born 1993)

- ပိုးအိအိခန့်
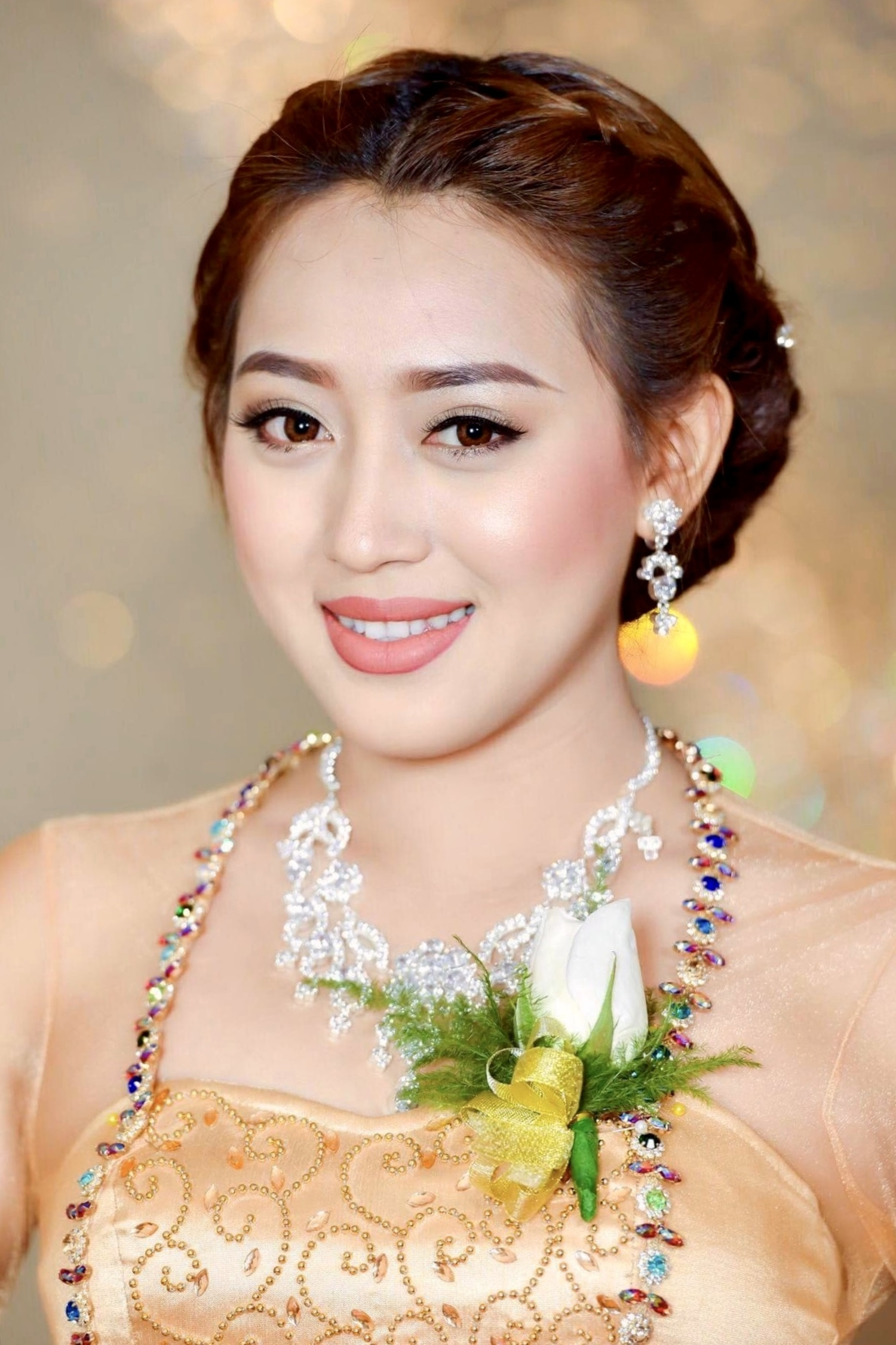
- Poe Ei Ei Khant in 2018
- Born: Poe Ei Ei Khant; 7 April 1993 (age 33); Yangon, Myanmar
- Education: University of West Yangon; East Yangon University
- Occupation: Actress
- Years active: 2013–present
- Spouse: Aung Thu (m. 2018)

Poe Ei Ei Khant (Burmese: ပိုးအိအိခန့်; born 7 April 1993) is a Burmese actress. She is best known for her leading roles in several Burmese films. Throughout her career, she has acted in over 100 films.

== Early life and education ==
Poe Ei Ei Khant was born on 7 April 1993 in Yangon, Myanmar to parent Thein Lwin, a real-estate developer and chairman of Myanmar Real Property Development Association (MRPDA) and his wife Moe Moe Thein. She is the youngest child among two siblings, having an older brother.

She finished her primary and secondary education at Basic Education High School No. 1 Dagon. She studied law in distance education at the University of West Yangon and then switched to Master of Laws at the East Yangon University. She graduated with LLB (Law) at the University of West Yangon in 2016, and Master of Laws (LLM) at the East Yangon University in 2019.

== Career ==
=== 2013–2016: Beginning and film debut ===
In 2013, she competed in the fifth season of Eain Met Sone Yar (Where dreams meet) and placed as the eighth runner-up in the final completion. Thereafter she entered the film industry. She made her acting debut with a leading role in the film O Ay Ay O, alongside Lu Min in 2015. She then starred in her second film Myay Thin Nant, where she played the leading role with Myint Myat, film released in March 2016. The film was both a domestic hit in Myanmar, and led to increased recognition for Poe Ei Ei Khant. From 2013 to present, she has acted in more than 100 films and 6 big-screen films.

=== 2017–present: Breaking into the big-screen ===
In 2017, she filmed her first big-screen film Black Rose Mission (A Yu Taw Mingalar) where she played the leading role with Myint Myat and Nan Su Oo. The film was directed by Nyo Min Lwin and which premiered in Myanmar cinemas on 6 June 2019. She then starred in action film Original Gangster 3, but the censors not allowed to screen in Myanmar cinema. The same year, she starred in drama film A Htet Tan Sar (High Standard), alongside Nay Toe, Nyi Htut Khaung and Thu Riya which premiered in Myanmar cinemas on 22 August 2019. The film was a huge commercial success, topping film ratings and ranked third on The Myanmar Times "Top 10 Myanmar films 2019".

In 2018, she was cast in the drama series Tu Nhing Maya Tae Myitta, alongside Nay Dway and Khine Hnin Wai.

== Selected filmography ==
=== Film (Cinema) ===
Year	English title	Burmese title	Role	Notes
2019	Black Rose Mission (A Yu Taw Mingalar)	အယူတော်မင်္ဂလာ	April Htake Tin Htar	Lead role
2019	A Htet Tan Sar	အထက်တန်းစား	Poe Mani Shan	Lead role
TBA	Original Gangster 3	အော်ရီဂျင်နယ် ဂိုဏ်းစတား ၃	?	not allow

=== Film ===
Over 100 films, including

Year	Film	Burmese title	Co-Stars	Note
2015	O Ay Ay O	အိုအေ့အေ့အို	Lu Min	
2016	Myay Thin Nant	မြေသင်းနံ့	Myint Myat	
2016	Cherry Khaw Than	ချယ်ရီခေါ်သံ	Myint Myat	
2016	Alninyo	အယ်နီညို	Zay Ye Htet, Khine Hnin Wai	
2016	Chauk Kyoe	ခြောက်ကြိုး	Aung Ye Lin, Moht Moht Myint Aung	
2016	Naut Lu Lu Naut	နောက်လူ လူနောက်	Khant Sithu, Yaza Ne Win	
2016	A Kway Htu Tha Ye Pu	အကြွေးထူ သရဲပူ	Nay Dway	
2016	Min Yae Ko...Ko Yae Min	မင်းရဲ့ကိုယ် ကိုယ့်ရဲ့မင်း	Kaung Pyae, Moe Hay Ko	
2016	Heart Hti P Kat Nyi Thwar Tal	ဟတ်ထိပြီး ကတ်ငြိသွားတယ်	Khant Sithu, Khine Thin Kyi	
2016	Rocker Kyaw Gyi	ရော်ကာကျော်ကြီး	Myint Myat	
2016	Sone Mhat	ဆုံမှတ်	Phyo Ngwe Soe	
2016	Lu That Tann Ma Ka Sar Ya	လူသတ်တမ်း မကစားရ	Lu Min	
2017	Pokémon Pyazat	ပိုကီမွန် ပြဇာတ်	Nay Dway	
2017	Byu Har	ဗျူဟာ	Nay Dway	
2017	Pann Nu...Nar Lal Par	ပန်းနု...နားလည်ပါ	Zay Ye Htet	
2017	Alat Kaung Mway Nae	အလတ်ကောင်မွေးနေ့	Min Khant Nyi, Lu Min	
2017	Arr Gyi Nae Chit Mal	အားကြီးနဲ့ချစ်မယ်	Nay Dwe	
2017	10 Thein Tan Khone Phi Nat	၁၀သိန်းတန် ခုံဖိနပ်	Aung Ye Lin	
2017	Shin Khan Pyat	ရှင်ခန်းပြတ်	Nay Naw	
2017	Lan Bar Putu	လန်ဘား ပုတု	Minn Khant Ko	
2017	Chit Phot Thit Sot	ချစ်ဖို့သစ်စို့	Nay Dway	
2017	A Tu A Yaung	အတုအယောင်	Nay Dway	
2017	Ho Lu Gyi	ဟိုလူကြီး	Htet Nay Chan, Ye Aung	
2017	Thu Wite Ko Wite	သူဝိုက် ကိုယ်ဝိုက်	Nay Dway	
2017	Athel Chin Tu	အသည်းချင်းတူ	Nay Dway, Htet Aung Shine	
2017	Maung Lel Nama Lel	မောင်လည် နှမလည်	Nay Dway, Paing Takhon, Paing Phyo Thu	
2017	Yar Za Win Yine Thwar Mal	ရာဇဝင်ရိုင်းသွားမယ်	Kyaw Ye Aung	
2017	Lay Tha Nat	လေသေနတ်	Khant Sithu, San Yati Moe Myint	
2017	Pyaw Kyi Kyi	ပြောကြည့်ကြည့်	Phyo Ngwe Soe	
2017	Pyat Ywae A Pyone	ပြတ်ရွေ့အပြုံး	Min Maw Kun	
2018	Out Tan Sar	အောက်တန်းစား	Nay Dway, Kelvin Kate	
2018	Number Tit Ta Yar Khan	နံပါတ်တစ် တရားခံ	Nay Naw	
2018	Thway Thit Sar Nint Yin Khae The 1	သွေးသစ္စာနှင့် ရင်းခဲ့သည် (၁)	Nay Naw	
2018	Thway Thit Sar Nint Yin Khae The 2	သွေးသစ္စာနှင့် ရင်းခဲ့သည် (၂)	Nay Naw	
2018	Taw Thar Gyi Chit Tae Kha Lain	တောသားကြီးချစ်တဲ့ ခလိန်း	Nay Dway	
2018	Ga Yu Nar	ဂရုဏာ	Kaung Pyae	
2018	Alinn Mae Kaung Kin	အလင်းမဲ့ကောင်းကင်	Nay Dway	
2018	Gaung Hti A Kone U	ခေါင်ထိအကုန်ယူ	Khant Sithu	
2018	Dr Shwe Ou Mi Pu Yauk Kyar	ဒေါက်တာရွှေဥ မိပုယောက်ျား	Kaung Pyae	
2018	A Than Thway Yae Nauk	အသံတွေရဲ့နောက်	Kaung Pyae, Chit Thu Wai	
2018	Out Tan Sar	အောက်တန်းစား	Nay Dway	
2018	999	နိုင်းနိုင်းနိုင်း	Kaung Pyae, Khin Wint Wah	
2019	Mar Yar Mee Tauk	မာယာမီးတောက်	Thu Htoo San	
2019	Noon	နွံ	Zay Ye Htet	
2019	A Khon	အခွံ	Zay Ye Htet	

=== Television series ===
Year	English title	Myanmar title	Role	Network	Notes
2018	Tu Nhaing Maya Tae Myittar	တုနှိုင်းမရတဲ့မေတ္တာ	Ma Nge	MRTV-4	

== Personal life ==
Poe Ei Ei Khant is married to Aung Thu, a footballer, on 31 May 2018 and the wedding ceremony held on 26 March 2019 at the Western Park. She gave birth to their first son Thwin Oo Han on 19 July 2019.
