= East Yangon University =

University in Myanmar

Coordinates: 16°44′08″N 96°17′11″E

University of East Yangon
- ရန်ကုန် အရှေ့ပိုင်း တက္ကသိုလ်
- Type: Public
- Established: as college 1999; 27 years ago upgraded in 2000 as University
- Rector: Dr. Kyaw Kyaw Khaung
- Academic staff: 336
- Total staff: 566
- Students: 11,000 (2006)
- Location: Thanlyin, Yangon, Myanmar
- Website: www.eyu.edu.mm

The University of East Yangon (Burmese: ရန်ကုန် အရှေ့ပိုင်း တက္ကသိုလ် [jàɰ̃ɡòʊɰ̃ ʔəsʰḛbáɪɰ̃ tɛʔkəθò]), located in Thanlyin in the southeastern suburbs of Yangon, is a liberal arts and sciences university in Myanmar. The university offers bachelor's degree programs in liberal arts and sciences and law.

A train service opened in 2006 connects the university campus to downtown Yangon. About 2,000 students use the service daily.

New Convocation Hall building was inaugurated on 25 November 2014.

== History ==
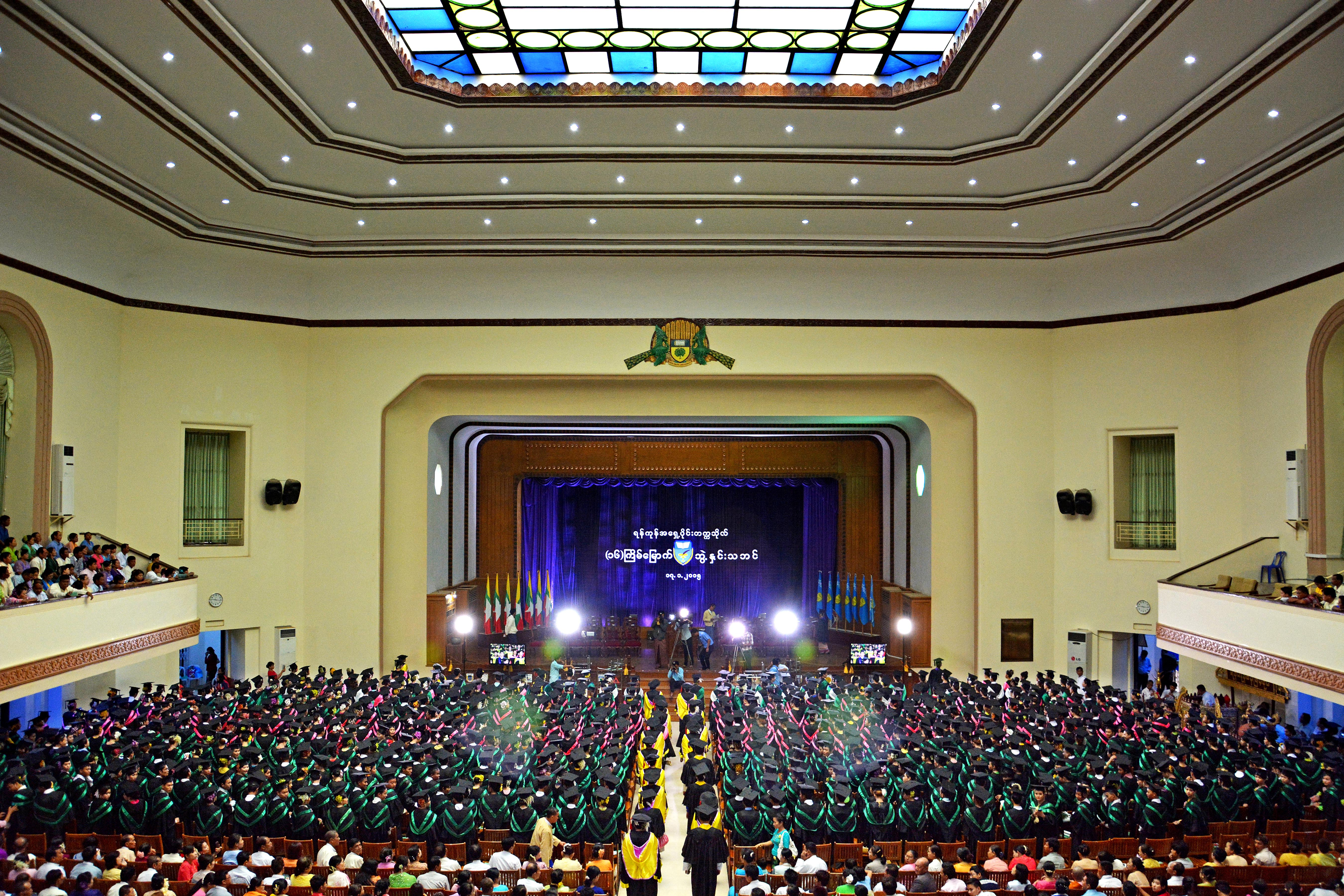
A graduation ceremony for the East Yangon University held at the University of Yangon's Convocation Hall in 2019.

The University of East Yangon was founded in 2000. The move was widely believed to be part of the Burmese military government's plan to disperse university students across many universities and colleges around the country. Students who would have attended Yangon University now have to attend Dagon University or East Yangon University in Thanlyin, southeast of Yangon.

== Programs ==
Classified as an Arts and Science university in the Burmese university education system, University of East Yangon offers bachelor's and master's degree programs in common liberal arts and sciences disciplines. Starting from 2014, regular Bachelor of Arts (BA) and Bachelor of Science (BSc) take four years to complete and honors degree programs BA (Hons) and BSc (Hons) take five years. The regular law program also takes five years.

Program	Bachelor's	Master's	Doctorate
Botany	BSc	MSc	
Burmese	BA	MA	
Chemistry	BSc	MSc	
English	BA	MA	
Environmental Studies	BES		
Geography	BA	MA	
Geology	BSc	MSc	
History	BA	MA	
Industrial Chemistry	BSc		
International Relations	BA	MA	
Law	LLB BA(Law)	LLM	
Oriental Studies	BA	MA	
Philosophy	BA	MA	
Psychology	BA	MA	
Mathematics	BSc	MSc	
Physics	BSc	MSc	
Zoology	BSc	MSc	
Library and information Studies	BA	MA	

== Administration ==
=== List of rectors ===
- Aung Than (Head Master Of Thanlyin College)
- Kyi Win
- Dr. Win
- Tin Maung Nyunt (Acting Rector)
- Kyaw Ye Tun
- Dr. Kyaw Kyaw Khaung
- Dr. Nay Win Oo

== Associations ==
UTA University Teachers' Association is legally established in 2012 in accord with the Labour Law of Myanmar.

EYUSU East Yangon University Students Union is legally established in 2017 with the election of student.
