= Soe Myat Nandar =

Burmese actress

- စိုးမြတ်နန္ဒာ
- Born: Soe Myat Nandar; December 15, 1979 (age 46); Dawei, Myanmar (formerly Burma)
- Other name: Dar Dar
- Education: University of Yangon
- Occupation: Actress
- Years active: 1996–present
- Height: 5 ft 8 in (1.73 m)
- Spouse: Soe Thu (2013–present)
- Awards: Myanmar Academy Award (Best Supporting Actress for 2001, 2004)

Soe Myat Nandar (Burmese: စိုးမြတ်နန္ဒာ; pronounced [só mjàɴ nàɴdà]; born 15 December 1979) is a two-time Myanmar Academy Award winning Burmese actress. She won her first Myanmar Academy Award for Best Supporting Actress in 2001 with the film Achit Ko Mwe Phwar Chin and achieved her second award for Best Supporting Actress in 2004 with film Chit Chin Nge Pyaing.

Soe is considered one of the most successful actresses in Burmese cinema. Throughout her career, she has acted in over 170 films.

== Early life and education ==
Soe Myat Nandar was born on 15 December 1979 in Dawei, Tanintharyi Division, Myanmar (formerly Burma) to parent Soe Myint, a retired major and his wife Kyi Kyi Khin. She is the youngest daughter of four siblings, having two elder sisters and one brother. Her older sisters Soe Myat Thuzar, Soe Myat Klayar and her cousins Soe Pyae Thazin, Sandy Myint Lwin are also actresses. She attended high school at Basic Education High School No. 2 Bahan (BEHS No. 2 Bahan). She graduated from the University of Yangon in 2001.

== Career ==
Soe began her entertainment career when she was recruited by director Kyaw Hein to film Kan Kaung Loh in 1996. She took on her first big-screen role in the film Chit Like Top One Two Three (ချစ်လိုက်တော့ ဝမ်းတူးသရီး) in 1997.

== Personal life ==
In 2005, she married Phyo Gyi, a singer. The couple divorced in 2007, after having a son, Myat Thaw Maung. She has been dating actor and singer, Soe Thu, since 22 April 2014.

== Film ==
Year	Title	Burmese title	Director	Costar	Award
1997		ချစ်လိုက်တော့ ဝမ်းတူးသရီး			
1999		နှောင်ထုံးဖွဲ့ မေတ္တာ			
2000		အချစ်ဖြတ်သန်းရာ ဒေသ			
2001		ပုံလာလာ ပြောတိုင်းယုံ			
2001		ရင်ထဲမှာ ဘာညာဘာညာ			
2001		ဆေးပေါင်းခတဲ့ ည			
2001	Achit Ko Mwe Phwar Chin	အချစ်ကို မွေးဖွားခြင်း			Best Supporting Actress
2002		ပုဏ္ဏားဘကွန်း			
2002		ဒဏ်ရာများနဲ့ အချစ်			
2002		ရွှေမှုန်ကြဲတဲ့ မိုးကောင်းကင်			
2002		စပျစ်ချိုနှင့် ချယ်ရီဝိုင်			
2003		ငှက်ကလေးရဲ့ ဒဏ္ဍာရီ			
2003		ညွှန်းစာဖွဲ့လို့ မမှီ			
2004		ပေါက်ပေါက်မြောက်မြောက်			
2004		စတိုင်			
2004		အပြောင်းအလဲ			
2004		ပန်းဒဏ္ဍာရီ			
2004	Chit Chin Nge Pyaing	ချစ်ခြင်းငယ် ပြိုင်			Best Supporting Actress
2004		လျှို့ဝှက်သော နှင်း			
2005		သုံးသုံးလီ ချစ်			
2005		ကျန်စစ်မင်း			
2005		ပျော်လိုက်ရအောင်			
2005		ဆဋ္ဌဂံ			
2005		မျှော်လင့်ခြင်းများစွာ			
2005		ရွှေမိုးသည်း			
2008		အမည်မဖော်လိုသူ အချစ်			
2011		လာထား အာဘွား			
2012		ချစ်တယ်ပြောမှ လွှတ်မယ်			
2012		ဥ			
2013		သေးသေးလေးပဲလား ကြီးကြီးလား			
2016		ရုံးပတီသီးလေးများ			
2023	A Red Blanket	စောင်နိလေးတစ်ထည်			

== Awards and nominations ==
Year	Award	Category	Nominated work	Result
2001	Myanmar Academy Award	Best Supporting Actress	Achit Ko Mwe Phwar Chin	Won
2004	Myanmar Academy Award	Best Supporting Actress	Chit Chin Nge Pyaing	Won
