= Su Shun Lae =

Burmese actress

- Born: Su Nanda Aye; July 28, 1981 (age 44); Rangoon, Burma
- Occupations: Actress, Model
- Years active: 2002
- Spouse: Zayar Win

Su Shun Lae (Burmese: ဆုရွှန်းလဲ, also spelt Su Shun Lai, Su Shoon Lae, Su Shune Lae; born 28 July 1981) is a Burmese film actress and advertising model. Her first advertisement was "Tabarwa Pa Nya Myay". The advertisement she is most popular for is " Lin Tit sar". Her first film is "Sa Hta Gan". She starred in one film, 25 videos and 54 advertisements until May 2004.

Su Shun Lae is married to Zayar Win and wedding reception at the Sedona Hotel in Yangon on June 5, 2014.

== Filmography ==
=== Films ===
- Sa Hta Gan

=== Video ===
- Joe [Part II]
- Lay Pyay Nan Tae Taching
- Nay Min Yae Ei Daw Tha Wingabar
- Hta Man Thi Yae Taman Kyar
- Kaday Shit Sel Ta Thay Thar
- Than Gaung Sut Min Thar Nae Set Kaw Ma Dar Tha Mar
- Villain Hero
- Kyun Taw Ka Lu Mike
- Than Ta Yar Set Won Ta Nay Yar Yar [Part I]
- Tway Yine Kya Mar Yine Bawa Yine
- Mote Soe Htaung Chauk Taw Mhaut The Thar Kaung
- A Hlwar
- Lin No` Gang Nae Mhaw Win Dar Na Let
- La Min A Linka A Nyeint
- Lu Mike Ba Tode
- Sar Palin Min Aung Shwe Moe Ngwe Moe Ywar Say Phyo [Part I]
- Lu Kyan
- Mi Chaung Theit
- Sanda Pinle
- Phoee Sar Phat
