= May Toe Khine =

Burmese actress and model

- မေတိုးခိုင်
- Born: May 7, 1995 (age 31); Yangon, Myanmar
- Occupation: Actress
- Relatives: Eaindra Kyaw Zin (aunt)

May Toe Khine (Burmese: မေတိုးခိုင်) is a Burmese actress and a fashion and commercial model.

She gained widespread popularity after starring in Yuu Aung Chit Mae Lu in 2019. Her portrayal of the character Akhayar earned praise by fans for her acting performance and character interpretation, and experienced a surge of popularity.

== Acting career and popularity ==
May starred in the documentary series Mythical Myanmar Bagan, alongside Naw Phaw Eh Htar. The documentary is travel across exotic ancient city of Myanmar, Bagan to discover culture, heritage and beauty.

=== 2018–present: Acting debut and rising popularity ===
She made her acting debut in Yuu Aung Chit Mae Lu alongside Eaindra Kyaw Zin and Nay Toe. Her portrayal of the character Akhayar earned praised by fans for her acting performance and character interpretation, and she experienced a resurgence of popularity.

== Filmography ==
=== Film (cinema) ===
Lists of Films
Year	Film	Director	Co-Stars	Role	Notes
2019	Yuu Aung Chit Mae Lu	Aung Zaw Lin	Nay Toe, Eaindra Kyaw Zin, Min Tharke	Akhayar	

=== Short film ===
Year	Film	Director	Co-Stars	Role	Notes
2019	Kalay A Tharr Kharr Thi	-	-	-	

=== Television series ===
Lists of Series
Year	Series	Director	Co-Stars	Role	Channel	Note
2018	Mythical Myanmar Bagan	-	-	Herself	Iflix	
2022	Chit Say	Pwint Theingi Zaw	Ye Yint Thaw, Kyaw Tun, Myo Htut Naing, Kaung Sett Htoo, Bhone Hlyan, Khin Yati Thin, Pyo Pyo May, Aye Thida	Cherry	Fortune TV	
2023	Rangoon Nights	Sai Nyan Linn Sett	Nyi Nanda, Myo Sandi Kyaw, Ba Gyan, Thoon Thet Htoo San, U Htun, Nay Htut, Bo Min Khant, Swan Htet, May Barami	Kyi Phyu	Mahar	
2023	The Marriage	Mae Min Bon	Kyaw Htet Aung, Nyi Htut Khaung, Banyar Phone Pyae, Chaw Yadanar, Yadanar Bo, Htet Htet Htun, Thin Thae Bo	Poe Ei Seint	Mahar	

== Political activities ==
Following the 2021 Myanmar coup d'état, she participated in the anti-coup movement both in person at rallies and through social media. Denouncing the military coup, she took part in protests, starting in February. She joined the "We Want Justice" three-finger salute movement. The movement was launched on social media, and many celebrities have joined the movement.

On 2 April 2021, warrants for her arrest were issued under Section 505 (a) of the penal code by the State Administration Council for speaking out against the military coup. Along with several other celebrities, she was charged with calling for participation in the Civil Disobedience Movement (CDM) and damaging the state's ability to govern, with supporting the Committee Representing Pyidaungsu Hluttaw, and with generally inciting the people to disturb the peace and stability of the nation.

She has been arrested by the Terrorists on 13 April 2021. Her aunt, Eaindra Kyaw Zin and her uncle Pyay Ti Oo, were also arrested at their home on 9 April 2021. She was released on the evening of June 30, 2021.
