= Dagon University =

University in Yangon, Myanmar

Coordinates: 16°54′47″N 96°12′44″E

- ဒဂုံ တက္ကသိုလ်
- Seal of Dagon University
- Motto: Born to be the outstanding generation
- Type: Public
- Established: 1993; 33 years ago
- Rector: Dr.Thar Htun Maung
- Students: 60,000
- Location: North Dagon, Yangon; Yangon Region, Myanmar
- Website: dagonuniversity.edu.mm

Dagon University (Burmese: ဒဂုံ တက္ကသိုလ် [dəɡòʊɰ̃ tɛʔkəθò]), located in North Dagon, Yangon, is one of the largest universities in Myanmar. The university, established in 1993, offers bachelor's and master's degrees in liberal arts and sciences to full-time, part-time and online students. Dagon University also offers a full-time four-year law degree program. The university's 1,582-acre (6.40 km^{2}) campus on the outskirts of Yangon is one of the largest campuses in the country.

== History ==
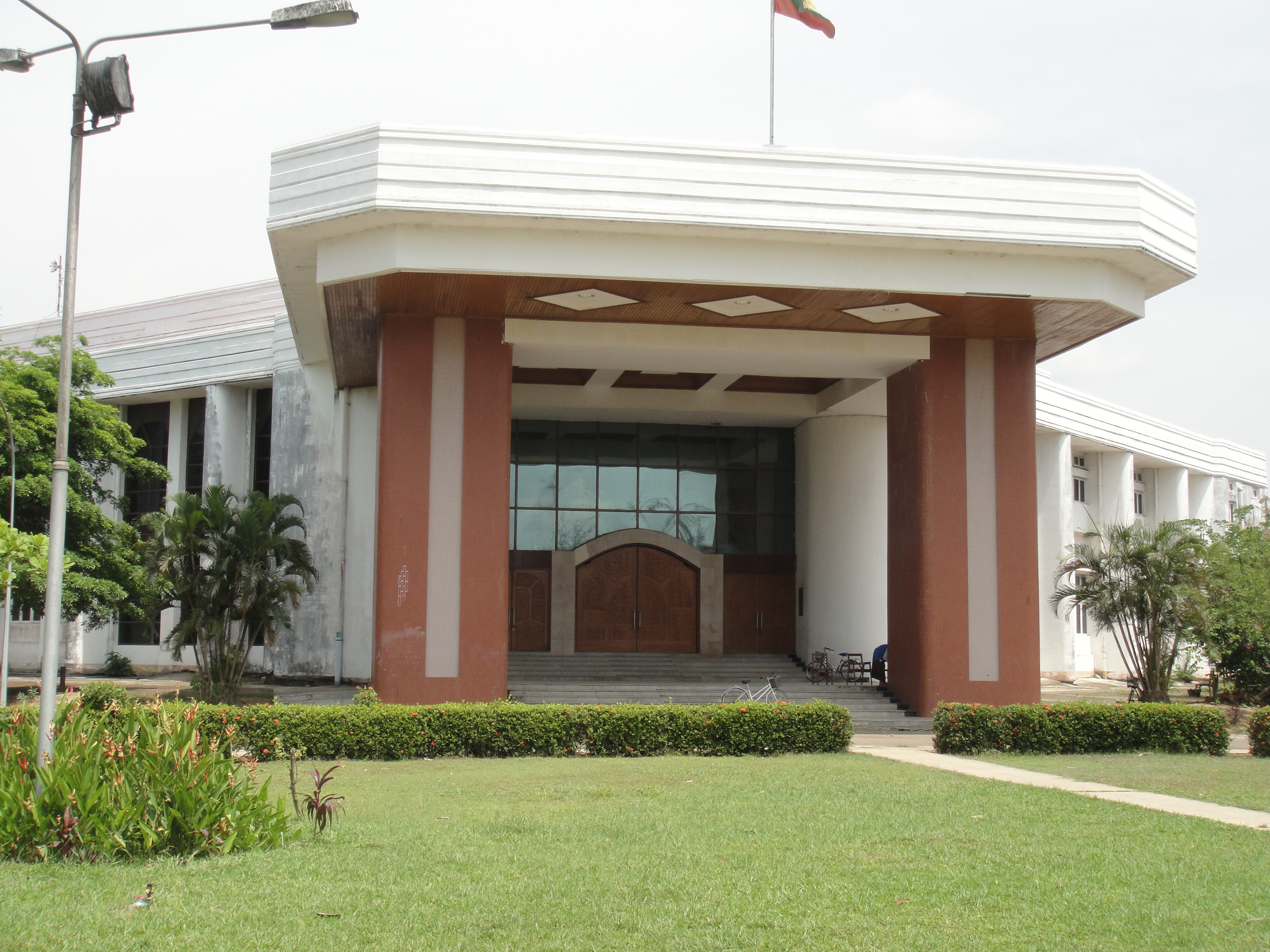
Convocation Hall

Dagon University was opened in 1993 in North Dagon in the northeastern corner of Yangon to serve students from eastern Yangon districts. The move was widely believed to be part of the Burmese military government's plan to disperse university students across many universities and colleges around the country. Students who would have attended Yangon University now have to attend Dagon University or East Yangon University in Thanlyin, southeast of Yangon.

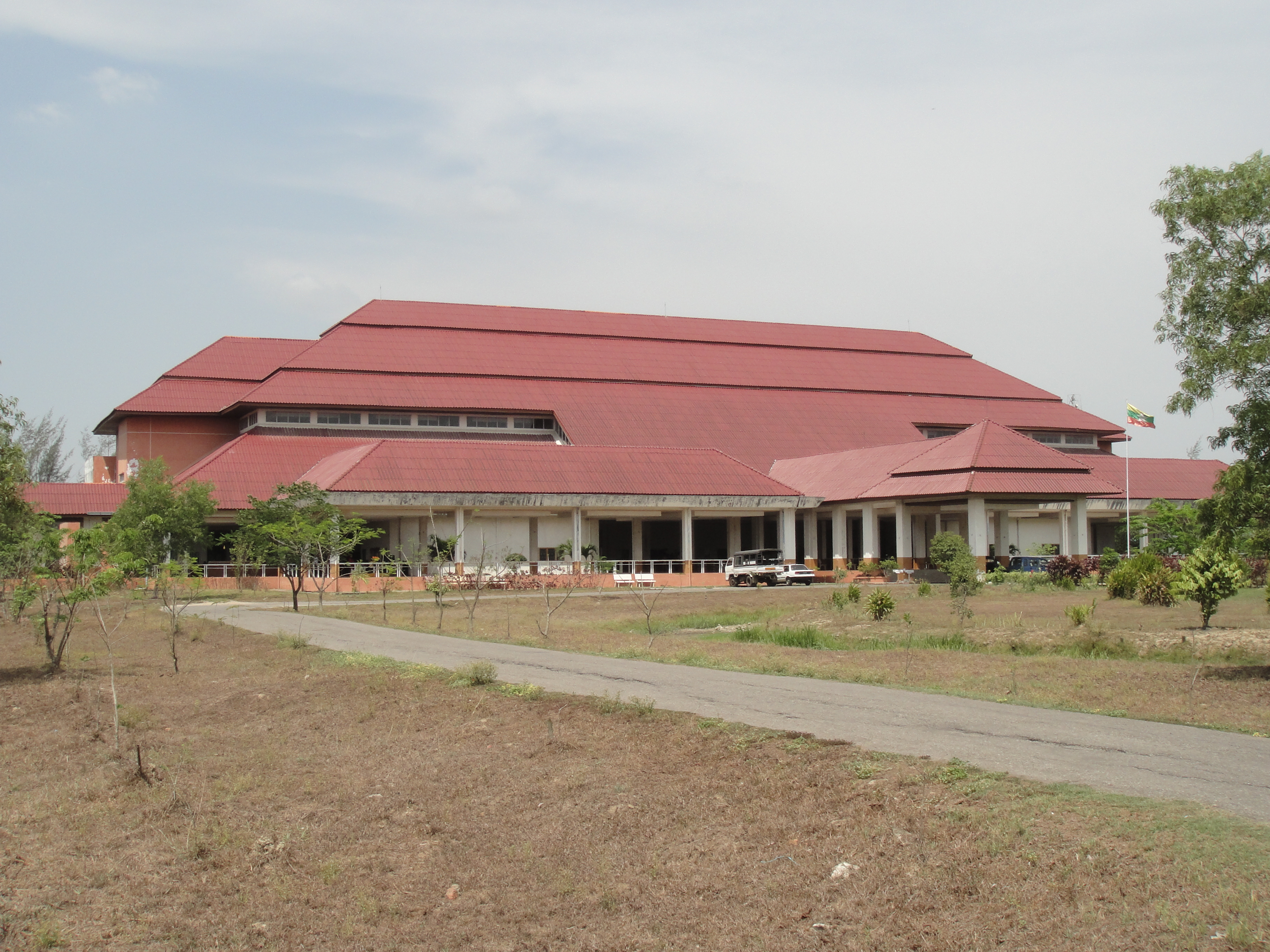
Dagon student affairs main building houses combo-department Treasuary, Exams, Staffs

The university and all other arts and science universities in the country were closed down from December 1996 to July 2000, following student demonstrations in Yangon.

== Programs ==
Classified as an Arts and Science university in the Burmese university education system, Dagon University offers bachelor's and master's degree programs in common liberal arts and sciences disciplines. Its regular Bachelor of Arts (BA) and Bachelor of Science (BSc) programs take four years to complete. The honors degree programs BA (Hons) and BSc (Hons) as well as the law program each take five years. The university also offers an online program.

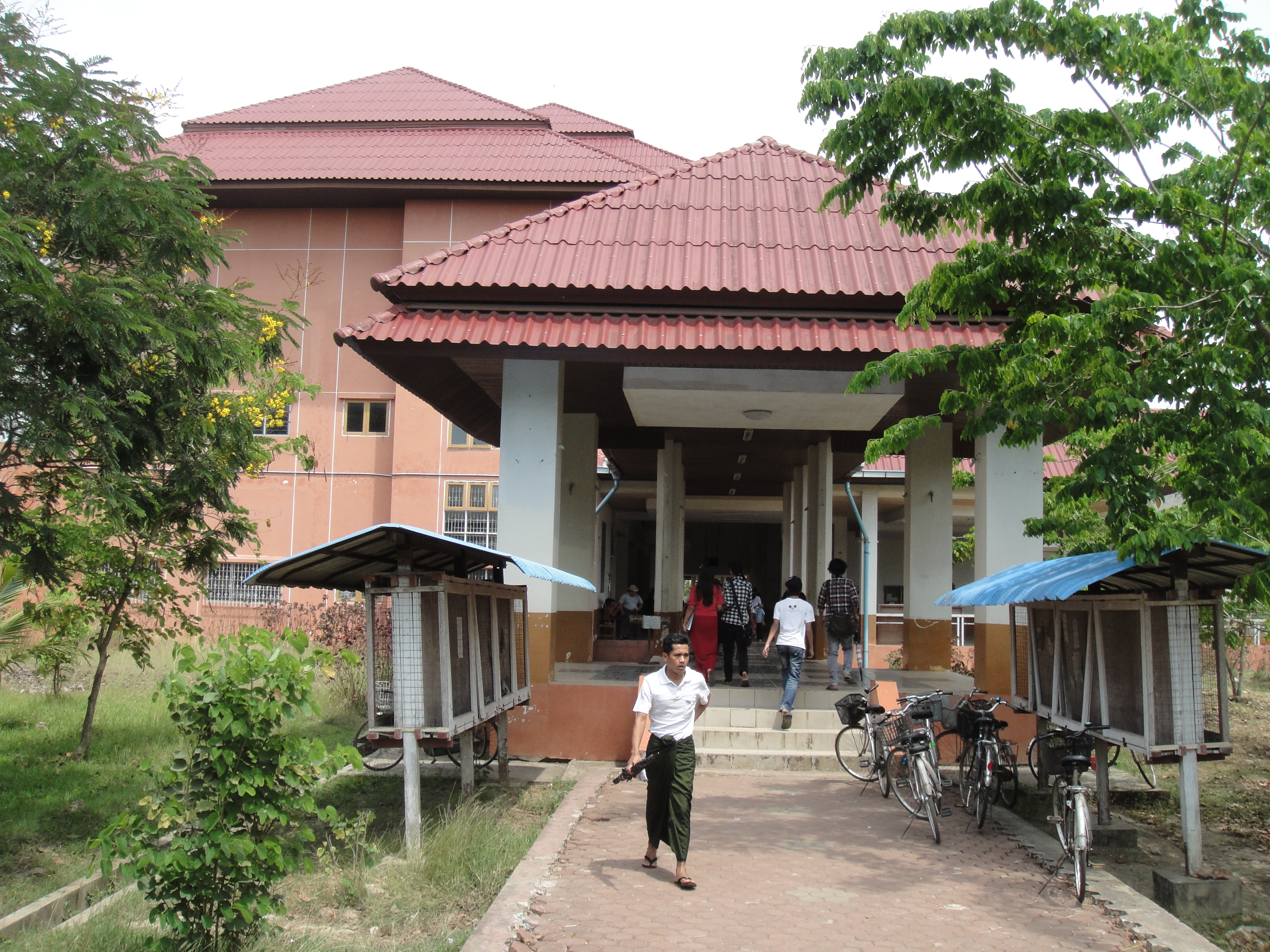
Treasury hall

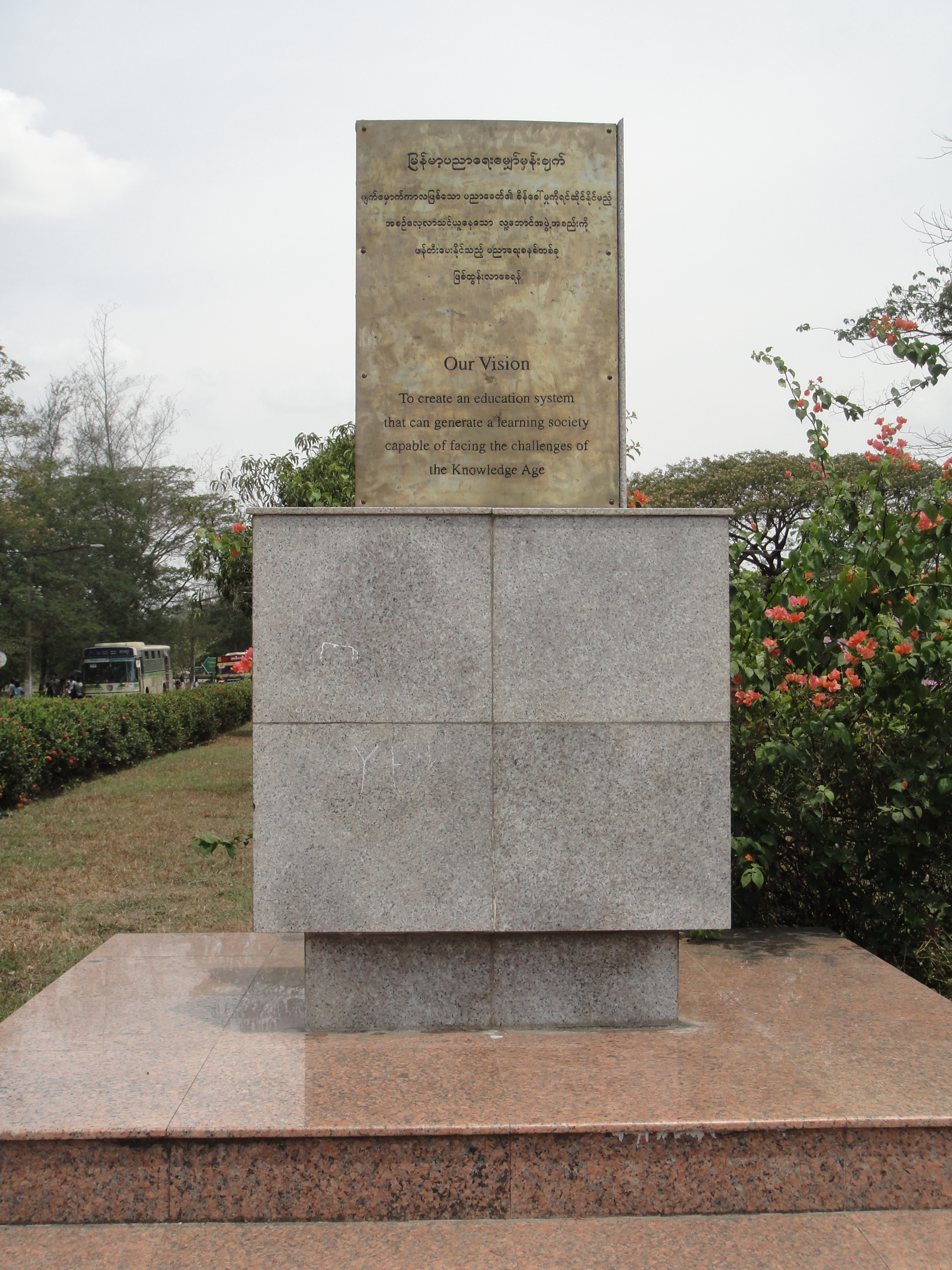
Stone mast

Program	Bachelor's	Master's	Doctorate
Anthropology	BA	MA, M.Res	
Archeology	BA	MA, M.Res	
Burmese	BA	MA, M.Res	
Biochemistry	BSc		
Biotechnology	BSc		
Botany	BSc	MSc, M.Res	
Chemistry	BSc	MSc, M.Res	
Computer Science	BSc		
Creative Writing	BA		
English	BA	MA, M.Res	
Geography	BA	MA	
Geology	BSc	MSc, M.Res	
History	BA	MA, M.Res	
Hydrology	BSc		
Industrial Chemistry	BSc	MSc, M.Res	
International Relations	BA	MA, M.Res	
Law	LLB	LLM, M.Res	
Mathematics	BSc	MSc, M.Res	
Meteorology	BSc		
Microbiology	BSc		
Myanmar Studies	BA		
Nuclear Physics	BSc		
Oriental Studies	BA	MA, M.Res	
Physics	BSc	MSc, M.Res	
Philosophy	BA	MA, M.Res	
Psychology	BA	MA, M.Res	
Sport Science	BSc		
Zoology	BSc	MSc, M.Res	

== Transport ==
A new 4.96-mile (7.98 km) rail extension was completed in 2006. Trains travel along the 12.21-mile (19.65 km) route from Yangon Central Railway Station to the university, via Togyaunggalay Station, 10 times a day from 5:25am to 5:35pm. About 4000 students use the rail service daily.

== Administration ==
=== Current ===
Rectors have included:

- Dr. Thar Htun Maung
- Dr. Nunu Yi (Pro -Rector)
- Dr. Hteik Tin Han (Pro -Rector)
- Dr. Myo Min (Pro -Rector)

=== List of rectors (1993-present) ===
- U Kaung Nyut (1993- 1998)
- Dr. Maung Thin (1998- 2004)
- U Kyaw Myint Oo (2005- 2007)
- U Sun (2007- 2011)
- Dr. Hla Htay (2012- 2016)
- Dr. Aye Aye Tun (2011- 2017)
- Dr. Win Maung (2017- 2019)
- Dr. Thar Htun Maung (2021- Present)

== Gallery ==
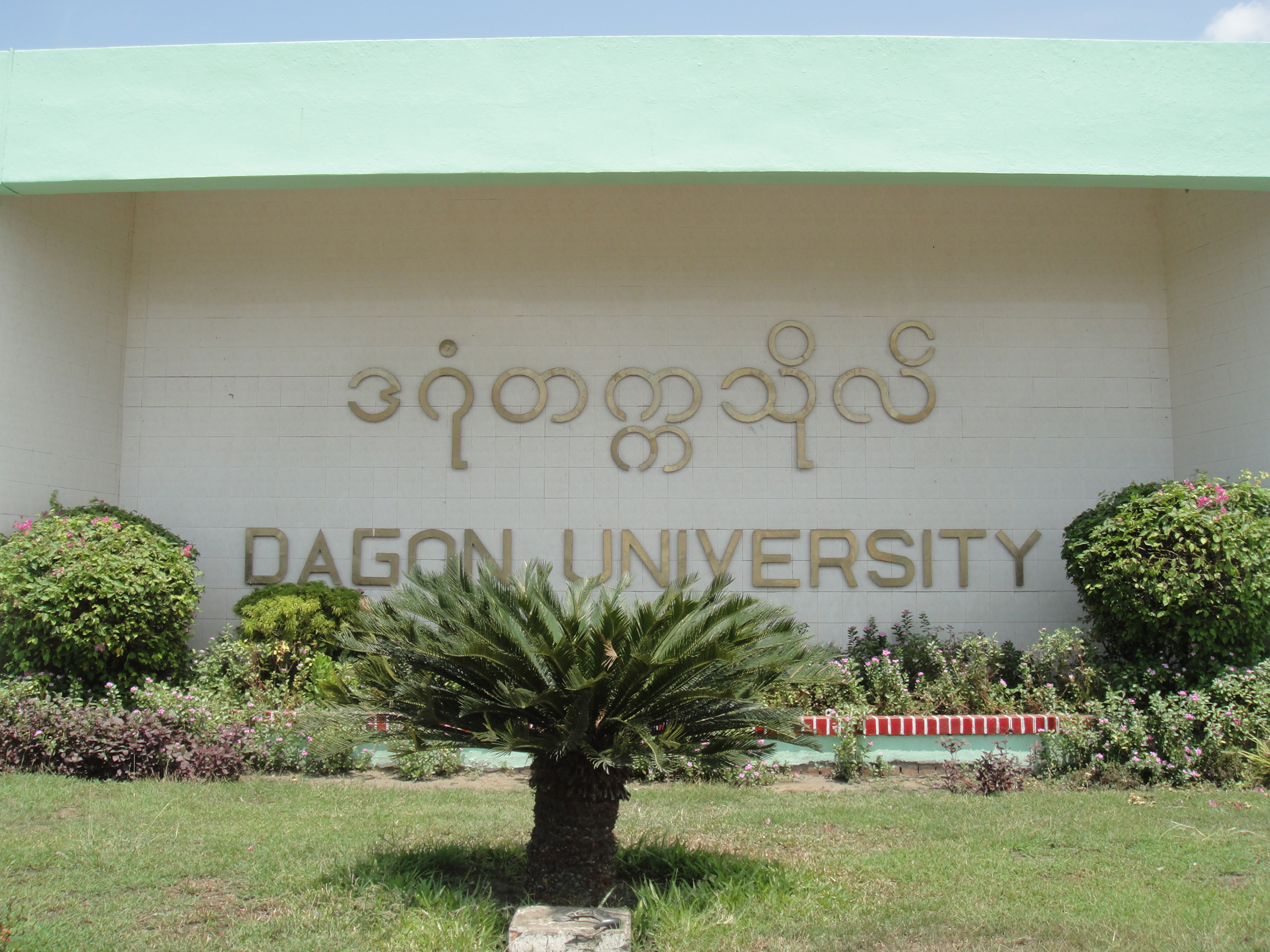
Entrance

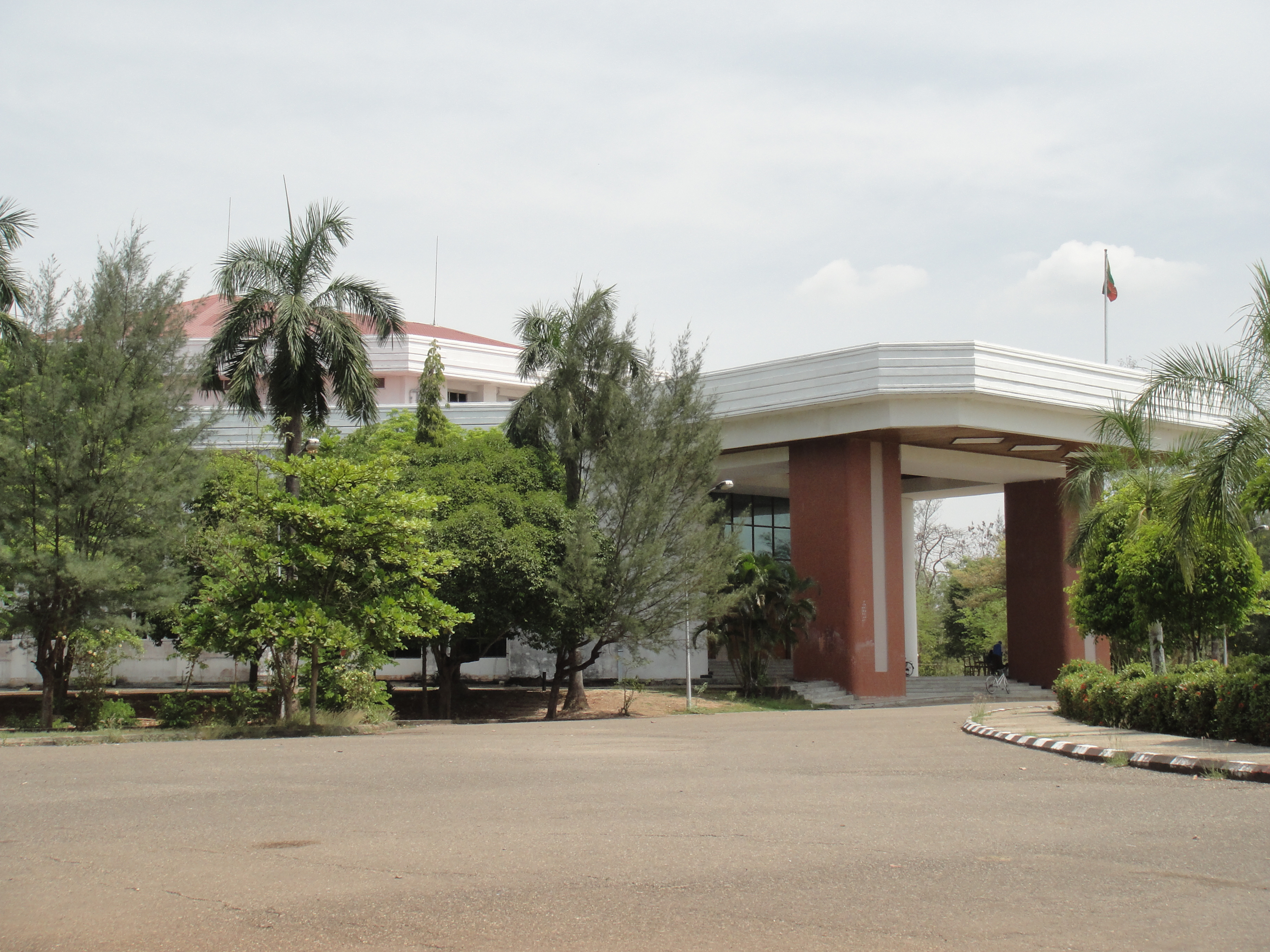
Convocation Hall (ဘွဲ့နှင်းသဘင် အဆောက်အအုံ)

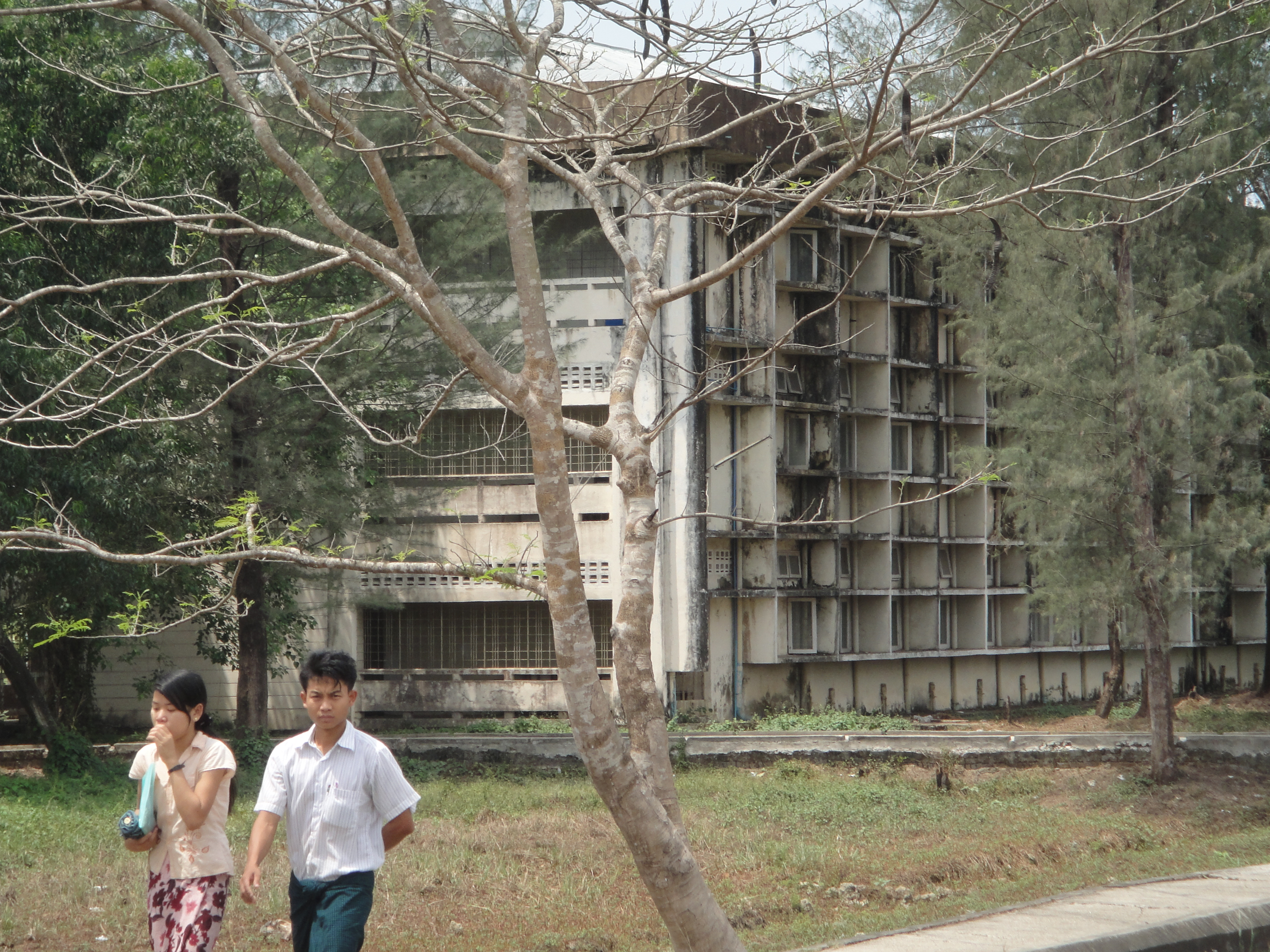
Theater Building (စာသင်ဆောင်)

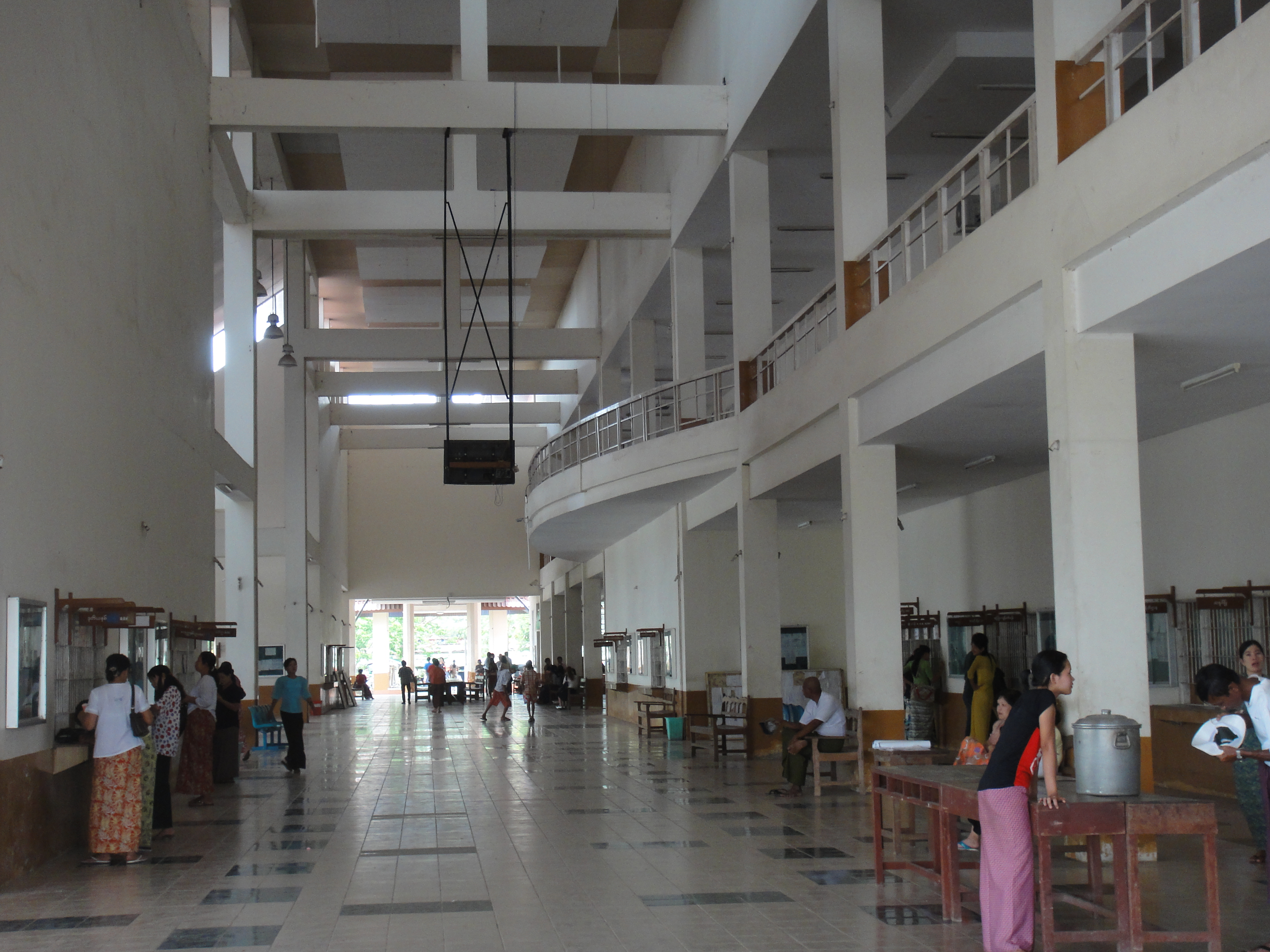
Offices blocks (သင်တန်းရေးရာ)
