= Tyron Bejay =

Burmese actor & model (born 1993)

- တိုင်ရွန်ဘီဂျေး
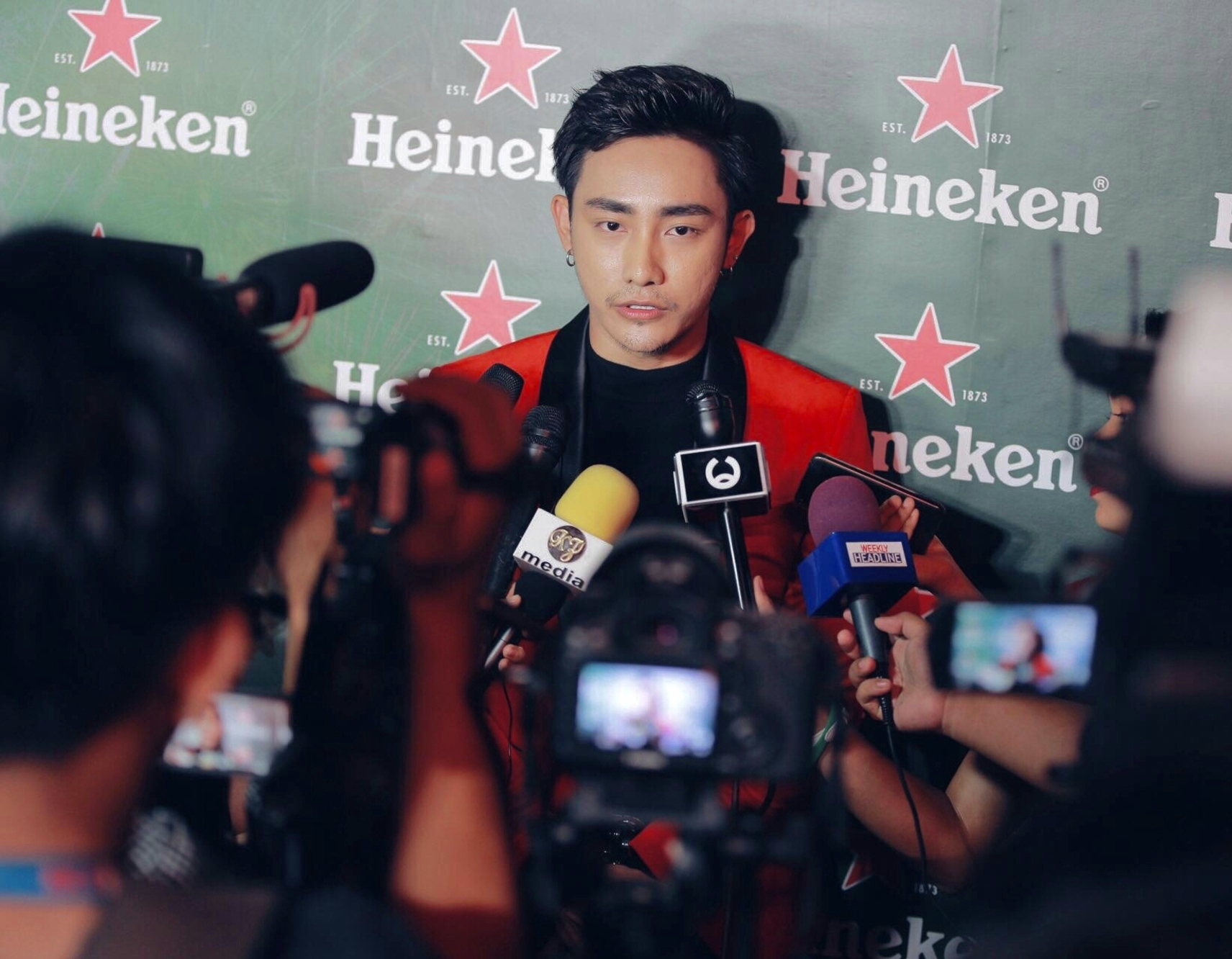
- Tyron in 2019
- Born: Win Pyae Aung; 27 November 1993 (age 32); Thanbyuzayat, Mon State, Myanmar
- Other names: Ah Win, Tyron
- Education: Bago University
- Occupation: Model • Actor
- Years active: 2014–present
- Height: 5 ft 9 in (1.75 m)
- Parent(s): Win Tint; Myint Myint Thein

Tyron Bejay (Burmese: တိုင်ရွန်ဘီဂျေ, born Win Pyae Aung on 27 November 1993) is a Burmese actor and model. Commencing his journey in the entertainment industry in 2014 as a runway model, Tyron's prominence escalated following his role in the 2018 crime series It was on Yesterday 2.

== Early life and education ==
Tyron Bejay was born on 27 November 1993 in Thanbyuzayat, Mon State, Myanmar to parent Win Tint and his wife Thein Thein Myint. His family moved to Bago when he was only five years old. He is the youngest child among three siblings, having two older sisters. He attended high school at Basic Education High School No. 3 Bago. He was educated in Bago University, majoring in physics.

== Career ==
Starting in 2014, Tyron kicked off his entertainment journey as a model, taking part in numerous advertising events and runway shows. He later entered male model competitions and won the title of Mr. Aung Thamardi. Subsequently, he received offers for TV and films.

In 2017, Tyron signed a contract with Tun Production for a total of 20 films. In 2018, he took his first steps into acting with the thriller series It was on Yesterday 2. His depiction of the character received acclaim from fans, who appreciated his performance and how he interpreted the role.

In May 2017, he assumed the role of the main antagonist in the feature film Kyway, starring alongside Hlwan Paing and Ei Chaw Po. The movie was adapted from the novel "Pyaw Tine Yone Tak Pote Thin Nyo" by Min Lu. Not long after that, he had his first appearance on the big screen in 2018 with Ta Ku Latt, and followed by his role in the action film Thadi Anayel Shi The. Subsequently, he took on a leading role in the drama Shwe Min Tha Mee Nae Lu Lain (Princess and Crook), which was broadcast on Myawaddy TV on 23 March 2018.

In 2019, he assumed the male lead role in the dramatic film Puyi Tha, sharing the screen with Nay Chi Oo and Cham Min Ye Htut. His depiction of Lu Zaw in the film garnered both critical acclaim and favorable reviews, propelling him to heightened popularity. He has been co-hosting a travel documentary Let's Go alongside fellow artists.

Tyron took on starring roles in several films, namely Old Gangster, Ser Oak Gyi Si Yin Chat, Nga Mone Tae A Kha Yar, and Joe Yoke.

== Personal life ==
Filmography

=== Television series ===
Year	English title	Myanmar title	Role	Network	Notes
2018	It was on Yesterday 2	မနေ့ကဖြစ်သည် ၂	Khant Htal	MRTV-4	
2018	Shwe Min Tha Mee Nae Lu Lain	ရွှေမင်းသမီးနဲ့လူလိမ်	Gin	Myawaddy TV	
2020	Legends of Warriors	တစစ်တမက်ကိုယ်နှင့်သက်ကို	Phay Khin (youth life)	MRTV-4	
2022	Bad Daughter	သမီးဆိုး	Phone Nyan Sin	Mahar	
2023	Laung	လောင်	Khun Zai	Mahar	
2024	Other Side Of The Heart	နှလုံးသားရဲ့အခြားတစ်ဖက်		M Channel Myanmar	
2024	Hsaung Taw Kue	ဆောင်တော်ကူး		Mahar Tv	
2024	Thu Nge Chin Mi Htwe	သူငယ်ချင်းမိထွေး		M Channel Myanmar	
2025	Once Upon A Time Gaw Yan Gyi	တစ်ခါတုန်းကဂေါ်ယံဂျီ		For You Cinema	
2025	Veneus' Luck	နတ်သမီးနက္ခတ်		M Channel Myanmar	
2026	Yin Hnint A Mya	ရင်နှင့်အမျှ		MRTV-4 & Hey Play	
2026	Zombie Plaza	ဇွန်ဘီပလာဇာ	Phoe Thae	On Theatres	ရုံတင်ကားကြီး
