= Nyein Thaw =

Burmese actor and model (born 1993)

- ညိမ်းသော်
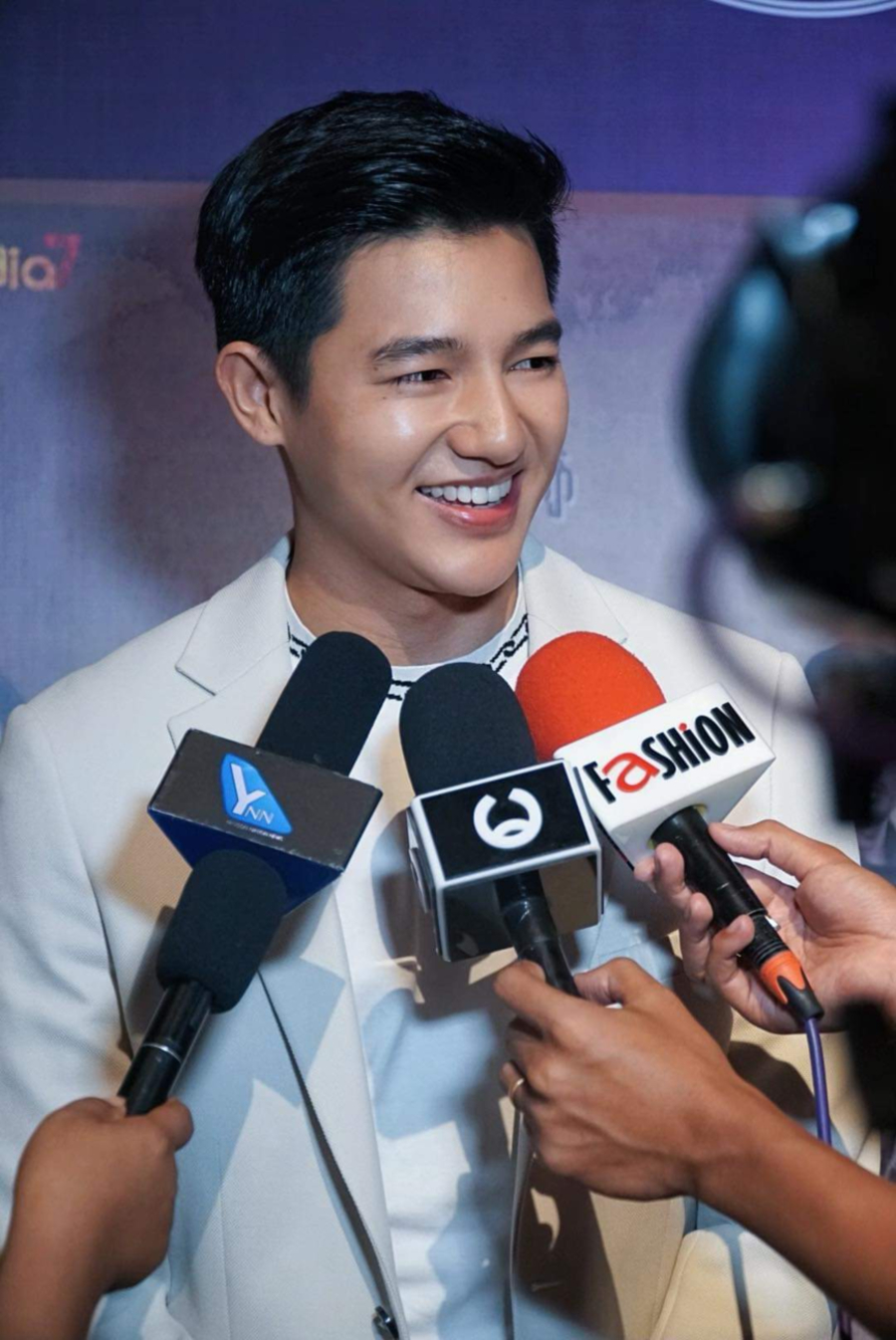
- Nyein Thaw in 2020
- Born: Nyein Nyein Thaw; 13 April 1993 (age 32); Monywa, Myanmar
- Education: Monywa University
- Occupations: Actor; model
- Years active: 2014–present
- Height: 175 cm (5 ft 9 in)

Nyein Thaw (Burmese: ညိမ်းသော်; born 13 April 1993 as Nyein Nyein Thaw) is a Burmese actor and model. He gained popularity after starring in the 2017 thriller film Nya which brought him wider recognition.

== Early life and education ==
Nyein Thaw was born on 13 April 1993 in Monywa. He is the second child among five siblings. He studied at Monywa University, majoring in Law for second year.

== Career ==
=== 2014–2016: Beginnings as a model ===
He joined John Lwin's model training Stars Int'l Models Agency in 2014. Since then, he took professional training in modelling and catwalk. He began his entertainment career as a runway model as part of the Stars Int'l Models Agency with countless commercial model shows and runways that had been walked on. He then competed in the male model contest Mr. ASNI 2014 and became the winner. Then came the offers for TV commercials and appeared in many TV commercial advertisements. His hardwork as a model and acting in TV commercials was noticed by the film industry and soon, film casting offers came rolling in.

=== 2017–present: Acting debut and rising popularity ===
Nyein Thaw made his acting debut with a main role in thriller film Nya (Night) which screened in Myanmar cinemas on 28 July 2017 and became one of the highest-grossing films in Myanmar and positive reviews for his portrayal of the character. He then starred in mini web series The Family Diary, produced by Samsung Myanmar which released on Samsung Myanmar's Facebook page in 2018.

In late 2018, he was cast in romantic drama Yin Kwin Shin Tann, where he played the main role with Hein Wai Yan, Aye Wutyi Thaung and Thun Sett, aired on Channel 9 on 28 May 2019. He then portrayed the male lead in thriller drama Ah Saung, alongside Su Htet Kahtay, Su Htat, Sao Yoon Waddy Oo and Phyo Pa Pa Htoo, aired on Fortune TV on 1 June 2019. In 2020, he was cast in a leading role in drama films Hnin Pwint Say Yar and Oo Tu Mhar Tae Saung.

== Brand ambassadorships ==
In 2019, he started working as a brand ambassador for MGOU.

== Filmography ==
=== Film (Cinema) ===
| Year | Film | Burmese title | Note |
|---|---|---|---|
| 2017 | Nya | ည | |
| 2020 | Oo Tu Mhar Tae Saung | ဥတုမှားတဲ့ဆောင်း | |

=== Television series ===
| Year | English title | Myanmar title | Network | Notes |
|---|---|---|---|---|
| 2018 | The Family Diary | | Samsung Myanmar | mini web series |
| 2019 | Yin Khwin Shin Tan | ရင်ခွင်ရှင်းတမ်း | Channel 9 | |
| 2019 | Ah Saung | အဆောင် | Fortune TV | |
| TBA | I Can See You | | | |
| TBA | Achit Ei Naunt Set Twel Ser Myat Nar | အချစ်၏နောက်ဆက်တွဲ စာမျက်နှာ | | |
| TBA | Sky Paper View | | | |
