= Nan Su Yati Soe =

- နန်းဆုရတီစိုး
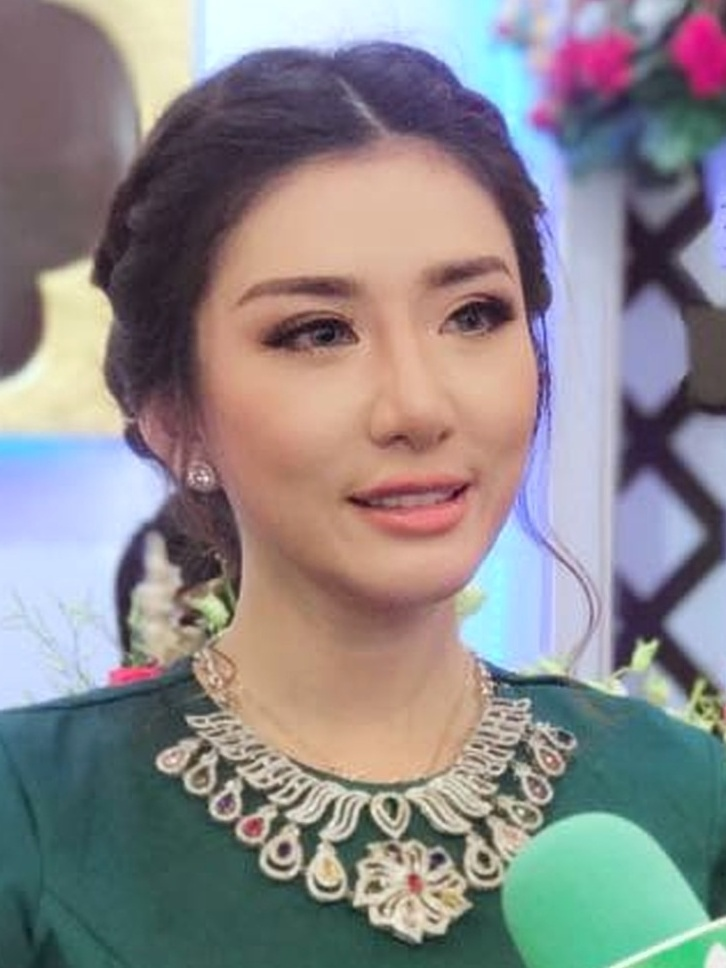
- Born: Nan Su Yati Soe; 18 September 1987 (age 39); Rangoon, Burma
- Education: University of Pharmacy, Yangon; University of Distance Education, Yangon
- Occupations: Actress; model; singer; songwriter; television host
- Height: 5 ft 5 in (1.65 m)
- Parents: Soe Lin; Tin Tin Win
- Musical career
- Genre: Pop
- Instruments: Vocals; piano; guitar
- Years active: 2004–present
- Website: www.nansuyatisoe.com

Nan Su Yati Soe (Burmese: နန်းဆုရတီစိုး; also spelt Nansu Yati Soe, born 18 September 1987) is a Burmese actress, model, singer and TV host who has achieved fame and success as an actress and singer. Throughout her successful career, she has acted in over 200 films and released two solo albums.

== Early life and education ==
Nansu Yati Soe was born on 18 September 1987 in Yangon, Myanmar. She is of ethnic Shan-Burmese descent. She is the middle daughter of Soe Lin, a businessman and chairman of Echo Trading Co., Ltd, and his wife Tin Tin Win. Nansu has an elder brother and a younger brother. She attended high school at Basic Education High School No. 1 Dagon. She matriculated and joined University of Pharmacy, Yangon. And graduated B.A (English) in distance education at University of Distance Education, Yangon in 2017.

== Career ==
Nansu Yati Soe initiated her modeling journey during Grade 10, featuring in a Biosoft shampoo television commercial. Subsequently, she graced the covers of numerous local magazines and journals. Nansu has showcased her versatility as an advertising model in over 100 commercial advertisements, including notable brands such as DORU whitening cream, Mistine Lipstick, Ginvera shampoo, Wax One, Gionee Mobile Phone, Mandalay FM, and Sky Net DTH, among others. Nansu has collaborated with numerous international model agencies and marketing firms from Thailand, Korea, the Philippines, Indonesia, Hong Kong, Singapore, and the USA to promote their international products.

Nansu officially ventured into the entertainment industry in 2004. She made her acting debut with a prominent role in the 2004 film Moe Louk Gyi Chit Tal, co-starring alongside Lu Min. Following this, she portrayed the female lead in the 2005 film Hna Lone Thar Yae Ashin Thakhin (The Lord of Heart), again alongside Lu Min. The film's significant contribution to Nansu Yati Soe's growing recognition in the industry. Nansu made her big-screen debut in the 2009 film Hot Shock 2, appearing alongside Moe Aung Yin, Thu Htoo San, Eaindra Kyaw Zin, Moht Moht Myint Aung, and Thinzar Wint Kyaw. The film enjoyed immense commercial success, emerging as the most watched Burmese film during its release. Throughout her acting career, Nansu has starred in over 10 big-screen films and has appeared in over 200 direct-to-video films.

In 2016, Nansu represented Myanmar at the Shanghai International Film Festival. Additionally, she participated in the "Asean Celebrity Explore Quest Malaysia" (ACEQM) event in Indonesia, alongside renowned celebrities and models from Southeast Asian countries. During the event, Nansu and Paing Takhon performed the U Shwe Yoe and Daw Moe dance.

In 2017, Nansu starred in the horror series Ghost Hunter, portraying the leading role alongside Kyaw Kyaw Bo, Myat Thu Kyaw, and Nwe Darli Tun. The series aired on MNTV in 2017.

Nansu also serves as a TV host for various local TV stations. She has appeared in numerous talk show programs and reality shows, including "Champion of Dance" for MRTV-4, as well as the weekly programs "Designers' Design" and "Mailbox" for Myawaddy TV. Additionally, she has been featured in many entertainment and infotainment TV programs for Sky Net, reaching an audience of over 50 million people in Myanmar.

== Music career ==
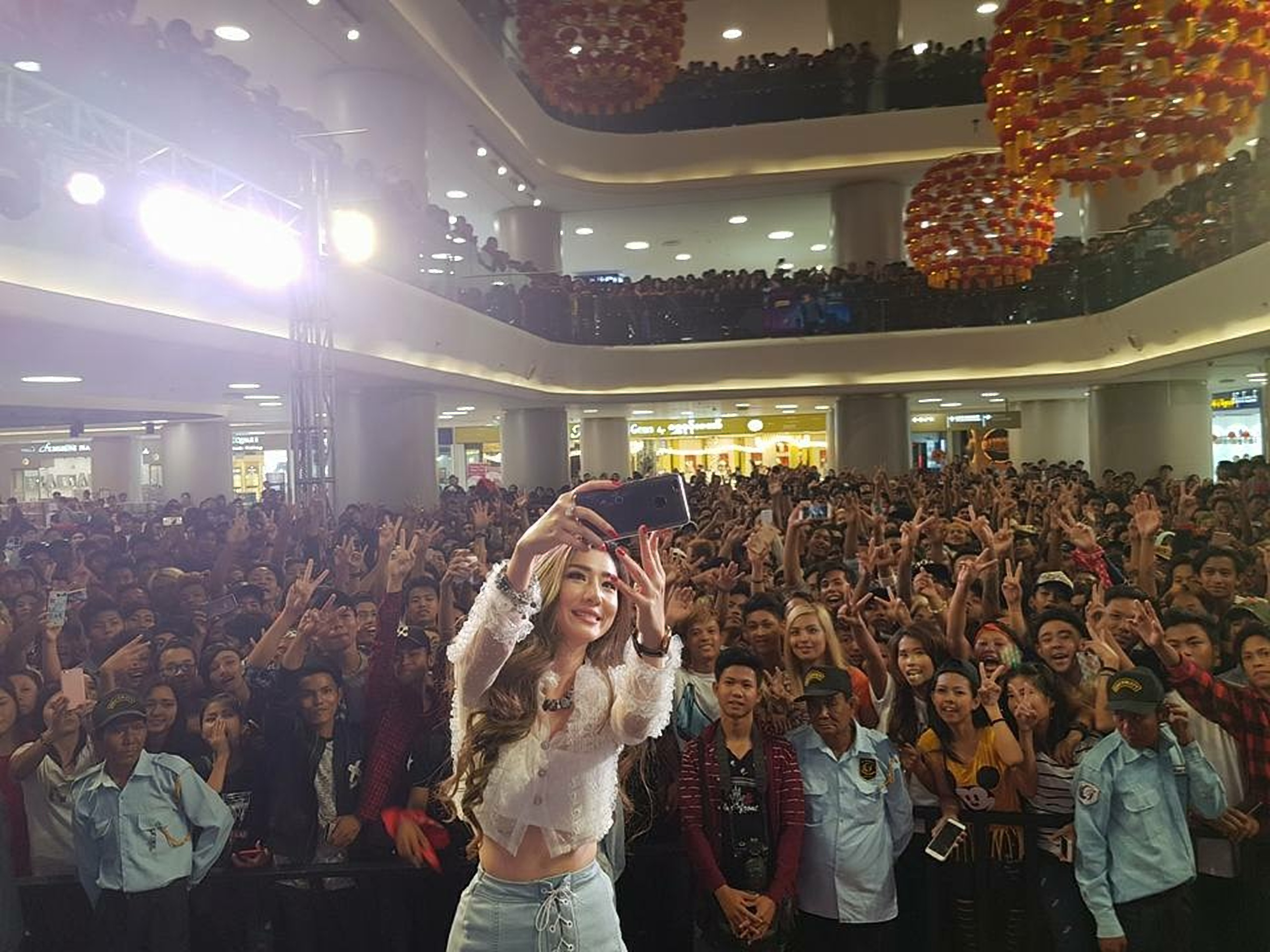
Nan Su is performing in a concert with her fans

Nansu ventured into her music career while still pursuing acting, releasing her debut single "May May Su Late Mal" in 2005, which garnered initial recognition from her fans. In 2007, Nansu began working towards producing and releasing her solo album. She launched her debut solo studio album titled "Moe Ma Myin Lay Ma Myin" (Unaware of My Surroundings) in 2008. The album achieved remarkable success, selling over 2 million copies in Myanmar. Songs from her first album, including the new version of "May May Su Late Mal", along with "Kaw La Har La" and "Ngar Yin Tway Khon Nay Loh", became countrywide hits, catapulting her to nationwide recognition. Following the release of her solo album, Nansu engaged in stage performances and participated in numerous concerts across Myanmar. Additionally, the video album for "Moe Ma Myin Lay Ma Myin" was released in 2010.

In 2013, Nansu released her second solo studio album titled Shae Sat Thwar Mhar Pal (Forward), which produced several major hits. The album's success led to numerous records in the music industry, with over 10,000 copies sold within just four months of its release. The video album was released in 2015.

Nansu performed during the opening ceremonies of the 2013 Southeast Asian Games held in Naypyidaw on 22 December 2013. In 2016, she released the single "Moe Thachin" (Rain Song) on her Facebook page. In 2017, she released the single "Yuu Aung Chit Ya Thu" on her Facebook page to celebrate her birthday. The song garnered 1.5 million views within 24 hours and reached 4 million views in just 4 days.

On 3 October 2018, she released the single song titled "May May Su Mhar Soe Loh" MV on her Facebook page, garnering 1 million views within 24 hours and reaching 2 million views in just 4 days.

== Brand ambassadorships ==
In February 2018, Nansu served as a brand ambassador for Shangpree Cosmetics, and she also held a brand ambassadorship contract with Samsung. In January 2016, she was appointed as an ambassador for Hope For Children, aiming to advocate for the development of children and the reduction of child mortality rates.

== Personal life ==
Nansu was in a relationship with hip hop singer G Fatt in 2017, but they broke up in November 2019.

== Filmography ==
=== Film (cinema) ===
- A Lann Zayar (2011)
- A Lann Lun A Lun Lann (2012)
- A Mike Sar (2013)
- A Lann Zayar 2 (2013)

=== Film ===
- Over 200 films

== Discography ==
=== Solo albums ===
- Moe Ma Myin Lay Ma Myin (Unaware of my surroundings) (မိုးမမြင်လေမမြင်) (2008)
- Shae Sat Thwar Mhar Pal (Forward) (ရှေ့ဆက်သွားမှာပဲ) (2013)

=== Singles ===
- May May Su Late Mal (2005)
- Moe Thachin (2016)
- Yuu Aung Chit Ya Thu (2017)
- May May Su Mhar Soe Loh (2018)
