= Nwe Darli Tun =

Burmese actress and model (born 1987)

- နွယ်ဒါလီထွန်း
- Born: Nwe Darli Tun; 25 July 1987 (age 39); Rangoon, Burma
- Education: Dagon University; Aldersgate College
- Occupations: Actress, Model
- Years active: 2012–present
- Height: 5 ft 4 in (1.63 m)
- Parent(s): Tun Ei; Nwe Nwe Oo

Nwe Darli Tun (Burmese: နွယ်ဒါလီထွန်း; also spelt Nwe Darli Htun, born 25 July 1987) is a Burmese actress and model. She began her entertainment career in 2012 as a photo model. She then made her acting debut in 2015, and gained popularity after starring in the 2017 thriller series Ghost Hunter which brought her wider recognition.

== Early life and education ==
Nwe Darli Tun was born on 25 July 1987 in Yangon, Myanmar to parent Tun Ei and his wife Nwe Nwe Oo. She is the youngest child among four siblings, having three older sister. She finished her primary and secondary education in Yangon. She graduated with B.Sc (Mathematics) from Dagon University, and Master of Business Administrations from Aldersgate College in Philippines.

== Career ==
=== 2012–2014: Beginning as a model ===
In 2012, she competed in the Queen Oramin F pageant and became the winner. Since then, she has been working as a model. Then came the offers for TV commercials and then magazine cover photos. Her hard work as a model and acting in commercials was noticed by the film industry and soon, movie casting offers came rolling in.

=== 2015–2018: Acting debut and recognition ===
Nwe made her acting debut with a leading role in the film Kawei Choe Tae Phel, alongside Zay Ye Htet in 2015. She then starred in her second film Khayann Yaung Set Thwe Hmu, alongside Zay Ye Htet. The same year, she starred in the films Bad Boys and Sate Yae Anyi.

In 2017, Nwe starred in her first television series Ghost Hunter, where she played the leading role with Kyaw Kyaw Bo, Myat Thu Kyaw, Nan Su Yati Soe, aired on MNTV in 2017 which led to increased popularity for her. In 2018, she starred in the comedy drama Mingalar Shi Tae Ayet, alongside Myint Myat, Nay Dway and Aye Wutyi Thaung. The same year, she co-starred with Aung Myint Myat, Myat Thu Aung and Gonyi Aye Kyaw in drama Hospital Diary, aired on MNTV in 2018.

=== 2019–present: Breaking into the big screen ===
In 2019, she filmed her first big-screen film Sitt Kar, alongside Nay Toe, Kyaw Kyaw Bo, Nay Htoo Naing and Aye Myat Thu. The same year, she was cast in the big-screen film Kyal Ma Shi Tae Kaung Kin (Starless sky ), where she played the main role with Phupoom Pongpanu, Nay Toe, Sai Sai Kham Hlaing, Tun Tun, Emi Takei, Aye Myat Thu and Moe Set Wine. The film is the collaboration with Thailand.

== Brand ambassadorships ==
She was appointed as brand ambassador for Fair & Lovely from 2012 to 2013.

== Political activities ==
Following the 2021 Myanmar coup d'état, Nwe Darli Tun was active in the anti-coup movement both in person at rallies and through social media. Denouncing the military coup, she has taken part in protests since February. She joined the "We Want Justice" three-finger salute movement. The movement was launched on social media, and many celebrities joined the movement.

On 4 April 2021, warrants for her arrest were issued under section 505 (a) of the penal code by the State Administration Council for speaking out against the military coup. Along with several other celebrities, she was charged with calling for participation in the Civil Disobedience Movement (CDM) and damaging the state's ability to govern, with supporting the Committee Representing Pyidaungsu Hluttaw, and with generally inciting the people to disturb the peace and stability of the nation.

== Filmography ==
=== Film (Cinema) ===
- Sitt Kar (TBA)
- Kyal Ma Shi Tae Kaung Kin (TBA)

=== Film ===
Year	Film	Co-Stars	Note
2015	Kawei Choe Tae Phel	Zay Ye Htet	
2015	Khayann Yaung Set Thwe Hmu	Zay Ye Htet	
2015	Bad Boys	Zay Ye Htet, Han Lin Thant	Uncredited remake of True Friend.
2015	Sate Yae Anyi	Zay Ye Htet, Mone	
2016	Pat Pat Set Set Amone	Zay Ye Htet, Thun Sett	
2018	Kyal Kalay Yae Kaung Kin	Zay Ye Htet	

=== Television series ===
Year	English title	Myanmar title	Role	Network	Notes
2017	Ghost Hunter	တစ္ဆေပျောက်ကြော်ငြာ	Ya Nant	MNTV	
2018	Mingalar Shi Tae A Yat	မင်္ဂလာရှိတဲ့အရပ်	Sabal	MNTV	
2018	Hospital Diary	ဆေးရုံမှတ်တမ်း	Than Lwin Cho	MRTV	
2019	Athel Kwel Thardu	အသဲကွဲသာဓု	Thit Khet	Sky Net	
