= A Mike Sar =

2013 Burmese Film

- Film Poster
- Burmese: အမိုက်စား
- Directed by: Ko Zaw (Ar Yone Oo)
- Screenplay by: Nay Soe Thaw; Pyinsaman Di Yine
- Story by: Ohn Win
- Produced by: Ma Aye Aye Win
- Starring: Khant Si Thu; Soe Myat Thuzar; Thu Htoo San; Thinzar Wint Kyaw; Kyaw Kyaw Bo; Soe Pyae Thazin; Moe Aung Yin; Wutt Hmone Shwe Yi; Moe Moe (singer); Nan Su Yati Soe
- Cinematography: Kyauk Phyu (Padaythar)
- Edited by: Zaw Min
- Music by: Win Ko
- Production company: Lucky Seven Film Production
- Release date: August 16, 2013
- Running time: 116 minutes
- Country: Myanmar
- Language: Burmese

A Mike Sar (Burmese: အမိုက်စား) is a 2013 Burmese romantic-comedy film, directed by Ko Zaw (Ar Yone Oo) starring Khant Si Thu, Soe Myat Thuzar, Thu Htoo San, Thinzar Wint Kyaw, Kyaw Kyaw Bo, Soe Pyae Thazin, Moe Aung Yin, Wutt Hmone Shwe Yi, Moe Moe (singer) and Nan Su Yati Soe.

== Cast ==
- Khant Si Thu as U Lin Khaung
- Soe Myat Thuzar as Daw Khin Khin Kyawt
- Thu Htoo San as Shwe Kyay Si
- Thinzar Wint Kyaw as Zar Zar
- Kyaw Kyaw Bo as Htun Nyunt
- Soe Pyae Thazin as Pyae Pyae
- Moe Aung Yin as Mandolin Lu
- Wutt Hmone Shwe Yi as Hmone Hmone
- Moe Moe (singer) as Banjo Lu
- Nan Su Yati Soe as Yati
- Aung Lwin as U Ba Htwar
- Nwet Nwet San as Daw Sein Kyawt
