= Myanmar National Post =

- Type: Nationalist media
- Owner: Naung Taw Lay
- Founded: 2019
- Language: Burmese
- Website: mmnationalpost.com

Myanmar National Post (Burmese: မြန်မာနေရှင်နယ်ပို့စ်) is a nationalist media outlet. The outlet is known for publishing anti-Rohingya reports, farmers' rights and has been linked to the ultranationalist Buddhist organization Ma Ba Tha.

== History ==
Myanmar National Post was officially established in 2019 under a license from the Ministry of Information. It was founded by Naung Taw Lay, a prominent ultranationalist and leader of the anti-Rohingya movement in Myanmar. In the 2020s, the outlet is also locally known for reporting on illegal farmland seizures carried out by politically-backed organizations, and it has taken a stance in support of farmers' rights. During the National League for Democracy (NLD) government, the outlet opposed the use of the term "Rohingya" and consistently referred to the group as "Bengalis" in its reporting. It faced legal action related to this usage.

The outlet reported that the National League for Democracy (NLD) party was accused of election fraud following the 2020 Myanmar general election and claimed that the military was requested to intervene and stage a coup.

In the aftermath of the 2021 coup, the outlet shifted its focus to junta-related news and became one of the primary voices supporting the military regime. It has been accused of receiving backing from the ultranationalist Buddhist organization Ma Ba Tha. The journal is among the few pro-military media outlets permitted to attend military press conferences and granted special access to interview and verify information directly with military leaders. The outlet consistently labels the National League for Democracy (NLD), the National Unity Government (NUG), the People's Defense Forces (PDF), and allied Ethnic Armed Organizations (EAOs) as 'extremist terrorist groups'.

Pro-democracy media have alleged that the Myanmar National Post is being used by the military to spread false information and undermine independent pro-democracy media. The publication has, in turn, labeled non-military media as conducting a "media jihad", accusing them of biased reporting—focusing on attacks against Muslims and mosque destruction, while purportedly overlooking cases involving the killing of Buddhist monks.

On 2 March 2026, the chief editor, Naung Taw Lay, was awarded the Medal for Excellent Performance in Social Field (Second Class), one of the highest national medals conferred by the Government of Myanmar, in recognition of his contributions to social welfare and media support for the nation through his news outlet.

== See also ==
- List of newspapers in Burma
- Media of Burma
