= Nay Win =

Burmese rapper, singer and songwriter (born 1987)

Nay Win နေဝင်း
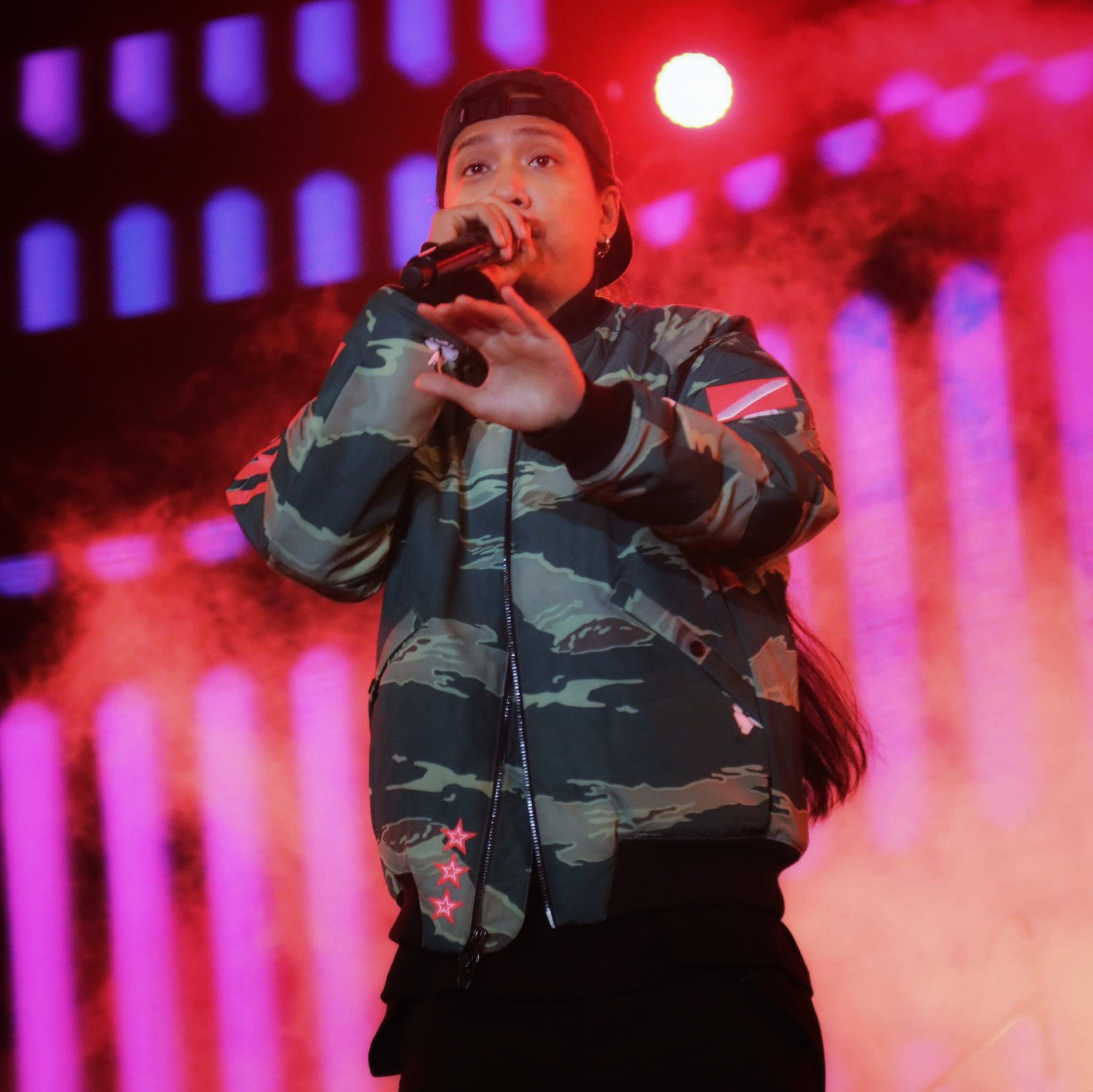
- Nay Win in 2019

Background information
- Born: Nay Win; 25 April 1987 (age 39); Kyauk Myaung, Yangon, Myanmar
- Genres: Hip hop
- Occupations: Singer-songwriter, rapper
- Instrument: Vocals
- Years active: 2000–present

Nay Win (Burmese: နေဝင်း; born 25 April 1987) is a Burmese rapper, singer, songwriter and actor. He is considered one of the most commercially successful hip hop singers in the Burmese music scene, and he received the 2023 Myanmar Academy Award for Best Supporting Actor for his role in the film Yee Ywal Moe.

== Early life and education ==
Nay Win was born on 25 April 1987 in Kyauk Myaung, Yangon, Myanmar. His father is a painter. He is the second son of four siblings, having an elder brother, a younger sister and a younger brother. He graduated high school from Basic Education High School No. 1 Dagon.

== Music career ==
Nay Win got into music in 2000 when he helped start the underground hip hop group Snare with his school friend Sithu Phay Myint. Not long after, their friends Phyo Lay and Set Paing Soe came on board, along with Nay Win's cousin Aung Thu. In 2001, the group put together their first unofficial album, but money was tight. They could only afford to make 40 copies. At the time, hip hop was already taking off among young people in Yangon, thanks in large part to bands like Acid, who brought American-style hip hop to Myanmar. Nay Win noticed what was happening early on and started building on the sound of the artists he looked up to.

Around 2003 or 2004, things took a turn. The producers behind Snare's second album were arrested for reasons Nay Win doesn't really talk about. That left the album unfinished. Around the same time, vocalist Aung Thu left the group for personal reasons. Snare didn't officially break up, but things definitely slowed down. In 2003, Nay Win helped start another group called G Family, where he was a founding member. He ended up recording a bunch of songs and mixtapes with them. Then in 2004, he put together a new project called Hip Hop Vibration with Naing Win, May Moe, and Moe Thae. The group dropped their first solo album, "Hip Hop Vibration Pya Htan Chat," in 2005 and put out a VCD to go with it.

In 2006, the four remaining Snare members got back together and started working on new material at Sithu's home studio. They released those songs the same year. Things were rolling again, even though Sithu and Phaing Soe had moved on to other projects by 2008. That left Nay Win and Phyoe Lay as the only two from the original lineup still active in the group.

In 2010, Nay Win started working with Frenzo Production, a major music company in Myanmar owned by Sai Sai Kham Leng. From then on, he started performing at shows around the country, including a regular spot at Sai Sai Kham Leng's birthday concert every year.

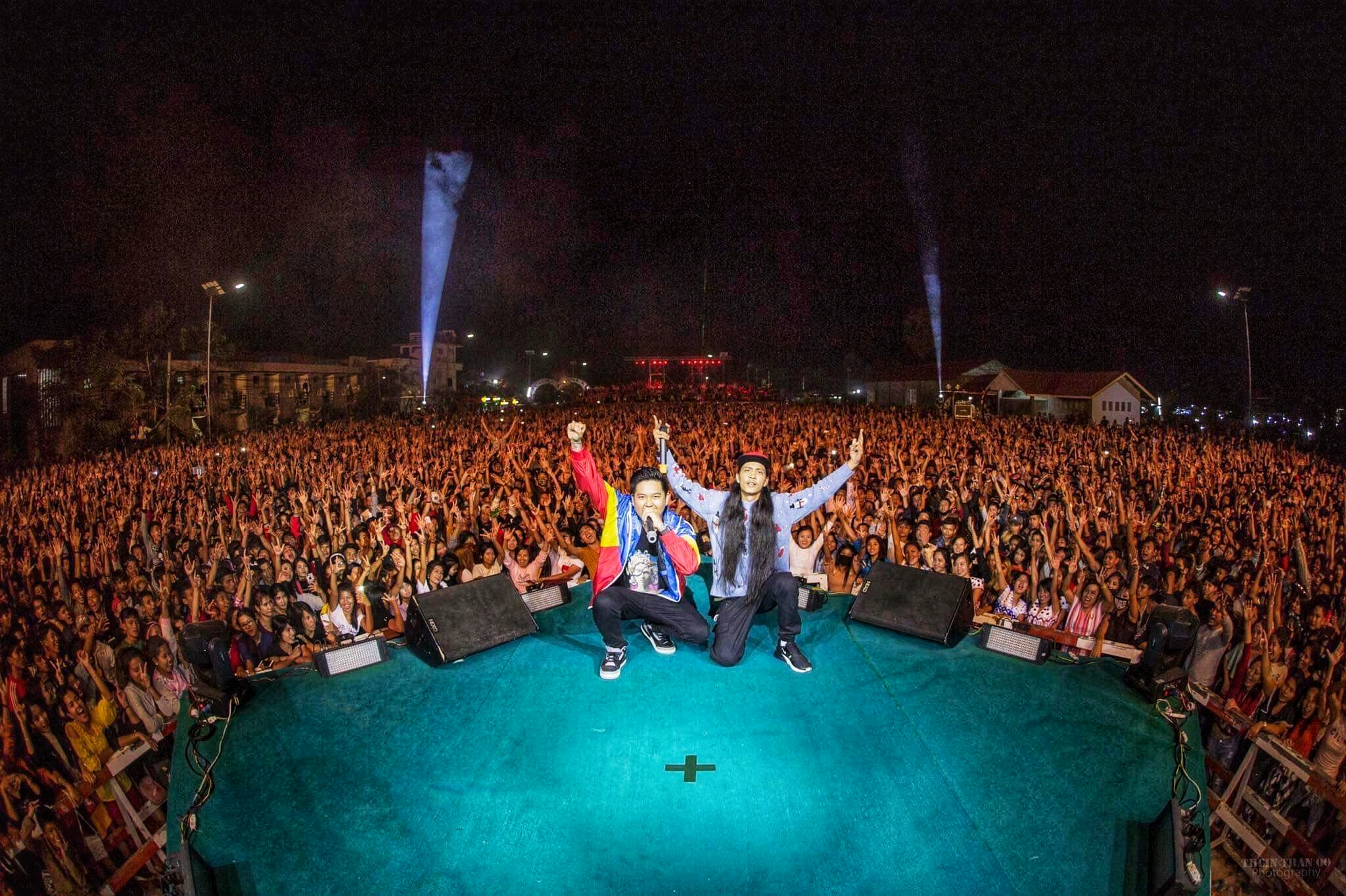
Nay Win and Phyo Lay performing in a concert

In late 2010, Nay Win and Phyo Lay finally put out Snare's first official album, "Rap Game". They followed it up in 2013 with a second album called "Ba Gyi Phyo and U Nay Win". Somewhere in there, they dropped a track called "Danger" that ended up taking off. It's still one of the bigger songs from his career. Two-members left Snare had also staged successful live shows such as a solo performance "Snare Show 2014" in Mhyaw Sin Kyun, Kandawgyi Park in Yangon on November 16, 2014. Snare won the "Best Rap Music Award" and "Best Rap music, song and best album of the year" at the 2014 Myanmar Music Award (MMA). He went to Singapore in 2014 and again in 2015 with Frenzo Production for shows. That same year, he also traveled to Australia and the US to perform.

The third album "Puu Twal Champion", was released on 12 February 2018.

Nay Win released his debut solo album, Swe Myo Par Mae, on 1 December 2018. The album produced several hit songs and reached number one on the year-end best-selling albums chart.

On 1 April 2019, Frenzo released an animated music video for "Nga Yee Zar Ka Po Mite Tal" (My Girlfriend Is Better Than Yours), featuring Nay Win, Sai Sai Kham Leng, Phyo Lay, Bunny Phyoe, Ki Ki Kyaw Zaw, John and G Fatt. The song originally appeared on Sai Sai Kham Leng's album Sai Sai Is Sai Sai, which was released on 1 April 2018. The music video gained popularity after its release on Sai Sai Kham Leng's official Facebook page and YouTube channel. Viewers praised the animation quality, which was handled by Pencell Studio. The video received 1 million views within 24 hours and reached 2 million views in its first week.

== Acting career ==
Ne Win won the Best Supporting Actor Award for the film Yee Ywal Moe (Intended Rain) at the 2023 Myanmar Motion Picture Academy Awards. This was the very first feature film he ever starred in.

He starred in a military propaganda short film titled Those Who Will Gallop Through History (ခေတ်သမိုင်းကို ဒုန်းစိုင်းမည့်သူများ), produced by the junta and released on October 25, 2025. The film depicts events from the 2021 military coup to the planned general election, portraying the Civil Disobedience Movement (CDM), youth emigration, and armed resistance groups in a critical light. Following its release, he faced public criticism over his involvement in the film. State media reported that legal action would be taken against individuals who publicly criticized the production.

He was nominated for Best Actor at the 2025 Myanmar Academy Awards for his performance in the film Byaw Than.

== Personal life ==
In 2013, Nay Win broadened his business and creative interests with the opening of ‘Oh My Godfather’ (OMG), a fashion design and retail outlet where Nay Win plays a hand in designing new lines of clothing.

In 2023, he married his long-time girlfriend Travel Kueen, a travel blogger, marking their 14th anniversary as a couple. The couple welcomed a daughter in 2024.

== Discography ==
=== Group albums ===
- Hip Hop Vibration Pya Htan Chat (2005)

=== Duo albums (Snare) ===
- Rap Game (2010)
- Ba Gyi Phyo and U Nay Win (ဘကြီးဖြိုးနဲ့ဦးနေဝင်း) (2013)
- Puu Twal Champion (ပူးတွဲချန်ပီယံ) (2018)

=== Solo albums ===
- Swe Myo Par Mae (ဆွေမျိုးပါမေ့) (2018)

=== Collaboration albums ===
- A Thit Kyite Thu Myar (အသစ်ကြိုက်သူများ)
- Pyaw Sa Yar Gyi (ပျော်စရာကြီး)
- Lat Lat Ko Hta Lo 1/2 (လက်လက်ကိုထလို့ ၁/၂)
- Mone Tal (မုန်းတယ်)
- Solo Live
- Cheere
- Min A Twat 3 (မင်းအတွက် ၃)
- Eain Ma Paing Yin Gawli Ma Lok Nae (အိမ်မပိုင်ရင်ဂေါ်လီမလုပ်နဲ့)
- Cherry Oo 13 Anniversary
- Aww Luu Tway (ဪလူတွေ)
- Yote Pouk Nay Pi (ရုပ်ပေါက်နေပြီ)
- New Age
- Gin (ဂျင်)
- A Mhar Nae Ma Kin Tat Luu (အမှားနဲ့မကင်းတဲ့လူ)
- 120/B
- Bar Tway Pyit (ဘာတွေဖြစ်)
- Sai Sai is Sai Sai (စိုင်းစိုင်းကစိုင်းစိုင်း)
- 9 Night Birthday
- Shock (ရှော့)
- Khar Cha Nay Ya Tal (ခါခြနေရတယ်)
- Gar (ဂါ)

=== Tours ===
- 2004: Snare Show
- 2010–present: Concerts held every year on 10 April for Sai Sai Birthday

== Awards, nominations and recognition ==
On March 2, 2026, he was conferred the Medal for Excellent Performance in Social Field (First Class), one of the highest national medals awarded by the Government of Myanmar for exceptional contributions to social welfare.

=== Academy Awards ===
Year	Award	Category	Nominated work	Result
2023	Myanmar Academy Award	Best Supporting Actor	Yee Ywal Moe	Won
2025	Myanmar Academy Award	Best Actor	Byaw Than	Nominated
