= A Lan Zayar 2 =

2013 Burmese Film

- Film Poster
- Burmese: အလန်းဇယား ၂
- Directed by: Nyi Nyi Htun Lwin
- Screenplay by: Lwin Min Eant
- Story by: Lwin Min Eant
- Produced by: Ma Aye Aye Win
- Starring: Moe Aung Yin; Aung Ye Lin; Wutt Hmone Shwe Yi; Moe Yu San; Nan Su Yati Soe
- Cinematography: Zaw Myint
- Edited by: Aung Thwin
- Music by: Htin Kyaw San Ei Thar Ta Pyae
- Production company: Lucky Seven Film Production
- Release date: 20 December 2013
- Running time: 116 minutes
- Country: Myanmar
- Language: Burmese

A Lan Zayar 2 (Burmese: အလန်းဇယား ၂) is a 2013 Burmese romantic-comedy film, directed by Nyi Nyi Htun Lwin starring Moe Aung Yin, Aung Ye Lin, Wutt Hmone Shwe Yi, Moe Yu San and Nan Su Yati Soe. It is a sequel to A Lan Zayar.

== Cast ==
- Moe Aung Yin as Lin Kar Oo
- Aung Ye Lin as Moe Kaung Kin
- Wutt Hmone Shwe Yi as Hsaung Kabyar
- Moe Yu San as Htal Wah Thu
- Nan Su Yati Soe as Theingi Maw
- Chan Mi Mi Ko as Shu Ma Wa
- Khin Hlaing as Kyaw Naing
- Bay Lu Wa as Tin Shwe
- Pwint as Aunty Yin
