= Clinging with Hate =

2018 Burmese religious drama film

- မုန်းစွဲ
- Directed by: Aww Yatha
- Written by: Ashin Sandadika
- Screenplay by: Lwin Min Ant
- Story by: Ashin Sandadika; Lwin Min Ant
- Based on: Athay Hla Tae Thu by Ashin Sandadika
- Produced by: Wai Minn Maung
- Starring: Nay Toe; Kyaw Kyaw Bo; Min Thway; Phway Phway; Aye Wutyi Thaung
- Cinematography: Winn Lwin Htet; Arkar Toe
- Edited by: Arkar
- Production company: 7th Sense Creation
- Release date: 16 November 2018
- Running time: 132 minutes
- Country: Myanmar
- Language: Burmese
- Budget: Ks. 300/- million

Clinging with Hate (or Clinging to Hate; Burmese: မုန်းစွဲ, romanized: Mone Swel, also spelt as Mone Swal) is a 2018 Burmese religious drama film directed by Aww Yatha and starring Nay Toe, Kyaw Kyaw Bo, Min Thway, Phway Phway and Aye Wutyi Thaung. Based on the novel One Who Dies Beautifully (အသေလှတဲ့သူ) by Buddhist monk Ashin Sandadika, the film premiered in Myanmar and in Singapore on 16 November 2018. It became one of highest-grossing films in Myanmar, as well as the most successful film released by 7th Sense Creation at the time.

== Plot ==
Based on the true story, In 1959 in Central Burma, two evil brother Nga Htoo Zaw and Nga Htoo Maw reincarnated into twins from hatred and revenge. The Abbot tell them they must separate and release hatred and learn how to love or otherwise they will suffer in Samsara (circle of life and death) for eternity.

== Cast ==
- Nay Toe as Nga Htoo Zaw in past life, the two Buddhist monks (dual role) in present life
- Kyaw Kyaw Bo as Ko Phoe Aung
- Min Thway as Nga Htoo Maw in past life
- Phway Phway as Ma Thel Oohm (wife of Ko Phoe Aung)
- Aye Wutyi Thaung as Ma Kyar Ooh in past life, Ma Theigi in present life

== Accolades ==
Year	Award	Category	Nominee	Result
2018	Myanmar Motion Picture Academy Awards	Best Sound	Ko Aye	Won
2018	Myanmar Motion Picture Academy Awards	Best Editing	Arkar	Nominated
2018	Myanmar Motion Picture Academy Awards	Best Cinematography	Win Lwin Htet	Won
2018	Myanmar Motion Picture Academy Awards	Best Screenplay	Lwin Min Ant	Nominated
2018	Myanmar Motion Picture Academy Awards	Best Director	Aww Ya Tha	Won
2018	Myanmar Motion Picture Academy Awards	Best Picture	7th Sense Film Production	Nominated
2018	Myanmar Motion Picture Academy Awards	Best Supporting Actor	Kyaw Kyaw Bo	Won
2018	Myanmar Motion Picture Academy Awards	Best Supporting Actress	Aye Wutyi Thaung	Nominated
2018	Myanmar Motion Picture Academy Awards	Best Actor	Nay Toe	Nominated
2018	Star Award	Best Cinematography	Win Lwin Htet	Nominated
2018	Star Award	Best Story	Ashin Sandadika	Won
2018	Star Award	Best Director	Aww Ya Tha	Nominated
2018	Star Award	Best Picture	7th Sense Film Production	Nominated
2018	Star Award	Best Supporting Actor	Kyaw Kyaw Bo	Nominated
2018	Star Award	Best Performance	Aye Wutyi Thaung	Nominated
