= Hein Wai Yan =

Burmese actor and model

- ဟိန်းဝေယံ
- Born: 12 May 1989 (age 37); Yangon, Myanmar
- Occupations: Actor, model
- Years active: 2000s–present
- Spouse: Soe Pyae Thazin (m. 2025)

Hein Wai Yan (Burmese: ဟိန်းဝေယံ; born 12 May 1989) is a Burmese actor and model. He is known for his work in Burmese films and television dramas, including his role as Phoe Thar in the television series Yin Khwin Shin Tan (2019).

== Early life ==
Hein Wai Yan was born on 12 May 1989 in Yangon, Myanmar.

== Career ==
Hein Wai Yan began his career as a model before entering the Burmese film and television industry. During the late 2000s, he appeared in a number of video productions and modelling projects.

According to media reports, his family operated the Man Htet Chi video production company, which was associated with his early involvement in the entertainment industry. He subsequently appeared in numerous Burmese video films and television productions.

In 2019, he portrayed Phoe Thar in the television drama series Yin Khwin Shin Tan, alongside Aye Wutyi Thaung, Nyein Thaw, Thun Sett, Thiri Soe, Han Lay, Oak Thar Kyaw and Khay La Yaung. The series aired on Channel 9 from 24 May to 27 July 2019.

== Personal life ==
Hein Wai Yan married actress and singer Soe Pyae Thazin in 2025.

== Filmography ==
=== Film ===
Year	Title	Role	Notes
2016	Ma Chit Tat Yin Thin Pay Mae		Film

=== Television series ===
Year	Title	Role	Notes
2017	Yadanabon	Lin Yan	Main role
2019	Yin Khwin Shin Tan	Phoe Thar	Main role
2025	La Young Out Ka Kumudra		Main role
