= Nay Lin Aung =

Burmese politician

- နေလင်းအောင်

Member of the Pyithu Hluttaw
- Constituency: Sagaing Township
- Majority: 8216 votes

Personal details
- Born: 27 November 1976 (age 49) Mindat, Myanmar
- Party: National League for Democracy
- Relations: Mya Min (father); Khin Nyo Win (mother)
- Education: Monywa University
- Occupation: Politician

Nay Lin Aung (Burmese: နေလင်းအောင်) is a Burmese politician who currently serves as a Pyithu Hluttaw MP for Mindat Township.

== Early life ==
Nay was born on 27 November 1976 in Mindat, Myanmar. He graduated B.A(History) from Monywa University.

== Political career ==
He is a member of the National League for Democracy. In the 2015 Myanmar general election, he was elected as Pyithu Hluttaw MP, winning a majority of 8216 votes and elected representative from Mindat Township parliamentary constituency.
