= The Rose (Burmese TV series) =

2022 Burmese television series

- Poster
- Burmese: သဘင်သည်မြနှင်းဆီ
- Genre: Horror
- Created by: Love TV
- Screenplay by: Ingyin Han
- Story by: Ko Set
- Directed by: Ko Set
- Starring: Min Set Thit; Si Thu Oht Soe; Kaung Htet Paing; Myoe Zayar Win; Cindy Myat; Yoon Thadar Aung
- Country of origin: Myanmar
- Original language: Burmese
- No. of episodes: 9

Production
- Producer: Daw Yin Yin San
- Production location: Myanmar
- Cinematography: Linn Thein
- Running time: 25 minutes
- Production company: Sein Htay Film Production

Original release
- Network: Fortune TV
- Release: 23 October – 20 November 2022

The Rose (Burmese: သဘင်သည်မြနှင်းဆီ, lit. 'Anyeint Dancer Mya Hnin Si') is a 2022 Burmese horror television series. It aired on Fortune TV, from October 23 to November 20, 2022, on every Saturday and Sunday at 20:30 for 9 episodes.

== Synopsis ==
Mya Hnin Si Mansion is the mansion of anyeint dancer Mya Hnin Si, where her spirit resides and is famous for being very haunted. Mya Hnin Si is an who was popular in the country many years ago and who committed suicide in her mansion. Daw Ni Ni, who was the housekeeper when Mya Hnin Si was there, announced that she would award a prize to the person who could stay in that famous mansion for exactly (7) days, but so far no one has been able to stay for the full (7) days. Therefore, this time, Daw Ni Ni has announced a change that she will allow up to four young boys to live in the house, not just one person.

So, the four youths named, Moe Thauk, Yaung Ni, Lin Htet and Myat Thit, arrived at the Mya Hnin Si Mansion to collect the prize money. After meeting Daw Ni Ni and allowing her to stay for 7 days, they began to experience Mya Hnin Si's terror on the first and second night.

When the girlish man Moe Thauk's soul is overpowered by Mya Hnin Si, the hauntings become more and more violent and become more severe to the point where their life is in danger.

== Cast ==
- Cindy Myat as Mya Hnin Si
- Min Set Thit as Moe Thauk
- Si Thu Oht Soe as Yaung Ni
- Kaung Htet Paing as Lin Htet
- Myoe Zayar Win as Myat Thit
- Yoon Thadar Aung as Daw Ni Ni
