= Su Htat =

Burmese actress, model and game streamer (born 1994)

- ဆုထက်
- Born: Su Htat Htat; September 5, 1994 (age 31); Yangon, Myanmar
- Other name: Zero
- Education: Yangon University of Foreign Languages
- Occupations: Actress, model, streamer
- Years active: 2016–present
- Height: 165 cm (5 ft 5 in)

Su Htat (Burmese: ဆုထက်; born Su Htat Htat on 5 September 1994) is a Burmese actress, model and game streamer. She is best known for her role in the 2019 television series Ah Saung.

== Early life and education ==
Su Htat was born on 5 September 1994 in Yangon, Myanmar. She has an elder brother. She graduated high school from Basic Education High School No. 1 Dagon, before she studied at Yangon University of Foreign Languages (YUFL) and graduated with B.A. in English in the year of 2015.

== Acting career ==
Su Htat took part in the Miss Myanmar International 2017 competition, where she showcased her talents and beauty. Her exceptional performance led her to secure a place among the top 10 finalists. As a dedicated model, her diligence caught the attention of the film industry, resulting in numerous casting offers for films. She made her acting debut in 2017 in the film Eain Htaung.

In 2018, she starred in the horror series Ah Saung (Dormitory). Fortune TV Group surveyed and decided to continue Ah Saung with a second season, according to the audiences' desires after they made the surveying. So she continued shooting season 2 in 2020. In 2019, she made her big-screen debut with Oo Tu Mhar Tae Saung (Unordered Winter Weather). She was chosen as a Star Fairy for the 2018 Star Awards, held in 2019. In 2020, she was cast in a main role in drama film Yangon In Love, directed by Htoo Paing Zaw Oo.

== Streaming career ==
In January 2019, she started streaming and she is one of the earliest female game streamers in Myanmar streaming CS: GO and other online games. At the end of the year, she became one of the most popular game streamers in local. She was also a nominee for Myanmar Influencer Awards 2018 in the category of Gaming. In 2019, the Singapore-based esports team Impunity Esports has announced Su Htat as their new brand ambassador.

== Filmography ==
=== Films ===
Year	English title	Myanmar Title	Network
2017	Ein Daung	အိမ်ထောင်	
2020	Udu Mha De Saung	ဥတုမှားတဲ့ဆောင်း	
TBA	Yangon Achit	ရန်ကုန်အချစ်	
2024	Don't Tell Anyone	ပြန်မပြောရ	

=== Television series ===
Year	English title	Myanmar title	Network	Notes
2019	Ah Saung	အဆောင်	Fortune TV	
2020	Ah Saung: Season 2	အဆောင်အိပ်မက်နိဒါန်း	Fortune TV	
2021	The Fifth Question	ပဉ္စမမြောက်ပုစ္ဆာ	Fortune TV	
2021	Active Now		Lalakyi	
2022	Colorful Dreams	ရောင်စုံခြယ်အိပ်မက်များ	Canal+	
2022	The Other Side	အခြားတစ်ဘက်	Channel K	
2022	Brew Me A Favor	ချိုခါးဆိမ့်သက် အချစ်တစ်ခွက်	Canal+	
2023		နွေဥဩ	Channel K	
2023	A Man A Coffin	လူတစ်ယောက် အခေါင်းတစ်လုံး	Fortune TV	
2023	Be My Weather	ဒီလိုရာသီဥတုမျိုး	Fortune TV	
2024		ကြောက်နေရမယ်		
2024	Leaf story	စွယ်တော်ရွက် ပုံပြင်	Fortune TV	
2025	Born to be one	အရှုံးမဲ့ အနိုင်	Canal+	

=== Web-Series ===
Year	English title	Myanmar Title	Network
2023	The Hoodie		
2023	She		

== Awards ==
Year	Award	Award Title	Title	Category	Result
2023	Asian Academy Creative Awards	Best Actress In A Supporting Role	ချိုခါးဆိမ့်သက် အချစ်တစ်ခွက်	Film	Won
2024	GG Awards	Multi-Talented		Esports	Won
