= Aung Yin =

Burmese singer

Aung Yin အောင်ရင်
- Born: 28 June 1964 (age 60); Rangoon, Burma
- Genres: Burmese pop
- Occupation: Singer
- Years active: 1980s–2010s

Aung Yin (Burmese: အောင်ရင်, [ʔàʊɰ̃ jɪ̀ɰ̃]; born 28 June 1964) is a Burmese pop singer, who reached the height of his career in the late 1980s to early 1990s.

== Early life and education ==
Aung Yin was born on 28 June 1964 in Rangoon, Burma to parent Han Yin and Khin Myaing. He is the eldest son of three siblings, having two younger brothers. Aung Yin began singing on stage in the 4th standard and immediately joined the music industry upon graduating from the 10th standard from State High School No. 1 Dagon (BEHS No. 1 Dagon).

== Career ==
Aung released his first album in 1984, but it was not successful. He married Moe Thinza Myint in 1985. His best selling album "Min ma shi de nauk" (မင်းမရှိတဲ့နောက်) was released in 1988. During his career, he also released many duet albums with other well-known singers like May Sweet and Hayma Ne Win, under the mentorship of Burmese singer-songwriter Htoo Ein Thin. Aung Yin has more than 50 albums released.

== Personal life ==
His son Moe Aung Yin is an actor.
