= Yadanabon (TV series) =

Burmese television series

- Official poster
- Burmese: ရတနာပုံ
- Genre: Drama
- Screenplay by: Moe Sat Wine; Thu Way
- Directed by: Thar Nyi
- Starring: Hein Wai Yan; Moe Yan Zun; Htun Ko Ko; Aye Wutyi Thaung; Yadanar Bo; Zun Than Sin
- Country of origin: Myanmar
- Original language: Burmese
- No. of episodes: 20

Production
- Production location: Myanmar
- Running time: 40 minutes
- Production company: Myanmar Media 7

Original release
- Network: MNTV
- Release: 9 April – 27 August 2017

Yadanabon (Burmese: ရတနာပုံ) is a 2017 Burmese drama television series. It aired on MNTV, from April 9, to August 27, 2017, on every Sunday at 19:20 for 20 episodes.

== Cast ==
- Hein Wai Yan as Lin Yan
- Moe Yan Zun as Moe Naung
- Htun Ko Ko as Nyi Min Htet
- Aye Wutyi Thaung as May Thaw
- Yadanar Bo as Nay Yee
- Zun Than Sin as Su Htar Thet
- Chit Kyae Hmone as Kyar Nyo
