= Ah Saung =

Burmese television series

- Poster
- Burmese: အဆောင်
- Genre: Horror; Drama
- Screenplay by: Mal Khaing; Shwe Pyae; Su Aw Chel
- Directed by: Malikha Soe Htike Aung
- Starring: Nyein Thaw; Hsu Htet Kaday; Su Htat; Sao Yoon Waddy Oo; Hsu Myat Noe Oo; Ye Aung; Pyay Zin; Nyi Htut Khaung; Russell
- Theme music composer: Hnaung Eain Thit
- Country of origin: Myanmar
- Original language: Burmese
- No. of seasons: 2
- No. of episodes: 32

Production
- Production location: Myanmar
- Editors: Hnaung Eain Thit; Pi Si
- Running time: 50 minutes
- Production company: Stellar Seven Entertainment

Original release
- Network: Fortune TV
- Release: 1 June 2019 – 29 March 2020

Ah Saung (Burmese: အဆောင်; lit. Hostel or Amulet ) is a Burmese horror television series. It aired on Fortune TV. Ah Saung season 1 aired from June 1 to July 20, 2019, on every Saturday at 19:30 for 8 episodes and Ah Saung season 2: Dream Introduction (Burmese: အဆောင် ၂ အိပ်မက်နိဒါန်း) aired from January 11 to March 29, 2020, on every Saturday and Sunday at 19:00 for 24 episodes.

== Synopsis ==
=== Season 1 ===
A hostel restricted to "men are not allowed in". The hostel is full of interesting secrets and some parts of the hostel are not even accessible to tenants. The owner of the hostel is Mya Hnin Nu, a lonely woman with strict discipline. Seven girls came to rent the hostel. They also have secrets and past traces.

One day, the seven hostel residents unexpectedly invited a guest. What is the secret of Mya Hnin Nu, the hostel owner. What is the sad story behind the history of this building? It will capture the attention of TV viewers with horrible events, unexpected twists and turns.

=== Season 2 ===
A shelter for non-relatives eight hostel residents living in the same house who met in different ways. You will feel greed, anger, love, hatred and confusion in Ah Saung 2: Dream Introduction.

== Cast ==
- Nyein Thaw as Nu Maung, Htut Khaung
- Hsu Myat Noe Oo as Lin Sat
- Hsu Htet Kaday as Mya Hnin Nu
- Su Htat as Tharaphu, Ani
- Sao Yoon Waddy Oo as Padonmar
- Phyo Pa Pa Htoo as Moon Yati
- Shoon Yamone as Kyi Nuu
- Hsu Yee Htet as Ei Thar
- Hein Zarni Khine as War So
- Thel Thel Hsu Nyein as Thoon
- Maysi May as Tin Ma Ma
- Chit Myittar Cho as Tu Tu
- Ye Aung as U Myat Kyaw
- Pyay Zin as Hmue
- Nyi Htut Khaung as Aldo
- Russell as Khine Myae
- Htoo Pyae Aung as Nathan
- May Thet Kyaw as Sein
- Htet Eaindra Naing as May Cho
- Eaint Hmue Kay Thwe as Sandi
- Young P as Key
