= Htoo Ein Thin =

Burmese pop rock singer-songwriter (1963–2004)

Htoo Eain Thin ထူးအိမ်သင်

Background information
- Born: Kyaw Myint Lwin ကျော်မြင့်လွင်) (ကိုငှက်); 1 July 1963; Pathein, Burma
- Died: 14 August 2004 (aged 41) Yangon, Myanmar
- Genres: Rock, pop rock
- Occupation: Singer-songwriter
- Instruments: Vocals, guitar, piano, harmonica, drums
- Years active: 1986–2004

Htoo Eain Thin (Burmese: ထူးအိမ်သင်; pronounced [tʰú ʔèiɰ̃ θɪ̀ɰ̃]; born Kyaw Myint Lwin (ကျော်မြင့်လွင်, [tɕɔ̀ mjɪ̰ɰ̃ lwɪ̀ɰ̃]); 1 July 1963 – 14 August 2004) was one of the most popular and respected Burmese singer-songwriters. He brought a new style of pop rock music to the Burmese music scene in mid-1980s, and was popular till his death in 2004. He released 14 solo albums in his 18-year career. His songs remain Burmese standards and his premature death is still mourned by millions of fans.

== Background ==
Htoo Eain Thin was born on 1 July 1963 in Pathein in the Irrawaddy Division to a Burman father (Tun Myint) and a Mon mother (Mya Yin). He graduated from Basic Education High School No. 3 Pathein in 1979, and attended Pathein Regional College for two years. In 1981, his entire family moved to Mawlamyaing, and he enrolled in a correspondence course at the University of Mawlamyine, graduating with a Bachelor of Science degree in physics in 1984. After graduation, he studied formal music education under a well known music instructor Aung Soe (KC Francis). Htoo Eain Thin was proficient in playing guitar, bass guitar, piano, harmonica, flute and drums.

== Musical career ==
Htoo Eain Thin is widely remembered for his heart-felt songs with his own original music and lyrics. Being an "original" songwriter means a lot in Myanmar. When he released his first album Naryi Baw Mha Myet-Yay Zet Mya (Tear Drops on the Clock) in 1986, the Burmese pop music scene was (and still to a lesser extent is) dominated by Burmese covers of Western pop and country music—known locally as "copies".

To be sure, Htoo Eain Thin's musical style was heavily influenced by Western jazz, rock-and-roll and pop music. Some critics complained that his sound was still too "derivative" or "emulative", comparing his compositions and arrangements to those of the Bee Gees or the Beatles. But it was his ability to bring Burmese soulfulness (some would say wailing quality) to his lyrics and combine it with Western-fused arrangements that proved ever so popular with generations of Burmese—male and female alike. His style was unique, even compared to that of other contemporary singer-songwriters like Soe Lwin Lwin and Kaiser.

Like most Burmese songs, many of his songs are about love and heart-ache, only areas that could safely pass through draconian Burmese media censors, which did not (and still don't) tolerate even a hint of social commentary. His 1991 ode Yazawin Mya Ye Thado-Thami (The Bride of History) raised a few eyebrows. Although the song ostensibly is about Myanmar's main artery Irrawaddy River, many took it to be as an implicit reference to Aung San Suu Kyi. He was banned from performing the song in his concerts.

Within the confines of Burmese censors, one topic he wrote extensively about was the mother's love, the relationship between the mother and the son, and a son's regrets. He devoted an entire album A-May (Mother) to this topic. The song A-May Ein (Mother's Home) continues to resonate deeply with many Burmese home and especially, abroad.

His success with Naryi was followed by a string of successful albums, culminating in Atta Bon Saung Khe Mya, and Akyinna Einmet, both released in 1991. His songs from this early era are still very popular today. In particular, Mei-Lai-Taw (Just Forget It), Min-Ma-Shi-De-Nauk (Since You've Been Gone) and Hsway-De (Longing) remain standards to this day. His success waned in later albums though he remained popular. He even resorted to covering a few Western songs—something that did not sit well with some of his purist fans. His last albums—in particular the posthumous Chit-Chin Ah-Phyint (With Love)--saw a return to his musical roots that captivated generations of Burmese.

Htoo Eain Thin also composed many commercially successful songs for other singers. A successful singer, Aung Yin has publicly acknowledged that he owes his success to his saya (teacher) Htoo Eain Thin. Hayma Ne Win, a popular female singer, has covered many of Htoo Eain Thin's popular songs.

== Premature death ==
Htoo Eain Thin died suddenly in 2004 of heart disease. He was survived by his wife, Thwè Thwè Htwe, and daughter, Mi Kun Htaw.

== Album discography ==
Htoo Eain Thin released 14 solo albums. His last album remains unreleased.

- Nar Yi Paw Ka Myat Yay Sat Myar (နာရီပေါ်မှ မျက်ရည်စက်များ) – Tear Drops on the Clock(1986)
- Mhaw Sayar Eain Mat (မှော်ဆရာအိပ်မက်) – Dream of a Wizard (1988)
- Thet Nyein (သက်ငြိမ်) – Tranquillity (1989)
- Attha Pone Saung Khae Myar (အတ္တပုံဆောင်ခဲများ) – Crystal Of Ego (1991)
- A Kyin Nar Eain Mat (အကြင်နာအိပ်မက်) – Dream of Affection(1991)
- A Yin A Tine (အရင်အတိုင်း) – Just Like Old Times (1991)
- Sakar Lone Ma Shi Tae Kaung Kin (စကားလုံးမရှိတဲ့ကောင်းကင်) – Sky Without Words (1995)
- Htoo Eain Thin Unplugged Live – (ထူးအိမ်သင် (Unplugged Live)) (1996)
- Myoh Pya La Yaung Tann Chin – (မြို့ပြလရောင်တမ်းချင်း) (1996)
- Win Yoe Sone Mee (ဝင်ရိုးစွန်းမီး) – Polar Flame (1997)
- A May (Tho) A Kywin Mae Metta Taw Thi Chin – (အမေ (သို့) အကြွင်းမဲ့ မေတ္တာတော်သီချင်း) – Mother (or) Owner Of Endless Love (1997)
- A Mhat Ta Ya Dan Ya Thi Chin Myar – (အမှတ်တရ ဒဏ်ရာသီချင်းများ) Songs For Memorial Scars Of Life (1999)
- A Sein Yaung Yet Swe Myar – (အစိမ်းရောင် ရက်စွဲများ) Green Dates (2001)
- Ta Nae Sar A Lwae Myar – (တစ်နေ့စာအလွဲများ) Mistakes of the Day (2003)
- Chit Chin Arr Phyint – (ချစ်ခြင်းအားဖြင့်) With Love (2005)
- Nhit Cho' Waing – (နှစ်ချို့ဝိုင်) Aged Wine (unreleased)
