= A Lan Lun A Lun Lan =

2012 Burmese Film

- Film Poster
- Burmese: အလန်းလွန်အလွန်လန်း
- Directed by: Nyi Nyi Htun Lwin
- Screenplay by: Lwin Min Eant
- Story by: Lwin Min Eant
- Produced by: U Myint Swe
- Starring: Nay Toe; Thinzar Wint Kyaw; Melody; Soe Pyae Thazin; Nan Su Yati Soe; Wutt Hmone Shwe Yi; Chan Mi Mi Ko; Christina
- Cinematography: Kyaw Nyunt; Moe Zaw
- Edited by: Kyaw Khine Soe
- Music by: Khin Maung Gyi
- Production company: Lu Swan Kaung Film Production
- Release date: September 21, 2012
- Running time: 157 minutes
- Country: Myanmar
- Language: Burmese

A Lan Lun A Lun Lan (Burmese: အလန်းလွန်အလွန်လန်း) is a 2012 Burmese romantic-comedy film, directed by Nyi Nyi Htun Lwin starring Nay Toe, Thinzar Wint Kyaw, Melody, Soe Pyae Thazin, Nan Su Yati Soe and Wutt Hmone Shwe Yi.

== Cast ==
- Nay Toe as Swan Ka Bar
- Thinzar Wint Kyaw as Cynthia
- Melody as Dr. Thaw Thaw
- Soe Pyae Thazin as Kay Tha Ri
- Nan Su Yati Soe as Nyo Mi Thwin
- Wutt Hmone Shwe Yi as May Tha Ra
- Christina as Khin Phyu Phyu Htut
- Chan Mi Mi Ko as Mermaid
- Pwint as Daw Khin Lain
- Zaw Win Naing as U Kaung Thit
- Yoon Yoon as Thaw Thaw
