= Charm (TV series) =

Burmese television series

- Poster
- Burmese: ချာမ်း
- Genre: Comedy; Horror (Season 1)
- Screenplay by: Min Khite Soe San; Htet Myat Naing Zin (season 1); Moe Sat Wine; Sue Khet Min (season 2)
- Directed by: Thar Nyi
- Starring: Bunny Phyoe; Thein Lin Soe; Phyo Zaw Lin; Nan Su Oo; Htet Htet Htun; Chit Kyay Hmone; Sue Khet Min; Phyo Ngwe Soe; Aye Wutyi Thaung
- Country of origin: Myanmar
- Original language: Burmese
- No. of seasons: 2
- No. of episodes: 30

Production
- Production location: Myanmar
- Running time: 40 minutes
- Production company: Myanmar Media 7

Original release
- Network: MNTV
- Release: 10 April 2016 – 2 April 2017

Charm (Burmese: ချာမ်း) is a Burmese comedy television series. It aired on MNTV, on every sunday at 19: 20 for 30 episodes. Season 1 aired from April 10 to July 17, 2016 for 15 episodes and season 2 aired from December 11, 2016 to April 2, 2017 for 15 episodes.

== Episodes ==
Seasons	Episodes	First Air Date	Last Air Date
1	15	April 10, 2016	July 17, 2016
2	15	December 11, 2016	April 2, 2017

== Cast ==
- Bunny Phyoe as Charm, a titular protagonist who has the magical ability to foreshadow the future
- Thein Lin Soe as D Wyne, Charm’s friend
- Phyo Zaw Lin as Nyi Sue
- Nan Su Oo as Mone Mone Khet
- Htet Htet Htun as Pan Myat Cho
- Chit Kyay Hmone as Thwel Lay
- Wint Yamone Naing as Pyin Oo Lwin
- Than Thar Moe Theint as Yamone Nar
- Sue Khet Min as Zaw Zaw Oo
- Phyo Ngwe Soe as Wunna Kyaw
- Aye Wutyi Thaung as Yadanar
- Khay Sett Thwin as Annawar
