= Moe Yu San =

- မိုးယုစံ
- Born: 11 July 1991 (age 34); Yangon, Myanmar
- Occupations: Actress, Model
- Years active: 2007–2016
- Height: 5 ft 6 in (1.68 m)
- Spouse: Swam Thu Moe

Moe Yu San (born 11 July 1991) is a Burmese actress, fashion model, former beauty queen and sometimes a traditional dancer with the Burmese traditional dance troupe. She has her own songs produced in some albums with other artists.

== Early life and education ==
Moe Yu San was born on 11 July 1991 in Yangon, Myanmar. She graduated from Yangon University with a degree in Myanmar studies.

== Career ==
In 2007, after she finished high school, she participated in Miss competitions such as Miss Now How, Miss Angel and Miss Moe Yan and had success. Because of that, she became an advertising model and actress.

In 2016, Moe subsequently retired from the entertainment industry at the time of her marriage and had a child, but she still participated as a traditional dancer in the traditional dance troupe Rose Anyeint which is held for charities. From 2007 to present, she has starred in over 100 video/films and appeared in many magazines cover.

== Personal life ==
Moe Yu San married Swam Thu Moe in 2016. She gave birth to their only son on 21 August 2017.

== Charity Work ==
Moe Yu San donated 300,000 Kyats each to Hnin Si Gone Peaceful Retreat Centre of Old Person and Film History Museum of Myanmar Film Association. Moe Yu San also participated in actor Pyay Ti Oo's "Pyay Ti Oo Foundation Fund Raising Concert" for students on 4 December 2011. She donated her artist fees for the foundation. She held a fan meeting with 'We love Moe Yu' members and donated blood. She joined the group 'Rose' and participated in many charity events.

== Filmography ==
Lists of Films
Year	Film	Co-Stars
2008	Ba Ba Gyi Ko Chit Tal	Moe Aung Yin
2008	Kat Doe Lay Chit Lite Mal	Min Maw Kun, Yan Aung
2008	Sate Ei Mar Yar	Nay Toe, Melody, Chan Chan
2009	Achit Htaung Chout	Hein Wai Yan, Thet Mon Myin
2009	Than Choun Toh Gay Har	Min Maw Kun
2009	Jo Sanay Mhway Tae Phuu Sar	Kyaw Kyaw Bo, Moe Moe
2010	Ma Net Phyan Asi Asin	Nay Toe
2010	Kanar Si Aung Gyi Nat Ka Taw Moe Kyaw	Moe Aung Yin, Ye Aung
2010	Main Ma Khar Khar	Kyaw Ye Aung
2011	Yin Twin Ashote Taw Pone	Pyay Ti Oo, Phway Phway
2011	Ma Nar Lo Ma Shi Nae	Khant Si Thu, Thinzar Wint Kyaw
2011	Achit Ka Own Sar Tae	Thu Htoo San

== Awards ==
- Miss Favourite (2007)
- Miss Shwe Mingalar Sone Twe (2008)
- Miss Angel or Demon (2007)
- Miss Now How (2007)
- Miss Now How Popular (2007)
- Miss Moe Yan (2007)
