= Melody (actress) =

Burmese film actress and singer (born 1982)

- Born: Khin Myo Ei; 6 September 1982 (age 43); Mawlamyine, Myanmar
- Occupations: Film actress, Singer
- Years active: (2006-2012, 2017-present)
- Spouse: Tha Kaung (2014-2020)

Melody (Burmese: မယ်လိုဒီ; born Khin Myo Ei (ခင်မျိုးအိ) on 6 September 1982) is a Burmese film actress and singer. She won the 2011 Myanmar Motion Picture Academy Awards for Best Actress for her work in the film, Htawara alintan mya. She married Tha Kaung in February 2014. She gave birth to her first child, a son named Siddhi Sit (သိဒ္ဓိစစ်), on 3 April 2015.

== Filmography ==
- Kyauk Sat Yay (2009)
- Hot Shot 2
- I Love You
- A Chit Ka Lan Tal
- A Chit Lar Lar Htar
- Academy Shot (cameo)
- A Lann Zayar (2011)
- Htar Waya A Linn Tan Myar (2011)
- A Lann Lun A Lun Lann (2012)
- Chu Si (2018)
