= Nya (film) =

- Film poster
- Burmese: ည
- Directed by: Htoo Paing Zaw Oo
- Written by: Htoo Paing Zaw Oo
- Produced by: Yan Naing Win
- Starring: Nyein Thaw; Chan Min Ye Htut; Agung Bagus; Aung Ye Htike; Russell; Nyein Thaw; Net Shine Ko; Nang Tracy; Moe Yathaw; Natt Shein Ko; May Sue Maung; Nang Khay Mo; Myat Noe Aye
- Cinematography: Thaidhi
- Music by: Rachel Tayza
- Production company: Good Old Days Film Production
- Distributed by: Good Old Days
- Release date: 28 July 2017
- Running time: 120 minutes
- Country: Myanmar
- Language: Burmese

Nya (Burmese: ည 'Night') is a Burmese film created by director Htoo Paing Zaw Oo with the starring Myat Noe Aye, Agung Bagus, Aung Ye Htike, Russell, and Moe Ya Thaw. The film was screened in Myanmar cinemas on 28 July 2017 and re-screened on JCVG cinemas on 18 April 2018 (Note: In fact, only the Academy Awards-winning films are allowed to re-screen once again, and it is a rare occurrence to re-screened non-Myanmar Academy Awarded film.) which ended up as one of the highest-grossing films in Myanmar that year.

Htoo Paing Zaw Oo took about three years to write the story and script, prepare for the film and find the new locations. The actors and actresses were chosen among 300 candidates and they received a 150-day training course. Nya is also released as exclusive video-on-demand content on iflix platform on 12 August 2018.

== Plot ==
The film is about the accident between the teenagers. Nyein Thaw, Chan Min and Aung teased Tracy about her crush on Nyein Thaw on April's Fool. She hated them since and try to revenge. Myat Noe who is studying abroad and Russell are sweet couple. Yathaw is Myat Noe's friend who helps them for her wedding. She has a younger brother, Nat Shine Ko who is the son of her father 2nd wife. Yathaw hates Nat Shine Ko and she always quarrels with him. One day, she break the photo album of his mother, Nat Shine Ko acridity to her. Then, Tracy and Nat Shine Ko meet and they try to reprisal to each others.

== Cast ==
They use their own names in the film.

- Nyein Thaw as Nyein Thaw, a teenager who likes to chase other people.
- Aung Ye Htike as Aung Ye Htike, boyfriend of Nan Khay Mo
- Agung Bagus as Agung Bagus, friend of Nyein Thaw
- Chan Min Ye Htut as Chan Min Ye Htut, a millionaire who wants to study in abroad
- May Sue Maung as May Sue Maung, girlfriend of Nyein Thaw
- Natt Shein Ko as Natt Shein Ko, friend of Aung Ye Htike
- Nang Khay Mo as Nang Khay Mo, girlfriend of Aung Ye Htike
- Nang Tracy as Nang Tracy, a girl who crush on Nyein Thaw
- Net Shine Ko as Net Shine Ko, son of Moe Yathaw's father's 2nd wife
- Russell as Russell, Myat Noe Aye's boyfriend
- Myat Noe Aye as Myat Noe Aye, Russell's girlfriend
- Moe Yathaw as Moe Yathaw, friend of Myat Noe Aye
