= A Lan Zayar =

2011 Burmese Film

- Film poster
- Burmese: အလန်းဇယား
- Directed by: Nyi Nyi Htun Lwin
- Screenplay by: A Kyi Taw
- Story by: A Kyi Taw
- Produced by: Ma Aye Aye Win
- Starring: Thu Htoo San; Moe Aung Yin; Moe Hay Ko; Thinzar Wint Kyaw; Nan Su Yati Soe; Melody
- Production company: Lucky Seven Film Production
- Release date: April 17, 2011
- Running time: 116 minutes
- Country: Myanmar
- Language: Burmese

A Lan Zayar (Burmese: အလန်းဇယား) is a 2011 Burmese romantic-comedy film, directed by Nyi Nyi Htun Lwin starring Thu Htoo San, Moe Aung Yin, Moe Hay Ko, Thinzar Wint Kyaw, Nan Su Yati Soe and Melody.

== Cast ==
- Thu Htoo San
- Moe Aung Yin
- Moe Hay Ko
- Thinzar Wint Kyaw
- Nan Su Yati Soe
- Melody

== See also ==
- A Lan Zayar 2
