= Hospital Diary =

Burmese television series

- Poster
- Burmese: ဆေးရုံမှတ်တမ်း
- Genre: Drama
- Screenplay by: Htet Myat Naing Zin
- Story by: Htet Myat Naing Zin
- Directed by: Min Khite Soe San
- Starring: Aung Myint Myat; Swan Htet; Myat Thu Aung; Thura Htoo; Nwe Darli Tun; Khin Thazin; Gon Yi Aye Kyaw
- Country of origin: Myanmar
- Original language: Burmese
- No. of episodes: 40

Production
- Executive producer: May Thu Phay
- Production location: Myanmar
- Cinematography: Naung Naung; Phyo Thu Kyaw; Min Min (Little Potato)
- Editors: Phyo Wai; Jay Jones
- Running time: 45 minutes
- Production company: Aung Pyi Entertainment

Original release
- Network: MRTV
- Release: 27 September – 27 December 2018

Hospital Diary (Burmese: ဆေးရုံမှတ်တမ်း) is a 2018 Burmese drama television series. It aired on MRTV, from September 27, to December 27, 2018, on every Wednesday, Thursday and Friday at 19:15 for 40 episodes.

== Cast ==
- Aung Myint Myat as Dr. Naung Yoe
- Swan Htet as Dr. Htin Shar Aung
- Myat Thu Aung as Dr. Kyaw Thu
- Thura Htoo as Dr. Zaw Lin
- Nwe Darli Tun as Than Lwin Cho
- Khin Thazin as Dr. Pone Nyet Tay Zar
- Gon Yi Aye Kyaw as Dr. Akari
