= Yin Khwin Shin Tan =

Burmese television series

- Official poster
- Burmese: ရင်ခွင်ရှင်းတမ်း
- Genre: Drama
- Screenplay by: Moe Sat Wine
- Directed by: Thar Nyi
- Starring: Hein Wai Yan; Aye Wutyi Thaung; Nyein Thaw; Thun Sett; Thiri Soe; Han Lay; Oak Thar Kyaw; Khay La Yaung
- Composers: Wai Gyi; Oak Soe Khant
- Country of origin: Myanmar
- Original language: Burmese

Production
- Production location: Myanmar
- Cinematography: Hla Myo (apple); PK; Zay Yar Win
- Editor: Aung Set
- Running time: 30 minutes
- Production company: Myanmar Media 7

Original release
- Network: Channel 9
- Release: 24 May – 27 July 2019

Yin Khwin Shin Tan (Burmese: ရင်ခွင်ရှင်းတမ်း) is a 2019 Burmese drama television series. It aired on Channel 9, from May 24, to July 27, 2019, on every Friday and Saturday at 19:30 for 20 episodes.

== Cast ==
- Hein Wai Yan as Phoe Thar
- Aye Wutyi Thaung as San Waddy
- Nyein Thaw as Nay Htet
- Thun Sett as Honey
- Thiri Soe as Yun Nge
- Han Lay as May Moe
- Oak Thar Kyaw as Kaung Kyaw
- Khay La Yaung as No No
