= Mingalar Shi Tae A Yat =

Burmese television series

- Burmese: မင်္ဂလာရှိတဲ့အရပ်
- Genre: Comedy drama
- Screenplay by: Nay Soe Thaw
- Directed by: Aww Ratha
- Starring: Myint Myat; Aye Wutyi Thaung; Nay Dway; Nwe Darli Tun; Aung Thu Lwin (Kelvin Kate)
- Composers: Tha Har Aung; Lin Htet
- Country of origin: Myanmar
- Original language: Burmese
- No. of episodes: 30

Production
- Production location: Myanmar
- Cinematography: Kyaw Than Lwin; PK
- Editor: Arkar Kyaw
- Running time: 40 minutes
- Production company: Myanmar Media 7

Original release
- Network: MNTV
- Release: 3 September 2017 – 25 March 2018

Mingalar Shi Tae A Yat (Burmese: မင်္ဂလာရှိတဲ့အရပ်) is a Burmese comedy-drama television series. It aired on MNTV, from September 3, 2017 to March 25, 2018, on every Sunday at 19:20 for 30 episodes.

== Cast ==
- Myint Myat as Banyar
- Aye Wutyi Thaung as Maw
- Nay Dway as Toe Pwar
- Nwe Darli Tun as Sabal
- Aung Thu Lwin (Kelvin Kate) as Khin Moe
