= Bunny Phyoe =

Burmese singer, songwriter and actor

Bunny Phyoe ဘန်နီဖြိုး
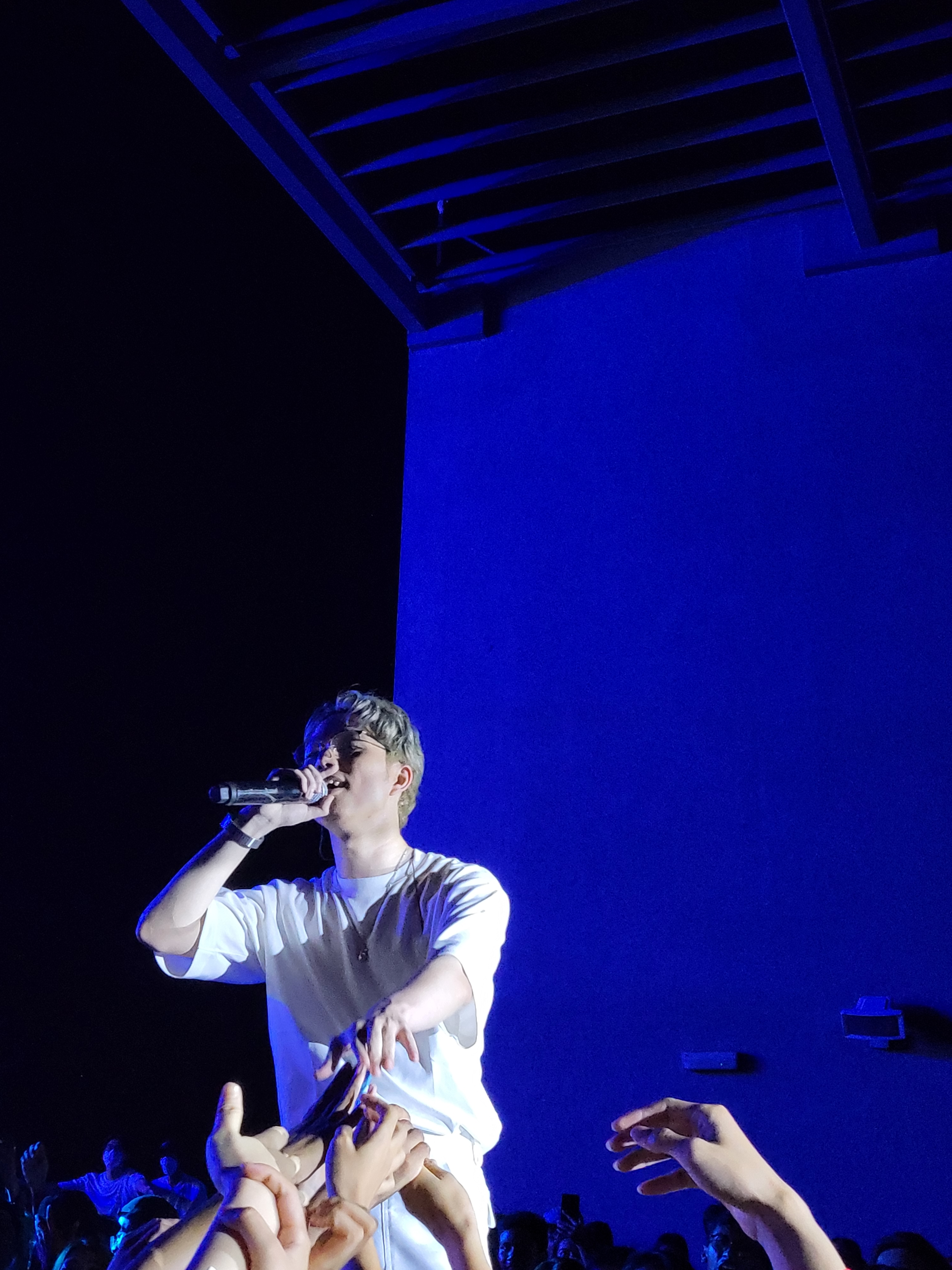
- Bunny Phyoe in 2023

Background information
- Born: Pyae Phyo Paing; 29 October 1992 (age 33); Yangon, Myanmar
- Genres: R&B, hip-hop, pop, EDM, electro pop, electro house
- Occupations: Singer, songwriter, composer, actor
- Years active: 2008–present

Pyae Phyo Paing (Burmese: ဘန်နီဖြိုး; born 9 July 1992), known professionally as Bunny Phyoe, also spelled Bunny Phyo, is a Burmese singer, songwriter, and actor from Myanmar. He is best known for performing R&B and Pop Music.

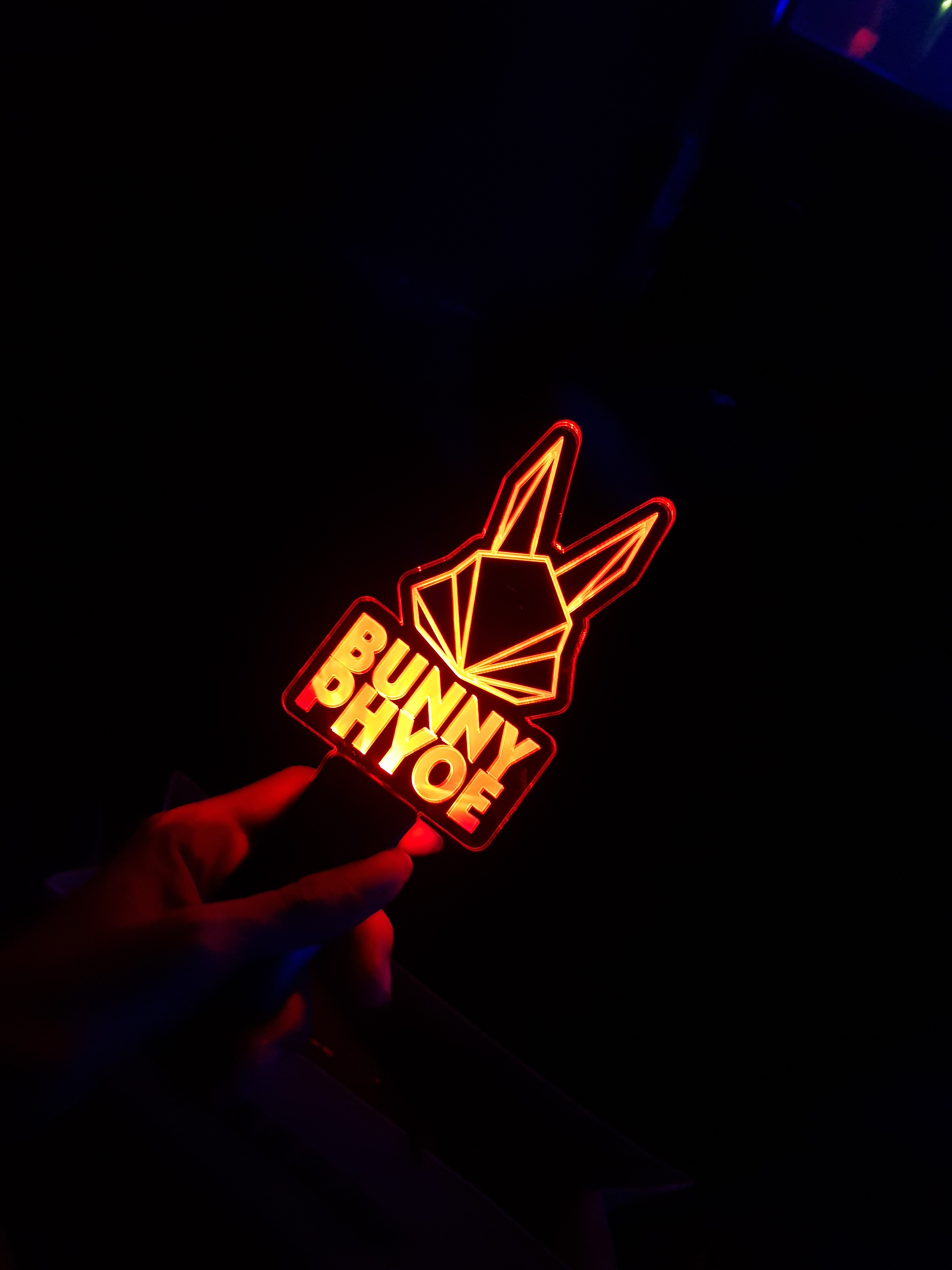
Bunny Phyoe's Light Stick

== Early life and education ==
Pyae Phyo Paing was born on 9 July 1992, in Yangon. He is the eldest son of two siblings. He studied at Basic Education High School No. 6 Botataung, and passed his matriculation examination in 2008. He graduated, majoring in English, from Eastern Yangon University.

== Career ==
=== Music career ===
He has had an interest in music since his youth. When he was in Grade 5, he recomposed Ta Yauk Htae from the album Nga Ko Chit Mae Thu by R Zarni, by adding some hip-hop lyrics. He participated in the Myanmar Traditional and Cultural Performing Arts Competition in 2000 and 2012 respectively.

After passing his matriculation exam, he started composing songs with a band called Southern Born. Shortly after, he began distributing some self-made songs online. In 2009, he was first contacted by Htein Win, a member of Rock Star group. Bunny Phyoe began working with mainstream artists, collaborating with Ki Ki Kyaw Zaw and artists from the Frenzo Production of Sai Sai Kham Leng. In the same year, he started singing on the stage in Thadingyut Festival organized by Bo Bo Entertainment.

Since 2011, Bunny Phyoe has been entertaining in Sai Sai Kham Leng's birthday show every year. In 2013, he was featured in three songs of Sai Sai Kham Leng's album, Date Date Kyel. A Lwan Pyay A Nan, included in the album Pyaw Sayar Gyi, helped Bunny Phyoe achieve some recognition. He launched his debut album Chit Tel Hote on 20 November 2011. The Chit Tel Hote video album was released on December 19, 2012. His second album, titled Lu Pyo Hlae Tay, was released on December 1, 2013.

His first digital mini-album, My Little Birthday Treat, was distributed via the internet. In the following three months, a dual album called DUO was released together with his friend and collaborator Ki Ki Kyaw Zaw. The Lu Pyo Hlae Tay video album was released on October 4, 2015.

On November 25, 2016, the 5th anniversary of his debut album, Bunny Phyoe released his 3rd studio album, Lucky. On 7 September 2018, the album Neon Dreams was released, featuring an electro pop sound. Bunny Phyoe's music style is different from most Burmese artists, as he composes and produces songs within the genre of electronic dance music. On 1 April 2019, Frenzo released an animation music video for "Nga Yee Zar Ka Po Mite Tal" (my girlfriend is better than yours) a collaboration between Frenzo artists Bunny Phyoe, Sai Sai Kham Leng, Nay Win, Phyo Lay, Ki Ki Kyaw Zaw, G Fatt and John, which is one of the tracks in Sai Sai Kham Leng's album Sai Sai is Sai Sai was released on 1 April 2018. The music video became widely popular since the day released it on Sai Sai Kham Leng's official Facebook page and YouTube channel, and was praised for the animation quality and music video created by Pencell Studio. That music video was earned 1 million views within 24 hours and then 2 million views in seven days.

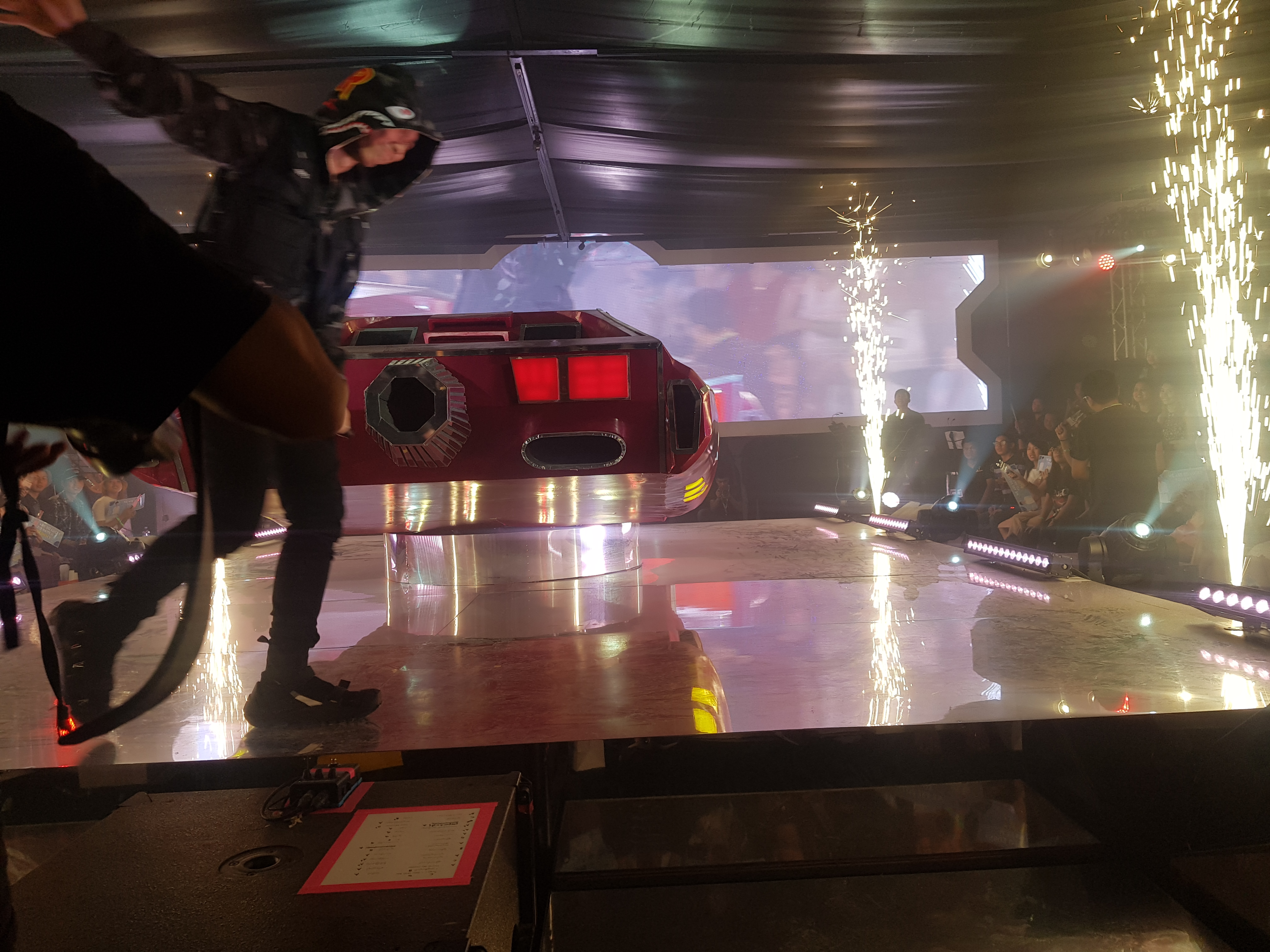
Bunny Phyoe at Dreamworld 2020 Concert

=== Acting career ===
He has been presenting and acting in a travel documentary called "Let's Go" together with other artists, Hlwan Paing, Kyaw Htut Swe, Nan Thu Zar, Nan Myat Phyo Thin, and Bobby Soxer.

While he planned to present in "Let's Go To Europe", an extension of Let's Go Programme, he also started acting in his first main-character TV series named CHARM directed by Thar Nyi in February 2016. Both seasons of CHARM have been shown on MNTV and Channel 9

=== Advertising ===
He was assigned as brand ambassador of Sony earphones in 2015 and also as brand ambassador of Coca-Cola in 2016.

=== Tours ===
In December 2014, he performed his first solo concert called Dreamworld Concert 2014. He went to Singapore to entertain in 2014 and 2015, respectively with Frenzo Production program; and he also travelled and entertained in Australia and the USA in 2015.

Dream World Concert in 2020.

An Evening with Bunny : Rooftop Experience Yangon and Mandalay in 2023

== Discography ==
=== Solo albums ===
- "ချစ်တယ်ဟုတ်" Chit Tel Hote (Love me?) (2012)
- "လူပျိုလှည့်တေး" Lu Pyo Hlae Tay (Bachelors' Song) (2015)
- "လပ်ကီး" Lucky (Lucky) (2016)
- "နီယွန်အိပ်မက်များ" Neon Dreams(2018)
  - "An Evening with Bunny" (2022)
  - "An Evening with Bunny : Rooftop Experience Yangon (Live)" (2023)
  - "Me and My Alter-ego : Side A" (2023) [ 2023 December 31 ]
  - "Me and My Alter-ego : Side B" (2024) [ 2024 January 1 ]
  - "Hay Marn" (2025)
  - "Gein Hman" (2025)
  - "Wa Than" (2025)

=== Dual album ===
- DUO (2014)

=== Collaborative albums ===
- "ပျော်စရာကြီး" Pyaw Sayar Gyi
- "ချစ်တယ်" Chit Tel
- "ချစ်သူ့အနား" Chit Thu A Nar
- "ဖြစ်ချင်ရင်ဖြစ်အောင်လုပ်" "Phyit Chit Yin Phyit Aung Lote"
- "ဟစ်ဟော့စစ်သည်" Hip Hop Sit The
- "ဒိတ်ဒိတ်ကြဲ" Date Date Kyel
- "ဂီတစာဆို" Gi Ta Sar So
- "ခါချနေရတယ်" Khar Cha Nay Ya Tel

== Filmography ==
=== Television series ===
- Charm (2016)
- Charm (Season 2) (2018)

== Personal life ==
Bunny Phyoe was in relationship with Hanna Yuri, a makeup artist and model, and posted photos of them on Facebook. She appeared in two of Bunny Phyoe's music videos, Hnit Pat Lel and Ma Net 4 Nar Yee. In 2016, he answered in an interview that his relationship with Hanna Yuri had ended.

He celebrated his 24th birthday with orphans and his fans at a KFC fast food restaurant in Yangon on 9 July 2016.
