= G Fatt =

Burmese singer and actor

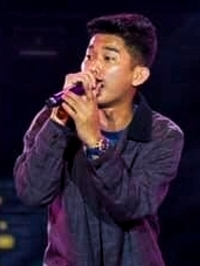

Background information
- Born: Myat Thu; 31 December 1992 (age 33); Yangon, Myanmar
- Genre: Hip hop
- Occupations: Singer-songwriter, rapper, actor
- Instruments: Vocal; Piano; Guitar
- Years active: 2007–present

G Fatt (Burmese: ဂျီဖက်)Myat Thu; born 31 December 1992) is a Burmese singer, songwriter, rapper, and actor. He is considered one of the most commercially successful Burmese singers. G Fatt released his debut album Gin on 21 February 2016, which became the best-selling album of the year.

== Early life and education ==
G Fatt was born on 31 December 1992 in Yangon, Myanmar to parent Nyo Oo and his wife Myint Myint Wai. He is the youngest son of two siblings, having an elder sister. He attended high school at Basic Education High School No. 2 Thingangyun. He is currently studying in Myanmar major at the Dagon University.

== Music career ==
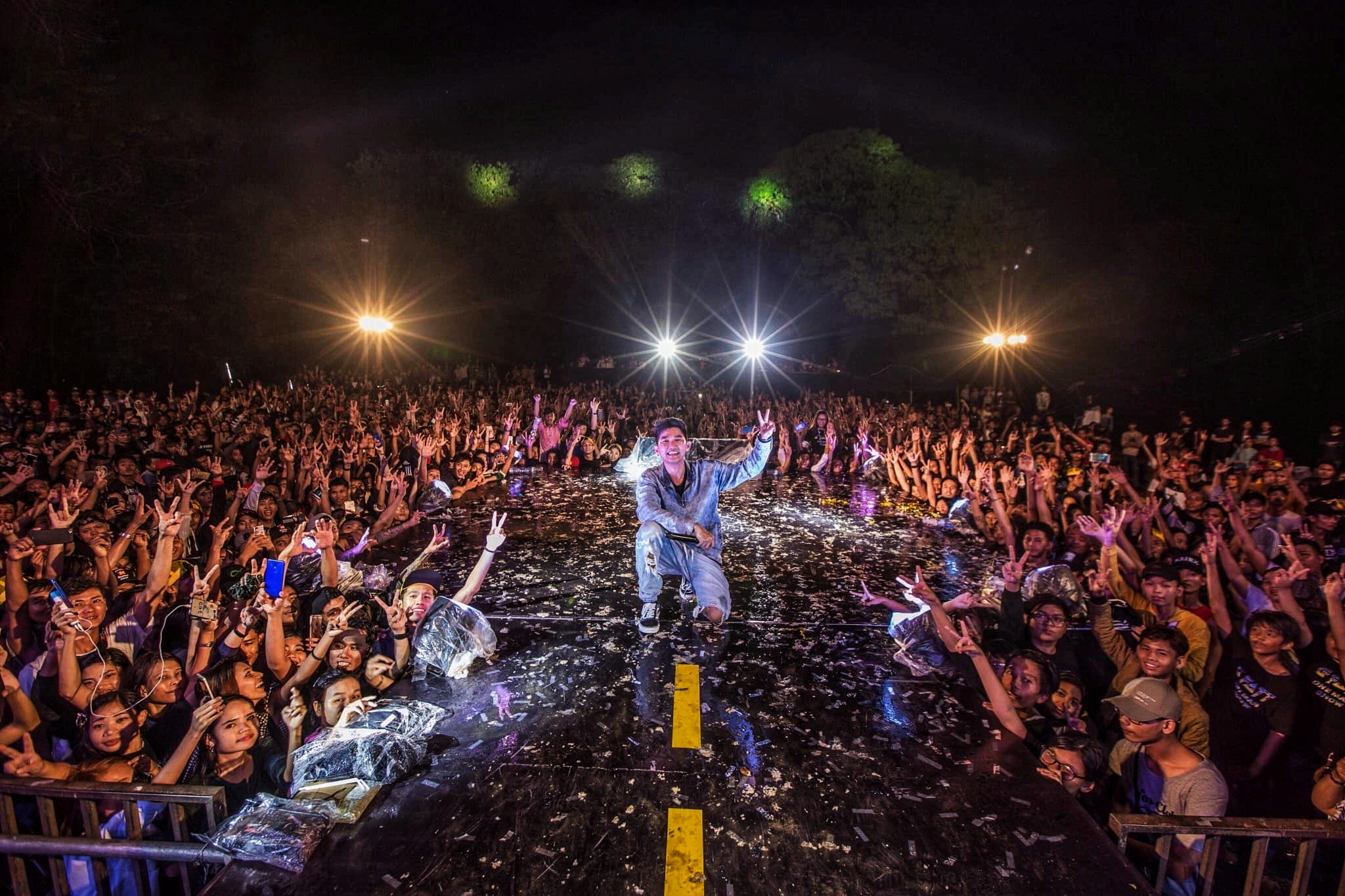
G Fatt is performing in a concert

G Fatt started out on his music career in the underground outfit and released underground hip-hop songs since before he got his big break. He first participated in group album "Amone Kabar Mha Nae Swel Myar" (The dates from hate world). He gained recognition in music industry with his songs "8 Day, 8 Month, 8 Hour" and "Pyi Pa Thoe Pay Sar" (A letter to my love abroad). The songs became widely popular and major hits in Myanmar since the day he released it on online. Since then, he gained the first recognition from his fans and participated in many group albums, stage performances, and many concerts at various locations throughout Myanmar.

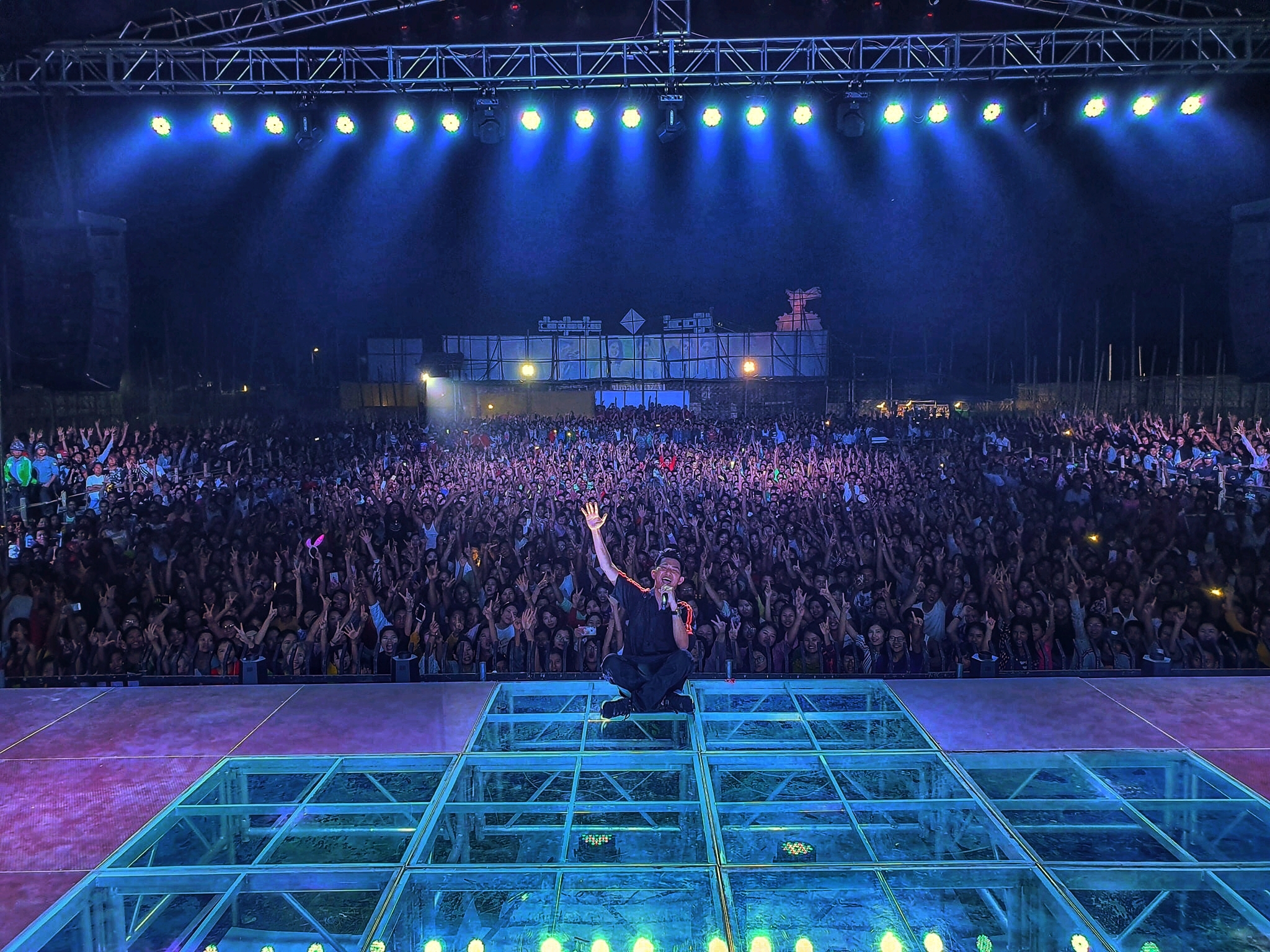
G Fatt is performing in a concert

In 2016, G Fatt started working with Frenzo Production, a major music production company in Myanmar and owned by Sai Sai Kham Leng. Since them, he started entertaining in Sai Sai Kham Leng's birthday show every year. G Fatt started endeavoring to be able to produce and distribute a solo album. He launched his debut solo album "Gin" on 21 February 2016 which turned out to be a success creating him a place to stand in Myanmar music industry. His second solo album "120/B" was released on 2 March 2018.

On 1 April 2019, Frenzo released an animation music video for "Nga Yee Zar Ka Po Mite Tal" (My girlfriend is better than yours) collaborating with Frenzo artists G Fatt, Sai Sai Kham Leng, Nay Win, Phyo Lay, Bunny Phyoe, Ki Ki Kyaw Zaw and John, which is one of the tracks in Sai Sai Kham Leng's album "Sai Sai is Sai Sai", was released on 1 April 2018. The music video became widely popular since the day released it on Sai Sai Kham Leng's official Facebook page and YouTube channel, and was praised for the animation quality and music video created by Pencell Studio. That music video was earned 1 M views within 24 hours and then 2 M views in 7 days.

=== One Man Shows ===
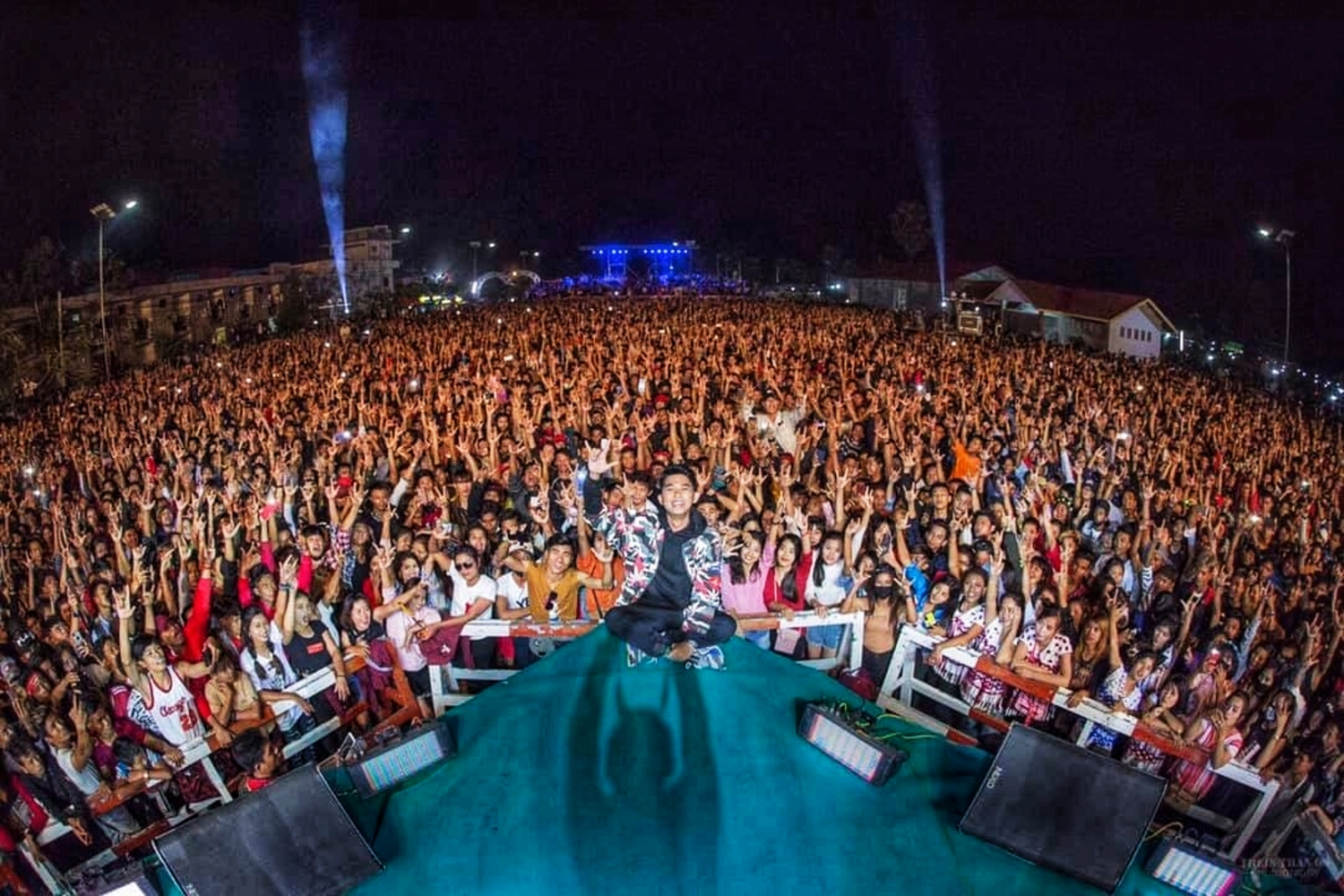
G Fatt is performing in his first one-man show concert

On 11 November 2018, G Fatt performed his first one-man show concert in the open area of Myaw Sin Island, Kandawgyi. Even with drizzling rain at the start of the concert, a huge crowd of loyal fans were celebrate and enjoy the concert in the rain.

On 13 January 2021, he hosted his third one-man show named Illusion Paradise via online and TV.

== Acting career ==
G Fatt made his acting debut in the Burmese hip hop life film Ko Tha Mine Ko Yay Kya Thu Myar 2, where he played the main role with local hip hop artists include Yone Lay, Ya Tha, Kyat Pha, J Fire, Pyone Mya Thwe, Su Nandar Aung and others. The film is directed by Joe and which premiered in Myanmar cinemas on 12 January 2018.

== Political activities ==
Following the 2021 Myanmar coup d'état, G Fatt was active in the anti-coup movement both in person at rallies and through social media. Denouncing the military coup, he has taken part in protests since February. He joined the "We Want Justice" three-finger salute movement. The movement was launched on social media, and many celebrities have joined the movement.

On 3 April 2021, warrants for his arrest were issued under section 505 (a) of the penal code by the State Administration Council for speaking out against the military coup. Along with several other celebrities, he was charged with calling for participation in the Civil Disobedience Movement (CDM) and damaging the state's ability to govern, with supporting the Committee Representing Pyidaungsu Hluttaw, and with generally inciting the people to disturb the peace and stability of the nation.

G Fatt faced a public criticism after his appearance at the military-held Thingyan festival in Naypyidaw on April 13, 2023.

== Filmography ==
=== Film (Cinema) ===
- Ko Tha Mine Ko Yay Kya Thu Myar 2 (ကိုယ့်သမိုင်းကိုယ်ရေးကြသူများ ၂) (2018)

== Discography ==
=== Solo albums ===
- Gin (ဂျင်) (2016)
- 120/B (2018)

== Awards ==
- The Most Requested Song Award 2017, with Gin album, awarded by City FM

=== Other awards ===
1st Major M Music Awards (2018)

Year	Recipient	Award	Result
2018	120/B	Best Hip Hop Album	Won
2018	120/B	Album of the Year	Nominated
2018	G Fatt	Artist of the Year	Nominated
