= Ashin Sandadika =

Burmese Theravada Buddhist monk and writer

- အရှင်ဆန္ဒာဓိက
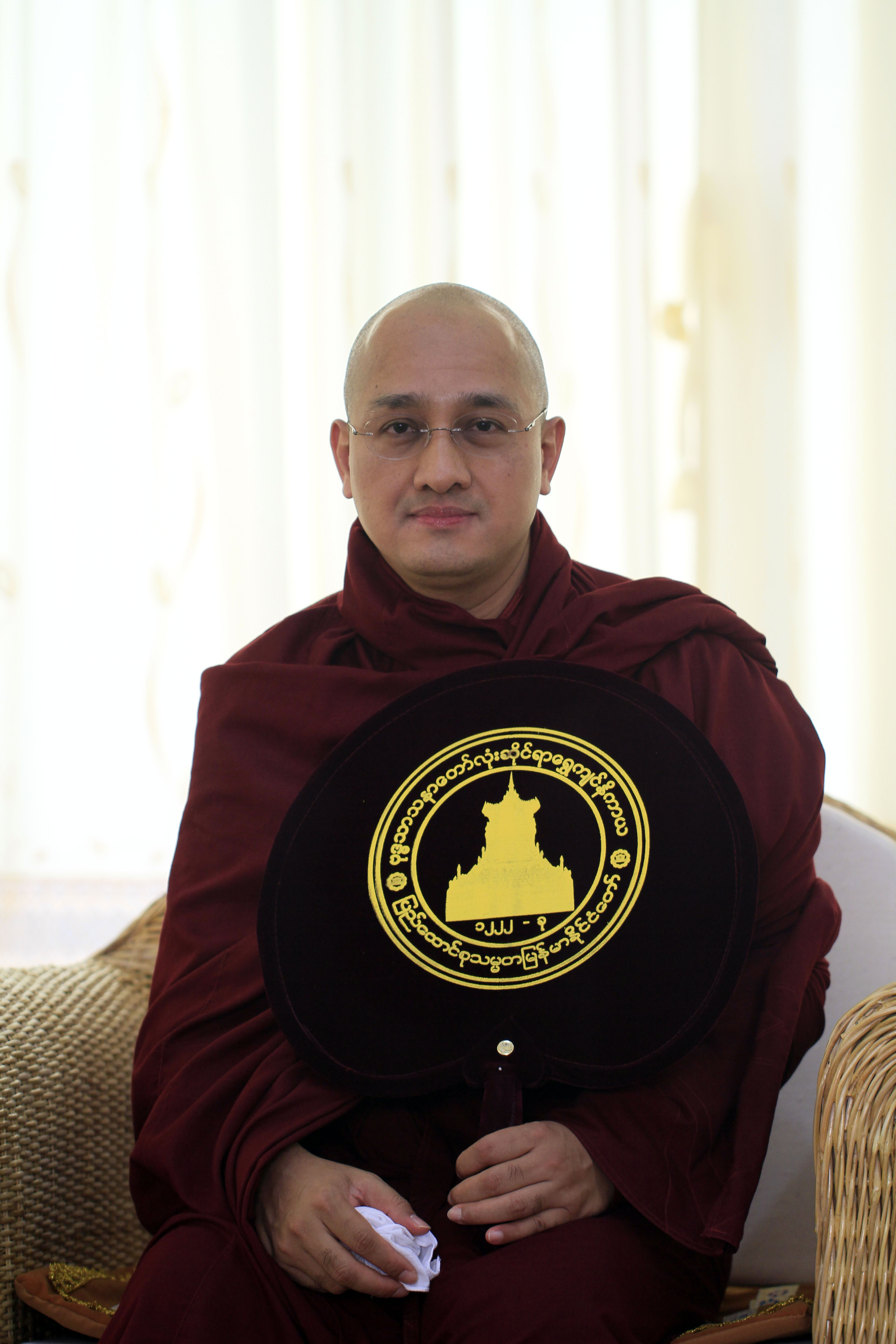
- Title: Sayadaw

Personal life
- Born: 9 January 1968 (age 58) Yenangyaung, Magwe Division, Burma
- Occupation: Buddhist monk

Religious life
- Religion: Buddhism
- Temple: Shwe Parami Forest Monastery
- School: Theravada
- Dharma names: Chandādhika ဆန္ဒာဓိက
- Website: shweparami.net

Ashin Sandadika (Burmese: အရှင်ဆန္ဒာဓိက, Pali: Chandādhika) is a prominent Burmese Theravada Buddhist monk and writer.

== Biography ==
Ashin Sandadika was born on 9 January 1968 in Myazeinyaung Thahtaygon ward, Yenangyaung, Magwe Division to parents U Sein Win and Thein Thein. He matriculated from high school in 1984 with distinctions in all 6 subjects, with a score ranking him second in the country.

After graduating high school, he forsook medical school and instead ordained into Mahagandhayon Monastery, a well-known monastery based in Amarapura, to study the Pitaka. In 1992, he was conferred the title of Pahtamakyaw (ပထမကျော်ဘွဲ့) and in 1995, he was conferred the title of Dhammacariya (Blessed Noble Dharmafarer, Banner of the Teaching) (ဓမ္မာစရိယဘွဲ့).

In 1998, he began publishing written works. Ashin Sandadika currently resides at his own monastery, Shwe Parami Forest Monastery (ရွှေပါရမီတောရကျောင်း) on Kelatha Mountain, Thaton.

He helped establish the Shwe Parami Health Foundation.

In recent years, he was led interfaith dialogue in Myanmar. In 2013, in the aftermath of 2013 Burma anti-Muslim riots in Meiktila, he criticized the use of the 69 symbol by the 969 Movement. He has also spoken against the use of violence against protesting students by authorities in Letpadan Township.

Ashin Sandadika endorsed a petition in 2014 to revise Section 436 of the Constitution of Burma, which would remove the military's automatic bloc veto on constitutional change, by reducing the veto threshold for amendments from 75% to 70% majority.

== Bibliography ==
- Examine One's Mind (ကိုယ့်စိတ် ကိုယ်စစ်) (1998)
- Keep Solitude, Keep Focus (တစ်ယောက်ထဲနေ တစ်စိတ်ထဲထား) (1998)
- What Will You Do Before You Die? (မသေခင် ဘာလုပ်ကြမလဲ) (1999)
- Which House Will You Live In? (ဘယ်အိမ်မှာ နေကြမလဲ) (2000)
- Oh, Which Donor? (အိုဘယ့်အလှူရှင်) (2000)
- Is Splitting Ways Pitiful? (လမ်းခွဲတာ ဝမ်းနည်းစရာလာ) (2002)
- Refueling with the Melody of Dhamma (စိတ်အားဖြည့် ဓမ္မသံစဉ်) (2004)
- Testing Death Before Dying (တကယ်မသေခင် အစမ်းသေကြည့်ရအောင်) (2004)
- One Who Neither Loves nor Hates (မချစ်တတ်မမုန်းတတ်တဲ့သူ) (2004)
- Living Far, but Not Far Away (အနေဝေးပေမဲ့ အဝေးနေမဟုတ်ပါ) (2005)
- One Who Dies Beautifully (အသေလှတဲ့သူ) (2012)
- Spirit of Giving (ပရဟိတစိတ်ဓာတ်) (2013)
- Impermanence is the Friend of the Virtuous (သေခြင်းတရားသည် သူတော်ကောင်းတို့၏ မိတ်ဆွေ) (2016)
