= Medal for Excellent Performance in Social Field =

National medal for social development in Myanmar

The Medal for Excellent Performance in Social Field (Burmese: လူမှုထူးချွန်တံဆိပ်) is a national medal of Myanmar bestowed by the Government of the Republic of the Union of Myanmar. It is awarded to individuals who have demonstrated exceptional service and significant contributions to the social development, welfare, and humanitarian sectors of the country.

== History ==
The award was established as part of the Myanmar honors system to recognize civilians and public servants under the Medals for Outstanding Performance. The medal was not awarded prior to 2014 and was initially limited to recognizing achievements in the fields of arts, science, medicine, and technology. On 5 December 2014, the president of the Republic of the Union of Myanmar issued Order No. 74/2014, which created and introduced new categories of the Medals for Outstanding Performance in administrative, social, economic, and other fields.

Recipients of the award are traditionally announced annually on Independence Day (4 January) and other national days as part of the president's (or head of state's) Honors List.

The medal was infrequently awarded during the administration of the National League for Democracy led by Aung San Suu Kyi. Following the 2021 Myanmar coup d'état, the military government has awarded the medal more frequently, including to some actors and entertainers who publicly expressed support for the military administration and criticized opposition groups such as the National Unity Government (NUG) and the People's Defence Force (Myanmar) (PDF).

In 2026, Senior General Min Aung Hlaing awarded medals to several artists who had participated in military fundraising activities, appeared in military propaganda films, and performed at events held at military frontlines. Many of the recipients had previously faced criticism on social media for their perceived close ties to the military.

According to the Democratic Voice of Burma (DVB), a 12-member committee from the military's Information Sheet Team, led by Major General Aung Myo Thant, the deputy minister of defence, was responsible for selecting and vetting individuals who promoted the military council through various forms of propaganda for the awarding of these medals in 2026.

== Classes ==
The medal is divided into three distinct grades based on the level of contribution:

- Medal for Excellent Performance in Social Field (First Class) (လူမှုထူးချွန်တံဆိပ် (ပထမအဆင့်))
- Medal for Excellent Performance in Social Field (Second Class) (လူမှုထူးချွန်တံဆိပ် (ဒုတိယအဆင့်))
- Medal for Excellent Performance in Social Field (Third Class) (လူမှုထူးချွန်တံဆိပ် (တတိယအဆင့်))

== Criteria ==
Nominees for the Social Excellence Medal must meet a set of twelve criteria established under the Myanmar honors system. These criteria generally recognize individuals who have made significant contributions to social development and public welfare.

Among the requirements, nominees are expected to demonstrate exemplary conduct consistent with the social objectives of building a democratic state, while promoting solidarity, mutual respect, and cooperation among the country's ethnic nationalities. Candidates are also expected to place the interests of the state and society above personal interests, contribute to charitable and social welfare activities, possess good moral character, and show commitment and loyalty to the state and its citizens.

== Revocations ==
In 2022, actress Khine Thin Kyi was awarded the Medal for Excellent Performance in the Social Field (Second Class). However, after she wrote on her social media page indicating that she did not wish to accept the award, it was subsequently revoked by the military council.

In January 2024, the State Administration Council (SAC) announced that the medal (First Class) previously awarded to Saw San Win would be revoked. According to the SAC's Information Team, the decision was made after allegations that he had been involved in terrorist activities.

== See also ==
- Orders, decorations, and medals of Myanmar
- Alinkar Kyawswa
