= Kyaw Kyaw Bo =

Myanmar Actor

- ကျော်ကျော်ဗိုလ်
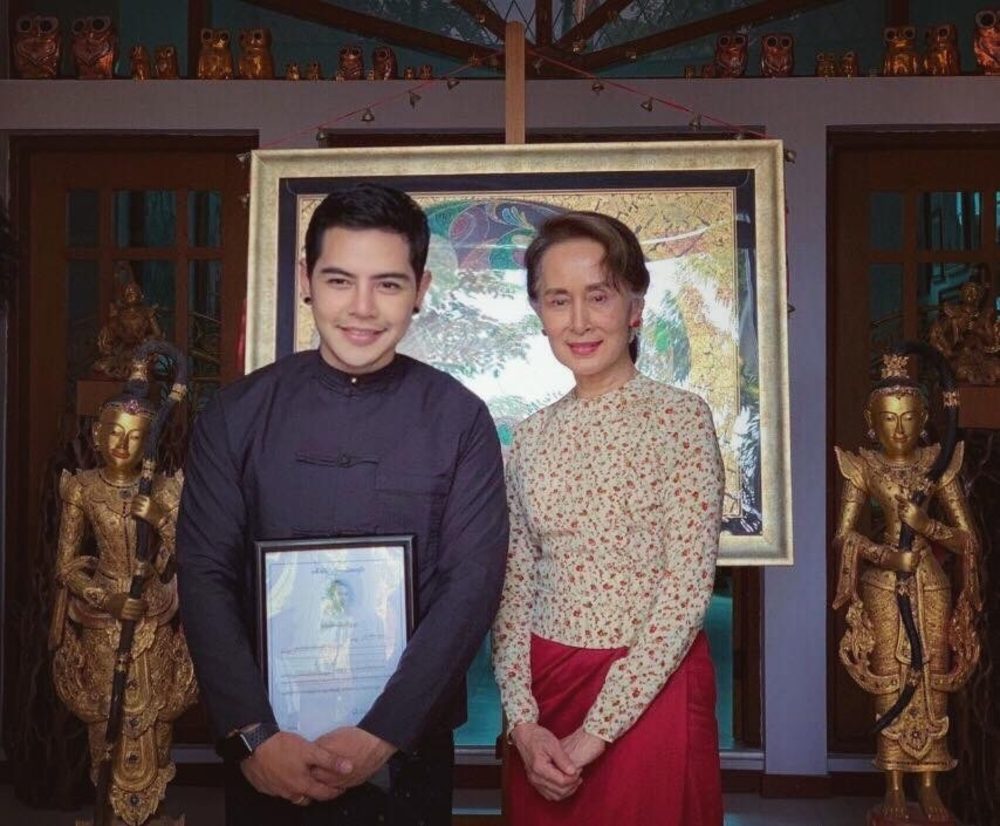
- Kyaw Kyaw Bo with Aung San Suu Kyi in 2019
- Born: Kyaw Kyaw Bo; 17 April 1978 (age 48); Yangon, Myanmar
- Education: Yangon University
- Occupations: Actor, singer, traditional dancer, comedian
- Years active: 1988–present
- Height: 5 ft 7 in (1.70 m)
- Parent(s): Win Bo; Khin Than Myint
- Relatives: Shwe Man Tin Maung (grandfather); Nyunt Win (uncle)
- Awards: Myanmar Academy Award (Best Supporting Actor for 2018)

Kyaw Kyaw Bo (Burmese: ကျော်ကျော်ဗိုလ်; born 17 April 1978) is a Myanmar Academy Award winning Burmese actor, singer, traditional dancer and sometime comedian with the Burmese traditional anyeint troupe Htawara Hninzi. He won the 2018 Myanmar Academy Award for Best Supporting Actor with the film Clinging with Hate. He is best known for his role in the film A Story Long Ago (2010) and The Dark Cinema (2019). Throughout his career, he has acted in over 300 films.

== Early life and education ==
Kyaw Kyaw Bo was born on 17 April 1978 in Yangon, Myanmar. He comes from the thabin family, most of his family members are traditional anyeint dancers and actors. His grandfather Shwe Man Tin Maung, was a respected traditional dancer who was awarded the highest medal of honor "Alinkar Kyaw Swar". His father Win Bo, was a traditional dancer and actor. He is the nephew of the seven-times Myanmar Academy Award winner Nyunt Win, and anyeint actors San Win, Win Maung, and Chan Tha. He is the eldest child among two siblings, having a younger brother. He studied in chemistry majoring at Yangon University for second years.

== Career ==
Kyaw Kyaw Bo started his career as a child actor when he was 10 years old. He first appeared in the film Chit Yin Myat Yay Ma Kya Nae. He then appeared in the films Atar Yay Nae Say Pa Mal and Moe Nae Lay Nae Mone Tine Nae, as a child actor. In 1996, at the age of 18, he worked as a singer of the Mr Guitar Cafe in Yangon for 4 years. In 2001, he debuted as an anyeint dancer in his uncle's anyeint troupe Thitsar Myittar Shwe Man Thabin for 4 years.

In 2006, he signed with Min Film Production as their lead actor. He made his acting debut with a leading role in the film Bal Thu Pyaw Lal Ta Taw Lone Kyway, alongside Kyaw Hein and Thet Mon Myint, directed by Kyi Phyu Shin. He then starred in his second film Ka Ka Ka, alongside Dwe, Soe Myat Thuzar and Myat Kaythi Aung, directed by Nyo Min Lwin in 2007. The film was both a domestic hit, and led to increased recognition for Kyaw Kyaw Bo. He gained increased attention and popularity with his performance in the film Shwe Nar Taw Thwin Chit Chin Sa Kar. From 2006 to present, he has acted in over 200 films and 100 big-screen films.

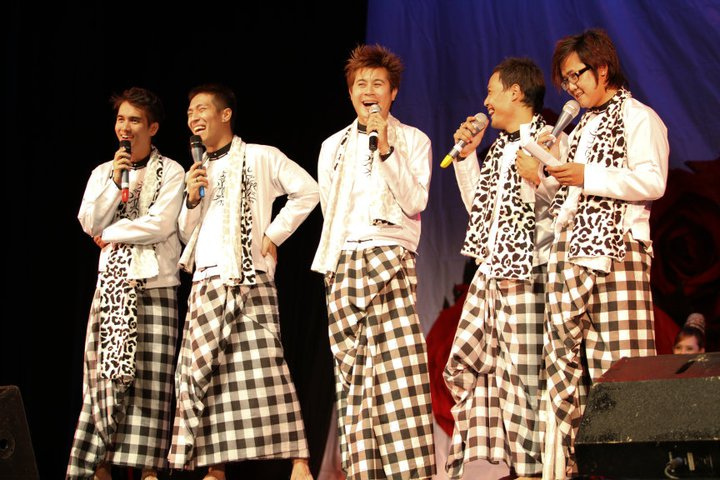
Kyaw Kyaw Bo performing as a comedian in the Eternal Rose Anyeint in Singapore on March 6, 2011.

Since 2007, Kyaw Kyaw Bo has made a name on the stage with the Htawara Hninzi (Eternal Rose) anyeint troupe in which he is one of the supporting comedians along with Nay Toe, Tun Tun, Moe Moe, and Ye Lay. The director of the show is Maung Myo Min. Their shows have been hugely accepted by the resident Burmese audiences as well as Burmese migrants around the globe. Their shows reflect current socio-economic situations.

In 2009, he took on his first big-screen leading role in the drama Chit Kan Pwint Nhint Ma Chaw Lay Se, alongside Eaindra Kyaw Zin, which screened in Myanmar cinemas in 2010. He has been presenting in the popular travel documentary program called Ride on Europe in 2017. The program was aired on MNTV and Channel 9.

In 2018, he starred in the big-screen film Houk Ser where he played the lead role with Myint Myat and Ei Chaw Po which premiered in Myanmar cinemas on 11 January 2019 and received critical acclaim and positive reviews for his portrayal of the character. Kyaw Kyaw Bo co-starred with Nay Toe, Min Thway, Phway Phway and Aye Wutyi Thaung in the religious drama film Clinging with Hate, which won him the 2018 Myanmar Academy Award for Best Supporting Actor. The film was premiered in Myanmar cinemas and also screened in Singapore at the same day and became one of highest-grossing films in Myanmar.

== Filmography ==
=== Film ===
Over 200 films, including

- Chit Yin Myat Yay Ma Kya Nae (ချစ်ရင်မျက်ရည်မကျနဲ့) (1988)
- Atar Yay Nae Say Pa Mal (1988) (အတာရေနဲ့ဆေးပါ့မယ်)
- Moe Nae Lay Nae Mone Tine Nae (မိုးနှင့်လေနှင့်မုန်တိုင်းနှင့်) (1988)
- Bal Thu Pyaw Lal Ta Taw Lone Kyway (ဘယ်သူပြောလဲ တတောလုံးကြွေ) (2006)
- Ka Ka Ka (က က က) (2007)
- Shwe Nar Taw Thwin Chit Chin Sa Kar (ရွှေနားတော်သွင်း ချစ်ခြင်းစကား) (2008)

=== Film (Cinema) ===
Over 100 films, including

- A Story Long Ago (2010)
- Min lal Bo-K Ngar lal Bo-K (2016)
- Honey Moon (2017)
- Kabar Kyaw Ywar (2018)
- Clinging with Hate (2018)
- Wone Pyit Lite Mal (2018)
- Mingalar Katin (2018)
- Wit Nyin Sein (2018)
- The Dark Cinema (2019)
- Pyone Shwin Yay Pyaw Yae Lar (2019)
- Bar Lar Lar (2019)
- Houk Sar (2019)
- LadyBoy (2019)
- Two Weeks Notice (2019)
- Golden Princess (2020)

=== TV series ===
- It was on Yesterday 2

== Awards and nominations ==
| Year | Award | Category | Nominated work | Result |
|---|---|---|---|---|
| 2018 | Myanmar Academy Award | Best Supporting Actor | Clinging with Hate | Won |

== Personal life ==
Kyaw Kyaw Bo married to Zar Zar in 2008. They have a daughter.
