= Moe Aung Yin =

Burmese actor

- မိုးအောင်ရင်
- Born: 13 August 1987 (age 38); Rangoon, Burma
- Occupation: Actor
- Years active: 2008–2016
- Parent(s): Aung Yin; Thin Zar Myint
- Relatives: Thin Zar Aung Yin (sister)

Moe Aung Yin (မိုးအောင်ရင်; born 13 August 1987) is a Burmese actor. He is best known for his leading role in Burmese films Allann Za Yar and Gay A Htar.

== Early life and education ==
Moe Aung Yin was born on 28 June 1987 in Yangon, the first son of Burmese singer Aung Yin and Moe Thin Zar Myint. He has a younger sister, Thin Zar Aung Yin. He grew up in Yangon with his family. He wanted to be an actor ever since he was a child. He attended elementary and middle school at Practising School Yangon Institute of Education (TTC) and he switched his school to International Language & Business Centre (I.L.B.C).

== Career ==
Moe was enrolled to go attend a University in UK majoring in directing in 2007. But he signed for the contract with Lucky 7 in Burma as their lead actor for 70 movies, instead of going to UK for his education. He started making movies for the contract in 2008. He has been starred in over 200 films and is one of the stars of the Burmese entertainment industry.

== Controversy ==
On 29 August 2016, Moe Aung Yin was arrested on charges of drug possession. On 26 November 2018, Moe Aung Yin was sentenced to five years in prison with hard labour by a Pazundaung Township Court for violating sections 15/16(c) of the Narcotic Drugs and Psychotropic Substances Law. On 12 December 2018, Moe Aung Yin was sentenced to 12 years in prison with hard labour by a Yangon Eastern District Court after he was found guilty of drug possession and drug abuse. On 7 May 2019, Moe Aung Yin was released from prison upon receiving a pardon from President Win Myint.

Moe Aung Yin is facing a fine and up to a year in prison after his ex-partner filed a lawsuit in Yangon’s Yankin township court under Article 417 of the penal code, which punishes "cheating". His former girlfriend is suing the star for allegedly breaking a promise to marry her, according to local media. News outlet 7 Day Daily reported the lawsuit was filed on November 22 and the actor was due to appear before the court on 6 December 2019.

== Filmography ==
His first movie broke the record of the most selling movie in Burma. His first movie which was shown in theater was also the most famous movie of the time Burma.

=== Film ===
- Hot Shot
- Hot Shot 2
- Hot Shot 3
- A Lann Zayar (2011)
- A Mike Sar (2013)
- A Lann Zayar 2 (2013)
- Mar Kyi Shay (2014)
