= Fortune TV =

Burmese digital free-to-air TV channel

- Logo of Fortune TV
- Broadcast area: Myanmar
- Headquarters: Yangon

Programming
- Language: Burmese
- Picture format: 1080i (16:9 HDTV)

Ownership
- Owner: Fortune Group

History
- Launched: 16 February 2019; 7 years ago

Availability

Terrestrial
- MRTV Multiplex 2 (Myanmar): Channel 5 (HD); RF Channel 35 586 MHz
- MRTV (Myanmar): Channel 19 (SD); RF Channel 31 554 MHz
- Thaicom 6 (Thailand): 3730 H 15000 (SD)
- Sky Net (Myanmar): Channel 49 (SD)
- CANAL+ (Myanmar): Channel 22 (SD)
- Softtech M1 (Myanmar): Channel 5 (SD)
- GMM Z (Thailand): Channel 219 (SD)
- Infosat (Thailand): Channel 119 (SD)

Fortune TV is a Burmese digital free-to-air TV channel that run under MRTV's Multiplex Playout System based in Yangon, Myanmar. Fortune TV is operated by Fortune Group. They have signed a cooperation agreement with state-run Myanmar Radio and Television (MRTV) to operate as content providers for digital free-to-air TV channels in a multi-playout system of MRTV on 17 February 2018. The trial was broadcast on 12 February 2019 and four days later on 16 February, they launched the channel officially. They broadcast entertainment as well as information and knowledge program from 6 a.m. to 12 midnight. Fortune are also providing infotainment content on the FTA and OTT platforms.

== Programming ==
=== Current programs ===
- The Show

==== Local ====
- Ah Saung (2019)
- Ah Saung: season 2 (2020)
- The Rose (2022)

==== International ====
- Huwag Kang Mangamba (Burmese: Sann Kyae Thaww Kan Kyamar) (2021)
- La Vida Lena (Burmese: Maya Galeisar) (2022)

== Availability ==
Terrestrial
MRTV Multiplex 2	Channel 5 (HD); RF Channel 35 586 MHz
MRTV	Channel 19 (SD); RF Channel 31 554 MHz
Satellite
SKY NET	Channel 49 (SD)
CANAL+	Channel 72 (SD)
Softtech Myanmar	Channel 5 (SD)
