= Monywa University =

University in Monywa, Myanmar

Coordinates: 22°08′11″N 95°10′07″E

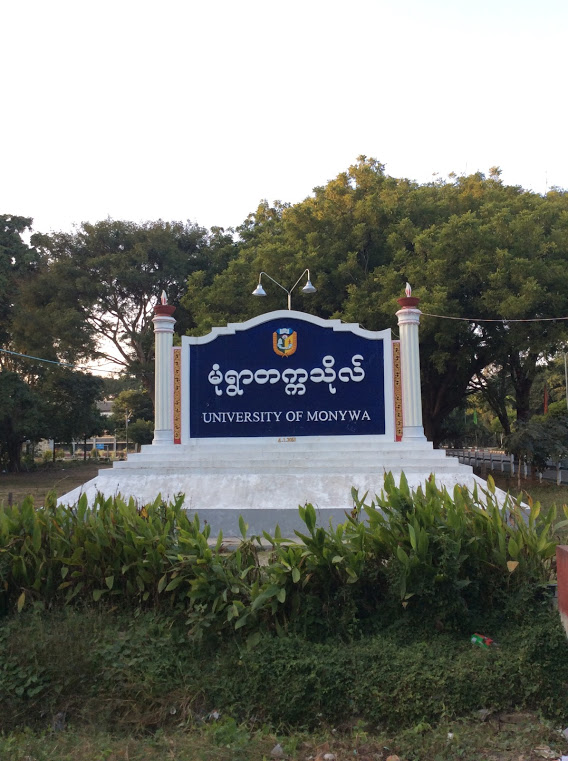

Monywa University (Burmese: မုံရွာတက္ကသိုလ်) is a co-ed higher education institution located in Monywa, Sagaing Region, in northwestern Myanmar. The university is officially recognized by the Department of Higher Education of the Ministry of Education. Courses and programs that lead to officially recognized higher education degrees in several areas of study are offered to local and foreign students. The university provides academic and non-academic facilities as well as a library and administrative services to students.

In 2014, students from Monywa University launched a campaign protesting the National Education Bill. They feared that the bill would centralize decision-making and give too much power to the Ministry of Education.
