= Aye Wutyi Thaung =

Burmese actress, model, and singer

- အေးဝတ်ရည်သောင်း
- Born: 27 May 1984 (age 42); Yangon, Burma
- Other names: Aye Thaung, Pauk-si
- Occupations: Actress, model, singer
- Years active: 1997–2011, 2016–present
- Height: 5 ft 6 in (1.68 m)

Aye Wutyi Thaung (Burmese: အေးဝတ်ရည်သောင်း; born 27 May 1984), also known as Aye Thaung, is a Burmese film and television actress, singer and commercial model.

== Early life and education ==
Aye Wutyi Thaung was born on 27 May 1984 in Yangon, Burma. She is the middle one of her three siblings, having an older sister and a younger sister. Her elder sister Hnin Wutyi Thaung is also an actress along with Sweet Wutyi Thaung, who is now working as a singer. She attended high school at Basic Education High School No. 2 Yankin and graduated with chemistry from Dagon University and diploma from MHR Business and Management Institute. Her nickname is Pauk-si (Mantou).

== Career ==
Aye Wutyi Thaung started modeling in 1997 when she was 13 years old. She entered the national hall of fame as a teenager. In 1998, she competed in local pageant Miss Christmas and became a winner. She did not work as an actress for three years during her studying in Management Development Institute of Singapore.

Aye was 15 when she first appeared on screen. She appeared in about 40 commercials, more than 100 direct-to-videos and 3 films at that time. She also acted for magazine cover photos and wallpapers. She also singing and released her solo music album Lawe Lawe Lay.

In 2011, she completely disappeared from the screens for six years when she was busy with her business. In 2014, she opened a store selling silk, cotton and traditional fabric. "Shwe Loon Than", her shop, was such a success that she opened another one in 2016.

In 2017, she gained popularity again with her nickname Aye Thaung on Facebook, and received many requests to act in films and advertisements. In February 2016, she starred in a television series CHARM 2 alongside Bunny Phyoe. In 2017, she starred in a television series Yadanarbon and also starred in television series Mingalar Shi Thaw Ayet alongside actor Myint Myat and Kelvin Kate in 2018. She is credited in 8 big screen films and over 100 direct-to-videos in her acting career.

Aye was a nominee at 2018 Myanmar Academy Award for Best Supporting Actress.

== Brand ambassadorships ==
She was appointed as brand ambassador for Remax Myanmar and Samsung Myanmar in 2017. On 6 March 2018, she was appointed as brand ambassador for Sunkist Myanmar.

== Political activities ==
Following the 2021 Myanmar coup d'état, Aye Wutyi Thaung was active in the anti-coup movement both in person at rallies and through social media. Denouncing the military coup, she has taken part in protests since February. She joined the "We Want Justice" three-finger salute movement. The movement was launched on social media, and many celebrities have joined the movement.

On 8 April 2021, warrants for her arrest were issued under section 505 (a) of the penal code by the State Administration Council for speaking out against the military coup. Along with several other celebrities, she was charged with calling for participation in the Civil Disobedience Movement (CDM) and damaging the state's ability to govern, with supporting the Committee Representing Pyidaungsu Hluttaw, and with generally inciting the people to disturb the peace and stability of the nation.

== Filmography ==
=== Film (Big Screen Movies) ===
- 10 films, including
- Clinging with Hate (2018)

=== Film ===
- Over 100 films

=== Television series ===
- Charm (2016)
- Yadanarbon (2017)
- Mingalar Shi Tae A Yat (2018)
- Yin Khwin Shin Tan (2019)

== Discography ==
=== Solo albums ===
- Lawe Lawe Lay (Easy) (2005s)

== Awards and nominations ==
| Year | Award | Category | Nominated work | Result |
|---|---|---|---|---|
| 2018 | Myanmar Academy Award | Best Actress in a Supporting Role | Clinging with Hate | Nominated |
| 2018 | Star Award | Best Actress in a Supporting Role | Clinging with Hate | Nominated |
| 2025 | Myanmar Academy Award | Best Actress in a Supporting Role | A Sate | Nominated |
