= Htun Htun =

Burmese actor and singer (born 1983)

Htun Htun (Examplez)
- ထွန်းထွန်း
- Born: Htin Aung Htun; 24 December 1983 (age 42); Rangoon, Burma
- Education: Dagon University
- Occupations: Actor, singer
- Years active: 2001–present
- Spouse: Aye Nyein Thu (m. 2026)
- Relatives: Ant Gyi
- Awards: Myanmar Motion Picture Academy Awards (Best Actor Award for 2016)
- Musical career
- Genres: Hip hop, Pop
- Instruments: Vocals; guitar

Htun Htun (Examplez) (Burmese: ထွန်းထွန်း; born Htin Aung Htun on 24 December 1983) is a Burmese actor and singer. He is best known for his leading roles in several Burmese films. Throughout his career, he has acted as leading actor in over 100 films and 40 Big screen movies.

== Early life and education ==
Htun Htun was born on 24 December 1983 in Yangon, Myanmar. His grandfather Ant Gyi was a prominent Burmese musician. He graduated with a degree B.A (English) from Dagon University.

== Career ==
He started his career in 2001. Four music solo album of Examplez Boy Band Group had been releasing since 2001. Then he worked as composer, singer and music producer. He worked as model in TV commercial, poster, wall-sheets, calendars and magazines, etc. He established his movie industry in 2002.

Since 2007, he has been acting with the Htawara Hninzi (Eternal Rose) Burmese traditional dance group, in which he is one of the comedians, alongside Nay Toe, Moe Moe, Ye Lay and Kyaw Kyaw Bo. He acted as leading actor in over 100 films and 40 Big screen movies. He won the Best Actor Award in Myanmar Motion Picture Academy Awards 2016 for Oak Kyar Myet Pauk film.

== Discography ==
- Superstar

== Filmography ==
=== Film (cinema) ===
Lists of Films
Year	Film	Director	Co-Stars	Role	Notes
2005	Kaba Sone Hti	Khin Maung Oo & Soe Thein Htut	Eaindra Kyaw Zin, Wyne Su Khine Thein		
2015	Chit San Eain 2028	Hein Soe	Lu Min, Htun Eaindra Bo, Pyay Ti Oo, Eaindra Kyaw Zin, Nay Toe, Moe Hay Ko, Min Maw Kun, Wutt Hmone Shwe Yi, Nay Min, Chit Thu Wai, Thinzar Wint Kyaw, Myint Myat, Soe Pyae Thazin	Ko Htwe	
2016	Oak Kyar Myet Pauk	Nyunt Myanmar Nyi Nyi Aung	Nay Toe, Nay Min, Soe Myat Thuzar, Thet Mon Myint	Phoe Tha Kyar	
2016	Khoe Soe Lu Hnite	Steel (Dwe Myittar)	Myint Myat, Khin Hlaing, Nay Dway, Thinzar Wint Kyaw	San Pyar	
2017	Kyauk Kyauk Kyauk	Aww Ratha	Nay Toe, Khin Wint Wah, Nan Myat Phyo Thin, Min Thway, Nang Khin Zay Yar, Kyaw Kyaw, Po Po (singer)	Min Nyo	
2018	Thar Pike Kaung	Steel (Dwe Myittar)	Soe Myat Thuzar, Shwe Thamee	Phoe Shwe La Min	
2018	Bridge of Clouds	Aww Ratha	Nay Toe, Khin Wint Wah, Nguyen Tran Huyen My	Sai Lon	
2018	Mhaw Kyauk Sar	Win Htun Htun	Myint Myat, Shwe Hmone Yati, Thu Htoo San, Phyo Ngwe Soe, May Myint Mo	Wutta Kyaw	
2018	My Rowdy Angel	Win Lwin Htet	Hlwan Paing, Khin Wint Wah, Yan Aung, Kyaw Thu, Htoo Aung, Yell Htwe Aung, Thu Ta Aung, Khaing Thazin Ngu Wah	Rowdy Angel	
2019	Kyar Tot The Lal Maung Sakar	Mee Pwar	Sai Sai Kham Leng, Phway Phway	Phyo Kyaw	
2019	Box No. 88	Win Lwin Htet	Nay Toe, Eaindra Kyaw Zin	That Ti	
2019	Responsible Citizen	Steel (Dwe Myittar)	Nay Toe, Min Maw Kun, Nay Htet Lin, Nay Myo Aung, Zin Wine, Min Thway, Si Phyo, Moe Yan Zun, Htun Ko Ko, Shwe Thamee, Awn Seng	Police Officer Thura Zaw	
2019	Lay Par Kyawt Shein Warazain	Thar Nyi	Min Maw Kun, Nay Min, Min Thway, Si Phyo, Paing Phyo Thu, Shwe Thamee, Than Thar Moe Theint	Wai Warr	
2019	Journey to the Death	Aww Ratha	Nay Toe, Nan Su Oo, May Myint Mo, Tyron Bejay, Joker, Pyae Pyae	Min Aung	
2019	Pa Pa Wadi See Yin Khan	Wyne	Moe Hay Ko, Phway Phway, A Linn Yaung	Thiha Ye Yint	
2020	Players	Pyi Hein Thiha	Myint Myat, Tyron Bejay, Khin Hlaing, Soe Myat Thuzar, Ei Chaw Po, May Mi Ko Ko, Hsaung Wutyee May	Arkar	

=== Television series ===
Lists of Series
Year	Series	Director	Co-Stars	Role	Channel	Note
2016	Shwe Moe Ngwe Moe Thoon Phyo Lo Ywar	Aww Ratha	Ye Lay, Nyi Htut Khaung, Joker, Nan Myat Phyo Thin, Hsu Myat Noe Oo, May Pan Chi, Than Than Soe	Shwe Moe	Myanmar National TV	
2023	An Ugly & Seven Handsomes	-	-	Nay La Maung Maung	Canal+ Zat Lenn	

== Awards ==
Year	Award	Category	Nominated work	Result
2016	Myanmar Motion Picture Academy Awards	Best Actor	Oak Kyar Myet Pauk	Won

== Personal life ==
He is married to Aye Nyein Thu on May 28, 2026.
