= Khin Wint Wah =

Burmese actress, model, screen play, and beauty queen

- ခင်ဝင့်ဝါ
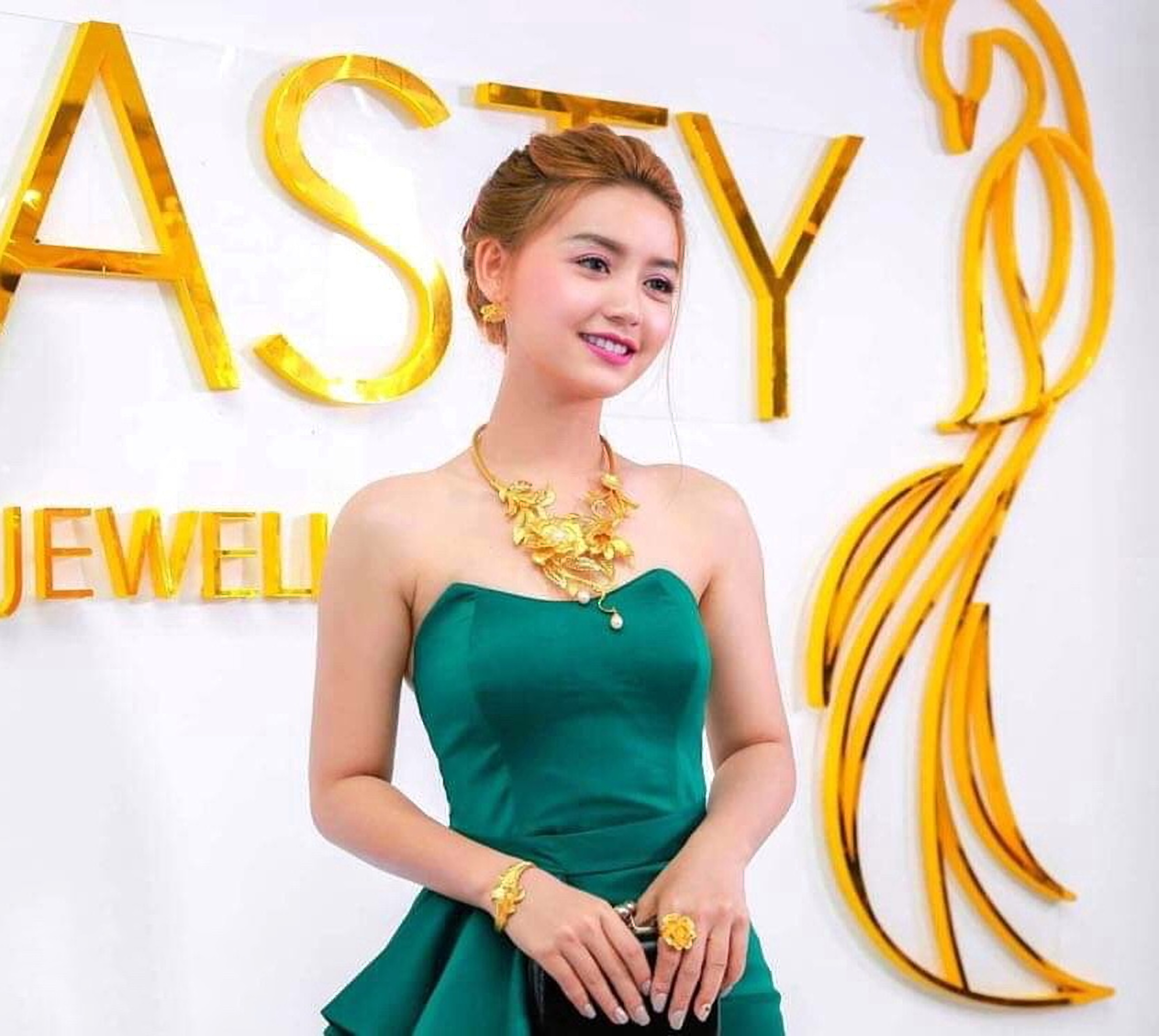
- Khin Wint Wah at the Dynasty Gold & Jewellery event
- Born: Chaw Su Hlaing; September 21, 1994 (age 32); Yangon, Myanmar
- Other name: Khay
- Education: Yangon University
- Occupations: Actress; model
- Years active: 2012–present
- Height: 5 ft 6 in (1.68 m)
- Awards: Miss Supranational Myanmar 2013; Miss Supranational 2013 (Top 20) and (Miss Internet); Myanmar Motion Picture Academy Award (Best Supporting Actress for 2019)

Khin Wint Wah (Burmese: ခင်ဝင့်ဝါ, also spelt Khin Wint War; birth name Chaw Su Hlaing born on 21 September 1994) is a Burmese actress, commercial model and beauty pageant title holder. She was crowned the Miss Supranational Myanmar 2013 and represented Myanmar at the Miss Supranational 2013 and won four continental titles.

Khin was listed in 12 Shortlisted World Top Bell “Most Beautiful Girl of the Year 2013” along with Moe Set Wine, selected by The Beauties Concept.

== Early life and education ==
Khin Wint Wah was born on 21 September 1994 in Yangon, Myanmar to parents Hla Han (လှဟန်) and Kyi Kyi Swe (ကြည်ကြည်ဆွေ). She is the youngest of four siblings, having a brother and two sisters. She attended Basic Education High School No. 2 Bahan. She studied botany at Dagon University until second year and then switched to distance education at the Yangon University and graduated with BSc. Botany.

== Pageantry ==
=== Miss Supranational Myanmar 2013 ===
Khin previously competed at the Miss MK Gem 2012 and won "Queen of Beauty Award ". She competed in Miss Supranational Myanmar 2013 which was held on 21 May 2013 in Yangon. She became the winner of Miss Supranational Myanmar after the competition.

=== Miss Supranational 2013 ===
She represented Myanmar at the Miss Supranational 2013 pageant which was held on 17 August to 6 September in Minsk, Belarus, along with beauties from 98 other nations. She was placed in the top 20 and won four continental titles for Miss Internet Award, Most Beauty Girl in the World Award, People Choice Award and Face of Miss Supranational Award.

== Acting career ==
=== 2014: Beginnings and film debut ===
Khin Wint Wah started her acting career, after the competition in Miss Supranational 2013. She made her acting debut with the Burmese film Fairy and Me, where she played the leading role with an actor Kaung Pyae and directed by Kyi Phyu Shin in 2014.

=== 2016–present: Breaking into the big screen and success ===
In 2016, she took on her first big-screen leading role in the romance film Thingyan Pyatike (Thingyan Museum) alongside Sai Sai Kham Leng, directed by Maung Myo Min (Yin Twin Phit), and which screened in Myanmar cinemas on 1 April 2016. She has been acting in over 30 big screen movies and over 80 direct-to-videos in her acting career. In 2017, she portrayed the female lead in the big-screen film Bridge of Clouds alongside Nay Toe, Tun Tun and Nguyễn Trần Huyền My, which premiered in Myanmar cinemas on 13 July 2018.

== Brand ambassadorships ==
Khin was appointed as brand ambassador for Camella Cosmetic, Daw Win Garment and Line Myanmar in 2014. And also appointed as brand ambassador of Oppo from 2015 to 2016, and re-appointed as brand ambassador of Oppo for F3 smartphone from 2016 to 2017. In 2018, she was appointed as brand ambassador for Sofy Eva.

== Humanitarian works ==
In 2013 October, Khin Wint Wah visited the Myanmar Greenland Youth Development Center in Hlegu Township, together with Miss Supranational Myanmar Organization team, and donate food and clothes to orphan children.

She also participated in the concert for the river's flood victims, which erupted in 2015. Collecting funds, and donated to flood victims in the effected regions.

== Political activities ==
Following the 2021 Myanmar coup d'état, Khin Wint Wah was active in the anti-coup movement both in person at rallies and through social media. Denouncing the military coup, she has taken part in protests since February. She joined the "We Want Justice" three-finger salute movement. The movement was launched on social media, and many celebrities have joined the movement.

On 2 April 2021, warrants for her arrest were issued under section 505 (a) of the Myanmar Penal Code by the State Administration Council for speaking out against the military coup. Along with several other celebrities, she was charged with calling for participation in the Civil Disobedience Movement (CDM) and damaging the state's ability to govern, with supporting the Committee Representing Pyidaungsu Hluttaw, and with generally inciting the people to disturb the peace and stability of the nation.

== Filmography ==
=== Film (cinema) ===
Lists of Films
| Year | Film | Director | Co-Stars | Role | Notes |
|---|---|---|---|---|---|
| 2015 | Kyun Taw Yee Sar Pha Yar Mhar Nay The | Panchi Soe Moe | Soe Yan Aung, Moe Yu San | | |
| 2016 | Thingyan Museum | Maung Myo Min | Sai Sai Kham Leng, Nan Su Oo | Mya Thar | |
| 2017 | Cho Myain Thaw Let Sar Chay Chin | Mee Pwar | Sai Sai Kham Leng, Shwe Hmone Yati | Candy | |
| 2017 | Kyauk Kyauk Kyauk | Aww Ratha | Nay Toe, Htun Htun, Min Thway, Kyaw Kyaw, Nan Myat Phyo Thin, Nang Khin Zay Yar, Po Po | Thar Yar | |
| 2017 | Yauk Pha Sit Sin Yay | | Zay Ye Htet,Yar Zar Nay Win, May Panchi | | |
| 2017 | Fashion | | Zay Ye Htet, Myanmar Pyi Thein Tan, Nu Nandar Than | | |
| 2017 | Cele | | Min Maw Kun, Htun Htun, Nyi Htut Khaung, Nang Khin Zay Yar, Moe Pyae Pyae Maung | | |
| 2018 | Bridge of Clouds | Aww Ratha | Nay Toe, Htun Htun, Nguyen Tran Huyen My | Dr. Pann Hla Phyu | |
| 2018 | Shal Chway Ma | Ko Zaw (Ar Yone Oo) | Aung Ye Lin, Yan Aung, Soe Myat Thuzar, Htet Htet Moe Oo | Hsaung Than Zin | |
| 2018 | My Rowdy Angel | | Hlwan Paing,Htun Htun,Yan Aung,Kyaw Thu,Htoo Aung | | |
| 2019 | Palpitation in the Breeze | Wyne | Moht Moht Myint Aung, Phway Phway, Kyaw Ye Aung | Kyi Pyar | |
| 2019 | Caution! Danger | | Myint Myat, Yone Lay, Tyron Bejay | | |
| 2020 | Mite Mae Chit | Zaw Myo | Myint Myat, Shwe Hmone Yati | Ka Thit Ni | |
| 2023 | Mone Khwint | | Shwe Htoo, Henry San, May Myint Mo | | |
| 2023 | The Alphabet I Hate | | Aung Ye Lin, Tyron Bejay, Soe Myat Thuzar | | |
| 2024 | Shwe Kyi Ngwe Kyi | | Shwe Htoo, Khin Hlaing, May Thinzar Oo | | |
| 2024 | Milk Rice | | Myint Myat, Phyo Ngwe Soe, Soe Myat Thuzar | | |
| 2024 | Dance of Mind | | Kyaw Ye Aung, Sai Sai Kham Leng, Myo Thandar Htun | | |
| 2024 | Mee | | Nay Win, Aye Chan Maung, Poe Mamhe Thar | | |
| 2025 | Byaw Than | | Nay Win, Phyo Ngwe Soe, Myo Thandar Htun, Aye Wutyi Thaung | | |
| 2025 | Five Plus One | | Hlwan Paing, Wint Yamone Naing, May Mi Ko Ko | | |
| 2025 | Beautiful Ghost | | Shwe Htoo, Khin Hlaing | | |
| 2026 | Lake Pyar Khwae Chain | | A Linn Yaung, May Toe Khine | | |
| 2026 | Phoe Kauk | | Nay Toe, Nay Myo Aung, Shein Tin Htoo, Nyi Nanda, Lin Zarni Zaw | | |
| 2026 | Nyo Ki | | Nay Toe, Myint Myat, Soe Myat Thuzar, Melody | | |
| 2026 | Ko Atta Nae Ko | | Kyaw Htet Aung, Aye Chan Maung, Nyi Nada | | |

=== Television series ===
Lists of Series
| Year | Series | Director | Co-Stars | Role | Channel | Note |
|---|---|---|---|---|---|---|
| 2019 | A Kyin Nar Myit Phyar | Thar Nyi | Moe Yan Zun, Htet Htet Htun, Htoo Aung, Wai Lyan, May Kabyar Oo | Chaw Su | MRTV-4 | |
| 2023 | Ah Mone | Wyne | Chan Min Ye Htut, Moe Hay Ko, Min Oo, Nyi Nanda, Khin Zarchi Kyaw, Moe Pwint Phyu, Thonedray Oo | Yamone Aye | Mahar | |
| 2025 | I'm Queen | Wyne | A Linn Yaung, Htet Htet Htun, Khin Moht Moht Aye, Soe Moe Kyi | Baydar Phyu | Mahar | |
