= Htet Yan =

Burmese singer and actor (born 1994)

Htet Yan ထက်ယံ
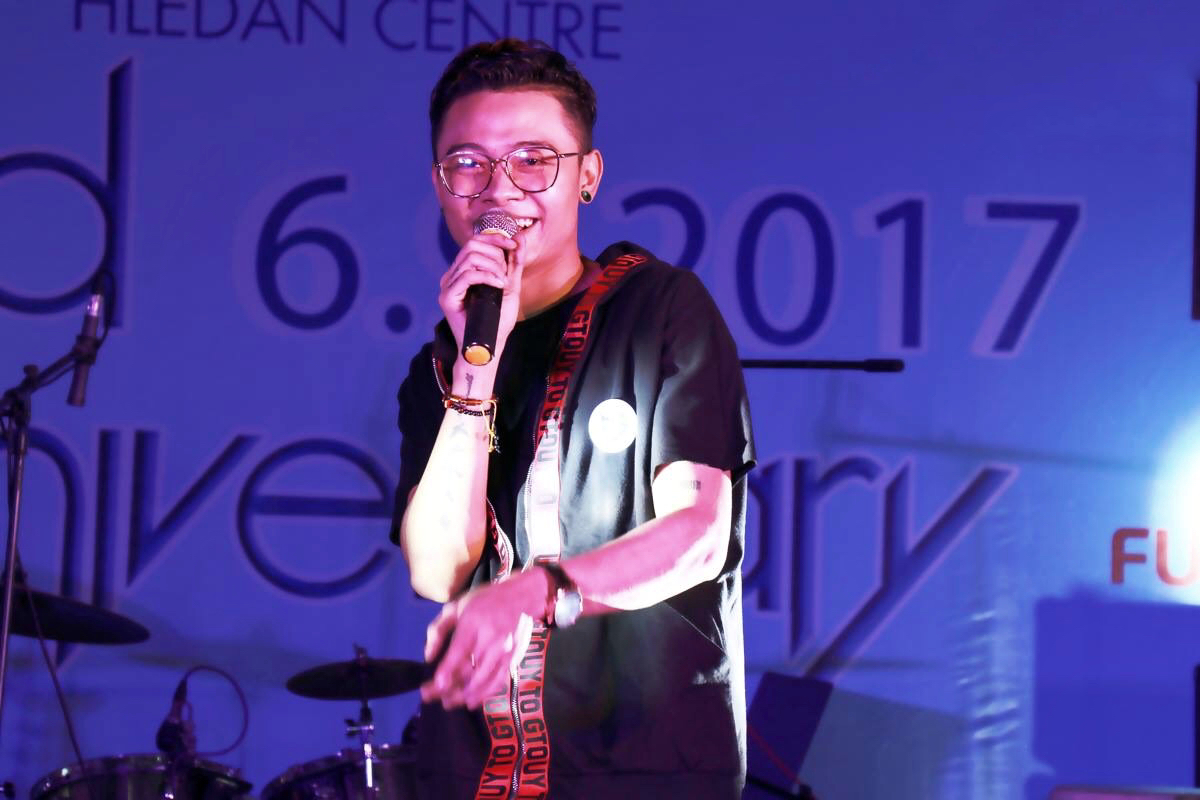

Background information
- Born: Nyein Htet Aung; 18 October 1994 (age 31); Meiktila, Myanmar
- Genres: R&B; pop; hip hop; soul
- Occupations: Singer-songwriter; actor
- Instrument: Vocals
- Years active: 2011–present

Htet Yan (Burmese: ထက်ယံ; born Nyein Htet Aung on 18 October 1994) is a Burmese singer and actor. He is considered one of the most successful Burmese singers and has risen to fame with his debut album New (2016).

== Early life and education ==
Htet Yan was born on 18 October 1994 in Meiktila, Mandalay Region, Myanmar to Aye Thein and Kyu Kyu. He is the youngest son of two siblings, having an elder brother. He attended high school at Basic Education High School No. 1 Meiktila. In 2010, he relocated Yangon, the capital city of Myanmar to follow his passion and attend university. He then enrolled at the National University of Arts and Culture, Yangon, and graduated with a degree in Cinematography & Drama in 2013.

== Music career ==
=== 2011–2014: Beginnings and recognition ===
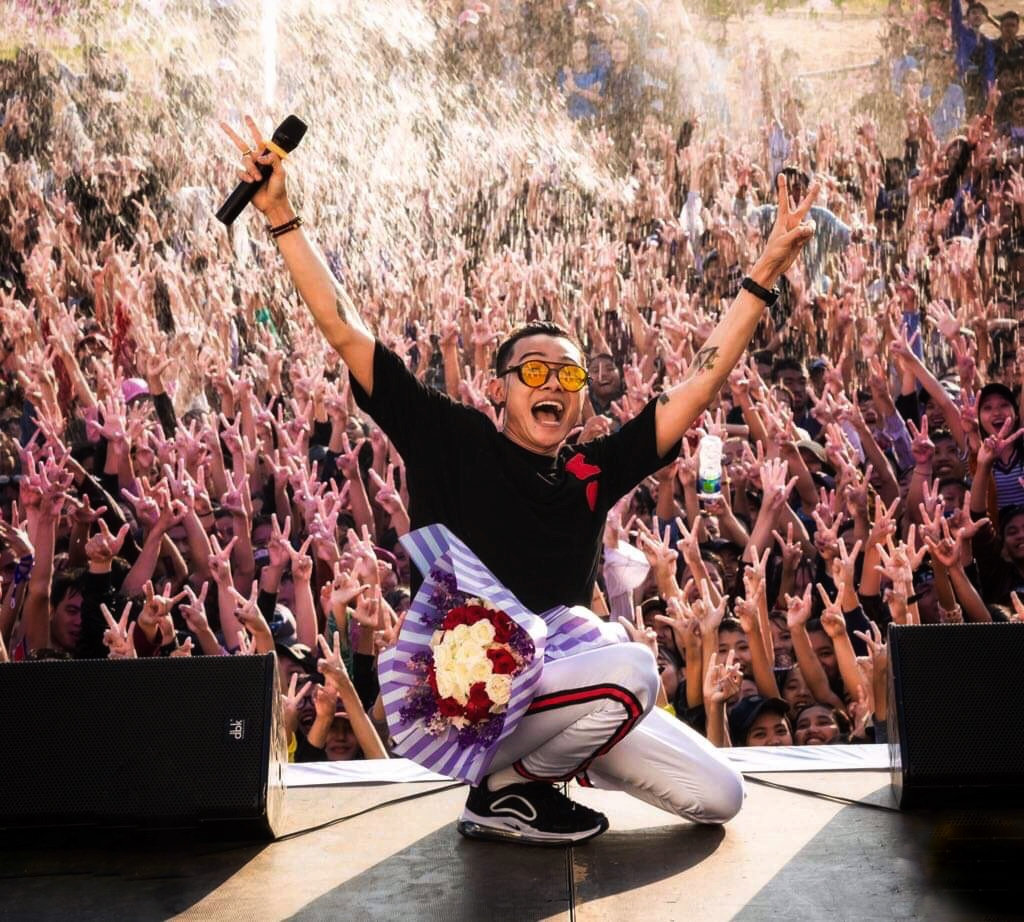
Htet Yan performs in a concert

His passion and dream is becoming a singer therefore he relocated to the Yangon from Meiktila. He began his music career in 2011 while still a university student. He released a lot of songs and mixtapes, collaborating with his friends. He has become popular due to "No More Cry" song from Yair Yint Aung and Thar Thar's collaboration album A Mone Diary in 2012. Since then, he gained the first recognition from his fans.

In 2013, he participated in the group album Bo Bo Anniversary with a song "Nin Lo Chin Tha Lo". And then he directed and acted in "Nin Lo Chin Tha Lo" music video. In 2014, he released an album 4 Album which was a collaboration album with other artists Shwe Htoo, X-Box, and Lil'z.

=== 2015–2016: Solo debut and rising popularity ===
In 2015, Htet started endeavoring to be able to produce and distribute his first solo album. He launched his debut solo album New on 20 February 2016. After 8 months later, he released his second solo album October 18 on his birthday which turned out to be a success creating him a place to stand in Myanmar music industry.

=== 2017–present: One Man Show and nationwide hit ===
On 9 June 2017, Htet embarked on his first one-man show concert "In My Life", performed together with many other artists such as Yair Yint Aung, Shwe Htoo, X-Box, Lil'z, Oasix, and Y-Zet in Mandalay. He released a live show album "In My Life" on 4 January 2018.

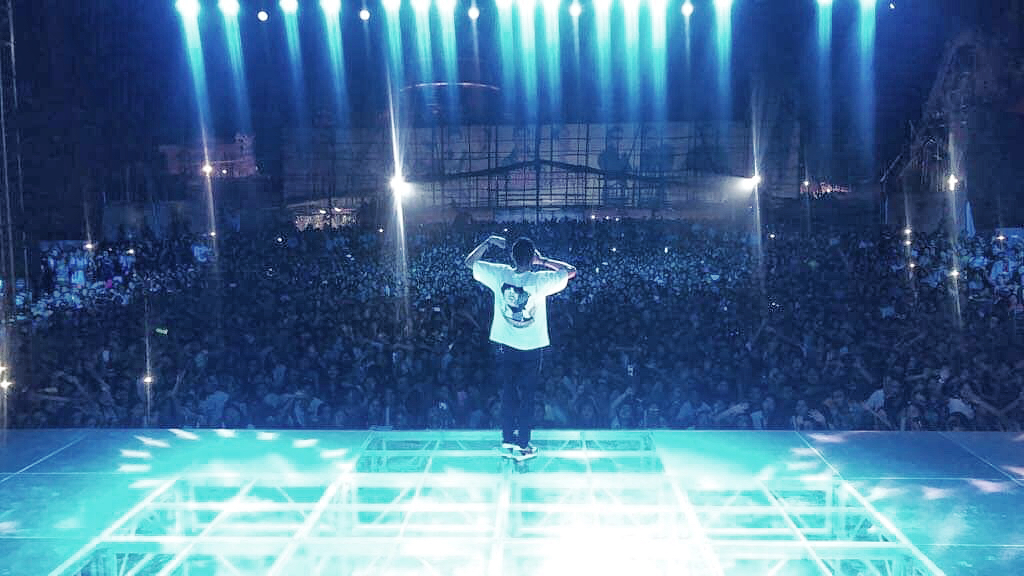
Htet Yan is performing in a concert in Yangon

On 21 October 2018, he released a duo album Shae Me Nout Me with singer Thar Thar, which spawned more huge hits. Many music industry records have followed since then. One of the songs from that album named "Nway Thwar Tal" (Makes Me Feel Warm) song which proved a smash, hitting the number one slot in the country, gained him to nationwide recognition and that song has been one of the all-time hit in his career.

== Acting career ==
Htet made his acting debut in the Burmese military action film Special 9, where he played the main role with local hip hop artists including Yone Lay, Myint Myat, Nine One, Thar Thar, Ice Cold, and others. The film was directed and written by singer Yone Lay, which premiered in Myanmar cinemas on 7 September 2018.

== Filmography ==
=== Film (Cinema) ===
Year	English title	Burmese title	Role	Notes
2018	Special 9	အထူးတပ်ဖွဲ့ဝင်(၉)ဦး	Htet Yan	Main role

== Discography ==
=== Solo albums ===
- New (2016)
- October 18 (2016)
- Gravity (2020)

=== Collaboration albums ===
- 4 Album (2014)

=== Live show albums ===
- In My Life (2018)

=== Duo albums ===
- Shae Me Nout Me (ရှေ့မှီနောက်မှီ) (2019)
