= Cho Myain Thaw Let Sar Chay Chin =

2017 Burmese film

- film poster
- Burmese: ချိုမြိန်သောလက်စားချေခြင်း
- Directed by: Mee Pwar
- Screenplay by: Moe Ni Lwin
- Based on: Cho Myain Thaw Let Sar Chay Chin by Lun Htar Htar
- Produced by: Khine Mar Win
- Starring: Sai Sai Kham Leng; Shwe Hmone Yati; Khin Wint Wah
- Production company: Shwe Si Taw Film Production
- Release date: May 19, 2017
- Running time: 120 minutes
- Country: Myanmar
- Language: Burmese

Cho Myain Thaw Let Sar Chay Chin (Burmese: ချိုမြိန်သောလက်စားချေခြင်း) is a 2017 Burmese drama film, directed by Mee Pwar starring Sai Sai Kham Leng, Shwe Hmone Yati and Khin Wint Wah. The film, produced by Shwe Si Taw Film Production premiered Myanmar on May 19, 2017.

== Cast ==
- Sai Sai Kham Leng as Min Nyo
- Shwe Hmone Yati as Eant Htar May
- Khin Wint Wah as Candy, Hnin Nu Hnin Si
- Han Lin Thant
- Mone
