= Phyo Ngwe Soe =

Burmese actor

- ဖြိုးငွေစိုး
- Born: 28 April 1982 (age 44); Burma
- Years active: 2000–present

Phyo Ngwe Soe (Burmese: ဖြိုးငွေစိုး ; born 28 April 1982) is a Burmese actor.

Phyo is considered one of the most successful actor in Burmese cinema. Throughout his career, he has acted in over 176 films.

== Filmography ==
=== Film (Cinema) ===
- A Chit The Lay Pyay (2002)
- Ko Tint Toh Super Yat Kwat (2014)
- Mhaw Kyauk Sar (2018)
- Tin String (2019)
- Guest (2019)
- Ananda: Rise of Notra (2019)

=== Television series ===
- Charm (2016)

== Acting career ==
In 2019, he played in the Burmese big screen film Tin String movie directed by Arkar and alongside Eaindra Kyaw Zin, Shwe Eain Si, Ye Naung and Yell Htwe Aung. The same year, he took in the film "Guest " alongside Shwe Htoo, Shwe Hmone Yati, Nay Chi Oo.
