= James Appietu-Ankrah =

Ghanaian politician

Hon. James Appietu-Ankrah

Member of Ghana Parliament for Lower West Akim Constituency
- In office 7 January 2005 – 6 January 2009
- President: John Agyekum Kufour

Personal details
- Born: 6 July 1948 (age 77) Akim, Eastern Region Gold Coast (now Ghana)
- Party: New Patriotic Party
- Education: Adisadel College
- Alma mater: Cambridge Tutors College
- Occupation: Politician
- Profession: Insurance broker

James Appietu-Ankrah (born 6 July 1948) is a Ghanaian politician and a member of the Fourth Parliament of the Fourth Republic representing the Lower West Akim Constituency in the Eastern Region of Ghana.

== Early life and education ==
Ankrah was born on 6 July 1948 in Akim, a town in the Eastern Region of Ghana. He received his secondary school education from Adisadel College. He enrolled in Cambridge Tutors College and achieved a Diploma in marketing.

== Career ==
Ankrah is an insurance broker and is on board of SIC Insurance Company Limited as the Independent non-executive director since 2017. He is a former member of parliament for the Lower West Akim constituency from 2005 to 2009.

== Politics ==
Ankrah was first elected into parliament on the ticket of the New Patriotic Party during the December 2004 Ghanaian general elections for the Lower West Akim Constituency in the Eastern Region of Ghana after he won the Party's Primary Election. He polled 22,239 votes out of the 38,198 valid votes cast representing 58.20%.

== Personal life ==
Ankrah is a Christian.
