= Mite Mae Chit =

2020 Burmese film

- film poster
- Burmese: မိုက်မဲချစ်
- Directed by: Zaw Myo
- Screenplay by: Ingyin Han
- Based on: Mite Mae Chit by Lun Htar Htar
- Produced by: Ma Aye Aye Win
- Starring: Myint Myat; Shwe Hmone Yati; Khin Wint Wah
- Production company: Lucky Seven Film Production
- Release date: January 9, 2020
- Running time: 120 minutes
- Country: Myanmar
- Language: Burmese

Mite Mae Chit (Burmese: မိုက်မဲချစ်) is a 2020 Burmese drama film, directed by Zaw Myo starring Myint Myat, Shwe Hmone Yati and Khin Wint Wah. The film, produced by Lucky Seven Film Production premiered Myanmar on January 9, 2020.

== Cast ==
- Myint Myat as Htit Chone Moe
- Shwe Hmone Yati as Mal Yun Bone
- Khin Wint Wah as Ka Thit Ni
