= Kyar Tot The Lal Maung Sakar =

2019 Burmese film

- Film Poster
- Burmese: ကြာတော့သည်လည်းမောင့်စကား
- Directed by: Mee Pwar
- Screenplay by: Moe Ni Lwin
- Based on: Kyar Tot The Lal Maung Sakar by Ju
- Starring: Sai Sai Kham Leng; Phway Phway; Htun Htun
- Production company: Shwe Si Taw Film Production
- Release date: February 1, 2019 (Myanmar)
- Running time: 113 minutes
- Country: Myanmar
- Language: Burmese

Kyar Tot The Lal Maung Sakar (Burmese: ကြာတော့သည်လည်းမောင့်စကား) is a 2019 Burmese drama film, directed by Mee Pwar starring Sai Sai Kham Leng, Phway Phway and Htun Htun. It is based on the popular novel of the same name of Ju. It is the second time shot film of this novel. The film, produced by Shwe Si Taw Film Production premiered in Myanmar on February 1, 2019.

== Cast ==
- Sai Sai Kham Leng as Nanda
- Phway Phway as Tin Tin Zaw
- Htun Htun as Phyo Kyaw
