= Tin String =

2019 Burmese horror film

- Film poster
- Burmese: ကြိုးဖုန်း
- Directed by: Arkar
- Starring: Phyo Ngwe Soe; Eaindra Kyaw Zin; Shwe Eain Si; Ye Naung; Yell Htwe Aung
- Production company: Golden Hour Film Production
- Release date: November 21, 2019
- Running time: 120 minutes
- Country: Myanmar
- Language: Burmese

Tin String (Burmese: ကြိုးဖုန်း, romanized: Kyo Phone) is a 2019 Burmese horror film directed by Arkar and starring Phyo Ngwe Soe, Eaindra Kyaw Zin, Shwe Eain Si, Ye Naung and Yell Htwe Aung. The film, produced by Golden Hour Film Production and premiered in Myanmar on November 21, 2019.

== Cast ==
- Phyo Ngwe Soe as Ye Thway
- Eaindra Kyaw Zin as Thel Chit Yar
- Shwe Eain Si as Nan Eain Shin
- Ye Naung as Sai Naung
- Aung Ye Htwe as Htoo Lwin
