= Bridge of Clouds =

- တိမ်တိုက်တံတား
- Directed by: Aw Ra Tha
- Written by: Moe Ni Lwin
- Produced by: 7th Sense Film Production
- Starring: Nay Toe; Khin Wint Wah; Htun Htun; Nguyen Tran Huyen My
- Release date: 13 July 2018
- Country: Myanmar
- Languages: Burmese; English

Bridge of Clouds (Burmese: တိမ်တိုက်တံတား) is a 2018 Burmese drama film directed by Aw Ra Tha starring Nay Toe, Khin Wint Wah, Htun Htun, and Vietnamese actress Nguyen Tran Huyen My. The film was produced by 7th Sense Film Production.

== Plot ==
Pann is a doctor assigned to a government hospital in a small town of Shan State. During a stormy night, an unknown patient arrived to the hospital. The patient was seriously injured by hail and also suffered from malaria. After the incident, he didn't remember anything about himself. For the medical record, hospital staff then decided to give him the name That Tant, meaning Rainbow in Burmese. Since That Tant forgot where he came from, he decided to stay at the hospital and help patients and other people. Time has been passed and That Tant became attached to the town which is now his home. At a traditional festival, a tourist took a photo of That Tant dancing in the festival, and uploaded it to a social network. The photo was then found by May, a girlfriend of That Tant who is living in Australia. May decided to come to Myanmar and search That Tant.

== Cast ==
- Nay Toe as Thet Tant. His real name is Daniel, May's boyfriend.
- Khin Wint Wah as Dr. Pann Hla Phyu
- Htun Htun as Sai Lon
- Nguyen Tran Huyen My as May
