= Wit Nyin Ka Kyoe =

2017 Burmese film

- film poster
- Burmese: ဝိညာဉ်ကကြိုး
- Directed by: Steel (Dwe Myittar)
- Screenplay by: Min Nyi
- Based on: Wit Nyin Ka Kyoe by Ponnya Khin
- Produced by: Khayan Pyar
- Starring: Aung Ye Lin; Thinzar Wint Kyaw; Shwe Hmone Yati
- Cinematography: Mano V. Narayanan
- Production company: Khayay Phyu Film Production
- Release date: June 16, 2017
- Running time: 120 minutes
- Country: Myanmar
- Language: Burmese

Wit Nyin Ka Kyoe (Burmese: ဝိညာဉ်ကကြိုး) is a 2017 Burmese drama film, directed by Steel (Dwe Myittar) starring Aung Ye Lin, Thinzar Wint Kyaw and Shwe Hmone Yati. The film, produced by Khayay Phyu Film Production premiered Myanmar on June 16, 2017.

== Cast ==
- Aung Ye Lin as Thit Khat Nyo
- Thinzar Wint Kyaw as Khit Thamee
- Shwe Hmone Yati as Shwe Pyo Phyu
