= Lay Par Kyawt Shein Warazain =

2019 Burmese film

- Film Poster
- Burmese: လေးပါးကျော့ရှိန်ဝရဇိန်
- Directed by: Thar Nyi
- Screenplay by: Aung Gyi
- Story by: Aung Gyi
- Starring: Min Maw Kun; Htun Htun; Nay Min; Min Thway; Si Phyo; Paing Phyo Thu; Shwe Thamee; Than Thar Moe Theint
- Cinematography: Mano V. Narayanan
- Production company: Arr Mhan Film Production
- Release date: 25 January 2019
- Running time: 120 minutes
- Country: Myanmar
- Language: Burmese

Lay Par Kyawt Shein Warazain (Burmese: လေးပါးကျော့ရှိန်ဝရဇိန်) The Wrath of Four Titans is a 2019 Burmese drama film, directed by Thar Nyi starring Min Maw Kun, Htun Htun, Nay Min, Min Thway, Si Phyo, Paing Phyo Thu, Shwe Thamee and Than Thar Moe Theint. The film, produced by Arr Mhan Film Production premiered in Myanmar on January 25, 2019.

== Cast ==
- Min Maw Kun as Kyet Pha Gyi
- Htun Htun as Wai Warr
- Min Thway as San Shay
- Si Phyo as Pwal Sar
- Paing Phyo Thu as La Yaung Phway
- Shwe Thamee as Nay Chi Phyar
- Nay Min as Thurain
- Than Thar Moe Theint as Than Thar
