= Thingyan Museum =

2016 Burmese film

- Film Poster
- Burmese: သင်္ကြန်ပြတိုက်
- Directed by: Maung Myo Min
- Screenplay by: Min Khite Soe San; Htet Myat Naing Zin
- Based on: Thingyan Museum by Min Khite Soe San
- Starring: Sai Sai Kham Leng; Khin Wint Wah; Nan Su Oo
- Cinematography: Ko Toe; Zaw Phyo
- Edited by: Nyan Wint
- Production companies: Frenzo Production; Heart & Soul Film Production
- Release date: April 1, 2016 (Myanmar)
- Running time: 126 minutes
- Country: Myanmar
- Language: Burmese

Thingyan Museum (Burmese: သင်္ကြန်ပြတိုက်) is a 2016 Burmese romantic-drama film, directed by Maung Myo Min starring Sai Sai Kham Leng, Khin Wint Wah and Nan Su Oo. The film, produced by Frenzo Production and Heart & Soul Film Production premiered in Myanmar on April 1, 2016.

== Cast ==
- Sai Sai Kham Leng as Sai Sai
- Khin Wint Wah as Mya Thar
- Nan Su Oo as Hazel
- Aung Lwin as Aphoe
- Si Thu as Phoe Shoute
