= Y-Zet =

Burmese hip hop singer (born 1989)

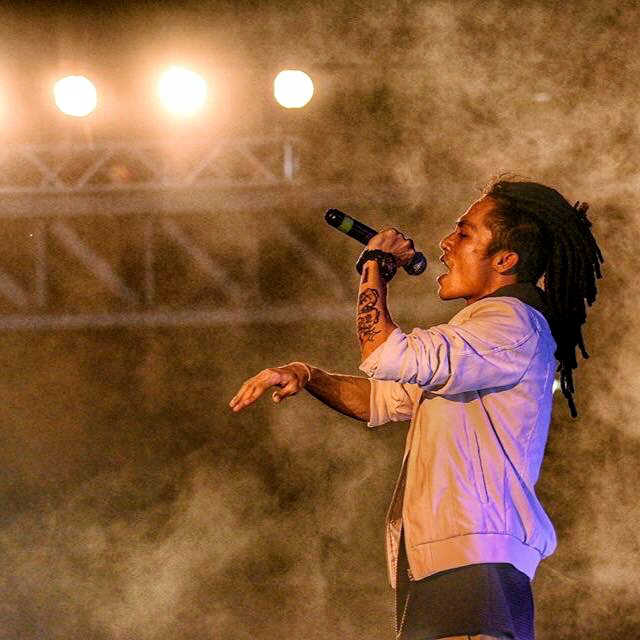

Background information
- Born: Htet Nway Oo; 28 May 1989 (age 36); Pyin Oo Lwin, Myanmar
- Genres: Hip hop, Rap Rock
- Occupation: Singer-songwriter • Rapper
- Instrument: Vocals
- Years active: 2009–present
- Member of: Oasix

Y-Zet (Burmese: ဝိုင်ဇက်; born Htet Nway Oo on 28 May 1989) is a Burmese hip hop singer. He is one of the most popular hip hop singers in Myanmar and rose to fame with his debut album Pyaw San Par which was a duo album with singer Oasix.

== Early life and education ==
Y-Zet was born on 28 May 1989 in Pyin Oo Lwin, Myanmar to parents: Sein Maung and his wife Thet Thet Ye. He is the eldest son of two siblings, having a younger sister. He attended high school at Basic Education High School No. 4 Pyin Oo Lwin and also attended Sar Pann Aein Private School with the goal of graduating high school. He enrolled for the chemistry major at Yadanabon University, and then he dropped out of university in his second year, back in 2008.

== Career ==
=== 2009–2013: Career beginnings in underground ===
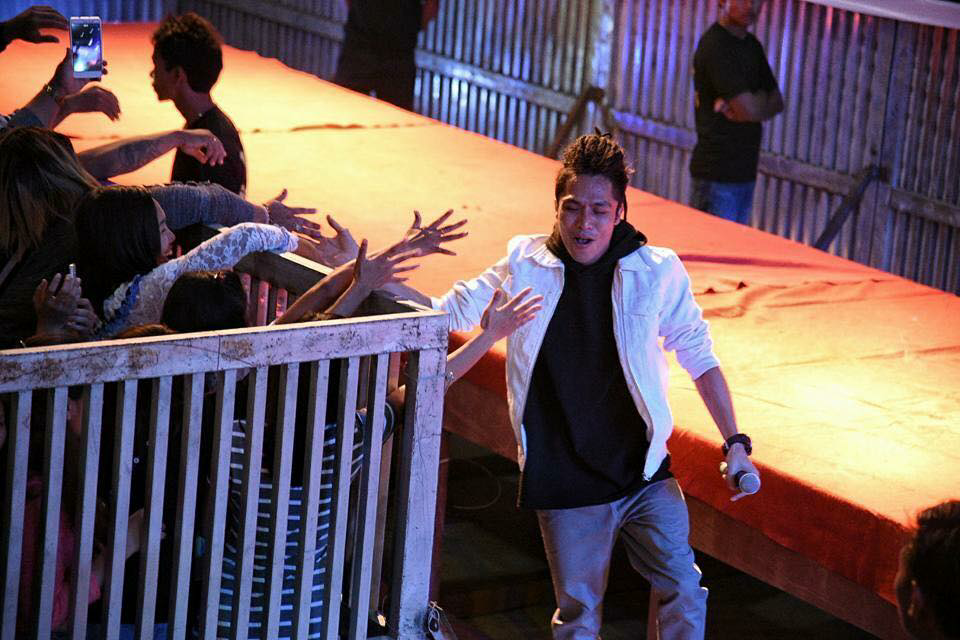
Y-Zet in a concert

Y-Zet started out on his music career in 2009, as a singer in the underground music industry. Shortly after, he released a duet mix-tape "The Collaboration" with his friend Alatt in 2010.

In 2011, he joined a native underground hip hop crew Wildboy and released a lot of songs and mix-tapes, collaborating with Wildboy's members. In the meantime, he made a song called "Shwee Die" (Flying fire cracker) collaborating with two of the members from Wildboy who were closest to him, Oasix and Moe Aung, beefing mainstream hip hop singer Hlwan Paing's song "Done Pyan" (Rocket). In 2013, he released his solo mix-tape "My Mistake" and two of the tracks, "Ma Mae Say" and "A Yin Lo" were on top of the charts of underground hip hop. Since then, he gained his first recognition from his fans and he engaged in shooting commercial advertisements, stage performances, and many concerts at various locations throughout Myanmar.

=== 2014–2016: Reached the mainstream and nationwide recognition ===
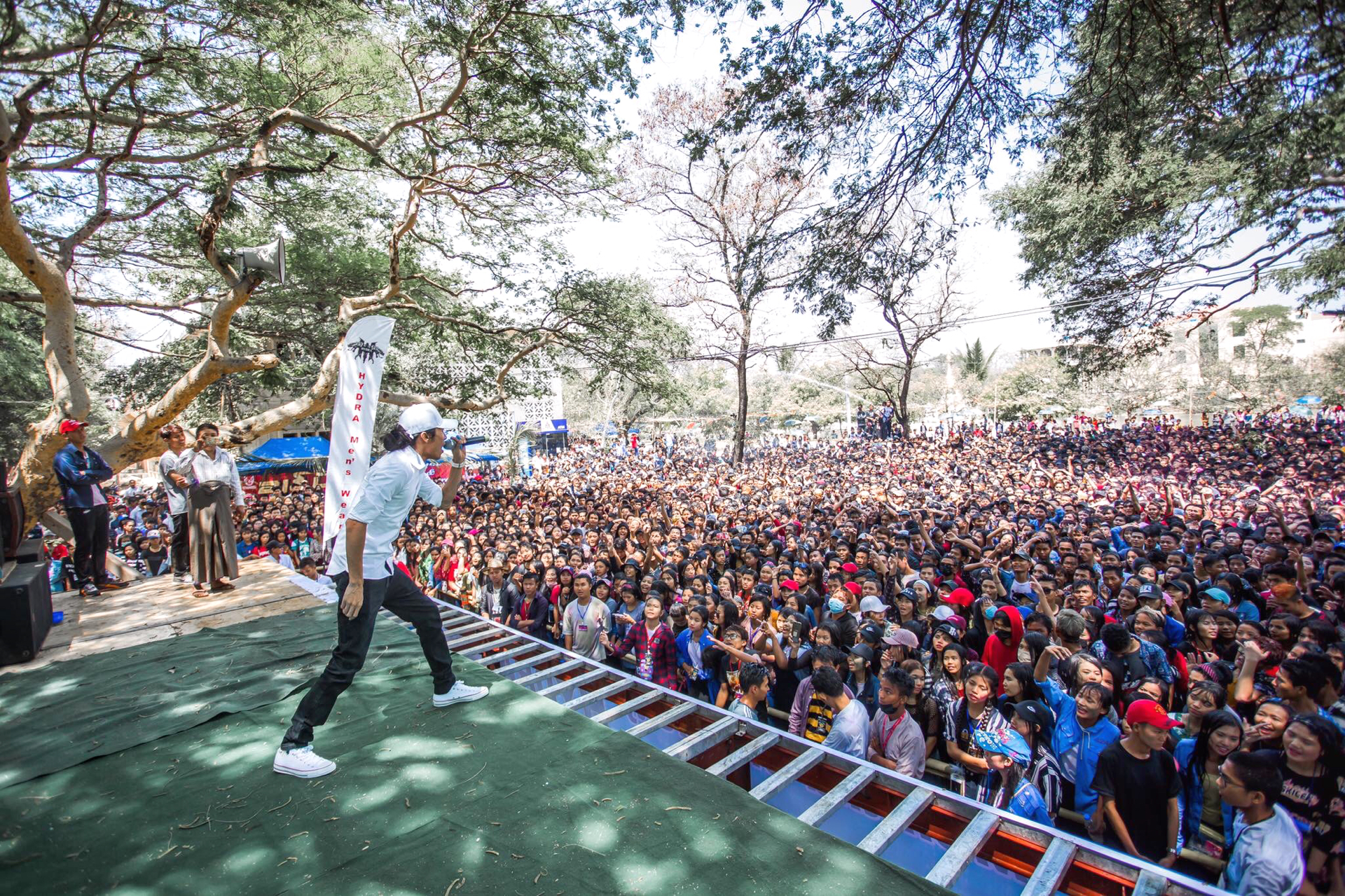
Y-Zet is performing in a concert

Y-Zet started his mainstream movement in 2014. And then he released an album "Pyaw San Par" (Just say it) which was a duo album with singer Oasix in 2015 December. One of the songs from that album, "Yote Thay Yote" (The Puppet) song gained him nationwide recognition and since then, that song has been one of the all-time hits in his career.

=== 2017–present: Solo debut and other activities ===
In early 2017, Y-Zet started endeavoring to be able to produce and distribute his first solo album. He launched his debut solo album "Za" (Gene) on 10 June 2017 which spawned more huge hits. Many music industry records have followed since then.

In 2018, Y-Zet released two single songs with featured artists, Wyne Lay and NJ.

== Death issue in his concert ==
On June 10, 2017, Y-Zet held a concert for his solo album promotion in Mandalay that was, unsurprisingly, attended by thousands of people, most of whom were teenagers.

During the concert, several fights broke out over the course of the night. Ultimately, the event was shut down for security reasons, but not before one fight in particular got so out of hand that it ended in the death of one 19-year-old attendee.

== Discography ==
=== Duet mix-tapes ===
- The Collaboration (2010)

=== Solo mix-tapes ===
- My Mistake (2013)

=== Duo albums ===
- Pyaw San Par (Just say it) (2015)

=== Solo album ===
- Za (Gene) (2017)
