= May Thet Khine =

Burmese actress, model and singer (born 1989)

- မေသက်ခိုင်
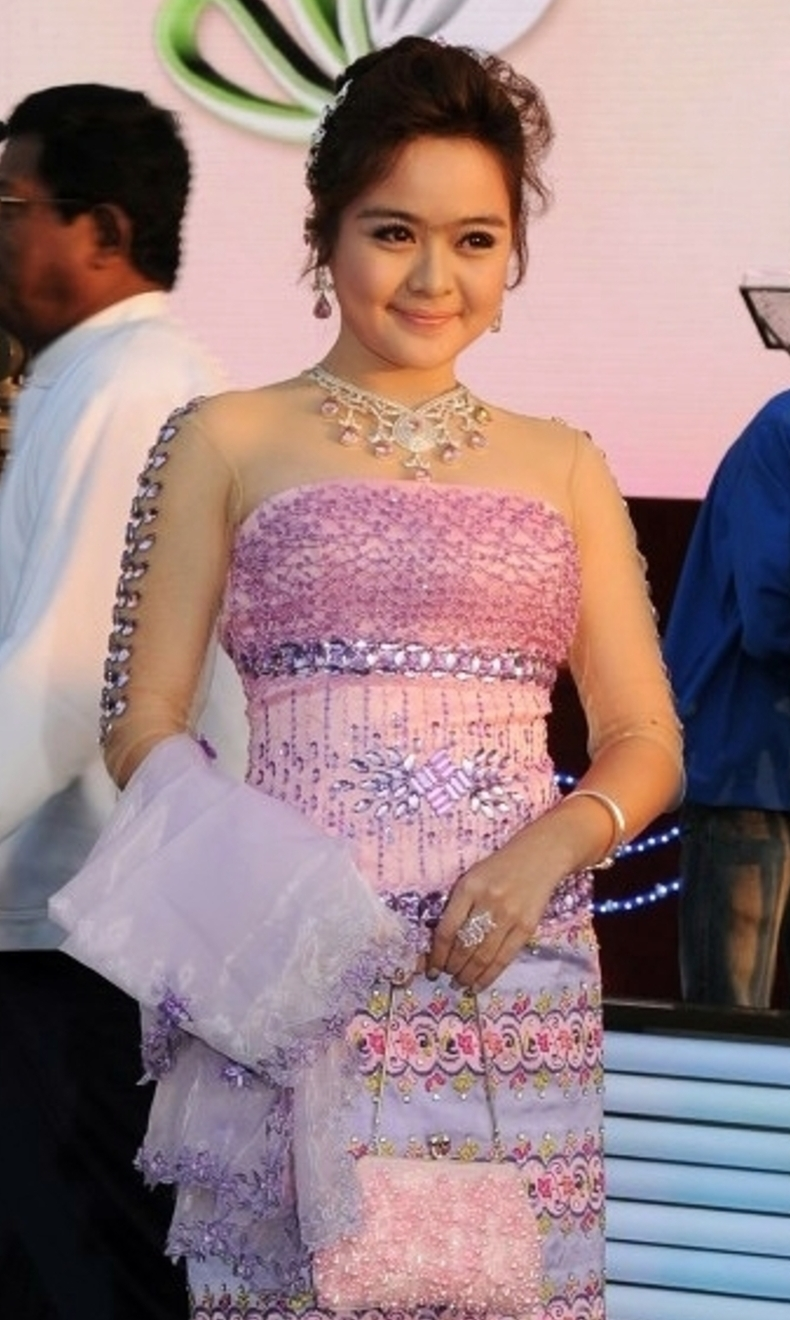
- May Thet Khine at the Myanmar Academy Awards Ceremony
- Born: 24 September 1989 (age 36); Yangon, Myanmar
- Education: Yangon University of Economics
- Occupations: Actress, model, singer
- Years active: 2007–2013; 2017
- Height: 5 ft 4 in (1.63 m)
- Parent: Moe Moe Yee

May Thet Khine (Burmese: မေသက်ခိုင်; born 24 September 1989) is a Burmese actress, model and singer who was one of the most popular actresses around 2000s. Throughout her career, she has acted in over 200 films.

== Early life and education ==
May Thet Khine was born on 24 September 1989 in Yangon, Myanmar to parents Tint Lwin and his wife Moe Moe Yee. She is the only daughter and niece of actress May Thinzar Oo. She attended high school at Basic Education High School No. 2 Latha. She enrolled at Yangon University of Economics, and then she dropout of university at the first year.

== Career ==
=== 2005–2006: Beginnings ===
May Thet Khine started acting when she was four years old thanks to her aunt May Thinzar Oo, whose acting her reportedly hopes to emulate. She has no formal training in acting; however she says her aunt and director Wyne, have taught her a lot. In 2006, she appeared on local magazine cover photos, and as commercial model for many advertisements. Her hard work as a model and acting in commercials was noticed by the film industry and soon, film casting offers came rolling in.

=== 2007–2012: Acting debut, recognition and retirement ===
She officially entered the film industry in 2007 and acted in music videos. She earned the notice of the audience when she starred in the music video for the song "Moe" by singer Ye Lay. Then came the offers for TV commercials and then DVD ones. Her hardwork as a model and acting in commercials was noticed by the film industry and soon, film casting offers came rolling in. She made her acting debut with a leading role in the film Kyan Taw Ama Ma Kyar Nyo (My Sister Ma Kyar Nyo), alongside Tun Tun, Wyne Su Khaing Thein and Nawarat in 2007. She then starred in the film Ho Lu Gyi, where she played the leading role for a first time with actor Dwe. The film was a domestic hit, and led to increased recognition for May Thet Khine.

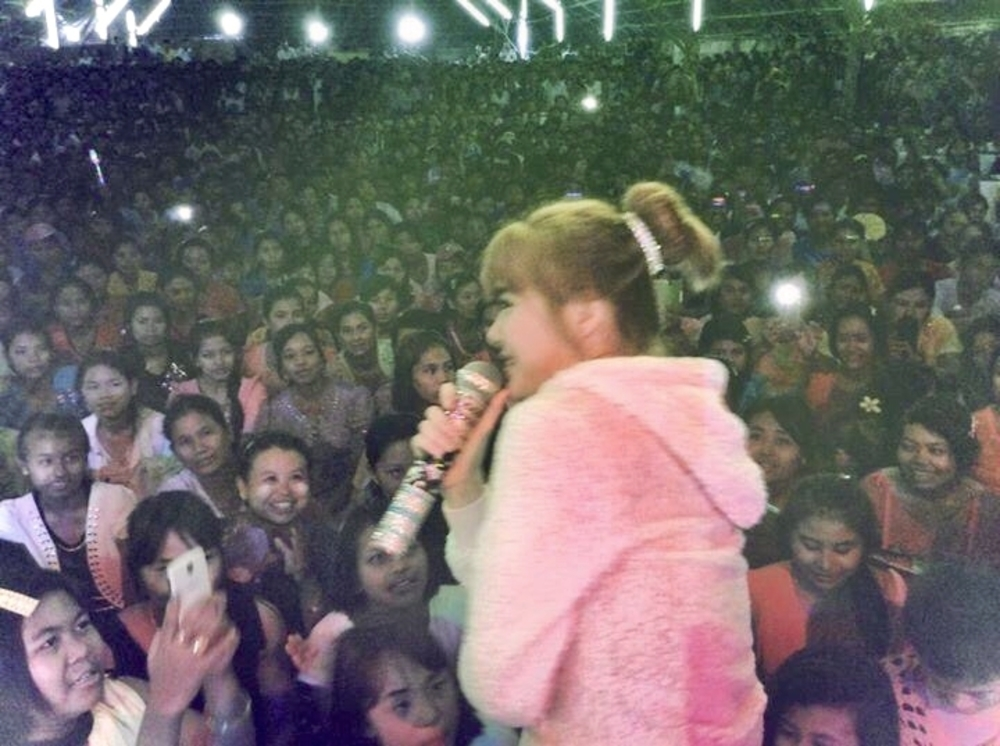
May Thet Khine is performing in a concert

In 2008, she took on her first big-screen role in the film Dhamma Thawka Innwa Yarzar, alongside Lu Min which screened in Myanmar cinema in 2009. She then starred in her second big-screen film Amone Mee Tauk (The Flames of Hatred), where she played the leading role with Hein Wai Yan, Swan and Khant Si Thu, which screened in Myanmar cinema in 2012. The film was nominated in the shortlist of seven films for Myanmar Academy Awards 2012. She completely disappeared from the screens for four years when she was busy with her business.

=== 2017–present: Return to screen ===
In 2017, May returned to the film industry with a starring role in the military television film Pyi Daung Zu Thitsar. The film, which was based on the Battle of Mongkoe, was directed by Tin Aung Soe (Pann Myo Taw), aired on Myawaddy TV on 27 March 2017 to commemorate the 72nd Myanmar Armed Forces Day, and theatrically screened on 27 March 2018.

== Selected filmography ==
=== Film ===
- Dhamma Thawka Innwa Yarzar (ဓမ္မသောကအင်းဝရာဇာ) (2009)
- The Flame Of Hatred (အမုန်းမီးတောက်) (2009)
- Union Loyalty (ပြည်ထောင်စုသစ္စာ) (television film, 2017)

Year	Film	Co-Stars	Note
2007	Kyan Taw Ama Ma Kyar Nyo	Htun Htun, Wyne Su Khaing Thein, Nawarat	
2007	Ho Lu Gyi	Dwe	
2007	Nway Ayate	Aung Ye Lin, Myint Myat, Yan Aung	
2007	Mitta Lon Pwe	Swan Zarni, Nay San, Myat Kay Thi Aung	
2007	May May Thate Khar	Htike Tan, Soe Moe Kyi	
2007	Yin Twin Myitta	Maung, Soe Myat Thuzar	
2008	A Seain Yint Yaung Dannayi	Kyaw Kyaw Bo	
2008	A Htar Nat Yin Myat Tal	Tet Nay, Dane Daung, Khin Hlaing	
2008	Arr Lone Achit No. 1	Si Phyo, Ye Aung	
2008	Myint Mo Ei At Kyoung	Hein Wai Yan, Na Wa Rat, Zin Wine	
2009	Sue Kyoe Khat Tae Aden Oo Yin	Kyi Zaw Htet, Min Oo	
2009	Myint Sone Dannayi	M Lan Bawm, Min Oo	
2009	Nay Tayar Moe Ta Pyay	Min Oo, Wine Min Lu	
