= Guest (2019 film) =

2019 Burmese drama film

- Burmese: ဧည့်သည်
- Directed by: Nyunt Myanmar Nyi Nyi Aung
- Written by: Moe Ni Lwin
- Starring: Shwe Htoo; Shwe Hmone Yati; Nay Chi Oo
- Music by: Shwe Htoo
- Production company: 7th Sense Film Production
- Release date: May 30, 2019
- Running time: 120 minutes
- Country: Myanmar
- Language: Burmese

Guest (Burmese: ဧည့်သည်, romanized: Ae Thal) is a 2019 Burmese drama film starring Shwe Htoo, Shwe Hmone Yati and Nay Chi Oo. The film, produced by 7th Sense Film Production and premiered in Myanmar on May 30, 2019.

== Cast ==
- Shwe Htoo as Nay La
- Shwe Hmone Yati as Myu Moe
- Nay Chi Oo as Hnin Nu
- Phyo Ngwe Soe as U Myat Min Naing
