= Nann Thuzar =

Burmese singer-songwriter, composer and model

- နန်သူဇာ
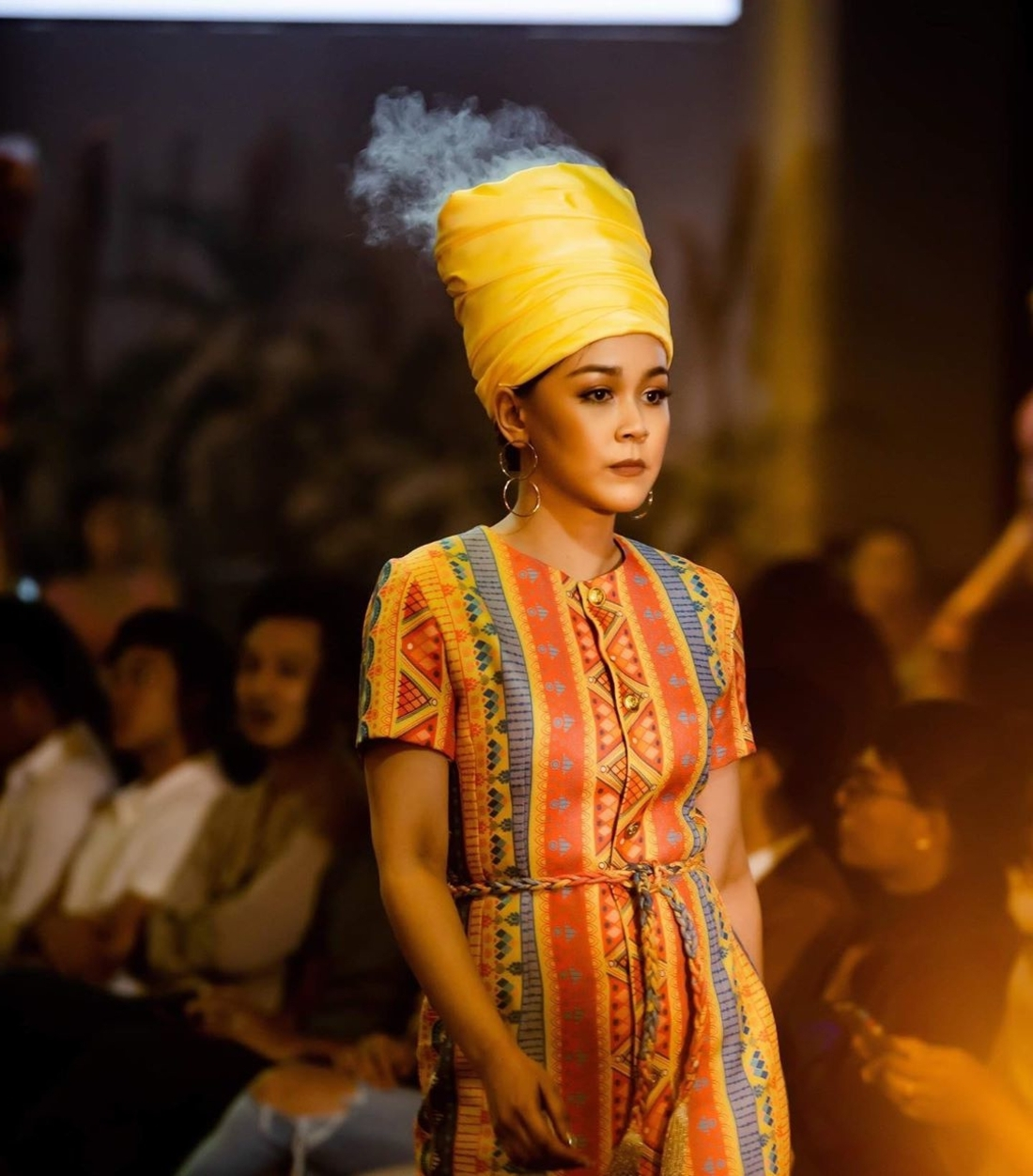
- Nann Thuzar walking the runway at the 2018 Myanmar International Fashion Week.
- Born: Nann Thuzar; 1 December 1990 (age 35); Yangon, Myanmar
- Education: Dagon University
- Occupations: Model, singer-songwriter
- Partner: Kyaw Htut Swe
- Musical career
- Genres: Hip hop, R&B
- Instruments: Vocals
- Years active: 2009–present

Nann Thuzar (Burmese: နန်းသူဇာ; also spelled Nan Thuzar, born 1 December 1990) is a Burmese singer-songwriter, composer and model who has achieved fame and success as a model and singer. Nann Thuzar rose to fame with her album "Friends" which was a duo album with Nan Myat Phyo Thin. In 2017, she started walking the runway at the Myanmar International Fashion Week every year.

== Early life and education ==
Nann Thuzar was born on 1 December 1990 in Yangon, Myanmar. She is the eldest daughter and has a younger brother. She went to Basic Education High School No. 2 Kamayut (St.Augustine) and graduated from Dagon University with a degree in English.

== Career ==
She started modelling in 2009 after winning the Step Fashion Girl 2009. Then, she appeared on the cover of local magazines. She has appeared as a commercial model in over 30 commercial advertisements, including Doaru, Gold Roast, and Sunday Coffee, etc. Afterwards, she entered the music industry. She has become popular due to the "Lar Yar Lan Lay" song included in the group album "Shwe FM 3rd Anniversary". Since then, she gained her first recognition from her fans. On 6 October 2013, she released an album "Friends" which was a duo album with Nan Myat Phyo Thin. The album was a commercial success reaching the top of the album charts. The video album was released on 25 January 2015.

Nann Thuzar has been presenting and acting in the popular travel documentary called Let's Go together with other artists, Hlwan Paing, Kyaw Htut Swe, Bunny Phyoe, Nan Myat Phyo Thin, and Bobby Soxer.

On 12 February 2016, she performed in the traditional anyeint Mandalar May as a comedian. She also performed in the major anyeint concert Khit Thit Akari on 9 September 2016. The anyeint has been highly criticized for making some jokes.

== Political activities ==
Following the 2021 Myanmar coup d'état, she participated in the anti-coup movement both in person at rallies and through social media. Denouncing the military coup, she took part in protests, starting in February. She joined the "We Want Justice" three-finger salute movement. The movement was launched on social media, and many celebrities joined the movement.

On 14 April 2021, warrants for her arrest were issued under Section 505 (a) of the penal code by the State Administration Council for speaking out against the military coup. Along with several other celebrities, she was charged with calling for participation in the Civil Disobedience Movement (CDM) and damaging the state's ability to govern, supporting the Committee Representing Pyidaungsu Hluttaw, and generally inciting the people to disturb the peace and stability of the nation.

== Television program ==
- Let's Go (2013–16)
- Let's Go to Europe (2016)

=== Anyeint ===
- Myanmar-Thailand Friendship Concert (2014)
- Mandalar May (မန္တလာမေ) (2016)
- Khit Thit Akari (ခေတ်သစ်ဧကရီ) (2016)

== Discography ==
=== Duo albums ===
- Friends (2013)

=== Group albums ===
- Yat Kwat Htae Ka Ayuu (ရပ်ကွက်ထဲကအရူး)
- Shwe FM 3rd Anniversary Album
- Shwe FM 6th Anniversary Album
- Bo Bo 5th Anniversary Album
- Bo Bo Music Thingyan Album
