= Mhaw Kyauk Sar =

2018 Burmese romantic drama film

- Film poster
- Burmese: မှော်ကျောက်စာ
- Directed by: Win Htun Htun
- Written by: Inngyin Han; Myint Oo Oo Myint
- Based on: Magical Inscription by Khu Khu
- Produced by: Htun Nay Soe
- Starring: Myint Myat; Shwe Hmone Yati; Htun Htun; Thu Htoo San; Phyo Ngwe Soe; May Myint Mo
- Production company: Myanmar Media 7 Film Production
- Release date: October 5, 2018
- Running time: 120 minutes
- Country: Myanmar
- Language: Burmese

Mhaw Kyauk Sar (Burmese: မှော်ကျောက်စာ), is a 2018 Burmese historical romantic drama film starring Myint Myat, Shwe Hmone Yati, Htun Htun, Thu Htoo San, Phyo Ngwe Soe and May Myint Mo. The film, produced by Myanmar Media 7 Film Production and premiered in Myanmar on October 5, 2018.

== Cast ==
- Myint Myat as Rakarway (Prince), Di Thaung
- Shwe Hmone Yati as Par Di May, Josh
- Htun Htun as Wutta Kyaw (Commander-in-Chief)
- Thu Htoo San as Wasaysaya (King)
- Phyo Ngwe Soe as Thettaka (Wizard)
- May Myint Mo as Hariman (Princess)
- May Than Nu
