= Anubis (2016 film) =

2016 Burmese film

- Film poster
- Burmese: အနူးဘစ်
- Directed by: Lu Min
- Screenplay by: Min Khite Soe San; Htet Myat Naing Zin
- Story by: Min Min Hlaing
- Starring: Lu Min; Nay Toe; Wutt Hmone Shwe Yi; Shwe Hmone Yati
- Production company: Aung Tine Kyaw Film Production
- Release date: September 9, 2016 (Myanmar)
- Running time: 118 minutes
- Country: Myanmar
- Language: Burmese

Anubis (Burmese: အနူးဘစ်) is a 2016 Burmese mysterious horror film, directed by Lu Min starring Lu Min, Nay Toe, Wutt Hmone Shwe Yi and Shwe Hmone Yati. It is about the ancient god of Egypt, the Anubis and Car Racing. The film, produced by Aung Tine Kyaw Film Production premiered in Myanmar on September 9, 2016.

== Cast ==
- Lu Min as Than Lwin Htut Khaung
- Nay Toe as La Pyae Kyaw
- Wutt Hmone Shwe Yi as Selene
- Shwe Hmone Yati as Than Lwin Akari
