= Journey to the Death =

2019 Burmese film

Kyauk Kyauk Kyauk 2: Journey to the Death
- Official Film Poster
- Burmese: ကြောက်ကြောက်ကြောက်၂
- Directed by: Aww Ratha
- Screenplay by: Nay Soe Thaw; Lwin Min Eant
- Story by: Nyein Chan Kyaw
- Starring: Nay Toe; Nan Su Oo; Htun Htun; May Myint Mo; Tyron Bejay; Joker; Pyae Pyae
- Cinematography: Mano V. Narayanan
- Production company: 7th Sense Film Production
- Release date: December 26, 2019
- Running time: 120 minutes
- Country: Myanmar
- Language: Burmese

Kyauk Kyauk Kyauk 2: Journey to the Death (Burmese: ကြောက်ကြောက်ကြောက်၂) is a 2019 Burmese horror comedy film, directed by Aww Ratha starring Nay Toe, Nan Su Oo, Htun Htun, May Myint Mo, Tyron Bejay, Joker and Pyae Pyae. This is the sequel movie of Kyauk Kyauk Kyauk And Second Installment Of film series. The film, produced by 7th Sense Film Production premiered in Myanmar on December 26, 2019.

== Cast ==
- Nay Toe as That Ti
- Nan Su Oo as Kalyar
- Tun Tun Examplez as Min Aung
- May Myint Mo as Pont Pont
- Tyron Bejay as Tyron
- Joker as Bala
- Pyae Pyae as Pyae Pyae
