= Si Phyo =

Burmese actor

- စည်ဖြိုး
- Born: Si Phyo Htun; September 4, 1990 (age 35); Pathein, Myanmar
- Occupation: Actor
- Years active: 2012–present
- Parent(s): Htun Aung (father); Thi Thi Win (mother)
- Relatives: Pyae Phyo Aung (brother)

Si Phyo (Burmese: စည်ဖြိုး; born Si Phyo Htun 4 September 1990) is a Burmese actor. He is best known for his leading roles in several Burmese films. Throughout his career, he has acted in over 200 films.

== Early life ==
Si Phyo was born on September 4, 1990, in Pathein, Ayeyarwady Region, Myanmar to parent Htun Aung and Thi Thi Win. He is the eldest of two siblings. His brother's name is Pyae Phyo Aung. Si Phyo is also the nephew of astrologer Daw Swe Swe Win (ET).

== Career ==
In 2012, he started his career by starring in his debut film Ywar Pyuk Gyi alongside Wyne Su Khine Thein. In the same year, he starred in film Chit Thu Eain alongside Soe Pyae Thazin and May Thet Khine. An then he acted in many film with different actresses.

In 2018, he starred in big screen film Killing Field alongside Min Thway, Nay Ye and Htoo Char. In 2019, he starred in big screen Lay Par Kyawt Shein Warazain alongside Min Maw Kun, Htun Htun, Nay Min, Min Thway, Paing Phyo Thu, Shwe Thamee and Than Thar Moe Theint. The same year, he starred in action-drama series A Lin Htae Ka Lu alongside Mone and San Toe Naing.

== Business ==
- Happy Pages – Snack & Stationery
- Boombox Recording Studio
- Rasta Myanmar
- Mae Sot Taste Authentic Thai Food
- E Thi Gems and Jewels

== Filmography ==
=== Film ===
List of movie
Year	English title	Co-star
2012	Ywar Pyauk Gyi	Wyne Su Khine Thein
2012	Chit Thu Eain	Soe Pyae Thazin, May Thet Khine
2012	Ganawin Thonya	May Kabyar
2012	Yin Kwae Nat Khat	Thinzar Nwe Win
2012	Gwa Kya Tae Gwin	Khin Hlaing, Dain Daung
2013	Radio	May Kabyar, Khin Hlaing
2013	Lay Nar A Yat Ka A Chit	Min Oo, Moht Moht Myint Aung, Pearl Win, Nan Su Yati Soe
2013	Lwan Sate Thint Say	Thinzar Wint Kyaw
2014	That Pone Mhar Tae A Chit	Chit Thu Wai
2014	Small Swae Thu Myar	Min Oo, May Than Nu, Nan Myat Phyo Thin
2016	Mahar Gaw Li	Wyne Su Khine Thein
	Phoe Si Phyo	Khin Hlaing, May Pan Chi
	Ka Yay Kyway Tae Moe	Chit Thu Wai
	A Chit Tho Ma Hote Kwai	Thar Nyi, Paing Phyo Thu
	Thonya That Ka Yit Zero Nate Ban	May Thet Khine, Baby Maung

=== Film (Cinema) ===
List of film
Year	English title	Director	Co-star
2018	Killing Field	Thar Nyi	Min Thway, Nay Ye, Htoo Char
2019	Lay Par Kyawt Shein Warazain	Thar Nyi	Min Maw Kun, Htun Htun, Nay Min, Min Thway, Paing Phyo Thu, Shwe Thamee, Than Thar Moe Theint
2019	Responsible Citizen	Steel (Dwe Myittar)	Min Maw Kun, Htun Htun, Nay Ye, Min Thway, Shwe Thamee

=== Television series ===
List of TV series
Year	English title	Network	No. of Ep	Co-star
2019	A Lin Htae Ka Lu	MRTV-4	30	San Toe Naing, Mone
2019	Love at 7–11	WeTV (Thailand)	8	All cast from Thailand
