= The Dark Cinema =

2019 Burmese horror film

- Film poster
- Burmese: မဟူရာရုပ်ရှင်ရုံ
- Directed by: Pyae Zaw Phyo
- Written by: Pyae Zaw Phyo
- Produced by: Wai Min Maung
- Starring: Nay Toe; Kyaw Kyaw Bo; Min Thway; Riya Ray; Nan Su Oo
- Edited by: Arkar Kyaw
- Music by: Creative Mahar Sound Studio
- Production company: 7th Sense Film Production
- Release date: April 25, 2019
- Running time: 120 minutes
- Country: Myanmar
- Language: Burmese

The Dark Cinema (Burmese: မဟူရာရုပ်ရှင်ရုံ, romanized: Mahuyar Yote Shin Yone) is a 2019 Burmese horror film starring Nay Toe, Kyaw Kyaw Bo, Min Thway, Riya Ray and Nan Su Oo. The film, produced by 7th Sense Film Production premiered in Myanmar on April 25, 2019.

== Cast ==
- Nay Toe as Nyan Lin Aung
- Kyaw Kyaw Bo as Ye Thiha
- Min Thway as Kyaw Swar
- Riya Ray as Riya
- Nan Su Oo as Yati
