= My Rowdy Angel =

2018 Burmese film

- Film Poster
- Burmese: ကိုယ်စောင့်နတ်
- Directed by: Win Lwin Htet
- Screenplay by: Win Lwin Htet
- Starring: Hlwan Paing; Khin Wint Wah; Yan Aung; Kyaw Thu; Htun Htun; Htoo Aung; Yell Htwe Aung; Thu Ta Aung; Khaing Thazin Ngu Wah
- Production company: Media 7 Film Production
- Release date: December 28, 2018
- Running time: 120 minutes
- Country: Myanmar
- Language: Burmese

My Rowdy Angel (Burmese: ကိုယ်စောင့်နတ်) is a 2018 Burmese romantic-comedy film, directed by Win Lwin Htet starring Hlwan Paing, Khin Wint Wah, Yan Aung, Kyaw Thu, Htun Htun, Htoo Aung, Yell Htwe Aung, Thu Ta Aung and Khaing Thazin Ngu Wah. The film, produced by Media 7 Film Production premiered Myanmar on December 28, 2018.

== Cast ==
=== Main cast ===
- Hlwan Paing as David
- Khin Wint Wah as Bella
- Yan Aung as Sports coach of school
- Kyaw Thu as Owner of arena
- Tun Tun Examplez as Rowdy Angel
- Htoo Aung as Bala Gyi
- Yell Htwe Aung as Ye Htway
- Thu Ta Aung as Thu Ta
- Khaing Thazin Ngu Wah as Ngu Wah
- Kin Kaung as School bus driver

=== Guest cast ===
- Thinzar Wint Kyaw
- Khay Sett Thwin
- Su Lin Shein
