= Bobby Soxer (singer) =

Burmese Singer

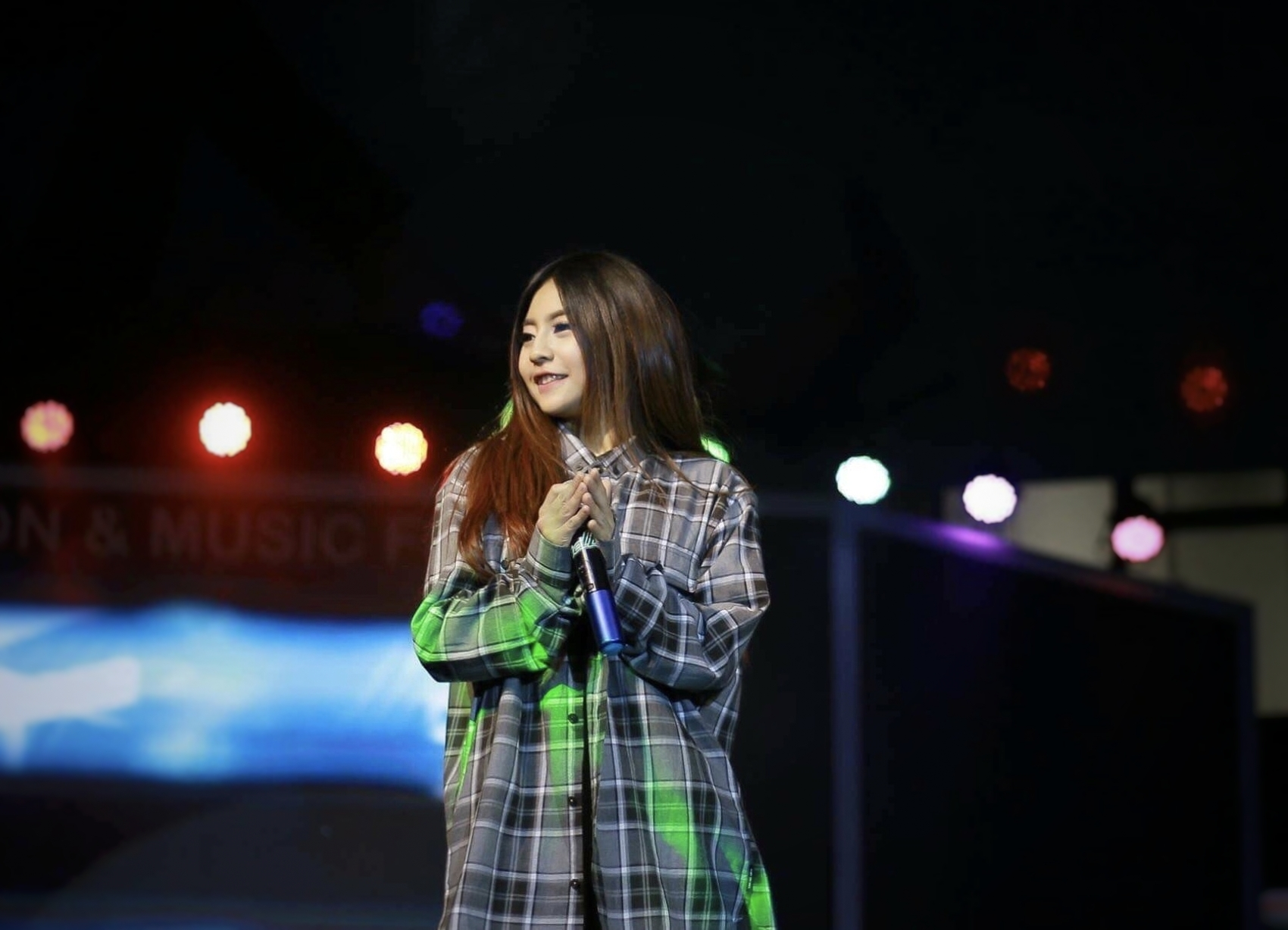
- Bobby Soxer performing at a concert

Background information
- Born: Htet Htet Aung; 22 May 1993 (age 33); Yangon, Myanmar
- Genre: Hip hop
- Occupations: Singer-songwriter, rapper, actress
- Instrument: Vocals
- Years active: 2006–present

Bobby Soxer, also known as Htet Htet (Burmese: ထက်ထက်, born Htet Htet Aung; 22 May 1993), is a Burmese singer, songwriter, and actress. She is considered one of the pioneering female hip-hop vocalists in Myanmar and has earned the title of "Myanmar's Hip Hop Queen."

== Early life and education ==
Bobby Soxer was born on 22 May 1993 in Yangon, Myanmar to parents Aung Zaw Lin, a trader, and his wife Moe Theingi. She is the youngest daughter of two siblings, having an older brother, Soe Lin Phyo, a model. She attended high school at Basic Education High School No. 1 Dagon and graduated from the National Management College, Myanmar.

== Music career ==
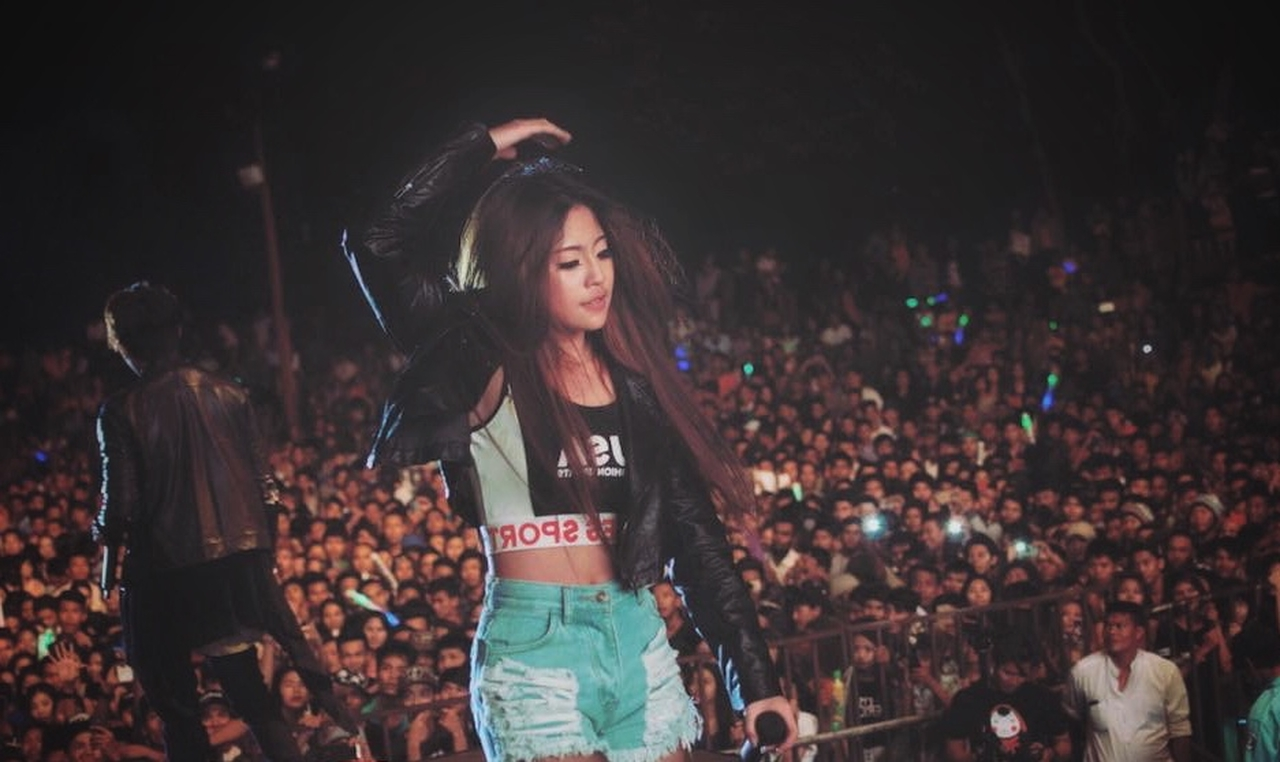
Bobby Soxer performs in a concert at the Myawsinkyun, Yangon

Bobby began her music journey in 2006, releasing underground hip-hop tracks before achieving her breakthrough. She garnered recognition at the age of 13 for her collaboration with R&B singer Ye Lay on the track "Do Not Want To Say Good Bye". However, it was her hit song "Pwe" that catapulted her to fame in the music industry, earning her initial recognition from her fans.

Bobby released the album "Done Pyan" (Rocket) in collaboration with her partner Hlwan Paing on November 21, 2011. This album garnered the "Best Music Album Award" from both Shwe FM and City FM. Additionally, they generously donated 1 million Myanmar kyats from the proceeds of a gold prize earned for the Rocket album to support orphan children through the Thu Kha Yike Myone charity organization. Since the release of this duet album, Bobby has participated in shooting commercial advertisements, stage performances, and numerous concerts across Myanmar. Simultaneously, she collaborated on numerous songs with Hlwan Paing and artists from the Rock$tar group.

Bobby collaborated with Hlwan Paing and Eaint Chit on the song "Ko Ko", which went on to win the "Best Music Award" at the Shwe FM Awards. Bobby collaborated with hip-hop artist Sai Sai Kham Leng and Coca-Cola Myanmar to release a song for the 2014 FIFA World Cup campaign titled "The World is Ours".

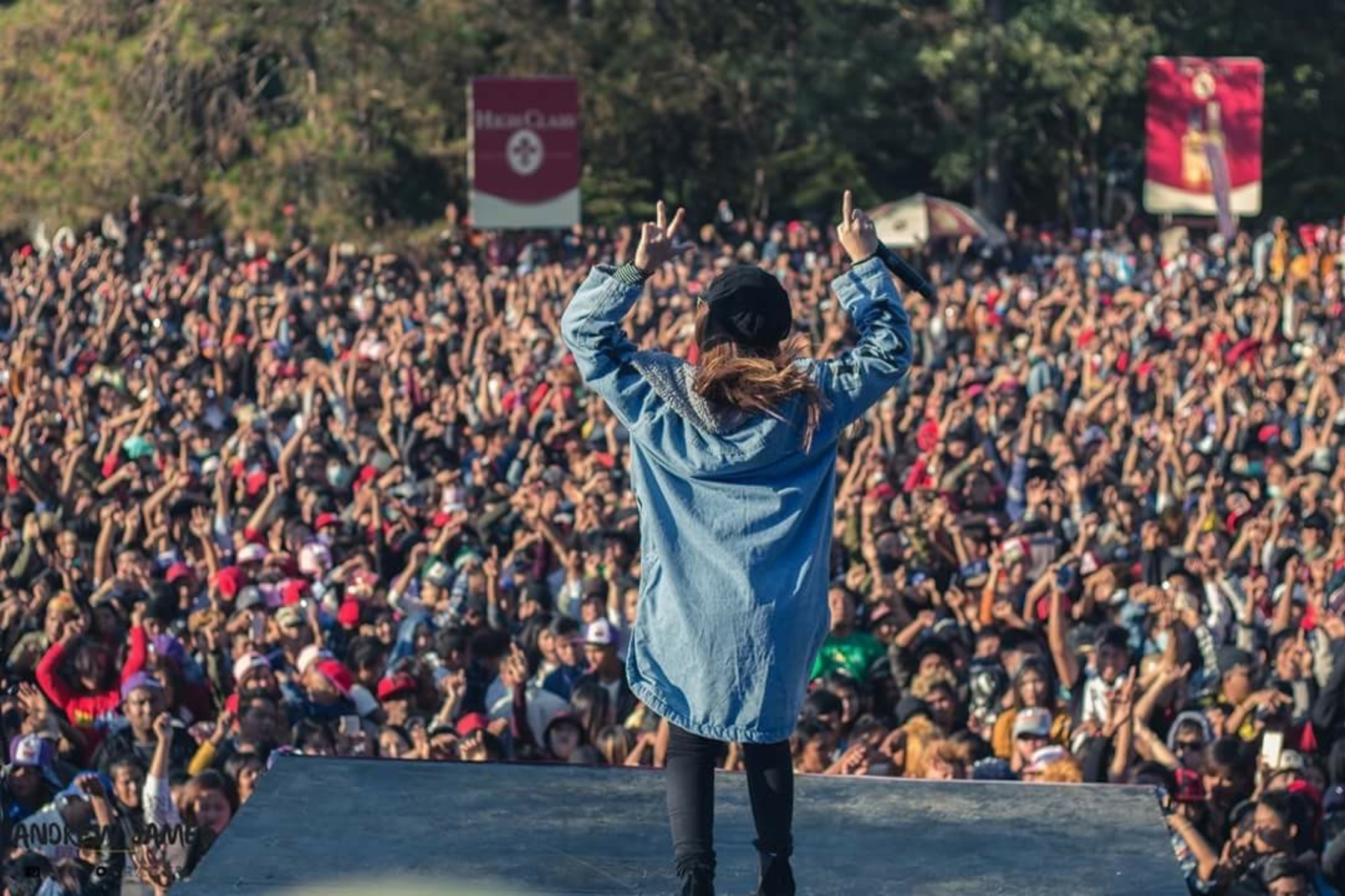
Bobby Soxer is performing in a concert at the Pyin Oo Lwin Flower Festival in 2018

Bobby started endeavoring to be able to produce and distribute a solo album. She launched her debut solo album "#21" on 8 February 2015. The follow-up video album was released in July 2015. Bobby embarked on a journey to produce and distribute her solo album, culminating in the release of her debut solo album "#21" on February 8, 2015. Following this success, the follow-up video album was released in July 2015. Bobby is widely regarded as one of the most commercially successful Burmese female singers and has earned the title of "Myanmar's Hip Hop Queen".

== Acting career ==
Bobby Soxer has been involved in presenting and acting in a travel documentary series titled Let's Go, alongside other artists such as Hlwan Paing, Bunny Phyoe, Kyaw Htut Swe, Nann Thuzar, and Nan Myat Phyo Thin. She made her acting debut with a leading role in the 2015 film Ar Shwee Tae Ko Ko, where she starred alongside Lu Min.

== Brand Ambassadorships ==
Bobby Soxer was appointed as a brand ambassador of Coca-Cola on 26 July 2013, and she participated in Open Happiness marketing campaign which is distributing new style of Coca-Cola bottles. She was also brand ambassador of Samsung Mobile Myanmar, SPY Wine Cooler and Ve Ve.

== Filmography ==
=== Film ===
- Ar Shwee Tae Ko Ko (အာရွှီးတဲ့ကိုကို) (2015)

== Discography ==
=== Solo albums ===
- #21 (2015)

=== Duo albums ===
- Done Pyan (ဒုံးပျံ) (2011)

== Personal life ==
Bobby Soxer is in a relationship with Burmese hip hop singer Hlwan Paing since 2009. However, she declared on Facebook at the end of 2022 that their relationship had come to an end. The long-term relationship allegedly ended after Hlwan Paing became involved with actress Naw Phaw Eh Htar. The scandal sparked intense online backlash, prompting Hlwan Paing to later admit to the affair. In response to the controversy, Bobby Soxer released a song titled "Amyi Tat Pe Pyaw Paing Kwint Mashi" (နာမည်တပ်ပြီးပြောပိုင်ခွင့်မရှိ; lit. "No Right to Speak Without Naming Names"), which indirectly blamed Naw Phaw Eh Htar for the breakup of her 13-year relationship with Hlwan Paing.
