= Kyauk Kyauk Kyauk =

2017 Burmese film

- Official Film Poster
- Burmese: ကြောက်ကြောက်ကြောက်
- Directed by: Aww Ratha
- Screenplay by: Yazawin Ko
- Story by: Yazawin Ko
- Starring: Nay Toe; Khin Wint Wah; Htun Htun; Nan Myat Phyo Thin; Min Thway; Nang Khin Zay Yar; Kyaw Kyaw; Po Po (singer)
- Cinematography: Nay Toe
- Production company: 7th Sense Film Production
- Release date: August 4, 2017
- Running time: 120 minutes
- Country: Myanmar
- Language: Burmese

Kyauk Kyauk Kyauk (Burmese: ကြောက်ကြောက်ကြောက်) is a 2017 Burmese horror comedy film, directed by Aww Ratha starring Nay Toe, Khin Wint Wah, Htun Htun, Nan Myat Phyo Thin, Min Thway, Nang Khin Zay Yar, Kyaw Kyaw and Po Po (singer). The film, produced by 7th Sense Film Production premiered in Myanmar on August 4, 2017.

== Cast ==
- Nay Toe as Phoe Than Lone, Phoe Ar Luu
- Khin Wint Wah as Thar Yar
- Htun Htun as Min Nyo
- Nan Myat Phyo Thin as Ta Mar
- Min Thway as Khit Kaung
- Nang Khin Zay Yar as Seint San
- Kyaw Kyaw as Kyaw Kyar
- Po Po (singer) as Mal Madi

== See also ==
- Kyauk Kyauk Kyauk 2
