= Nay Chi Oo =

Burmese artist and businesswoman

- နေခြည်ဦး
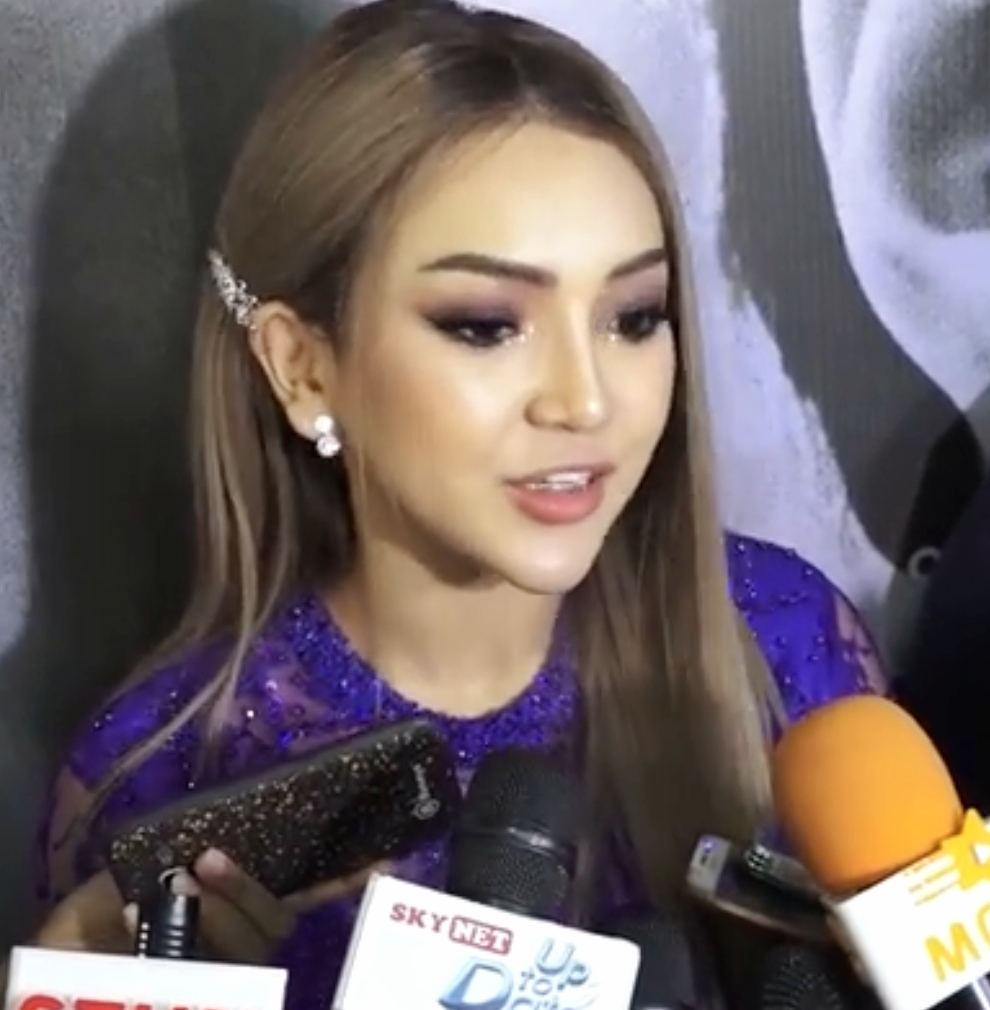
- Nay Chi Oo in 2018
- Born: Htoo Pyae Sone Myint; 25 January 1992 (age 34); Yangon, Myanmar
- Other name: Chi Chi
- Education: Cambridge Tutors College; University of Bradford
- Occupations: Beauty blogger, model, actress, businesswoman
- Years active: 2017–present
- Height: 5 ft 6 in (1.68 m)
- Spouse: Kyaw Swar Hein
- Parent(s): Zaw Min Tun; Than Than Swe

Nay Chi Oo (Burmese: နေခြည်ဦး; born Htoo Pyae Sone Myint on 25 January 1992) is a Burmese beauty blogger, actress, model and businesswoman. She is best known for her makeup tutorial videos and her beauty blog, "beautybynaychi" on Facebook. In 2019, Nay Chi Oo was recognized for her blogging by being featured on The Myanmar Times' "Top 10 Bloggers" list.

== Early life and education ==
Nay Chi Oo was born on 25 January 1992 in Yangon, Myanmar into a military family. She is the eldest daughter of Myo Myint Sein, a former military official, and his wife Than Than Swe, a botanist. Nay Chi Oo has a younger sister, Sein Lae Yadanar, and a younger brother. She attended high school at Practising School Yangon Institute of Education and graduated with GCE Advanced Level from Cambridge Tutors College in 2013, and MSc Forensic Medical Sciences from University of Bradford. While still in university, she served as Student president of Cambridge Tutors College. She studied MBA at Global MBA University of the Thai Chamber of Commerce.

== Career ==
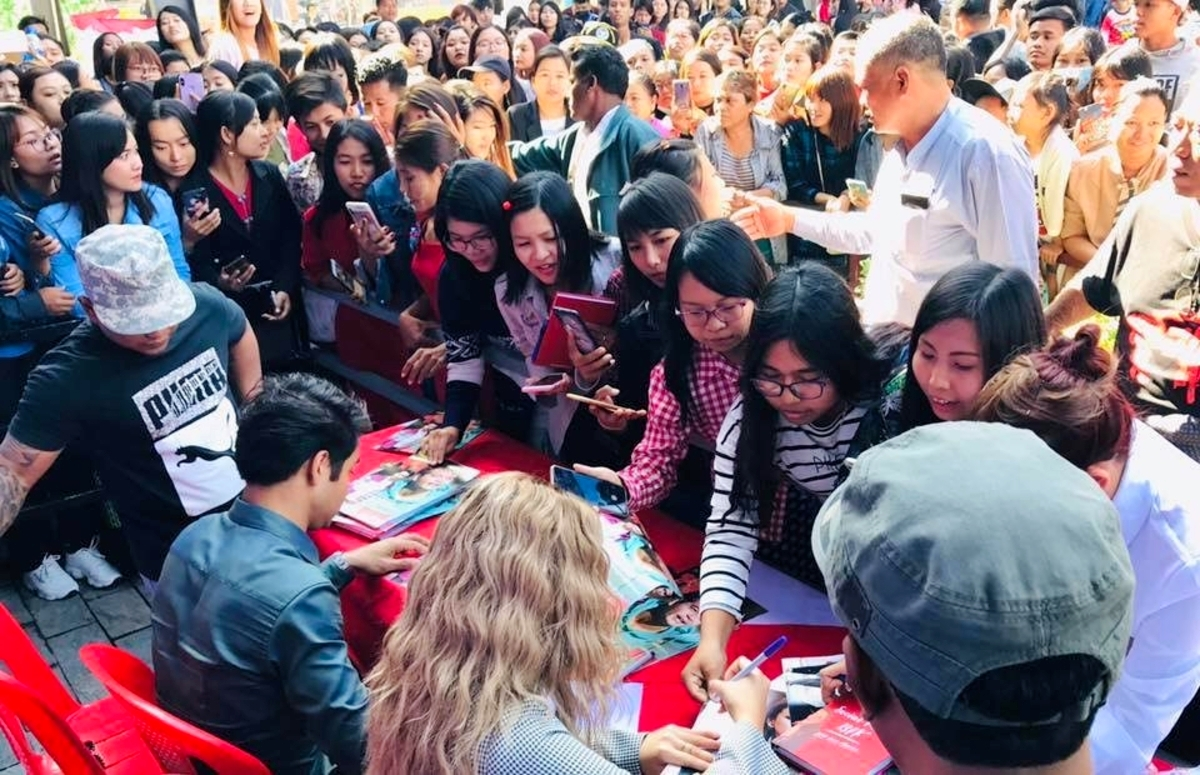
Nay Chi Oo and actor Nay Min at the signing event of Yan Thu film

Nay Chi Oo is using the popular social networking website Facebook for her beauty blogger career. In February 2017, she began posting make-up tutorials on Facebook under the page name beautybynaychi. She regularly posts make-up tutorials, make-up first impressions, beauty tips, and product reviews. At the end of the year, she became one of the most popular beauty bloggers in Myanmar.

Nay Chi Oo participated as a judge in Make me Beautiful by L'Oréal, a reality make-up contest TV show on selected make-up artists in Myanmar, and also in New Face Actor Choice contest of Kha Thone Lone film production in 2018.

Emerging into the spotlight in 2018, she ventured into acting by making her debut in the feature film Yan Thu (Rivals). Starring alongside Nay Min and Wutt Hmone Shwe Yi, her performance as Lay Pyay Nu Thway garnered critical praise, boosting her popularity.

In 2019, she starred in her second big-screen Ae The (The Guest). She then starred as the female lead in the drama Puyi Tha alongside Tyron Bejay, Cham Min Ye Htut and Khine Thin Kyi.

== Brand ambassadorships ==
On 15 February 2019, she was appointed as a brand ambassador for the Vivo smartphone. That was her first time working as a brand ambassador. On 28 February 2019, she was appointed as a brand ambassador for Air KBZ.

== Business ==
Her family possesses numerous businesses in Myanmar, including Sane Let Tin, one of the country's largest resorts situated in Kyaikto, which is also linked by Burmese military. She holds the position of co-founder at Sane Let Tin.

On 15 November 2018, she launched Your Social Media BFF 2019 year planner book under her own band, Beautybynaychilabel.

== Political criticism ==
In the aftermath of the 2021 Myanmar coup d'état, Nay Chi Oo stayed silent for the first few weeks after the coup, only responding after her fans requested her to do so. When she did join the protests, it was with an entourage of bodyguards. She became the subject of social boycotts and a social punishment movement due to her association with a high-ranking military family. She tried to donate to a Civil Disobedience Movement Support charity, and the donation was refunded to her, with the organization saying they didn't want her money. A number of business brands that have collaborated with Nay Chi Oo have announced the end of their partnership.

Nay Chi Oo shared her perspective on the military coup as someone who grew up in a military family after facing criticism on social media. She expressed, “I come from a military family background. However, I condemn anyone who supports this state rebellion against the will of the people".

On 30 March 2021, she was blacklisted by Myanmar Bloggers Community.

== Filmography ==
=== Film (Cinema) ===
- Yan Thu (ရန်သူ) (2018)
- The Guest (ဧည့်သည်) (2019)
- Puyi Tha (ပုရိသ) (2019)
- Ko Pwar (ကိုယ်ပွား) (2023)

=== Television series ===
Year	English title	Myanmar title	Role	Network	Notes
2020	House with the Dream	အိမ်မက်တွေမိုးထားတဲ့အိမ်	Nay Chi	MNTV	
