= Oasix =

Oasix အိုအေစစ်
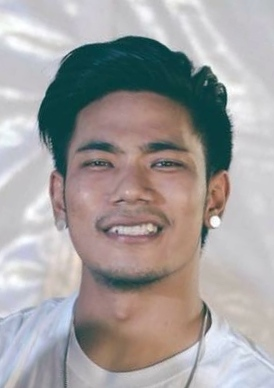
- Oasix (2018)

Background information
- Born: Thet Ko Tun; 18 December 1992 (age 33); Mandalay, Myanmar
- Genres: Hip hop
- Occupations: Singer-songwriter, rapper
- Instrument: Vocals
- Years active: 2009–present

Oasix (Burmese: အိုအေစစ်; born 18 December 1992) is a Burmese hip hop singer, songwriter and rapper. He is best known for his hip hop music and rose to fame with his debut album Pyaw San Par (Just say it) which was a duo album with singer Y-Zet.

== Early life and education ==
Oasix was born on 18 December 1992 in Mandalay, Myanmar. His father Tun Wai, was a former judge of Mandalay District court. He is the third son of four siblings, having two older brothers and a younger brother. He graduated the high school from Basic Education High School (14) Mandalay and then he enrolled in the English majoring at Yadarnabon University.

== Career ==
=== 2009–2013: Career beginnings in underground ===
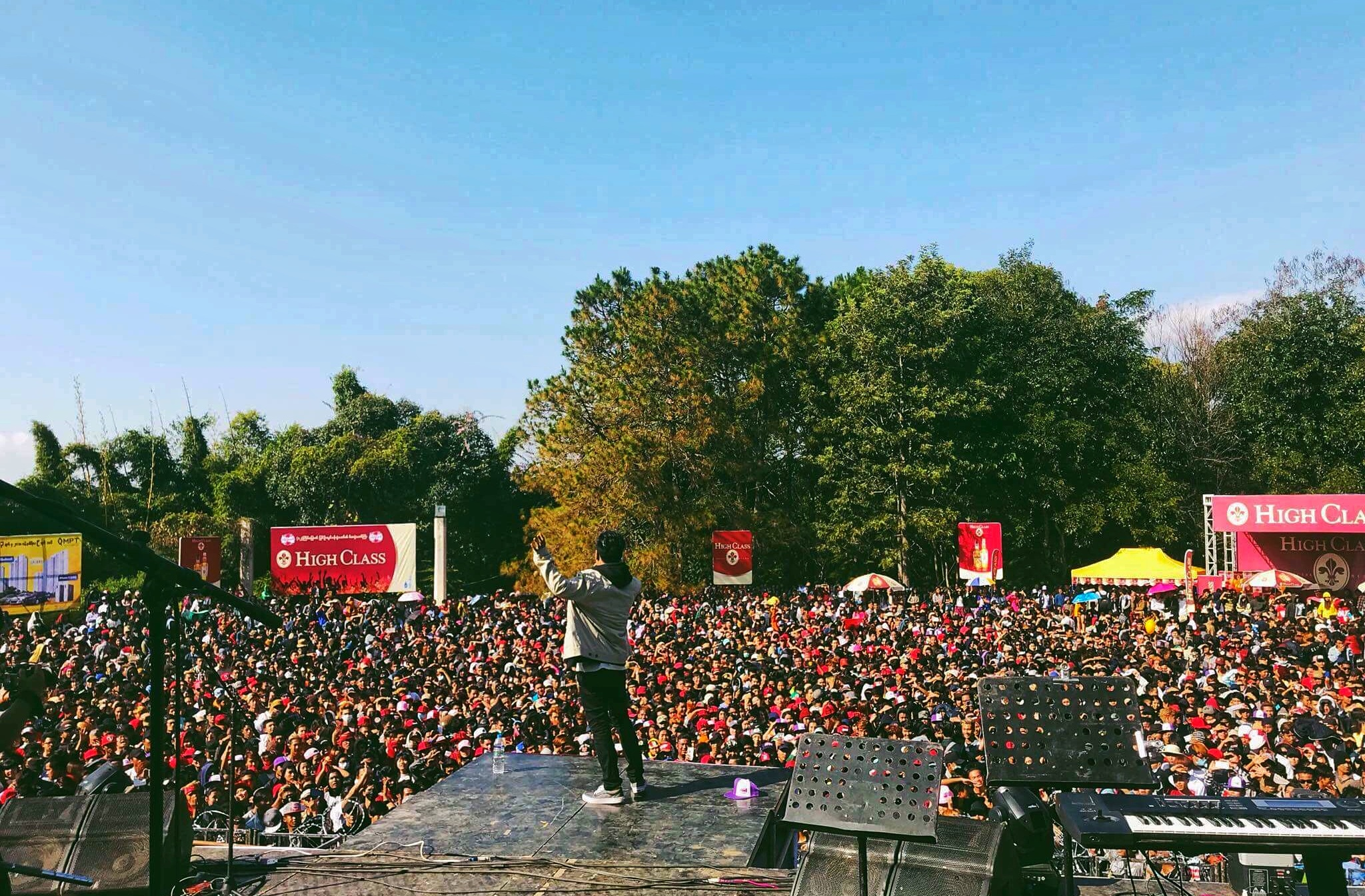
Oasix is performing for Pyin Oo Lwin Flower Festival in 2017

Oasix started out on his music career in 2009, as a member of the native underground hip hop crew “Wildboy” while he was still a university student. He released a lot of songs and mix-tapes, collaborating with Wildboy's members. In 2011, he released his solo mix-tape "The First", and his second solo mix-tape "The Running" was released in 2013. The Wildboy group was disbanded in the some year.

=== 2014–2018: Reached the mainstream and nationwide recognition ===
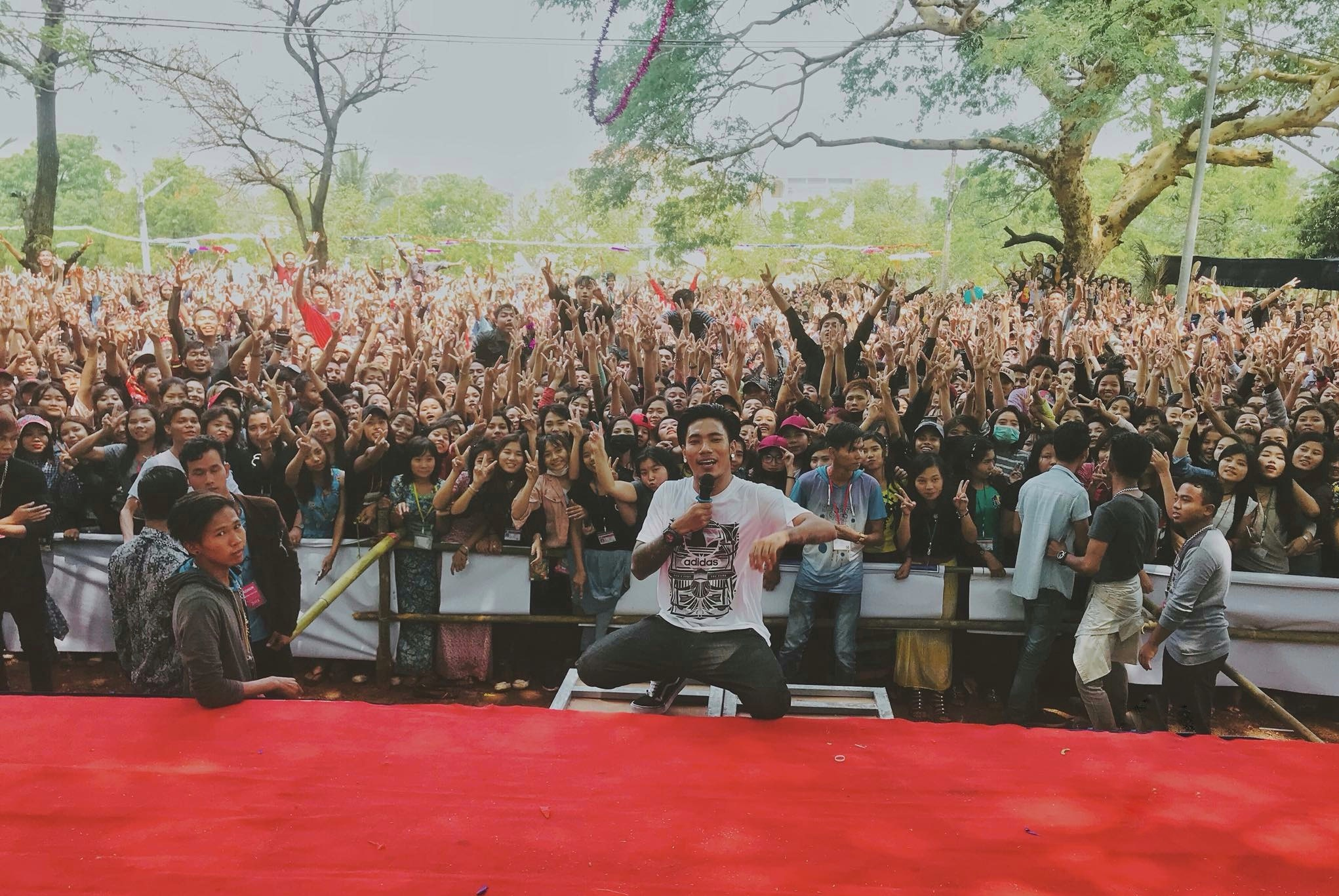
Oasix is performing in a concert together with his fans

Oasix started his mainstream movement in 2014. And then he released an album "Pyaw San Par" (Just say it) which was a duo album with singer Y-Zet on 24 December 2015.

He gained nationwide recognition in music industry with numerous hit songs including "Nin", "Bal Thu Ko Chit Lae", "Kal Thu Mae A Lin", and "A Chit Pyaing Pwal". Since he released the songs, he gained the first recognition from his fans and engaged in shooting commercial advertisements, stage performances, and many concerts at various locations throughout Myanmar.

In 2018, he started endeavoring to be able to produce and distribute a solo album. His solo album "1992" will drop in December 2018.

== Discography ==
=== Solo mix-tapes ===
- The First (2011)
- The Running (2013)

=== Duet albums ===
- Pyaw San Par (Just say it) (ပြောစမ်းပါ) (2015)

=== Solo albums ===
- 1992 (2018)
