= Shwe Hmone Yati =

Burmese actress and model

- ရွှေမှုံရတီ
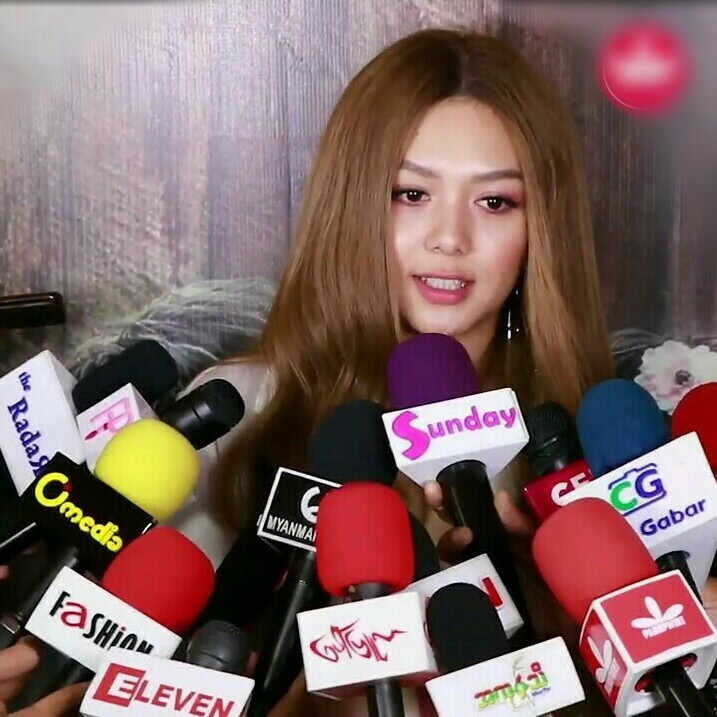
- Shwe Hmone Yati in 2019
- Born: 16 May 1998 (age 28); Yangon, Myanmar
- Other name: Thel
- Education: Ended High School
- Occupations: Model; Actress; Singer
- Years active: 2010–present
- Height: 5 ft 7 in (170 cm)
- Spouse: Shwe Htoo (m. 2018)
- Parents: Sein Thaung (father); Maw Maw Khine (mother)
- Relatives: Ngwe Hmone Yati (sister)
- Awards: Myanmar Motion Picture Academy Award for Best Actress (2022)

Shwe Hmone Yati (Burmese: ရွှေမှုံရတီ; born 16 May 1998) is an academy-winning Burmese actress. She is best known for her leading roles in several Burmese films.

== Early life ==
Shwe Hmone Yati was born on 16 May 1998, in Yangon, Myanmar to parents; Sein Thaung and Maw Maw Khine. She has a younger sister, named Ngwe Hmone Yati. She attended at BEHS 2 Kamayut.

== Career ==
Her career started from learning in Model Institute and Acting School. In 2012, at the age of 14, she starred her debut film Tha Khin Ye Kyay Kyun alongside Lu Min. In the same year, she starred her second film Aetta A Sate alongside Nay Toe and Palae Win and she became popular among the audiences from Myanmar. And then she acted in many film with different actors.

In 2017, she starred in Big screen Cho Myain Thaw Let Sar Chay Chin alongside Sai Sai Kham Leng and Khin Wint Wah. In the same year, she starred in Big screen Wit Nyin Ka Kyoe alongside Aung Ye Lin and Thinzar Wint Kyaw. In 2018, she starred in Big screen movie Mhaw Kyauk Sar alongside Myint Myat. In 2019, she starred in Big screen movie Guest alongside Shwe Htoo and Nay Chi Oo. In 2020, she starred in Big screen movie Mite Mae Chit alongside Myint Myat and Khin Wint Wah.

== Brand ambassadorship ==
She has been working as brand ambassador of Clear Myanmar since 1 January 2018. She has also been working as brand ambassador of Huawei Mobile Myanmar since 1 May 2019.

== Filmography ==
=== Film (Cinema) ===
- Aung Myin, Kyaw Kyar, Sue Sha, Htet Myet (အောင်မြင် ၊ ကျော်ကြား ၊ စူးရှ ၊ ထက်မြက်) ( 2012 )
- A Chit Sit (အချစ်စစ်) ( 2016 )
- Ban Daw Kyet Thu Khoe ( ဘန္တောကြက်သူခိုး ) ( 2016 )
- Anubis (အနူးဘစ်) ( 2016 )
- Mhaw Kyauk Sar ( မှော်ကျောက်စာ ) ( 2016 )
- Cho Myain Thaw Let Sar Chay Chin (ချိုမြိန်သောလက်စားချေခြင်း) ( 2017 )
- Wit Nyin Ka Kyoe (ဝိညာဉ်ကကြိုး) ( 2017 )
- Mar Yar Style (မာယာစတိုင်) ( 2017 )
- ငါ့အကယ်ဒမီ ( 2017 )
- Hee Hee Ha Ha (ဟီးဟီးဟားဟား) ( 2018 )
- Nge Kyun (ငယ်ကျွန်) ( 2018 )
- Pyone Shwin Yay Pyaw Yae Lar (ပြုံးရွှင်ရေပျော်ရဲ့လား) (2019)
- The Milk Ogre (နို့ဘီလူး) (2019)
- Guest (ဧည့်သည်) (2019)
- Thit Sar Nan Taw (သစ္စာနန်းတော်) (2019)
- Kye Kye Kyal Kyal (ကြီးကြီးကျယ်ကျယ်) (2019)
- Mite Mae Chit (မိုက်မဲချစ်) (2020)
- Rose Castle (နှင်းဆီရဲတိုက်) (2020)
- စိတ်ကြီးဝင်နေတဲ့မိန်းမ ( 2023 )
- သဲသဲလှုပ် ( 2023 )
- Kan (ကမ်း) ( 2024 )
- Oxygen ( 2024 )
- သူနိုင်ကိုယ်နိုင် ( 2024 )

=== Television series ===
- Chit Chin Ko Phan Sin Thu ( 2017 )
- Lwan Lo Ma Kyan Yit Say Lo ( 2023 )
- Myet Kwal Yar ( 2025 )

== Personal life ==
She is married to Shwe Htoo in 2018.
