= Shwe Htoo =

Burmese singer

Shwe Htoo ရွှေထူး
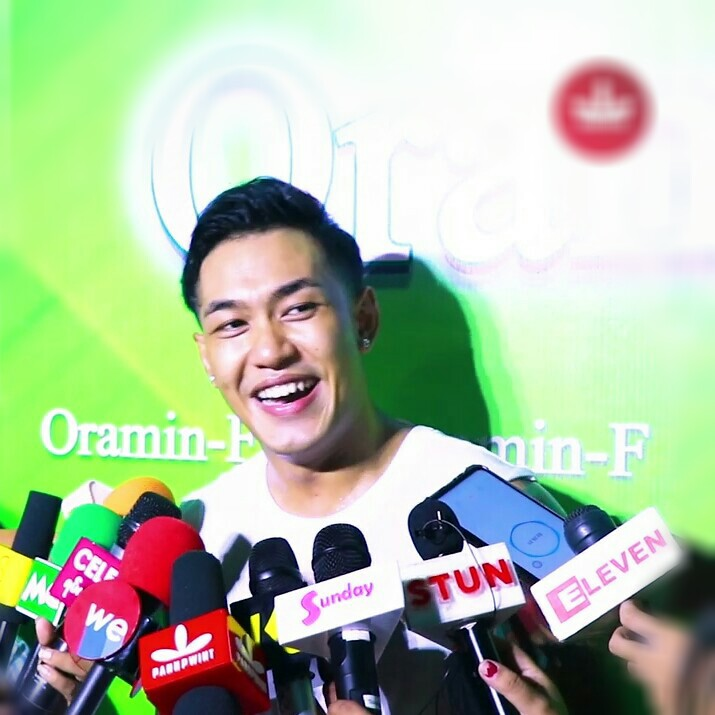
- Shwe Htoo In 2019

Background information
- Born: Htoo Khant; 19 September 1990 (age 35); Yangon, Myanmar
- Genres: Pop; R&B; Hip Hop
- Occupations: Singer-songwriter; Actor; Producer
- Instruments: Vocals; guitar
- Years active: 2011–present

Shwe Htoo (Burmese: ရွှေထူး; born Htoo Khant 19 September 1992), is a Burmese singer-songwriter and actor. His first solo album The Imagination Book was released in 2015.

== Early life and education ==
Shwe Htoo was born on 19 September 1992 in Yangon, Myanmar. He attended at BEHS 2 Kamayut (St.Augustine).

== Music career ==
He began his music career by singing love songs and uploading his songs on internet. He has become popular due to his songs. In 2014, his debut album Four was released alongside Htet Yan, X Boxin and Lil Z. His second album The Imagination Book was released in 2015. In 2018, his third album I was released. In 2019, his single song "A Mone Pin" was popular among the audiences. In 2020, his single song "Ma Cele Thar 1 Le" was popular among audiences and celebrities on TikTok. Almost all of his songs were peaked at number one on Myanmar Top Chart on Joox.

== Brand ambassador ship ==
He has been worked as a brand ambassador for Ve Ve Beverages Myanmar.

== Discography ==
=== Album ===
- Four (2014)
- ‌တောသားသွေးနဲ့ ဘောကြားဆေးမယ် (2025)
- The Imagination Book (စိတ်ကူးယဉ်စာအုပ်) (2015)
- I (2018)

=== Single ===
- Barmeton (2017)
- Don't Leave Me Alone (2017)
- A Marr (အမှား) with Shwe Hmone Yati (2018)
- A Mone Pin (အမုန်းပင်) (2019)
- Ma Cele Thar 1 Le (မဆယ်လီသားတစ်လီ) with Timmy (2020)
- Moe Sat Myar Ka Pyaw Thaw (မိုးစက်များကပြောသော) with Shwe Hmone Yati (2020)

== Filmography ==
=== Film (Cinema) ===
- Pat Pat Sat Sat Nhyoe (ပက်ပက်စက်စက်ညှို့) (2017)
- Guest (ဧည့်သည်) (2019)
- Legend of the Rain (ဒဏ္ဍာရီမိုး) (2019)
- Kan (ကမ်း) (2020)

== Awards ==
- Male Singer Award of Most Requested Song for 2016 (Shwe FM 7th Anniversary)
- Male Singer Award of Best Selling Studio Album Award for 2016 (City FM 15th Anniversary)
- Male Singer Award of Most Requested Song Award for 2018 (City FM 17th Anniversary)
- Joox Top 10 Artists Award for 2019
- Best Supporting Actor (Myanmar Motion Picture Academy Awards for 2019)

== Personal life ==
He is married to Shwe Hmone Yati in 2018.
