= Lun Htar Htar =

Burmese writer and physician

- လွန်းထားထား
- Born: Htar Htar Lin; 8 June 1971 (age 55); Rangoon, Burma
- Education: MBBS
- Alma mater: University of Medicine 1, Yangon
- Spouse: Unt Tun Maung
- Children: May Maung
- Writing career
- Language: Burmese
- Genres: Fiction, Romance

Lun Htar Htar (Burmese: လွန်းထားထား) is a prolific Burmese writer and physician having written over 300 novels throughout her career.

Lun Htar Htar was born on 8 June 1971 in Rangoon, Burma to parents Soe Thway and Mya Yi. Her birth name is Htar Htar Lin (ထားထားလင်း). She matriculated from Basic Education High School No. 2 Dagon in 1987, earning distinctions in 4 subjects on the national matriculation exam. She pursued further studies at University of Medicine 1, Yangon, graduating with an MBBS degree in 1998. She is married to a British physician, Unt Tun Maung, and a daughter, May Maung. She currently resides in England.

== Works ==
- မချစ်ရဲပါဘူးနော် (1990)
- အကြင်နာသူစိမ်း (1991)
- အတူတူရှိလှည့်ပါ (1991)
- မခွဲထာဝစဉ် (1991)
- မြတ်နိုးမိသည်မှအပ (1991)
- ဆုံစည်းဖို့ရာ (1992)
- ခွဲခဲ့ရသော် (1992)
- ချစ်မြတ်နိုးလွန်းသူ၏နှလုံးသား (1992)
- သက်ဆုံးတိုင် (1993)
- သမုဒယကင်း (1993)
- အကြွေပန်း၏နိဒါန်း (1993)
- ပဲ့ကြွေသွားသောနှလုံးသားတစ်ခု၏တမ်းချင်း (1993)
- ငြိုးမာန်ဖွဲ့ စိမ်းရက်လေသလား (1993)
