= Hlwan Paing =

Burmese singer

- လွှမ်းပိုင်
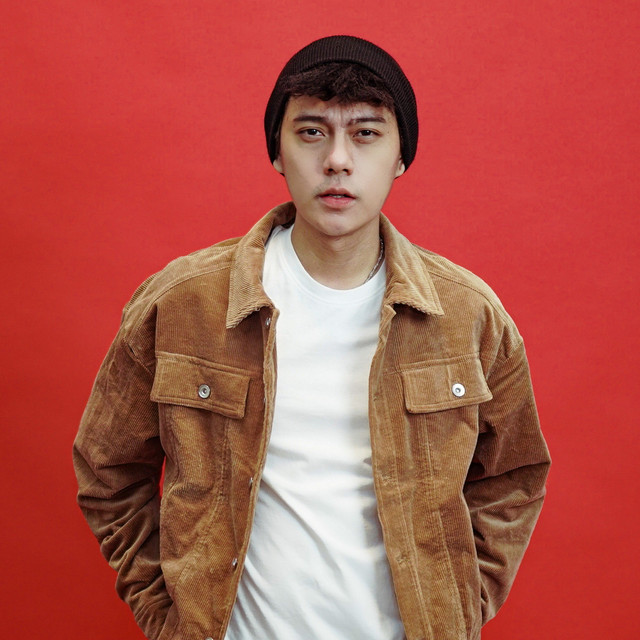
- Born: Hlwan Paing; 1 March 1989 (age 37); Taunggyi, Myanmar
- Other names: MC Hlwan Paing, Bo Paing Gyi
- Education: Technological University, Thanlyin
- Occupations: Singer-songwriter; rapper; actor; gaming streamer
- Height: 5 ft 7 in (1.70 m)
- Relatives: Kyaw Hsu (brother)
- Musical career
- Genres: Hip hop
- Instruments: Vocals
- Years active: 2005–present

Hlwan Paing (Burmese: လွှမ်းပိုင်; born 1 March 1989) is a Burmese singer-songwriter, composer, and actor. He is considered one of the most successful Burmese singers, and rose to fame with his debut album Done Pyan (Rocket), which was a duo album with Bobby Soxer. Hlwan Paing is also an active gaming streamer and started online streaming in 2018 by using his online alias Bo Paing Gyi.

== Early life and education ==
Hlwan Paing was born on 1 March 1989 in Taunggyi, Shan State, Myanmar. He is the youngest son of three siblings. His elder brother Kyaw Hsu is also an actor. He graduated from Technological University, Thanlyin.

== Music career ==
Hlwan Paing began his career as part of the underground group "89" while still in school, collaborating on songwriting and vocals. Subsequently, he was approached by Ah Boy, the leader of the Rock$tar group, and was invited to become the final member of Rock$tar. Since then, Hlwan Paing has begun collaborating with mainstream artists. Renowned for his distinctive approach to music creation, songwriting, and rap delivery, he became known as Myanmar's sole recognized twister, showcasing his unique flair for rapid-fire lyrical delivery.

In 2009, Hlwan Paing was selected as one of the highlighted artists for Ye Lay's track "Ma Nhoute Sat Chin Bu" (Do Not Want To Say Good Bye), featured on the album "Tat Ta Ya Kar Yan" (Third Rhyme), where he showcased his hip-hop rap skills. He catapulted to fame in the music scene with his smash hits "Done Pyan" and "Bo Kay," both featured on the "Done Pyan" album. Additionally, tracks like "Uptown Girl," linked with Yair Yint Aung, "A Girl of a Boy," associated with Bunny Phyoe, and "The Letter For Friend," released as a single, gained widespread popularity among teenage audiences.

On November 21, 2011, he released the collaborative album Done Pyan (Rocket) alongside his partner Bobby Soxer, which included songs like "Done Pyan" and "Bo Kay." Done Pyan received the prestigious "Best Music Album Award" from both Shwe FM and City FM. Hlwan Paing and Bobby Soxer donated 1 million Myanmar kyats from the proceeds of a gold prize to support orphan children through the Thu Kha Yike Myone charity organization. Hlwan Paing delved into commercial advertisements, stage performances, and concerts across Myanmar. He collaborated with Bobby Soxer and Eaint Chit on the song "Ko Ko," which went on to win the esteemed "Best Music Award" at the Shwe FM Music Award.

On June 8, 2014, Hlwan Paing unveiled his debut solo album titled "Gi Ta Sar So Hlwan Paing." Following this success, the follow-up video album was released on February 12, 2016. One of the tracks from that album, "Min Ye Kyaw Swar Bo Nay Toe," was subsequently adapted into a film.

He released his second solo album, "Gita Bay Da" on 24 June 2017.

On 13 October 2023, he released his third solo album, "Heart-break Anniversary", which received high credits among music fans. Especially the song "Chit Tine Lal Ma Nyar" has become a great hit. Previously it was thought to intended to his break-up with Bobby Soxer but later revealed his story with Naw Phaw Eh Htar, who has chosen "life" over "love" leaving him behind after she received devastating harassment from the public for her scandal with Hlwan Paing.

== Acting career ==
Hlwan Paing has been involved in presenting and acting in a travel documentary series titled Let's Go, alongside fellow artists such as Bunny Phyoe, Kyaw Htut Swe, Nann Thuzar, Nan Myat Phyo Thin, and Bobby Soxer.

Hlwan Paing made his acting debut by securing a leading role in the 2016 film Old Jacket, where he starred alongside Khin Wint Wah. Following Old Jacket, Hlwan Paing starred in his second film, 67 Plaza, alongside Kaew Korravee. The film was released in June 2018.

He made his big-screen debut in the 2018 Burmese film Kyway, where he starred alongside Ei Chaw Po and Tyron Bejay. The film, based on the novel Pyaw Tine Yone Tak Pote Thin Nyo by Min Lu, was directed by Thar Nyi.

He continued his acting career in the 2018 drama film Nga Ko Nann Tae Mone Tine (The Storm That Kissed Me), where he played the lead role alongside Phway Phway and Yair Yint Aung. Hlwan Paing's portrayal of the character garnered praise from fans, who commended his acting performance and interpretation, leading to a resurgence in his popularity.

In the same year, Hlwan Paing took on the male lead role in the film Ko Saung Nat, co-starring Khin Wint Wah and Htoo Aung. Directed by Win Lwin Htet, the film's screenplay was also written by Hlwan Paing himself.

His first drama series is "Yin Htal Ka Dan Der Ye or Legend in our hearts" written by Hlwan Paing himself and directed by Win Lwin Htet. It was broadcast on Channel K in June 2022 and considered as one of the most successful drama series due to his acting skills, strong romantic chemistry with Naw Paw, lovely storyline with emotional resonance, and the two memorable original song tracks. One is "Yin Htel Mhar" written by Hlwan Paing himself which received over 17 million views in his YouTube. Another is "Min Atwat Ngar" by Shine, which was originally in Rakkhine language but adapted into Burmese lyrics in this drama series.

== Brand Ambassadorships ==
Hlwan Paing was appointed as brand ambassador of Ve Ve on February 28, 2015, and also as brand ambassador of Vivo-Y55 smart phone in 2016.

== Personal life ==
Hlwan Paing had been in a relationship with hip-hop singer Bobby Soxer since 2009, but they officially announced their breakup in December 2022 after being together for 13 years. The long-term relationship allegedly ended after Hlwan Paing became involved with actress Naw Phaw Eh Htar. The scandal sparked intense online backlash, prompting Hlwan Paing to later admit to the affair. In response to the controversy, Bobby Soxer released a song titled "Amyi Tat Pe Pyaw Paing Kwint Mashi" (နာမည်တပ်ပြီးပြောပိုင်ခွင့်မရှိ; lit. "No Right to Speak Without Naming Names"), which indirectly blamed Naw Phaw Eh Htar for the breakup of her 13-year relationship with Hlwan Paing. After the breakup with Naw Phaw, Hlwan Paing entered into a relationship with actress Nan Su Yati Soe.

In August 2025, Hlwan Paing was heavily criticized for losing his temper with a journalist during an interview, after the journalist asked an inappropriate question and mocked his relationships with several celebrity women.

== Awards ==
Award	Year (Note: Indicates the year of ceremony. Each year is linked to the article about the awards held that year, wherever possible.)	Recipient(s) and nominee(s)	Category	Result	Ref.
City FM awards	2014	Hlwan Paing	"Most Popular Male Vocalist Award of Year"	Won	
City FM awards	2017	Gita Bay Da	"Best Selling Stereo Music Album Male Vocalist of the Year"	Won	
Shwe FM awards	2013	Done Pyan	"Best Selling Album of Year"	Won	
Shwe FM awards	2014	Gi Ta Sar So Hlwan Paing	"Best Selling Album of Year"	Won	
Myanmar Music Awards	2014	Ko Ko	"Best Rap Song of the Monsoon (Artist Choice Award)"	Won	
Myanmar Music Awards	2014	Ko Ko	"Freshest Rap Song of the Monsoon (People Choice Award)"	Won	
Myanmar Music Awards	2014	Ngar Doe Way	"Best MTV Award"	Won	

== Filmography ==
=== Film (Cinema) ===
- The Storm that Kissed Me (ငါ့ကိုနမ်းတဲ့မုန်တိုင်း) (2018)
- Kyway (ကြွေ) (2018)
- My Rowdy Angel (ကိုယ်စောင့်နတ်) (2018)
- Yat Kyaw Ywar Kyaw (ရပ်ကျော်ရွာကျော်) (2019)
- Ka Gyee Kha Khway (ကကြီး ခခွေး) (2023)

=== Film ===
- Old Jacket (ဂျာကင်ဟောင်းလေး) (2016)
- 67 Plaza (67 ပလာဇာ) (2018)
- Yat Kyaw Ywar Kyaw (ရပ်ကျော်ရွာကျော်) (TBA)

== Discography ==
=== Solo albums ===
- Gi Ta Sar So Hlwan Paing (ဂီတစာဆိုလွှမ်းပိုင်) (2014)
- Gita Bay Da (ဂီတဗေဒ) (2017)
- Hear-break Anniversary (2023)

=== Duo albums ===
- Done Pyan (ဒုံးပျံ) (2011)
