= Min Thway =

Burmese actor and singer

- မင်းသွေး
- Born: Nay Min Aung; 21 June 1986; Manaung, Rakhine State, Burma
- Died: 3 October 2018 (aged 32); Yangon, Myanmar
- Education: Dagon University
- Occupations: Actor, singer
- Years active: 2008–2018
- Partner: Kay Kay Soe
- Relatives: Nay Toe (brother)

Min Thway (Burmese: မင်းသွေး; born Nay Min Aung 21 June 1986 – 3 October 2018) was an Arakanese actor and singer. He is best known for his leading roles in several Burmese films. Throughout his career, he had acted in over 200 films.

He started his acting career in 2008.

== Early life and education ==
Min Thway was born on 21 June 1986 in Taw Hthu Village, Manaung, Rakhine State, Myanmar to parents U Aung Than and Daw Than Myaing. He was third son of four siblings. His elder brother Nay Toe is also an actor. He attended high school at BEHS Manaung in 2001. He graduated with a degree BSc (IC) from Dagon University in 2006.

== Death ==
He died at 33 years old on the way to the hospital on October 3, 2018. He fell unconscious and died shortly after returning to Myanmar from overseas. Doctors did not release his cause of death but people speculate that it resulted from exhaustion or a heart attack.

== Filmography ==
- Kyauk Kyauk Kyauk (2017)
- Clinging with Hate (2018) (premiered in cinemas after his death)
- Killing Field (2018) (premiered in cinemas after his death)
- Lay Par Kyawt Shein Warazain (2019) (premiered in cinemas after his death)
- The Dark Cinema (2019) (premiered in cinemas after his death)
- Responsible Citizen (2019) (premiered in cinemas after his death)
