= Yell Htwe Aung =

Burmese actor (1993–2018)

- ရဲထွေးအောင်
- Born: 7 April 1993; Yangon, Myanmar
- Died: 2 January 2018 (aged 24)
- Other names: Aung Ye Htwe
- Occupations: Comedian, actor
- Years active: 2015–2018

Yell Htwe Aung (Burmese: ရဲထွေးအောင်, also spelt Ye Htwe Aung; 7 April 1993 – 2 January 2018) was a Burmese internet comedian and actor who had posted dozens of sit-com style videos to Facebook and YouTube. He made his acting debut in the film Ko Saunt Nat (My Guardian Angel).

== Early life ==
Yell Htwe Aung was born on 7 April 1993, in Yangon to Burmese Muslim parents. His father had Gujarati Muslim roots from the state of Gujarat on the Northwestern coast of India, and his mother was Burmese Muslim.

== Career ==
Aung began his career by sharing comedy videos on Facebook, frequently collaborating with Kelvin Kate. In 2015, he was offered the opportunity to become an actor. His debut film was Ko Saunt Nat, directed by Win Lwin Htet. In 2017, he played a role in the feature film Diary, alongside May Myat Noe.

== Death ==
On New Year's Eve 2017, when Aung was attending a party at The One Entertainment Park in Thingangyun Township, he was attacked by a group of men. He was brought to the nearest hospital, but died there on 2 January 2018 from his injuries.

== Aftermath ==
=== Trial and release of suspects ===
Three primary suspects — Than Htut Aung, Pyae Phyo Aung and Kyaw Zaw Han — surrendered to police soon after the incident. They were released on 25 July 2018 after the Yangon Eastern District Court accepted an appeal from Yell Htwe Aung's family asking to settle the case. According to court documents, Yangon Region Attorney General approved the request from his family to drop the case, citing a lack of evidence implicating the accused.

After Than Htut Aung was released, he posted a Facebook profile picture featuring a laughing boy wearing a robber mask, seemingly mocking the laws.

=== Public criticism and subsequent investigations ===
The release of murder suspects without any charges being filed raised public criticism, and prompted calls by lawmakers, activists and lawyers to investigate officials involved in the decision to drop the case. Lawyer Htay expressed surprise when the investigation into the openly committed murder in a public place was dropped. He added that in his 30 years of professional life, he had never heard of such an occurrence. Prominent lawyer and founding member of the Myanmar Lawyers' Network, Thein Than Oo, stated, "The court’s decision to drop the case while the investigation remained incomplete was highly unusual. This case challenges the rule of law in the country and poses a threat to public security".

Netizens initiated a social media campaign named "Failed Law". The significant backlash prompted President Win Myint to take notice of the matter. On 30 July 2018, President Win Myint ordered an investigation, and Attorney General of Myanmar ordered Yangon Region Attorney General to reopen the case at the Yangon Region Court. The Yangon Region Court summoned the three suspects on 1 August 2018.

On 3 August 2018, the Anti-Corruption Commission of Myanmar agreed to look into the case whether there was sufficient evidence involving violations of the Anti-Corruption Law. On 13 September 2018, the Anti-Corruption Commission filed a lawsuit against the Yangon Region Attorney-General Han Htoo, a district judge, three other government attorneys and a police officer for taking bribes worth more than K 70 million (US$46,300) to drop the case.

However, the family members decided to drop the case after negotiating with the family of the perpetrator.

== Filmography ==
=== Film (Cinema) ===
- Ko Saunt Nat (ကိုယ်စောင့်နတ်) (2018)
- Diary (2018)
- Tin String (ကြိုးဖုန်း) (2019)
