= Cambridge Tutors College =

Coordinates: 51.3672°N 0.0908°W

Location
- Water Tower Hill; South Croydon, Greater London, CR0 5SX; England

Information
- Type: Independent
- Established: 1958
- Founder: Roger Osborne
- Closed: June 2025
- Local authority: Croydon
- Department for Education URN: 133528 Tables
- Ofsted: Reports
- Chair of Trust Council: Mr Sampathkumar Mallaya
- Principal: Chris Drew BSc (Sussex), MA (Bath), EdD (Bath), PGCE, DipRSA
- Staff: 40 (approx.)
- Gender: Mixed
- Age: 14 to 23
- Enrolment: 80 (approx)
- Website: http://www.ctc.ac.uk/

Cambridge Tutors College is a private school and sixth form situated in South Croydon, outer London. It was founded in 1958 as a tutorial centre to help boys prepare for their Common Entrance Examination. Students come from over twenty countries, including China, Malaysia, Thailand, Vietnam, Singapore, Myanmar, the Baltics, Balkans, Nigeria, Russia, Ukraine and Kazakhstan.

== Academic programmes ==
Cambridge Tutors College offers two year A-level courses, which start in September, including one with a more focused English language element; fast track, 18 month A-level courses, which start in January.

The college also offers a one-year GCSE course which starts in September and a one-year pre-A level Foundation course which concentrates on the development of English language skills for non-native speakers. In addition to GCSE and A-level courses, the college provides specialist English language support, which focuses on preparation for the IELTS examination. In addition the College offers international students a one year University Foundation course and an accelerated six month Foundation Course. These courses are for students over 17.

== Results and awards ==
In 2022 60% of all A-levels taken were graded A or A*, 95% achieved an A*-C grade. 90% of students gained at least one A grade and 65% gained at least two A grades.

Students were awarded three Council for Independent Education Awards in 2015.

In 2018, the college also received three Good Schools Guide awards for excellence in Mathematics.

== Accreditation ==
Cambridge Tutors College is a member of British Association of Independent Schools with International Students, Council for Independent Education, and the Independent Schools Council. The Principal is also a member of the Independent Schools Association.

== Scholarships and bursaries ==
Academic scholarships are awarded each year to exceptionally able students. Bursaries are allocated in cases of financial need.

== History ==
The college was founded in 1958 by Roger Osborne. Its original purpose was to provide tuition to children preparing for secondary school entrance examinations. The college was originally based in the Surrey village of Warlingham, and moved to its present location in South Croydon in 1967.

In 1973, the college became a charitable trust; it is consequently registered with the Charity Commission.

To date the college has had six principals: Roger Osborne, David Wilson, David Lowe, Mario Di Clemente, Mark Eagers, and the present principal Dr. Chris Drew.
