= Mee Pwar =

Burmese film director

- မီးပွား
- Born: Yangon, Myanmar
- Occupations: Film producer; film director
- Awards: Myanmar Motion Picture Academy Awards 2009

Mee Pwar (မီးပွား) is a Burmese film director who won the Myanmar Motion Picture Academy Awards for best director with the film Zaw Ka Ka Nay The (Dancing the Zawgyi Dance) in 2009.

== Filmography ==
=== Film ===
- Yan Thu 2020
- Problem (Myanmar) 2019
- Kyar Tot The Lal Mg Sagar
- The Enemy (Myanmar)
- Angel of Eden (Burmese Movie)
- Sweet Vengeance for Love 2017
- POST MYANMORE AWARDS 2015 THANK YOU
- Into The Hills
- Zaw-Ka Ka Nay Thi (Dancing the Zawgyi Dance) 2009
- Colorsone Lesson

== Awards and nominations ==
Year	Award	Category	Nominated work	Result
2009	Myanmar Motion Picture Academy Awards	Best Director	Zaw-Ka Ka Nay Thi (Dancing the Zawgyi Dance)	Won
2019	Myanmar Motion Picture Academy Awards	Best Director	Kyar Tot The Lal Mg Sagar	Nominated
