= Kyaw Hsu =

Burmese Series Actor

Kyaw Su
- ကျော်ဆု
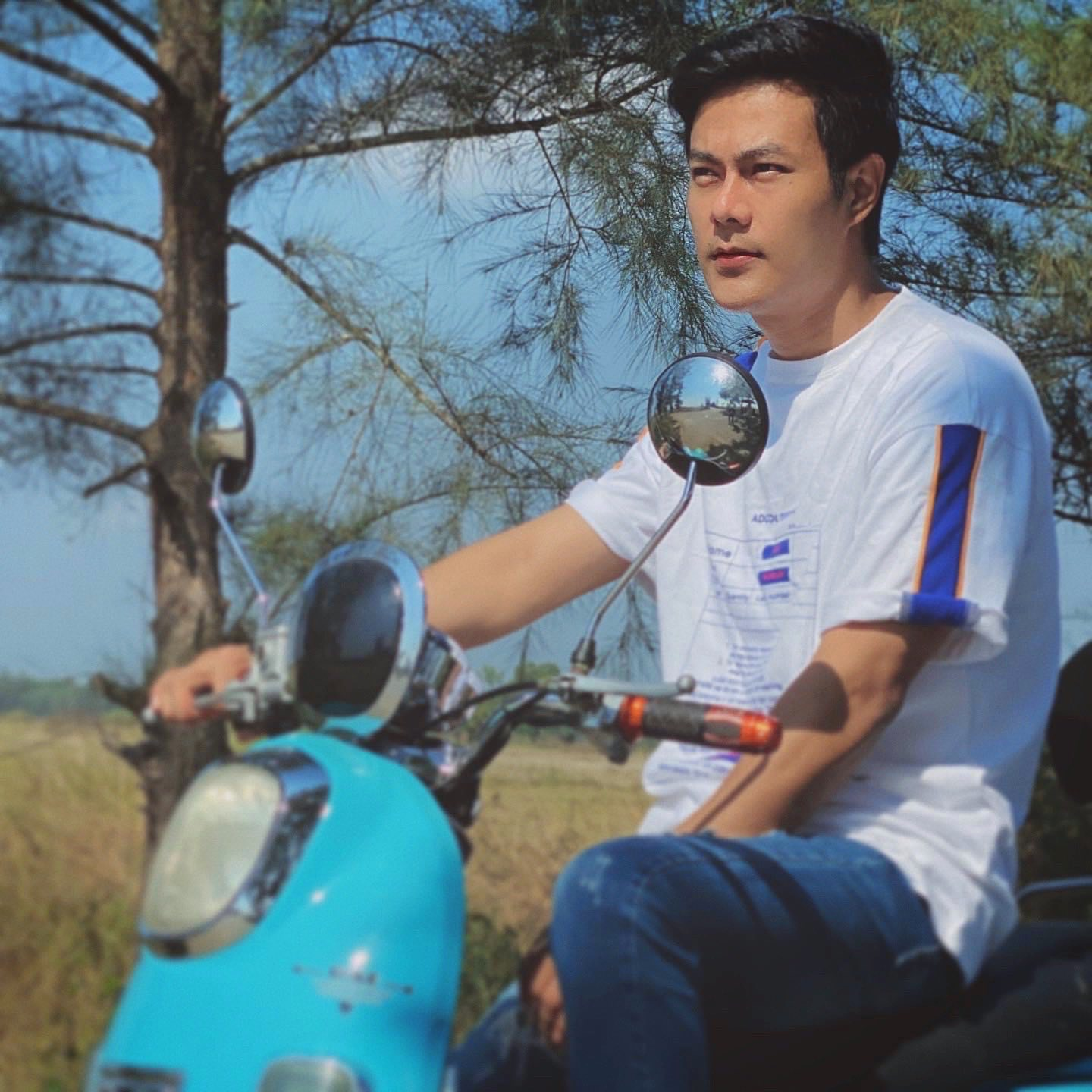
- Born: December 12, 1987 (age 38); Taungoo, Bago Region, Burma
- Education: Taungoo University
- Occupation: Actor
- Years active: 2012–present
- Parent(s): Thein Aung (father); Aye Aye Khaing (mother)
- Relatives: Yin Ei Ei Chaw (sister); Hlwan Paing (brother)

Kyaw Hsu, also spelt Kyaw Su (Burmese: ကျော်ဆု; born 12 December 1987) is a Burmese television actor and singer. He is best known for his role in television series Chit Thu Htwin Tae Atkhayar (2017), Oo Yin Mhu Phit Phu Chin The (2017), Shwe Phoo Sar Sone Yar Myay (2018), Room No.? (2019) and Legends of Warriors (2020).

== Early life and education ==
Kyaw Hsu was born on December 12, 1987, in Taungoo, Bago Region, Myanmar to parents Thein Aung and Aye Aye Khaing. He is the second son of three siblings. His younger brother Hlwan Paing is a singer-songwriter. He attended high school at BEHS 2 Taungoo from 2001 to 2002. He graduated with a degree BSc Zoology from Taungoo University in 2008.

== Career ==
In 2012, he competed for new cast in MRTV-4 Talent Management Centre and he was selected by Forever Group. In 2013, he co-starred in drama series Forever Mandalay alongside Han Lin Thant, May Mi Kyaw Kyaw, Aung Min Khant, Chue Lay, Aung Yay Chan and Myat Thu Thu, aired on MRTV-4, on February 10, 2014. In same year, he starred in comedy-drama series Flowers & Butterflies alongside Kyi Zaw Htet, Nat Khat, Khay Sett Thwin and Soe Nandar Kyaw. In the same year, he starred in comedy series Happy Beach alongside Kyi Zaw Htet, Min Tharke, Khay Sett Thwin, Mone, Wint Yamone Naing, Myat Thu Thu and Zu Zu Zan.

In 2015, he starred in drama series Pan Nu Thway: season 2 alongside Myat Thu Kyaw, May Mi Kyaw Kyaw, May Myint Mo and Chue Lay. In 2016, he starred in drama series Lu Yee Chun alongside Myat Thu Kyaw, Si Thu Win and Chue Lay. In 2017, he starred in drama series Chit Thu Htwin Tae Atkhayar alongside Wint Yamone Naing. In the same year, he starred in drama series Oo Yin Mhu Phit Phu Chin The alongside Khay Sett Thwin, Poe Kyar Phyu Khin and Hein Htet.

In 2018, he starred in comedy series Pyaw Shwin Chin Wit Nyin alongside Wint Yamone Naing. In the same year, he starred in drama series Shwe Phoo Sar Sone Yar Myay alongside Chue Lay. In the same year, he starred in thriller series Toxic alongside Mone (Burmese actress) and Thi Ha. In 2019, he starred in action-drama series Room No.? alongside Nay Chi Shoon Lak, Wint Yamone Naing and Mya Hnin Yee Lwin. In 2020, he starred in military series Legends of Warriors alongside Aung Yay Chan and May Myint Mo.

== Filmography ==
=== Television series ===
- Flowers & Butterflies (2013)
- Happy Beach (2013)
- Forever Mandalay (2014)
- The Sign of Love: Book 2 (2014)
- Pan Nu Thway: season 2 (2015)
- Lu Yee Chun (2016)
- Chit Thu Htwin Tae Atkhayar (2017)
- Oo Yin Mhu Phit Phu Chin The (2017)
- Pyaw Shwin Chin Wit Nyin (2018)
- Shwe Phoo Sar Sone Yar Myay (2018)
- Toxic (2018)
- Room No.? (2019)
- Legends of Warriors (2020)
- Tharaphu(2022)
- သစ္စာ(2023)
- မျက်နှာဖုံးချစ်သူ(2024)
- ကံဆက်ကန်(2025)
- စိန်ပန်းသစ္စာ(2025)
