= Nay Chi Shoon Lak =

Burmese actress and model

- နေခြည်ရွှန်းလက်
- Born: 13 November 1999 (age 26); Yangon, Myanmar
- Other name: A Chi
- Education: National University of Arts and Culture, Yangon
- Occupations: Actress, model
- Years active: 2017–present

Nay Chi Shoon Lak (Burmese: နေခြည်ရွှန်းလက်; born 13 November 1999) is a Burmese television actress. She gained popularity among the audiences after starring her role as Hnin Nway in MRTV-4 television series Myetlone Mhar Alwan Nhotekhan Mhar Marna (2019).

== Early life and education ==
Nay Chi Shoon Lak was born on 13 November 1999, in Yangon, Myanmar. She graduated with BA in Cinematography & Drama from National University of Arts and Culture, Yangon.

== Career ==
In 2017, she began her career by competing in Miss Now How 2017. She was selected as an Academy Shwekyo, who carry the golden trophies presented to Myanmar Academy Award winners, at the 2016 Myanmar Academy Awards Ceremony which gained the first recognition from her fans. In the same year, she was chosen from among almost 100 new talents for MRTV-4 series.

She made her acting debut in 2018 with the drama Bagan Myo Thu, played the role of Goon Nu alongside Daung, May Myint Mo, Htoo Aung and Phone Shein Khant. In 2019, she starred the female lead in drama Myetlone Mhar Alwan Nhotekhan Mhar Marna alongside Aung Min Khant. Her portrayal of the character Hnin Nway earned praised by fans for her acting performance and character interpretation, and experienced a resurgence of popularity. In the same year, she starred in action-drama Room No. ?, played the role of Nan Saw alongside Kyaw Hsu, Wint Yamone Naing and Mya Hnin Yee Lwin.

== Filmography ==
=== Television series ===
- Bagan Myo Thu (2018)
- Myetlone Mhar Alwan Nhotekhan Mhar Marna (2019)
- Room No.? (2019)
