= Higher education in Myanmar =

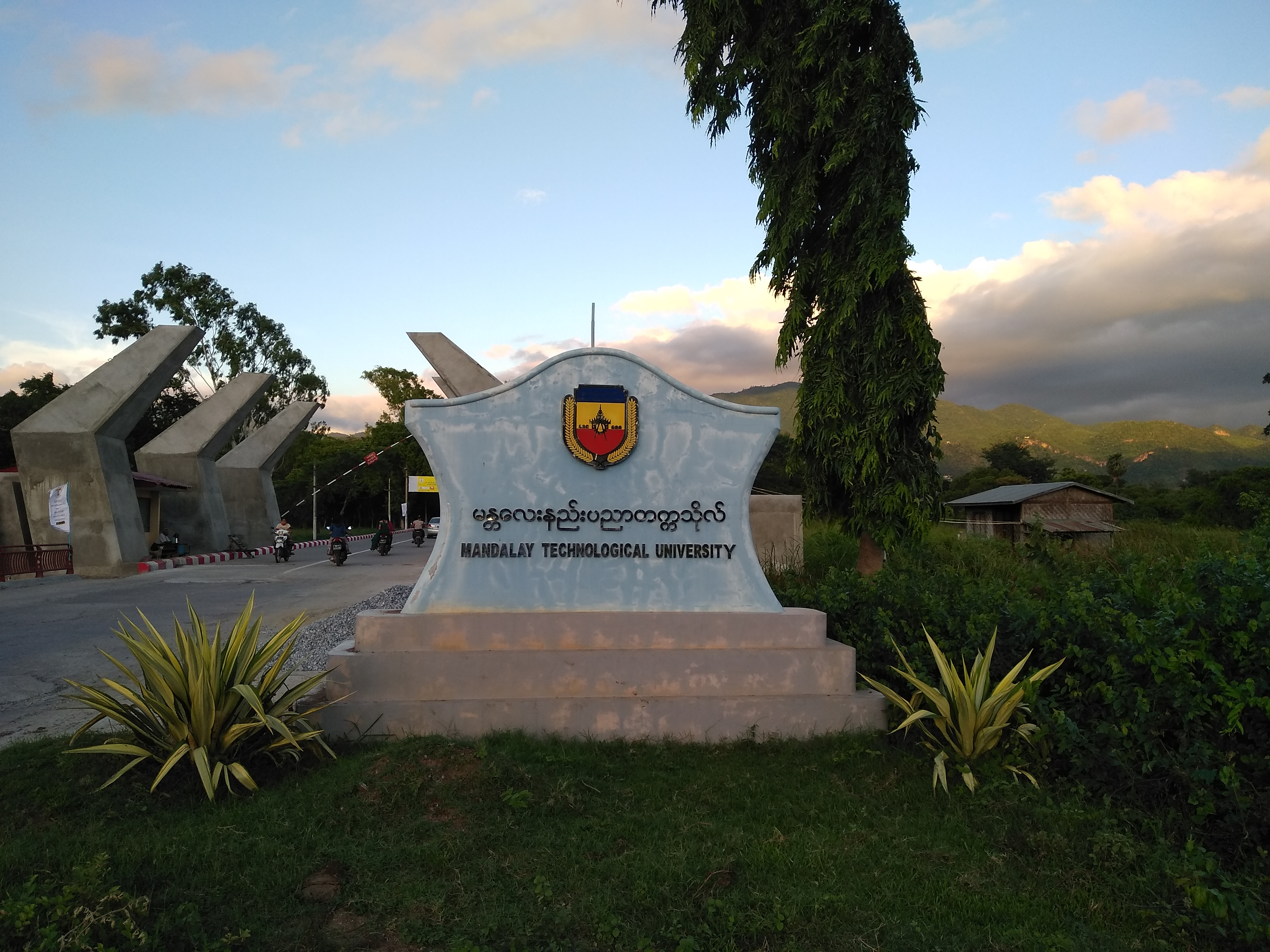
Mandalay Technological University

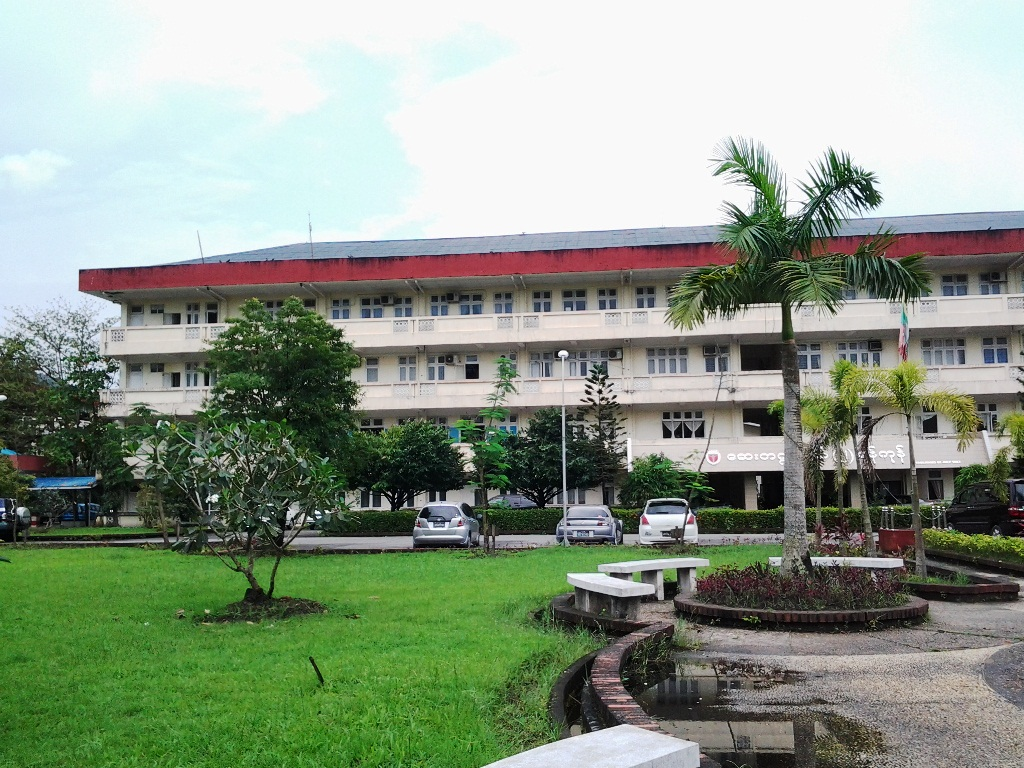
Yangon University of Medicine 2

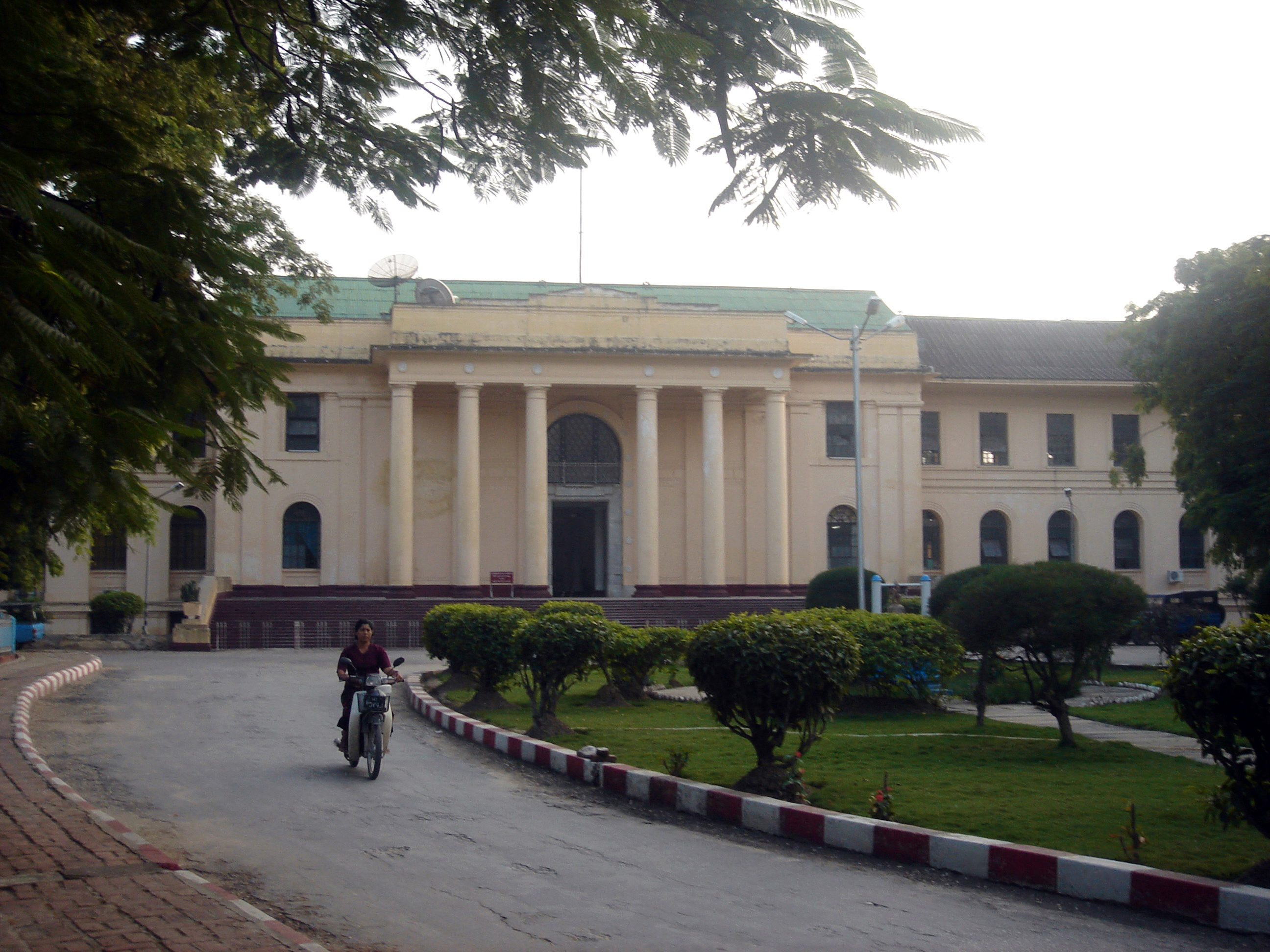
University of Mandalay

Higher education in Myanmar has experienced a large expansion since 1988, although the country ranks as one of the lowest globally for universities. Due to the student protests in the 8888 uprising, the Myanmar government closed down all universities for two years. Additional student protests in 1996 and 1998 caused all universities to be closed for another three years.

The Ministry of Education administers most higher education in Myanmar. The Ministry of Education implements short and long term education development plans to improve the quality, access, and diversity of higher education. The government envisions higher education as an avenue for empowering people to make educated decisions and capitalize on economic opportunities within Myanmar, and therefore, foresees investment in education as a fruitful investment for the people of Myanmar.

== Structure ==
Universities in Myanmar remain highly centralized and state run. Student enrollment in university in 2014 was 550,000. Teaching revolves around textbook instruction with little to no research focus. Universities offer bachelor's degree programs, master's degree programs, and doctorate degree programs. The higher education system follows a 4-1-3 year program with 4 years for a bachelor's degree, one year of qualifying classes, and 3 years for a master's degree.

There are two branches of the Department of Higher Education, one for Lower Myanmar and the other for Upper Myanmar, under the Ministry of Education. The branches are responsible for the administration and coordination of higher education in Myanmar. Higher education administrative policy falls under two councils. The Universities' Central Council holds responsibility in generating broad policies for higher education. The Council of University Academic Bodies' responsibilities lie in academic regulations and academic work. The Myanmar Education Committee was established in 1991 and was renamed the National Education Committee in 2011. The committee remains responsible for up-keeping cultural, social, and traditional values within the education system, while respecting the economic and political visions of the country. The committee is chaired by the Union Minister of Education.

Myanmar has 163 higher education universities. All of the universities are state funded with a funding for higher education for a fiscal year. The higher education funding increased by 107 percent from fiscal year 2012 to 2013 The Ministry of Education controls 66 universities and the remaining 97 universities fall under control of the 12 other ministries. The 12 other ministries include Health, Science and Technology, Defense, Culture, Environmental Conservation and Forestry, Agriculture and Irrigation, Livestock Breeding and Fisheries, Co-operatives, Union Civil Service Board, Religious Affairs, Border Affairs, and Transport. Different disciplines are split between different universities, such as medical, technical, agricultural, educational, and economic schools. The universities are run by their corresponding ministry. For example, medical schools are run by the Ministry of Health and Sports, agricultural schools are run by Ministry of Agriculture and Irrigation, etc. The number of universities in each ministry breaks down in 2011–2012 school year as the following:

| Sr. No. | Ministry | Number |
|---|---|---|
| 1 | Education | 66 |
| 2 | Health | 15 |
| 3 | Science and Technology | 61 |
| 4 | Defense | 5 |
| 5 | Culture | 2 |
| 6 | Environmental Conservation and Forestry | 1 |
| 7 | Agriculture and Irrigation | 1 |
| 8 | Livestock Breeding and Fisheries | 1 |
| 9 | Co-Operatives | 5 |
| 10 | Union Civil Service Board | 1 |
| 11 | Religious Affairs | 1 |
| 12 | Border Affairs | 2 |
| 13 | Transport | 2 |
| Total | | 163 |

There are 33 types of universities, which has increased from 1988 where there were 9 types of universities only offering arts and science disciplines. Some universities have begun offering morning, evening, and night courses, some towards degrees and diplomas, to allow students more flexibility in their schedules.

Myanmar is divided into 24 development zones, and the Ministry of Education ensures that each of these zones has at least one liberal arts and science university, one technical university, and one computer science university. The break down of the number of universities by development zone is as follows:

| State/Region | Number of Institutions |
|---|---|
| Kachin | 9 |
| Kayah | 3 |
| Kayin | 4 |
| Chin | 3 |
| Sagaing | 13 |
| Tainintharyi | 7 |
| Bago | 9 |
| Magway | 11 |
| Mandalay | 36 |
| Mon | 4 |
| Rakhine | 5 |
| Yangon | 33 |
| Shan | 34 |
| Ayeyarwady | 12 |
| Total | 163 |

The Ministry of Education provides two distance-learning universities for students who cannot attend a conventional university. University of Distance Education, Yangon in lower Myanmar and University of Distance Education, Mandalay in upper Myanmar have been established. There are 19 available disciplines at these universities. Myanmar studies, public policy, English, and creative writing are some of the disciplines that have been recently added under the education development plans. Students can transfer credits from conventional universities to universities of distance education and vice versa. The universities of distance education use modern technology to facilitate learning. By using the Satellite Data Broadcasting System, distance education lessons can be transmitted to learning centers that are located most conveniently for students.

The Ministry of Education established the National Center for Human Resource Development to provide students with more flexible options for higher education. The Center creates vocational, technological, and professional courses to meet students' demands. Human resource centers adapt to the needs of local communities such as foreign languages for the tourist industry. Human resource centers offer certificates, degrees, undergraduate diplomas, postgraduate diplomas, and postgraduate degree courses. The human resource centers aim to provide students with a parallel education system that allows individuals to pursue higher levels of knowledge and job-related skills. Students have the flexibility to complete degrees in at their own pace and in their own free time.

== Entrance Structure ==
University entrance derives from students' tenth grade standard examination marks. The Ministry of Education (Burma) runs the matriculation exams, which occur at the same time annually around country. About 300,000 students take the matriculation exam each year. Some universities set a minimum exam score for students acceptance in the university. Minimum scores vary depending on the university, but medical schools and senior engineering schools demand the highest exam scores.

== Development ==
The Ministry of Education created a Thirty-Year Long-Term Education Development Plan to improve the quality of education in Myanmar. The Plan aims to inspire creativity, analytical thinking, and a desire to learn in students. All subjects and disciplines have undergone review. New assessment techniques are being administered to test students depth and breadth of knowledge associated with critical thinking skills to replace the old assessment techniques of rote memorization and fact regurgitation. The Plan desires to create new curriculums and teaching methods to instill analytical thinking, creativity, and modern technological skills in students. A large task of the Thirty-Year Long-Term Education Development Plan is to change the teaching methodology in higher education to learning centered approaches such as project-based learning, problem based learning, and fieldwork. All higher education institutions now have computer training centers and multimedia lecture rooms to improve technological literacy and presentation skills. Teaching seminars and workshops help teaching learn how to promote critical thinking, analytical thinking, problem solving, and creative thinking.

Since December 2002, all universities offer core and foundation courses to expand students' knowledge and provide a more holistic education. The Thirty-Year Long-Term Education Development Plan aims to introduce more multi-disciplinary courses to allow students to integrate different disciplines and think beyond one discipline. Courses focused on specific regional qualities are administered to attend to community needs. The Plan has also been changing the undergraduate education system from a department based system to a faculty based system. This process started in 2002 and has been being implemented in steps.

In 2011, three-year course degree programs changed to four year degree programs to match Association of Southeast Asian Nations (ASEAN) higher education standards. The 2011–2012 school year was the first year to add the additional school year to undergraduate degree programs under the Ministry of Education. Coinciding with the new four-year course path, new curriculums and new syllabuses modeling from ASEAN countries have been introduced in undergraduate and postgraduate universities. University credit systems are changing with the inclusion of academic credit from foreign universities through exchange programs. New undergraduate and graduate programs have been launched to support diversified education programs and to prepare specialists at international standards.

Doctorate programs have been introduced within the past 20 years. By 2012, 4,892 doctorate candidates have received degrees from doctorate programs in Myanmar. Currently, 2,053 students are attending doctorate programs from eight different universities. Doctorate programs invite foreign professors for temporary teaching to increase educational quality. Additionally in 2002, a program was initiated that enabled professors 45 years older and with 10 or more years of teaching experience to attend PhD programs and produce a dissertation from their respective field of study to increase their knowledge without subtracting from their current teaching professions.

== e-Education ==
The objectives of e-Education in Myanmar are as follows:

1. To utilize technology in academic settings
2. To transform the working force to a learning force
3. To create and sustain a learning dominated society
4. To bring Myanmar education to international standards

The Special Four-Year Plan initiated in 2000-2001 FY brought increased technological transformation to academic settings. The Special Four-Year Plan included e-learning centers, computer training centers, and e-resource centers to improve technology learning to higher education institutions under the Ministry of Education. The Ministry of Education administered conference rooms, multimedia lecture rooms, internet access in schools, a video conferencing system. All higher education institutions under the Ministry of Education have access to the internet. The Ministry of Education is using e-learning to provide short-term learning lectures and appeal to a wide array of audiences. Online learning has been introduced at training centers using the Satellite Data Broadcasting System.

The Ministry of Education administers two training programs for teachers and professors for e-instruction. The Postgraduate Diploma in Teaching and Postgraduate Diploma in Multimedia Arts focus on developing ways for educating teachers on incorporating technology and multimedia in the classroom.

== Education Reform ==
The Conference on Development Policy Options, held in February 2012 in Nay Pyi Taw, created the Comprehensive Education Sector Review (CESR) to focus on education reform. Recommendations by the CESR indicates the importance of education reform for economic development in Myanmar. The CESR conducts three phases to ensure the progress of education development.

A Policy Dialogue, Empowering Higher Education-A Vision for Myanmar's Universities, took place on June 29–30, 2013 in Nay Pyi Taw, Myanmar. The Policy Dialogue was requested by the Chair of Higher Education Law and Yangon University Revitalization Committees and the leader of Burma's National League for Democracy, Aung San Suu Kyi. Attendees at the Policy Dialogue targeted education reform to decentralize universities, increase inclusivity and equity of universities, and increase international connectivity.

On October 7, 2013, in Nay Pyi Taw, a forum on Pragmatic Education Reform took place to discuss the laws, regulations, visions, and plans to implement a pragmatic education reform on the national level. The forum provided 19 tasks for the creation of a draft for National Education Policy and Law. The Education Promotion Implementation Committee provides guidance for ensuring the procedures and processes of the education reform. The Union Minister of the Ministry of Technology and Science chairs the Education Promotion Implementation Committee. The committee has a working group consisting of education related ministries and non-government organizations that holds discussions and provides a medium for the public to voice their opinions and ideas on education reform. The working group holds meetings and workshops and accepts emails and letters about public opinion towards the education reform process. A draft of the National Education Law was submitted in May 2014 to the Union Government.

The National Education Law was passed by Parliament in July and signed by President Thein Sein on September 30, 2015. The bill would create a National Education Commission that would have control over the education system by mandating budgets and policies. Since the passing of the National Education Law, there have been student protesting in Yangon and Mandalay claiming that the bill further centralizes higher education. The students demand autonomy for universities.

MOE has successfully completed a 3.5 year Comprehensive Education Sector Review (CESR) to develop an evidence-based National Education Strategic Plan (NESP) for 2016–2021.

NESP Goal of Myanmar: Improved teaching and learning, vocational education and training, research and innovation leading to measurable improvements in student achievement in all schools and educational institutions

The NESP provides a ‘roadmap’ for sector-wide reforms that will dramatically improve access to quality education for students at all levels of the national education system. The NESP will equip Myanmar students, youth and adult learners with the knowledge and skills they need to succeed in the 21st century. The education system will ensure that all citizens:achieve minimum national learning standards, learn how to think critically and creatively, gain leadership skills that enable them to help others in their communities and understand, respect and fulfil the rights and responsibilities of all citizens.

The MOE, Myanmar will endeavour to empower higher education in such ways as: Empowerment through autonomy, which would allow universities to manage their academic activities in an effective manner, Inclusiveness, a basic requirement to ensure equal opportunities for all groups in Myanmar society in terms of access and success in higher education. Empowerment for change, referring to the ability of each university to transform itself into an innovative institution. Empowerment for the future, through reforms of the curriculum and pedagogical practices with the purpose of better preparing the young women and men of Myanmar who will be responsible for creating a more democratic society and building a more productive economy.

== See also ==
- Education in Myanmar
- List of universities in Myanmar
- Ministry of Education (Myanmar)
- Medical Universities (Myanmar)
