= Hsaung Wutyee May =

Burmese actress

- ဆောင်းဝတ်ရည်မေ
- Born: Hsaung Wutyee May; 17 October 1995 (age 30); Yangon, Myanmar
- Other names: Tu Tu, Tu Sein
- Education: West Yangon Technological University; University of Distance Education, Yangon
- Occupations: Actress, model
- Years active: 2011–present
- Height: 5 ft 6 in (1.68 m)
- Parents: Myint Thein (father); Nyo Nyo Win (mother)

Hsaung Wutyee May (Burmese: ဆောင်းဝတ်ရည်မေ; born 17 October 1995) is a Burmese television and film actress. She is best known for her roles in several MRTV-4 series and become popular among the audience with the series Wit Nyin Shite Than (2015), Winkabar San Eain (2015), A Mone Mha The (2017) and Where There is Love (2018).

== Early life and education ==
Hsaung Wutyee May was born on 17 October 1995 in Yangon, Myanmar to parents Myint Thein and Nyo Nyo Win. She is the youngest daughter of two. She attended high school at BEHS 2 Bahan. She studied at West Yangon Technological University (A.G.T.I), majoring in Electronic Communication Engineering. She currently studying in Physics at University of Distance Education, Yangon.

== Career ==
She started her career from the competing in Miss Lapyae Won 2011 and she won the first runner-up award. And then, she was chosen by Forever Group for MRTV-4 series and she got opportunity for acting in many series. From 2013 to 2014, she starred in her first series The Sign of Love season 2 and 3 as the character Phyu Sin Shin Thant. In 2014, she was cast in the series Happy Beach. In the same year, she starred in drama series Benefits of Luck.

In 2015, she starred the main role in thriller-drama series Wit Nyin Shite Than alongside Aung Min Khant, Han Lin Thant, Myat Thu Thu, aired on MRTV-4 on 1 April 2015. Her portrayal of the character Kyal Sin Cho earned praised by fans for her acting performance and character interpretation, and experienced a resurgence of popularity. She then portrayed her role as Saw Kalayar in thriller drama Winkabar San Eain alongside Aung Min Khant, Aung Yay Chan, Phone Shein Khant, Poe Kyar Phyu Khin and Myat Thu Thu. In 2017, she acted in drama Hubris as the character Kyway Kyway alongside Zin Wine, Ye Aung, Han Lin Thant and May Mi Ko Ko. In the same year, she played the main role in drama A Mone Mha The alongside Kyaw Htet Zaw, Kaung Myat San and May Akari Htoo. Then she had to play in films; Shwe Kyar, and Sit Ko Mone Ywae Tite Ke Thi in 2018.

In 2019, she gains increased attention and popularity with her role as Thet Thet Zaw in drama Where There is Love alongside Kaung Myat San, aired on MRTV-4 on 11 March 2019. The same year, she starred in comedy series Nat A Lo Jo A Ma and drama Love Signal. In 2020, she was cast as Mary in Adin's Challenge.

In 2022, she starred in a comedy series Su Taung. Later in the same year, she regained popularity with her role as Khin Pyae Sone in 101% Love and is praised for her chemistry with her co-star Kaung Myat San .

After 12 years of rosing fame on MRTV-4, she left Forever Group in 2024 and started working freelance to take on more complex acting roles under various television channels.

== Filmography ==
=== Film (Cinema) ===
- Shwe Kyar (ရွှေကြာ) (2018)
- Sit Ko Mone Ywae Tite Ke Thi (စစ်ကိုမုန်း၍တိုက်ခဲ့သည်) (2018)
- Players (2020)
- Oxygen (2024)
- Yite Pauk (ရိုက်ပေါက်) (2026)

=== Film ===
- A Nya Ta Ya Moe Kaung Kin (အညတရမိုးကောင်းကင်) (2016)
- Nyoe Ywae Nyoo (ငြိုး၍ညှိုး)
- A Phyu Yaung Thet Tant (အဖြူရောင်သက်တန့်)

=== Television series ===
Year	English title	Myanmar title	Role	Network	Note
2013	The Sign of Love: season 2	အချစ်သင်္ကေတ အတွဲ ၂	Phyu Sin Shin Thant	MRTV-4	
2014	The Sign of Love: season 3	အချစ်သင်္ကေတ အတွဲ ၃	Phyu Sin Shin Thant	MRTV-4	
2014	Happy Beach			MRTV-4	
2014	Benefits of Luck	ကံကံ၏အကျိုး	Guest Appearance	MRTV-4	
2015	Wit Nyin Shite Than	ဝိညာဉ်ရှိုက်သံ	Kyal Sin Cho	MRTV-4	
2015	Winkabar San Eain	ဝင်္ကပါစံအိမ်	Saw Kalayar	MRTV-4	
2017	Hubris	မာန်	Kyway Kyway	MRTV-4	
2017	A Mone Mha The	အမုန်းမှသည်	Nay Cho Thway	MRTV-4	
2018	Where There is Love	ချစ်ခြင်းတရားတို့ရှိရာ	Thet Thet Zaw	MRTV-4	
2019	Nat A Lo Jo A Ma	နတ်အလိုဂျိုအမ	Ngwe Kyar	MRTV-4	
2019	Love Signal	အချစ်ဆစ်ဂနယ်		MRTV-4	
2022	Su Taung	ဆုတောင်း	Sandar Kyaw	MRTV-4	
2022	101% Love	၁၀၁%အချစ်	Khin Pyae Sone	MRTV-4	
2023	Poisonous Love	အဆိပ်လိုအချစ်	Shin Thant	MRTV-4	
TBA	Adin Challenge	ဧဒင်ချဲလန့်			
2024	A Mone Myit Kan Par	အမုန်းမြစ်ကမ်းပါး	Wutyee Htin Kyaw	Mahar	
2025	Pyoe Oo Yin	ပျိုးဥယျာဉ်	Yoon	Mahar	
2025	Nar Yee	နာရီ	Myu Hnin	Bebee TV	
2025	A Chit Mhar Apyit Shi The	အချစ်မှာအပြစ်ရှိသည်	Maya	Mahar	
2025	Hnyoe	ငြိုး	Hsue	Canal+	
2026	Moe Kyway Tae Hsaung	မိုးကြွေတဲ့ဆောင်း	Myo Ma Ma	Canal+	
