= Kaung Myat San =

Burmese actor and model

- ကောင်းမြတ်စံ
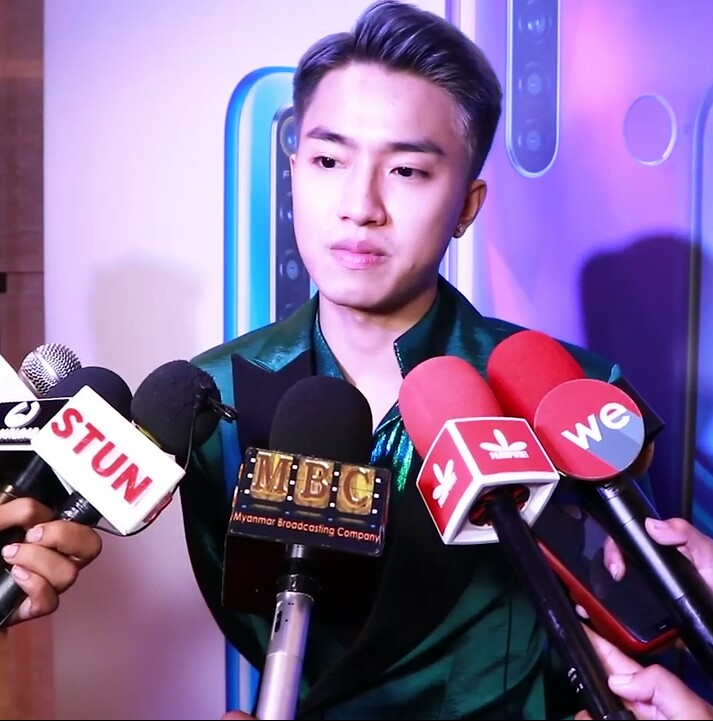
- Kaung Myat San
- Born: Kaung Myat San; December 14, 1993 (age 32); Mandalay, Mandalay Division, Union of Myanmar (now Mandalay, Mandalay Region, Myanmar
- Education: Yadanabon University
- Occupations: Actor, model
- Years active: 2013–present
- Parent(s): Thein San (father); Mar Mar Nyo (mother)

Kaung Myat San (Burmese: ကောင်းမြတ်စံ; born 14 December 1993) is a Burmese television and film actor and model. He is best known for his roles in television series, including Yadanar Htae Ka Yadanar (2017), A Mone Mha The (2017), Closest to the Heart (2018), Where There is Love (2019) and The Missing Truth (2019).

== Early life and education ==
Kaung Myat San was born on September 6, 1993, in Yangon, Myanmar, to parents Thein San and Mar Mar Nyo. He attended at Basic Education High School No. 2 Mandalay. He graduated with a degree B.A English from Yadanabon University.

== Career ==
In 2012, he arrived at Yangon and he participated in King of Denim 2012 Contest. He also competed in the MRTV-4's competition for the new cast for The Sign of Love series and he was selected. Then he starred in his debut MRTV-4 drama series The Sign of Love alongside Myat Thu Kyaw, Soe Nandar Kyaw, Wint Yamone Naing, Hsaung Wutyee May and May Myint Mo.

In 2017, he starred in drama series Yadanar Htae Ka Yadanar alongside Aung Min Khant and Myat Thu Thu. In the same year, he starred in drama series A Mone Mha The alongside Kyaw Htet Zaw and Hsaung Wutyee May. In 2018, he starred in drama series Closest to the Heart alongside Nan Sandar Hla Htun.

In 2019, he starred in drama series Where There is Love alongside Hsaung Wutyee May. In the same year, he starred in thriller drama series The Missing Truth alongside Lu Min, May Myint Mo and Naw Phaw Eh Htar.

== Filmography ==
=== Film (Cinema) ===
- Yoma Paw Kya Tae Myet Yay (ရိုးမပေါ်ကျတဲ့မျက်ရည်) (2019)
- Sar Rade Tah (စာရိတ္တ) (2023)
- Shwe Phu Sar (ရွှေဖူးစာ) (2024)
- Sar Rade Tah 2 (စာရိတ္တ ၂) (2024)
- 168 Hours (၁၆၈ နာရီ) (2025)
- Ex (ရည်းစားဟောင်း) (2025)
- Yite Pauk (ရိုက်ပေါက်) (2026)
- Pway Shate (ပွေရှိတ်) (2026)

=== Television series ===
- The Sign of Love (အချစ်သင်္ကေတ) (2012)
- The Sign of Love : Season 2 (အချစ်သင်္ကေတ အတွဲ ၂) (2012)
- The Sign of Love : Season 3 (အချစ်သင်္ကေတ အတွဲ ၃) (2013)
- Happy Beach : Season 1 (Ep.18 Guest) (2013)
- Eain Nee Chin (အိမ်နီးချင်း) (2015)
- Yadanar Htae Ka Yadanar (ရတနာထဲကရတနာ) (2017)
- A Mone Mha The (အမုန်းမှသည်) (2017)
- Closest to the Heart (နှလုံးသားနှင့်အနီးဆုံး) (2018)
- Where There is Love (ချစ်ခြင်းတရားတို့ရှိရာ) (2019)
- The Missing Truth (ပျောက်ဆုံးနေသောအမှန်တရား) (2019)
- Ywar Lal Tae Phu Sar (ရွာလည်တဲ့ဖူးစာ) (2022)
- 101% Love (၁၀၁% အချစ်) (2022)
- The Story of My Beloved (အချစ်ဆုံးသူရဲ့အတ္ထုပ္ပတ္တိ) (2025)
- Golden Lotus In The Wave (လှိုင်းလေကြားကပန်းရွှေကြာ) (2025)
- Poisoned Wine (အဆိပ်သင့်ဝိုင်) (2026)
- Kat ti Mae Gayhar (ဣတ္ထိမဲ့ဂေဟာ) (2026)
