= Dark Castle (disambiguation) =

Dark Castle may refer to:

- Dark Castle, a video game
- Dark Castle Entertainment, a film company
- Dark Castle (band), music band
- Dark Castle (1975) novel written by Anne Mather
- Dark Castle (TV Series) a Burmese drama television series
