= Gandaba: Strings of a Broken Harp =

2020 Burmese film

- Film Poster
- Burmese: ဂန္ဒဗ္ဗ
- Directed by: Aung Ko Latt; Kitaro Kanematsu
- Screenplay by: Hector Carosso
- Produced by: Aung Ko Latt; Hector Carosso; Hiroaki Uchiyama
- Starring: Donnaa Layla; Shunya Shiraishi; Shun Sugata; Win Morisaki; Yan Aung; Khin Zarchi Kyaw; Sithu Maung
- Production companies: Aung Ko Latt Motion Picture; Shochiku
- Distributed by: Aung Ko Latt Motion Picture
- Release date: January 23, 2020 (Myanmar)
- Running time: 104 minutes
- Countries: Myanmar; Japan
- Languages: Burmese; Japanese; English

Gandaba: Strings of a Broken Harp (Burmese: ဂန္ဒဗ္ဗ) is a 2020 Burmese historical & musical-drama film, directed by Aung Ko Latt & Kitaro Kanematsu. It is written by Hector Carosso and it is the second full-length fantasy film of Aung Ko Latt, produced in collaboration with Shochiku Co., Ltd. and the Japanese Society of Cinematographers. The film was premiered in Myanmar Cinemas on January 23, 2020.

== Synopsis ==
Kalyar's childhood in Burma revived the dreams of an ancient harpist and an ancient lover in Bagan, hoping to become a Burmese harpist like her parents. Sharing her dreams is Hiroshi, a Shamisen musician from Japan, who met Kalyar and Bagan on his fateful visit to Bagan. They soon discover that their dreams come true, but there is an unseen danger in the past and present.

== Cast ==
- Donnaa Layla as Kalyar, O Kyar Phyu
- Shunya Shiraishi as Hiroshi, Nga Phone Thin
- Shun Sugata
- Win Morisaki
- Yan Aung
- Khin Zarchi Kyaw
- Sithu Maung
