= The Sun, The Moon and The Truth =

Burmese television series

- Burmese: နေရယ်လရယ်အမှန်တရားရယ်
- Genre: Legal drama
- Directed by: Aung Ko Latt
- Starring: Moe Yan Zun; Su Pan Htwar; Phone Thike; Nay Yan; Khin Zarchi Kyaw
- Theme music composer: Aung Ko Latt
- Country of origin: Myanmar
- Original language: Burmese
- No. of seasons: 2
- No. of episodes: 18

Production
- Executive producers: MyJustice; Pyoe Pin Institute
- Producer: Swe Zin Htaik
- Production location: Myanmar
- Editors: Zaw Win Htwe; Khin Myanmar
- Running time: 45 minutes
- Production company: Aung Ko Latt's Production

Original release
- Network: MRTV
- Release: 13 February 2015 – 26 September 2018

The Sun, The Moon and The Truth (Burmese: နေရယ်လရယ်အမှန်တရားရယ်) is a Burmese legal drama television series. It aired on MRTV for 18 episodes. Season 1 aired from February 13, to April 3, 2015, on every Friday at 21:30 for 8 episodes and season 2 aired from September 5 to 26, 2018, on every Wednesday, Thursday and Friday at 19:15 for 10 episodes.

== Cast ==
- Su Pan Htwar as May Hnin Si
- Moe Yan Zun as Sai Thura
- Nay Yan as Htun Naing
- Phone Thike as Nay Min Htet
- Khin Zarchi Kyaw as Khin Khin
- Nyi Nanda as Khine Htoo San
