= The Sign of Love: Book 2 =

Burmese television series

- Poster
- Genre: Drama
- Screenplay by: Myo Min Htwe(Head-Writer); Moe Hein June
- Directed by: Kaung Zan
- Starring: Wint Yamone Naing; Han Lin Thant; Kyaw Hsu; Myat Thu Thu; Phone Shein Khant
- Theme music composer: Myint Moe Aung
- Country of origin: Myanmar
- Original language: Burmese
- No. of episodes: 40

Production
- Executive producer: Khin Lay
- Producers: Naing Than; Aung Pyi Soe; May Thu Phay
- Production location: Myanmar
- Cinematography: Ms. Alma Dela Pena; Kyaw Min Thein
- Editors: Aye Su Su Lwin; Phone Pyae Sone
- Running time: 40 minutes
- Production company: Media Kabar

Original release
- Network: MRTV-4
- Release: 15 September – 7 November 2014

The Sign of Love: Book 2 is a 2014 Burmese drama television series. It aired on MRTV-4, from September 15 to November 7, 2014, from Mondays to Fridays at 19:10 for 40 episodes.

== Cast ==
- Wint Yamone Naing as Chit Su
- Han Lin Thant as Zwe Htet
- Kyaw Hsu as Hnin Myaing
- Myat Thu Thu as Wint Shwe Yi
- Phone Shein Khant as Wunna
- Min Tharke as Shin Takkha
- Thet Oo Ko as U Myint Nanda
- Soe Nandar Kyaw as Myat Noe Khin
- Eaint Kyar Phyu as Daw Shwe Myaing
- Su Hlaing Hnin as Daw San Nu Yin
- May Thinzar Oo as Daw Aye Nyein
- Theingi Htun as Daw May Mi
- Khin Moht Moht Aye as Daw Sein Khin
- Hla Hla Win as Phwar Zar Yu
