= Wit Nyin Shite Than =

Burmese television series

- Burmese: ဝိညာဉ်ရှိုက်သံ
- Genre: Thriller
- Directed by: Roongravee Maneeprem
- Starring: Aung Min Khant; Hsaung Wutyee May; Han Lin Thant; May Mi Kyaw Kyaw; Khin Sandar Myint; Ei Si Kway
- Theme music composer: Shwe Jaw Jaw (ရွှေဂျော်ဂျော်)
- Country of origin: Myanmar
- Original language: Burmese
- No. of episodes: 45

Production
- Executive producers: Brian L.Marcar; Khin Lay
- Producers: Naing Than; Soe Thura
- Production location: Myanmar
- Editors: Nay Min Tin; Htet Paing Oo; Phone Pyae Sone
- Running time: 30 minutes Mondays to Fridays at 19:15 (MMT)
- Production company: Forever Bec-Tero

Original release
- Network: MRTV-4
- Release: 1 April – 2 June 2015

Wit Nyin Shite Than (Burmese: ဝိညာဉ်ရှိုက်သံ; lit. 'Cry of the Spirit') is a 2015 Burmese thriller television series. It is the first thriller television series in Myanmar. It aired on MRTV-4, from April 1 to June 2, 2015, on Mondays to Fridays at 19:15 for 45 episodes.

== Cast ==
=== Main ===
- Aung Min Khant as Hein Htut Khaung
- Hsaung Wutyee May as Kyal Sin Cho
- Han Lin Thant as Nay Htut Khaung
- May Mi Kyaw Kyaw as Mabel
- Ei Si Kway as Shwe Min Myat
- Khin Sandar Myint as Suzan

=== Supporting ===
- Myat Thu Thu as Ei Shwe Sin
- Myat Kay Thi Aung as Kay Thi Soe
- Aung Khaing as U Shwe La Yaung
- War War Aung as Daw Saw Mon Gyi
- Su Hlaing Hnin as Htar Ei
- Zin Myo as Min Nay La
- Daung Wai as Lu Zaw
- Kyaw Htet as Ye Kyaw
- Zu Zu Zan
