= The Attachment =

2018 Burmese film

- Film Poster
- Burmese: ဥပါဒါန်
- Directed by: Ban Gyi
- Screenplay by: Maung Aung (Physics)
- Produced by: Ban Gyi
- Starring: Khine Htoo Thar; Zar Ti; Nan Su Oo; May Thinzar Oo; Khin Zarchi Kyaw; Cho Pyone; Nyein Chan; Myo Myo Khine; May Paing Soe
- Cinematography: Toe Win; Ar Noe
- Edited by: Thaw Zin
- Music by: Diramore
- Production company: Zayyar Shwe Pyi Film Production
- Release date: May 18, 2018 (Myanmar)
- Running time: 112 minutes
- Country: Myanmar
- Language: Burmese

The Attachment (Burmese: ဥပါဒါန်; released in Thailand as Obsession) is a 2018 Burmese drama film directed by Ban Gyi and starring Khine Htoo Thar, Zar Ti, Nan Su Oo, May Thinzar Oo, Khin Zarchi Kyaw, Cho Pyone and May Paing Soe. The film, produced by Zayyar Shwe Pyi Film Production premiered in Myanmar on May 18, 2018.

== Cast ==
- Khine Htoo Thar as The Monk, Wunna Thiri
- Zar Ti as Monk#
- Nan Su Oo as Pyae Sone Khin
- Khin Zarchi Kyaw as Khin Hmone
- Cho Pyone as Granny
- May Paing Soe as Sister of Pyae Sone Khin
- Nyein Chan as The Villager#1
- Myo Myo Khine as The Villager#2
- Nine Nine Htet as Novice Monk, Wunna Thiri
