= Closest to the Heart =

Burmese television series

- Burmese: နှလုံးသားနှင့်အနီးဆုံး
- Genre: Romance; Comedy; Drama
- Written by: Soe Kyaw Sann(Academy); Myo Min Htwe
- Directed by: Bec-Tero
- Starring: Kaung Myat San; Nan Sandar Hla Htun; Swan Htet Nyi Nyi; May Akari Htoo; Thi Ha
- Theme music composer: Wai Gyi
- Country of origin: Myanmar
- Original language: Burmese
- No. of episodes: 20

Production
- Executive producers: Mr.Brian L.Marcar; Khin Lay
- Production location: Myanmar
- Running time: 40 minutes Mondays to Fridays at 19:15 (MMT)
- Production company: Forever Bec-Tero

Original release
- Network: MRTV-4
- Release: 30 October – 26 November 2018

Closest to the Heart (Burmese: နှလုံးသားနှင့်အနီးဆုံး) is a 2018 Burmese romantic-drama television series. It aired on MRTV-4, from October 30 to November 26, 2018, on Mondays to Fridays at 19:00 for 20 episodes.

== Synopsis ==
When a hot-tempered girl Moe Ma Kha moves into her family's house, she meets an overly friendly neighbor Kaung Myat Thu who happens to work in the same company as her. While struggling to balance familial duty, work and nuisance with her ex-boyfriend, she is greeted with more trouble when her younger brother's career takes off, with Kaung Myat Thu accidentally being involves in all the distress. Now she must deals with the conflicts in her life and learn to slowly accept people from past and present.

== Cast ==
=== Main ===
- Nan Sandar Hla Htun as Moe Ma Kha, a hot-headed and sensitive goody two shoes who is struggling to keep in line. After her father's passing, she becomes the only source of finance her family rely on, carrying the burden of stability and perfectionism.
- Kaung Myat San as Kaung Myat Thu, a kind-hearted, naive and talented young boy who works as a setting designer. He is a helpful next door neighbor to Moe Ma Kha's family and a brother figure to Ye Yint.

=== Supporting ===
- Thi Ha as Min Khant Naung, an old high school friend of Moe Ma Kha and a client at Success Advertising Media Group.
- Swan Htet Nyi Nyi as Thura Zaw, a disloyal and lustful ex-boyfriend of Moe Ma Kha who relentlessly tries to reconcile with her.
- May Akari Htoo as Cherry, newly employed stylist at Success Advertising Media Group with a quirky sense of mind.
- Heavy Phyo as Ye Yint, an aspiring actor, musician and a determined younger brother of Moe Ma Kha. He is reckless at times but extremely hardworking and cares for his family.
- Paing Oak Soe Aung as Sithu Kyaw, a rebellious nephew of Min Khant Naung and reluctant co-worker of Ye Yint.
- Mayn Hein as Nanda, Kaung Myat Thu's expressive and spontaneous best friend.
- Nyi Nanda as U Aung Htake, the boss and the owner of Success Advertising Media Group.
- Lin Zarni Zaw as a caring widow mother of Moe Ma Kha, Ye Yint and Lin Pwint.
- Zu Zu Honey Htun as Lin Pwint, Moe Ma Kha and Ye Yint's younger sister.
