= Room No.? =

Burmese television series

- Poster
- Burmese: အခန်းနံပါတ်?
- Genre: Action; Drama
- Directed by: Ko Thaung (ကိုသောင်း)
- Starring: Kyaw Hsu; Nay Chi Shoon Lak; Wint Yamone Naing; Mya Hnin Yee Lwin; Lin Myat
- Country of origin: Myanmar
- Original language: Burmese
- No. of episodes: 30

Production
- Executive producer: Khin Lay
- Producers: Naing Than; Hla Phyo
- Production location: Myanmar
- Running time: 40 minutes Mondays to Fridays at 19:00 (MMT)
- Production company: Forever Group

Original release
- Network: MRTV-4
- Release: 17 December 2019 – 28 January 2020

Room No.? (Burmese: အခန်းနံပါတ်?) is a Burmese action drama television series. It aired on MRTV-4, from December 17, 2019 to January 28, 2020, on Mondays to Fridays at 19:00 for 30 episodes.

== Cast ==
- Kyaw Hsu as Banyar
- Nay Chi Shoon Lak as Nan Saw
- Wint Yamone Naing as Nwe Ni Hlaing
- Mya Hnin Yee Lwin as Hsu Htet
- Lin Myat as Nay Yaung Htun
