= Chit Thu Htwin Tae Atkhayar =

Burmese television series

- Burmese: ချစ်သူထွင်းတဲ့အက္ခရာ
- Genre: Drama
- Directed by: Hla Phyo
- Starring: Kyaw Hsu; Wint Yamone Naing
- Country of origin: Myanmar
- Original language: Burmese
- No. of episodes: 50

Production
- Executive producer: Khin Lay
- Production location: Myanmar
- Running time: 40 minutes Mondays to Fridays at 19:15 (MMT)
- Production company: Forever Bec-tero

Original release
- Network: MRTV-4
- Release: 27 March – 5 June 2017

Chit Thu Htwin Tae Atkhayar (Burmese: ချစ်သူထွင်းတဲ့အက္ခရာ) is a 2017 Burmese drama television series. It aired on MRTV-4, from March 27 to June 5, 2017, on Mondays to Fridays at 19:15 for 50 episodes.

== Cast ==
- Kyaw Hsu as Nanda
- Wint Yamone Naing as May Htake Htar San
- Kyaw Htet as Thuria
- Han Na Lar as Shwe Yi
- Min Khant Ko as Sit Paing
- Wai Yan Kyaw as Zaw Gyi
- Ju Jue Pan Htwar as Nan Mo
- Phoe Kyaw as U San Shwe
- La Pyae as Htun Hla
