= Kayan Beauties =

- Poster
- Burmese: ကယန်းအလှ
- Directed by: Aung Ko Latt
- Screenplay by: Hector Carosso
- Story by: Aung Ko Latt
- Produced by: Aung Ko Latt; Hector Carosso
- Starring: Hin Mai; New Ni Win; Khin Mar Win; Rose Mary; Francis
- Release date: 2012
- Running time: 88 minutes
- Country: Myanmar
- Languages: Kayan, Burmese

Kayan Beauties (Burmese: ကယန်းအလှ) is a 2012 Burmese film written and directed by Aung Ko Latt. The film tells the story of four Kayan girls traveling from Kayah State to Taunggyi and deals with themes of human trafficking and cultural exploitation.

== Plot ==
The film begins in a Kayan village and centres around three Kayan women, who are planning to travel to Taunggyi to sell their handicrafts. They are accompanied on the trip by a younger girl. When they arrive in Taunggyi, the younger girl gets separated from them at the market and falls into the hands of human traffickers. The other three girls must try to find her before she is trafficked away.

== Cast ==
- Hin Mai as Mu Pau
- New Ni Win as Mu Lai
- Khin Mar Win as Mu Dan
- Rose Mary as Mu Yan
- Francis as Khu Da

== Themes ==
The film deals with human trafficking and the filmmakers hoped that it would raise awareness of the issue, as well as drawing attention to the word "Kayan" and how the Kayan prefer this ethnonym to the exonymic "Padaung".

== Production ==
The film was produced by Aung Ko Latt Motion Pictures and the screenplay was written by Hector Carosso. The bulk of filming was completed in Shan and Kayah States over three months in 2008. It was the first film made in Myanmar to use the Dolby Digital Surround EX surround-sound system and all the production equipment had to be sourced from outside Myanmar, meaning the crew had to learn how to use it before production. According to the director, cost around ten times more than the average film made in Myanmar On set, five different languages were spoken, including English, Burmese, Kayan, and Japanese. The four primary actors were Kayan women with little previous acting experience.

== Reception ==
The film premiered in Naypyitaw in 2012. In 2013, at the Asean International Film Festival, the film was nominated for Best Director of Photography (Aung Ko Latt) and Best Supporting actress (Rose Mary), and won a special jury award. At the 56th Myanmar Academy Awards, Kayan Beauties was recognised as Aung Ko Latt won best cinematography and Tony Lin won Best Sound award for their work on the film. At a Kayan national festival in 2014, in a ceremony attended by Roman Catholic Archbishop Matthias Shwe and senior Buddhist monks, the filmmakers were honoured with awards that expressed the appreciation of the Kayan community for the film.

== Festival Screenings ==
- Soho International Film Festival.
- Pyongyang International Film Festival, 2014.
- Celluloid Bainbridge Film Festival, 14 November 2014.
- Yangon Women's Festival 2015.
- Tingin ASEAN Festival, 11–15 October 2017
