= Nat A Lo Jo A Ma =

Burmese television series

- Burmese: နတ်အလိုဂြိုဟ်အမ
- Genre: Comedy
- Based on: Nat A Lo Jo A Ma by Maung Nge Yin Thway
- Screenplay by: Chit Chaw
- Directed by: Kyaw Zawe Lin (ကျော်ဇောလင်း)
- Starring: Hein Yatu; Hsaung Wutyee May; Yoon Shwe Yi; Kyar Si; Nyein Chan; Shin Min Thu; Aung Thaw; Myaut Shone; Aung Maw
- Country of origin: Myanmar
- Original language: Burmese
- No. of episodes: 20

Production
- Executive producer: Khin Lay
- Producers: Naing Than; Mg Thi
- Production location: Myanmar
- Editors: Thazin Moe; Khin La Pyae Win
- Running time: 40 minutes Mondays to Fridays at 20:45 (MMT)
- Production company: Forever Group

Original release
- Network: MRTV-4
- Release: 31 July – 27 August 2019

Nat A Lo Jo A Ma (Burmese: နတ်အလိုဂြိုဟ်အမ) is a 2019 Burmese comedy television series. It aired on MRTV-4, from July 31 to August 27, 2019, on Mondays to Fridays at 20:45 for 20 episodes.

== Cast ==
- Hein Yatu as Wai Yan Moe Myaw
- Hsaung Wutyee May as Ngwe Kyar
- Kyar Si as Shwe Kyar
- Yoon Shwe Yi as Hla Hla Lone
- Nyein Chan as U Moe Myaw
- Shin Min Thu as Thiri Moe Myaw
- Aung Thaw as Nga Dain
- Myaut Shone as Nga Daung
- Aung Maw as Du Wai Wai
