= Shwe Phoo Sar Sone Yar Myay =

Burmese television series

- Burmese: ရွှေဖူးစာဆုံရာမြေ
- Genre: Drama
- Directed by: Phuriwat Anusri
- Starring: Kyaw Hsu; Chue Lay
- Country of origin: Myanmar
- Original language: Burmese
- No. of episodes: 33

Production
- Executive producers: Brian L.Marcar; Khin Lay
- Production location: Myanmar
- Running time: 40 minutes Mondays to Fridays at 19:00 (MMT)
- Production company: Forever Bec-tero

Original release
- Network: MRTV-4
- Release: 26 December 2018 – 11 February 2019

Shwe Phoo Sar Sone Yar Myay (Burmese: ရွှေဖူးစာဆုံရာမြေ; lit. 'The Land Where Golden Love Destiny Meets') is a Burmese drama television series. It aired on MRTV-4, from December 26, 2018 to February 11, 2019, on Mondays to Fridays at 19:00 for 33 episodes.

== Cast ==
- Chue Lay as Cho Cho Chit
- Kyaw Hsu as San Min Aung
- Phone Sett Thwin as Min Thukha
- May Thinzar Oo as Daw Sein Chit
- Zin Cho Khine Oo as Thuzar
- Yan Aung as U Lin Aung
- Khine Hnin Wai as Daw Yuzana
- Phu Sone as Daw Thet Htar Khin
- Thun Thitsar Zaw as Thet Htar Shwe Sin
- La Pyae as Paing Thu Aung
