= The Sign of Love =

Burmese television series

- Also known as: A Chit Thinketa (အချစ်သင်္ကေတ)
- Genre: Soap opera
- Written by: (Creator); J. Dennis C Teodosio; Head-writer; Kyi Phyu Lwin; Aye Kyi Thar Han; Episode-writer; Khin Zaw Lwin; Kyaw Ye Thant; Season 3 & 4; Head-writer; Myo Min Htwe; Episodewriter; Myo Min Htwe; Moe Hein John; Soe Lu Zaw
- Directed by: Kaung Zan; Htinn Kyaw
- Starring: Myat Thu Kyaw; Soe Nanda Kyaw; Hsaung Wutyee May; Wint Yamone Naing; Kaung Myat San; Phone Shein Htet; May Myint Mo; Pyae Phyo Aung
- Country of origin: Myanmar
- Original language: Burmese
- No. of seasons: 3
- No. of episodes: 62 (22+20+20)

Production
- Executive producer: Khin Lay
- Producers: Naing Than; Aung Pyay Noe; May Thu Wei
- Production location: Burma
- Cinematography: Pyi Thit Naing
- Running time: 30 minutes
- Production company: Media Kabar

Original release
- Network: MRTV-4
- Release: April 30, 2012 – April 16, 2013

The Sign of Love (Burmese: အချစ်သင်္ကေတ or A Chit Thinketa) is a Burmese dramatic television series, the first Burmese language series to be aired on Burmese television stations. Season 1 aired from April 30 to May 29, 2012 for 22 episodes. Season 2 aired from October 8 to November 2, 2012 for 20 episodes. Season 3 aired from March 20 to April 16, 2013 for 20 episodes.

The Sign of Love third season, with its season premiere on 18 March 2013. The series was entered into the 2013 Seoul International Drama Awards.

The series is jointly produced by two local directors, Kaung Zan and Htin Kyaw, and a French team led by director Benoit de Lorme. The selected cast consists of relatively unknown actors. The series' screenwriters include J. Dennis C Teodosio and Aye Kyi Tha Han.

== Cast and characters ==
- Myat Thu Kyaw as Nay Min Khant
- Soe Nandar Kyaw as Myat Noe Khin
- Wint Yamone Naing as Mar Yar Cho
- Kaung Myat San as Ye Naing
- Phone Shein Htet as Wunna
- Hsaung Wutyee May as Phyu Sin Shin Thant
- May Myint Mo as Nan Mo
- Pyay Phyo Aung as Lin Let
- Soe Moe Kyi as Daw Nan Tin May Khant
- Than Than Soe as Daw Myat Myat Khin
- Win Myaing as U Thiha
- Yan Kyaw as U Thant Khin
- Zaw Maing as U Dibba
- Hla Hla Win as Phwar Zar Yu
