= Where There is Love =

Burmese television series

- Burmese: ချစ်ခြင်းတရားတို့ရှိရာ
- Genre: Coming-of-Age; Romance; Drama
- Screenplay by: Aye Kyi Thar Han; Hsu Hsu Sabal Phu
- Directed by: Htut Tin Htun (ထွဋ်တင်ထွန်း)
- Starring: Kaung Myat San; Hsaung Wutyee May; Aung Paing; May Akari Htoo
- Composers: He' Lay; TheLionCityBoy
- Country of origin: Myanmar
- Original language: Burmese
- No. of episodes: 20

Production
- Executive producer: Khin Lay
- Producers: Naing Than; Pyone Maung Lwin
- Production locations: Myanmar; Singapore
- Cinematography: Alma Dela Peña
- Editors: Hnin Thandar Myo; Myat Hsu Hsu San
- Running time: 40 minutes Mondays to Fridays at 19:00 (MMT)
- Production companies: VisitSingapore; Forever Group

Original release
- Network: MRTV-4
- Release: 11 March – 8 April 2019

Where There is Love (Burmese: ချစ်ခြင်းတရားတို့ရှိရာ) is a 2019 Burmese coming-of-age romantic drama television series. It aired on MRTV-4, from March 11 to April 8, 2019, on Mondays to Fridays at 19:00 for 20 episodes.

The series features the theme song "Where There is Love" performed by He' Lay and TheLionCityBoy.
In addition to its finale, the series favors both happy and sad ending with two separate finale episodes, allowing the viewers to choose the fate they desired.

== Synopsis ==
After two high school rivals complete their senior year, their lives take them to separate paths, with one settling in Myanmar and the other studying abroad in Singapore. Growing up doesn’t come easy when family problems are involved, career another, no matter the wealth. However, fate brings them back together when they unexpectedly cross paths five years later. Now that their best friends’ wedding is approaching, the two frenemies are invited to spend time in Singapore and help out. With their lives now intertwined, the reluctant childhood friends becomes more involved with each other, unravelling vulnerability and understanding along the journey whilst their relationship blossom into something undeniable. Just as their rivalry comes to an end, things take a different turn when the world has other plans for them.

== Cast and Characters ==
=== Main ===
- Kaung Myat San as Myat Moe Swe, the son of wealthy business owners U Moe Zan and Daw Khin Swe Htike, and the grandson of A Phwar Nyein. He is an aspiring chef. Despite coming from a high-profile family, he often struggles under the guidance of his negligent and unsupportive parents.
- Hsaung Wutyee May as Thet Thet Zaw, the daughter of the renowned photographer U Myat Zaw and Daw May Thet. She is an aspiring photographer herself who later develops her own photography business under an anonymous online persona “Z Blogger”.
- Aung Paing as Lin Thuta, a hotel manager, roommate and co-worker of Myat Moe Swe who has a massive crush on Juliya. He later becomes her husband.
- May Akari Htoo as Juliya Oo, Thet Thet Zaw’s long-time best friend who becomes an interior designer after she moved to Singapore with her dad.

=== Supporting ===
- Phyo Yazar Naing as Zaw Htet, a fashion designer who was responsible for designing Lin Thuta and Juliya's wedding attire.
- Nay Yee Win Lai as Ya Min Khin, the daughter of a friend of Daw Khin Swe Htike and a good friend of Myat Moe Swe.
- Ye Aung as U Moe Zan, a business owner and father of Myat Moe Swe.
- Khin Zarchi Kyaw as Daw Khin Swe Htike, the mother of Myat Moe Swe who owns a jewellery shop.
- Cho Pyone as A Phwar Nyein, a loving grandmother and role model of Myat Moe Swe.
- Min Thu as U Myat Zaw, an inspiring photographer and father of Thet Thet Zaw.
- Su Htet Kaday as Daw May Thet, the mother of Thet Thet Zaw.
- Yan Kyaw as 'Daddy', a doctor and Juliya's father residing in Singapore.

== Episodes ==
No.	Directed by	Original release date	Length
1	Htut Tin Htun	March 11, 2019	33:40
Two high school rivals; Myat Moe Swe, an academically excellent boy often described as “perfect” by his classmates and Thet Thet Zaw, an overachiever girl with big ambitions, approach the end of their senior years but their rivalry is far from over. At lunch break, Myat Moe Swe pranks Thet Thet Zaw by attempting to scare her using a fake snake. They both wind up in the principal's office as a result, which intensifies their rivalry. At home, Myat Moe Swe enjoys cooking meals with his grandmother while Thet Thet Zaw admires her father's photo-editing skills. One day, Myat Moe Swe's father forgets to pick him up from school, leaving him standing by himself in the rain. This leads to his parents into an argument. Overhearing his parents conversation, the boy becomes distraught and causes him to withdraw from a speaking competition.
2	Htut Tin Htun	March 12, 2019	32:14
At school, Myat Moe Swe struggles to control his emotion and attacks a classmate who struck him with a soccer ball. At Thet Thet Zaw's house, she offers to tutor Juliya in mathematics. Together they spend the night preparing for the final. After the final high school examination is completed, the summer holidays quickly arrived. Thet Thet Zaw and her family go on a vacation across the country while Myat Moe Swe joins a summer culinary class.
3	Htut Tin Htun	March 13, 2019	33:00
During one of her visits to a pagoda, Thet Thet Zaw had an accident involving falling off the stairs and afterwards knocking into a mild coma. Fortunately, the injury is moderate. Meanwhile, in Yangon, Myat Moe Swe overhears the divorce conversation between his parents and felt betrayed upon learning their upcoming separation. Three months after following incidents, the result day arrives. Thet Thet Zaw and Juliya joyfully dash to the former’s home to inform her parents about their accomplishment. They all celebrate out of love and receive congratulations from her parents. However, for Myat Moe Swe, whose parents brag about his great achievements for their own pride and image, things take a different route. For greater chance of success in his future, his parents want him to pursue stereotypical and overrated career. But Myat Moe Swe chooses to become a chef, claiming that it brings him happiness that his parents could never provide, much of his parents’ dissatisfaction regarding losing their reputation.
4	Htut Tin Htun	March 14, 2019	35:08
Soon after the graduation ceremony, the students part ways; Myat Moe Swe goes to Singapore to study culinary studies, Juliya moves to the same country to live with her dad, unaware of her classmate’s presence and Thet Thet Zaw stays in Myanmar to study Photography and Filmmaking at a local media development center. Sometimes later, Thet Thet Zaw and her collage friends are preparing their final year project. In Singapore, Myat Moe Swe is promoted from waiter to assistant chef at his employment after impressing the head chef with his excellent cooking skills.
5	Htut Tin Htun	March 15, 2019	34:30
At the restaurant, Myat Moe Swe is praised by a special customer. Upon improving the restaurant's reputation after his exceptional performance, Myat Moe Swe is given the chance to work as a full-time chef in a hotel by the head chef. At the following location, he meets Lin Thuta, a coworker, and agrees to share a room with him after discovering that they are of the same nationality. In Yangon, Thet Thet Zaw graduates media school and receives her own digital camera. She creates a social media page and begins sharing her work online. Before long, five years have passed. Thet Thet Zaw is now a professional photographer and Myat Moe Swe is a head chef. Thet Thet Zaw talks to Juliya on the phone, who is now an interior designer, before Juliya is accidentally knock down by a man who happens to be Burmese as well.
6	Htut Tin Htun	March 18, 2019	33:08
Juliya arrives at a hotel to meet its manager who commissioned her to improve one of the office room. Upon arrival, she is shocked to discover that the manager is the same man she met at the MRT, who introduces himself as Lin Thuta. After the meeting, Lin Thuta admits to his best friend Myat Moe Swe that he may have develop a crush on her. In Yangon, Thet Thet Zaw deals with an unfriendly client while A Pwar Nyein grew sick. At late night, Myat Moe Swe begins debating with an online photographer Z Blogger.
7	Htut Tin Htun	March 19, 2019	33:58
Lin Thuta reaches out to Juliya and propose to take her to the zoo. At the zoo, when the two reaches the aquarium, Lin Thuta confessed his feelings to Juliya, who reveals to returns the same to him claiming it as the love at first sight. They hug and become an official couple. To express affection to his new girlfriend, Lin Thuta invites Juliya for dinner at his apartment. At dinner, Juliya and Myat Moe Swe unexpectedly reunite. The two were overjoyed and recall memories of their high school days. At home, Thet Thet Zaw begins to experience headache. Soon afterwards, her mother experiences a heart attack after discovering that she had been defrauded of a substantial sum of money. At the same time, Myat Moe Swe returns to Yangon at his father’s request and learns the tragic passing of A Pwar Nyein.
8	Htut Tin Htun	March 20, 2019	33:06
Myat Moe Swe grief for his late grandmother. The estranged family ultimately reconciles and ask their son to remain in Myanmar permanently while expressing their whole support for his passion. In the meantime, Thet Thet Zaw's business is dealing with an intrusive client. Juliya allows her father to meet her boyfriend and receives a proposal from Lin Thuta.
9	Htut Tin Htun	March 21, 2019	34:35
U Moe Zan and Daw Khin Swe Htike, the parents who were previously negligent purchase a building for their son to establish his own restaurant in hope to make up for their past mistakes. In Singapore, newly engaged couple Juliya and Lin Thuta start planning their wedding. Once the restaurant is set up, Myat Moe Swe appoints a skilled internet photographer named Z Blogger to capture photos for his restaurant advertisement, unaware that the person behind the page is his childhood academic nemesis. On the day of the photo session, the two rivals unpleasantly reunite.
10	Htut Tin Htun	March 22, 2019	32:36
At their reunion, Myat Moe Swe and Thet Thet Zaw get into their typical dispute, which led to Thet Thet Zaw declining to work alongside Myat Moe Swe. Finally experiencing his parents' sincerity, Myat Moe Swe agrees to reside in Myanmar permanently as a family. Before his permanent stay, he returns to Singapore to wrap up the necessary work he previously left behind. At the same time, Thet Thet Zaw arrives in Singapore to attend her best friend's wedding. When Myat Moe Swe learns about her visit, he hosts a dinner party to surprise Thet Thet Zaw of his presence.
11	Htut Tin Htun	March 25, 2019	34:12
Following the event at the dinner, Thet Thet Zaw loses a bet to Myat Moe Swe. As loser punishment, she is forced to cook daily meals for her opponent. The next day, Thet Thet Zaw assists Juliya with her pre-wedding photoshoot. They meet up with a fashion designer named Zaw Htet who seems to take an interest in Thet Thet Zaw. At the hotel, Lin Thuta is burdened with an urgent situation regarding an employee. As a result, he is unable to arrive for the photoshoot in time, leaving Juliya devastated and feels he has betrayed her love. When he returns, Juliya furiously turn down their marriage plan. Now, leaving both heartbroken, Lin Thuta reach out to Juliya's father to make amends with his fiancée, while Myat Moe Swe reminds the protective Thet Thet Zaw to not jump into conclusion about Lin Thuta's absence.
12	Htut Tin Htun	March 26, 2019	34:24
In attempt to reconcile the broken-up couples, Thet Thet Zaw and Myat Moe Swe plan a meet up at the hospital to dissolve the misunderstanding. After instantly rekindled, the couple begin their pre-wedding photoshoot. At some point in the studio, Lin Thuta gets tangled in wires and unintentionally knocks down the softbox light, almost hitting Myat Moe Swe but instead striking Thet Thet Zaw in the face, who rushed to protect him from getting hurt. At the hospital, Myat Moe Swe becomes highly concern about Thet Thet Zaw's well-being while she is in mild coma from the subsequent accident. The next day, Myat Moe Swe strangely arrives without notice at Juliya's apartment and begins to prepare a nutritious meal for Thet Thet Zaw so that she can heal more quickly. However, they are soon interrupted when Zaw Htet unexpectedly shows up to apologize for the following accident at his studio, making Myat Moe Swe envious of his presumptuous interaction. A few days later, the wedding day finally arrived, and the friends perform their assigned roles. After the wedding, the three friends spend their time taking Thet Thet Zaw around the city's attractions before her departure. As the night falls, Myat Moe Swe insists on assisting Thet Thet Zaw relocate into a hotel and requests a coffee date, but he becomes irritated when he learns that she has a meeting with Zaw Htet.
13	Htut Tin Htun	March 27, 2019	34:20
Frustrated, Myat Moe Swe is distracted upon learning about Thet Thet Zaw and Zaw Htet's meeting. On the phone, he demands Thet Thet Zaw to cancel the meeting so they can meet but Thet Thet Zaw does not want to impose Zaw Htet's apology and dismiss Myat Moe Swe's request. At the meeting, Thet Thet Zaw receives a confession from Zaw Htet. Later that night after the meeting, Thet Thet Zaw returns to the hotel to find Myat Moe Swe bickering over his concern about her traveling alone at night. The next morning, the four best friends meet up in the ally way but Lin Thuta's sudden stomachache causes them to split up shortly after, leaving the two frenemies alone. Myat Moe Swe later jokingly reveals that the couple deliberately left them to spend time alone and offers to take Thet Thet Zaw to destinations, leaving her skeptical but she still consented to join him. Afterwards, the two spend the day visiting photogenic exhibits and the time throughout the course of the day brings them closer together, gradually forgetting about their former hostility. At their final stop, Thet Thet Zaw reveals to agree on reaccepting Myat Moe Swe's business proposal as an act of conciliation. One month later, the couple celebrate their first anniversary while Myat Moe Swe wraps up his necessary works and prepares to leave for Yangon.
