= Toh Ma Ma Nae Toh =

Burmese television series

- Official poster
- Burmese: တို့မမနဲ့တို့
- Genre: Comedy drama
- Screenplay by: Thandar Wai; Zay Htet Kaung
- Directed by: Thein Han
- Starring: Hein Min Thu; Myat Thu Thu; Moe Thura; So Pyay Myint; Shin Min Set
- Opening theme: Chit Loon Loh (ချစ်လွန်းလို့)
- Ending theme: Chit Loon Loh (ချစ်လွန်းလို့)
- Composer: Soe Lin (စိုးလင်း)
- Country of origin: Myanmar
- Original language: Burmese
- No. of episodes: 46

Production
- Executive producer: Khin Lay
- Producers: Naing Than; Khun Mai Aung
- Production location: Myanmar
- Cinematography: Banyar Maung
- Editors: May Oo Myint; Khin La Pyae Win
- Running time: 40 minutes Mondays to Fridays at 19:00 (MMT)
- Production company: Niyyayana Production

Original release
- Network: MRTV-4
- Release: 31 July – 2 October 2020

Toh Ma Ma Nae Toh (Burmese: တို့မမနဲ့တို့) is a 2020 Burmese comedy-drama television series. It aired on MRTV-4, from 31 July to 2 October 2020, on Mondays to Fridays at 19:00 for 46 episodes.

== Synopsis ==
A couple in a lavender marriage deals with the chaos of shared lives, complicated family dynamics, individual careers, and the occasional catastrophe, all while keeping a secret from everyone else.

== Cast ==
- Myat Thu Thu as Than Than Swe
- Hein Min Thu as Than Dana
- Moe Thura as Sit Paing
- Shin Min Set as Khin Thandar Po
- So Pyay Myint as Chit San Maung
- Nyi Nanda as U Thura
- Myo Sandi Kyaw as Daw Khin Dana
- Thet Oo Ko as Than Win Maung
- Zin Cho Khine Oo as Phyu Thel
- Sharr as Nga Mway Htoe
