= Su Taung =

2022 Burmese television series

- Poster
- Burmese: ဆုတောင်း
- Genre: Comedy
- Screenplay by: Htet Myat Naing Zin; Thuretthawah
- Directed by: Win Htut Oo
- Starring: Wai Yan Lin; Phone Shein Khant; So Pyay Myint; Kaung Sit Thway; Min Zay; La Pyae; Phyo Yazar Naing; Saw Min Yar; Hsaung Wutyee May; Han Na Lar; Zu Zu Zan; Nant Chit Nadi Zaw; Hsu Sandi Yoon; Moe Ma Kha May; Sharr; Eaint Kyi Phyu; La Won Thit
- Theme music composer: TMhi
- Country of origin: Myanmar
- Original language: Burmese
- No. of episodes: 21

Production
- Executive producer: Khin Lay
- Producers: Naing Than; Pyone Maung
- Production location: Myanmar
- Editor: Su Myat Hlaing
- Running time: 40 minutes Mondays to Fridays at 19:00 (MMT)
- Production company: Forever Group

Original release
- Network: MRTV-4
- Release: March 22 – April 19, 2022

Hsu Taung (Burmese: ဆုတောင်း) is a 2022 Burmese comedy television series. It aired on MRTV-4, from March 22 to April 19, 2022, on Mondays to Fridays at 19:00 for 21 episodes.

== Synopsis ==
It is a comedy series based on the traditions of the village.

== Cast ==
- Wai Yan Lin as Hla Swe
- Phone Shein Khant as Ko Kyi
- So Pyay Myint as Maung Lone
- Kaung Sit Thway as Maung Phone
- Hsaung Wutyee May as Sandar Kyaw
- Nant Chit Nadi Zaw as Thandar Kyaw
- Han Na Lar as Ma Pauk Sa
- Zu Zu Zan as Aye Mya Sandar
- Hsu Sandi Yoon as Mi Swar
- Moe Ma Kha May as Me Kha
- Sharr as Ingyin
- Saw Min Yar as Nagapyan Maung Thaing
- Min Thu as U Kyaw Ye Yint
- Gawzila as U Kyauk Doe
- Nyaung Nyaung
- Nga Pyaw Kyaw
- Min Zay as Lu Aye
- Phyo Yazar Naing as Gun seller leader
- Eaint Kyi Phyu as Salad Seller
- La Won Thit as Patient's sister
