= Yadanar Htae Ka Yadanar =

Burmese television series

- Burmese: ရတနာထဲကရတနာ
- Genre: Fantasy; Drama
- Screenplay by: Aung Nay Ko Ko; Hsu Hsu Sabal Phoo
- Directed by: Roongravee Maneeprem
- Starring: Aung Min Khant; Myat Thu Thu; Kaung Myat San
- Opening theme: Than Tha Yar A Khan Set Myar
- Ending theme: Than Tha Yar A Khan Set Myar
- Country of origin: Myanmar
- Original language: Burmese
- No. of episodes: 40

Production
- Executive producers: Mr.Brian L.Marcar; Khin Lay
- Producers: Naing Than; Soe Thura
- Production location: Myanmar
- Editors: Su Myat Hlaing; Ei Hnin Wai
- Running time: 30 minutes Mondays to Fridays at 19:15 (MMT)
- Production company: Forever Bec-Tero

Original release
- Network: MRTV-4
- Release: 30 January – 24 March 2017

Yadanar Htae Ka Yadanar (Burmese: ရတနာထဲကရတနာ; lit. 'Treasure Among Treasure') is a 2017 Burmese supernatural drama television series based on Burmese mythology. It aired on MRTV-4, from January 30 to March 24, 2017, on Mondays to Fridays at 19:00 for 40 episodes.

== Synopsis ==
I've never been here ... but in my head, it felt so familiar to me...

A Dragon King and a Dragon Queen were playing happily in a long and beautiful river that existed thousands of years ago. The Dragon King also helped in the battle, and the Dragon King died in great pain due to the attack of Garuda King. Before the Dragon King's death, with the Dragon King's curse, he vomited blood three times from his mouth and turned into jewels. The story begins with the wrath of the Dragon Queen, who witnessed the tragedy.

Knowing that the Dragon King and the Garuda King were successful businessmen at this time, the Dragon Queen longed to be reunited with her lover. The story of Yadanar Htae Ka Yadanar became a story set in the pursuit of humanity with the intention of seeking revenge with resentment.

== Cast ==
=== Main cast ===
- Aung Min Khant as Nay Thura, the Dragon King's human form and reincarnation
- Myat Thu Thu as La Yake Nwe, the Dragon Queen's human form
- Kaung Myat San as Aung Thakhin, the Garuda King's human form and reincarnation

=== Supporting ===
- So Pyay Myint as Min Yan, a police officer, best friend of Nay Thura and boyfriend of Su Waddy.
- Phyo Than Thar Cho as Amara, a troublesome friend of Nay Thura who has an obsessive crush on him.
- Wyne Shwe Yi as Su Waddy, a kind-hearted younger half-sister of Aung Thakhin who also holds beliefs to supernatural just like her father.
- Kaung Sitt Thway as Ye Yint, Aung Thakhin's highly devoted accomplice and bodyguard.
- Thun Thitsar Zaw as Ma Eain, short for Eain Pyae Wah, a loyal minion to the Dragon Queen who could transform herself into a snake.
- Su Hlaing Hnin as Daw Ni Ni Khaing, arrogant mother of Amara with the same attitude as her daughter.
- Phu Sone as Daw Kalayar Phyu, overprotective mother of Nay Thura and La Min who is trying her best to keep her family together.
- Ye Aung as U Myat Hein, Nay Thura's uncle, Daw Kalayar Phyu's older brother and the owner of the Golden Dragon Company.
- Zin Myo as U Myint Myat, Su Waddy's superstitious father and an ally to the Dragon Queen.
- Kyaw Thet Wai as Dutah the grim reaper, a good friend of the Dragon Queen.
- May Pyae Sone Lin as La Min Phyu, Nay Thura's younger sister and the only daughter of Daw Kalayar.
