= 101% Love =

Burmese television series

- Poster
- Burmese: ၁၀၁%အချစ်
- Genre: Romance; Drama
- Screenplay by: Yoon Thakhin
- Story by: Thein Han (Phoenix)
- Directed by: Thein Han (Phoenix)
- Starring: Yan Aung; Khin Zarchi Kyaw; Htoo Mon; Kaung Myat San; Hsaung Wutyee May; Moe Thura; Kaung Htet Thar; Su Htet Hlaing; Su Mon; Moe Thadar
- Country of origin: Myanmar
- Original language: Burmese
- No. of episodes: 35

Production
- Production location: Myanmar
- Cinematography: Moe Zaw; Ye Min Paing
- Editors: Za; Ayoe
- Running time: 45 minutes
- Production company: Silver Egg Post Production

Original release
- Network: MRTV-4
- Release: 3 November – 21 December 2022

101% Love (Burmese: ၁၀၁%အချစ်) is a 2022 Burmese romantic-drama television series. It aired on MRTV-4, from November 3 to December 21, 2022, on Mondays to Fridays at 19:00 for 35 episodes.

== Plot ==
In Mandalay, Phoe Thar is mesmerized by the sound of a violin and followed the melody to find a girl named Moe Ni playing the violin. Interested in becoming friends, he introduced himself to the girl, hoping to start a conversation but found out that Moe Ni's grandfather was dying. After learning that Moe Ni does not have any family members supporting her life, Phoe Thar wanted to take her to Yangon for a better future. However, Phoe Thar was separated from Moe Ni. When Phoe Thar came of age, he found out that Moe Ni's father, who previously abandoned her, had taken her to Yangon. Determined to reunite with her, Phoe Thar, whose real name is Shwe Thway, searched for Moe Ni until he reaches adulthood. After more than ten years passed, Shwe Thway finally meets Moe Ni again, and learned that her name is Khin Pyae Sone. Khin Pyae Sone lives with her three strict brothers and an aunt. After learning each others identities, Shwe Thway and Khin Pyae Sone became lovers. At first, her three brothers did not approve the marriage of the couple. One day, she ran away with Shwe Thway, and when Khin Pyae Sone was pregnant, her brothers accepted her back. Meanwhile, U Soe Moe, father of Shwe Thway, also had a story from his childhood. Soe Moe loved Angela, but Angela did not accept his love. Cynthia loves Soe Moe, but Soe Moe only loves Angela. Angela said that she loves Cynthia's younger brother Steven in front of Soe Moe. However, Soe Moe did not give up. Soe Moe's parents and Angela's parents agreed and prepared to marry Soe Moe and Angela. Before getting married, Cynthia took Angela out to run away with Steven. Steven died in a car accident on the road. Soe Moe and Angela got married. Cynthia says that her younger brother's death was caused by Soe Moe, and she keeps it dark until she is old.

In the end, the series indicates a moral message that the consequences of adoring someone more than a full percentage may result in the other person feeling trapped by the overloaded love and care.

== Cast ==
- Kaung Myat San as Shwe Thway, an only child of U Soe Moe and Angela. During his teen years, he is nicknamed as Phoe Thar. He is married to Khin Pyae Sone.
- Hsaung Wutyee May as Khin Pyae Sone, also known as Moe Ni, an orphan girl and a beloved niece of Daw Khin Ma Ma. She is married to Shwe Thawy.
- Yan Aung as U Soe Moe, single father of Shwe Thawy who is carrying the burden of a dark secret regarding the death of his wife.
- Khin Zarchi Kyaw as Daw Khin Ma Ma, loving aunt of Khin Pyae Sone who often acts as her mother figure.
- Htoo Mon as Daw Cynthia, a friend of Daw Khin Ma Ma with a dark past intertwined with U Soe Moe.
- Moe Thura as young adult Soe Moe
- Kaung Htet Thar as Steven, younger brother of Cynthia.
- Su Htet Hlaing as young adult Cynthia
- Su Mon as Angela, late mother of Shwe Thway.
- Moe Thadar as Moe Thadar, a kind-hearted young woman seen by U Soe Moe as his benefactor.
- Shinn Myat as Ko Lay, youngest half-brother of Khin Pyae Sone.
- Soe Htun Win as Ko Gyi, oldest half-brother of Khin Pyae Sone who is extremely overprotective of his sibilings.
- Min Zay as Ko Latt, middle half-brother of Khin Pyae Sone who is in love with Moe Thader.
- Shine Zay as Alinkar, a wise nephew of Daw Cynthia and a brother figure to Khin Pyae Sone.
