= Myetlone Mhar Alwan Nhotekhan Mhar Marna =

Burmese television series

- poster
- Burmese: မျက်လုံးမှာအလွမ်းနှုတ်ခမ်းမှာမာန
- Genre: Drama
- Based on: Myetlone Mhar Alwan Nhotekhan Mhar Marna by Le Dwin Thar Saw Chit
- Screenplay by: Naing Ko Ko; San San Yin
- Directed by: Pyi Thit Naing
- Starring: Aung Min Khant; Nay Chi Shoon Lak; Htet Myat; Wyne Shwe Yi
- Theme music composer: Za War (ဇဝါ)
- Opening theme: Myetlone Mhar Alwan Nhotekhan Mhar Marna by Htun Naung Sint and Jen Jeng
- Ending theme: Htoo Hsan Dae A Chit Gabar by Htun Naung Sint and Jen Jeng
- Country of origin: Myanmar
- Original language: Burmese
- No. of episodes: 28

Production
- Executive producer: Khin Lay
- Producers: Naing Than; Khun Mai Aung
- Production location: Myanmar
- Editor: Cho Cho Myint
- Running time: 40 minutes Mondays to Fridays at 19:00 (MMT)
- Production company: Niyyayana Production

Original release
- Network: MRTV-4
- Release: 9 May – 17 June 2019

Myetlone Mhar Alwan Nhotekhan Mhar Marna (Burmese: မျက်လုံးမှာအလွမ်းနှုတ်ခမ်းမှာမာန, lit. 'Longing on eyes, pride on lips') is a 2019 Burmese drama television series. It aired on MRTV-4, from May 9 to June 17, 2019, on Mondays to Fridays at 19:00 for 28 episodes.

== Cast ==
=== Main ===
- Aung Min Khant as Aung Mhann
- Nay Chi Shoon Lak as Hnin Nway
- Htet Myat as Ko Nyunt Aye
- Wyne Shwe Yi as Swe Swe Kyaw, wife of Ko Nyunt Aye

=== Supporting ===
- Kaung Sett Naing as Ko Than Lwin
- Phyo Yazar Naing as Mg Myint
- Zin Wine as U Kyaw Dunn, father of Swe Swe Kyaw
- Nyi Nanda as U Aung Baw
- Great Chan as Nwe Nwe, elder sister of Hnin Nway
- Phyo Than Thar Cho as Wutyi
- Khine Hnin Wai as Daw Hnin Yee, mother of Hnin Nway
- Pwint Nadi Maung as wife of U Aung Baw
- Goon Pone Gyi as Daw Gyi Tin
