= Tharaphu =

2022 Burmese television series

- Poster
- Burmese: သရဖူ
- Genre: Drama
- Based on: Tharaphu by Khin Hnin Yu
- Screenplay by: Kyaw Kyaw Htun; San San Yin
- Directed by: Htet Naung Htun
- Starring: Kyaw Hsu; Kaung Sett Naing; Chue Lay; Than Thar Nyi; Aung Paing; Moe Thura; Moe Thiri Htet; Nay Yee Win Lai; Zin Wine; Soe Myat Thuzar
- Theme music composer: Shein Aung; Aung Min Hein
- Country of origin: Myanmar
- Original language: Burmese
- No. of episodes: 31

Production
- Executive producer: Khin Lay
- Producers: Naing Than; Nyi Nyi Naing
- Production location: Myanmar
- Cinematography: Kaung Myat San
- Editors: Hnin Nway Oo Hlaing; Zin Min Phyo
- Running time: 40 minutes Mondays to Fridays at 19:00 (MMT)
- Production company: Forever Group

Original release
- Network: MRTV-4
- Release: April 20 – June 1, 2022

Tharaphu (Burmese: သရဖူ) is a 2022 Burmese drama television series directed by Htut Naung Htun starring Kyaw Hsu, Chue Lay, Soe Myat Thuzar and Than Thar Nyi. It is an adaptation of the novel "Tharaphu" by Khin Hnin Yu. It aired on MRTV-4, from April 20 to June 1, 2022, on Mondays to Fridays at 19:00 for 31 episodes.

== Synopsis ==
Aye followed her husband from Pyay. Aye who will be subjected to various kinds of oppression by her mother-in-law. When her sister-in-law, Rosie, had an affair with her boyfriend and became pregnant. Aye's mother-in-law decided to pretend to be Aye's baby. At that time, Aye's husband was abroad. Rosie came to Rangoon after giving birth. Rosie's mother told this child is not Rosie's child, this is Aye's child. Aye cannot surpass her mother-in-law's and she had to take care of her daughter-in-law's child like her child.When her husband returned, she could not bear the accusation and returned to her parents. Finally, Rosie explained everything to her brother and her husband. Aye's selfish mother-in-law gave up.

== Cast ==
- Kyaw Hsu as Soe Aung
- Kaung Sett Naing as Kyaw Zan
- Chue Lay as Aye
- Than Thar Nyi as Rosie
- Nan Sandar Hla Htun as Win Mar
- Zin Wine as U Ba Swe
- Soe Myat Thuzar as Daw Sein Shwe Sint
- Aung Paing as Mya Han
- Moe Thura as Leo Maung Maung
- Moe Thiri Htet as Ma Thet
- Nay Yee Win Lai as Devi Htun Kyaw
- Great Chan as Khwar Nyo
- Khun Seng as Thet Htun
- Ingyin Htoo as Khet Khet Wai
