= Pyaw Shwin Chin Wit Nyin =

Burmese television series

- Poster
- Burmese: ပျော်ရွှင်ခြင်းဝိညာဉ်
- Genre: Comedy-horror
- Screenplay by: Aung Nay Ko Ko; Aye Pa Pa Min
- Directed by: Thapthep Paprach
- Starring: Kyaw Hsu; Wint Yamone Naing; Thi Ha; Thun Thitsar Zaw; Shwe Sin Wint Shein
- Theme music composer: A Yoe
- Country of origin: Myanmar
- Original language: Burmese
- No. of episodes: 21

Production
- Executive producers: Brian L.Marcar; Khin Lay
- Producers: Naing Than; Nyi Nyi Naing
- Production location: Myanmar
- Editors: Myat Hsu Hsu San; Yu Yu Lwin; Thazin Moe
- Running time: 40 minutes Mondays to Fridays at 19:00 (MMT)

Original release
- Network: MRTV-4
- Release: 14 June – 12 July 2018

Pyaw Shwin Chin Wit Nyin (Burmese: ပျော်ရွှင်ခြင်းဝိညာဉ်) is a 2018 Burmese comedy-horror television series. It aired on MRTV-4, from June 14 to July 12, 2018, on Mondays to Fridays at 19:00 for 21 episodes.

== Cast ==
- Kyaw Hsu as Ye Naung
- Wint Yamone Naing as May Shar San
- Thi Ha as Lin Let
- Kyaw Soe as Dipar (Ghost#1)
- Thun Thitsar Zaw as Yamin
- Zaw Htet as Htun Htun
- Shwe Sin Wint Shein as Shin Thant Phyu
- Zin Myo as Thet Min
- Tayzar Kyaw as Chan Myae
- Nay Lin as Aung Aung (Ghost#2)
- Shwe Eain Min as Wutyi Oo (Ghost#3)
- Pan Thee as Win Htut (Ghost#4)
- Ye Lay Ma as Ma Gyi Soe
- Thaw Phone Sett (child actor) as Baby Ghost
