= Legends of Warriors =

Burmese television series

- Burmese: တစစ်တမက် ကိုယ်နှင့်သက်ကို
- Genre: Military; Drama
- Directed by: Tin Aung Soe
- Starring: Zin Wine; Ye Aung; Yan Kyaw; Khant Sithu; Aung Yay Chan; Kyaw Hsu; Tyron Bejay; Thi Ha; Nay Myo Aung; Min Htet Kyaw Zin; Min Yazar; Soe Myat Thuzar; May Thinzar Oo; May Myint Mo; Yin Let; Khaing Thazin Ngu Wah
- Country of origin: Myanmar
- Original language: Burmese
- No. of episodes: 13

Production
- Producers: Lieutenant Colonel Aung Kyaw Moe; U Thein Htun Aung (Niyyayana production); Pyae Phyo Han (Forever Group)
- Production location: Myanmar
- Running time: 40 minutes
- Production companies: Niyyayana Production; Forever Group

Original release
- Network: MRTV-4; MWD
- Release: 4 March – 27 March 2020

Legends of Warriors (Burmese: တစစ်တမက် ကိုယ်နှင့်သက်ကို) is a 2020 Burmese military-drama miniseries. Directed by Tin Aung Soe, the series served to commemorate the 75th Myanmar Armed Forces Day on 27 March 2020, airing on MRTV-4 for 13 episodes from 4 to 27 March.

The series was heavily marketed prior to its broadcast.

== Cast ==
- Zin Wine as TOC commander
- Ye Aung as U Thaung Tan
- Yan Kyaw as U Phay Khin
- Tyron Bejay as Phay Khin, young life of U Phay Khin
- Khant Sithu as Captain Myint Lwin from No. 11 Infantry Regiment (Kha La Ya-11)
- Aung Yay Chan as Major Ye Lwin
- Kyaw Hsu as Corporal Thet Lwin
- Thi Ha as Captain Oakkar
- Nay Myo Aung as Lieutenant Kyaw Yin
- Min Htet Kyaw Zin as Pilot Major Myint Thein
- Min Yazar as Sergeant Myo Aye
- Soe Myat Thuzar as Daw Hla Myint
- May Thinzar Oo as Daw Aye Hla
- May Myint Mo as Dr. Yee Mon
- Yin Let as Naw Lay Phaw, a nurse of Karen ethnicity
- Khaing Thazin Ngu Wah as Sergeant Aye Mya Thu
