= University of Distance Education, Mandalay =

Distance education system in Myanmar

Coordinates: 21°58′14.1″N 96°05′00.7″E

- အဝေးသင် တက္ကသိုလ် (မန္တလေး)
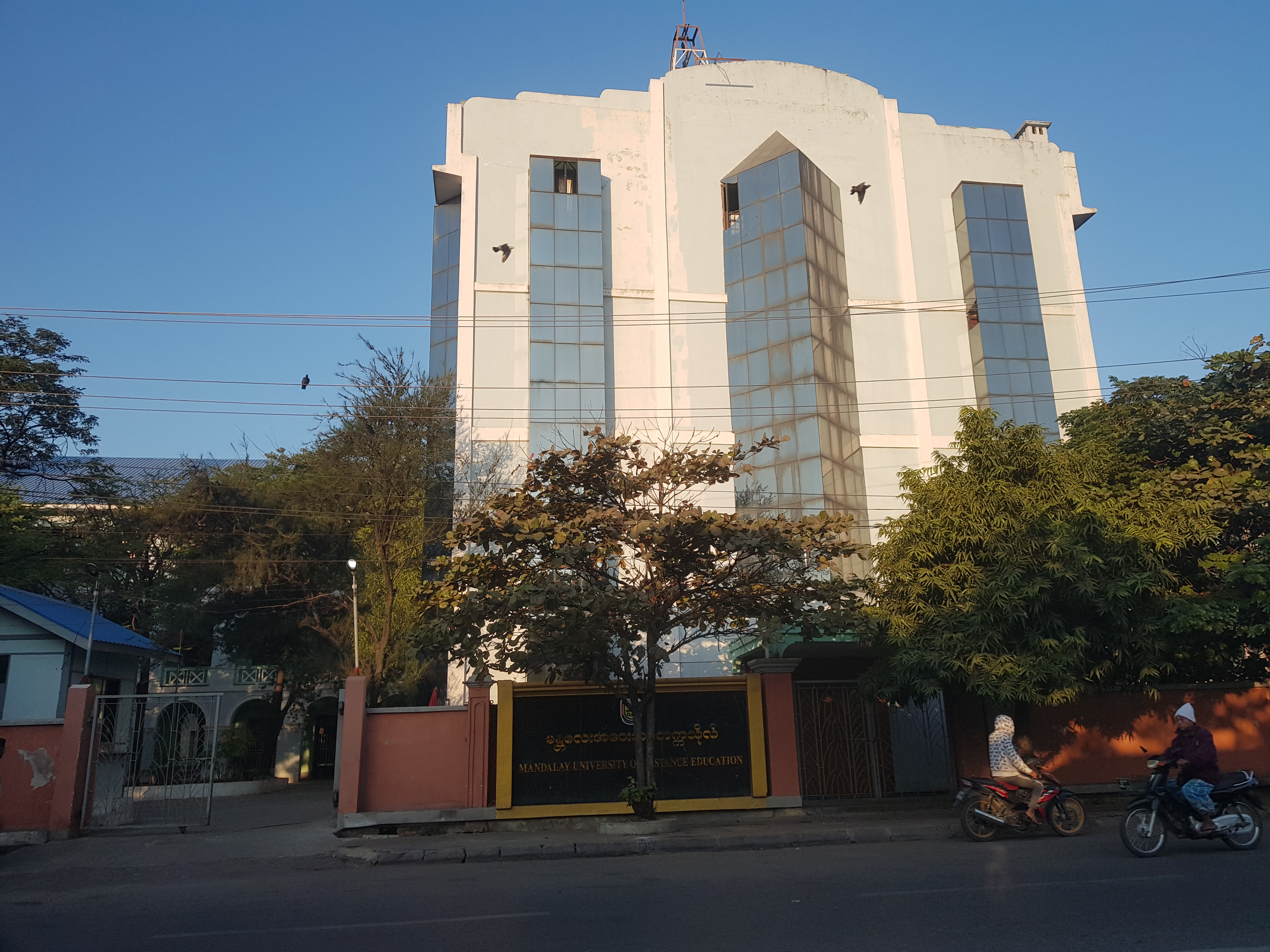
- Motto: ပညာလို အိုသည်မရှိ
- Motto in English: Never too old to learn
- Type: public
- Established: 1998; 28 years ago
- Rector: Khin Aye Aye
- Location: Mandalay, Myanmar
- Website: www.mude.edu.mm

The University of Distance Education, Mandalay (Burmese: အဝေးသင် တက္ကသိုလ် (မန္တလေး), pronounced [ʔəwéθɪ̀ɰ̃ tɛʔkəθò (máɰ̃dəlé)]), located in Mandalay, is one of two universities under the University of Distance Education system in Myanmar. With over 500,000 students mostly studying liberal arts and economics, the UDE system is the largest university in Myanmar. The Mandalay university serves distance education students in Upper Myanmar whereas the University of Distance Education, Yangon serves Lower Myanmar.

== History ==
The University of Distance Education system was established in July 1992 in Yangon. In 1998, the University of Distance Education, Mandalay was founded to serve Upper Myanmar. The Mandalay university handles 18 of the 32 campuses of the UDE system. The UDE's popularity has consistently increased. The enrollment in the university increased from over 38,000 in academic year 1987–88 to over 560,000 students in 2001–02.

Reflecting the country's low Internet penetration rates, the primary method of communication between the students and faculty is still by regular mail. Lectures for popular majors like economics and sciences are regularly broadcast over the country's Intranet available in over 700 e-Learning Centers throughout the country.

== Programs ==
The UDE offers 19 subjects, including economics, law and five science subjects. Economics and related subjects of Public Policy, Business Management and Home Economics attract most students.

== Campuses ==
In addition to its main campus in Mandalay, the university maintains branches in the following cities.

- Bhamo
- Kalay
- Kyaingtong
- Kyaukse
- Lashio
- Loikaw
- Magway
- Meiktila
- Mohnyin
- Monywa
- Myitkyina
- Pakkoku
- Panglong
- Shwebo
- Taunggyi
- Yenangyaung
- Myingyan
