= Aung Ko Latt =

Burmese director, musician

- Born: 10 January 1954 (age 72); Yangon, Myanmar
- Occupations: CEO of Aung Ko Latt Motion Pictures; Director, Cinematographer, Producer, Musician
- Notable work: Kayan Beauties; The Sun, The Moon and The Truth

Aung Ko Latt (Burmese: အောင်ကိုလတ်; born 10 January 1954), also known as James Patrick, is a Burmese director, cinematographer, storyboard artist and musician. He is the CEO of Aung Ko Latt Motion Pictures.

== Career ==
After having lived in Japan in the late 1980s and early 1990s, Aung Ko Latt returned to Myanmar to shoot TV commercials. He was the first director in Myanmar to create concept-driven advertising rather than basic product promotions.

In 2012 he storyboarded, directed, produced, and shot the feature film Kayan Beauties (Kayan Ahla in Myanmar), which was the first film in Myanmar to be shot using HD technology. It was also the first film to use the Dolby Digital Surround EX sound system.

The film won the Special Jury Award at the ASEAN International Film Festival (AIFFA) and Awards in Kuching, Malaysia in March 2013, on the back of two nominations: Best Director of Photography (Aung Ko Latt) and Best Supporting Actress (Rose Mary).

On December 29, 2013, Aung Ko Latt won the Best Cinematography Award for Kayan Beauties at the 56th Annual Myanmar Academy Awards ceremonies. The film also won the Award for Best Sound.

In 2015, Aung Ko Latt directed the eight-part television series, The Sun, The Moon and The Truth about real-life legal cases concerning land rights, industrial relations, human trafficking, defamation, wrongful dismissal and fraud in Myanmar. He co-produced the series through his company Aung Ko Latt Motion Pictures.

== Filmography ==
=== Films ===
- Kayan Beauties (2012)
- Gandaba: Strings of a Broken Harp (2020)

=== TV shows ===
He was involved as a Judge in Myanmar Idol Season 4 (2019).

- The Sun, The Moon and The Truth (2015)

== Personal life ==
Aung Ko Latt was married to Tin Moe Khaing (Julie Conway), a His son J-Me is a prominent rapper in Myanmar.
