= Winkabar San Eain =

Burmese television series

- Burmese: ဝင်္ကပါစံအိမ်
- Genre: Drama
- Directed by: Roongravee Maneeprem
- Starring: Aung Min Khant; Aung Yay Chan; Phone Shein Khant; Zin Myo; Poe Kyar Phyu Khin; Myat Thu Thu; Hsaung Wutyee May; Shwe Eain Min; Khine Hnin Wai; Phu Sone
- Theme music composer: Za Wah (ဇဝါ)
- Country of origin: Myanmar
- Original language: Burmese
- No. of episodes: 40

Production
- Executive producers: Brian L.Marcar; Khin Lay
- Producers: Naing Than; Soe Thura
- Production location: Myanmar
- Running time: 40 minutes Mondays to Fridays at 19:30 (MMT)
- Production company: Forever Bec-Tero

Original release
- Network: MRTV-4
- Release: 23 November 2015 – 19 January 2016

Winkabar San Eain (Burmese: ဝင်္ကပါစံအိမ်; lit. 'The Labyrinth House'), also known as Dark Castle, is a Burmese drama television series. It aired on MRTV-4, from November 23, 2015 to January 19, 2016, on Mondays to Fridays at 19:30 for 40 episodes.

== Synopsis ==
When a woman from an upper-class family runs away from home after her mother remarries, she ends up in a mansion full of secrets located on a hilltop town, where she finds true love along with complicated domestic problems.

== Cast ==
- Aung Min Khant as Sao Khun Hmaing
- Aung Yay Chan as Sai San
- Phone Shein Khant as Nay Ba La
- Zin Myo as U Gyi Aung
- Poe Kyar Phyu Khin as Mabel Mari Myint
- Myat Thu Thu as Khan Mon
- Hsaung Wutyee May as Saw Kalyar
- Shwe Eain Min as Nan Shwe Phoo, Nan Kyar (dual role)
- Khine Hnin Wai as Daw Mya Thet Wai
- Phu Sone as Daw Shwe Nu Yin
