= Taungoo University =

University in Taungoo, Myanmar

Coordinates: 18°57′04″N 96°21′53″E

University of Taungoo
- တောင်ငူတက္ကသိုလ်
- Motto: ပညာဝေစည် ကေတုမတီ
- Type: Public
- Established: 2001; 25 years ago
- Rector: Dr Tin Tun
- Location: Near Nyaunggine Village, Taungoo; Bago Region, Myanmar
- Website: taungoouniversity.moe.edu.mm

Taungoo University or the University of Taungoo (Burmese: တောင်ငူတက္ကသိုလ်) is a public liberal arts university, located near Nyaunggine Village in Taungoo, Bago Division, Myanmar. The university mainly offers bachelor's and master's degree programs in liberal arts and sciences, and law, mostly to students from the Taungoo District and its vicinity.

== Programs ==
Classified as an Arts and Science university in the Burmese university education system, Taungoo University offers bachelor's and master's degree programs in common liberal arts and sciences disciplines. Its regular Bachelor of Arts (BA) and Bachelor of Science (BSc) degrees take four years to complete and honors degree programs (BA (Hons) and BSc (Hons)) and the law program take five years. The master's degree programs take two years.

Program	Bachelor's	Master's	Doctorate
Burmese	BA	MA	
English	BA	MA	
Geography	BA	MA	
History	BA	MA	
Philosophy	BA	MA	
Psychology	BA	MA	
Botany	BSc	MSc	
Chemistry	BSc	MSc	
Mathematics	BSc	MSc	
Physics	BSc	MSc	
Zoology	BSc	MSc	
Economics	BEcon		
Law	LLB		

== Departments ==
- Department of Mathematics
- Department of Physics
- Department of Chemistry
- Department of Zoology
- Department of Botany
- Department of Law
- Department of English
- Department of Burmese
- Department of History
- Department of Philosophy
- Department of Psychology
- Department of Geology
- Department of Oriental Studies
- Department of Geography

== Campus ==
- Arts Building
- Convocation Hall
- Recreation Centre
- Science Building
- Health Center
