= Myat Thu Thu =

Burmese television actress, model and singer

- မြတ်သူသူ
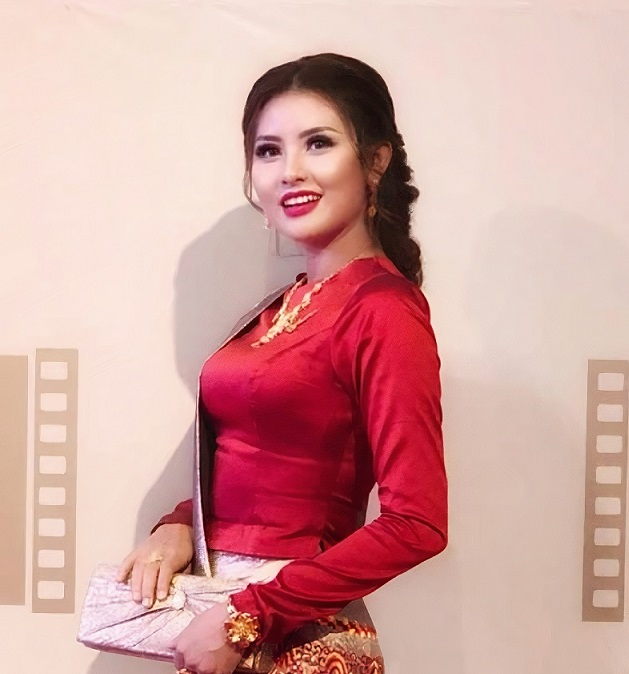
- Myat Thu Thu in 2018 at the Myanmar Academy Awards Ceremony
- Born: Moe Moe Myat Zin; 14 June 1990 (age 35); Yangon, Myanmar
- Education: Dagon University
- Occupations: Actress, model, singer
- Years active: 2014–present
- Height: 165 cm (5 ft 5 in)

Myat Thu Thu (Burmese: မြတ်သူသူ; born Moe Moe Myat Zin 14 June 1990), formerly known as Myat Thu Thu Zin (မြတ်သူသူဇင်) is a Burmese television actress, model and singer. She is best known for her roles in several MRTV-4 series and become popular among the audience with the series Winkabar San Eain (2015), Yadanar Htae Ka Yadanar (2017), Pyar Yay Aine (2019) and Tatiya Myaut Sone Mat (2019).

== Early life and education ==
Myat Thu Thu was born on 14 June 1990 in Yangon. She is the eldest child among four siblings, having two younger sisters and a younger brother. She attended high school at Basic Education High School No. 4 Mayangone and graduated from Dagon University with a degree in Maths.

== Career ==
In 2012, she attended the acting training class, Sarkawar. In 2013, she competed in model contests and having won the title awards such as Miss Gamone Pwint and Miss Now How 2013 second runner-up award. She then enrolled in the audition of casting for the drama Forever Mandalay which is produced by Forever Group and she was finally chosen from among almost 100 new talents for her role as Mar Lar in the drama. She then starred in her second series Flowers and Butterflies, which aired on MRTV-4 in 2014. Then she played the supporting roles in several series; Happy Beach (Season 1 and 2), The Sign of Love as a Book 2, and Pan Nu Thway.

In 2015, she played a villain in the horror drama Wit Nyin Shite Than, alongside Aung Min Khant, Han Lin Thant, May Me Kyaw Kyaw, Hsaung Wutyee May and Khin Sandar Myint. After airing the series on MRTV-4, which led to increasing popularity for her, even though she acted in a villain character. She then starred the main role in the drama Wingabar San Aein, alongside Aung Min Khant, Phone Shein Htet, Aung Yay Chan, Poe Kyar Phyu Khin, and Saung Wutyee May. Her portrayal of the character Kham Mon earned praised by fans for her acting performance and character interpretation and experienced a resurgence of popularity.

She then made her big-screen debut with Hna York Ta Bawa where he played the supporting role, which screened in Myanmar cinemas on 9 December 2016. In 2017, she portrayed the female lead in popular historical series Yadanar Htae Ka Yadanar alongside Aung Min Khant and Kaung Myat San, aired on MRTV-4 in February 2017 which was a huge commercial success, topping television ratings and becoming the most-watched Burmese television drama at that time. She gains increased popularity again with her role as Mya Nyo in the hit drama Pyar Yay Aine, aired on MRTV-4 in 2019.

In 2020, she started her singing career and released a single song "Hnit Theint Su". The single is selected for the theme song of the drama Toh Ma Ma Nae Toh. She released a single song called "Way Thwar Mhar Soe" on 14 June 2020. she then started endeavoring to be able to produce and distribute her first solo album. She released her debut solo album "Ma Shit Ma Phyit" on 16 January 2021.

== Filmography ==
=== Film (Cinema) ===
- Hna York Ta Bawa (2016)
- The Great Myanmar (ကြီးမြတ်သောမြန်မာ) (2019)
- Kae Ma Yone Chin Nay (TBA)
- Laung Yate (TBA)
- Yadaya (TBA)

=== Television series ===
- Flowers & Butterflies (2013)
- Happy Beach Season 1 and 2 (2013)
- Forever Mandalay (ထာဝရမန္တလေး) (2014)
- The Sign of Love: Book 2 (2014)
- Pan Nu Thway (ပန်းနုသွေး) (2013)
- Wit Nyin Shite Than (ဝိညာဉ်ရှိုက်သံ) (2015)
- Winkabar San Eain (ဝင်္ကပါစံအိမ်) (2015)
- Kan Kan Ei Akyo (ကံကံ၏အကျိုး) (2016)
- Yadanar Htae Ka Yadanar (ရတနာထဲကရတနာ) (2017)
- Chit Khun Chway Thi (ချစ်ခွန်းခြွေသီ)
- Pyar Yay Aine (ပျားရည်အိုင်) (2019)
- Tatiya Myaut Sone Mat (တတိယမြောက်ဆုံမှတ်) (2019)
- Toh Ma Ma Nae Toh (တို့မမနဲ့တို့) (2020)
- Mhaw Palin (မှော်ပလ္လင်) (2021)
- Aye Yake Nyein (အေးရိပ်ငြိမ်) (2022)
- Thitsar (သစ္စာ) (2023)
- Golden Lotus In The Wave (လှိုင်းလေကြားကပန်းရွှေကြာ) (2025)

== Discography ==
=== Solo albums ===
- Ma Shit Ma Phyit (မရှိမဖြစ်) (2021)

=== Singles ===
- Hnit Theint Su (2020)
- Way Thwar Mhar Soe (2020)
