= Wint Yamone Naing =

Burmese actress

- ဝင့်ယမုံနိုင်
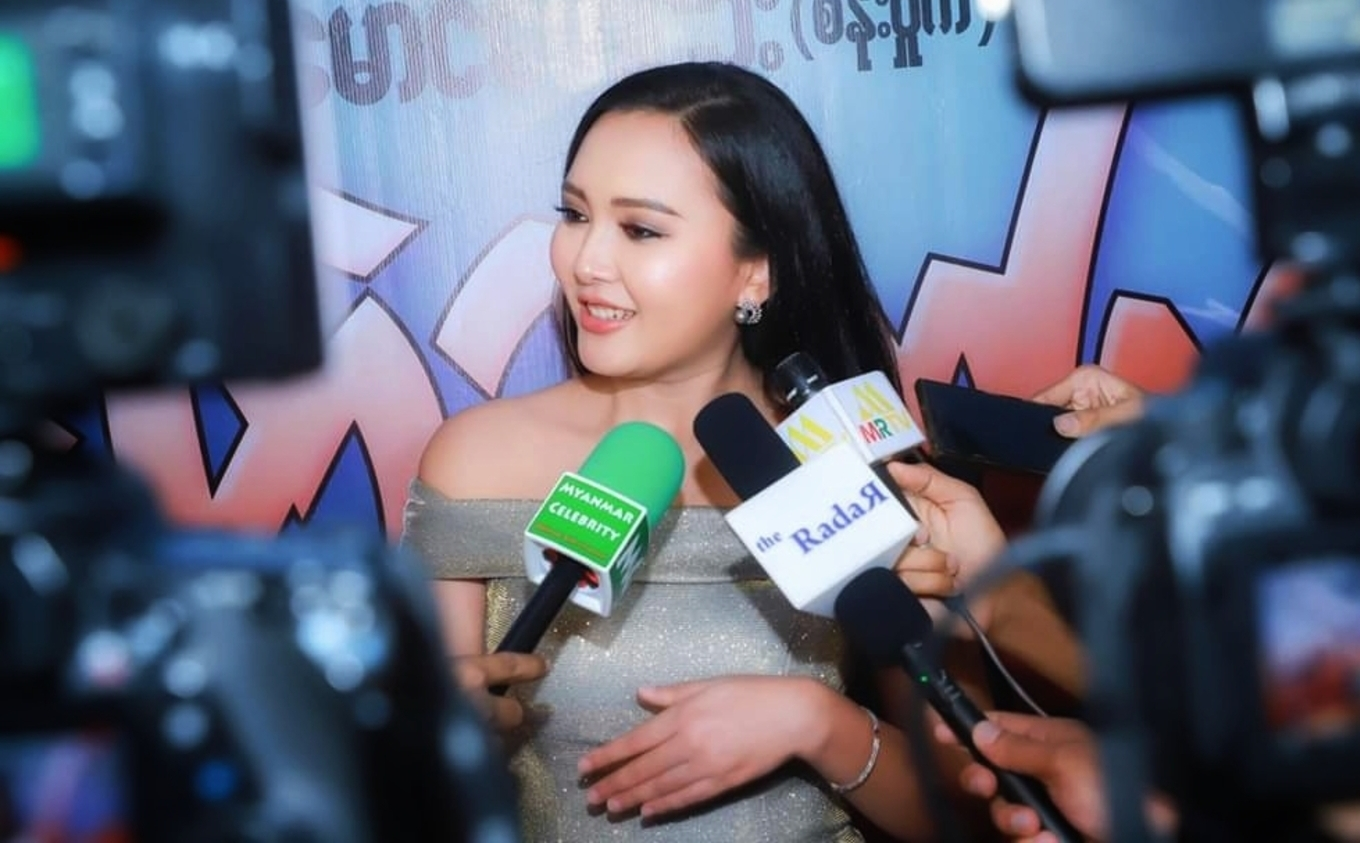
- Wint Yamone Naing in 2019
- Born: Wint Yamone Hlaing; August 1, 1990 (age 36); Dawei, Myanmar
- Education: Yangon Institute of Economics
- Occupations: Actress, model
- Years active: 2010–present
- Height: 5 ft 5 in (1.65 m)
- Spouse: Sithu Win (m. 2026)
- Parents: Bo Thit; Kyin Yee

Wint Yamone Naing (Burmese: ဝင့်ယမုံနိုင်; born 1 August 1990), formerly known as Wint Yamone Hlaing (ဝင့်ယမုံလှိုင်), is a Burmese television and film actress. She gained popularity after starring her role as Mar Yar Cho in the Myanmar's first drama series The Sign of Love.

== Early life and education ==
Wint Yamone Naing was born on 1 August 1990 in Dawei, Tanintharyi Division, Myanmar, to parent Bo Thit and his wife Kyin Yee. She is the youngest of four siblings, all girls. She attended middle school in Dawei. At the age of 15 she moved to Yangon, attended high school at Basic Education High School No. 4 Tamwe. She graduated with Bachelor of Commerce from Yangon Institute of Economics.

== Career ==
She joined Tin Moe Lwin's model training in 2010. Since then, she took professional training in modelling and the catwalk. She then entered the entertainment industry and participated in many runway fashion shows. At the end of 2010, she competed in Miss Christmas 2010, and got second runner-up award and one product title award. In 2011, she competed Mr & Miss Maxamin Forte model contest. In 2011, she again competed Miss Now How 2011 and won second runner-up award and Miss Popular award. She joined Miss Lily Contest in 2012, which she won and became Miss Lily.

As her first TV commercial she starred in Air Mandalay TV commercial directed by Aung Ko Latt in 2012 and later she appeared on commercial billboards and became the cover star of local magazines. And then came the offered for other TV commercials and music videos. After many artworks and because of her hard works, she got more popularity. In February 2012, one of her friends from model industry told her to audition for the first TV series in Myanmar which was produced by the Forever Group. She was chosen from among almost 100 actresses for the role of Mar Yar Cho the television series The Sign of Love. After airing the series on MRTV-4, which led to increase popularity for her, even though she acted in a villain character the audience loved and appreciated her so much and the audiences always called her character name Mar Yar Cho.

After starring in the series, she made her big-screen debut in the film called Angel of Eden, where played the main role with Sai Sai Kham Leng, Paing Phyo Thu and May Grace Perry which premiered in Myanmar cinemas on 29 January 2016. She also took her next film called The Filmmakers, directed by Nyo Min Lwin. In this film, she played the main role with Sai Sai Kham Leng and Phway Phway. Since that time, she was being offered to act in many videos and films. Also in 2012, Forever group surveyed and decided to continue The Sign of Love with a second season and third season. So she continued shooting The Sign Of Love season 2 and 3. After airing these continued seasons on MRTV-4, Forever Group renewed The Sign of Love as a Book 2 for Mar Yar Cho's life, then she portrayed the role of Mar Yar Cho with Han Lin Thant, Kyaw Hsu and other actors in The Sign of Love Book 2 which was a commercial success.

In 2013, she starred in comedy series Happy Beach, playing the role of Shwe Gati Bar, aired on Channel 7 in 2013. In 2016, she co-starred with Kyaw Hsu in romance drama Chit Thu Htwin Tae Atkhayar (An Engraved Letter of Love), playing the role of May Htate Htar San, which aired on MRTV-4 on 27 March 2017. In 2017, she starred in comedy series Pyaw Shwin Chin Wi-nyin (Funny Ghost Buddy) alongside Kyaw Hsu, aired on MRTV-4 on 14 June 2018. And later, she changed her name Wint Yamone Hlaing into Wint Yamone Naing.

In 2018, she starred in drama Sate Ei Chay Yar (The Footprint of Mind), alongside Kyaw Htet Zaw and Phone Shein Khant, aired on MRTV-4 on 12 February 2019. The same year, she portrayed the female lead in drama called Kya Ma Ka Mahaythi, alongside Aung Yay Chan and Than Thar Moe Theint, aired on MRTV-4 on 18 February 2019 which became the most watched Burmese television drama at that time. In 2019, she starred in crime action series Room Number? directed by Ko Thaung. After this series, she played her role as a senior police officer from Criminal Investigation Department (CID), alongside Kyaw Hsu, aired on MRTV-4 on 17 December 2019.

== Filmography ==
=== Film ===
- Good Luck (2013)
- Hmaw Win Myoe Pya (2014)
- Pyit Hmat (2015)
- The Key (2015)
- Than Ma Ni Phae Mwae Yar (2015)
- Gwa Kya Tae Gwin (2016)
- Pann Hna Pwint Nae Kya Naw Yar Za Win (2016)
- Khay Nae Kwee Yat Kwat (2016)
- Ywar Ma Naing Thar Khaing (2016)
- Thu Si Man Tae Kan A Tine (2016)
- Doe Ko Min Mae Par Zay (2016)
- The Second Heart ( 2016)
- A Chit Party Love Party (2016)
- Kya Naw Nae Swe Taw Myo Taw Myar (2017)
- Achit Ko Kite Tae Virus Myar (2017)
- Yaung Bway Ko Ko Nae Rapper Pyo Pyo (2017)
- A Lwal Paung Choke (2017)
- A Thel Kwal Mote Soe Bo (2017)
- Ko Thawt Twal Nae Ma Lak Kouk (2017)
- Ayar Ayar Tine Htet (2018)
- Ga Dung Kyite Main Ma Nae Taung Shay Wut Min Yout Kyar (2018)

=== Film (Cinema) ===
- Nga Ye So Gyo Nae Lar (2012)
- Angel of Eden (2016)
- Bye Bye Cowboy (2016)
- The Filmmakers (2017)
- Kya Naw Toe Thi Youk Kyar Myar Phit Ywae Kya Ma Toe Thi Main Ma Myar Phit Kya Thi (2017)
- A Chit Bal Thu Pone Hmar Tone (2017 )
- Myit Tar Htar Dar A Hote Ko Pal (2018 )
- Hmar Tae Bat Ka Nay Kyi Par (2019 )

=== Television series ===
- The Sign of Love (2012)
- The Sign of Love Season 2 (2012)
- The Sign of Love Season 3 (2013)
- Happy Beach Season 1 (2013)
- The Sign of Love: Book 2 (2014)
- Kan Kan Ei Akyo (2014)
- Charm (2016)
- Chit Thu Htwin Tae Atkhayar (2017)
- Hnin Sat Pwint Yae Kaung Kin (2017)
- Pyaw Shwin Chin Wit Nyin (2018)
- Sate Ei Chay Yar (2019)
- I'm Mahaythi (2019)
- Room No.? (2020)
- The Beloved (2023)
- Once Upon a Time at the University (2024)
- River of Hatred (2025)
- Born To Be One (2025)
