= Khin Zarchi Kyaw =

Burmese actress and singer

- ခင်ဇာခြည်ကျော်
- Born: Khin Zarchi Kyaw; 15 June 1976 (age 50); Rangoon, Burma
- Occupations: Actress, singer
- Years active: 1991–present
- Children: Phone Min Nay La; Htin Thit Sar
- Parent(s): Kyaw Kyaw; San San Swe
- Awards: Myanmar Academy Award (Best Actress for 2002)

Khin Zarchi Kyaw (Burmese: ခင်ဇာခြည်ကျော်; born 15 June 1976) is a Myanmar Academy Award winning Burmese actress and singer. She won the Myanmar Academy Award for Best Actress in 2002 with the film Me, Another, Men, Women. Throughout her career, she has acted in over 550 films and only released one album.

== Early life ==
Khin Zarchi Kyaw was born on 15 June 1976 in Yangon, Myanmar but grew up in Mandalay. She is the eldest child of Kyaw Kyaw and his wife San San Swe. She has an younger brother. Her family moved to Yangon from Mandalay when she was 15 years old.

== Career ==
Khin Zarchi Kyaw started her acting career in 1991. She made her acting debut with a leading role in the film Khayar Tar Tar, alongside Nay Aung and Ye Aung, directed by Khin Zaw (Kaythipan). She then starred in her second film Phyu Ni Nyo Pyar, where she played a main role with Min Oo, Chit Chit Zaw and Lin Zarni Zaw. The film was both a domestic hit, and led to increased recognition for Khin Zarchi Kyaw. In 1992, she took on her first big-screen role in the film Chit Pan Thi Tae Main Kalay, alongside May Sweet, Yan Aung and Yan Kyaw which screened in Myanmar cinemas in 1993. In 1999, she released a solo album "Shin Ma Pya Naing Buu".

In 1994, she starred in the big-screen film Naw Yin Mhwe, which earned her a nomination for the 1994 Myanmar Academy Award for Best Supporting Actress. She won the Best Actress in the 2002 Myanmar Academy Award for her performance in the film Me, Another, Men, Women. Ever since then she had starred in over 50 big screen films and over 500 films.

In 2018, she starred in the film The Attachment, was screened in Myanmar cinemas on 8 June 2018 which earned her a nomination for the 2019 Myanmar Academy Award for Best Supporting Actress.

== Filmography ==
=== Film ===
Over 500 films, including

- Khayar Tar Tar (ခရာတာတာ) (1990)
- Phyu Ni Nyo Pyar (ဖြူနီညိုပြာ) (1990)

=== Film (Cinema) ===
Over 50 films, including

- Chit Pan Thi Tae Main Kalay (ချစ်ပန်းသီတဲ့မိန်းကလေး) (1993)
- Naw Yin Mhwe (နော်ရင်မွှေး) (1994)
- Me, Another, Men, Women (ငါ သူတစ်ပါး ယောက်ျား မိန်းမ) (2002)
- Yazawin Yine Khae The (ရာဇဝင်ရိုင်းခဲ့သည်) (2018)
- Ta Khu Latt (တခုလတ်) (2018)
- The Attachment (ဥပါဒါန်) (2018)
- Myet Nu (2020)

=== Television series ===
- The Sun, The Moon and The Truth (နေရယ်လရယ်အမှန်တရားရယ်) (2015)
- Where There is Love (ချစ်ခြင်းတရားတို့ရှိရာ) (2019)
- 101% Love (၁၀၁% အချစ်) (2022)
- Ah Mone (အမုန်း) (2023)
- Mha Ta Par A Char Ma Shi Pee (မှတစ်ပါး အခြားမရှိပြီ) (2026)

=== Programs ===
- The Mask Singer Myanmar

== Discography ==
=== Album ===
- Shin Ma Pya Naing Buu (1999)

== Awards and nominations ==
Year	Award	Category	Nominated work	Result
1994	Myanmar Motion Picture Academy Awards	Best Supporting Actress	Naw Yin Mhwe	Nominated
2002	Myanmar Motion Picture Academy Awards	Best Actress	Me, Another, Men, Women	Won
2018	Myanmar Motion Picture Academy Awards	Best Supporting Actress	The Attachment	Nominated
2023	Myanmar Motion Picture Academy Awards	Best Supporting Actress	Kan Kaung (Lucky)	Nominated

== Personal life ==
Khin Zarchi Kyaw married in 2000 and divorced in 2009. From the marriage, she had a son named Phone Min Nay La, an actor and model, and a daughter named Htin Thit Sar, a model.
