= Aung Min Khant =

Burmese actor and model

- အောင်မင်းခန့်
- Born: Aung Min Khant; November 25, 1990 (age 35); Yangon, Myanmar
- Education: University of Distance Education, Yangon
- Occupation: Actor • Model
- Years active: 2008–present
- Height: 5 ft 9 in (1.75 m)
- Parent(s): Tun Oo; Win Win Kyi

Aung Min Khant (Burmese: အောင်မင်းခန့်; born 25 November 1990) is a Burmese television and film actor. He gained recognitions for his roles in television series Forever Mandalay (2014), Wit Nyin Shite Than (2015), Winkabar San Eain (2015) and Magical Village (2017).

== Early life and education ==
Aung Min Khant was born on 25 November 1990 in Yangon, Myanmar. He is the youngest son of Tun Oo and his wife Win Win Kyi. He has an elder brother. He is a cousin of actor Naing Naing. He attended high school at Basic Education High School No. 2 Dagon. He graduated from University of Distance Education, Yangon with a degree in History in 2011.

== Career ==
=== 2008–2012: Beginnings as a model ===
Aung Min Khant joined John Lwin's model training in 2008. Since then, he took professional training in modelling and catwalk. He began his entertainment career as a runway model as part of the John Lwin's John International Modeling Agency with countless advertising shows and runways that had been walked on. And then he competed in the male model contests and became the winner of Mr. Maxamin Forte in 2011, and runner up of Manhunt 2 in 2012. Then came the offers for TV commercials and then DVD ones. His hardwork as a model and acting in commercials was noticed by the film industry and soon, film casting offers came rolling in. He entered a five-year contract with MRTV-4 Talent Center in 2011.

=== 2014–2016: Acting debut and recognition ===
He made his acting debut in 2014 with a leading role in the television drama Forever Mandalay, alongside Han Lin Thant, Aung Yay Chan, Chue Lay and May Me Kyaw Kyaw, aired on MRTV-4 in February 2014 and received positive reviews for his portrayal of Phone Moe Thun, which led to increased popularity for him. He then starred in his second television series Wit Nyin Shite Than, where he played the leading role with Han Lin Thant, Kyaw Htet, May Me Me Kyaw, Hsaung Wutyee May and Khin Sandar Myint which aired on MRTV-4, on 1 April 2015.

In 2015, he starred the male lead in the television series Wingabar San Eain, alongside Poe Kyar Phyu Khin and Hsaung Wutyee May. Aung's portrayal of the character Dr Sao Khun Hmaing earned praised by fans for his acting performance and character interpretation, and experienced a resurgence of popularity.

The same year, he took on his first big-screen leading role in the film Myaing Yazar Tut Pi Nae Yan Pone Ngwe Pyauk Shar Pone Taw. He was cast in film Taninganway Nya Kaung. The two films will be screen in 2020. In 2016, he starred in drama Better Tomorrow, where he played the leading role with Aung Yay Chan, Nat Khat and Chue Lay, aired on 12 October 2016.

=== 2017–present: Big success ===
Aung Min Khant gain increased attention and popularity with his role as Dragon King Nay Thura in the popular historical series Yadanar Htae Ka Yadanar alongside Kaung Myat San and Myat Thu Thu, aired on MRTV-4, on 30 January 2017 which was a huge commercial success, topping television ratings and becoming the most watched Burmese television drama at that time. The same year, he co-starred in the series Magical Village alongside Thu Riya, Chue Lay and Nan Sandar Hla Htun which aired on MRTV-4, on 14 September 2017.

His film Myitta Htar Tar A Hoke Ko Pal, was screened in Myanmar cinemas on 25 May 2018. In 2018, Aung starred in the hit crime-action series It was on Yesterday 2, playing the role of serial killer Thuta.

== Filmography ==
=== Film (Cinema) ===
- Myitta Htar Tar A Hoke Ko Pal (မေတ္တာထားတာ အဟုတ်ကိုပဲ) (2018)
- Fraud Of Brother (ကွီးတို့၏မာယာ) (2019)
- Myaing Yazar Tut Pi Nae Yan Pone Ngwe Pyauk Shar Pone Taw (မြိုင်ရာဇာတွတ်ပီနဲ့ရန်ပုံငွေပျောက်ရှာပုံတော်) (2020)
- Taninganway Nya Kaung (တနင်္ဂနွေညကျောင်း) (2020)
- Beyond The Law (နိယာမအလွန်) (2020)
- Who are you? (မင်းဘာကောင်လဲ ငါဘာကောင်လဲ၊ ဘယ်သူဘာကောင်လဲ) (2020)
- General Aung San (‌အောင်ဆန်းရုပ်ရှင်) (TBA)
- Pieces Of Broken Mirror (ကွဲအက်သွားသော မှန်ချပ်များ)

=== Television series ===
Year	English title	Myanmar title	Role	Network	Notes
2014	Forever Mandalay	ထာဝရမန္တလေး	Phone Moe Thun	MRTV-4	
2015	Wit Nyin Shite Than	ဝိညာဉ်ရှိုက်သံ	Hein Htut Khaung	MRTV-4	
2015	Winkabar San Eain	ဝင်္ကပါစံအိမ်	Dr. Sao Khun Hmaing	MRTV-4	
2016	Better Tomorrow	ပို၍လှသောမနက်ဖြန်	Mg Wann Thar	MRTV-4	
2017	Yadanar Htae Ka Yadanar	ရတနာထဲကရတနာ	Dragon King. Nay Thura	MRTV-4	
2017	Magical Village	ပဉ္စလတ်ရွာ	Yoe Sit	MRTV-4	
2018	It was on Yesterday 2	မနေ့ကဖြစ်သည် ၂	Thuta	MRTV-4	
2019	Myetlone Mhar Alwan Nhotekhan Mhar Marna	မျက်လုံးမှာအလွမ်း နှုတ်ခမ်းမှာမာန	Aung Mhann	MRTV-4	
2022	Crying Forest	အိပ်မက်ငိုတော	Phone Myat	Canal+ Zat Lenn	
2022	Athae Kwae Piya Say	အသည်းကွဲပီယဆေး		Mahar	
2023	Yin Khone Than FM	ရင်ခုန်သံ FM		Channel K	
2024	Ku Htone Mae Chit Chin	ကုထုံးမဲ့ချစ်ခြင်း	Dr. Khet Man	Mahar	
