= Happy Beach =

Burmese television series

- Genre: Comedy
- Directed by: Maung Thi
- Starring: Kyi Zaw Htet; Kyaw Hsu; Min Tharke; Kyaw Htet; Thwin Min Khant; Wint Yamone Naing; Khay Sett Thwin; Mone; Thet Oo Ko; Myat Thu Thu; Zu Zu Zan
- Country of origin: Myanmar
- Original language: Burmese
- No. of seasons: 2
- No. of episodes: 85 (44+41)

Production
- Production location: Myanmar
- Running time: 30 minutes
- Production company: Media Kabar

Original release
- Network: For Comedy Channel
- Release: 7 October 2013 – 29 December 2014

Happy Beach is a Burmese comedy television series. Its season 1 aired from October 7 to December 5, 2013 and its season 2 aired from November 3 to December 29, 2014, from Mondays to Fridays at 06:15, on For Comedy Channel, channel from 4TV Network.

Its season 1 also aired on Channel 7, from 14 October to 12 December 2013, on Mondays to Fridays at 17:00 for 44 episodes and season 2 aired on MRTV-4, from November 10, 2014 to January 5, 2015, on Mondays to Fridays at 19:00 for 41 episodes.

== Cast ==
- Kyi Zaw Htet as Maung Yin
- Kyaw Hsu as Kyaw Hsu
- Min Tharke as Tharke
- Kyaw Htet as Kyi Aye
- Thwin Min Khant as Thwin Min
- Wint Yamone Naing as Shwe Katipar
- Khay Sett Thwin as Ta Pwint Pann
- Mone as Pearl
- Thet Oo Ko as Thet Oo
- Myat Thu Thu as Zin
- Zu Zu Zan as Zu Zu
- Kaung Myat San (season 1) (Ep.18) Guest
- Soe Nandar kyaw (season 1) (Ep.18) Guest
- May Myint Mo (season 2)
- Chue Lay (season 2)
- Nat Khat (season 2)
