= University of Distance Education, Yangon =

Education organization in Yangon, Myanmar

Coordinates: 16°49′13.7″N 96°08′11.0″E

- အဝေးသင် တက္ကသိုလ် (ရန်ကုန်)
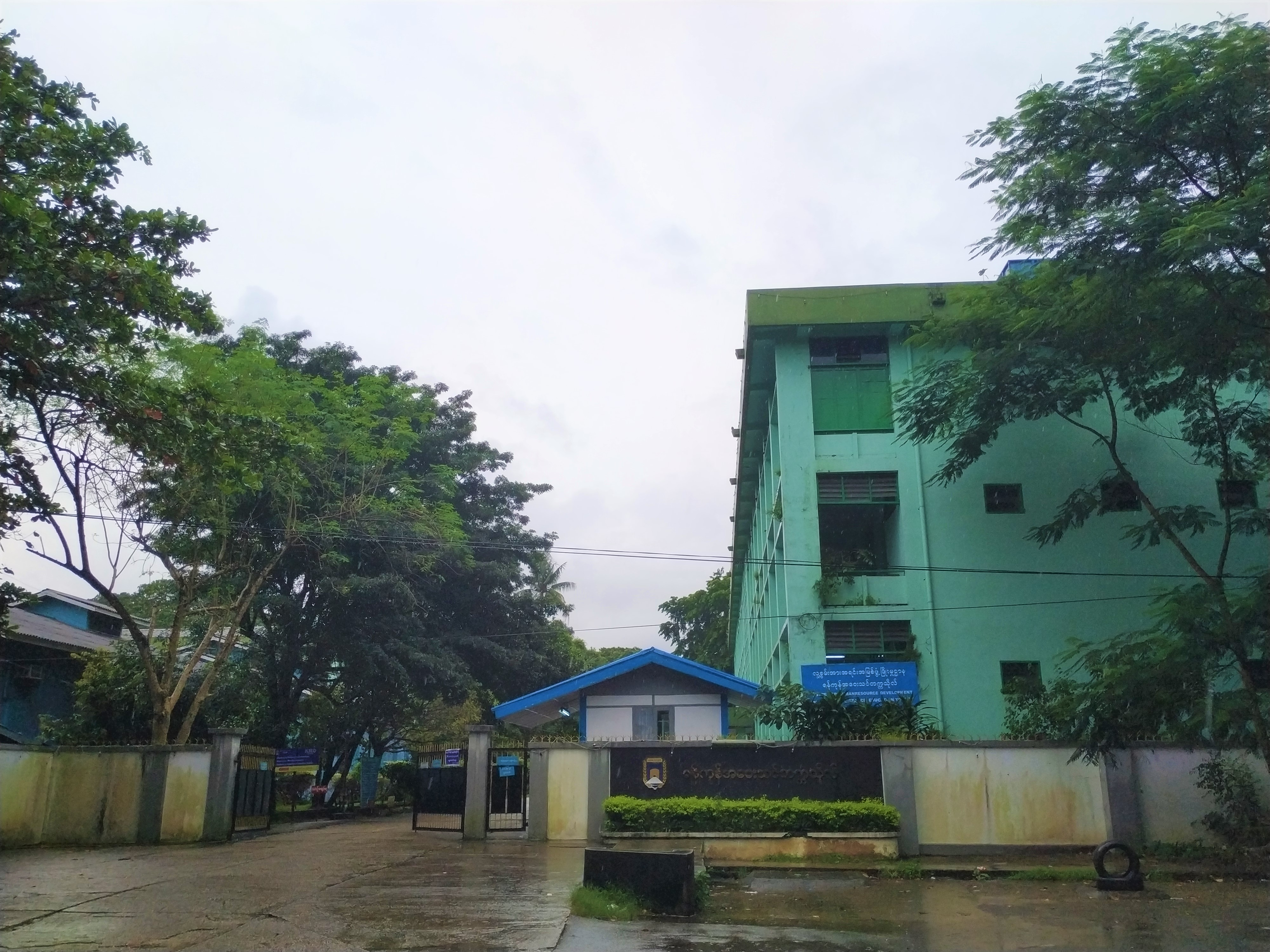
- Motto: For one 's desires, education never too far ပညာရေး ဝေးသည်မရှိ
- Type: public
- Established: 1992; 34 years ago
- Rector: Dr Hla Tint
- Students: 560,000 (2002)
- Location: Kamayut 11041, Yangon; Yangon Division, Myanmar
- Website: www.yude.edu.mm

The University of Distance Education, Yangon (Burmese: အဝေးသင် တက္ကသိုလ် (ရန်ကုန်) [ʔəwéθɪ̀ɰ̃ tɛʔkəθò (jàɰ̃ɡòʊɰ̃)]), located in Yangon, is one of two universities under the University of Distance Education system in Myanmar. With over 500,000 students mostly studying liberal arts and economics, the UDE system is the largest university in Myanmar. The Yangon university serves distance education students in Lower Myanmar whereas the University of Distance Education, Mandalay serves Upper Myanmar.

Reflecting the country's low Internet penetration rates, the primary method of communication between the students and faculty is still by regular mail. Lectures for popular majors like economics and sciences are regularly broadcast over the country's Intranet available in over 700 e-Learning Centers throughout the country.

== History ==
Distance education was pioneered in Myanmar by Yangon Institute of Education, which began offering a diploma in education by way of mail correspondence in 1973 and a Bachelor of Education (B.Ed.) program also by correspondence in 1981. Yangon University offered correspondence courses for arts, science, economics and law. Mandalay University began its own correspondence education in 1979. By 1981, all universities and degree colleges were allowed to offer correspondence courses.

The University of Distance Education was established in July 1992, with Yangon and Mandalay as the hubs in Lower and Upper Myanmar, respectively. The UDE has 32 campuses throughout the country. The UDE's popularity has consistently increased. The enrollment in the university increased from over 38,000 in academic year 1987–88 to over 560,000 students in 2001–02.

== Programs ==
The UDE offers 19 subjects, including economics, law and five science subjects. Economics and related subjects of Public Policy, Business Management and Home Economics attract most students.

== Campuses ==
The university maintains branches in the following cities.

- Bago
- Dawei
- Hinthada
- Maubin
- Mawlamyaing
- Myeik
- Pa-an
- Pathein
- Pyay
- Sittwe
- Taungoo
- Yangon
  - Dagon
  - East Yangon
  - West Yangon
