= Shin Mwe La =

Burmese actor and model

- ရှင်မွေလ
- Born: Shin Mwe La; 22 September 1995 (age 30)
- Occupations: Actor; Model
- Years active: 2016–present
- Known for: Pyar Yay Aine; G Hall Thu; Tatiya Myaut Sone Mat; Ma Ma Htake and Heritage House; Rose
- Parents: U Win Zaw Tun (father); Daw See Sar (mother)

Shin Mwe La (Burmese: ရှင်မွေလ; born September 22 1995) is a Burmese model and actor. He made his debut in the MRTV-4 series Ko Lu Pyo (2016). He is best known for his roles in television series Ma Ma Htake and Heritage House (2016), Pyar Yay Aine (2018), Kyain Sar Pyal Dan Dar Yee (2018), Rose (2019), Tatiya Myaut Sone Mat (2019), G Hall Thu (2020), Kwat Lat Ma Shi (2022), and Flower Trap (2023).

== Early life and education ==
He was born on September 22, 1995 to a Burmese father, U Win Zaw Htun, and a Karen mother, Daw Sea Sa and he is the eldest of three siblings. He is a christian, and his name, Shin Mwe La, is taken from the Bible.

== Career ==
He opened a video rental shop at home, and became interested in acting after watching videos to tell stories to the customers. He then attended John Lwin modeling course in September 2012. He then collaborated with Satori Video to film a video with his friends, but it was never produced. He was selected in a casting call by MRTV-4, and after attending the course, he appeared in dramas broadcast by MRTV-4, becoming known under his real name Shin Mwe La.

== Filmography ==
=== Television series ===
Year	English title	Burmese title	Role	Broadcast TV
2016	Ko Lu Pyo	ကိုလူပျို	Himself (Guest appearance)	MRTV-4
2016	Ma Ma Htake and Heritage House	မမထိပ်နှင့်အမွှေစံအိမ်	Zeyar Maung	MRTV-4
2018	Pyar Yay Aine	ပျားရည်အိုင်	Phay Myaing	MRTV-4
2018	Kyain Sar Pyal Dan Dar Yee	ကျိန်စာပြယ်ဒဏ္ဍာရီ	Thaw Thaw Sit	MRTV-4
2019	Tatiya Myaut Sone Mat	တတိယမြောက်ဆုံမှတ်	Swan Yi	MRTV-4
2019	Rose	နှင်းဆီ	Zaw	MRTV-4
2020	G Hall Thu	ဂျီဟောသူ	Lin Nyo	MRTV-4
2022	Kwat Lat Ma Shi	ကွက်လပ်မရှိ	Nay Min Ta Yar	MRTV-4
2023	Flower Trap	ပန်းထောင်ချောက်	Min Thura	MRTV-4
2025	The Mist Forever	မြူနှင်းတို့ထာဝရဝေ	Nay Set Kyar	MRTV-4
2025	Wut Mone Ta Set Ei A Htote Patti	ဝတ်မှုန်တစ်စက်၏အတ္ထုပ္ပတ္တိ	Thit Min Lu	Fortune TV
2026	Lo Taya	လိုတရ	Nyan Kyaw	MRTV-4
2026	A Mone Myat Yee	အမုန်းမျက်ရည်	Ye Tay Za	Mahar

=== Movies ===
Year	English title	Burmese title	Role
2025	Law Ka Dan	လောကဓံ	
2026	Yite Pauk	ရိုက်ပေါက်	Htet Phyo
2026	Htee Kalay Yae A Yake	ထီးကလေးရဲ့ အရိပ်	
