= Sithu Win (actor) =

Burmese actor and model

- စည်သူဝင်း
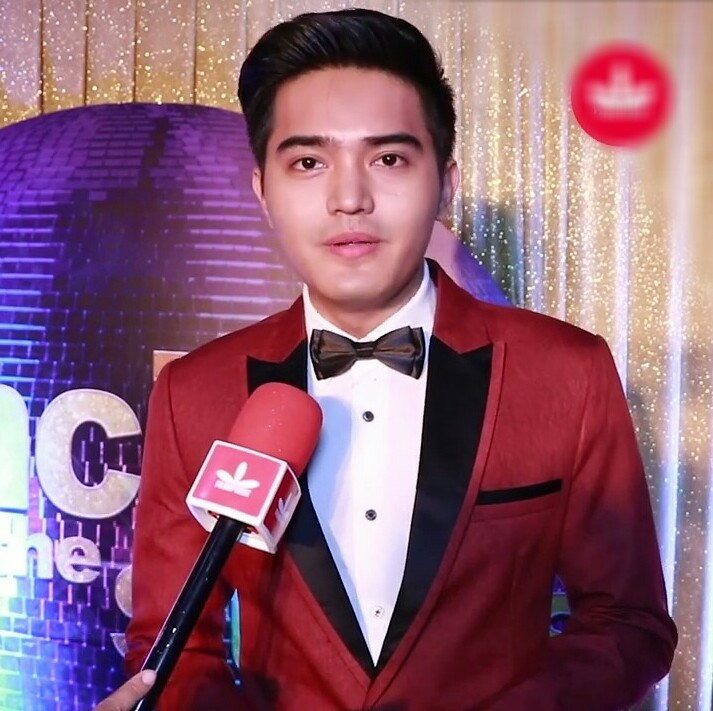
- Born: 31 January 1995 (age 31); Yangon, Myanmar
- Education: Dagon University
- Occupations: Actor, model
- Years active: 2011–present
- Spouse: Wint Yamone Naing (m. 2026)

Sithu Win (Burmese: စည်သူဝင်း; born 31 January 1995) is a Burmese television actor. He is best known for his roles in several MRTV-4 series and became popular among the audiences with the series Moe Kaung Kin Eain Met (2018) and Rose (2019).

== Early life and education ==
Sithu Win was born on 31 January 1995 in Yangon, Myanmar. He is the younger of two brothers. He attended high school at BEHS 3 Thaketa, and graduated from Dagon University.

== Career ==
He started his modeling career in 2011. In 2016, he starred in his debut MRTV-4 drama series Lu Yee Chun alongside Myat Thu Kyaw, May Mi Kyaw Kyaw, Chue Lay, Kyaw Hsu and Su Waddy. In 2017, he starred in the drama series Sone See Chin Moe Tain Myar alongside Aung Yay Chan, May Myint Mo and Khay Sett Thwin.

In 2018, he starred in the drama series Nway Kandar Oo alongside Ye Aung, Htun Eaindra Bo and Mya Hnin Yee Lwin. In the same year, he starred in the drama series Moe Kaung Kin Eain Met alongside Kyaw Htet Zaw and Poe Kyar Phyu Khin. In 2019, he starred in the action-drama series Winkabar Shin Tan alongside Nat Khat, Nan Sandar Hla Htun, Kyaw Htet and Thar Htet Nyan Zaw. In the same year, he starred in the drama series Rose alongside Ye Aung and Khay Sett Thwin.

== Political activities ==
Following the 2021 Myanmar coup d'état, Sithu Win was active in the anti-coup movement both in person at rallies and through social media. On 3 April 2021, warrants for his arrest were issued under section 505 (a) of the Myanmar Penal Code by the State Administration Council for speaking out against the military coup. Along with several other celebrities, he was charged with calling for participation in the Civil Disobedience Movement (CDM) and damaging the state's ability to govern, with supporting the Committee Representing Pyidaungsu Hluttaw, and with generally inciting the people to disturb the peace and stability of the nation.

== Filmography ==
=== Television series ===
- Lu Yee Chun (2016)
- Sone See Chin Moe Tain Myar (2017)
- Nway Kandar Oo (2018)
- Moe Kaung Kin Eain Met (2018)
- Winkabar Shin Tan (2019)
- Toxic season 2 (2019)
- Rose (2019)
- The Beloved (2023)
- Once Upon a Time at the University (2024)
