= Mone (Burmese actress) =

Burmese actress

- မုဏ်း
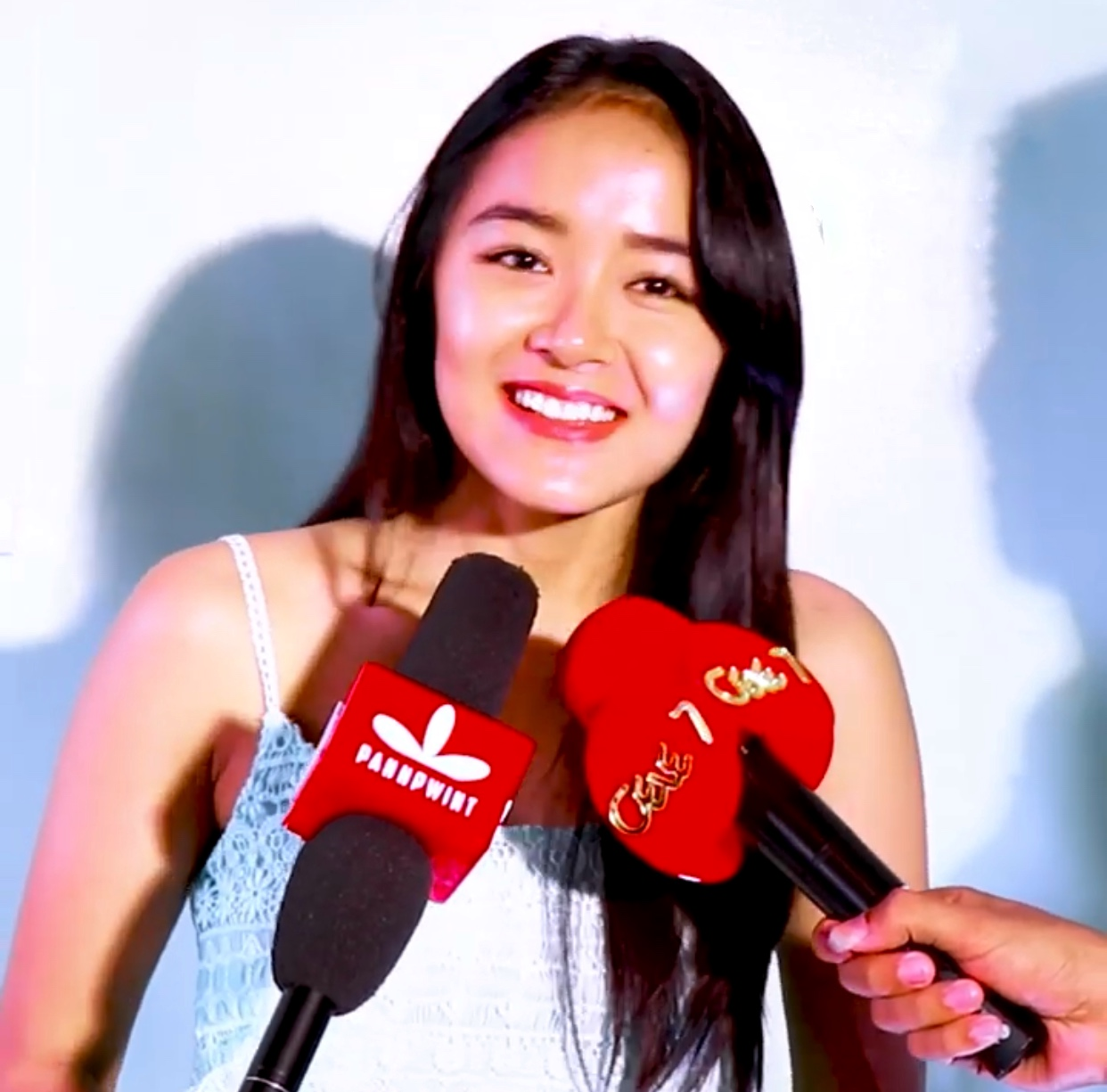
- Mone in 2019
- Born: Hsu Nandar Aung; 27 October 1992 (age 33); Yangon, Myanmar
- Other name: mone mone
- Education: University of Distance Education, Yangon
- Occupation: Actress
- Years active: 2012–present
- Relatives: One younger Sister

Mone (Burmese: မုဏ်း; born Hsu Nandar Aung on 27 October 1992) is a Burmese television and film actress. She is best known for her role in television series Shwe Kyar Phoo Thit (2018), Toxic (2018), A Lin Htae Ka Lu (2019) and Late Pyar Hnaung Kyo (2019).

== Early life and education ==
Mone was born on October 27, 1992, in Yangon, Myanmar. She began her education at BEPS 18 Hlaing, then continued at BEMS (6) and BEMS (8) in Hlaing Township. She completed her high school education at BEHS 1 Hlaing. Mone enrolled in a history program at the University of Distance Education, Yangon, but discontinued her studies in the second year.

== Family ==
Mone has one younger sister.

== Career ==
In 2012, she started her career form competing in Yatha Paw Lwin Tha Yote Saung Lwin Pyin. After competing it, MRTV-4 talent was selected for the new cast. In 2013, she starred in comedy series Happy Beach alongside Kyi Zaw Htet, Kyaw Hsu, Min Tharke, Khay Sett Thwin, Wint Yamone Naing, Myat Thu Thu and Zu Zu Zan. In 2014, she co-starred in drama series Forever Mandalay alongside Aung Min Khant, Chue Lay, Aung Yay Chan, Nat Khat and Ju Jue Kay. In 2016, she starred in drama series Ma Ma Htake and Heritage House alongside Khine Thin Kyi, Hein Htet, Poe Kyar Phyu Khin and Su Waddy.

In 2018, she starred in drama series Shwe Kyar Phoo Thit. In 2019, she starred in action-drama series A Lin Htae Ka Lu alongside Si Phyo and Ju Jue Kay. The same year, she starred in thriller series Toxic alongside Moht Moht Myint Aung, Min Oo, Kyaw Hsu, Mya Hnin Yee Lwin and Thi Ha. The same year, she starred in horror-drama series Late Pyar Hnaung Kyo alongside Hein Htet (actor), May Mi Ko Ko and Thi Ha.

== Filmography ==
=== Film ===
- Mhone (2014)

=== Film (cinema) ===
- Baw Baw Ka Htaw (2018)
- Hit Tine (2019)
- Lady Danger (2020)
- Myet Nu (2020)

=== Television series ===
- Happy Beach (2013)
- Forever Mandalay (ထာဝရမန္တလေး) (2014)
- Ma Ma Htake and Heritage House (မမထိပ်နှင့်အမွှေစံအိမ်) (2016)
- Shwe Kyar Phoo Thit (ရွှေကြာဖူးသစ်) (2018)
- Toxic (2018)
- A Lin Htae Ka Lu (အလင်းထဲကလူ) (2019)
- Late Pyar Hnaung Kyo (လိပ်ပြာနှောင်ကြိုး) (2019)
- Say Ta Lone Maung Phone (စေတလုံးမောင်ဘုန်း) (2021)
- U Phee Gyan's Small Shop (ဦးဖီးကြမ်းတို့ဆိုင်ကလေး) (2022)
- Biography of Beloved (အချစ်ဆုံးသူရဲ့အတ္ထုပ္ပတ္တိ) (2025)
- Myu Hnin Toh Htawara Wai (မြူနှင်းတို့ထာဝရဝေ) (2025)
