= Luyeechon =

Luyeechon, Lu Yee Chun, Lu Yee Chon or Luyeechun may refer to:

- Luyeechon Project, an educational initiative in Myanmar
- Lu Yee Chun, a 2016 Burmese drama television series aired on MRTV-4
