= May Mi Ko Ko =

Burmese actress

- မေမီကိုကို
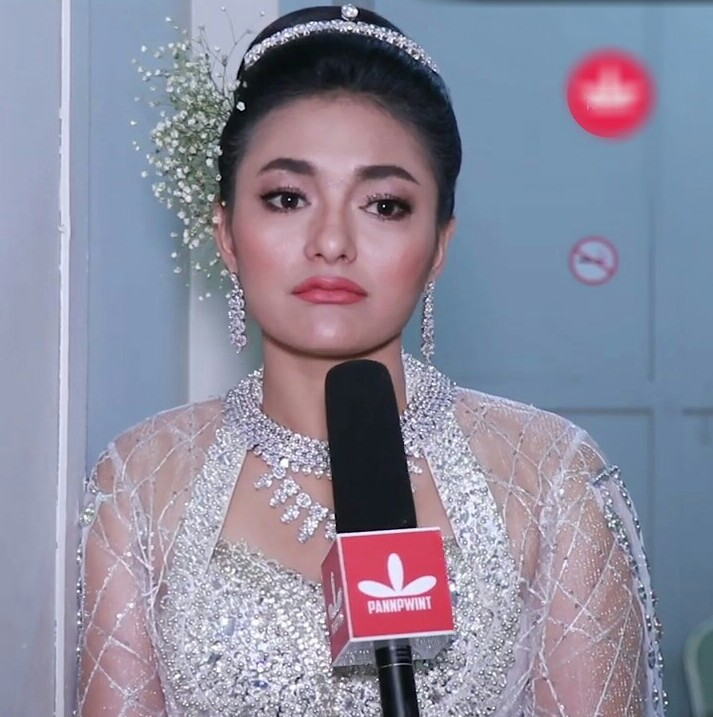
- Born: May Zin Phyo; November 26, 1992 (age 33); Bhamo, Myanmar
- Occupation: Actress
- Years active: 2008–present
- Awards: Best TV Series Actress Award (Star Awards 2018)

May Mi Ko Ko (Burmese: မေမီကိုကို; born May Zin Phyo 26 November 1992) is a Burmese television and film actress, singer, and writer. She gained popularity among audiences after starring in her role as Myaing in the MRTV-4 drama series Pyar Yay Aine; she won the Best Actress Award in Star Awards 2018 by this series.

== Early life ==
May Mi Ko Ko was born on November 26, 1992, in Bhamo, Kachin State, Myanmar. She is youngest of three siblings. She attended at Bhamo school and moved to Yangon high school BEHS Thuwana.

== Career ==
Before started acting career, she worked as a Model. In 2012, she competed for new cast in MRTV-4 Talent Management Centre and she was selected by Forever Group. In 2016, he starred in her debut comedy series Ko Lu Pyo alongside Phone Set Thwin, May Akari Htoo and Shwe Sin Wint Shein.

In 2017, she starred in drama series Hubris alongside Han Lin Thant and Hsaung Wutyee May. In 2018, she starred in drama series A Yake alongside Nat Khat, Hein Htet (actor), May Myint Mo and Nan Sandar Hla Htun. In the same year, she starred in drama series Pyar Yay Aine as the character Myaing alongside Aung Yay Chan, Phone Shein Khant, Shin Mway La, Hein Min Thu and Myat Thu Thu and she gain popularity among the audiences. And she won Best TV Series Actress Award in Star Awards 2018 by this series.

In 2019, she starred in horror-drama series Late Pyar Hnaung Kyo alongside Hein Htet (actor), Mone and Thi Ha. In the same year, she starred in action series Tatiya Myaut Sone Mat alongside Hein Htet (actor) and Myat Thu Thu. In 2020, she starred in comedy-drama series G Hall Thu as the character Nyo Htwe alongside Hein Htet (actor).

In 2020, she starred in drama series Ma Kyay Si as the character Ma Kyay Si.

In 2022, she starred in drama series Thway Nae Yay Tae Pan Chi as the character Myu Hnin alongside as Yair Yint Aung.

In 2023, she starrsted in drama series Mahuyar Pearl as the character Mya May Wai alongside Aung Yay Chan. In the same year, she starred in drama series Blue Sea and Blue Sky as the character Shwe Hay Thi alongside Aung Yay Chan, and Ingyi Htoo.

== Filmography ==
=== Film ===
Year	Film	Film Production	Director	Role	Note
2018	(လော်ကြီးမှုတ်၍ခံခဲ့ပြီ)	CKKP Film	Shwe Yay Htin Htin	Ami	Guest Appearance
2020	Players	Bo Bo Film Production	Pyi Hein Thiha	Myat Sandi Oo	
2022	Kyaw Gyi Ka Chit Tat Tal ( ကျော်ကြီးကချစ်တယ်သည် )ကျော်ကြီးကလိုးတတ်တယ်	Khit Thit Ar Yone Oo	Ko Zaw (Ar Yone Oo)		
2024	သဘင်သည် မြနှင်းဆီ - The Beginning	Sein Htay Film Production	Min Set Thit		

=== Video ===
Year	Film	Film Production	Director	Note
2018	Missing Miss	Myanmar Magic Media	Nyo Min Lwin	Channel 7 (Myanmar) exclusive

=== Television series ===
Year	English title	Myanmar title	Role	Network	Notes
2016	Ko Lu Pyo	ကိုလူပျို	Thu La Wun	MRTV-4	
2017	Hubris	မာန်	Thaw Thaw	MRTV-4	
2018	A Yake	အရိပ်	Nally Cho	MRTV-4	
2018	Pyar Yay Aine	ပျားရည်အိုင်	Nwe Tway Myaing	MRTV-4	Won-Best TV Series Actress Award
2019	Toxic Season 2	အဆိပ်သွေး အတွဲ ၂	Yein	Canal+ Zat Lenn	
2019	Late Pyar Hnaung Kyo	လိပ်ပြာနှောင်ကြိုး	Juri May	MRTV-4	
2019	Tatiya Myaut Sone Mat	တတိယမြောက်ဆုံမှတ်	Ngwe Pa Chi	MRTV-4	
2020	G Hall Thu	ဂျီဟောသူ	Nyo Htwe	MRTV-4	
2022	Ma Kyay Si	မကြေးစည်	Ma Kyay Si	MRTV-4	
2022	Thway Nae Yay Tae Pan Chi	သွေးနဲ့ရေးတဲ့ပန်းချီ	Myu Hnin	Channel K	
2023	Mahuyar Pearl	မဟူရာပုလဲ	Mya Mya Wai	MRTV-4	
2023	Pin Lal Pyar Pyar Moe Pyar Pyar (lit. Blue Sea and Blue Sky)	ပင်လယ်ပြာပြာမိုးပြာပြာ	Shwe Hay Thi	Fortune TV	
2025		သူ့ကိုမှချစ်မိသည်	(Muyar KoKo) မူရာကိုကို	Fortune TV	
2024		လက်ဆောင်			

== Discography ==
=== Single ===
- A Lwan Pyay (အလွမ်းပြေ) (25.7.2020)
- Yone Kyi Nay Mae Chit Chin (ft. KM) (ယုံကြည်နေမယ့်ချစ်ခြင်း) (14.9.2020)
- A Nan Pan (ft. Kyaw Min Khant) (အနမ်းပန်း) (26.11.2020)

== Publications ==
=== Short Stories Collection ===
- A Nan Ta Pwint Ei Kyein Sar (အနမ်းတစ်ပွင့်၏ကျိန်စာ) (8.8.2020)

== Awards ==
Year	Award	Category	Nominated work	Result
2018	Star Awards	Best TV Series Actress Award	Pyar Yay Aine	Won
2024	Myanmar Academy Award	Best Actress	Tha Bin Thae Mya Hnin Si - The Beginning	Nominated
