= Khay Sett Thwin =

Burmese actress

- ခေးဆက်သွင်
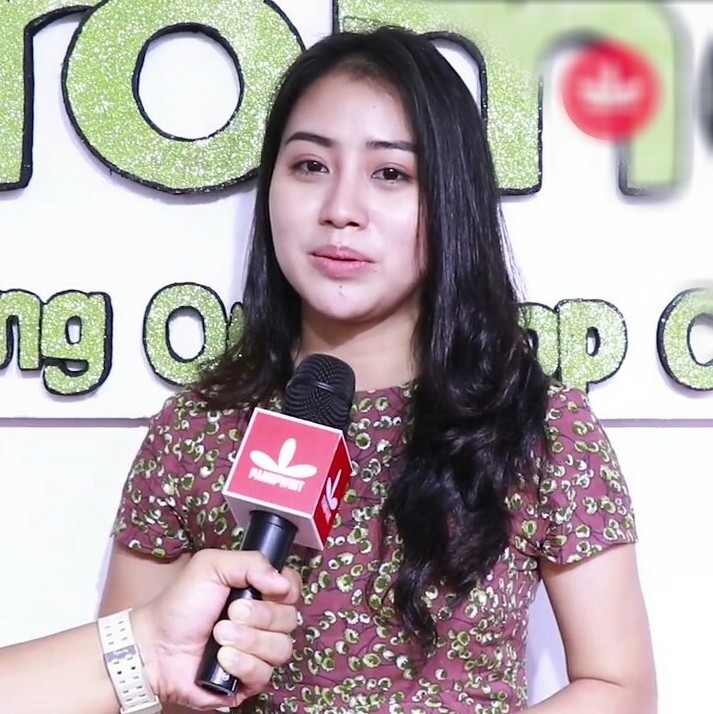
- Khay Sett Thwin in 2019
- Born: Phyo Phyo Ei; March 21, 1991 (age 35); Mandalay, Myanmar
- Education: West Yangon University
- Occupations: Actress, model
- Years active: 2012–present
- Awards: 2nd Runner-up Award (Miss Beautiful Footstep 2011); Best Smile Award (Miss People 2011)

Khay Sett Thwin (Burmese: ခေးဆက်သွင်; born Phyo Phyo Ei on 21 March 1991) is a Burmese television and film actress. She is best known for her roles in several MRTV-4 series and became popular among the audiences with the series A Yake (2018) and Rose (2019).

== Early life and education ==
Khay Sett Thwin was on March 21, 1991 in Mandalay, Myanmar. She graduated with a degree B.A English from West Yangon University.

== Career ==
She started her career from attending at Talents & Models Agency in 2011. She competed in Miss Beautiful Footstep 2011 and won 2nd Runner-up. She also competed in Miss People 2011 and won Best Smile Award.

In 2013, she starred in her debut comedy-drama series Flowers & Butterflies as the character Thadar alongside Kyi Zaw Htet, Kyaw Hsu, Nat Khat and Soe Nandar Kyaw. In the same year, she starred in comedy series Happy Beach alongside Kyi Zaw Htet, Kyaw Hsu, Min Tharke, Mone, Wint Yamone Naing, Myat Thu Thu and Zu Zu Zan. In 2015, she starred in comedy-drama series Eain Nee Chin alongside Kaung Myat San.

In 2017, she starred in drama series Sone See Chin Moe Tain Myar alongside Si Thu Win and May Myint Mo. In the same year, she starred in drama series Oo Yin Mhu Phit Phu Chin The alongside Kyaw Hsu, Hein Htet and Poe Kyar Phyu Khin. In 2018, she starred in drama series A Yake as the character A Mar Nyo alongside Nat Khat, May Myint Mo, Hein Htet (actor) and Nan Sandar Hla Htun. In the same year, she starred in comedy series Thermometer alongside Phone Set Thwin and So Pyay Myint.

In 2019, she starred in comedy series Lay Sone Twal alongside Phone Set Thwin, So Pyay Myint and Khant Thiri Zaw. In the same year, she starred in drama series Hnin Si as the character Hnin alongside Ye Aung and Si Thu Win.

== Political activities ==
Following the 2021 Myanmar coup d'état, she participated in the anti-coup movement both in person at rallies and through social media. Denouncing the military coup, she took part in protests, starting in February. She joined the "We Want Justice" three-finger salute movement. The movement was launched on social media, and many celebrities have joined the movement.

On 15 April 2021, warrants for her arrest were issued under Section 505 (a) of the penal code by the State Administration Council for speaking out against the military coup. Along with several other celebrities, she was charged with calling for participation in the Civil Disobedience Movement (CDM) and damaging the state's ability to govern, with supporting the Committee Representing Pyidaungsu Hluttaw, and with generally inciting the people to disturb the peace and stability of the nation.

== Filmography ==
=== Film (Cinema) ===
- ကိုယ်စောင့်နတ်(2018)
- ယတြာ(2018)
- တော်တော်ဖြစ်နေလား(2018)
- ကာလာစုံမှတ်တမ်း(2022)
- ဆူးပေးတဲ့ဆု(2024)
- အပိုင်စား(2024)

=== Television series ===
- Flowers & Butterflies (2013)
- Happy Beach (2013)
- Eain Nee Chin (အိမ်နီးချင်း) (2015)
- Sone See Chin Moe Tain Myar (ဆုံစည်းခြင်းမိုးတိမ်များ) (2017)
- Oo Yin Mhu Phit Phu Chin The (ဥယျာဉ်မှူးဖြစ်ဖူးချင်သည်) (2017)
- A Yake (အရိပ်) (2018)
- Thermometer (သာမိုမီတာ) (2018)
- Lay Sone Twal (လေးစုံတွဲ) (2019)
- Rose (နှင်းဆီ) (2019)
- Nga Na Mal Ta Khar Yut Taing Poe Soe Pat Sat Khan Sar Say Ya Mal (ငါ့နာမည်တစ်ခါရွတ်တိုင်းပိုးစိုးပက်စက်ခံစားစေရမယ်) (2022)
- Chit Mi Tot Lae Zoot (ချစ်မိတော့လည်းဇွတ်) (2023)
