= Hein Htet (actor) =

Burmese actor

- ဟိန်းထက်
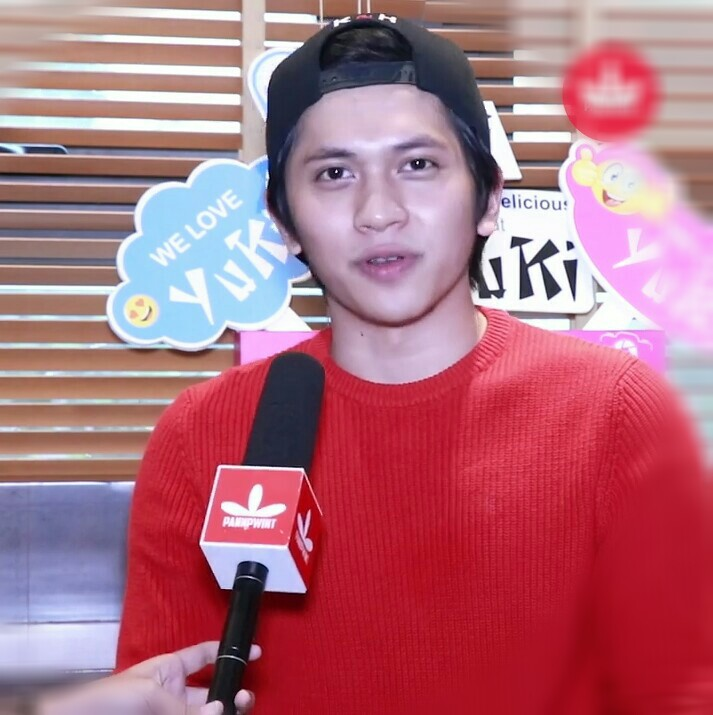
- Born: Arkar Hein; June 8, 1997 (age 29); Yangon, Myanmar
- Education: Dagon University
- Occupations: Actor, model
- Years active: 2015–present

Hein Htet (Burmese: ဟိန်းထက်; born Arkar Hein 8 June 1997) is a Burmese television and film actor. He is best known for his roles in television series A Yake (2018), The Seven Banknotes (2019), Tatiya Myaut Sone Mat (2019), Late Pyar Hnaung Kyo (2019) and G Hall Thu (2020).

== Early life and education ==
Hein Htet was born on June 8, 1997, in Yangon, Myanmar. He attended at Aung San Thuriya Hla Thaung Tatmataw High School, Mingalardon in 2013. He graduated with a degree BSc Philosophy from Dagon University in 2019.

== Career ==
He started his career from attending Star & Model In't from 2014 to 2015. In 2016, he co-starred in his debut MRTV-4 comedy series Ko Lu Pyo alongside Phone Set Thwin, May Mi Ko Ko, May Akari Htoo and Shwe Sin Wint Shein. In 2017, he starred in comedy-drama series Ma Ma Htake and Heritage House alongside Khine Thin Kyi, Poe Kyar Phyu Khin, Mone, May Akari Htoo and Su Waddy. In the same year, he starred in Chit Khun Chway Thi Chit Thu Si, episode of drama series Than Sin Myar Phit Phwae Thi Thaw alongside Myat Thu Thu. In the same year, he starred in drama series Oo Yin Mhu Phit Phu Chin The alongside Kyaw Hsu, Poe Kyar Phyu Khin and Khay Sett Thwin.

In 2018, he starred in drama series A Yake as the character Nyi Lin Nyo alongside Nat Khat, May Myint Mo, Nan Sandar Hla Htun, Khay Sett Thwin and May Mi Ko Ko. In 2019, he starred the main role Aung Wai, in the drama series The Seven Banknotes alongside Nan Sandar Hla Htun and Thi Ha. In the same year, he starred in action series Tatiya Myaut Sone Mat as the character Say Ta Man alongside Myat Thu Thu and Shin Mway La. In the same year, he starred in horror drama series Late Pyar Hnaung Kyo as the character La Yake Htoo alongside Mone, May Mi Ko Ko and Thi Ha.

In 2020, he starred the main role Ko Yin Maung, in the comedy-drama series G Hall Thu alongside May Mi Ko Ko.

== Filmography ==
- 8 Second Silent

=== Television series ===
- Ko Lu Pyo (2016)
- Lu Yee Chun (2016)
- Ma Ma Htake and Heritage House (2016)
- Than Sin Myar Phit Phwae Thi Thaw (Chit Khun Chway Thi Chit Thu Si) (2017)
- Oo Yin Mhu Phit Phu Chin The (2017)
- A Yake (2018)
- The Seven Banknotes (2019)
- Tatiya Myaut Sone Mat (2019)
- Late Pyar Hnaung Kyo (2019)
- G Hall Thu (2020)
