= The Seven Banknotes =

Burmese television series

- Burmese: ငွေစက္ကူ၇ရွက်
- Genre: Thriller; Drama
- Based on: The Seven Banknotes by Lu Nay
- Screenplay by: The Khit Nay; Lu Nay; Kyaung Taw Thar
- Directed by: The Khit Nay
- Starring: Hein Htet; Nan Sandar Hla Htun; Mya Hnin Yee Lwin; Thi Ha
- Theme music composer: Han Nay Tar (ဟန်နေတာ)
- Country of origin: Myanmar
- Original language: Burmese
- No. of episodes: 20

Production
- Executive producer: Khin Lay
- Producers: Naing Than; Kaung Zan; Wyne Shwe Yan Lin
- Production location: Myanmar
- Cinematography: Ye Myat Naing
- Editor: Zin Min Phyo
- Running time: 40 minutes Mondays to Fridays at 19:00 (MMT)
- Production company: Taurus V Production

Original release
- Network: MRTV-4
- Release: 18 July – 14 August 2019

The Seven Banknotes (Burmese: ငွေစက္ကူ၇ရွက်) is a 2019 Burmese thriller drama television series. It aired on MRTV-4, from July 18 to August 14, 2019, on Mondays to Fridays at 19:00 for 20 episodes.

== Synopsis ==
A set of seven bloodstained banknotes intertwined with a karmic curse is said to trigger a chain of fatal consequences for anyone who uses them. As money passes through different hands, it exposes the raw greed, dark desires, and moral corruption of various individuals. When the seven banknotes are handed into possession of Aung Wai, the curse does not affect him. However, the authorities begins to suspect his links to the deaths whilst Aung Wai races to uncover the dark origin of the curse that appears to have connection to his missing sister.

== Cast ==
=== Main ===
- Hein Htet as Aung Wai
- Nan Sandar Hla Htun as Tha Ra Phi
- Mya Hnin Yee Lwin as Wai Hnin Phyu
- Thi Ha as Deputy Sheriff Thura Htun

=== Supporting ===
- Zin Wine as U Min Khant
- Ye Aung as U Kyaw Khaung
- Aung Khant Mue as Lwin Min
- Ju Jue Kay as Jue Jue
- Nay Yee as Pearl
