= The Beloved (TV series) =

Burmese television series

- Poster
- Burmese: ချစ်လှစွာသော
- Genre: Drama
- Based on: My Dear Heart
- Screenplay by: Mae Min Bon; Hay Mar San; Yamin Phyo Wai
- Directed by: Ei Ei Khine
- Starring: Sithu Win; Wint Yamone Naing; Zin Wine; Moht Moht Myint Aung; Myat Hmue Wadi Kyaw (child actress); Phone Myint Myat (child actor); May Sue Maung; Lin Myat
- Opening theme: "Lu Thar San Lite Par" by Wai Gyi
- Ending theme: "Lu Thar San Lite Par" by Wai Gyi
- Composer: Wai Gyi
- Country of origin: Myanmar
- Original language: Burmese
- No. of episodes: 78

Production
- Producer: Khun Mai Aung
- Cinematography: Alma Dela Peña
- Editor: May Oo Myint
- Running time: 40 minutes Mondays to Fridays at 19:00 (MMT)
- Production company: Niyyayana Entertainment

Original release
- Network: MRTV-4
- Release: September 19, 2023 – January 5, 2024

The Beloved (Burmese: ချစ်လှစွာသော) is a Burmese drama television series directed by Ei Ei Khine starring Sithu Win, Wint Yamone Naing, Zin Wine, Moht Moht Myint Aung, Myat Hmue Wadi Kyaw (child actress), Phone Myint Myat (child actor), May Sue Maung and Lin Myat. It is an official remake of the 2017 Filipino television series My Dear Heart which aired on ABS-CBN. It was produced by Niyyayana Entertainment and edited by May Oo Myint.

It aired on the state-run channel MRTV-4 from September 19, 2023 to January 5, 2024, on Mondays to Fridays at 19:00 for 78 episodes.

The press show of this series which was filmed and presented as a collaboration between the two countries to commemorate the 67th anniversary of Myanmar-Philippines friendship was held on September 15, 2023, at the Amarapura Hall of the Wyndham Grand Yangon Hotel in Yangon.

== Plot ==
60-year-old Dr. Daw Myat Thu Kha Maung is smart, proud, and spiteful and a famous heart surgeon in Myanmar. She is trying to become the number one hospital in Myanmar by establishing a specialist hospital called Royal Thukha. Dr. Htun Myat Thar and his son Dr. Myat Zaw from Htun Specialist Hospital, who are rivals of Royal Thukha, are always watching Daw Myat Thukha Maung's activities and always trying to defeat Royal Thukha. In fact, Htun Specialist Hospital is the number one hospital in Myanmar, even better than Royal Hospital. However, Dr. Myat Thukha Maung, the director of Royal Health, and U Tun Myat Thar, the leading patron of Htun Hospital, became rivals due to past grudges. Dr. Daw Myat Thu Kha Maung also has a daughter named Thae Thu Kha Maung. Thae Thukha Maung is also a smart and spiteful doctor. Thae Thukha Maung and Zay Yar Maung had a daughter in the past, who was lost because of Daw Myat Thukha Maung. That's why Thae Thukha Maung resented her mother, Daw Myat Thukha Maung. Zay Yar Maung married Jue Thinzar and adopted Thae Tone. Jue Thinzar loved Thae Tone like a biological daughter. Thae Thukha Maung was giving medical treatment to Thae Tone, who was in a coma, but she did not know that she was her biological daughter.

During Thae Tone in a coma, her spirit met and talked with Daw Myat Thukha Maung. Only Daw Myat Thukha Maung could see Thae Tone's spirit and Phoe Di couldn't see her spirit, but he could hear her voice. Later, Thae Thukha Maung found out that Thae Tone is her biological daughter and she took more care of her. So, Jue Thinzar was worried that Thae Tone would not love her anymore. She calmed down when she learned that Thae Tone loved both of her mothers. Then they knew that the spirit of Thae Tone was with them. Myat Zaw tried to kill Thae Tone, but failed. On the same day Thae Tone woke up from a coma, Dr. Daw Myat Thukha Maung was killed by Myat Zaw. Later, Thae Tone went to see Myat Zaw in prison and told him that she forgave Myat Zaw who tried to kill her. Then, Thae Thukha sent Thae Tone back to Zay Yar Maung and Jue Thinzar. In the end, Zay Ya Maung and Jue Thinzar lived happily with Thae Tone ever after.

== Cast ==
=== Main ===
- Sithu Win as Zay Yar Maung
- Wint Yamone Naing as Thae Thukha Maung
- Zin Wyne as Dr. U Htun Myat Thar
- Moht Moht Myint Aung as Dr. Daw Myat Thukha Maung
- Myat Hmue Wadi Kyaw (child actress) as Thae Tone
- Phone Myint Myat (child actor) as Phoe Di
- May Sue Maung as Jue Thinzar
- Lin Myat as Dr. Myat Zaw

=== Supporting ===
- Soe Moe Kyi as Daw Myo Thinzar
- Zin Myo as U Kyaw Zay Ya
- Zu Zu Zan as Kay Thi
- Phyo Yazar Naing as Dr. Htoo Min
- Shwe Zin Wint Shein as Chue Thinzar
- Than Zin See Sar as Chue Thinzar
- Su Wadi as Shwe Toke
- Nyi Nanda as Dr. Thukha Maung
- Kaung Myat as Min Nyi
- Mann Hein as Lwin Htoo
- Han Htet Zan as Htun Naung
- A Za Ra as Zaw Zaw
- Sett Yan Naing as Htun Kyaw
- Htoo Pyi Aung as Dr. Phyo Kyaw
