= Nway Kandar Oo =

Burmese television series

- Poster
- Burmese: နွေကန္တာဦး
- Genre: Drama
- Based on: Nway Kandar Oo by Tekkatho Phone Naing
- Screenplay by: Nay Chi Aung Thit
- Directed by: Zabyu Htun Thet Lwin
- Starring: Sithu Win; Phyu Thant Chaw
- Country of origin: Myanmar
- Original language: Burmese
- No. of episodes: 18

Production
- Executive producer: Khin Lay
- Production location: Myanmar
- Running time: 40 minutes Mondays to Fridays at 19:00 (MMT)
- Production company: Myanmar Magic Media

Original release
- Network: MRTV-4
- Release: 5 April – 30 April 2018

Nway Kandar Oo (Burmese: နွေကန္တာဦး) is a 2018 Burmese drama television series. It aired on MRTV-4, from April 5 to 30, 2018, on Mondays to Fridays at 19:00 for 18 episodes.

== Cast ==
- Sithu Win as Hnin Ngwe
- Phyu Thant Chaw as Nu Nu Nge
- Ye Aung as U Myat Min
- Htun Eaindra Bo as Daw Thaung Nu
- Aung Paing as Ba Khet
- Nan Shwe Yi as Nyunt May
- Mya Hnin Yee Lwin as Moe Thu
- Thuta Aung as Thar Kyaw
- Lu Mone as U Lay Kan
- Shwe Eain Min as Sein Gwat
- Kyaw Thet Wai
- Khin Moht Moht Aye
