= Toxic (TV series) =

Burmese television series

- Poster
- Burmese: အဆိပ်သွေး
- Genre: Thriller, Horror
- Created by: Canal+ (Myanmar)
- Directed by: Htut Tin Htun
- Starring: Kyaw Hsu; Mone; Min Oo; Moht Moht Myint Aung; Mya Hnin Yee Lwin; Thi Ha; Sithu Win; May Mi Ko Ko; Min Phone Myat
- Country of origin: Myanmar
- Original language: Burmese
- No. of seasons: 2
- No. of episodes: 24

Production
- Production location: Myanmar
- Running time: 40 minutes
- Production company: Canal+ (Myanmar)

Original release
- Network: Canal+ Zat Lenn
- Release: 3 May 2018 – 18 April 2019

Toxic (Burmese: အဆိပ်သွေး) is a Burmese zombie horror thriller television series. It aired on Canal+ Zat Lenn, on every Thursday at 20:00. Its season 1 aired from May 3 to July 19, 2018 for 12 episodes and season 2 aired from January 31 to April 18, 2019 for 12 episodes.

This series follows a group of researchers searching for cure and also surviving against unexpected zombie apocalypse happening in nearby village.

== Cast ==
- Kyaw Hsu as Eant Maw
- Mone as Poe Ei Thway
- Min Oo as U Nay Phone Naing
- Moht Moht Myint Aung as Daw Yee Yee Myint
- Mya Hnin Yee Lwin as Ruby Khin
- Thi Ha as Ye Phone Khaung
- Sithu Win as Ja Wah
- May Mi Ko Ko as Yain
- Min Phone Myat as Min Aung Myin
