= Forever Mandalay =

Burmese television series

- Forever Mandalay Poster
- Burmese: ထာဝရမန္တလေး
- Genre: Drama
- Screenplay by: Nyein Min
- Directed by: Nyein Min
- Starring: Aung Min Khant; Chue Lay; Nay Aung; Moht Moht Myint Aung; May Than Nu; May Thinzar Oo; Han Lin Thant; May Mi Kyaw Kyaw; Aung Yay Chan; Nat Khat
- Composers: Shwe Jaw Jaw (ရွှေဂျော်ဂျော်); Myint Moe Aung (မြင့်မိုးအောင်)
- Country of origin: Myanmar
- Original language: Burmese
- No. of episodes: 43

Production
- Executive producers: Mr.Brian L.Marcar; Khin Lay
- Producers: Naing Than; Soe Thura
- Production location: Myanmar
- Running time: 30 minutes Mondays to Fridays at 19:15 (MMT)
- Production company: Forever Bec-Tero

Original release
- Network: MRTV-4
- Release: 10 February – 9 April 2014

Forever Mandalay (Burmese: ထာဝရမန္တလေး) is a 2014 Burmese drama television series. It is a story of Mandalay. It aired on MRTV-4, from February 10 to April 9, 2014, on Mondays to Fridays at 19:15 for 43 episodes.

== Synopsis ==
A beautifully filmed story about a young grandson's journey to find his grandfather's childhood sweetheart who recently returns to Myanmar from abroad, in order to give his grandfather's gift to the woman he loved as a child, as per his grandfather's last wish.

== Cast ==
=== Main ===
- Aung Min Khant as Phone Moe Thun
- Chue Lay as Ngwe Yi Hnin Sat
- Nay Aung as U Phone Kyaw Shein, grandfather of Phone Moe Thun
- Moht Moht Myint Aung as Daw Khin Hnin Si. Her other name is Daw Khin Khin Oo.
- Han Lin Thant as young adult Phone Kyaw Shein
- May Mi Kyaw Kyaw as young adult Khin Hnin Si
- May Than Nu as Daw Khin Hnin Yi, mother of Ngwe Yi Hnin Sat
- May Thinzar Oo as Daw Thet Htar Nyo, grandmother of Phone Moe Thun
- Myat Thu Thu as Mar Lar
- Aung Yay Chan as Tay Zar Aung
- Nat Khat as Nay Soe Moe
- Ju Jue Kay as Poe Ngon Phu, Poe Poe

=== Supporting ===
- Zin Myo as Zaw Htet
- Kyaw Hsu as Kyaw Mya
- Kyaw Htet as Wunna
- Zu Zu Zan as Yamin Khin
- Lin Myat as Chit Thaw
- Sai Nay Phyo as Ye Naung
- Khin Sandar Myint as Aye Hla
- Than Than Soe as Daw Shwe Win Yee
- Zaw Win Naing as U Kyaw Mya
- Eant Min Nyo as Kyaw Yee
- War War Aung as Daw Khin Thitsar
- Mone as Toe Toe
- Chit Sa Yar as U Thein Aung
- Lu Mone as U Tin Maung Shein
- Aung Khaing
