= Ma Kyay Si =

2022 Burmese television series

- Burmese: မကြေးစည်
- Genre: Drama
- Based on: Ma Kyay Si (comic) by Min Thike
- Screenplay by: Nyi Aung Nyi; Hay Mar San; Min Yu
- Directed by: Aung Ba Power
- Starring: Nat Khat; May Mi Ko Ko; Mayn Hein; Hein Yatu; Lin Myat; Thura Maung Cho; Khoon Nay Chi Cho; Shin Min Sett; Sharr; Su Sandi Yoon; Hsu Waddy
- Theme music composer: Aung Ba Power
- Opening theme: "Kyay Si" by Han Htoo Zen
- Country of origin: Myanmar
- Original language: Burmese
- No. of episodes: 32

Production
- Executive producer: Khin Lay
- Producers: Naing Than; Maung Thi
- Editor: Su Myat Hlaing
- Running time: 40 minutes Mondays to Fridays at 19:00 (MMT)
- Production company: Myanmar Magic Media

Original release
- Network: MRTV-4
- Release: February 3 – March 18, 2022

Ma Kyay Si (Burmese: မကြေးစည်) is a 2022 Burmese drama television series. The series was the last creation of director Aung Ba Power. It is an adaptation of the comic book "Ma Kyay Si" by Min Thike. It aired on MRTV-4, from February 3 to March 18, 2022, on Mondays to Fridays at 19:00 for 32 episodes.

== Synopsis ==
Baby Ma Kyay Si was found at Shwe Kye Si Pagoda. The villagers of Thongpanhla believe that Ma Kyay Si came from the nest believing the words of a fool. She was accused of being an evil spirit and bullied by Moe Wah, San San and Thazin. But only Ba Thet Shay, her adoptive mother; Daw Wah, and fool Pauk Kyi loved her. One day she fell in love with Min Naing. Min Naing died because of the fortune teller's snake. Then she fell in love with Aye Lwin and went to his house to get married. Aye Lwin's lower body died in a car accident. They then drove the Ma Kyay Si out of the village, calling her a bad omen. She fell in love with and married Kyaw Htin from Nyaung Kyat village. At first it was okay, but later Kyaw Htin's father, U Kyaw Pe believed U Lun Tin's words and thought that Ma Kye Si was an evil spirit. U Kyaw Pe later asked Ma Kye Si to sign a divorce agreement and evict her. She then met with historian Wai Lin Maung. Wai Lin Maung has a girlfriend and her name is Nway. Ma Kyay Si got a job at Nway's hotel in Bagan. Later, Kyaw Htin went insane because Ma Kyay Si did not return to him, and Ma Kyay Si was shot dead by Kyaw Pe.

== Cast ==
- Nat Khat as Wai Lin Maung
- May Mi Ko Ko as Ma Kyay Si
- Hein Yatu as Kyaw Htin
- Lin Myat as Min Naing
- Thura Maung Cho as Aye Lwin
- Khoon Nay Chi Cho as Moe Wah
- Shin Min Sett as Thazin
- Sharr as San San
- Su Sandi Yoon as May Kha
- Hsu Waddy as Nway
- Nyi Nyi Min Htet as U Kyaw Pe
- Lu Mone as Ba Thet Shay
- Daung Wai as U Loon Tin
- Kan Pwint as Pauk Kyi
- Man Hein as Than Lone
