= Kyun Taw A Mone Sone Kyun Taw =

Burmese television series

- Poster
- Burmese: ကျွန်တော်အမုန်းဆုံးကျွန်တော်
- Genre: Drama
- Based on: Kyun Taw A Mone Sone Kyun Taw by Le Dwin Thar Saw Chit
- Screenplay by: Aung Nay Ko Ko; Nilar Shein; Khine Zun Wint; Nay Myo Aung
- Directed by: Kyi Min Htun (ကြည်မင်းထွန်း)
- Starring: Nat Khat; Nan Sandar Hla Htun; Nay Yee Win Lai
- Theme music composer: Za War (ဇဝါ)
- Opening theme: Hatest (အမုန်းဆုံး)
- Ending theme: Hatest (အမုန်းဆုံး)
- Country of origin: Myanmar
- Original language: Burmese
- No. of episodes: 26

Production
- Executive producer: Khin Lay
- Producers: Naing Than; Hla Phyo
- Production location: Myanmar
- Cinematography: Ko Ko Win
- Editors: Zin Min Pyo; Zin Min Htut
- Running time: 40 minutes everyday at 20:45 (MMT)
- Production company: Forever Group

Original release
- Network: MRTV-4
- Release: 13 February – 11 March 2020

Kyun Taw A Mone Sone Kyun Taw (Burmese: ကျွန်တော်အမုန်းဆုံးကျွန်တော်; lit. 'The Me I Hate the Most') is a 2020 Burmese drama television series. It is based on the popular novel with the same name written by Le Dwin Thar Saw Chit. It aired on MRTV-4, from February 13 to March 11, 2020, at 20:45 for 26 episodes.

== Synopsis ==
In the face of hardship, the wife's unwavering support and the sacrifices made to keep the family together led him to become an educated individual capable of pursuing his goals and finally support his growing family. However, what happens when he lets his feelings to take control of his life?

== Cast ==
=== Main ===
- Nat Khat as Soe Naing
- Nan Sandar Hla Htun as Aye Phyu, wife of Soe Naing
- Nay Yee Win Lai as Yinn Mar
- Kaung Myat as Ko Thaung Myint
- Zwe Wai Yan Htoo (child actor) as Mg Pyone, son of Soe Naing and Aye Phyu

=== Supporting ===
- Thar Htet Nyan Zaw as Myat Thit
- Su Sandi Yoon as Hnin Wai
- Kaung Set Naing as Ko Ko Naing, elder brother of Yinn Mar
- Zin Wine as father of Yinn Mar
- Than Than Soe as mother of Aye Phyu
- Khin Moht Moht Aye as mother of Soe Naing
- Min Khant as Htun Htun, younger brother of Soe Naing

== Production ==
=== Music ===
A music video and a full version of the Kyun Taw A Mone Sone Kyun Taw theme song, "A Mone Sone", was released in 2020, written by Za War and recorded by G Latt. In 2026, it was produced as a promotional single by FG Entertainment.
