= Kyain Sar Pyal Dan Dar Yee =

Burmese television series

- Poster
- Burmese: ကျိန်စာပြယ်ဒဏ္ဍာရီ
- Genre: Drama
- Directed by: Thein Han
- Starring: Shin Mway La; May Sue Maung; Khant; Ye Aung; Soe Myat Thuzar; Khine Hnin Wai; Lin Myat; Hsu Htet Hlaing; Shin Min Set; Hein Yatu; Phyo Yazar Naing; Htet Myat
- Country of origin: Myanmar
- Original language: Burmese
- No. of episodes: 29

Production
- Production location: Myanmar
- Running time: 40 minutes Mondays to Fridays at 20:45 (MMT)
- Production company: Niyyayana Production

Original release
- Network: MRTV-4
- Release: 10 September – 18 October 2018

Kyain Sar Pyal Dan Dar Yee (Burmese: ကျိန်စာပြယ်ဒဏ္ဍာရီ) is a 2018 Burmese drama television series. It aired on MRTV-4, from September 10 to October 18, 2018, on Mondays to Fridays at 20:45 for 29 episodes.

== Cast ==
- Shin Mwe La as Thaw Thaw Sit
- May Sue Maung as Khoon Cho Kha
- Khant as Thoon Cho Thar
- Ye Aung as U Khant Htun
- Soe Myat Thuzar as Sayama Gyi
- Khine Hnin Wai as Daw Cho Cho
- Lin Myat as Oakkar
- Hsu Htet Hlaing as May Min Myat
- Shin Min Set as Jue Jue
- Hein Yatu as Ko Thet
- Phyo Yazar Naing as Ko Ko Kyaw
