= Late Pyar Hnaung Kyo =

Burmese television series

- Poster
- Burmese: လိပ်ပြာနှောင်ကြိုး
- Genre: Horror; Drama
- Screenplay by: Khin Sabal Hlaing; Paing Soe Thu Maung; Min Thaw Say
- Directed by: Thapthep Paprach
- Starring: Hein Htet; Mone; May Mi Ko Ko; Thi Ha
- Country of origin: Myanmar
- Original language: Burmese
- No. of episodes: 30

Production
- Executive producers: Brian L.Marcar; Khin Lay
- Producers: Naing Than; Nyi Nyi Naing
- Production location: Myanmar
- Editor: Hsu Hsu Lwin
- Running time: 40 minutes Mondays to Fridays at 20:45 (MMT)
- Production company: Forever Bec-Tero

Original release
- Network: MRTV-4
- Release: 21 November 2019 – 2 January 2020

Late Pyar Hnaung Kyo (Burmese: လိပ်ပြာနှောင်ကြိုး) is a Burmese horror drama television series. It was banned from watching series under the age of 13. It aired on MRTV-4, from November 21, 2019, to January 2, 2020, on Mondays to Fridays at 20:45 for 30 episodes.

== Cast ==
=== Main ===
- Hein Htet as La Yake Htoo
- Mone as Tayar
- May Mi Ko Ko as Juri
- Thi Ha as Oakkar

=== Supporting ===
- Wyne Shwe Yi as Kay Thi
- Khin Thaw Tar San as Mahaythi
- Wai Yan Kyaw as Naing Win
- May Kabyar as Ma Ma Moe
- Pyay Zin as Ye Khaung
- Mya Hnin Yee Lwin as Daw May Kha
