= Better Tomorrow (TV series) =

Burmese television series

- Burmese: ပို၍လှသောမနက်ဖြန်
- Genre: Drama
- Directed by: Nyein Min
- Starring: Yan Aung; Nay Myo Aung; Aung Min Khant; Aung Yay Chan; Nat Khat; Chue Lay; May Thinzar Oo; Ju Jue Kay
- Theme music composer: Myint Moe Aung
- Country of origin: Myanmar
- Original language: Burmese
- No. of episodes: 25

Production
- Executive producer: Khin Lay
- Producers: Naing Than; Soe Thura
- Production location: Myanmar
- Editors: Aye Su Su Lwin; Hnin Nway Oo Hlaing; Honey Lin
- Running time: 30 minutes Mondays to Fridays at 19:15 (MMT)
- Production company: Forever Bec-Tero

Original release
- Network: MRTV-4
- Release: 12 October – 15 November 2016

Better Tomorrow (Burmese: ပို၍လှသောမနက်ဖြန်) is a 2016 Burmese drama television series. It aired on MRTV-4, from October 12 to November 15, 2016, on Mondays to Fridays at 19:15 for 25 episodes.

== Cast ==
- Aung Min Khant as Mr. Happy, Mg Wann Thar
- Aung Yay Chan as N Mai Kha, Mg Wann Thar
- Nat Khat as Eaint Muu Naing, Mg Wann Thar
- Chue Lay as Ma Net Phyan
- Yan Aung as Paing Thitsar, Min Kan Si
- Nay Myo Aung as Zaw Loon
- May Thinzar Oo as Shwe Mya Nandar
- Ju Jue Kay as Sue Hnin Si
