= A Lin Htae Ka Lu =

Burmese television series

- Burmese: အလင်းထဲကလူ
- Genre: Action; Drama
- Screenplay by: Hein Zaw Oo; Hsu Hsu Sabal Phu
- Directed by: Adsajun Sattagovit
- Starring: Si Phyo; Mone; San Toe Naing; Shin Min Set; Ju Jue Kay
- Theme music composer: Wai Gyi
- Country of origin: Myanmar
- Original language: Burmese

Production
- Executive producers: Brian L.Marcar; Khin Lay
- Producers: Naing Than; Nyi Nyi Naing
- Production location: Myanmar
- Editors: Zin Min Phyo; Than Htun Win
- Running time: 40 minutes Mondays to Fridays at 20:45 (MMT)
- Production company: Forever Bec-tero

Original release
- Network: MRTV-4
- Release: 20 May – 28 June 2019

A Lin Htae Ka Lu (Burmese: အလင်းထဲကလူ) is a 2019 Burmese action drama television series. It aired on MRTV-4, from May 20 to June 28, 2019, on Mondays to Fridays at 20:45 for 30 episodes.

== Cast ==
=== Main ===
- Si Phyo as Si Phyo
- Mone as Mya Thway Chal
- San Toe Naing as Arkar Min
- Shin Min Set as Htar Shin
- Ju Jue Kay as Yamin Phyo

=== Supporting ===
- Kyaw Htet as Thaung Yee
- Thuta Aung as Wanna
- Aung San Htut as Naing Win
- Sharr as Kauk Kauk
- Aung Khant Muu as Thone Nya
