= Chit Ya Par Thaw Nway =

Burmese television series

- Burmese: ချစ်ရပါသောနွေ
- Genre: Drama
- Screenplay by: Moe Hein June; Aung Nay Ko Ko
- Directed by: Nay Paing (နေပိုင်)
- Starring: Nat Khat; Chue Lay; Thar Htet Nyan Zaw; Khun Nay Chi Cho; Aung Paing; Mike Mike; Han Na Lar; Wai Yan Kyaw
- Theme music composer: Za War (ဇဝါ)
- Opening theme: School guest (ကျောင်းဧည့်သည်)
- Ending theme: School guest (ကျောင်းဧည့်သည်)
- Country of origin: Myanmar
- Original language: Burmese
- No. of episodes: 20

Production
- Executive producer: Khin Lay
- Producers: Naing Than; Hla Phyo
- Production location: Myanmar
- Editors: Than Htun Win; Zin Min Htut
- Running time: 40 minutes Mondays to Fridays at 19:00 (MMT)
- Production company: Forever Group

Original release
- Network: MRTV-4
- Release: 19 June – 16 July 2019

Chit Ya Par Thaw Nway (Burmese: ချစ်ရပါသောနွေ) is a 2019 Burmese drama television series. It is a story of Mandalay University. It aired on MRTV-4, from June 19 to July 16, 2019 on Mondays to Fridays at 19:00 for 20 episodes.

== Cast ==
=== Main ===
- Nat Khat as Paing Thu
- Chue Lay as Chit Nway
- Thar Htet Nyan Zaw as D Kyaw Khaung
- Khun Nay Chi Cho as Wut Hmone Thin, girlfriend of D Kyaw Khaung
- Mike Mike as Nga Bat Mway
- Han Na Lar as Bumi Mu Yar, girlfriend of Nga Bat Mway

=== Supporting ===
- Aung Paing as Ko Oo
- Wai Yan Kyaw as Pa Lar Tar
- Ju Jue Pan Htwar as Hnin Yu, elder sister of Chit Nway
- Phone Shein Khant as Yar Yar Ma
- Mann Thaw Htet as Phoe Ni
- Ye Aung as father of Chit Nway
- May Thinzar Oo as mother of Paing Thu
- Sharr as younger sister of Paing Thu
