= Nway Lal Nya Yae La Min =

Burmese television series

- Poster
- Burmese: နွေလယ်ညရဲ့လမင်း
- Genre: Drama
- Based on: Maung Nway Oo Nae Ma Phoo Wai by Le Dwin Thar Saw Chit
- Screenplay by: Hein Zaw Oo; Thet Zun; Khin Maung Kyaw
- Directed by: Hein Ko Ko
- Starring: Phone Shein Khant; Chue Lay; Than Thar Nyi; Hein Yatu; Net Shine Ko
- Theme music composer: Za War (ဇဝါ)
- Opening theme: Htun Lin Mae La Min (ထွန်းလင်းမယ့်လမင်း)
- Ending theme: Htun Lin Mae La Min (ထွန်းလင်းမယ့်လမင်း)
- Country of origin: Myanmar
- Original language: Burmese
- No. of episodes: 26

Production
- Executive producer: Khin Lay
- Producers: Naing Than; Khun Mai Aung
- Production location: Myanmar
- Editors: May Oo Myint; Khin La Pyae Win
- Running time: 40 minutes Mondays to Fridays at 19:00 (MMT)
- Production company: Niyyayana Production

Original release
- Network: MRTV-4
- Release: 8 November – 13 December 2019

Nway Lal Nya Yae La Min (Burmese: နွေလယ်ညရဲ့လမင်း) is a 2019 Burmese drama television series. It aired on MRTV-4, from November 8 to December 13, 2019, on Mondays to Fridays at 19:00 for 26 episodes.

== Cast ==
- Phone Shein Khant as Nway Oo
- Chue Lay as Soe Sandar
- Than Thar Nyi as Phoo Wai
- Hein Yatu as Kyaw Swar Moe
- Net Shine Ko as Aung Aung
- Khine Thazin Ngu Wah as younger sister of Aung Aung
