= Hubris (TV series) =

Burmese television series

- Burmese: မာန်
- Genre: Drama
- Screenplay by: Shwe Yay Htin Htin
- Directed by: Thein Han
- Starring: Zin Wyne; Ye Aung; Han Lin Thant; Hsaung Wutyee May; May Mi Ko Ko; La Pyae; Lin Myat; Thuta Aung
- Country of origin: Myanmar
- Original language: Burmese
- No. of episodes: 25

Production
- Executive producer: Khin Lay
- Production location: Myanmar
- Running time: 40 minutes Mondays to Fridays at 19:15 (MMT)
- Production company: Niyyayana Production

Original release
- Network: MRTV-4
- Release: 9 August – 13 September 2017

Hubris (Burmese: မာန်) is a 2017 Burmese drama television series. It aired on MRTV-4, from August 9 to September 13, 2017, on Mondays to Fridays at 19:15 for 25 episodes.

== Cast ==
- Zin Wyne as U Htet Zaw
- Ye Aung as U Moe Wai
- Han Lin Thant as Lin Let
- Hsaung Wutyee May as Kyway Kyway
- May Mi Ko Ko as Thaw Thaw
- La Pyae as Aung Maw
- Lin Myat as Kyaw Kyaw
- Thuta Aung as Myat Paing
