= Flowers & Butterflies =

Burmese television series

- Poster
- Genre: Romance; Comedy-drama
- Screenplay by: Hnin Yee Win; Khin Zaw Lwin; Aye Sandar Win; Aye Moht Moht Aung; Kyaw Kyaw Htun; Phoo Pwint Khine
- Directed by: Hla Phyo
- Starring: Kyi Zaw Htet; Khay Sett Thwin; Nat Khat; Khin Sandar Myint; Kyaw Htet; Khine Thazin Oo; Sai Nay Phyo; Eaindray Wint Htal; Kyaw Hsu; Soe Nandar Kyaw; Myat Thu Thu; Zu Zu Zan
- Country of origin: Myanmar
- Original language: Burmese
- No. of seasons: 2
- No. of episodes: 87 (60+27)

Production
- Executive producer: Khin Lay
- Producer: Naing Than
- Production location: Myanmar
- Editors: Aye Su Su Lwin; Theint Thinzar Win; Hnin Nway Oo Hlaing
- Running time: 40 minutes
- Production company: Media Kabar

Original release
- Network: For Comedy Channel
- Release: 11 March 2013 – 13 November 2015

Flowers & Butterflies is a Burmese romantic comedy-drama television series. Its season 1 aired from March 11 to May 31, 2013, and its season 2 aired from October 8 to November 13, 2015, on Mondays to Fridays at 06:00, on For Comedy Channel, channel from 4TV Network.

Its season 1 also aired on Channel 7, from March 18 to June 7, 2013, on Mondays to Fridays at 17:15 for 60 episodes and season 2 aired on MRTV-4, from October 15 to November 20, 2015, on Mondays to Fridays at 19:15 for 27 episodes.

== Cast ==
- Kyi Zaw Htet as Khant Htal Wah
- Khay Sett Thwin as Thadar
- Nat Khat as Kaung Htet Yan
- Khin Sandar Myint as May
- Kyaw Htet as Ye Yint Thu
- Khine Thazin Oo as Sakura
- Sai Nay Phyo as Htut Htake
- Eaindray Wint Htal as Yu Ya Khin
- Kyaw Hsu as Nay Kyar
- Soe Nandar Kyaw as Nyo Mi
- Myat Thu Thu as Rose Angel
- Zu Zu Zan as May Myint Mo
