= Sone See Chin Moe Tain Myar =

Burmese television series

- Burmese: ဆုံစည်းခြင်းမိုးတိမ်များ
- Genre: Thriller; Drama
- Screenplay by: Kyaw Kyaw Htun
- Directed by: Kritsada Imsomboon
- Starring: Sithu Win; May Myint Mo; Khay Sett Thwin; Aung Yay Chan
- Composers: Myint Moe Aung; Wyne Lay
- Country of origin: Myanmar
- Original language: Burmese
- No. of episodes: 43

Production
- Executive producers: Brian L.Marcar; Khin Lay
- Producers: Naing Than; Soe Thura
- Production location: Myanmar
- Editors: Kyaw Kyaw Myint; Myat Hsu Hsu San
- Running time: 40 minutes Mondays to Fridays at 19:15 (MMT)
- Production company: Forever Bec-tero

Original release
- Network: MRTV-4
- Release: 7 June – 7 August 2017

Sone See Chin Moe Tain Myar (Burmese: ဆုံစည်းခြင်းမိုးတိမ်များ) is a 2017 Burmese thriller drama television series. It aired on MRTV-4, from June 7 to August 7, 2017, on Mondays to Fridays at 19:15 for 43 episodes.

== Cast ==
- May Myint Mo as Ngwe La Min. Other life names are Mya Darli, Htake Htar Saw Latt.
- Sithu Win as Thiha Sithu
- Aung Yay Chan as Akarit. Other life name is Datepa.
- Khay Sett Thwin as Hlaine Ei Ei Cho. Other life name is A Saw Min Hla.
- Than Than Soe as Daw Cho
- Min Oo as U Agga Kyaw
- Khine Hnin Wai as Daw Pann Nyo. Other life name is Daw Aozar
- Ju Jue Kay as Sin Shwe War. Other life name is O Kaung Mo
- Zin Myo as Kyaw Min. Other life name is Phoe Tay
- Zaw Oo as Myo Sar Min
