= Lay Sone Twal =

Burmese television series

- Poster
- Burmese: လေးစုံတွဲ
- Genre: Comedy drama
- Screenplay by: Hsu Aww Chal; Nyi Aung Nyi
- Story by: Nyi Sit Nyein
- Directed by: Hein Soe
- Starring: Phone Sett Thwin; Khay Sett Thwin; Aung Lwin; Ayeyar; So Pyay Myint; Khant; Chit Su; Pwint
- Country of origin: Myanmar
- Original language: Burmese
- No. of episodes: 21

Production
- Executive producer: Khin Lay
- Producers: Naing Than; Maung Thi
- Production location: Myanmar
- Editors: Khin Lay Pyae Win; Khin Nandar Win
- Running time: 40 minutes Mondays to Fridays at 19:00 (MMT)
- Production company: Myanmar Magic Media

Original release
- Network: MRTV-4
- Release: 10 April – 8 May 2019

Lay Sone Twal (Burmese: လေးစုံတွဲ) is a 2019 Burmese comedy-drama television series. It aired on MRTV-4, from April 10 to May 8, 2019, on Mondays to Fridays at 19:00 for 21 episodes.

== Cast ==
- Phone Sett Thwin as Kyaw Gyi
- Khay Sett Thwin as Shwe Sin
- Aung Lwin as U Ba Thet
- Ayeyar as U Ayeyar Pyaung
- So Pyay Myint as Sit Aye
- Khant as Hnin Ei Phyu
- Chit Su as Ko Too
- Pwint as Ma Puu
- Lucas as Mg Phone
- Hsu Waddy as Waddy
