= A Yake =

Burmese television series

- Burmese: အရိပ်
- Genre: Drama
- Based on: A Yake by Ma Sandar
- Screenplay by: Aye Kyi Thar Han; Aye Sandar Win; Hsu Hsu Sabal Phu
- Directed by: Pyi Thit Naing
- Starring: Yan Aung; Soe Myat Thuzar; Nat Khat; May Myint Mo; Hein Htet; Khay Sett Thwin; Nan Sandar Hla Htun; Cho Pyone; Kyaw Kyaw; May Mi Ko Ko
- Theme music composer: Za War (ဇဝါ)
- Opening theme: A Yake Myar (အရိပ်များ)
- Ending theme: A Yake Myar (အရိပ်များ)
- Country of origin: Myanmar
- Original language: Burmese
- No. of episodes: 31

Production
- Executive producers: Khin Lay; Khin Lin Maw
- Producers: Naing Than; Soe Thura; Nyi Nyi Naing
- Production location: Myanmar
- Cinematography: Alma Dela Peña
- Editors: Thet Mue Winn; Aye Su Su Lwin
- Running time: 40 minutes Mondays to Fridays at 19:00 (MMT)
- Production company: Forever Group

Original release
- Network: MRTV-4
- Release: 2 May – 12 June 2018

A Yake (Burmese: အရိပ်; lit. 'Shadow') is a 2018 Burmese drama television series. It is based on the eponymous popular novel written by Ma Sandar. It aired on MRTV-4, from May 2 to June 12, 2018, on Mondays to Fridays at 19:00 for 31 episodes.

== Cast ==
=== Main ===
- Yan Aung as U Thar Hlaing, father of Su Su Hlaing
- Soe Myat Thuzar as Telmar, mother of Su Su Hlaing
- May Myint Mo as Su Su Hlaing
- Nat Khat as Kyaw Htun Nyo, elder brother of A Mar Nyo
- Hein Htet as Nyi Lin Nyo, younger brother of A Mar Nyo
- Khay Sett Thwin as A Mar Nyo
- Nan Sandar Hla Htun as Thet Thet
- Kyaw Kyaw as Pauk Kyaing

=== Supporting ===
- Mike Mike as Freddy
- Cho Pyone as Mommy Gyi, grandmother of Su Su Hlaing
- May Mi Ko Ko as Nelly Cho
- Zu Zu Zan as Khin Oo
- So Pyay Myint as Sai Min Aung
- Hein Min Thu as Sai Min Swe
- Goon Pone Gyi as Daw Aye Tin
- Phyo Eaindra Min as Nan Moe Aye
- Daw Nwet Nwet San as May May Gyi, grandmother of A Mar Nyo
- Than Than Soe as mother of A Mar Nyo
- Khin Moht Moht Aye as mother of Thet Thet
