= G Hall Thu =

Burmese television series

- Burmese: ဂျီဟောသူ
- Genre: Comedy drama
- Based on: G Hall Thu by Ma Sandar
- Screenplay by: Aye Kyi Thar Han; Aye Sandar Win; Hsu Hsu Sabal Phu
- Directed by: Htun Htet Arkar Bo
- Starring: Hein Htet; May Mi Ko Ko; Great Chan; Wyne Shwe Yi; Han Na Lar; Phyo Than Thar Cho; Zu Zu Zan; Shwe Sin Wint Shein; Hsu Mon; Phone Set Thwin; Shin Mwe La; Wai Yan Kyaw; La Pyae; Mike Mike; Min Zay; Thura MgCho
- Country of origin: Myanmar
- Original language: Burmese
- No. of episodes: 29

Production
- Executive producer: Khin Lay
- Producers: Naing Than; Hein Htet Aye; Nyi Nyi Naing
- Production location: Myanmar
- Cinematography: Phone Naing
- Editors: Htoo Mon Thet Lwin; Than Htun Win
- Running time: 40 minutes Mondays to Fridays at 19:00 (MMT)
- Production company: Forever Group

Original release
- Network: MRTV-4
- Release: June 19 – July 29, 2020

G Hall Thu (Burmese: ဂျီဟောသူ) is a 2020 Burmese comedy-drama television series. It is a story of Rangoon Institute of Technology (RIT) (now Yangon Technological University (YTU) ) set in 1980s. It aired on MRTV-4, from 19 June to 29 July 2020, on Mondays to Fridays at 19:00 for 29 episodes.

== Synopsis ==
Based on the popular novel G Hall Thu written by Ma Sandar, G is one of the seven dormitories in Rangoon Institute of Technology (RIT) presented in 1980s. The name G hall is given by the student of the G and the female students who accommodate in the dormitory G are called "G Hall Thu".

In this compelling series of comedy, the story explores the lifestyle, conversation style, personality differences and happenstance between a group of female students who have been living together at the G Hall of the university for six years. It is a series that is shown in the background of the university and brings the viewers back into the nostalgic memories of university student life.

== Cast ==
=== Main ===
- Hein Htet as Ko Yin Maung
- May Mi Ko Ko as Nyo Htwe
- Great Chan as Khin Cho
- Wyne Shwe Yi as Htwe Htwe
- Han Na Lar as Ma War
- Phyo Than Thar Cho as Wai Wai
- Zu Zu Zan as Ma Ma Khin
- Shwe Sin Wint Shein as Maw Maw
- Hsu Mon (TV presenter) as Mi Mi Lay
- Phone Set Thwin as Mg Mg San
- Shin Mwe La as Lin Nyo
- La Pyae as Vitta
- Wai Yan Kyaw as Kyaw Oo. His nickname is Datta Gi Ri.
- Thura MgCho as Than Win Aung. His nickname is Khaung Ma Sant.
- Soe Htun Win (TV presenter) as Taw Mi

=== Supporting ===
- Mike Mike as Nyein Wai
- Min Zay as Htet Oo Maung
- Zaw Htet (TV presenter) as Zaw Lin
- Muu Thiha (TV presenter) as Mg Mg
- Eant Win Htut (TV presenter and Chef) as Dr. Aung Htut
- Phyo May San (TV presenter) as Phyu Phyu Khin
- La Won Htet (TV presenter) as Yu Yu Swe
