= Sign of Moe Pan Pwint =

2018 film by Ko Pauk

- Official film poster
- Burmese: မိုးပန်းပွင့်ရဲ့သင်္ကေတ
- Directed by: Ko Pauk
- Screenplay by: A Way Yar Min
- Starring: Han Lin Thant; May Myint Mo; Chue Lay
- Production company: Niyyayana Production
- Distributed by: Forever Group
- Release date: September 14, 2018
- Running time: 120 minutes
- Country: Myanmar
- Language: Burmese

Sign of Moe Pan Pwint (Burmese: မိုးပန်းပွင့်ရဲ့သင်္ကေတ) is a 2018 Burmese drama film starring Han Lin Thant, May Myint Mo and Chue Lay. The film, produced by Niyyayana Production premiered in Myanmar on September 14, 2018.

== Cast ==
- May Myint Mo as Moe Pan Pwint
- Yan Aung as U Ko Ko Htun, Moe Pan Pwint's father
- Soe Myat Thuzar as Daw Khin Moe Thwe
- Han Lin Thant as Aww Zar
- Ye Aung as U Aung Ye Naing, Aww Zar's father
- War War Aung as Daw Kay Thi, Aww Zar's mother
- Chue Lay as Cho Myain
- May Thinzar Oo as Daw May Oo, Cho Myain's mother

== Awards and nominations ==
Year	Award	Category	Nominee	Result
2018	Myanmar Academy Awards	Best Actress in a Supporting Role	Chue Lay	Nominated
2018	Star Awards	Best Actress in a Supporting Role	Chue Lay	Nominated
2018	Star Awards	Best New Actress	Chue Lay	Nominated
2018	Star Awards	Rising Star Award (female)	May Myint Mo	Won
