= Eain Nee Chin =

Burmese television series

- Poster
- Burmese: အိမ်နီးချင်း
- Genre: Comedy drama
- Screenplay by: Lay Lay Laung; Pan Pan
- Directed by: Aung Aww Bar; Kyaw Za
- Starring: Kaung Myat San; Khay Sett Thwin; Moe Di; San San Win; Pwint; Wat Ma; Aye Aye Khine; Kyaw Htoo
- Theme music composer: A Yoe
- Country of origin: Myanmar
- Original language: Burmese
- No. of episodes: 60

Production
- Executive producer: Khin Lay
- Producers: Naing Than; Aung Pyi Soe; May Thu Phay
- Production location: Myanmar
- Editors: Nilar Kyaw; Wai Lin Oo; Phyu Hnin Aung
- Running time: 40 minutes Mondays to Fridays at 19:20 (MMT)
- Production company: Media Kabar

Original release
- Network: MRTV-4
- Release: 23 July – 14 October 2015

Eain Nee Chin (Burmese: အိမ်နီးချင်း; lit. 'Neighbor') is a 2015 Burmese comedy-drama television series. It aired on MRTV-4, from July 23 to October 14, 2015, on Mondays to Fridays at 19:20 for 60 episodes.

== Cast ==
- Kaung Myat San as Zarni Thway
- Khay Sett Thwin as Eaindray Shin
- Moe Di as U Nyat Si
- San San Win as Daw Sein Toke
- Pwint as Thay Thay Thwe
- Wat Ma as U Tine Kyaw
- Aye Aye Khine as Shwe Lone
- Kyaw Htoo as U Yay Chan
- Hsu Waddy as Mu Yar
- Ayeyar as Oakkahta
