= Players (2020 film) =

Burmese Film

- Film Poster
- Burmese: ပလေယာ
- Directed by: Pyi Hein Thiha
- Written by: Thet Oo Maung
- Produced by: Khaing Mar Win
- Starring: Myint Myat; Htun Htun; Tyron Bejay; Khin Hlaing; Soe Myat Thuzar; Ei Chaw Po; May Mi Ko Ko; Hsaung Wutyee May
- Production company: Bo Bo Film Production
- Release date: 6 February 2020
- Running time: 120 minutes
- Country: Myanmar
- Language: Burmese

Players (Burmese: ပလေယာ) is a 2020 Burmese comedy-drama film starring Myint Myat, Htun Htun, Tyron Bejay, Khin Hlaing, Soe Myat Thuzar, Ei Chaw Po, May Mi Ko Ko and Hsaung Wutyee May. The film, produced by Bo Bo Film Production premiered in Myanmar on February 6, 2020.

== Cast ==
- Myint Myat as Min Htun
- Ei Chaw Po as May Thu Kyaw
- May Mi Ko Ko as Myat Sandi Oo
- Khin Hlaing as Kyaw Zin
- Htun Htun as Arkar
- Soe Myat Thuzar as San San Tin
- Aye Chan Maung as Zin Ko
- Joker as Kyaw Zay Yar Toe Khine Lin
- Hsaung Wutyee May as May Tharaphi Kyaw
- Tyron Bejay as Willian
