= Yee Sar Ta Won Kwal =

2018 Burmese film

- Film Poster
- Burmese: ရည်းစားတစ်ဝမ်းကွဲ
- Directed by: Ko Zaw (Ar Yone Oo)
- Screenplay by: Nyar Let Taw
- Based on: Yee Sar Ta Won Kwal by Su Myat Mon Mon
- Starring: Sai Sai Kham Leng; Phway Phway; Mya Hnin Yee Lwin
- Production companies: Frenzo Production; Heart & Soul Film Production
- Release date: December 21, 2018 (Myanmar)
- Running time: 114 minutes
- Country: Myanmar
- Language: Burmese

Yee Sar Ta Won Kwal (Burmese: ရည်းစားတစ်ဝမ်းကွဲ) is a 2018 Burmese romantic-comedy film, directed by Ko Zaw (Ar Yone Oo) starring Sai Sai Kham Leng, Phway Phway and Mya Hnin Yee Lwin. The film, produced by Frenzo Production and Heart & Soul Film Production premiered in Myanmar on December 21, 2018.

== Cast ==
- Sai Sai Kham Leng as Khant Htal Wah
- Phway Phway as Ei Tone, Thel Myintzu Phu Ngone Lin Let
- Mya Hnin Yee Lwin as Annie
