= Thermometer (TV series) =

Burmese television series

- Poster
- Burmese: သာမိုမီတာ
- Genre: Comedy
- Screenplay by: Swe Moe Thet
- Story by: Paluto
- Directed by: Bo Thant
- Starring: Phone Sett Thwin; Khay Sett Thwin; So Pyay Myint; Ayeyar; Kin Kaung
- Country of origin: Myanmar
- Original language: Burmese
- No. of episodes: 20

Production
- Production location: Myanmar
- Running time: 40 minutes Mondays to Fridays at 20:45 (MMT)
- Production company: Myanmar Magic Media

Original release
- Network: MRTV-4
- Release: 21 January – 15 February 2019

Thermometer (Burmese: သာမိုမီတာ) is a 2019 Burmese comedy television series. It aired on MRTV-4, from January 21 to February 15, 2019, on Mondays to Fridays at 20:45 for 20 episodes.

== Cast ==
- Phone Sett Thwin as Thermometer
- Khay Sett Thwin as Phoo Phoo, Wutt Hlwar Phoo Ngone
- So Pyay Myint as Aung Yu Pa
- Ayeyar as Ayeyarwin
- Kin Kaung as Kin Stine
