= Magical Village =

Burmese television series

- Burmese: ပဉ္စလက်ရွာ
- Genre: Thriller
- Based on: Magical Village by Thoe Saung
- Directed by: Thoe Saung
- Starring: Kyaw Thu; Aung Min Khant; Nan Sandar Hla Htun; Chue Lay; Thu Riya
- Country of origin: Myanmar
- Original language: Burmese
- No. of episodes: 25

Production
- Executive producer: Khin Lay
- Producers: Naing Than; Kaung Zan; Wyne Shwe Yan Lin
- Production location: Myanmar
- Running time: 40 minutes Mondays to Fridays at 19:15 (MMT)
- Production company: Taurus V Production

Original release
- Network: MRTV-4
- Release: 14 September – 18 October 2017

Magical Village (Burmese: ပဉ္စလက်ရွာ) is a 2017 Burmese thriller television series. It is based on the popular novel "Magical Village" written by Thoe Saung. It aired on MRTV-4, from September 14 to October 18, 2017, on Mondays to Fridays at 19:15 for 25 episodes.

== Synopsis ==
Somewhere in the center of Myanmar, there lies a small village where magicians are known to have once settled...

After three years of enduring under the curse of endless drought, an unexpected outsider arrived at Koe Chaung village for the first time in a while, shortly before a series of deaths with unknown causes started to arise in the village. Learning that the once peaceful and united village is now surrounded by unfamiliar danger, batches of villagers along with the outsider are forced to unravel hidden secrets and search for answers, all of which the evidence points towards the famous legend of the magical village.

== Cast ==
=== Main ===
- Kyaw Thu as U Mar Ga, highly respected and skillful senior apothecary of Koe Chaung village who secretly practice magic.
- Aung Min Khant as Yoe Sit, an outsider and traveler who came to Koe Chaung village in hope to find his missing father. He became well-known for his unique knowledge in magic.
- Nan Sandar Hla Htun as Yay Wadi, a quiet and benevolent girl whose family is looked down by the villagers for being the generation of the mortician.
- Chue Lay as Sein War, widely known as the daughter of the village chief.
- Thu Riya as Elit, a cemetery keeper and an undisclosed magician who is currently holding the legacy of the mortician.

=== Supporting ===
- Min Thu as U Yu Wa, the village chief of Koe Chaung village who carries the weight of leadership with grace, optimism and sympathy.
- Kaung Sett Naing as Htun Oo, older brother of Htwe Mya.
- Yan Naing Soe as Phoe Aung
- Zin Cho Khine Oo as Than Khin
- Shwe Zin Wint Shein as Htwe Mya, best friend of Sein War and a younger brother of Htun Oo.
- Mike Mike as Phoe Si, love interest of Htwe Mya.
- Htet Myat as Than Khae
- Su Htet Kaday as the mother of Yay Wadi and Elit.
