= Sue Pann Khwai Thwe Bayet Hnint Pay Ywat Leik Nahtaung Sin =

Burmese television series

- Poster
- Burmese: ဆူးပန်းခွေသွယ်ဘယက်နှင့်ပေရွက်လိပ်နားတောင်းဆင်
- Genre: Drama
- Based on: Sue Pann Khwai Thwe Bayet Hnint Pay Ywat Leik Nahtaung Sin by Khin Khin Htoo
- Screenplay by: Zaw Myint Oo
- Directed by: Zaw Myint Oo
- Starring: Khant Sithu; Aung Yay Chan; Khine Thin Kyi; Htun Eaindra Bo
- Theme music composer: Khin Maung Gyi
- Country of origin: Myanmar
- Original language: Burmese
- No. of episodes: 43

Production
- Executive producer: Khin Lay
- Producer: Kha Thone Lone Production
- Production location: Myanmar
- Cinematography: Tint Hsan
- Editor: Kyaw Wanna
- Running time: 40 minutes Mondays to Fridays at 19:00 (MMT)
- Production company: Kha Thone Lone Production

Original release
- Network: MRTV-4
- Release: 13 February – 13 April 2020

Sue Pann Khwai Thwe Bayet Hnint Pay Ywat Leik Nahtaung Sin (Burmese: ဆူးပန်းခွေသွယ်ဘယက်နှင့်ပေရွက်လိပ်နားတောင်းဆင်) is a 2020 Myanmar drama television series. It aired on MRTV-4, from February 13 to April 13, 2020, on Mondays to Fridays at 19:00 for 43 episodes.

== Cast ==
=== Main ===
- Khant Sithu as Kyar Swal
- Aung Yay Chan as Myo Thwin
- Khine Thin Kyi as Pone Yay
- Htun Eaindra Bo as Ma Kyay Myin

=== Supporting ===
- Aye Aye Khaing as Kyar Au
- Myo Myo Khaing as Hla Ohn Mal
- Aye Thidar as Ma Sein
- Aung Khaing as Ko Ba Aung
- War War Aung as Ma Mya War
- Phone Sett Thwin as Mya Thaung
- Shwe Sin Wint Shein as Shwe Yi
- Great Chan as Taing Khin
- Htet Myat as Phone Soe
- Kahtay Phone Thaw as Aww Bar
- Ei Ei Chun as Shwe Au
- Shwe Ao as a monk
- Kaung San as Ko Kwat
- Khin Soe Paing as Daw Kyay Kyoke
- Nga Pyaw Kyaw as Than Chaung
- Nay Htun as U Pann Hsi
