= Mahuyar Pearl =

2023 Burmese television series

- Poster
- Burmese: မဟူရာပုလဲ
- Genre: Drama
- Based on: Midnight Sun of Mahuyar Pearl by La Min Maung Maung (Pyin Oo Lwin)
- Screenplay by: Nyi Aung Nyi; Su Lin Let
- Directed by: Kyaw Soe Thu
- Starring: Aung Yay Chan; May Mi Ko Ko; Hein Yatu; Natt Shine Ko; Hnin; Jue San Thar; Saw La Pyae Won
- Opening theme: "Oh Bal Myittar" by Thar Dee Lu
- Ending theme: "Oh Bal Myittar" by Thar Dee Lu
- Composer: Thar Dee Lu
- Country of origin: Myanmar
- Original language: Burmese
- No. of episodes: 40

Production
- Producer: Hla Phyo
- Production location: Myanmar
- Cinematography: Banyar Maung
- Editor: Su Myat Hlaing
- Running time: 40 minutes Mondays to Fridays at 19:00 (MMT)
- Production company: Forever Group

Original release
- Network: MRTV-4
- Release: February 6 – March 31, 2023

Mahuyar Pearl (Burmese: မဟူရာပုလဲ) is a 2023 Burmese drama television series directed by Kyaw Soe Thu starring Aung Yay Chan, May Mi Ko Ko, Hein Yatu, Hnin, Natt Shine Ko, Jue San Thar and Saw La Pyae Won. It is an adaptation of the novel "Midnight Sun of Mahuyar Pearl" by La Min Maung Maung (Pyin Oo Lwin). It aired on MRTV-4, from February 6 to March 31, 2023, on Mondays to Fridays at 19:00 for 40 episodes.

== Synopsis ==
Thet Oo Maung was hungry for his father's love since he was young. Because his father misunderstood his mother and U Myint and thought that he was not his biological son. When Thet Oo Maung came of age, he fell in love with actress May Yadan Maung and married. But he didn't get the happy family life he wanted. The reason is because Mae Yadanar Maung aborted the baby. Thet Oo Maung took pity on May Yadanar Maung and left her behind. May Yadanar Maung apologized repeatedly, but Thet Oo Maung did not let go. One day, Thet U Maung stole Mya Mya Wai and Jimmy's child and adopted him. Thet Oo Maung knew Jimmy thought that he was not his biological son and he did not care for the child. Because Jimmy mistook Mya Mya Wai for his ex-boyfriend Min Naing.

== Cast ==
- Aung Yay Chan as Thet Oo Maung
- May Mi Ko Ko as Mya Mya Wai
- Hein Yatu as Jimmy Htun
- Natt Shine Ko as Min Naing
- Hnin as May Yadanar Maung
- Jue San Thar as Kay Thi
- Saw La Pyae Won as Cherry
- May Nandar Kyaw as Ma Ma Nwe
- Nyein Chan as Dr. Myo Swe
- Wyne Shwe Yi as Yadanar
- Than Than Soe as Daw Khin Wai
- Min Thu as U Myint Thu
- Khin Moht Moht Aye as Daw May Cho
- Ei Si Kway as Chit Oo Maung
- Eant Min Nyo as Zaw Latt
