= Ko Lu Pyo =

Burmese television series

- poster
- Burmese: ကိုလူပျို
- Genre: Comedy
- Screenplay by: Shwe Moe Thet; Chan Min Eain; Su Aww Chal; Pan; Chit Chaw
- Directed by: Myo Htoo; Ko Thant
- Starring: Phone Sett Thwin; May Mi Ko Ko; May Akari Htoo; Shwe Sin Wint Shein; Kyaw Htoo; Pwint
- Theme music composer: Shwe Pyi Aye
- Country of origin: Myanmar
- Original language: Burmese
- No. of episodes: 60

Production
- Executive producer: Khin Lay
- Producers: Naing Than; Maung Thi
- Production location: Myanmar
- Cinematography: U Myo
- Editors: Cho Cho Myint; Ei Ei Thaw; Zin Min Phyo; Khin Nandar Win
- Running time: 40 minutes Mondays to Fridays at 19:00 (MMT)
- Production company: Myanmar Magic Media

Original release
- Network: MRTV-4
- Release: 7 July – 29 September 2016

Ko Lu Pyo (Burmese: ကိုလူပျို) is a 2016 Burmese comedy television series. It aired on MRTV-4, from 7 July to 29 September 2016, on Mondays to Fridays at 19:00 for 60 episodes.

== Cast ==
=== Main cast ===
- Phone Sett Thwin as Shwe Sar
- May Mi Ko Ko as Thu La Wun
- May Akari Htoo as Kar Yan Cho
- Shwe Sin Wint Shein as May Inzali
- Kyaw Htoo as Myo Myint Aye
- Pwint as Baby Nu

=== Guest cast ===
- Hein Htet as Hein Htet
- Shin Mway La as Shin Mway La
- Thar Htet Nyan Zaw as Thar Htet Nyan Zaw
