= Rose (TV series) =

Burmese television series

- Burmese: နှင်းဆီ
- Genre: Drama
- Based on: Rose by Ma Sandar
- Screenplay by: Aye Kyi Thar Han; Kyaw Kyaw Htun; Cho Myat Mon
- Directed by: Pyi Thit Naing; Htet Naung Htun
- Starring: Sithu Win; Khay Sett Thwin; Kaung Sett Naing; Ye Aung; Shin Mway La; Wai Lar Ri
- Theme music composer: Za War (ဇဝါ)
- Opening theme: Pan Hnin Si (ပန်းနှင်းဆီ)
- Ending theme: Pan Hnin Si (ပန်းနှင်းဆီ)
- Country of origin: Myanmar
- Original language: Burmese
- No. of episodes: 22

Production
- Executive producer: Khin Lay
- Producers: Naing Than; Hein Htet Aye; Nyi Nyi Naing
- Production location: Myanmar
- Cinematography: Alma Dela Peña; Phone Naing
- Editors: Thet Mue Win; Aye Su Su Lwin
- Running time: 40 minutes Mondays to Fridays at 19:00 (MMT)
- Production company: Forever Group

Original release
- Network: MRTV-4
- Release: 15 August – 17 September 2019

Rose (Burmese: နှင်းဆီ, romanized: Hnin Si) is a 2019 Burmese revenge drama television series. It was based on the popular eponymous novel written by Ma Sandar. It aired on MRTV-4, from August 15 to September 17, 2019, on Mondays to Fridays at 19:00 for 22 episodes.

== Cast ==
=== Main ===
- Sithu Win as Tin Maung Kyaw
- Khay Sett Thwin as Hnin
- Kaung Sett Naing as Ko Ko Maung, elder brother of Tin Maung Kyaw
- Ye Aung as U Chan Thar, father of Zaw and Maw
- Shin Mway La as Zaw
- Wai Lar Ri as Maw

=== Supporting ===
- Htet Myat as Aung Myo
- Nay Yee as Ka Note
- Ingyin Htoo as Yin Nan
- Goon Pone Gyi as Kye Kye Ngwe
- Khin Moht Moht Aye as Daw Daw Thet, stepmother of Hnin
