= Ma Ma Htake and Heritage House =

Burmese television series

- Poster
- Burmese: မမထိပ်နှင့်အမွှေစံအိမ်
- Genre: Comedy drama
- Screenplay by: Nyi Aung Nyi; Ma Pan; Aye Moht; Kyaw Yazar Ko
- Directed by: Ko Thaung
- Starring: Khine Thin Kyi; Hein Htet; Mone; Hsu Waddy; Poe Kyar Phyu Khin; May Akari Htoo
- Country of origin: Myanmar
- Original language: Burmese
- No. of episodes: 30

Production
- Executive producer: Khin Lay
- Producers: Naing Than; Kaung Zan; Wyne Shwe Yan Lin
- Production location: Myanmar
- Editors: Aye Su Su Lwin; Hnin Thandar Myo; Yoon Yoon San; May Oo Myint
- Running time: 40 minutes Mondays to Fridays at 19:15 (MMT)
- Production company: Media Kabar

Original release
- Network: MRTV-4
- Release: 17 November – 30 December 2016

Ma Ma Htake and Heritage House (Burmese: မမထိပ်နှင့်အမွှေစံအိမ်) is a 2016 Burmese comedy-drama television series. It aired on MRTV-4, from November 17 to December 30, 2016, on Mondays to Fridays at 19:15 for 30 episodes.

== Synopsis ==
It is about of an over thirty years old virgin woman who taking care of her one nephew and four nieces in the heritage house.

== Cast ==
=== Main cast ===
- Khine Thin Kyi as Ma Ma Htake, Htake Htar
- Hein Htet as Phoe Htoo, Htoo Nay Lin
- Mone as Mi Aye, Htake Khin Khin Aye
- Hsu Waddy as Mi Jue, Jue Kalayar Htake
- Poe Kyar Phyu Khin as Mi Mhway, Htake Khin Khin Mhway
- May Akari Htoo as Mi Zu, Zu Kalyar Htake

=== Supporting ===
- Thet Oo Ko as U Wai, Wai Yan Lin
- Min Thar Ki as Ko Phyo, Wai Phyo Aung
- Shin Mway La as Zeyar Maung
- Thar Htet Nyan Zaw as Nyi Nyi
- Zu Zu Zan as Malar Tint
- Ko Ko Lin Maung as U Htun, U Tin Htun Lwin
- Sai Si Tom Kham as Chit Thu Maung
