= Luyeechon Project =

Myanmar Educational Project

Luyeechon
- Awarded for: Recognizing outstanding performance in academics, general knowledge, verbal skills, and physical fitness among Myanmar pre-high and high school students
- Location: Myanmar
- Established: 1964

The Luyeechon Selection Examination, officially Outstanding Student Selection Examination (Burmese: လူရည်ချွန် ရွေးချယ်ရေး စာမေးပွဲ) is a long-standing educational initiative of Myanmar that has evolved over decades, producing numerous exemplary citizens.

== History ==
The Luyeechon Project (လူရည်ချွန် စီမံကိန်း) commenced in the 1963–1964 academic year, with the first outstanding students emerging in 1964. Initially, selections were made from Grades 7 to 10. In subsequent years, the program expanded to include university and college students. Annual selections continued up to 1988, marking the 25th Silver Jubilee of the Luyeechon Project. After a hiatus starting in 1988, the project was revived in 2013 under the name Multidisciplinary Outstanding Youth Project (ဘက်စုံပညာ ထူးချွန်လူငယ် စီမံကိန်း). In 2014, marking the 50th Golden Jubilee of the project's inception, Luyeechon alumni from across the country formed the "Luyeechon (1964–88) Association". In 2018, the project reverted to its original name, Luyeechon Project. Due to the COVID-19 pandemic, the project was temporarily suspended from the 2019–2020 academic year but resumed in the 2022–2023 academic year. With the new education system, selections have been made from Grades 9 to 12 starting from the 2023–2024 academic year. In the 2024–2025 academic year, the selection process was expanded to include outstanding first-year university students, reflecting the project's commitment to recognizing excellence at higher levels of education.

In the 2024–2025 academic year, although the Luyeechon selection process was successfully held and winners were announced nationwide, the annual excursion for the selected students, which is usually conducted in May, was postponed indefinitely due to the aftermath of a significant earthquake in Myanmar. As of June 2025, no official rescheduled date has been announced.

== Objectives ==
As a national social initiative, the project aims to "enhance multidisciplinary education to cultivate the human resources necessary for building a modern, developed democratic nation". To achieve this goal, continuous efforts are made to nurture future generations in the coming academic years.

== See also ==
- Education in Myanmar
- Ministry of Education
