= Pyar Yay Aine =

Burmese television series

- Burmese: ပျားရည်အိုင်
- Genre: Drama
- Based on: Pyar Yay Aine by Khin Hnin Yu
- Screenplay by: Mal Min Bone; Aye Chan Mon; Aye Pa Pa Min
- Directed by: Hein Soe
- Starring: Aung Yay Chan; May Mi Ko Ko; Myat Thu Thu; Shin Mway La
- Country of origin: Myanmar
- Original language: Burmese
- No. of episodes: 42

Production
- Executive producer: Khin Lay
- Producers: Naing Than; Niyyayana Production
- Production location: Myanmar
- Editors: Su Myat Hlaing; Yoon Yoon San
- Running time: 40 minutes Mondays to Fridays at 20:45 (MMT)
- Production company: Niyyayana Production

Original release
- Network: MRTV-4
- Release: 21 November 2018 – 18 January 2019

Pyar Yay Aine (Burmese: ပျားရည်အိုင်; lit. 'A Puddle of Honey') is a Burmese drama television series. It aired on MRTV-4, from November 21, 2018 to January 18, 2019, on Mondays to Fridays at 20:45 for 42 episodes.

== Cast ==
=== Main ===
- Aung Yay Chan as Ko Tin Phay
- May Mi Ko Ko as Myaing, Nwe Thway Myaing, Mona
- Myat Thu Thu as Mya Nyo
- Shin Mway La as Phay Myaing

=== Supporting ===
- Phone Shein Khant as Ko Lin Maung
- Phyo Yazar Naing as Ko Hla Oo
- Wyne Shwe Yi as Sein
- Han Na Lar as Dr. Irene
- Hein Min Thu as Richart
- May Sue Maung as Shwe Moe Yar
- Kaung Sit Thway as Ko Kyaw Myint
- Zin Wine as Bagyi Mhoon
- May Thinzar Oo as Daw Khin Thandar
- Zaw Oo as U Htun Hla Aung
- Hla Myo Thinzar Nwe as Daw Khin Mar Lar

== Award ==
Year	Award	Category	Nominee	Result
2018	Star Awards	Best TV Series Actress	May Mi Ko Ko	Won
