= Lu Yee Chun =

Burmese television series

- poster
- Burmese: လူရည်ချွန်
- Genre: Drama
- Screenplay by: Myat Phone Mo; Nyi Aung Nyi; Aung Nay Ko Ko; Hein Zaw Oo; Kyaw Yazar Ko
- Directed by: Ko Thaung
- Starring: Myat Thu Kyaw; Kyaw Hsu; May Mi Kyaw Kyaw; Sithu Win; Chue Lay; Su Waddy
- Theme music composer: Shwe Jaw Jaw
- Country of origin: Myanmar
- Original language: Burmese
- No. of episodes: 60

Production
- Executive producer: Khin Lay
- Producers: Naing Than; Aung Pyi Soe; May Thu Wai
- Production location: Myanmar
- Cinematography: Athein
- Editors: Hnin Thandar Myo; Myat Hsu Hsu San
- Running time: 40 minutes Mondays to Fridays at 19:00 (MMT)
- Production company: Forever Group

Original release
- Network: MRTV-4
- Release: 13 April – 6 July 2016

Lu Yee Chun (Burmese: လူရည်ချွန်; lit. 'Outstanding Person') is a 2016 Burmese drama television series. It aired on MRTV-4, from 13 April to 6 July 2016, on Mondays to Fridays at 19:00 for 60 episodes.

== Cast ==
- Myat Thu Kyaw as Zwe Naing
- Kyaw Hsu as Pyone Maung
- May Mi Kyaw Kyaw as See Sar Oo
- Sithu Win as Nanda Kyaw
- Chue Lay as Ngwe Hnin Phyu
- Hsu Waddy as Mya Thidar
- Zu Zu Zan as Hla Lun Swe
- Wyne Swe Yi as Khayay
- Hein Htet as Nay Thway
