= Winkabar Shin Tan =

Burmese television series

- Poster
- Burmese: ဝင်္ကပါရှင်းတမ်း
- Genre: Action-crime; Drama
- Screenplay by: Nyi Aung Nyi; Artist House
- Directed by: Ko Thaung
- Starring: Nat Khat; Sithu Win; Nan Sandar Hla Htun
- Composers: Ko Thaung; Sai Saing Hlaine
- Country of origin: Myanmar
- Original language: Burmese
- No. of episodes: 21

Production
- Executive producer: Khin Lay
- Producers: Naing Than; Hla Phyo
- Production location: Myanmar
- Editors: Yu Yu Lwin; Thazin Moe
- Running time: 40 minutes Mondays to Fridays at 20:45 (MMT)
- Production company: Forever Group

Original release
- Network: MRTV-4
- Release: 19 April – 17 May 2019

Winkabar Shin Tan (Burmese: ဝင်္ကပါရှင်းတမ်း) is a Burmese action-crime television series. It aired on MRTV-4, from April 19, to May 17, 2019, on Mondays to Fridays at 20:45 for 21 episodes.

== Cast ==
- Nat Khat as Sheriff Nay Thurain
- Nan Sandar Hla Htun as Honey
- Sithu Win as Tain Yan Htun
- La Pyae as Zaw Naing
- Shwe Sin Wint Shein as Htet Htet
- Ju Jue Pan Htwar as Aye Aye Khine
- Thar Htet Nyan Zaw as Wanna
- Kyaw Htet as Nay Chi
- Pyay Zin as U Thet Naing Aung
- Khun Nay Chi Cho as Myat Lay Nwe
- Shwe Eain Min as Zin Cho
