= Nat Khat =

Burmese actor and model

- နက္ခတ်
- Born: Soe Moe Naing; October 22, 1990 (age 35); Yangon, Myanmar
- Education: East Yangon University
- Occupations: Actor, model
- Years active: 2012–present
- Parent(s): Nyi Nyi Naing (father); Moe Sabal Myint (mother)

Nat Khat (Burmese: နက္ခတ်; born Soe Moe Naing, 22 October 1990) is a Burmese television actor. He is best known for his role in television series Forever Mandalay (2014), Myittar Athel Mywar (2016), A Yake (2018), Chit Ya Par Thaw Nway (2019) and Kyun Taw A Mone Sone Kyun Taw (2020).

== Early life and education ==
Nat Khat was on October 22, 1990, in Yangon, Myanmar to parents Nyi Nyi Naing and Moe Sabal Myint. He is the second son of three siblings and has two sisters. He graduated from East Yangon University, specialized in Economy.

== Career ==
He started his modelling career from attending at Stars & Models Int'l from 2011 to 2012. He started his acting career from selecting for the new cast by Forever Group. In 2013, he starred in drama series Forever Mandalay alongside Aung Min Khant, Chue Lay, Aung Yay Chan and Myat Thu Thu, aired on MRTV-4, on February 10, 2014. In the same year, he starred in comedy-drama series Flowers & Butterflies alongside Kyi Zaw Htet, Soe Nandar Kyaw, Khay Sett Thwin, Kyaw Hsu and Kyaw Htet.

In 2016, he starred in a drama series Myittar Athel Mywar. In the same year, he starred in drama series Better Tomorrow alongside Aung Min Khant, Aung Yay Chan and Chue Lay. In 2018, he starred in drama series A Yake as the character Kyaw Htun Nyo alongside May Myint Mo, Hein Htet, Khay Sett Thwin and Nan Sandar Hla Htun. In 2019, he starred in action-drama series Winkabar Shin Tan alongside Si Thu Win and Nan Sandar Hla Htun. The same year, he starred in drama series Chit Ya Par Thaw Nway as the character Paing Thu alongside Chue Lay.

In 2020, he starred in a tragedy drama series Kyun Taw A Mone Sone Kyun Taw and gain increased attention and popularity with his role as the character Soe Naing alongside Nan Sandar Hla Htun and Nay Yee Win Lae.

== Filmography ==
=== Television series ===
- Flowers & Butterflies (2013)
- Forever Mandalay (ထာဝရမန္တလေး) (2014)
- Myittar Athel Mywar (မေတ္တာအသည်းမြွာ) (2016)
- Better Tomorrow (ပို၍လှသောမနက်ဖြန်) (2016)
- A Yake (အရိပ်) (2018)
- Winkabar Shin Tan (ဝင်္ကပါရှင်းတမ်း) (2019)
- Chit Ya Par Thaw Nway (ချစ်ရပါသောနွေ) (2019)
- Kyun Taw A Mone Sone Kyun Taw (ကျွန်တော်အမုန်းဆုံးကျွန်တော်) (2020)
- Ma Kyay Si (မကြေးစည်) (2022)
- Kar Yan Lwae Myittar (ကာရန်လွဲမေတ္တာ) (2023)
- Kyin Phaw (ကြင်ဖော်) (2025)
- Mha Ta Par A Char Ma Shi Pee (မှတစ်ပါး အခြားမရှိပြီ) (2026)
