= Tatiya Myaut Sone Mat =

Burmese television series

- Burmese: တတိယမြောက်ဆုံမှတ်
- Genre: Action
- Screenplay by: Aye Moht Moht Aung; Aye Pa Pa Min; Kyaw Yazar Ko
- Directed by: Kiattipong Roungpratoom
- Starring: Hein Htet; Myat Thu Thu; Shin Mway La; May Mi Ko Ko
- Composers: Lynn Lynn; Chan Hein Kywel; Nay War
- Country of origin: Myanmar
- Original language: Burmese
- No. of episodes: 37

Production
- Executive producers: Brian L.Marcar; Khin Lay
- Producers: Naing Than; Nyi Nyi Naing
- Production location: Myanmar
- Editors: Yoon Yoon San; Paing Soe Thu; Zin Min Htut
- Running time: 40 minutes Mondays to Fridays at 20:45 (MMT)
- Production company: Forever Bec-Tero

Original release
- Network: MRTV-4
- Release: 30 August – 21 October 2019

Tatiya Myaut Sone Mat (Burmese: တတိယမြောက်ဆုံမှတ်) is a 2019 Burmese action television series. It aired on MRTV-4, from August 30 to October 21, 2019, on Mondays to Fridays at 20:45 for 37 episodes.

== Cast ==
=== Main ===
- Hein Htet as Say Ta Man
- Myat Thu Thu as Yoon May Kha
- Shin Mway La as Swan Yi
- May Mi Ko Ko as Ngwe Pan Chi

=== Supporting ===
- Min Oo as U Nay Mahar
- Nay Myo Aung as U Oak Soe Khant
- Nyi Nanda as U Myo Myint Htin
- Pwint Nadi Maung as Daw Nu May
- Mya Hnin Yee Lwin as Daw Zar Chi Thin
- Saw Min Yar as Lin Bo
- Jar Seng Eain as Nay Yi Yi
- Ingyin Htoo as Lu Lu
