= Nan Sandar Hla Htun =

Myanmar actress and model (born 1993)

- နန်းစန္ဒာလှထွန်း
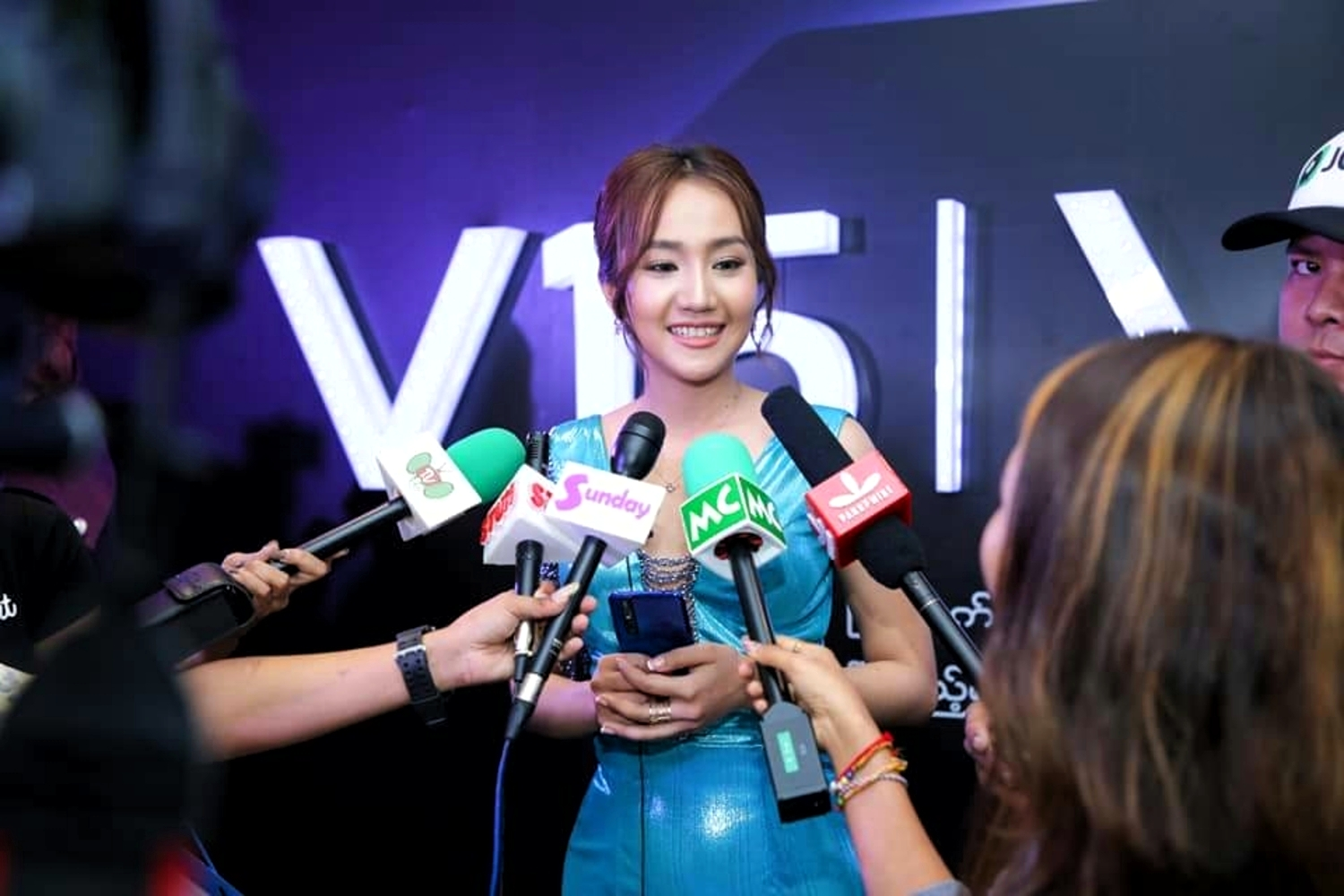
- Nan Sandar Hla Htun in 2019 at Vivo event.
- Born: Nan Sandar Hla Htun; 22 June 1993 (age 33); Möng Pawn, Shan State, Myanmar
- Education: Taunggyi University
- Occupations: Actress, model, former beauty queen
- Years active: 2012–present
- Height: 165 cm (5 ft 5 in)

Nan Sandar Hla Htun (နန်းစန္ဒာလှထွန်း; also spelt Nan Sandar Hla Tun; born 22 June 1993) is a Myanmar actress, model and former beauty queen. She gained widespread popularity after starring in the MRTV-4 series Magical Village (2017), A Yake (2018) and The Seven Banknotes (2019).

== Early life and education ==
Nan Sandar Hla Htun was born on 22 June 1993 in Möng Pawn, Shan State to ethnic Shan-Danu parents. But she grew up in Taunggyi. She is the eldest child among three siblings, having two younger sister. She attended high school at Basic Education High School No. 3 Taunggyi and graduated from Taunggyi University with a degree in English.

== Career ==
She began her modeling career in 2012. She competed in local pageant contests and won many contests and hold continental titles are Miss Dr. Secret Southern Shan State 2012, Miss Lipice 2013, Miss Wanlima 2013, and 1st Runner up of the Miss Now How 2014. In 2014, she was selected the Academy Ban Kine, the person tasked with holding the tray of the Academy statue at the Myanmar Academy Awards Ceremony. After that, she competed in Miss World Myanmar 2015 and became the 1st Runner up after the competition.

She made her acting debut in 2015 with the film Romeo's Shin Mway Loon alongside A Linn Yaung, Thinzar Nwe Win and Nan Nan. She then starred in her second film Change alongside Aung Ye Lin and Thinzar Nwe Win. In 2016, she took on her first big-screen role in the film Kyun Ma A Chit Sone York Kyar 3 York, directed by Mg Myo Min. End of 2016, she was chosen by Forever Group for MRTV-4 series and she got opportunity for acting in many series.

In 2017, she starred in her first TV series Magical Village where she played the main role with Aung Min Khant, Thuriya, Kyaw Thu and Chue Lay, aired on MRTV-4 on 14 September 2017. Her portrayal of the character Yay Wadi earned praised by fans for her acting performance and character interpretation, and experienced a resurgence of popularity. In 2018, reprised her role as Thet Thet in the hit drama A Yake (Shadow) alongside Hein Htet, Nat Khat, Yan Aung, May Myint Mo and Soe Myat Thuzar, aired on MRTV-4 on 2 May 2018. This was a huge success and becoming the most watched Burmese television drama at that time. The series is adapted from Ma Sandar's popular novel A Yake. The same year, she starred in drama Closest to the Heart alongside Kaung Myat San, Swan Htet Nyi Nyi, Thiha and May Akari Htoo aired on MRTV-4 in 2018.

In 2019, she starred in crime-action series Winkabar Shin Tan and received critical acclaim. She gain increased attention and popularity again with her role as Thara Phi in the thriller series The Seven Banknotes alongside Hein Htet, Thiha and Mya Hnin Yee Lwin aired on 18 July 2019. In 2020, she starred in the romantic drama Kyun Taw A Mone Sone Kyun Taw where she played the main role as Aye Phyu with Nat Khat and Nay Yee Win Lae. The series is based on Leltwin Thar Saw Chit's popular novel of the same name.

== Filmography ==
=== Film (Cinema) ===
- The Three Men, She Loves (2019)

=== Film ===
- Romeo's Shin Mway Loon (2015)
- Change (2015)
- Htee Kalay Yae A Yake (ထီးကလေးရဲ့ အရိပ်) (2026)

=== Television series ===
- Magical Village (ပဉ္စလက်ရွာ) (2017)
- A Yake (အရိပ်) (2018)
- Closest to the Heart (နှလုံးသားနှင့်အနီးဆုံး) (2018)
- Winkabar Shin Tan (၀င်္ကပါ ရှင်းတမ်း) (2019)
- The Seven Banknotes (ငွေစက္ကူ၇ရွက်) (2019)
- Kyun Taw A Mone Sone Kyun Taw (ကျွန်တော်အမုန်းဆုံး ကျွန်တော်) (2020)
- Tharaphu (သရဖူ) (2022)
- Daung Yin Pyan Bon Nabay Mhar Sar Yay Loh Htar Chin Dal (ဒေါင်းယာဉ်ပျံဘုံနံဘေးမှာစာရေးလို့ထားချင်တယ်) (2022)
- Beyond The Hate (အမုန်းရဲ့အလွန်) (2026)
