= Mya Hnin Yee Lwin =

Burmese actress and model (born 1987)

- မြနှင်းရည်လွင်
- Born: 12 January 1987 (age 39); Rangoon, Burma
- Education: Dagon University
- Occupations: Actress, model, revolutionary
- Years active: 2010–present
- Spouse: Myo Thwin (m. 2014; div. 2020)

Mya Hnin Yee Lwin (Burmese: မြနှင်းရည်လွင်; also spelled Mya Hnin Yi Lwin, born 12 January 1987) is a former Burmese actress, model, and current revolutionary. She has become popular among the audience with the film Angel of Eden which brought her wider recognition.

In the aftermath of the 2021 Myanmar coup d'état, she retired from her acting career and became a vocal critic of Myanmar's ruling military junta. Her active involvement in anti-coup protests resulted in an arrest warrant being issued against her, leading her to flee to the jungle. There, she joined the People's Defence Force and became a revolutionary.

== Early life and education ==
Mya Hnin Yee Lwin was born on 12 January 1987 in Yangon, Myanmar She is the youngest child among four siblings. She attended high school at Basic Education High School No. 2 Kamayut and graduated from Dagon University with a degree in Psychology.

== Career ==
Mya Hnin Yee Lwin entered the entertainment industry in 2010, and appeared in Sai Sai Kham Leng's MTV "Ever Golli". She then appeared on billboards for commercial advertisement in 2011. In 2012, she was selected the Academy Ban Kine, the person tasked with holding the tray of the Academy trophy at the Myanmar Academy Awards Ceremony. After that, she worked as a photo model but faded from the limelight in 2014.

She made her acting debut with the film Eden's Angel in 2016. She was cast in her first television series, Nway Kanar Oo alongside Si Thu Win and Htun Eaindra Bo, aired on MRTV-4 in 2017. She then starred in her second series, Kyamar Noon alongside Min Oo, Yan Kyaw, Phoe Thaut Kyar, May Thinzar Oo, Hsu Hlaing Hnin, and Soe Nandar Kyaw, which aired on MRTV in 2018. Then she had to play in several series: Zanee Chaw Myar Konyet, Toxic, Wingaba Shin Tan and Tatiya Myauk Sone Mak in 2018.

She gained increased popularity again with her role as Wai Hnin Phyu in the hit drama Ngwe Satku 7 Yawt, which aired on MRTV-4 in 2019.

== Political activities ==
Following the 2021 Myanmar coup d'état, Mya Hnin Yee Lwin was active in the anti-coup movement both in person at rallies and through social media. Denouncing the military coup, she has taken part in protests since February. She joined the "We Want Justice" three-finger salute movement. The movement was launched on social media, and many celebrities have joined the movement.

On 6 April 2021, warrants for her arrest were issued under section 505 (a) of the Myanmar Penal Code by the State Administration Council for speaking out against the military coup. Along with several other celebrities, she was charged with calling for participation in the Civil Disobedience Movement (CDM) and damaging the state's ability to govern, with supporting the Committee Representing Pyidaungsu Hluttaw, and with generally inciting the people to disturb the peace and stability of the nation.

Some have noted her resemblance to the national leader Aung San Suu Kyi. A photographer once asked her to model for a photoshoot dressed like Aung San Suu Kyi. During a protest, she encouraged women to wear national costumes and adorn their hair with flowers, similar to Aung San Suu Kyi. She has fled from Yangon and sought refuge in a rebel-controlled "liberated" area, where she has vowed to continue her fight against the junta. She later joined the armed resistance.

In December 2023, she promoted a campaign called "Project Life Saving", which helped purchase military equipment supplied to anti-junta forces in the Sittaung River basin in the eastern part of Bago.

== Selected filmography ==
=== Film ===
- Angel of Eden (အေဒင်ရဲ့နတ်သမီး) (2016)
- Yee Sar Ta Won Kwal (ရည်းစားတဝမ်းကွဲ) (2018)
- The Masks (မျက်နှာဖုံးများ) (TBA)
- Miles Away Under The Moon (လရဲ့အောက်ဖတ်မိုင်အဝေးမှာ) (TBA)
- Promise (ကတိ) (TBA)

=== Television series ===
Year	English title	Myanmar title	Network	Notes
2018	Nway Kandar Oo	နွေကန္တာဦး	MRTV-4	
2018	Kyamar Noon	ကြမ္မာနွံ့	MRTV	
2018	Beautiful Wives Club	ဇနီးချောများကွန်ရက်	MRTV	
2018	Toxic	အဆိပ်သွေး	Canal+	
2018	Winkabar Shin Tan	၀င်္ကပါရှင်းတမ်း	MRTV-4	
2018	Tatiya Myaut Sone Mat	တတိယမြောက်ဆုံမှတ်	MRTV-4	
2019	Toxic: Season 2	အဆိပ်သွေး ၂	MRTV-4	
2019	The Seven Banknotes	ငွေစက္ကူ၇ရွက်	MRTV-4	
2019	Room No. ?	အခန်းနံပါတ်?	MRTV-4	
2019	Myint Mo What Tae Pote-ser	မြင့်မိုရ်ဝှက်တဲ့ပုစ္ဆာ	Canal+	
2019	Late Pyar Hnaung Kyo	လိပ်ပြာနှောင်ကြိုး	MRTV-4	Supporting role
2020	Mar Yar Hlae Kwat	မာယာလှည့်ကွက်	MRTV-4	

== Personal life ==
Mya Hnin Yee Lwin married to Myo Thwin in December 2014 and divorced in 2020.
