= Aung Yay Chan =

Burmese actor

- အောင်ရေချမ်း
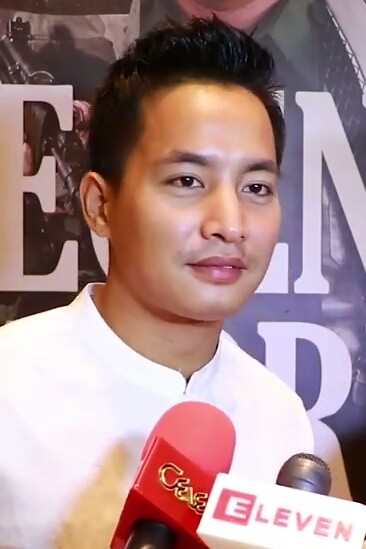
- Born: July 7, 1991 (age 35); Yangon, Myanmar
- Education: University of Distance Education, Yangon
- Occupations: Actor, model
- Years active: 2010–present
- Height: 5 ft 9 in (1.75 m)

Aung Yay Chan (Burmese: အောင်ရေချမ်း; born 7 July 1991) is a Burmese television and film actor. He is best known for his roles in television series Pyar Yay Aine (2018), I'm Mahaythi (2019), Sue Pann Khwai Thwe Bayet Hnint Pay Ywat Leik Nahtaung Sin (2020), Legends of Warriors (2020), Mahuyar Pearl (2023) and Blue Sea and Blue Sky (2023).

== Early life and education ==
He was born in Yangon, Myanmar on 7 July 1991 and his parents were originally from Thandwe. He is youngest brother of three. He attended high school at BEHS 1 Insein.

== Career ==
In 2010, the first step in the role of Aung Yay Chan was to play a role in the Roleplaying. After that, he participated in a photogenic competition organized by Forever Group. While competing in the competition, MRTV-4 Talent was selected for the new cast.

In 2012, he starred in his first MRTV-4 drama series Forever Mandalay alongside Aung Min Khant, Chue Lay and Myat Thu Thu.

In 2015, he starred in thriller drama series Winkabar San Eain alongside Aung Min Khant, Poe Kyar Phyu Khin, Hsaung Wutyee May and Myat Thu Thu. In the same year, he starred in thriller drama series Sone See Chin Moe Tain Myar.

In 2016, he starred in drama series Better Tomorrow alongside Aung Min Khant, Nat Khat and Chue Lay.

In 2017, he then took the leading role in drama series Pyar Yay Aine as the character Ko Tin Phay alongside May Mi Ko Ko and Myat Thu Thu.

In 2018, he starred in drama series Yatha Mawkun Alinkar. In the same year, he starred the main role Min Myo Nwe, in drama series I'm Mahaythi alongside Wint Yamone Naing and Than Thar Moe Theint.

In 2019, he starred in drama series Sue Pann Khwai Thwe Bayet Hnint Pay Ywat Leik Nahtaung Sin as the character Myo Thwin alongside Khant Sithu and Khine Thin Kyi. In the same year, he starred in military series Legends of Warriors alongside Kyaw Hsu and May Myint Mo.

From 2020 to 2022, he starred in drama series Mahuyar Pearl as the character Thet Oo Maung alongside May Mi Ko Ko.

In 2022, he starred in drama series Lightless Night and Brightest Day as the character Khwin alongside Min Taw Win and Nan Su Oo.

In 2023, he starred in drama series Blue Sea and Blue Sky as the character Nyein Oo alongside May Mi Ko Ko and Ingyin Htoo. In the same year, he starred in drama series Nint as the character Nyi Lin Nyo alongside Min Oo and Khin Wint Wah.

== Relationships ==
He married Khine Mar Win on 27 January 2024, at White Swan Restaurant in Yangon.

== Filmography ==
=== Film (Cinema) ===
- Yoma Paw Kya Tae Myet Yay (ရိုးမပေါ်ကျတဲ့မျက်ရည်) (2019)
- 8 Seconds Silence (2020)

=== Film ===
- Mhone (မှုံ) (2014)
- A Phyu Yaung Thet Tant (အဖြူရောင်သက်တန့်) (2014)

=== Television series ===
- Forever Mandalay (ထာဝရမန္တလေး) (2014)
- Winkabar San Eain (ဝင်္ကပါစံအိမ်) (2015)
- Better Tomorrow (ပို၍လှသောမနက်ဖြန်) (2016)
- Sone See Chin Moe Tain Myar (ဆုံစည်းခြင်းမိုးတိမ်များ) (2017)
- Pyar Yay Aine (ပျားရည်အိုင်) (2018)
- Yatha Mawkun Alinkar (ရသမော်ကွန်းအလင်္ကာ) (2018)
- I'm Mahaythi (ကျွန်မကမဟေသီ) (2019)
- Sue Pann Khwai Thwe Bayet Hnint Pay Ywat Leik Nahtaung Sin (ဆူးပန်းခွေသွယ်ဘယက်နှင့်ပေရွက်လိပ်နားတောင်းဆင်) (2020)
- Legends of Warriors (တစစ်တမက်ကိုယ်နှင့်သက်ကို) (2020)
- Mahuyar Pearl (မဟူရာပုလဲ) (2023)
- Lightless Night and Brightest Day (အလင်းမဲ့ည အတောက်ပဆုံးနေ့) (2023)
- Blue Sky and Blue Sea (ပင်လယ်ပြာပြာ မိုးပြာပြာ) (2023)
- Nint (နင့်) (2023)
- Yin Phwint Pya Chin Thi (ရင်ဖွင့်ပြချင်သည်) (2024)
- Atta Sue (အတ္တဆူး) (2025)
- The Loom (လွန်း) (2025)
