= Chue Lay =

Burmese actress

- ခြူးလေး
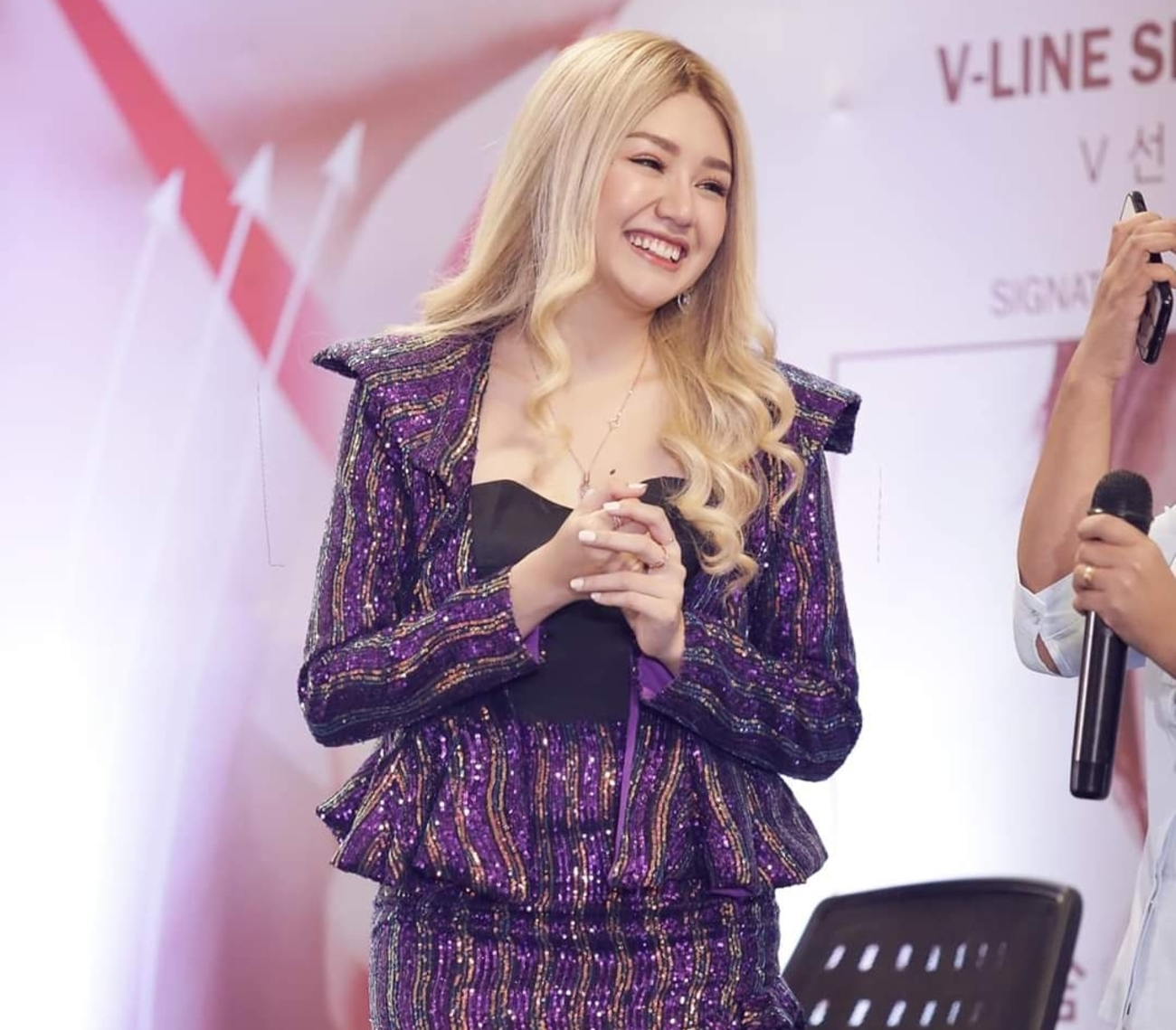
- Chue Lay in 2020
- Born: San Thaw Tar; October 5, 1993 (age 32); Thandwe, Rakhine State, Myanmar
- Education: University of West Yangon
- Occupation: Actress
- Years active: 2012–present
- Known for: Ngwe Yi Hnin Sat in Forever Mandalay; Cho Myain in Sign of Moe Pan Pwint; San Win Maw in Bodaw King
- Height: 5 ft 4 in (1.63 m)
- Awards: Myanmar Academy Award (Best supporting actress for 2024)
- Website: www.chuelay.com

Chue Lay (Burmese: ခြူးလေး; born San Thaw Tar; 5 October 1993), formerly known as Nay Inzara (နေအဥ္ဇရာ) is a Burmese television and film actress of ethnic Rakhine descent who gained popularity after starring in the several MRTV-4 series. In 2025, she received the Myanmar Academy Award for Best Supporting Actress for her role as San Win Maw in the 2024 film Bodaw King.

== Early life and education ==
Chue Lay was born on 5 October 1993 in Thandwe, Rakhine State, Myanmar. She is the eldest child among two siblings, having a younger brother. She attended high school at Basic Education High School No. 4 Insein. She graduated from University of West Yangon with a degree in English.

== Career ==
In 2012, she entered the acting industry as a contestant in the talent competition "Pyaw Shwin Sayar Tha Yoke Saung Kabar" (Happy Acting World). Following the competition, she signed a five-year contract with MRTV-4 as an actress. She made her on-screen debut in the film Kyal Taeyar Tike Pwe (Star War), appearing alongside fellow students from an acting training class. She later starred in In Tin Tin Gwin and Twist.

In 2014, she starred in her debut series Forever Mandalay, playing a lead role alongside Aung Min Khant, Han Lin Thant, Aung Yay Chan, and May Me Kyaw Kyaw. The series aired on MRTV-4 in February 2014 and became a major success in Myanmar television. She then appeared in her second drama, Pan Nu Thway Season 2, which aired on MRTV-4 later that year. Her portrayal of the character Chue Lay received positive reviews and brought her wider recognition. Following this, she adopted Chue Lay as her stage name.

She portrayed the female lead in her debut 2018 big-screen film Sign of Moe Pan Pwint, alongside Han Lin Thant and May Myint Mo. The role earned her a nomination for the 2018 Myanmar Academy Award for Best Supporting Actress.

She went on to appear in several television series throughout the 2010s. Her credits include Lu Yee Chun (Sophisticated Person) in 2015; Po Ywae Hla Thaw Ma Net Phyan (Prettier Tomorrow) and Kan Kan Ei A Kyo in 2016; Yatha Mawkun Alinkar, Shwe Phoo Sar Sone Yar Myay (The Land of Real Love), and Happy Beach: Season 2 in 2018; and Chit Ya Par Thaw Nway (Lovely Chit Nway) and Nway Lel Nya Ye La Min (The Moon in a Midsummer Night) in 2019. She also played in some films like Kyaw Kyar A Mhwe Sein Wi Nyin and Bar Nyar Bar Nyar in 2019, Thaung Tike Ka Kyar Say Thar (May the Universe Hear It) in 2020. Now she is preparing for her next series Tharaphu (The Crown), a famous novel by Khin Hnin Yu.

She starred in a military propaganda short film Those Who Will Gallop Through History (ခေတ်သမိုင်းကို ဒုန်းစိုင်းမည့်သူများ), produced by the junta and released on October 25, 2025. The film depicts events from the 2021 military coup to the planned general election, portraying the Civil Disobedience Movement (CDM), youth emigration, and armed resistance groups in a critical light. Following its release, she faced public criticism over her involvement in the film. State media reported that legal action would be taken against individuals who publicly criticized the production.

== Filmography ==
=== Film ===
- Kyal Taeyar Tike Pwe (ကြယ်တာရာတိုက်ပွဲ) (2012)
- In Tin Tin Gwin (အင်တင်တင်ဂွင်) (2013)
- Twist (2013)
- Kout Kyaung Myinn Pyaing (ကောက်ကြောင်းမျဉ်းပြိုင်) (2014)

=== Film (Cinema) ===
Year	Film	Burmese title	Note
2018	Sign of Moe Pan Pwint	မိုးပန်းပွင့်ရဲ့သင်္ကေတ	
2019	Kyaw Kyar A Mhwe Sein Wi Nyan'	ကျော်ကြားအမွှေစိန် ဝိညာဉ်	
2019	Bar Nyar Bar Nyar	ဘာညာဘာညာ	
2020	Thaung Tike Ka Kyar Say Thar	သောင်းတိုက်ကကြားစေသား	
2022	Kyaw Gyi Ka Chit Tat Tal	ကျော်ကြီးကချစ်တတ်တယ်	
2026	Yite Pauk	ရိုက်ပေါက်	

=== Television series ===
Year	English title	Myanmar title	Network	Notes
2014	Forever Mandalay	ထာဝရမန္တလေး	MRTV-4	
2014	Happy Beach: Season 2		MRTV-4	
2015	Pan Nu Thway: Season 2	ပန်းနုသွေး အတွဲ၂	MRTV-4	
2016	Lu Yee Chun	လူရည်ချွှန်	MRTV-4	
2016	Po Ywae Hla Thaw Ma Net Phyan	ပို၍လှသောမနက်ဖြန်	MRTV-4	
2016	Kan Kan Ei A Kyo	ကံ ကံ၏အကျိူး	MRTV-4	
2017	Magical Village	ပဉ္စလက်ရွာ	MRTV-4	
2018	Yatha Mawkun Alinkar	ရသ ေမာ်ကွန်း အလင်္ကာ	MRTV-4	
2018	Shwe Phoo Sar Sone Yar Myay	ရွှေဖူးစာဆုံရာမြေ	MRTV-4	
2019	Chit Ya Par Thaw Nway	ချစ်ရပါသောနွေ	MRTV-4	
2019	Nway Lal Nya Yae La Min	နွေလယ်ညရဲ့လမင်း	MRTV-4	
2022	Tharaphu	သရဖူ	MRTV-4	

== Awards, nominations and recognition ==
On March 2, 2026, she was conferred the Medal for Excellent Performance in Social Field (First Class), one of the highest national medals awarded by the Government of Myanmar for exceptional contributions to social welfare.

=== Academy Awards ===
Year	Award	Category	Nominated work	Result
2018	Myanmar Academy Award	Best Supporting Actress	Sign of Moe Pan Pwint	Nominated
2024	Myanmar Academy Award	Best Supporting Actress	Bodaw King	Won
