= Htoo Aung =

Burmese actor, model, and fitness trainer

- ထူးအောင်
- Born: May 22, 1993 (age 33); Yangon, Myanmar
- Occupations: Model, Actor, Gym Owner
- Years active: 2016-present

Htoo Aung (born 22 May 1993) is a Burmese model, actor and gym owner. He is known for appearing in several Burmese comedy films, including Zut Kyar (2017), My Rowdy Angel (2018), Lu Pyo Htaung (2025), and his exceptional performance in Burmese television series, including Bagan Myo Thu (2018), The Missing Truth (2019) and Ma Joe Ko Bal Lo Pyaw Ya Pa (2026).

== Early life and education ==
Htoo Aung was born on 22 May 1991 in Yangon, Myanmar. He attended primary and secondary education in Yangon before studying Civil Engineering at a Government Technical College (G.T.C.) Thanlyin.

== Career ==
Htoo Aung began his career as a model before entering the entertainment industry as an actor. His involvement in fitness and bodybuilding contributed to his public profile and led to opportunities in music videos, films, and television dramas.

He gained recognition through appearances in films such as Yoma Paw Kya Tae Myet Yay, Zut Kyar, LadyBoy and When the War Is Over. He has also appeared in television series including Bagan Myo Thu, The Missing Truth and A Kyin Nar Myit Phyar. In 2026, Htoo Aung received increased popularity for starring in a drama television series Ma Joe Ko Bal Lo Pyaw Ya Pa and was praised by audiences for his outstanding performance as the character Ko Tar.

== Fitness career ==
In addition to acting, Htoo Aung is involved in the fitness industry and has worked as a fitness trainer. He appeared as a host on Fittest On Earth (FOE), a reality fitness training competition show aired on MRTV-4.

== Filmography ==
=== Film ===
- Zut Kyar (2017)
- My Rowdy Angel (ကိုယ်စောင့်နတ်) (2018)
- LadyBoy (လေဒီဘွိုင်း) (2019)
- Yoma Paw Kya Tae Myet Yay (ရိုးမပေါ်ကျတဲ့မျက်ရည်) (2019)
- When the War Is Over
- Poisonous Kiss (အဆိပ်သင့်အနမ်း) (2022)
- Lu Pyo Htaung (လူပျိုထောင်း) (2025)
- Super Lady (စူပါလေဒီ) (2025)
- Yoke Shi Yay Shan (ရုပ်ရှိရေလျှံ) (2026)

=== Television ===
- Bagan Myo Thu (ပုဂံမြို့သူ) (2018)
- The Missing Truth (ပျောက်ဆုံးနေသောအမှန်တရား) (2019)
- A Kyin Nar Myit Phyar (အကြင်နာမြစ်ဖျား) (2019)
- Pa War Par Par Tha Nap Khar (ပဝါပါးပါးသနပ်ခါး) (2024)
- Ma Joe Ko Bal Lo Pyaw Ya Pa (မဂျိုးကိုဘယ်လိုပြောရပါ့) (2026)

=== Programs ===
- Fittest On Earth - FOE (2023)
- The Famous Farming Show: Season 2, 3 (ဆယ်လီစိုက်ပျိုးရေး) (2025-2026)
