= Aung Lay =

Burmese actor and model

- အောင်လေး
- Born: San Tun Aung; 26 January 1992 (age 34); Yangon, Myanmar
- Occupations: Actor, model
- Years active: 2010–present

Aung Lay (Burmese: အောင်လေး; born San Tun Aung on 26 January 1992) is a Burmese actor and model. He began his career as a model and had his breakthrough in films Yar Zawin Yine Khae The (2018), Ta Khu Lat (2018) and Wind Up Dancer (2019).

== Early life ==
Aung Lay was born on 26 January 1992 in Hlaingthaya Township, Yangon, Myanmar. He is the youngest child among three siblings.

== Career ==
In 2009, he joined John Lwin's model training. Since then, he took professional training in modelling and catwalk. He began his entertainment career as a runway model as part of the John Lwin's Star and Model Agency with countless advertising shows and runways that had been walked on. He also attended the Sarkawar acting training class. He has appeared in several music videos and gained popularity after acting in Yair Yint Aung's "Ya Par Tal Htwat Thwar Par" and Wa Na's "A Nee Sone Lu". His hardwork as a model and acting in music videos was noticed by the film industry and soon, movie casting offers came rolling in.

He made his acting debut with a main role in film York Kyar Ma Sit Lar Ma Chit Nae, alongside Moe Aung Yin, Han Lin Thant and Nawarat. He has since appeared in 11 films. He made his big-screen debut with Yar Zawin Yine Khae The where he played the lead role with Zay Ye Htet, which screened in Myanmar cinemas on 6 July 2018 and received critical acclaim and positive reviews for his portrayal of the gay character. In the same year, he played the main role in drama film Ta Khu Latt, alongside Tyron Bejay, Lin Aung Khit, Lin Zarni Zaw, Khin Zarchi Kyaw and Myo Thandar Tun, which screened in Myanmar cinemas on 2 November 2018.

In 2019, he co-starred with Daung, Alice Ong and Angel Lamung in the dance film Wind Up Dancer, directed by Myo Myint Shwe, and written by Nat Khat Ni. It was produced by JATAKA Film Production and screened in Myanmar cinemas on 9 May 2019. He then starred in action film Beware, It's Dangerous alongside Myint Myat, Yone Lay, Tyron Bejay and Khin Wint Wah, which screened in Myanmar cinemas on 20 June 2019. In the same year, he starred in drama Eain Mat Thway Moe Htar Tae Aein alongside Win Morisaki, Cham Min Ye Htut, Oak Soe Khant, Nay Chi Oo and Myo Sandy Kyaw aired on MNTV on 24 February 2020.

== Filmography ==
=== Film ===
Over 10 films, including

- York Kyar Ma Sit Lar Ma Chit Nae (ယောက်ျားမစစ် လာမချစ်နဲ့)

=== Film (Cinema) ===
Year	English title	Burmese title	Notes
2018	Yar Zawin Yine Khae The	ရာဇဝင်ရိုင်းခဲ့သည်	Lead role
2018	Ta Khu Lat	တစ်ခုလပ်	Main role
2019	Wind Up Dancer	လေဆန်ကကြိုး	Main role
2019	Beware, It's Dangerous	သတိ အန္တရာယ်ရှိသည်	Main role
TBA	Lu Htae Ka Lu	လူထဲကလူ	Main role
TBA	Mafia City		Main role
TBA	Bad Boys 2	လူဆိုးလေးများ ၂	Main role

=== Television series ===
Year	English title	Myanmar title	Network	Notes
2020	Eain Mat Thway Moe Htar Tae Aein	အိမ်မက်တွေ မိုးထားတဲ့အိမ်	MNTV	
TBA	Poe Kaung Lay Myar	ပိုးကောင်လေးများ	-	
TBA	Sate Kann	စိတ်ကန်း	-	
