= Naw Phaw Eh Htar =

Burmese actress and model

- နော်ဖောအယ်ထား
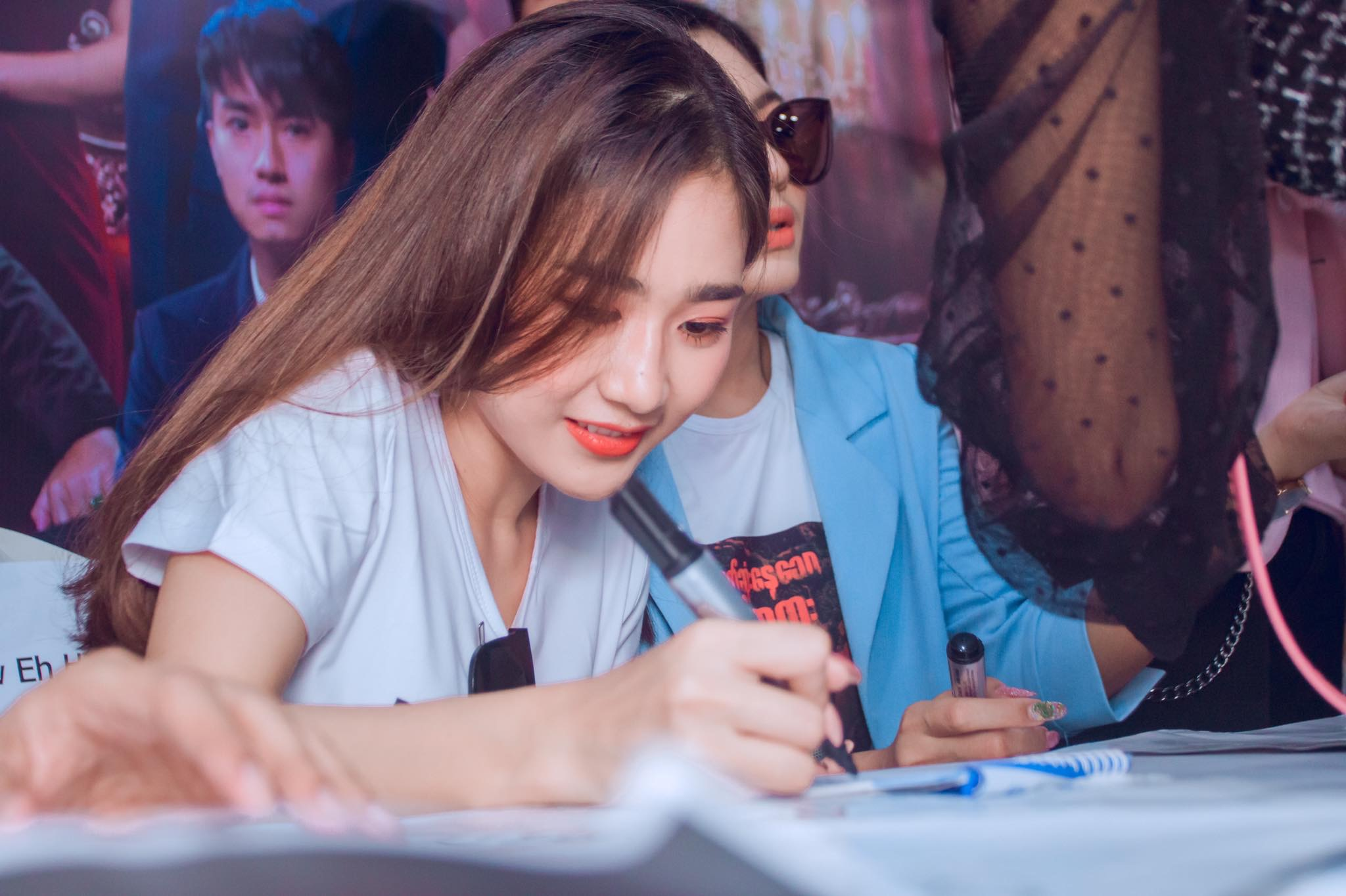
- Naw Phaw Eh Htar at the 2019 signing event of The Missing Truth series
- Born: Naw Phaw Eh Htar; January 19, 1996 (age 30); Taunggyi, Shan State, Myanmar
- Other name: Putu
- Education: Mandalay University of Foreign Languages; SHRM College
- Occupations: Actress, Model
- Years active: 2018–present
- Notable work: Thudra in The Missing Truth; Phoo Phoo in Crying Forest
- Height: 5 ft 5 in (1.65 m)
- Parents: Khun Tin Lynn (father); Naw Hsar Po (mother)

Naw Phaw Eh Htar (S'gaw Karen: နီၢ်ဖီအဲၣ်ထါ, Burmese: နော်ဖောအယ်ထား; born 19 January 1996) is a Burmese actress and model. She gained popularity after starring in the 2019 thriller drama series The Missing Truth which brought her wider recognition.

== Early life and education ==
Naw Phaw Eh Htar was born on 19 January 1996 in Taunggyi, Shan State, Myanmar, to parents Khun Tin Lynn and Naw Hsar Pho, who are of ethnic Pa'O and Karen descent. She is the middle child among three siblings, having an older brother and a younger sister. She finished her primary and higher education in Taunggyi. She went on to attend Mandalay University of Foreign Languages. She graduated with a B.A. (French language) from MUFL in 2018 and also earned the Diploma in Business Management from SHRM College in Singapore in 2019.

== Career ==
She was crowned campus beauty queen during her freshman year at the university. Since then, she has seized every opportunity that came her way, nurturing her dream of pursuing a career in the entertainment industry. Following her graduation, she participated in numerous music video productions, photo shoots, and wedding fairs. Additionally, she acted in an educational web series targeted at youth. She was chosen as the brand model for SAI Cosmetix by Sai Sai Kham Leng. Her dedication to modeling and acting in commercials caught the attention of the film industry, leading to a stream of casting offers.

She made her acting debut in the MRTV-4 series The Missing Truth, alongside Kaung Myat San, Htoo Aung, Aung Ye Htike, and May Myint Mo. The series aired on MRTV-4 in 2019. Her portrayal of the character Thudra garnered praise from fans for her acting performance and character interpretation, experiencing a resurgence of popularity. The same year, she starred in the documentary series Mythical Myanmar Bagan, alongside May Toe Khine. The documentary explores the exotic ancient city of Myanmar, Bagan, delving into its culture, heritage, and beauty.

In 2019, she was cast in the horror film Ma Phae Wah, a collaborative project with Thailand and directed by Pakphum Wonjinda, based on the story of Ma Phae Wah.

She ventured into the big screen with her debut role in the 2023 film Deli Taxi Love, sharing the screen with Hlwan Paing and Shin Mway La.

== Brand Ambassadorships ==
In 2019, she was appointed as brand ambassador for Telenor Myanmar, Sunkist and Free Fire in Myanmar. In 2021, she became the brand ambassador for vivo smartphones in Myanmar, a role she continues to hold to the present day. In 2024, she was also appointed as the brand ambassador for REMAX smartphone accessories in Myanmar, a position she continues to hold.

== Political activities ==
Following the 2021 Myanmar coup d'état, Naw Phaw Eh Htar was active in the anti-coup movement both in person at rallies and through social media. Denouncing the military coup, she has taken part in protests since February. She joined the "We Want Justice" three-finger salute movement. The movement was launched on social media, and many celebrities joined the movement.

On 4 April 2021, warrants for her arrest were issued under Section 505(a) of the penal code by the State Administration Council for speaking out against the military coup. Along with several other celebrities, she was charged with calling for participation in the Civil Disobedience Movement (CDM) and damaging the state's ability to govern, with supporting the Committee Representing Pyidaungsu Hluttaw, and with generally inciting the people to disturb the peace and stability of the nation.

On 29 June 2021, the state-owned MRTV News reported that charges against a total of 24 artists, including Naw Phaw and others, had been dropped.

== Personal life ==
Naw Phaw Eh Htar has been involved in charitable activities and community initiatives alongside her acting career. Through her work in film and television, she developed a connection with the Merry Chapman School for the Deaf, where she has continued to support the school and its students. She has also learned sign language as part of her ongoing engagement with the deaf community.

She has also supported the Myanmar Agape Orphanage, particularly during the beginning of the school year, by providing school bags, stationery and other educational supplies for children.

Naw Phaw Eh Htar has also participated in charitable activities supporting women and children. On occasions such as International Women's Day and Mother's Day, she has visited Yangon Women's Hospital to participate in charitable initiatives and offer support to patients and families.

Alongside her charitable activities, she has maintained an active acting career, regularly appearing in television series and feature films.

== Filmography ==
=== Film (Cinema) ===
Year	Title	Director	Co-Stars	Role
2023	Deli Taxi Love	Pyi Hein Thiha	Hlwan Paing, Shin Mway La	Moe Thae
2023	Master Chelf Gyi	Pyi Nyein Thiha	Myint Myat , Yoon Yoon	
2024	Sein Pauk Pauk	Ko Zaw ( Ar Yone Oo )	Myint Myat , Than Thar Moe Theint , Htet Htet Htun , Khine Hnin Wai , May Pache	
2024	Shel Aww Lan	Ko Zaw ( Ar Yone Oo )	Tyron , Nay Win , Chue Lay , Soe Myat Thuzar , Khin Hlaing	
2024	Naung	Aww Ratha	Nay Toe , Poe Mamhe Thar	Thit Thit May
2025	Zaw Ga Ni	Ko Zaw ( Ar Yone Oo )	Myint Myat , May Myint Mo , May Than Nu	
2025	Sayar Sayar Gyi	Ko Zaw ( Ar Yone Oo )	Tyron , Htoo Aung , Chue Lay , Soe Myat Thuzar , Kyaw Ye Aung	
2025	Aung Si Aung Maung	Khin Hlaing	Nay Toe , Phyo Wai Soe , Tyron , Phyo Lay , Nay Chi Shoon Lak , Khin Hlaing	
2025	Lu Pyo Htaung	Ko Zaw ( Ar Yone Oo )	Htoo Aung , Melody , Yu Thandar Tin	
2025	Pride	Kyaw Zaw Lin	Khine Hnin Wai , Wyne Su Khine Thein , Aye Myat Thu , Wai Lar Ri , Yamoan Myint Myat	
2025	Eain Met Tway Zay Gyi Tal	Pwint Theingi Zaw	Paing Takhon , Soe Myat Thuzar , Thun Sett , May Pache	
2025	Pwe	Ko Zaw ( Ar Yone Oo )	Myint Myat , Kyaw Kyaw Bo , Yamoan Myint Myat , Nyi Htut Khaung	
2025	York Kyar Tway Ma Kaung Bue	Ko Zaw ( Ar Yone Oo )	Nay Toe , Chaw Kalayar , Moe Pyae Pyae Maung	
2025	Forever My Girlfriend	Mae Min Bon	Aye Chan Mg	Yar Thet Pan
2026	New Aww Lan	Ko Zaw ( Ar Yone Oo )	Tyron , Nay Win , Chue Lay , Soe Myat Thuzar	
2026	Nat Pan	Ko Zaw ( Ar Yone Oo )	Myint Myat , Khant Kyaw , Nay Myo Aung , Soe Myat Thuzar	
2026	Good Boy	Ko Zaw ( Ar Yone Oo )	Myint Myat , Shwe Htoo , Yadanar Bo , Yamin May Oo	
2026	Taw Joker	Ko Zaw ( Ar Yone Oo )	Myint Myat , Melody , May Pache	
2026	Shwe Pin Oh	Steel	A Lin Yaung , Htet Htet Moe Oo , Moe Hay Ko , Nyi Htut Khaung	
2026	A Mway	Aww Ratha	Nay Toe , Nay Aung , Zin Aung , War So Moe Oo , Yamin May Oo , Soe Moe Kyi	Mary
TBA	Ma Phae Wah	Pakphum Wonjinda	Khar Ra, Kohtee Aramboy, Naraphat Stary, Patricia	Khin Thandar

=== Television series ===
Year	English title	Myanmar title	Role	Network	Cast
2018	Mythical Myanmar Bagan	"ဒဏ္ဍာရီမြန်မာ" ပုဂံသို့	herself	Iflix	documentary
2019	The Missing Truth	ပျောက်ဆုံးနေသောအမှန်တရား	Thudra	MRTV-4	Lu Min , Htoo Aung , Kaung Myat San , Aung Ye Htike , May Myint Mo , Thun Thitsar Zaw
2022	Yin Htae Dan Dar Yee	ရင်ထဲကဒဏ္ဍာရီ	Wadi	Channel K	Hlwam Paing
2022	Crying Forest	အိပ်မက်ငိုတော	Phoo Phoo	Canal+ Zatlenn	Aung Min Khant , Shein Tin Htoo , Shinn Myat , Yadanar Bo
2023	Izzatta Mee Eain (lit. Lamp of Inner Mind)	အဇ္ဈတ္တမီးအိမ်	Shin Thant	Fortune TV	Kyaw Ye Aung , Thu Ri Ya , Nyein Thaw , Tayza Lin Yaung , Htun Palal Yadanar
2023	Mingalar Shi Tae Eain Ka Lay	မင်္ဂလာရှိတဲ့အိမ်က‌လေး		Mahar TV	Aung Ye Htike , Phone Thiri Kyaw
2023	My Husband's Secret	ကျွန်မခင်ပွန်း၏လျှို့ဝှက်ချက်		Htv	Cham Min Ye Htut , Nay Shine
2023	Sait Kyoe Say Yar	စိတ်ကြိုးစေရာ			Shein Tin Htoo
2023	Mhu Thar Pyint Si Yin Up Thaw	မုသားဖြင့်စီရင်အပ်သော		Mahar TV	Nyein Thaw , Tun Ko Ko , Kyaw Ye Aung , Chaw Kalayar
2023	My Dear	သို့...ချစ်ရပါသော		Channel K (TV channel)	Nyein Thaw , Tun Ko Ko , Six Min Htet
2024	Aung Myin Kyaw Kyar Lin Let Tauk Pa	အောင်မြင်ကျော်ကြား လင်းလက်တောက်ပ		Hey Play	Myint Myat
2024	A Virgue Dream	မသဲကွဲသောအိပ်မက်		Canal+ (Myanmar)	Aung Ye Lin , Nan Su Oo
2024	Thu Nge Chin Mi Htwe	သူငယ်ချင်းမိထွေး		M Channel Myanmar	Tyron , Nay Htut , Ye Aung , War So Moe Oo
2025	Kyin Phaw	ကြင်ဖော်	Chaw Kalyar	MRTV-4	Soe Pyae Thazin , Wai Lar Ri , Nat Khat , Nay Htut , Nay Lynn Shane , May Pache
2026	Yay Set Toh The Lal Ta Khar Ta Yan Ma Sone Si Thar	ရေစက်တို့သည်လည်း တစ်ခါတစ်ရံမဆုံဆည်းသာ		Hey Play & MRTV-4	Nay Toe , Aye Myat Thu

Awards & Nominations
