= Myanmar Diaries =

2022 Burmese-Dutch-Norwegian documentary

- Burmese: မြန်မာဒိုင်ယာရီ
- Directed by: Myanmar Film Collective
- Written by: Myanmar Film Collective
- Produced by: Corinne van Egeraat; Petr Lom
- Production company: ZIN Documentaire
- Distributed by: Autlook Filmsales; Icarus Films
- Release dates: February 13, 2022 (Berlin Film Festival); May 12, 2022 (Netherlands)
- Running time: 70 minutes
- Countries: Myanmar; Netherlands; Norway
- Language: Burmese

Myanmar Diaries (Burmese: မြန်မာဒိုင်ယာရီ), is a 2022 Burmese-Dutch-Norwegian collage film documenting the aftermath of the 2021 Myanmar coup d'état, which led to nationwide protests, a brutal crackdown, and the ongoing civil war,

== Summary ==
The film is a series of short films, some of which feature fictional stories or reenactments of true events, directed by the Myanmar Film Collective, an anonymous group of ten young Burmese filmmakers.

== Production ==
Myanmar Diaries was shot by various anonymous filmmakers in the aftermath of the Myanmar coup d'état that occurred on 1 February 2021.

Myanmar Diaries was first screened in the "Panorama" section of the 72nd Berlin International Film Festival on 13 February 2022.

== Critical reception ==
The film was well received by audiences and won the Berlinale Documentary Award, Bronze Panorama Audience Award, and Amnesty Film Award at the 72nd Berlin International Film Festival. It was also shown at other film festivals, including the 27th Busan International Film Festival. The film was shortlisted as one of three submissions made by the Netherlands to compete for Best Documentary Film at the 95th Academy Awards. Myanmar Diaries was awarded the inaugural Tony Elliott Impact Award at the annual Human Rights Watch Film Festival.

Phuong Le, writing for The Guardian in the United Kingdom, gave the film four out of five stars, praising it as a "powerful" and "gut-punching" testament to the violence of the military coup. Lee Marshall of Screen Daily also expressed enthusiasm for the film, albeit with reservations for the fictional segments, stating that it "lacks a unifying narrative and is something of an uneven assortment.... But taken as a whole, Myanmar Diaries is both an urgent denunciation of human rights abuses and a thought-provoking work of art".

== Accolades ==
Award	Ceremony date	Category	Recipient(s)	Result
Berlin International Film Festival	20 February 2022	Berlinale Documentary Award	The Myanmar Film Collective	Won
Berlin International Film Festival	20 February 2022	Amnesty International Film Award	Myanmar Diaries	Won
Human Rights Watch Film Festival	10 February 2022	Tony Elliott Impact Award	Myanmar Diaries	Won
Biografilm Festival	2022	Audience Award International Competition	Myanmar Diaries	Won

== See also ==
- Broken Dreams: Stories from the Myanmar Coup, a 2023 Burmese anthology film considered as a follow-up to Myanmar Diaries
- Burma VJ, a 2007 Danish documentary film about the Saffron Revolution
- Rays of Hope, a 2023 autobiographical documentary by director Ko Pauk about his life during the Myanmar civil war
- Losing Ground (2023 film), a short documentary film about the situation of young people in Yangon during the civil war
