= Angel Lamung =

Burmese actress, model, and beauty queen

- အိန်ဂျယ်လမုန်
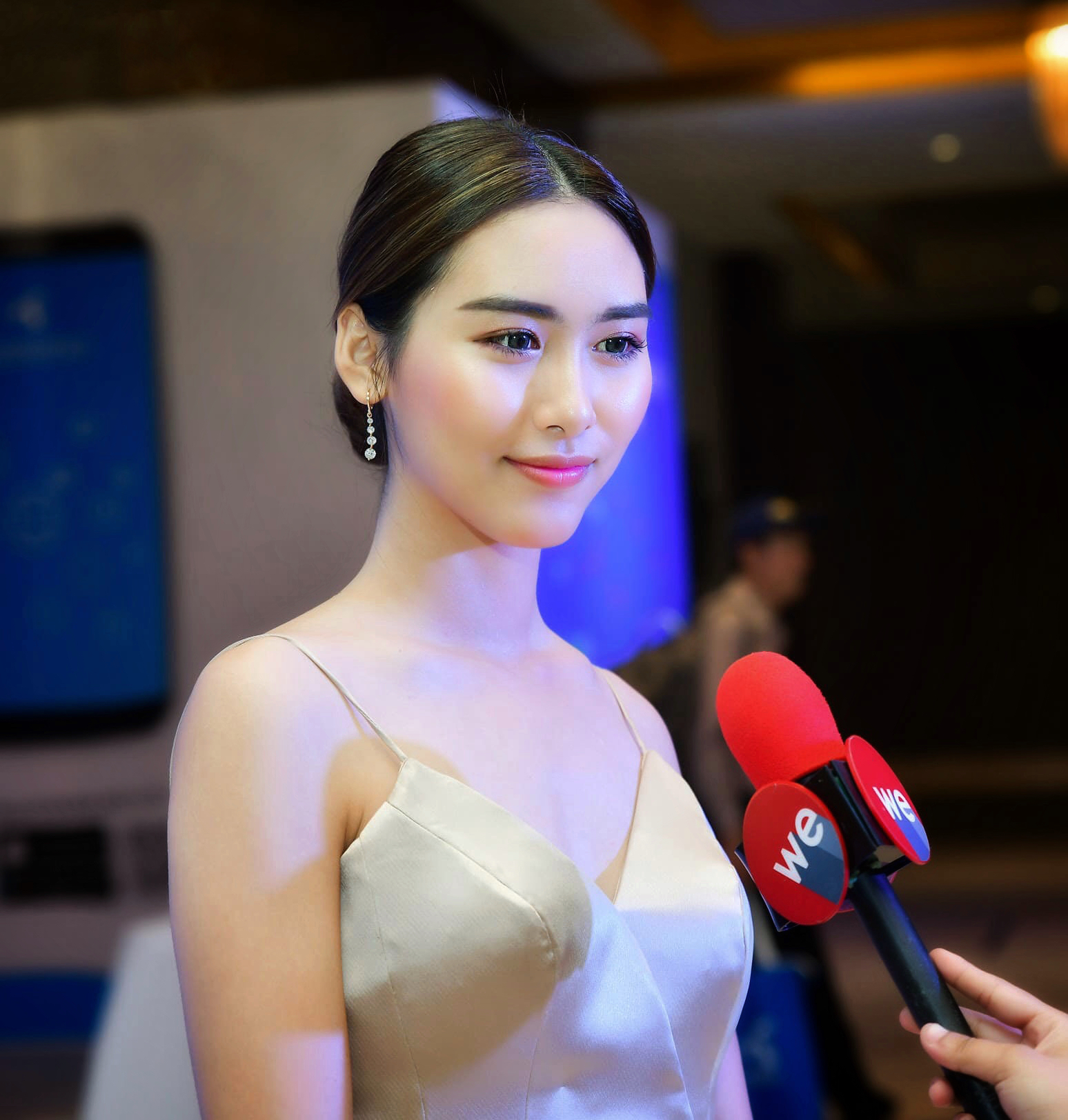
- Angel Lamung at one of the events in Yangon
- Born: Lamung Jaseng Tsawm; 25 June 1997 (age 29); Mandalay, Myanmar
- Education: Yadanabon University
- Occupations: Actress, Model, Beauty queen
- Height: 1.73 m (5 ft 8 in)
- Beauty pageant titleholder
- Title: Miss Intercontinental Myanmar 2014
- Years active: 2014–present
- Hair color: Black
- Eye color: Black
- Major competitions: Miss Intercontinental Myanmar 2014 (Winner); Miss Intercontinental 2014 (Top 16)

Angel Lamung (Burmese: အိန်ဂျယ်လမုန်; born Lamung Jaseng Tsawm on 25 June 1997) is a Burmese actress, model and beauty pageant title holder of ethnic Kachin descent. She was crowned the Miss Intercontinental Myanmar 2014 and represented Myanmar at the Miss Intercontinental 2014.

== Early life and education ==
Angel Lamung was born on 25 June 1997 in Mandalay, Myanmar. She is an ethnic Kachin descent. She is the youngest daughter of two siblings, having an older brother. She is a practicing Baptist. She attended high school at Myint Myat Pyinnyar private high school. She studies English majoring in the distance education of Yadanabon University.

== Pageantry ==
=== Local pageant ===
In 2014, she competed in the High School Queen Oramin-F 2014, a pageant for brand and placed as the 1st runner-up.

=== Miss Golden Land Myanmar 2014 ===
After competing in the High School Queen Oramin-F 2014, she joined the second edition of Miss Golden Land Myanmar which was held on 21 August 2014 at Myanmar Convention Center, Yangon, Myanmar. At the end of the event, she was crowned Miss Intercontinental Myanmar 2014.

=== Miss Intercontinental 2014 ===
She represented Myanmar at the Miss Intercontinental 2014 pageant which was held on 4 December 2014 in Magdeburg, Germany, along with beauties from 80 other nations. She was placed in the top 16.

== Career ==
=== 2015–2017: Modeling ===
After previously competing in the Miss Intercontinental 2014 pageant, a person who recognized her from Miss Intercontinental Myanmar, and got many requests to act the advertisements. Angel started working modeling and appeared on magazine cover photos and as commercial model for many advertisements.

=== 2017–present: Acting debut and career ===
Angel began her acting career in 2017. She made her acting debut with a leading role in the romantic drama film Unstoppable alongside Khar Ra, directed by Arga. In 2018, she starred in her second film Thaman Kyar (Weretiger), alongside Paing Takhon, directed by Dattha Kyaw Swar. In the same year, she portrayed the female lead in Thai-Burmese action film Sleeping Awake, alongside Naing Naing and Aye Myat Thu, directed by Arkar together Thai director Sammy. In the same year, she co-starred with Daung, Aung Lay and Alice Ong in the dance film Wind Up Dancer, directed by Myo Myint Shwe, and written by Nat Khat Ni. It was produced by JATAKA Film Production and premiered in Myanmar cinemas on 9 May 2019.

In 2019, she starred in the drama Longing with Love where she played the leading role with Daung and Paing Phyo Thu, aired on Kamayut Media Facebook page in March 2019. In 2020, she starred in the drama film Longing with Love, remake of the series of the same name and directed by Nathan Maung, premiered in Myanmar cinemas on 13 February 2020.

== Political activities ==
Following the 2021 Myanmar coup d'état, Angel was active in the anti-coup movement both in person at rallies and through social media. Denouncing the military coup, she has taken part in protests since February. She joined the "We Want Justice" three-finger salute movement. The movement was launched on social media, and many celebrities have joined the movement. On 3 April 2021, warrants for her arrest were issued under section 505 (a) of the penal code by the State Administration Council for speaking out against the military coup. Along with several other celebrities, she was charged with calling for participation in the Civil Disobedience Movement (CDM) and damaging the state's ability to govern, with supporting the Committee Representing Pyidaungsu Hluttaw, and with generally inciting the people to disturb the peace and stability of the nation.

== Filmography ==
=== Film ===
- Unstoppable (တားဆီးမရနိုင်သော) (2017)
- Thaman Kyar (Weretiger) (သမန်းကျား) (2018)

=== Film (Cinema) ===
- Wind Up Dancer (လေဆန်ကကြိုး) (2019)
- Longing with Love (အချစ်ဖြင့်လွမ်းစေ) (2020)
- Sleeping Awake (နှလုံးသားအိမ်မက်) (TBA)

=== Television series ===
- Longing with Love (အချစ်ဖြင့်လွမ်းစေ) (2019)
