= Ko Pauk =

Burmese film director and screenwriter (born 1975)

- ကိုပေါက်
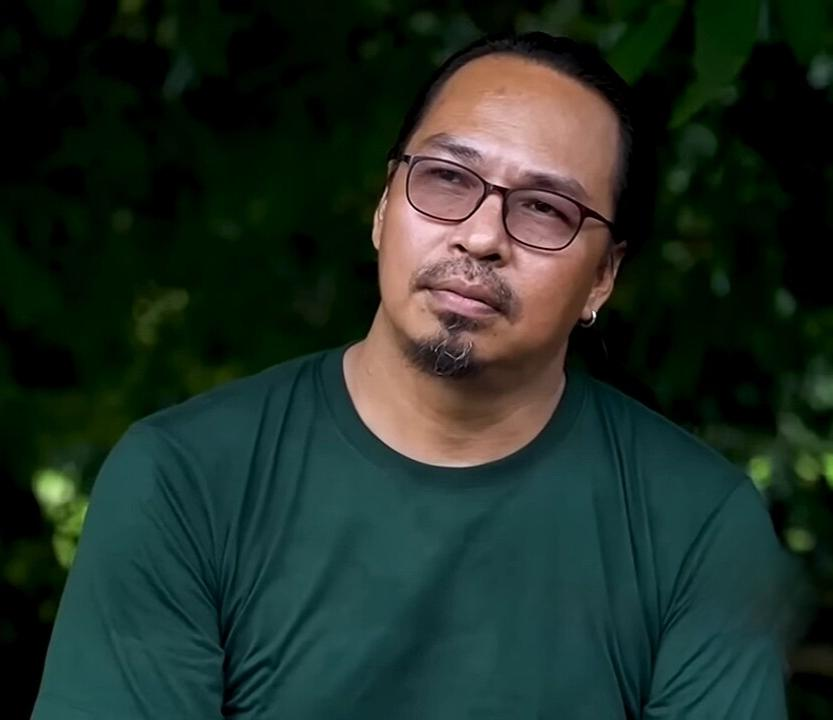
- Ko Pauk during an interview with VOA Burmese in August 2024
- Born: 1972 (age 53–54)
- Citizenship: Myanmar (revoked by State Administration Council in 2022)
- Education: University of Yangon
- Occupations: Film director, screenwriter, activist and actor
- Years active: 1998–present
- Known for: Film director; participant in the Civil Disobedience Movement (CDM) following the 2021 Myanmar coup d'etat
- Criminal charges: Section 505(a) (incitement against the military)
- Criminal penalty: Arrest warrant issued; property confiscated (2022)
- Criminal status: At-large

Ko Pauk (Burmese: ကိုပေါက်) in 1975) is a Burmese film director, screenwriter, activist and a former actor. He first started out as an actor and has played in over 400 movies and films. He has directed over 200 videos and 20 feature films. He is also known for his anti-junta movements after the 2021 Myanmar coup d'etat and for leaving his film career to join the resistance forces.

== Early life and education ==
Pauk was born in 1972. He first started out as an actor and screenwriter, before becoming a film director showcasing the documentaries and film-making for the People's Defence Forces, in which he became active since the 2021 Myanmar coup d'etat.

== Actor and directing career ==
Pauk started out his career as artist, film maker and director and has taken part in 400 movies and films. He also has directed over 200 films and 20 feature films.

Before the 2021 Myanmar coup d'etat unfolded, he was a respected figure in the Myanmar film making industry known for his storytelling talent and creativity. His filmography includes Baw Baw Ka Htaw (2018), Yoma Paw Kya Tae Myet Yay (2019), LadyBoy (2019), and The Dependant (2021).

=== Post-coup career ===
He became prominent in joining the Civil Disobedience Movement after the 2021 Myanmar coup d'etat, in which he took to the role of a resistance anti-coup director and film maker, notable for his role in The Roads Not Taken (Burmese: မသောက်မိသောမိုးခါးရေး), a 30 minutes documentary film released in 2022. This film is based on a true story about a Myanmar Army captain who defected and joined the people's side and the CDM. The film was set to be shown in fifteen countries in five languages.

In February 2021, the military issued an arrest warrant for Pauk among other celebrities. Pauk and six other individuals were wanted under section 505a of the Penal Code, which makes it a crime to demotivate government employees. Pauk was accused of participating in and encouraging the Burmese population to join a growing general strike aimed at resisting the dictatorship, and using his platform to encourage civil servants to join the Civil Disobedience Movement (CDM) against the military coup. He went into hiding as a result.

Rays of Hope (ရောင်နီလာရာလမ်း), an 1 hour and 45 minutes autobiographical documentary released in Japan in 2023, documents Ko Pauk's own life as an artist and director who became a revolutionary during the ongoing Myanmar civil war. He fled to the jungle after 2021 Myanmar coup d'etat, and since then he has been active in the resistance movement. In an interview with Myanmar Now, he stated, "I made this film to show the rightness and humanity of a soldier's decision to stand on the side of the people."

He had no cameraman or crew when he was directing and filming these documentaries. He had not only shot, edited, but also even added background music with that phone. Some of his friends helped with the final editing and subtitles. It was filmed entirely on an iPhone 11 Pro Max. He stated "I am the cameraman, I am the scriptwriter, I am the director, I am the set designer." He had to collect the uniforms of the military junta soldiers who had been killed or captured during the fighting.

In 2025, he criticised the military propaganda film "Those Who Will Change the History of the Era" (ခေတ်သမိုင်းကို ဒုန်းစိုင်းမည့်သူများ) directed by Nay Toe among others. He stated "Their decision, their choice, their path. We also believe in the revolution together with the people, the people's suffering, our own suffering, the people's pain, our own pain. Whether the fans who supported us were happy or not, the fans' suffering that supported us, just like our own suffering, we stood on this side."

== Personal life ==
Pauk has been a vocal advocate for the LGBT community in which he directed his film LadyBoy (2019), it is not described as a "gay film", but as a film about human experiences. Pauk is described as a "family-oriented man who values the bonds of love and unity within his home".

On 21 February 2022, Ko Pauk's home in North Dagon Township was sealed off at the same time that authorities confiscated the apartment of activist Min Ko Naing.

== Filmography ==
- Rays of Hope (2023)
- The Roads Not Taken (2022)
- The Dependant (2021)
- Yoma Paw Kya Tae Myet Yay (2019)
- LadyBoy (2019)
- Baw Baw Ka Htaw (2018)
- Saii Kyait Dae Maung (2017)
