= Wind Up Dancer =

2019 Burmese romantic-drama film

- Film Poster
- Burmese: လေဆန်ကြိုး
- Directed by: Myo Myint Swe
- Screenplay by: Nat Khat Ni
- Produced by: Win Aung
- Starring: Daung; Yan Aung; Zin Wine; Aung Lay; Leo; Angel Lamung; Alice Ong
- Cinematography: Myo Myint Swe
- Production company: Jataka Film Production
- Release date: May 9, 2019 (Myanmar)
- Running time: 120 minutes
- Country: Myanmar
- Language: Burmese

Wind Up Dancer (Burmese: လေဆန်ကြိုး) is a 2019 Burmese romantic-drama film, directed by Myo Myint Swe starring Daung, Yan Aung, Zin Wine, Aung Lay, Leo, Angel Lamung and Alice Ong. The film, produced by Jataka Film Production premiered in Myanmar on May 9, 2019.

== Cast ==
- Daung as Thurain
- Angel Lamung as Thet Tant May
- Aung Lay as Sue
- Alice Ong as Cinthia
- Leo as Leo
- Yan Aung
- Zin Wine
