= Ma Joe Ko Bal Lo Pyaw Ya Pa =

Burmese television series

- Poster
- Burmese: မဂျိုးကိုဘယ်လိုပြောရပါ့
- Genre: Drama
- Based on: Ma Joe Ko Bal Lo Pyaw Ya Pa by Khin Hlaing Kyu
- Screenplay by: Shwe Pyae
- Directed by: Win Htun Htun
- Starring: Thazin Nwe Win; Htoo Aung; Nyi Htut Khaung
- Opening theme: "Maung Ayine Pann" by Phyo Kyaw Htike
- Ending theme: "Maung Ayine Pann" by Phyo Kyaw Htike
- Composer: Sai Kham Thi
- Country of origin: Myanmar
- Original language: Burmese

Production
- Executive producer: Tin Maung Win
- Producer: Khaing Wah
- Cinematography: 4C; Hla Cho (Apple)
- Editor: May Thet Naing Htun
- Running time: 40 minutes Mondays to Fridays at 19:00 (MMT)
- Production companies: Shwe Nadi Shwe Yi Film Production; HD Post Production

Original release
- Network: MRTV-4
- Release: August 10 – August 31, 2026

Ma Joe Ko Bal Lo Pyaw Ya Pa (Burmese: မဂျိုးကိုဘယ်လိုပြောရပါ့) is a 2026 Burmese drama television series directed by Win Htun Htun starring Thazin Nwe Win, Htoo Aung and Nyi Htut Khaung, and produced by Shwe Nadi Shwe Yi Film Production. It is based on a novel with the same name written by Khin Hlaing Kyu. It aired on MRTV-4, from August 10 to August 31, 2026, on Mondays to Fridays at 19:00 for 16 episodes.

== Synopsis ==
Can a person's humanity, empathy, morals, and responsibility be judged by their outward appearance? The series portrays the idea that only when one can control and direct their rationality and desires can one truly be a human being.

== Cast ==
- Thazin Nwe Win as Ma Joe
- Htoo Aung as Ko Tar
- Nyi Htut Khaung as Ko Kyaw, Kyaw Zaw Aung
- Hmue Htake Htar as Pann Ni Ni Cho
- Zin Myo as U Htein Win
- Ye Mon as U Naing Win
- Win Myaing as U Aung Thit
- Thinzar Win Pyae as Daw Khin Wai
- Win Min Than as Daw Tin Tin Oo
- Swan Htet Lin (child cast) as Lin Yone. His nickname is Chu Lay.
