= Rays of Hope =

- Burmese: ရောင်နီလာရာလမ်း
- Directed by: Ko Pauk
- Written by: Ko Pauk
- Production company: Thaw Wunn Kyar Phyu Production
- Release date: February 4, 2023 (Japan)
- Running time: 105 minutes
- Country: Myanmar
- Language: Burmese

Rays of Hope (Burmese: ရောင်နီလာရာလမ်း) is a 2023 Burmese autobiographical documentary film directed by Ko Pauk which documents his life as an artist-turned-revolutionary during the Myanmar civil war.

The film was screened in Japan on 4 February 2023.

== Production ==
Ko Pauk, a filmmaker, illustrator and musician, produced Rays of Hope after making his short documentary film titled The Road Not Taken. Pauk's intention for the film is to raise funds for the Myanmar Spring Revolution.

== Release ==
Rays of Hope was screened in a theater in Tokyo, Japan on 4 February 2023, with a reporter from NHK praising it as a "priceless film that should be recorded and preserved in world history." On 18 February, the film was screened in the United States in the city of Indianapolis, Indiana at a theater along Madison Avenue, with National Unity Government (NUG) Deputy Prime Minister Moe Zaw Oo and Foreign Minister Zin Mar Aung in attendance. It was later screened in Perth, Australia on 11 March at the Canning Town Hall.

== See also ==
- Myanmar Diaries, a 2022 Burmese collage film about the aftermath of the 2021 Myanmar coup d'état
- Broken Dreams: Stories from the Myanmar Coup, a 2023 Burmese anthology film
- Losing Ground, a 2023 Burmese short documentary film about young people in Yangon after the 2021 coup
