= Eternal Gosh! =

Pop rock band from Myanmar

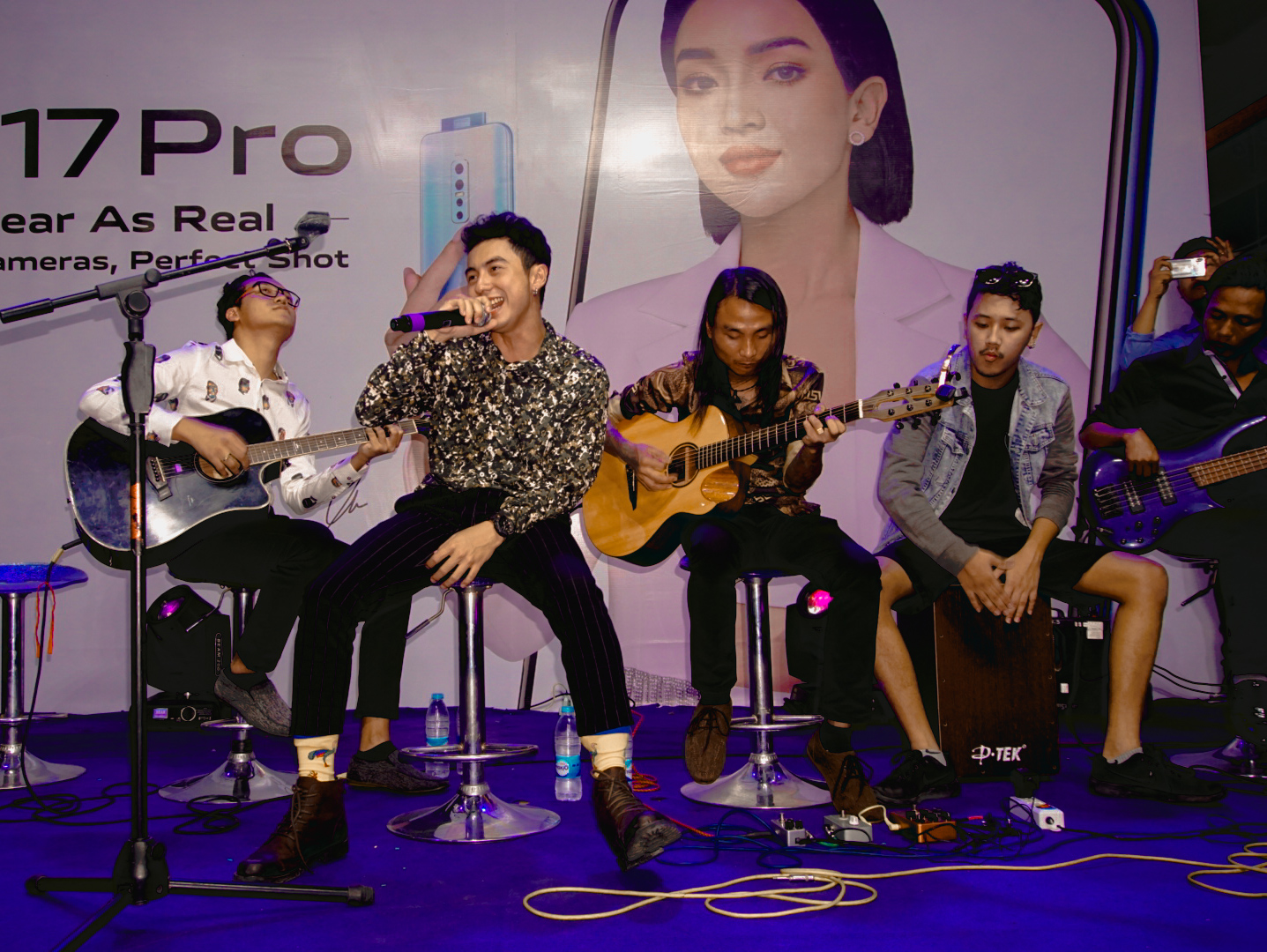
- Eternal Gosh! performing Vivo Promotion Show at Mandalay (2019); from left to right: Yee Mon Oo, Han Nay Tar, Wai Gyi, Ar Ray and Bon Bon

Background information
- Also known as: EG
- Origin: Yangon, Myanmar
- Genres: pop rock; alternative rock; modern rock; alternative metal
- Years active: 2013–present
- Labels: Legacy Music Network i-Entertain Company; Bo Bo Entertainment
- Members: Han Nay Tar; Wai Gyi; Yee Mon Oo; Ar Ray; Bon Bon
- Past members: Moe Wai

Eternal Gosh! (often abbreviated as EG) is a Burmese pop rock band, founded in 2013. The band consists of five members, lead vocalist and songwriter Han Nay Tar, lead guitarists Wai Gyi and Yee Mon Oo, bassist Bon Bon and drummer Ar Ray. Their music spans a wide range of genres, from pop rock, to alternative rock, to alternative metal.

The band attracted interest from major music labels and publishers. They were managed by i-Entertain Company and Demo Thaw, co-founder and vice-president at i-Entertain. The band's first EP, Your Surprise Is Our Heartbeats (Y.S.I.O.H) was released in 2017. Their debut full-length album, The Red Sky (Kaung Kin A Ni), was released on 5 October 2017 under Bo Bo Entertainment. The band's albums were released by Legacy Music Network. On 31 August, Eternal Gosh! performed at the FG LIVE LOUNGE Concert at Yay Kuu Amplified Broadcast Station.

== History ==
=== Background and origins ===
The name Eternal Gosh!, according to founding member Han Nay Tar, came from a book. Eternal Gosh! was initially formed on 23 May 2013 by Han Nay Tar, Wai Gyi and Ar Ray. Han Nay Tar and Wai Gyi are originally from Magway. They came to Yangon to make music and met Ar Ray at a guitar class. Later Yee Mon Oo was invited to fill in as their guitarist and was the last to join the band.

=== Music history ===
The band's debut EP, Your Surprise Is Our Heartbeats (Y.S.I.O.H.), was released in 2017, independently through online distribution. Their first studio album, The Red Sky (Kaung Kin A Ni), was released on 5 October 2017. After releasing The Red Sky, the song Moe Ma Kha Eain Mat Kha Yan Pyar was the longest charting No 1 on the Myanmar Top Chart on JOOX. On 30 November 2018, Eternal Gosh! performed at 369 Dine and Bar, ibis Style Yangon Stadium Hotel with Idiots Band.

On 15 March 2019, the official music video of Moe Ma Kha Eain Mat Kayan Pyar was released. The band also released their second official music video of Sea Ghost on 1 June 2019. They released the soundtrack of the TV series Seven Cash in collaboration with Taurus V Production on 1 July 2019. On 24 March, Eternal Gosh! performed at the Myanmar Yout Shi Concert at the Hard Rock Cafe in Myanmar Plaza with Idiots Band in Yangon. They also performed at the FG Live Lounge at Yay Kuu Amplified Broadcast Center together with Idiots Band on 31 August. On 25 October, the band performed at the MYANFEST festival organized by Myanmar Beer with other famous singers at Thuwanabumi Event Park in Yangon.

On 11 November 2019, Eternal Gosh! performed at the "Say Paung Kha Tae Yangon Nya" (Full Moon Day) Rock Music Concert together with Zaw Win Htut (Emperor Band) at Thuwunnabumi Event Park in Yangon.

On 1 February 2020, Eternal Gosh won the "2019 Most Popular New Artist Award" from the 18th annual City FM Awards, one of the two major music awards in Myanmar.

== Band members ==
Current

- Han Nay Tar—vocals (2013–present)
- Wai Gyi—guitar (2013–present)
- Ar Ray—drums (2013–present)
- Yee Mon Oo—guitar (2018–present)
- Bon Bon—bass (2018—present)

Past

- Moe Wai—bass (2013–2018)
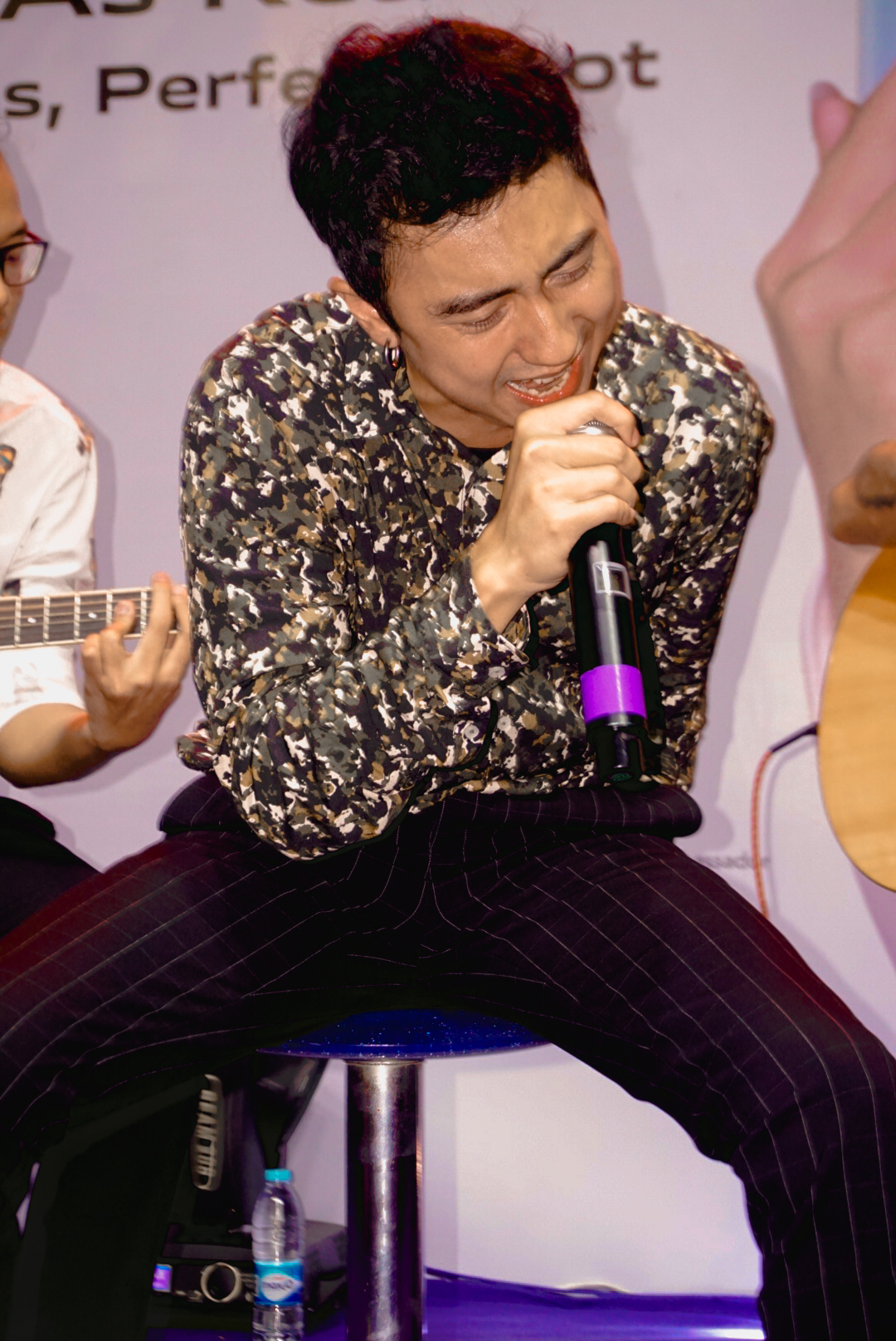
Han Nay Tar

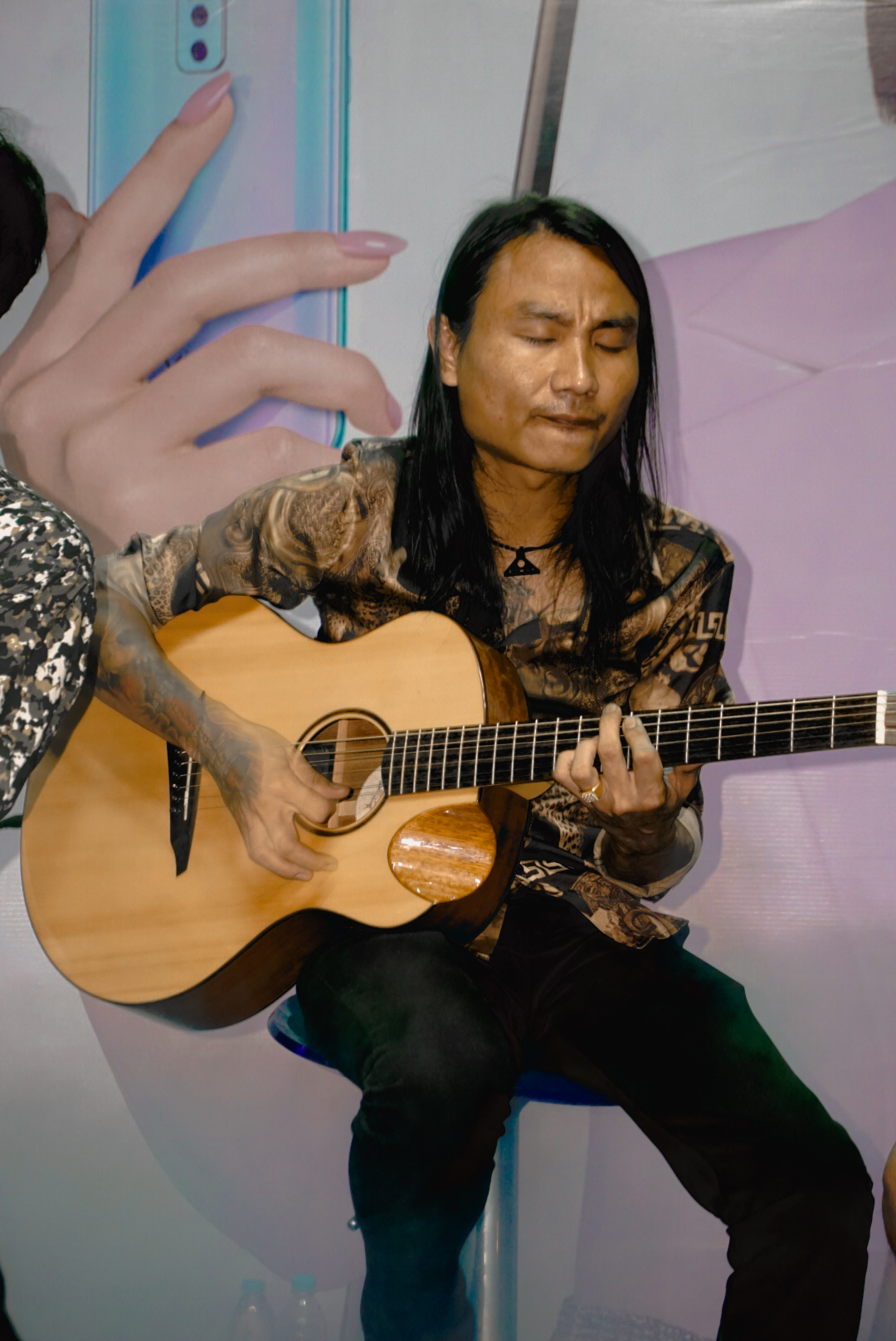
Wai Gyi

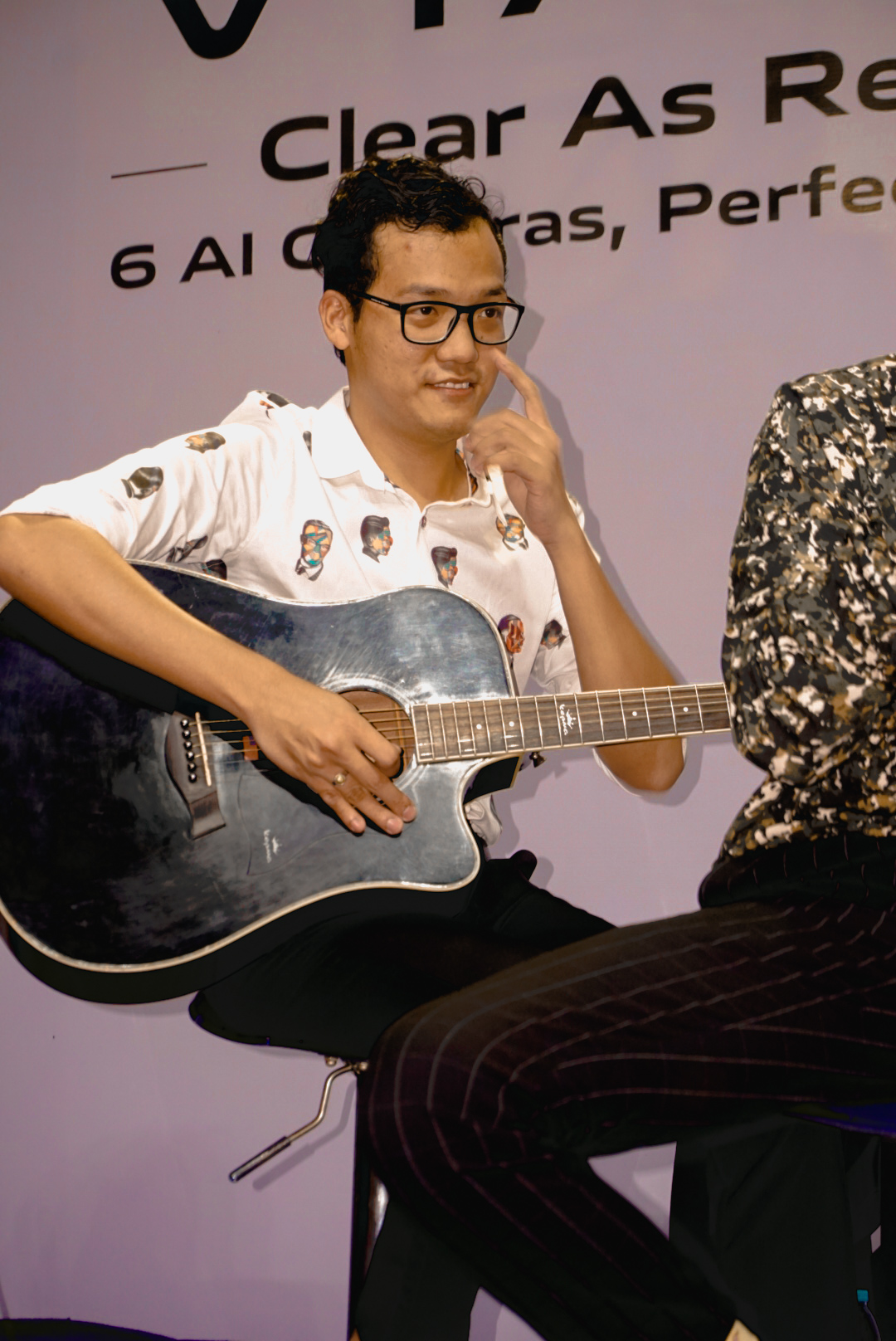
Yee Mon Oo

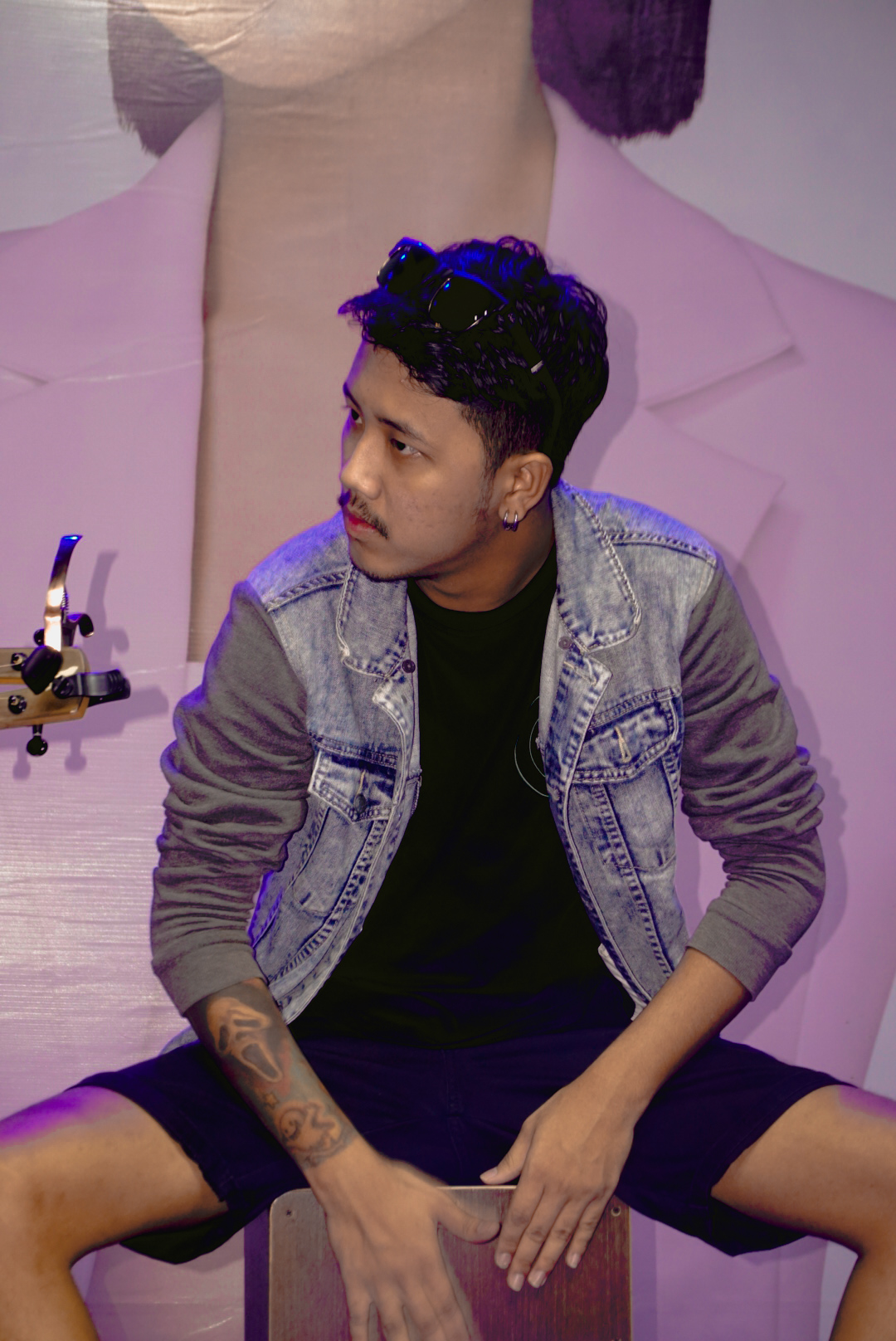
Ar Ray

== Discography ==
=== Extended plays ===
- Your Surprise Is Our Heartbeats (Y.S.I.O.H.)

No	Track	Album
01	Grandeur	Your Surprise Is Our Heartbeats EP
02	Kote Phat Htar Sel	Your Surprise Is Our Heartbeats EP
03	A Phit Ma Hoke Buu	Your Surprise Is Our Heartbeats EP
04	Lat Khote	Your Surprise Is Our Heartbeats EP
05	Mar Yar Cho Chin	Your Surprise Is Our Heartbeats EP
06	Sat Ku Lady	Your Surprise Is Our Heartbeats EP
07	Ngar Ant Aww	Your Surprise Is Our Heartbeats EP
08	Thway Chit Thway Sa Kar	Your Surprise Is Our Heartbeats EP
09	Tha Ti Ya Chin	Your Surprise Is Our Heartbeats EP

=== Studio albums ===
- The Red Sky (Kaung Kin A Ni) (2017)

No	Track	Album
01	Grandeur	The Red Sky (Kaung Kin A Ni)
02	A Chay Khan Lu Lat Tan Sar	The Red Sky (Kaung Kin A Ni)
03	La Min Yay Thaw Tan Chin	The Red Sky (Kaung Kin A Ni)
04	A Phan Tit Yar Su Taung Chin	The Red Sky (Kaung Kin A Ni)
05	Thae Moe	The Red Sky (Kaung Kin A Ni)
06	Koe Loh Kant Lant (2007)	The Red Sky (Kaung Kin A Ni)
07	Moe Ma Kha Eain Mat Kha Yan Pyar	The Red Sky (Kaung Kin A Ni)
08	Naung Ta	The Red Sky (Kaung Kin A Ni)
09	Win Lar Khae Par	The Red Sky (Kaung Kin A Ni)
10	Witt Kway	The Red Sky (Kaung Kin A Ni)
11	Mue Wyit Say Yae Thar Kaung	The Red Sky (Kaung Kin A Ni)
12	Sea Ghost	The Red Sky (Kaung Kin A Ni)

=== Singles ===
Year	Song	Album
2017	"Nga Aya"	Non-album single
2018	"Child Story"	Non-album single
2018	"Darr"	Non-album single
2018	"Nay Chi"	Non-album single
2019	"Achit Ni Darn"	Non-album single
2020	"Lu Nge Thet Tant"	Non-album single

=== (OST) Theme Music ===
Year	Song	Featured on	Length
2019	Ngwe Sakku Khunaywat	The Seven Banknotes	3:38
2022	Eain Mat Ngo Taw	Crying Forest	3:17

=== Music videos ===
Year	Song	Album
2016	"Ngar Ant Aww"	Your Surprise Is Our Heartbeats
2017	"Nga Aya"	Non-album single
2018	"Child Story"	Non-album single
2019	"Moe Ma Kha Eain Mat Kha Yan Pyar"	The Red Sky
2019	"Sea Ghost"	The Red Sky
2019	"Achit Ni Darn"	Non-album single
2020	"Lu Nge Thet Tant"	Non-album single
2020	"Chay Htauk" "Leg"	Non-album single

== Awards and nominations ==
Year	Award	Category	Nominee / work	Result
2020	City FM Music Awards	2019 Most Popular New Artist Award	Moe Ma Kha Eain Myat Khayan Pyar	Won
