= Kyin Phaw =

Burmese television series

- Poster
- Burmese: ကြင်ဖော်
- Genre: Drama
- Based on: Hna Oo Tha Baw Tu by Lun Htar Htar
- Screenplay by: Aeternum Creative
- Directed by: Pyae Phyo Naing (PPN)
- Starring: Soe Pyae Thazin; Naw Phaw Eh Htar; Wai Lar Ri; May Pan Chi; Nat Khat; Nay Lin Shein; Nay Htut; Sai Si Tom Kham
- Opening theme: "Kyin Phaw" by No No, "A Thel Nu Tok Kyauk Tar Pok" by Soe Pyae Thazin, Naw Phaw Eh Htar and Wai Lar Ri
- Ending theme: "Nwun" by Yoon Myat Thu
- Composers: No No (Kyin Phaw), Min Zaw (A Thel Nu Tok Kyauk Tar Pok), Htet Myet & Yakout (Nwun)
- Country of origin: Myanmar
- Original language: Burmese
- No. of episodes: 31 + extended episode

Production
- Executive producer: Htet Khaing Win
- Cinematography: Nyi Nyi
- Editor: Hein Htet
- Running time: 40 minutes Mondays to Fridays at 19:00 (MMT)
- Production companies: Hey Play; FG Series Production

Original release
- Network: MRTV-4
- Release: January 16 – February 28, 2025

Kyin Phaw (Burmese: ကြင်ဖော် [tɕɪ̀ɴbɔ̀]) is a Burmese drama television series directed by Pyae Phyo Naing starring Soe Pyae Thazin, Naw Phaw Eh Htar, Wai Lar Ri, May Pan Chi, Nat Khat, Nay Lin Shein, Nay Htut, Sai Si Tom Kham. It was based on the "Hna Oo Tha Baw Tu" written by Lun Htar Htar. It was produced by FG Series Production. It aired on MRTV-4, from January 16, to February 28, 2025, on Mondays to Fridays at 19:00.

== Synopsis ==
Tay Nu Yin, Chaw Kalyar, and Mann Mann May are close friends, and they also go to university together. Among the three friends, Chaw Kalyar first got a boyfriend, and his name was Khant Maw. Khant Maw had a wife, and his wife's name was Myinzuri. Khant Maw had a business license in his wife's car showroom, and with the money he earned, he supported Chaw Kalyar and secretly married her. Chaw Kalyar did not know about this. Mann Mann May also became a girlfriend to Ko Ko Nge. After marrying Ko Ko Nge, Mann Mann May was not happy because Ko Ko Nge and his family were not good to Mann Mann May. Ko Ko Nge's family wanted him to get back together with his ex-girlfriend Nandar Maung. Tay Nu Yin also became a girlfriend to Min Banya, a bad boy, and they soon got married. Chaw Kalyar knew that Khant Maw had a wife, but he could not do anything about it. Later, Chaw Kalyar gave birth to a daughter named Hnin Set, but Khant Maw lied to Chaw Kalyar that the child she gave birth to was died, and Myinzuri took the child home. Later, Chaw Kalyar found out that Mazuri had taken her away without her child dying, and she tried to get her daughter to see her. Later Mann Mann May divorced Ko Ko Nge, and Ko Ko Nge remarried to Nandar Maung. The whole family suffered from Nandar Maung's misdeeds. Tay Nu Yin also tolerated bad boy Min Banya and continued to live with him. She became frustrated with Min Banya, who was unemployed and squandering money. One day, Min Banya promised to keep Tay Nu Yin happy and went to work in Phar Kant. Tay Nu Yin also got a job in a company. The owner of the company, Eant Min Nyo, was interested in Tay Nu Yin, and he had a daughter. His daughter also loved Tay Nu Yin very much and was like her mother. Tay Nu Yin thought that Min Banya would never return and accepted Min Nyo's love but Eant Min Nyo was surprised when Min Banya returned on the same day, and her hopes were dashed. In the end, Tay Nu Yin and Min Banya lived happily, and Chaw Kalyar was also happy that Myinzuri had allowed her to see her daughter regularly, and Mann Mann May was also happy that she was no longer living together with Ko Ko Nge's family.

== Cast ==
- Soe Pyae Thazin as Tay Nu Yin
- Naw Phaw Eh Htar as Chaw Kalyar
- Wai Lar Ri as Mann Mann May
- May Pan Chi as Myinzuri
- Nat Khat as Khant Mon
- Nay Lin Shein as Ko Ko Nge
- Nay Htut as Min Banya
- Sai Si Tom Kham as Eant Min Nyo
- Hmue Htake Htar as Nandar Maung
- Hsu Myat Noe Zin as May Theint Maw
- Shoon Lae Yupar (child actress) as Hnin Sat
- Nway Oo May (child actress) as Thae Thae Nge
