= 74 Days of Love =

Burmese television series

- Official Poster
- Burmese: ရင်ခုန်သံ၇၄ရက်
- Genre: Fantasy; Mystery; Romance; Drama
- Screenplay by: Shwe Yee Shunn Lait
- Directed by: May Barani
- Starring: Khar Ra; Moe Yan Zun; Myat Noe Aye; Pyae Waddy Maung; May Thu Htun; Htet Oo Htut
- Theme music composer: Daniel Saw
- Opening theme: A Tate Hnaung Kyo
- Ending theme: A Tate Hnaung Kyo
- Country of origin: Myanmar
- Original language: Burmese
- No. of episodes: 28

Production
- Production location: Myanmar
- Running time: 40 minutes
- Production companies: Myanmar National TV; Bonanza Production

Original release
- Network: MNTV
- Release: 24 August – 30 September 2020

74 Days of Love (Burmese: ရင်ခုန်သံ၇၄ရက်) is a Burmese fantasy, mystery, romance, drama television series. It aired on MNTV, from 24 August to 30 September 2020, on Mondays to Fridays at 20:00 for 28 episodes.

== Synopsis ==
The story depicts a romantic and fantastical tale of a boy named Moe Nat Thar (The god of rain) and a girl he meets accidentally at the Thingyan Water Festival, named "Ka Nyar/Thu Thu San." Although they had been a couple for a long time, they separated after promising to meet again when the Padauk flower blossomed. When Moe Nat Thar arrived on the earth, he lived in Ka Nyar's home, they grew closer, but after 74 days, Moe Nat Thar had to return to his own place. The story concludes with a heartbreaking ending.

== Cast ==
- Khar Ra as deity of sky (Moe Nat Thar)
- Moe Yan Zun as Ati deity (Ati Nat Thar)
- Myat Noe Aye as Thu Thu San
- Pyae Wade Maung as Moon fairy (Sanda Nat Thamee)
- May Thu Htun as May Chit Tone
- Htet Oo Htut as Min Khant
