= Crying Forest =

Burmese television series

- Poster
- Burmese: အိပ်မက်ငိုတော
- Genre: Adventure; Horror; Psychological thriller Survival
- Created by: Canal+ (Myanmar)
- Screenplay by: Sein Lin@Sammy Linn
- Story by: Sein Lin@Sammy Linn
- Directed by: Kaung Zan
- Starring: Aung Min Khant; Naw Phaw Eh Htar; Shinn Myat; Shein Tin Htoo; Yadanar Bo; Htut Myat Shwe Yi
- Theme music composer: Han Nay Tar
- Opening theme: "Crying Forest" by Eternal Gosh!
- Country of origin: Myanmar
- Original language: Burmese
- No. of episodes: 10

Production
- Executive producer: Wyne Shwe Yan Lin
- Production location: Myanmar
- Running time: 60 minutes
- Production companies: Taurus V Production; Canal+ (Myanmar)

Original release
- Network: Canal+ Zat Lenn
- Release: 3 November 2022 – 5 January 2023

Crying Forest (Burmese: အိပ်မက်ငိုတော) is a Burmese adventure-horror television series. Produced by Canal+ (Myanmar) in partnership with Taurus V Production, the series aired on Canal+ Zat Lenn, from November 3, 2022 to January 5, 2023, on every Thursday at 20:00 for 10 episodes.

== Synopsis ==
Six friends who haven't seen each other for years planned a camping trip in order to reconnect. When the forest they went to, called the Dream Weeping Forest, was not as ordinary as they thought, the mysterious events that they will experience will be so haunting.

== Cast and Characters ==
=== Main ===
- Aung Min Khant as Hphone Myat
- Naw Phaw Eh Htar as Phue Phue
- Shinn Myat as Thet Paing
- Shein Tin Htoo as Kar Yan Shane
- Yadanar Bo as Yati
- Htut Myat Shwe Yee as Jue Jue

=== Recurring ===
- Thet Oo Ko as U Saw Naung
- Francis Leo as Sheriff Kyaw Soe
- Min Khant Ko as Min Aung
- Sai Kaung Min Htet as Ye Naing

== Production ==
=== Filming ===
Script preparation and casting for the series began in 2019. Filming for scenes in the Dream Weeping forest took place in Aungban, Shan State with production lasting around 3 months. Scenes set outside the forest were filmed in Yangon.

=== Music ===
Full version of the series theme song "Crying Forest" was recorded by Eternal Gosh! and released on November 2022.
