= Longing with Love =

2020 Burmese film

- Poster
- Burmese: အချစ်ဖြင့်လွမ်းစေ
- Directed by: Nay Than Maung
- Screenplay by: Nay Than Maung
- Based on: Longing with Love by Nu Nu Yi (Inwa)
- Produced by: Han Thar Nyein; Nyi Nine
- Starring: Daung; Paing Phyo Thu; Angel Lamung
- Production company: Kamayut Media
- Release date: February 13, 2020
- Running time: 122 minutes
- Country: Myanmar
- Language: Burmese

Longing with Love (Burmese: အချစ်ဖြင့်လွမ်းစေ) is a 2020 Burmese drama film, directed by Nay Than Maung starring Daung, Paing Phyo Thu and Angel Lamung. It was based on the popular novel Longing with Love written by Nu Nu Yi (Inwa). It was released as a series with 12 episodes from February 14 to May 2, 2019. The film was premiered in Myanmar Cinemas on February 13, 2020.

== Synopsis ==
The story focuses on the love triangle between three young students; Moe Mu Yar Naing, Naung Min Latt and Shin Hnin Nyo who studied and lived together on campus.

== Cast ==
- Daung as Naung Min Latt
- Paing Phyo Thu as Moe Mu Yar Naing
- Angel Lamung as Shin Hnin Nyo
- Man Hein Khant as Htain Lin
- Arkar Soe as Thura Maung
- Soe Wai Naing as Kay Sett Naing
- Aung Lwin
- Min Oo
- Myo Thandar Tun
- Chit Snow Su
- Wai Moe San
