= Tin Nyunt =

Burmese writer

- တင်ညွန့်
- Born: 1955 (age 70–71); Myanmar
- Occupations: Writer, editor, educator
- Writing career
- Genres: Politics, education, fiction, non-fiction
- Notable works: Yoma Paw Kya Tae Myet Yay (Tears on the Yoma); Kyaung Sayar Hmat Tan (A Teacher's Memoir)
- Notable awards: Youth Literature Award (2011); Political Literature Award (2012); Myanmar National Literature Award (2017)

Tin Nyunt (Burmese: တင်ညွန့်) is a Burmese writer known for his contributions to educational and political literature. He is a former educator and a recipient of the Myanmar National Literature Award.

== Career ==
Tin Nyunt spent several decades working in the education sector before transitioning into journalism and writing. From 2012 to 2018, he served as an editor at The Voice Daily, where he wrote on social and political issues.

Over the course of his career, he has authored more than 50 books across a range of genres, including political essays, educational texts, and fiction. His novel, Yoma Paw Kya Tae Myet Yay (Tears on the Yoma), received widespread recognition and was later adapted into an award-winning film.

== 2026 arrest ==
On 23 April 2026, Tin was arrested at his residence in Thanlyin Township by security forces. The arrest was reportedly linked to three of his books published between 2015 and 2020: Khway Htein Nga Tar, General, You Lied to Me, and Than Shwe's Yadayas.

According to reports, the arrest followed a TikTok live broadcast in which a book vendor promoted these publications. He was subsequently charged under Section 505(a) of the Penal Code of Myanmar. His son, along with a publisher and the vendor involved, were also detained in connection with the case.

== Awards ==
- Youth Literature Award (2011)
- Political Literature Award (2012)
- National Literature Award (2017)
