= Alice Ong =

Burmese actress and model

- အဲလစ်အုန်း
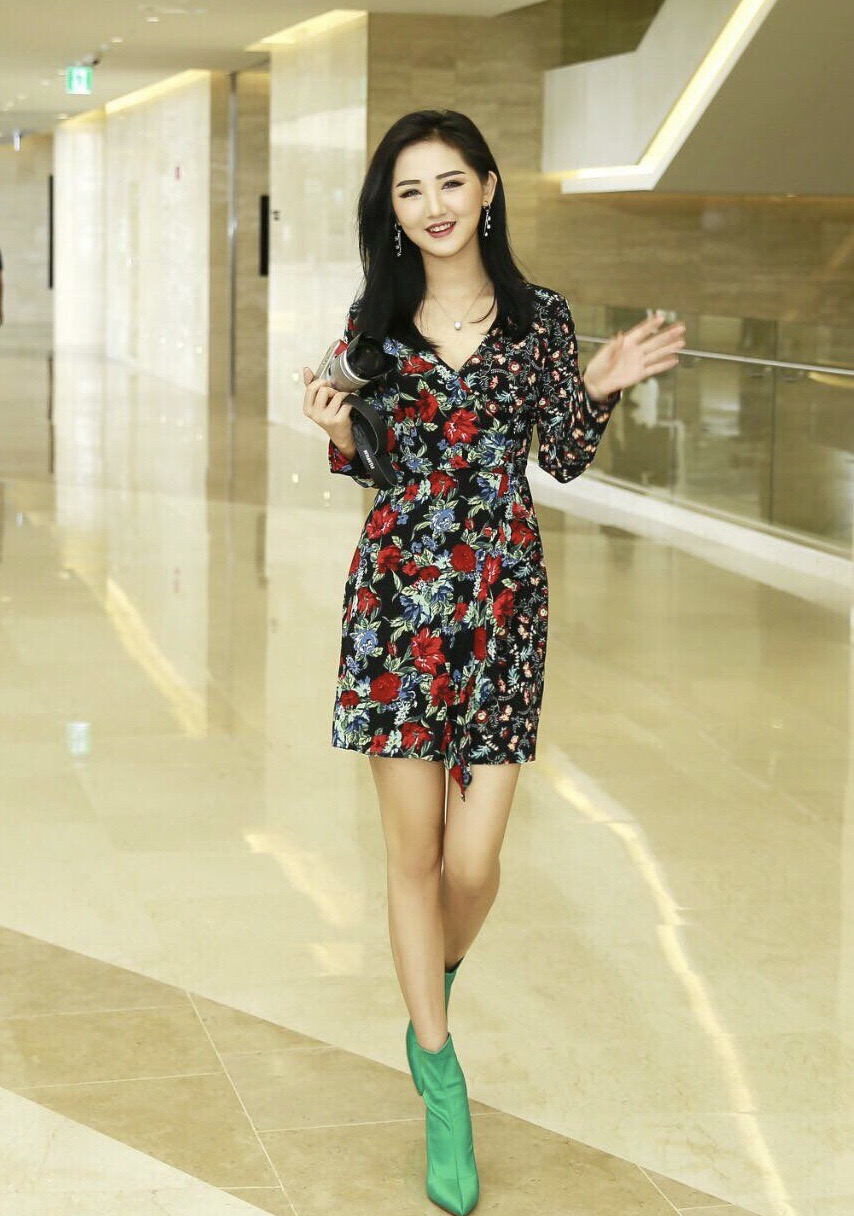
- Born: Cho Cho; August 8, 1994 (age 32); Taunggyi, Myanmar
- Education: Victoria University College; University of Wolverhampton
- Occupations: Actress, Model, Beauty queen
- Years active: 2013–present
- Height: 1.65 m (5 ft 5 in)

Alice Ong (Burmese: အဲလစ်အုန်း; Chinese: 翁如意; born Cho Cho on 8 August 1994) is a Burmese actress, model and beauty pageant title holder of Shan-Chinese descent. She gained popularity after starring in the 2018 film Dimensions which brought her wider recognition.

== Early life and education ==
Alice was born on 8 August 1994 in Taunggyi, Shan State, Myanmar. She is of Shan-Chinese descent. Her father was a Chinese from Chaozhou (Teochow), Guangdong, China, and her mother was a Yunnanese Shan-Chinese descent from Shan State, Myanmar. She is eldest daughter of four siblings, having two younger brothers and one younger sister. She graduated with a "HND diploma" from Victoria University College in 2015 and "BA honors" from University of Wolverhampton in 2018. Alice moved to Yangon from Taunggyi with her mother after her parents divorced.

== Pageantry ==
=== Modeling and local pageant ===
Alice started modeling in 2013 and also appeared on magazine cover photos as a model. She competed in the many local beauty pageant contests, and have won Miss Suko 2014, Miss Shwe Kann Tharyar and Miss PH Care and brand and appointed as brand ambassador.

=== Miss Asia Myanmar 2015 ===
Alice competed in the Miss Asia Myanmar 2015 pageant which was held on 14 November 2015 at Ngwesaung beach, Pathein. At the end of the event, she was elected to represent Myanmar at the Miss Asia 2015 pageant. After previously competing in the Miss Asia Myanmar 2015 pageant, a person who recognized her from Miss Asia Myanmar, and got many requests to act the advertisements.

== Acting career ==
=== 2016–2017: Acting debut ===
After previously competing in the Miss Asia Myanmar 2015 pageant, she became an actress. Alice made her film debut in 2016 with a leading role in the film Bella and Me, alongside Khar Ra. The film directed by May Barani and film released in May 2017.

=== 2017–present: Breaking into the big screen Canal+ Myanmar ===
Alice took on her first big-screen leading role in the action-thriller film Dimensions alongside Khar Ra, directed by Nyan Htin which premiered in Myanmar cinemas on 9 February 2018 and also screened in Singapore. The film was a domestic hit in Myanmar, and led to increased recognition for Alice Ong.

In 2018, she co-starred with Daung and Angel Lamung in the dance film Wind Up Dancer, directed by Myo Myint Shwe, and written by Nat Khat Ni. It was produced by JATAKA Film Production and premiered in Myanmar cinemas on 9 May 2019.

== Brand ambassadorships ==
Alice was appointed as brand ambassador for Canal+ Myanmar of Cha Tate Channel and Pu Tu Tue Channel in 2017. She also brand model for Vivo smartphone in 2018.

== Filmography ==
=== Film (Cinema) ===
Year	English title	Burmese title	Role	Notes
2018	Dimensions	မျက်နှာပြင်များ	Akari	Lead role
2019	Wind Up Dancer	လေဆန်ကကြိုး	Cinthia	Lead role

=== Film ===
Year	English title	Burmese title	Role	Notes
2017	Bella and Me	ဘယ်လာနှင့်ကျွန်တော်	Bella	Lead role
