= Confession of a Woman =

2020 Burmese drama film

- Film Poster
- Burmese: မိန်းမတစ်ယောက်ရဲ့ဖွင့်ဟဝန်ခံချက်
- Directed by: Mee Pwar
- Screenplay by: Ju
- Based on: A Woman's Confession by Ju
- Starring: Daung; Paing Phyo Thu; Sai Si Ton Khan
- Production company: Thinkayta Film Production
- Release date: January 9, 2020 (Myanmar)
- Running time: 120 minutes
- Country: Myanmar
- Language: Burmese

Confession of a Woman (Burmese: မိန်းမတစ်ယောက်ရဲ့ဖွင့်ဟဝန်ခံချက်) is a 2020 Burmese drama film, directed by Mee Pwar starring Daung, Paing Phyo Thu and Sai Si Ton Khan.The film, produced by Thinkayta Film Production premiered in Myanmar on January 9, 2020.

== Cast ==
- Daung as Yu Maw
- Paing Phyo Thu as Thet Hnin Eain
- Sai Si Ton Khan as Ko Aung
