= May Wynn-Maung =

Burmese actress, model and singer

- မေဝင်းမောင်
- Born: Myanmar
- Education: Rangoon Arts and Science University (RASU)
- Occupation: Actress
- Spouse: Thet Win
- Awards: Myanmar Academy Award (1980)

May Wynn-Maung (Burmese: မေဝင်းမောင်, also spelled May Win Maung) is a Burmese actress. She debuted in 1973 with the film Hla Chin Yet Sak Sak Yo, directed by U Chit Sein (Shumawa). She has acted in over 60 films.

May won her first Myanmar Academy Award for Best Actress in 1980 with the film Kyi Pyar (ကြည်ပြာ).

== Filmography ==
=== Films ===
Year	Title	Burmese title	Role	Director	Note(s)	Ref(s).
1973	Hla Chin Yet Sak Sak Yo			U Chit Sein (Shumawa)		
1980	Kyi Pyar	ကြည်ပြာ				
2023	Broken Dreams: Stories from the Myanmar Coup	ကျိုးပဲ့အိပ်မက်များ		Way	"Home" segment	

=== Television ===
Year	Title	Role	Notes
2021	New Amsterdam	Hayma Takhon	Episode: "This Be the Verse"

== Awards and nominations ==
Year	Award	Category	Nominated work	Result
1980	Myanmar Academy Award	Best Actress	Kyi Pyar	Won
