= Losing Ground (2023 film) =

Burmese short documentary film

- Burmese: ပျောက်ဆုံးခြင်း သည်မြို့ပြ
- Directed by: Anonymous
- Produced by: Anonymous LG Team
- Cinematography: Anonymous LG Team
- Edited by: Anonymous LG Team
- Release dates: April 2023 (Visions du Réel); 9 October 2023 (YIDFF)
- Running time: 23 minutes
- Country: Myanmar
- Language: Burmese

Losing Ground (Burmese: ပျောက်ဆုံးခြင်း သည်မြို့ပြ; Japanese: 負け戦でも) is a 2023 Burmese short documentary film about the situation of young citizens in Yangon, Myanmar after the country's coup d'état in 2021. Directed by an anonymous filmmaker from Yangon after his release from prison, it premiered at the 54th Visions du Réel in Nyon, Switzerland in late April 2023. The film was later screened in Japan as an entry to the "New Asian Currents" section of the 18th Yamagata International Documentary Film Festival (YIDFF) on 9 October 2023, where it won the Ogawa Shinsuke Prize, the section's highest award.

== Production ==
An anonymous male filmmaker from Yangon made the film Losing Ground after his release from prison, with his eight-month-long imprisonment being due to his participation in the nationwide protest movement after the 2021 Myanmar coup d'état.

== Accolades ==
Award	Ceremony date	Category	Recipient(s)	Result
Visions du Réel	28 April 2023	Jury Prize for the Best Short Film	Losing Ground	Won
Yamagata International Documentary Film Festival	19 October 2023	Ogawa Shinsuke Prize	Losing Ground	Won

== See also ==
- Rays of Hope, a 2023 autobiographical documentary by director Ko Pauk about his life during the Myanmar civil war
