= Bagan Myo Thu =

Burmese television series

- Burmese: ပုဂံမြို့သူ
- Genre: Drama
- Based on: Bagan Myo Thu by Mg Thein Saing
- Directed by: Kyaw Thu (ကျော်သူ)
- Starring: Kyaw Thu; Daung; May Myint Mo; Htoo Aung; Nay Chi Shoon Lak
- Theme music composer: Han Htoo Lwin
- Opening theme: Accident
- Ending theme: Accident
- Country of origin: Myanmar
- Original language: Burmese
- No. of episodes: 20

Production
- Producer: Taurus V Production
- Production location: Myanmar
- Running time: 40 minutes Mondays to Fridays at 19:00 (MMT)
- Production company: Taurus V Production

Original release
- Network: MRTV-4
- Release: 28 November – 25 December 2018

Bagan Myo Thu (Burmese: ပုဂံမြို့သူ) is a 2018 Burmese historical drama television series. It is based on the popular novel "Bagan Myo Thu" written by Mg Thein Saing. It aired on MRTV-4, from November 28 to December 25, 2018, on Mondays to Fridays at 19:00 for 20 episodes.

== Cast ==
=== Main ===
- Kyaw Thu as U Min Khaung
- Daung as Mg Mg Gyi
- May Myint Mo as Khin Saw Mu. Her name of previous life in Pagan Kingdom, was Saw Latt.
- Htoo Aung as Ko Ko Lwin
- Nay Chi Shoon Lak as Goon Nu

=== Supporting ===
- Phome Shein Khant as Kan Kaung
- Mike Mike as Pae Law
- Ei Si Kway as Khun Cho
- Zaw Oo as father of Khin Saw Mu
- Khin Moht Moht Aye as aunt of Khin Saw Mu
- Kyu Kyu Thin as Ma Thay
- Chit Su as Tar Tee

== Awards ==
| Year | Award | Category | Nominee | Result |
|---|---|---|---|---|
| 2018 | Star Awards | Best TV Series Director | Kyaw Thu | Won |
| 2018 | Star Awards | Best TV Series Actor | Daung | Won |
