= Lin Aung Khit =

Burmese actor and model

- လင်းအောင်ခေတ်
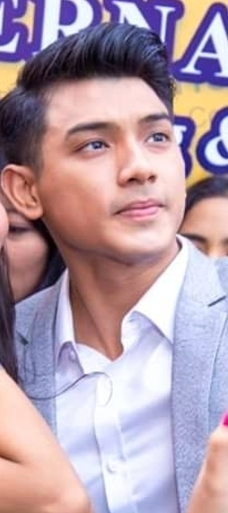
- Lin Aung Khit in 2019
- Born: Lin Aung; 18 August 1993 (age 33); Yangon, Myanmar
- Education: West Yangon Technological University
- Occupations: Actor, model
- Years active: 2014–present
- Height: 172.72 cm (5 ft 8 in)

Lin Aung Khit (Burmese: လင်းအောင်ခေတ်; born Lin Aung 18 August 1993) is a Burmese actor and model. He began his entertainment career as a runway model and had his breakthrough in the 2013 film Ta Khu Latt.

== Early life and education ==
Lin Aung Khit was born on 18 August 1993 in Yangon. He has one younger brother. He attended high school at Basic Education High School No. 2 Bahan. He graduated from West Yangon Technological University with a bachelor in Mechanical Power.

== Career ==
=== 2014–2015: Beginnings as a model ===
He joined Cho Gyi's model training Super Star Models Agency in 2014. Since then, he took professional training in modelling and catwalk. He began his entertainment career as a runway model as part of the Super Star Models Agency with countless commercial model shows and runways that had been walked on. He then competed in the male model contests and have won the title Mr. Thingyan 2014 and 1st runner-up in Kpop Award 2015. Then came the offers for TV commercials and appeared in many TV commercial advertisements. His hardwork as a model and acting in TV commercials was noticed by the film industry and soon, film casting offers came rolling in.

=== 2016–present: Acting debut and rising popularity ===
Lin Aung Khit made his acting debut with a main role in the 2016 film Achit Yaung The, Wal The, Pyupyin The, alongside Nay Min and Yin Latt, directed by Ko Zaw (Arr Yone Oo). He then starred in his second film Star of Future, alongside Zay Ye Htet and Hsu Eaint San. He has since appeared in six films include Kyar Ser, Kiss Me, and You.

Shortly after, he made his big-screen debut with Ta Khu Latt, where he played the main role with Tyron Bejay, Aung Lay, Lin Zarni Zaw, Khin Zarchi Kyaw and Myo Thandar Tun, which screened in Myanmar cinemas on 2 November 2018. He then starred in his second big-screen Bad Boy 2 (Angel of Bad Boys), where he played the main role with Zay Ye Htet, Paing Takhon, Aung Lay and Patricia.

In 2018, he portrayed his role as a school teacher Hla Win Aung in drama film Yoma Paw Kya Tae Myat Yay (Tear Drops Down The Yoma), is based on a ture story about a teacher who has to go and teach to a village in the countryside. It's a moving picture about the hardships of education staff in Myanmar. The film was screened in Myanmar cinemas on 7 November 2019 and also screened in Singapore on 9 January 2020. The same year, he starred in mini web series Late Pyar Khaung Moe, alongside Tyron Bejay, Yadanar Phyu Phyu Aung and Thiri Kyaw, produced by Media 7 which released on online in January 2018.

In 2019, he made a cameo appearances in the Hong Kong action film Line Walker 2: Invisible Spy.

== Filmography ==
=== Film ===
- Achit Yaung The, Wei The, Pyupyin The (သဘောမကောင်းတဲ့သူ) (2022)
- Star of Future (2016)
- Kyar Ser (ကျားစာ) (2017)
- Kiss Me (2017)
- You (2017)

=== Film (Cinema) ===
Year	Film	Burmese title	Note
2018	Ta Khu Latt	တစ်ခုလပ်	
2019	Yoma Paw Kya Tae Myet Yay	ရိုးမပေါ်ကျတဲ့မျက်ရည်	
2019	Line Walker 2: Invisible Spy		cameo
TBA	Bad Boy 2	လူဆိုးလေးများ၏ နတ်မိမယ် ၂	

=== Television series ===
Year	English title	Myanmar title	Network	Notes
2018	Late Pyar Khaung Moe	လိပ်ပြာခေါင်မိုး	Media 7	mini web series
