= Pan Nu Thway =

Burmese television series

- Burmese: ပန်းနုသွေး
- Genre: Melodrama
- Written by: (Creator); Jose Dennis C. Teodosio; (S1- Head-Writer); Myo Min Htwe; (Episode-Writer); Myo Min Htwe; Ei Phyu Moe; Soe Lu Zaw; (season 1 Writers); Moe Hein June; Aye Kyi Thar Han; Angel Ko Ko; Kyaw Kyaw Htoo; Kyi Phyu Lwin; Kyaw Min Soe; Hay Mar San; Aye Moht Moht Aung; Naing Ko Ko; Aye Chan Mon
- Directed by: Pyi Thit Naing *Htinn Kyaw; Hla Phyo
- Starring: May Myint Mo; Myat Thu Kyaw; May Mi Kyaw Kyaw; Sai Nay Phyo; Chue Lay; Kyaw Hsu; Lin Myat; See below
- Theme music composer: Myint Moe Aung
- Country of origin: Myanmar
- Original language: Burmese
- No. of seasons: 2
- No. of episodes: 121 (61+60)

Production
- Executive producer: Khin Lay
- Producers: Naing Than; Hla Phyo
- Production location: Myanmar
- Editors: May Thandar; Khin Htet Paing Oo; Sai Dan Latt; Hnin Thandar Myo; Ei Hnin Wai; Pan Ei Naing Thu; Hnin Nway Oo Hlaing; Honey Lin
- Running time: 30 minutes
- Production company: Forever Group

Original release
- Network: MRTV-4
- Release: November 6, 2013 – March 31, 2015

Pan Nu Thway (Burmese: ပန်းနုသွေး) is a Burmese melodrama television series. Its season 1 aired on MRTV-4, from November 6, 2013, to January 29, 2014, on Mondays to Fridays at 19:15 for 61 episodes and season 2 aired from January 6 to March 31, 2015 for 60 episodes.

== Cast and characters ==
=== Main ===
- May Myint Mo as Pan Nu Thway
- Myat Thu Kyaw as Tayza Min Maung
- May Mi Kyaw Kyaw as Honey Khin
- Sai Nay Phyo as Pyae Sone
- Chue Lay as Chue Shwe Li (season 2)
- Kyaw Hsu as Htoo Wai (season 2)
- Lin Myat as Thu Rain (season 2)

=== Supporting ===
- Khin Moht Moht Aye as Daw Khin Than Kywal, Honey Khin's mother
- Theingi Htun as Daw Pearl, Pan Nu Thway's mother
- Daung Wai as Arnold
- Min Khant (child actor) as Phoe Lone
- Goon Pone Gyi as Kyi Kyi Thit
- Zaw Win Naing as U Htun Tauk (season 2)
- Shwe Eain Min as Htar Htar Wai (season 2)
- Shoon Pyae Paing as Daw Khin Ma Ma (season 2)
- Thet Oo Ko as Thiha (season 2)
