= Dimensions (2018 film) =

- Burmese: မျက်နှာပြင်များ
- Directed by: Nyan Htin
- Produced by: Shutter Production; Bonanza Production
- Starring: Alice Ong; Khar Ra; Ja Seng Ing; Min Myat Soe San; Win Myaing
- Cinematography: Kar Yan
- Edited by: Nyan Htin
- Music by: Shalom M. Reynor
- Release date: 9 February 2018
- Country: Myanmar
- Languages: Burmese; English

Dimensions (Burmese: မျက်နှာပြင်များ) is a 2018 Burmese action-thriller film directed by Nyan Htin and starring Khar Ra, Alice Ong, Ja Seng Ing, Min Myat Soe San, and Win Myaing performed in this film. The film was presented by Shutter Production in association with Bonanza Production. The film premiered in Myanmar cinemas on 9 February 2018 and also screened in Singapore on 9 August 2018.

This film was achieved Best Music Awards at the 2018 Myanmar Motion Picture Academy Awards.

== Plot ==
A young man woke up inside an apartment in Yangon with a travelling hand bag beside him. He realized that he doesn't remember anything from the past. Not his name, his job, his address. Nothing. He didn't know whose apartment he was in. Not a single family member or friend beside him. There's nothing inside his hand bag except a few money and clothes. He tried to ask around among the neighbors. But no one seemed to know who he was. With a lot of questions and not being able to do anything about it, he tried to settle down in that little apartment.

Days passed. And no one came. One day, on the way back to his apartment, he was attacked by a horrible headache and blacked out. He found himself waking up in another place with blood on his hands and a corpse beside him. He realized that he had killed someone. Terrified of what he had done, he hurried back to the apartment.

Over a couple of weeks, he found himself doing the same thing three more times. He decided to go to the police and tell them what he did. He told the police the locations of the places where he killed people and asked them to lock him up. The police investigated and found nothing. No corpses. No murder cases opened. They decided to transfer him to a psychiatrist hospital. On the way to the hospital he blacked out again and found himself in another place. A phone call came and a woman on the phone told him that she can explain everything that is happening.

== Cast ==
- Khar Ra
- Alice Ong
- Ja Seng Ing
- Min Myat Soe San
- Win Myaing

== Awards and nominations ==
Year	Award	Category	Nominee	Result
2018	Myanmar Motion Picture Academy Awards	Best Music	Shalon-M-Rawnan	Won
2018	Star Award	Best Rising Star(Male)	Kharra	Won
