= The Missing Truth =

- Official poster
- Burmese: ပျောက်ဆုံးနေသောအမှန်တရား
- Genre: Thriller; Drama
- Directed by: Kaung Zan
- Starring: May Myint Mo; Naw Phaw Eh Htar; Lu Min; Aung Ye Htike; Kaung Myat San; Htoo Aung
- Country of origin: Myanmar
- Original language: Burmese
- No. of episodes: 20

Production
- Executive producer: Khin Lay
- Producers: Naing Than; Kaung Zan; Wyne Shwe Yan Lin
- Production location: Myanmar
- Running time: 40 minutes Mondays to Fridays at 19:00 (MMT)
- Production company: Taraus V Production

Original release
- Network: MRTV-4
- Release: 19 September – 16 October 2019

The Missing Truth (Burmese: ပျောက်ဆုံးနေသောအမှန်တရား) is a 2019 Burmese thriller drama series starring May Myint Mo, Naw Phaw Eh Htar, Lu Min, Aung Ye Htike, Kaung Myat San and Htoo Aung. It aired on MRTV-4 from September 19 to October 16, 2019, on Mondays to Fridays at 19:00 for 20 episodes.

The series is directed by Kaung Zan and produced by Taraus V Production, held premiere show on September 14, 2019 in Junction City JCGV, Yangon. It was also banned from watching series under the age of 13 due to some graphical violence.

== Synopsis ==
Emphasizing on a father's unconditional and imprudent love for his children, U Phone Myint Htet can provide the strongest foundation for physical development yet lack in mental support. This leads to his youngest son Zwe Htet's inferiority and unintended crimes despite coming from a wealthy family. Meanwhile, the family of U Phone Myint Htet’s business competitor was mysteriously murdered while on vacation. No justification, no lead, but one missing person; the body of family’s daughter. Afterwards, Thudra, the ghost of the missing girl reappears as a vengeful spirit to seek revenge over her family’s massacre. Due to her addiction to social media, she begins hunting down and killing everyone who played a role in the homicide using a bizarre method by going live on social media.

== Cast ==
=== Main ===
- May Myint Mo as May Htet Cho
- Naw Phaw Eh Htar as Thudra
- Lu Min as U Phone Myint Htet
- Aung Ye Htike as Zwe Htet
- Htoo Aung as Kaung Htet
- Kaung Myat San as Nay Lin Thit

=== Supporting ===
- Thun Thitsar Zaw as Shwe Khat
- Aung Khant Hmue as Min Naing
- Soe Pyay Myint as Naung Naung
- La Pyae as Wai Yan
