= A Kyin Nar Myit Phyar =

Burmese television series

- Burmese: အကြင်နာမြစ်ဖျား
- Genre: Drama
- Directed by: Thar Nyi
- Starring: Moe Yan Zun; Khin Wint Wah; Htoo Aung; Wai Lyan; Htet Htet Htun; May Kabyar Oo
- Opening theme: A Naung A Phwae (အနှောင်အဖွဲ့)
- Ending theme: A Naung A Phwae (အနှောင်အဖွဲ့)
- Composers: Wai Gyi; Shine Wai Yan
- Country of origin: Myanmar
- Original language: Burmese
- No. of episodes: 20

Production
- Producer: Myanmar Media-7
- Production location: Myanmar
- Editors: Uno Lwin; Win Thant Aun (A Win)
- Running time: 40 minutes Mondays to Fridays at 20:45 (MMT)
- Production company: Myanmar Media-7

Original release
- Network: MRTV-4
- Release: 23 October – 19 November 2019

A Kyin Nar Myit Phyar (Burmese: အကြင်နာမြစ်ဖျား) is a 2019 Burmese drama television series. It aired on MRTV-4, from October 23 to November 19, 2019, on Mondays to Fridays at 20:45 for 20 episodes.

== Cast ==
- Moe Yan Zun as Thurain
- Khin Wint Wah as Chaw Su
- Htoo Aung as Deputy Sheriff Arkar
- Wai Lyan as Aung Aung
- Htet Htet Htun as Cherry
- May Kabyar Oo as Su Hlaing
