= Daung =

Burmese actor and former footballer

- ဒေါင်း
- Born: Thura Aung (သူရအောင်); 30 March 1990 (age 36); Minhla, Bago Division, Burma
- Occupations: Actor; Footballer; Model
- Years active: 2015–present
- Awards: Star Awards 2018 – Best Actor Award (Bagan Myo Thu Drama Series)

Daung (Burmese: ဒေါင်း; lit. 'Peafowl', born Thura Aung; 30 March 1990) is a Burmese film and television actor and former footballer. He first gained widespread fame in Myanmar through his role in the 2019 film The Only Mom. Daung is known for his method acting performances, in contrast to the more typical melodramatic forms of acting popular in Burmese cinema.

== Early life ==
Daung was born on 30 March 1990 in Minhla, Tharyarwaddy District, Bago Division, Burma. He is the 4th son of 5 siblings. He moved to Mandalay in the second grade.

Daung was already interested in music as a child, teaching himself traditional Burmese songs on guitar by fifth grade. (Note: 10–11 years old. See Education in Myanmar.) By tenth grade, he had moved to Yangon as a self-taught singer-songwriter, aiming for a career in the city's music industry. (Note: 15–16 years old. See Education in Myanmar.)

== Club career ==
=== Southern Myanmar F.C ===
While pursuing music, he was scouted for professional football. In 2012, he signed as a striker for Southern Myanmar F.C., a Mawlamyine-based club predominantly operating from Yangon. After a few years, he decided to leave football.

== Entertainment career ==
=== 2015–2017: Acting debut and recognition ===
Daung made his acting debut with a leading role in the film The Second Heart in 2015, after being selected by Satori Creative Works, a film production company, from among almost 500 amateur actors. He then starred a male lead in the film Little Umbrella Story alongside Paing Phyo Thu in 2017. The film was both a domestic hit in Myanmar, and led to increased recognition for Daung.

His stage name, "Daung" (ဒေါင်း), meaning "Peacock," was chosen by him from a list provided by Satori, primarily for its uniqueness. The peacock is a significant national symbol in Myanmar, associated with the Konbaung monarchy and the anti-colonial nationalist movement.

In 2017, he gain increased attention and popularity with his role as Maung Maung Gyi in the television series Bagan Myo Thu alongside May Myint Mo and Htoo Aung, aired on MRTV-4 on 28 November 2018 which was a huge commercial success, topping television ratings and becoming the most watched Burmese television drama at that time.

=== 2018–present: Breaking into the big screen and success ===
In 2018, he took on his first big-screen leading role in the horror-thriller film The Only Mom, alongside actress Wutt Hmone Shwe Yi and actor Nine Nine, directed by Chatchai Katenut, which premiered in Myanmar cinemas on 8 February 2019 stayed in local theaters for a record seven weeks and was also screened in 13 other nations.

The same year, he portrayed the male lead in the big-screen film Wind up Dancer, directed by Myo Myint Shwe, and written by Nat Khat Ni. It was produced by JATAKA Film Production and premiered in Myanmar cinemas on 9 May 2019. And then, he starred in the television series Longing with Love where he played the leading role with Paing Phyo Thu and Angel Lamung, aired by Kamayut Media. After this film, he starred in the epic drama film Legend of the Rain alongside Wutt Hmone Shwe Yi, Ye Deight and Shwe Htoo, directed by Win Lwin Htet which screened in Myanmar cinemas on 11 July 2019 and processed huge hit and successes.

In 2020, he became the ambassador for the Doh Gabar campaign, an environmental awareness campaign, alongside actresses Swe Zin Htaik and Aye Wutyi Thaung. In addition, in 2022, he was also cast in the Thailand drama series From Chao Phraya to Irrawaddy directed by Chatchai Katenut and produced by Thai PBS.

He attended the Nineentertain awards 2023 held in Thailand on May 25, 2023. The TV drama, From Chao Phraya to Irrawaddy in which he starred won the Best TV Drama of the Year and Best Creative Team of the Year awards.

== Political activities ==
Following the 2021 Myanmar coup d'état, he participated in the anti-coup movement both in person at rallies and through social media. He lobbied for the Civil Disobedience Movement in opposition to the regime. As a result of his activism, he was targeted with false rumors alleging he had a relationship with the regime leader's daughter which he strongly rejected in an interview.

On 12 April 2021, warrants for his arrest were issued under Section 505 (a) of the Myanmar Penal Code by the State Administration Council for speaking out against the military coup. Along with several other celebrities, he was charged with calling for participation in the Civil Disobedience Movement and damaging the state's ability to govern, with supporting the Committee Representing Pyidaungsu Hluttaw, and with generally inciting the people to disturb the peace and stability of the nation.

== Filmography ==
=== Film (Cinema) ===
- The Only Mom (လိပ်ပြာစံအိမ်) (2019)
- Wind Up Dancer (လေဆန်ကကြိုး) (2019)
- Legend of the Rain (ဒဏ္ဍာရီမိုး) (2019)
- 1014 (၁၀၁၄) (2019)
- Confession of a Woman (မိန်းမတစ်ယောက်၏ ဖွင့်ဟဝန်ခံချက်) (2020)
- Longing with Love (အချစ်ဖြင့်လွမ်းစေ) (2020)
- Ayoke Kya Yar Say Sat Htin (အရုပ်ကျရာ ဆေးစက်ထင်) (TBA)
- Mind away under the Moon (လရဲ့အောက်ဘက်မိုင်အဝေးမှာ) (TBA)
- Omukade (First Thai film) (TBA)
- Wutt Lae Taw Shwe PaSoe Tann Htoe Loe Kyo Mal (ဝတ်လဲတော်ရွှေပုဆိုးတန်းထိုးလို့ကြိုမယ်) (TBA)
- Surveillance Hnin Maung Vs Sanay Maung Maung (ဆားပုလဲနှင်းမောင်နှင့်စနေမောင်မောင် (TBA)
- Love Equation (TBA)

=== Film ===
- The Second Heart (ဒုတိယနှလုံးသား) (2016)
- Father's School (အဖေ့ကျောင်း) (2016)
- Little Umbrella Story (ထီးကလေးပုံပြင်) (2017)

=== Television series ===
- Bagan Myo Thu (ပုဂံမြို့သူ) (2017)
- Longing with Love (အချစ်ဖြင့်လွမ်းစေ) (2019)
- From Chao Phraya to Irrawaddy (ကျောက်ဖရားမှဧရာဝတီသို့) (2022)
