= May Myint Mo =

Burmese actress (born 1995)

- မေမြင့်မိုရ်
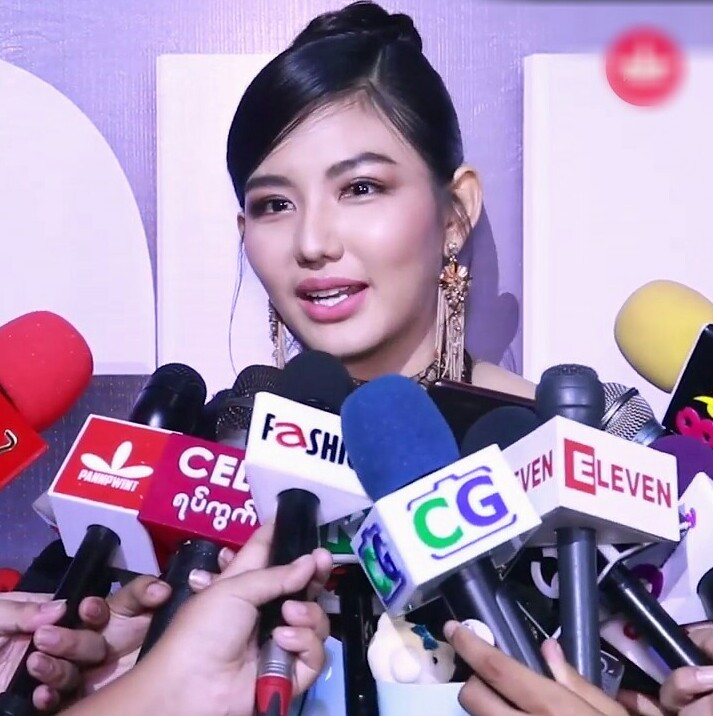
- Born: May Myint Mo Aung; May 11, 1995 (age 31); Yangon, Myanmar
- Other names: May, May Lay
- Citizenship: Myanmar
- Education: University of Yangon
- Occupation: Actress
- Years active: 2012–present
- Parent(s): Aung Ko; Myintzu Htut
- Relatives: Shinn Myat (brother)
- Awards: 2018 Star Award for Rising Star Award (Female); Myanmar Academy Award (Best Supporting Actress for 2023)

May Myint Mo (Burmese: မေမြင့်မိုရ်; born May Myint Mo Aung 11 May 1995) is a Burmese actress nurtured by MRTV-4. She gained widespread popularity after starring in the MRTV-4 series Pan Nu Thway (2013) and A Yake (2018). She has received Myanmar Academy Awards, for Best Supporting Actress in 2012 for her performance in Mone Khwint.

== Early life and education ==
May Myint Mo was born on 11 May 1995 in Yangon, Myanmar to Aung Ko and Myintzu Htut. She has one younger sibling, Shinn Myat, an actor. She attended high school at Basic Education High School No. 1 Dagon and graduated from the University of Yangon in 2016 with an LLB degree.

== Career ==
May began her modeling career in 2012 while a student. She also appeared on music videos, magazine cover photos and as a model for many advertisements. She made her acting debut with in the third season of The Sign of Love, after being selected by Forever Group from among almost 100 amateur actresses.

In 2013, she starred in her second television drama, Pan Nu Thway, where she played the leading role with Myat Thu Kyaw. It aired on MRTV-4 and she received positive reviews for her portrayal of Pan Nu Thway, which led to increased popularity for her. The show's second season aired in 2014.

In 2017, she co-starred with Sithu Win and Aung Yay Chan in the drama Sone See Chin Moe Tain Myar. In 2017, she gained increased attention and popularity with her role as Su Su Hlaing in the hit drama A Yake (Shadow). The series is adapted from Ma Sandar's novel A Yake (The Shadow) and a remake of the popular 1997 film A Yake based on the same novel. May earned praise for her performance and character interpretation and experienced a resurgence of popularity.

In 2018, she starred in the historical drama Bagan Myo Thu alongside Daung and Htoo Aung. She won the "Rising Star Award (Female)" at the 2018 Star Awards for her performance in the film Moe Pann Pwint Yae Thin-Kay-Ta.

She took on her first big-screen role in the film Magical Inscription in 2018. In the same year, she portrayed the female lead in the film Moe Pann Pwint Yae Thin-Kay-Ta (The Sign of the Sky Flower).

In 2019, she starred in the thriller drama series The Missing Truth.

In 2023, she received the Myanmar Academy Awards for her work in the film Mone Khwint, winning in the category of Best Supporting Actress.

She starred in a military propaganda short film Those Who Will Gallop Through History (ခေတ်သမိုင်းကို ဒုန်းစိုင်းမည့်သူများ), produced by the junta and released on October 25, 2025. The film depicts events from the 2021 military coup to the planned general election, portraying the Civil Disobedience Movement (CDM), youth emigration, and armed resistance groups in a critical light. Following its release, she faced public criticism over her involvement in the film. State media reported that legal action would be taken against individuals who publicly criticized the production.

== Social works ==
In 2018, she drove a funeral car for a philanthropic team led by Kyaw Thu.

On August 24, 2018, May Myint Mo donated 480 cans of pea oil to a charity supporting flood-affected people in Myanmar.

== Boycott ==
In 2024, May Myint Mo became a target of anti-junta activists because she began performing in films and TV series produced by junta-linked companies like 7th Sense Creation, owned by Khin Thiri Thet Mon, daughter of junta chief Min Aung Hlaing. As a result, fans and nationals warned her that they would boycott her work if she continued to collaborate with military-linked film production companies. On July 20, 2024, she faced protests from an anti-junta Burmese community in Mae Sot when she attended the opening ceremony of the MLM brand SP Coffee. Reports indicate that May Myint Mo left the event shortly after arriving due to protesters attempting to throw eggs at her.

== Filmography ==
=== Film ===
- Mhaw Kyauk Sar (မှော်ကျောက်စာ) (2018)
- Sign of Moe Pan Pwint (မိုးပန်းပွင့်ရဲ့သင်္ကေတ) (2018)
- A Chit Sone Crush? (အချစ်ဆုံးCrush?) (2019)
- 1014 (၁၀၁၄) (2019)
- Kyauk Kyauk Kyauk 2 (ကြောက်ကြောက်ကြောက်၂) (2019)
- Yoma Paw Kya Tae Myet Yay (ရိုးမပေါ်ကျတဲ့မျက်ရည်) (2019)
- Yee Ywae Moe (ရည်ရွယ်မိုး) (2023)
- Fourth Capillary (စတုတ္ထမြောက်သွေးကြောမျှင်) (2023)
- Lay Pat Car (လေပတ်ကား) (2023)
- Mone Khwint (မုန်းခွင့်) (2023)
- Sarateta (စာရိတ္တ) (2023)
- Calling (ခေါ်သံ) TBA
- Blood Debt (သွေးကြွေး) TBA

=== Television series ===
- The Sign of Love: Season 3 (2013)
- Pan Nu Thway: Season 1 (2013)
- Pan Nu Thway: Season 2 (2015)
- Sone See Chin Moe Tain Myar (2017)
- A Yake (2018)
- Bagan Myo Thu (2018)
- The Missing Truth (2019)
- Legends of Warriors (2020)
- Ywar Lal Tae Phoo Sar (2022)
- Kar Yan Lwae Myittar (2023)
- Kar Yan Lwae Myittar: Season 2 (2024)

== Awards and nominations ==
On March 2, 2026, she was conferred the Medal for Excellent Performance in Social Field (First Class), one of the highest national medals awarded by the Government of Myanmar for exceptional contributions to social welfare.

=== Film Awards ===
Year	Award	Category	Nominated work	Result
2018	Star Award	Rising Star Award (Female)	Sign of Moe Pan Pwint	Won
2023	Myanmar Academy Award	Best Supporting Actress	Mone Khwint	Won
