= Broken Dreams: Stories from the Myanmar Coup =

- Burmese: ကျိုးပဲ့အိပ်မက်များ
- Directed by: The Ninefold Mosaic
- Produced by: Myat Noe; Mehm Thet Win
- Starring: Aung; Myat Noe Aye; Priscilla Bawicia; Nay Chi; Japan Gyi; Novem Htoo; Poe Meh; Kyaw Meh; La Moe; Aung Myint Myat; Preh Reh; Russell; Paing Phyoe Thu; Chit Thu Wai; May Wynn-Maung; Flynn the Fish
- Cinematography: Yit Moe Thorn; Manila
- Edited by: The Ninefold Mosaic
- Music by: Lin Htet; Lynn Lynn; Zay Zay
- Release dates: September 7, 2023 (FCCT); December 10, 2023 (Kolkata Film Festival)
- Running time: 128 minutes
- Country: Myanmar
- Languages: Burmese; English (Home); Karenni (Dancing in the Dark)

Broken Dreams: Stories from the Myanmar Coup (Burmese: ကျိုးပဲ့အိပ်မက်များ) is a 2023 Burmese anthology film which consists of nine stories related to the 2021 Myanmar coup d'état and the resulting civil war. Edited and directed by the Ninefold Mosaic, a partially anonymous group of eight filmmakers, it was first screened in Thailand at the Foreign Correspondents' Club of Thailand (FCCT) in Bangkok on 7 September 2023, and was later screened as an entry to the 29th Kolkata International Film Festival on 10 December, where it won the NETPAC Award.

== Short films ==
- Samsara (directed by Nay Ni Hlaing Kha)

Starring Aung

- Dark Tangle (directed by Yit)

Starring Chit Thu Wai

- Two Souls (directed by Myat Noe)

Starring Aung Myint Myat and Russell

- Home (directed by Way)

Starring Priscilla Bawicia and May Wynn-Maung

- To a Dear Little Seedling (directed by Nay Chi Myat Noe Wint)

Starring Nay Chi Myat Noe Wint

- The Dictator's Bathroom (directed by L. Minpyae Mon)

Starring Myat Noe Aye, Novem Htoo and Japan Gyi

- Un- (directed by Rek)

Starring Flynn the Fish

- Dancing in the Dark (directed by Bo Thet Htun)

Starring La Moe, Poe Meh, Preh Reh and Kyaw Meh

- Late Pyar (directed by Yit)

Starring Myat Noe Aye and Paing Phyoe Thu

== Production ==
Most of the cast and crew members of Broken Dreams were in exile during production of the film. Some of the directors grouped in the Ninefold Mosaic had previously worked on the 2022 collage film Myanmar Diaries, to which Broken Dreams is considered a follow-up.

== Release ==
Broken Dreams was first screened in Thailand at the Foreign Correspondents' Club of Thailand (FCCT) in Bangkok on 7 September 2023, with Nikkei Asia editor-at-large and former FCCT president Gwen Robinson moderating the question-and-answer session. After further editing, the film was later screened at the SEA Junction within the Bangkok Art and Culture Centre on 11 November. It was also screened on 10 December, with director Bo Thet Htun in attendance, as an entry to the "Asian Select" section of the 29th Kolkata International Film Festival, where it won the NETPAC Award.

In Europe, the film was screened in Munich, Germany on 29 December 2023.

Frontier Myanmar noted that some viewers have complained on social media about the abstruseness of many of the segments.
