= Yoma Paw Kya Tae Myet Yay =

Burmese Film

- Official Poster
- Burmese: ရိုးမပေါ်ကျတဲ့မျက်ရည်
- Directed by: Ko Pauk
- Screenplay by: Thet Oo Maung; Min Thakhin
- Based on: Yoma Paw Kya Tae Myet Yay by Tin Nyunt
- Starring: Myint Myat; Htoo Aung; Aung Yay Chan; Kaung Myat San; Lin Aung Khit; Eaindra Kyaw Zin; Khine Thin Kyi; May Myint Mo
- Production company: Bo Bo Film Production
- Release date: November 7, 2019
- Running time: 120 minutes
- Country: Myanmar
- Language: Burmese

Yoma Paw Kya Tae Myet Yay (Burmese: ရိုးမပေါ်ကျတဲ့မျက်ရည်) is a 2019 Burmese drama film starring Myint Myat, Htoo Aung, Aung Yay Chan, Kaung Myat San, Lin Aung Khit, Eaindra Kyaw Zin, Khine Thin Kyi, May Myint Mo. The film, produced by Bo Bo Film Production premiered in Myanmar on November 7, 2019.

== Cast ==
- Myint Myat as Tin Maung Win
- Htoo Aung as Aung Lwin
- Aung Yay Chan as Win Chit
- Kaung Myat San as San Naing
- Lin Aung Khit as Hla Win Aung
- Eaindra Kyaw Zin as Ko Toe
- Khine Thin Kyi as Phyu Phyu Myint
- May Myint Mo as Malar
- Khin Hlaing as Tin Soe
- Min Thu as U Khin Maung
- Thel Nandar Soe as Khin Mar Aye
- Zaw Maing as Po Daung
