= LadyBoy =

2019 Burmese film

- film poster
- Burmese: လေဒီဘွိုင်း
- Directed by: Ko Pauk
- Screenplay by: Thet Oo Maung; Nyi Nyi Ba Maung; Min Thakhin
- Story by: Danote Ko Ko Zaw
- Starring: Pyay Ti Oo; Kyaw Kyaw Bo; Htoo Aung; Ei Chaw Po; Kaew Korravee; Khin Hlaing; Joker; Bank; P Nok; K Nyi
- Production company: Bo Bo Film Production
- Release date: June 6, 2019 (Myanmar)
- Running time: 120 minutes
- Countries: Myanmar; Thailand
- Languages: Burmese; Thai

LadyBoy (Burmese: လေဒီဘွိုင်း) is a 2019 Burmese comedy-drama action film, directed by Ko Pauk starring Pyay Ti Oo, Kyaw Kyaw Bo, Htoo Aung, Ei Chaw Po, Kaew Korravee, Khin Hlaing, Joker, Bank, P Nok and K Nyi. The film was filmed in collaboration with actors from Thailand and was shot in Bangkok, Thailand; produced by Bo Bo Film Production premiered Myanmar on June 6, 2019.

== Cast ==
- Pyay Ti Oo as Aung Shwe
- Kyaw Kyaw Bo as Kyaw Kyaw Naing
- Htoo Ag as Kideset
- Ei Chaw Po as Cynthia
- Kaew Korravee as Kide
- Khin Hlaing as Ngwe Maung
- Joker as Jo Jo
- Bank as Gangster1#
- P Nok as Gangster leader
- K Nyi as Aung Gyi
