= Khar Ra =

Burmese actor, model and singer

- ခါရာ
- Born: Myo Htut Naing; 21 October 1993 (age 32); Mogok, Myanmar
- Education: Dagon University
- Occupations: Actor; Model; Singer
- Years active: 2013–present
- Height: 6 ft 0 in (1.83 m)
- Parents: Myint Oo (father); Nang Sein (mother)

Khar Ra (Burmese: ခါရာ, also spelt Kharra; born Myo Htut Naing; 21 October 1993) is a Burmese actor, model and singer of ethnic Shan-Chinese descent. He gained popularity after starring in the 2018 film Dimensions which brought him wider recognition.

== Early life and education ==
Khar Ra was born on 21 October 1993 in Mogok, Myanmar to ethnic Shan-Chinese parent Myint Oo and his wife Nang Sein. He is the eldest son of three siblings, having a younger sister and younger brother. He attended high school at Basic Education High School No. 1 Mogok and graduated from Dagon University with a degree in English.

== Modeling and male pageantry ==
Khar Ra began his modeling career in 2013, and then he competed in the male model contest The First Myanmar Guys 2013. He also appeared on magazine cover photos and as model for many advertisements. He joined the second edition of Miss Golden Land Myanmar which was held on 21 August 201. At the end of the event, he won Mr. Asia Myanmar 2014 and represented Myanmar at the Mr. Asia Contest 2014.

In 2016, he was awarded Asia Model Star Award by Korea Model Association.

=== Mr. Asia 2014 ===
Khar Ra competed in the 2014 Mr. Asia Contest, along with participants from 50 other nations which was held on 27 August to 27 September in Hong Kong. He placed as the 2nd runner-up and won four continental title awards for Mister Viewer's Choice Award, Mister Gorgeous, Mister Charismatic, and Missosology Top Favourite Award.

== Music career ==
Khar Ra is also a singer. He started singing in 2015, and released his debut album "Ka Lane Ka Kyait" (Deceit) which was a duet album with his partner Nora Ko on 14 February 2016.

== Acting career ==
=== 2017–2018: Film debut and recognition ===
Rising to fame in 2017, he became an actor. He made his acting debut with a leading role in the film The Accident alongside Thinzar Nwe Win in 2017. He then starred in his second film Bella and Me where he played the leading role with Alice Ong and also starred in his third film Unstoppable in 2017. The films was both a domestic hit, and led to increased recognition for Khar Ra.

=== 2018–present: Breaking into the big screen ===
Khar Ra took on his first big-screen leading role in the action-thriller film Dimensions alongside Alice Ong, directed by Nyan Htin which premiered in Myanmar cinemas on 9 February 2018 and was also screened in Singapore.

In the same year, he starred in the big-screen film Poisoned Savages where he played the leading role with actor Naing Naing and Tun Ko Ko, which premiered in Myanmar cinemas on 30 November 2018. He then portrayed the male lead in the big-screen film City Hunters, an action film alongside actress Pyae Wade Maung which premiered in Myanmar cinemas on 1 March 2019.

In 2018, he portrayed his role as Ye Naung in the popular television series It was on Yesterday 2, alongside Kyaw Kyaw Bo, Tyron Bejay, Aung Min Khant and Aye Myat Thu, which aired on MRTV-4 in September 2018.

In April 2019, he won Rising Star Award (Male) in Star Awards where he also won Fashion Star Award (Male). On October 23, 2020, the Korean Embassy in Myanmar made an official announcement about him regarding the appointment of an honorary ambassador to promote Korean culture.

== Political activities ==
Following the 2021 Myanmar coup d'état, Khar Ra was active in the anti-coup movement both in person at rallies and through social media. Denouncing the military coup, he has taken part in protests since February. He joined the "We Want Justice" three-finger salute movement. The movement was launched on social media, and many celebrities have joined the movement.

On 5 April 2021, warrants for his arrest were issued under section 505 (a) of the Myanmar Penal Code by the State Administration Council for speaking out against the military coup. Along with several other celebrities, he was charged with calling for participation in the Civil Disobedience Movement (CDM) and damaging the state's ability to govern, with supporting the Committee Representing Pyidaungsu Hluttaw, and with generally inciting the people to disturb the peace and stability of the nation.

== Filmography ==
=== Film (Cinema) ===
- Dimensions (မျက်နှာပြင်များ) (2018)
- Toxic Man (အဆိပ်ရှိလူရိုင်း) (2018)
- City Hunters (မြို့ပြမုဆိုးများ) (2019)
- Lady Danger (2020)
- Marry Me (TBA)
- Yangon Mafia (TBA)
- Secret Page (TBA)

=== Film ===
- The Accident (တိုက်ဆိုင်မှု) (2017)
- Bella and Me (ဘယ်လာနှင့်ကျွန်တော်) (2017)
- Unstoppable (တားဆီးမရနိုင်သော) (2017)

=== Television series ===
- It was on Yesterday 2 (မနေ့ကဖြစ်သည် ၂) (2018)
- Spirit of Fight (လောကကြိုးဝိုင်း) (2019)
- Lake Pyar (လိပ်ပြာ) (2019)
- 74 Days of Love (ရင်ခုန်သံ၇၄ရက်) (2020)
- Love Square (ချစ်ခြင်းစတုဂံ) (TBA)

== Discography ==
=== Solo albums ===
- Ka Lane Ka Kyait (Deceit) (ကလိမ်ကကျစ်) (2016)
