= Min Phone Myat =

Burmese actor

- မင်းဘုန်းမြတ်
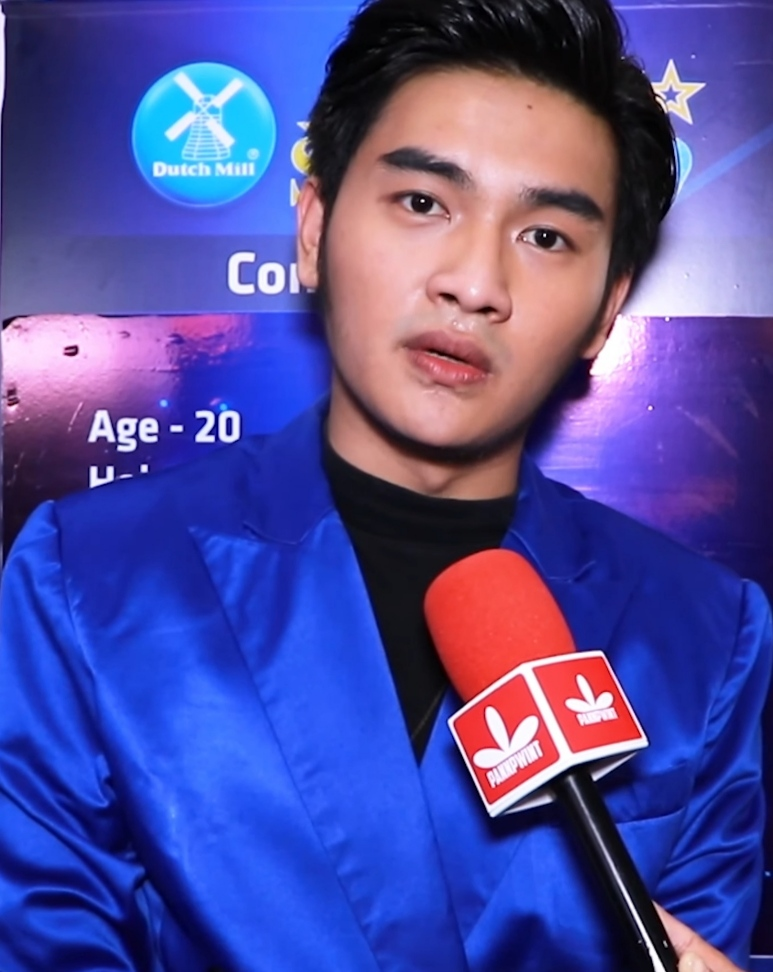
- Min Phone Myat in 2020
- Born: October 9, 1997 (age 28); Myanmar
- Occupations: Actor, singer

Min Phone Myat (Burmese: မင်းဘုန်းမြတ်; born 9 October 1997) is a Burmese television and film actor and singer. He gained popularity among the audiences after starring her role as Maung Phone in MRTV-4 television series Say Ta Lone Maung Phone (2021).

== Career ==
In 2018, he starred in his first MRTV-4 drama series It was on Yesterday 2 alongside Aung Min Khant, Khar Ra, Tyron Bejay, Kyaw Kyaw Bo, Aye Myat Thu, Hsu Pan Htwar and Than Thar Moe Theint.

In 2019, he took on his first big-screen role in The Three Men, She Loves where he played the main role with Yan Aung, Min Oo, Moht Moht Myint Aung, Eaindra Kyaw Zin and Emily Bo which premiered in Myanmar cinemas on 23 May 2020.

In 2020, he portrayed the male lead in the drama series Mar Yar Hlae Kwat, alongside Poe Kyar Phyu Khin, Aung Paing, Khant, Mya Hnin Yee Lwin and Thuta Aung. In the same year, he starred in dramatic television series with LGBT characters Evening Miracle alongside Htet Aung Shine, Htoo Thar and Htet Amara San.

In 2022, he gained increased attention and popularity with his role as Maung Phone in the horror series Say Ta Lone Maung Phone alongside Mone, Kyaw Htet, Khaing Thazin Ngu Wah, Yan Lin Aung, Khin Moht Moht Aye and A Lin Thit.

In 2026, his series called " Pyow O Yin" along side with Yan Aung and so many other actors.

== Filmography ==
=== Film (cinema) ===
- The Three Men, She Loves (2019)

Sar Rit Ta 1 Sar Rit Ta 2 Bout Char Pan Do ra

=== Television series ===
- It was on Yesterday 2 (2018)
- Toxic season 2 (2019)
- Mar Yar Hlae Kwat (2020)
- Evening Miracle (2020)
- Say Ta Lone Maung Phone (2021)
- Flower Trap (2023)
- Pyo O Yin(2024)
- Yin(2025)
- Sar Yar Yoke Kwin(2026)
