= Daung Yin Pyan Bon Nabay Mhar Sar Yay Loh Htar Chin Dal =

2022 Burmese television series

- Poster
- Burmese: ဒေါင်းယာဉ်ပျံဘုံနံဘေးမှာစာရေးလို့ထားချင်တယ်
- Genre: Drama
- Based on: Daung Yin Pyan Bon Nabay Mhar Sar Yay Loh Htar Chin Dal by Nwam Jar Thaing
- Screenplay by: Hein Zaw Oo; San San Yin
- Directed by: Zabyu Htun Thet Lwin
- Starring: Kyaw Htet Zaw; Nan Sandar Hla Htun; Su Htet Hlaing; Thar Htet Nyan Zaw; Nay Yee Win Lai; Sett Yoon Twel Tar
- Theme music composer: Myint Moe Aung
- Opening theme: "Daung Yin Pyan Mhar Yay Tae Sar" by Su Htet Hlaing and Lar Dint Htar Yi
- Ending theme: "Daung Yin Pyan Mhar Yay Tae Sar" by Su Htet Hlaing and Lar Dint Htar Yi
- Country of origin: Myanmar
- Original language: Burmese
- No. of episodes: 36

Production
- Executive producer: Khin Saing
- Editors: Hnin Nwe Win; Kyaw Swar Win; San Yati Htike
- Running time: 40 minutes Mondays to Fridays at 19:00 (MMT)
- Production company: Kyaung Kabar Production

Original release
- Network: MRTV-4
- Release: June 2 – July 21, 2022

Daung Yin Pyan Bon Nabay Mhar Sar Yay Loh Htar Chin Dal (Burmese: ဒေါင်းယာဉ်ပျံဘုံနံဘေးမှာစာရေးလို့ထားချင်တယ်) is a 2022 Burmese drama television series directed by Zabyu Htun Thet Lwin starring Kyaw Htet Zaw, Nan Sandar Hla Htun, Su Htet Hlaing, Thar Htet Nyan Zaw, Nay Yee Win Lai, Nan Shwe Yee and Sett Yoon Twel Tar. It is an adaptation of the popular novel "Daung Yin Pyan Bon Nabay Mhar Sar Yay Loh Htar Chin Dal" by Nwam Jar Thaing. It aired on MRTV-4, from June 2 to July 21, 2022, on Mondays to Fridays at 19:00 for 36 episodes.

== Synopsis ==
Thet Thet denied all the boys who were interested in her. Her refusal included Zaw Myo Khant, who was always by her side. Zaw Myo Khant was obsessed with her and started drinking. Thet Thet did not care for him at all. Zaw Myo Khan always yells at Thel Phyu, who has asthma. But Thel Phyu loves him and is humble. When Thet Thet met Naing Lin, who had a wife, she was pleased with his words. Thet Thet was sincerely friendly with Naing Lin, but she became reluctant as the environment falsely accused her. When Naing Lin's wife asked her to back off, she became even angrier and more reluctant. Naing Lin's wife, headmistress Daw Tin May Oo was very angry and she slapped Thet Thet on the cheek. Thet Thet was even angrier and she did not back down at all, but moved on. And she married Naing Lin. But Daw Tin May Oo did not divorce Naing Lin. Later she calmed down and lived in the same house with Naing Lin and Thet Thet. However, Naing Lin also had an affair with singer Mya Moe Thu. Thet Thet knew about it and killed both Naing Lin and Mya Moe Thu. Finally, Thet Thet repented and wrote a note.

== Cast ==
- Kyaw Htet Zaw as Naing Lin
- Nan Sandar Hla Htun as Thet Thet
- Su Htet Hlaing as Daw Tin May Oo
- Thar Htet Nyan Zaw as Zaw Myo Khant
- Nay Yee Win Lai as Thel Phyu
- Sett Yoon Twel Tar as Mya Moe Thu
- Phyo Eaindra Min as Nyein Hla
- Nan Shwe Yee as Khin Myint Swe
- Hnin Oo Wai as Thida Soe
- Min Thu as Kyi Maung
- Wah Wah Aung as Ma Theint
- Ei Si Kway as Kyaw Kyaw
- Sara Song Oo as Ma Mi
