= Kar Yan Lwae Myittar =

Burmese television series

- Poster
- Burmese: ကာရန်လွဲမေတ္တာ
- Genre: Drama
- Based on: Poisoned Mother by Nay Nwe Zin Myint
- Screenplay by: Aye Kyi Thar Han; Mae Min Bon; Nilar Shein (season 1); Kyaw Kyaw Htun (season 2)
- Directed by: Ko Ko Win
- Starring: May Myint Mo; Nat Khat; Ye Aung; Cho Pyone; Kaung Sett Naing; Zu Zu Zan; Great Chan; Kaung Myat; Su Yadanar Htike
- Ending theme: "Myaw Lint Thaw Bawa" by Thar Dee Lu (season 1)
- Composers: Thar Dee Lu (season 1); Aung Htet(season 1); Za Wah (season 2); Nay Wah (season 2)
- Country of origin: Myanmar
- Original language: Burmese
- No. of seasons: 2
- No. of episodes: 64 (32+32)

Production
- Producer: Khun Mai Aung
- Production location: Myanmar
- Cinematography: Bo Bo Aung (season 1); Wai Min Thant
- Editors: Wai Yin Mon (season 1); Soe Soe Zaw (season 1); Shoon Lae Yee Oo (season 2); Yamin Oo (season 2)
- Running time: 50 minutes
- Production company: Niyyayana Entertainment

Original release
- Network: MRTV-4
- Release: 9 May 2023 – 20 February 2024

Kar Yan Lwae Myittar (Burmese: ကာရန်လွဲမေတ္တာ) is a Burmese drama television series directed by Ko Ko Win starring May Myint Mo, Nat Khat, Ye Aung, Cho Pyone, Kaung Sett Naing, Zu Zu Zan, Great Chan, Kaung Myat, Su Yadanar Htike, Yamone Myint Myat, Moe Thura, Nay Lin Shein, Min Oo and May Than Nu. It is an adaptation of the novel "Poisoned Mother" by Nay Nwe Zin Myint. It was produced by Niyyayana Entertainment and edited by Wai Yin Mon, Soe Soe Zaw, Shoon Lae Yee Oo and Yamin Oo.

Its season 1 aired on MRTV-4, from May 9 to June 21, 2023, on Mondays to Fridays at 19:00 (MMT). Its season 2 aired from January 8, to February 20, 2024.

== Synopsis ==
=== Season 1 ===
Her mother and father died shortly after Nay Nyo Yee was born. Nay Nyo Yee was left with her grandfather. When Nay Nyo Yee was about ten years old, she was taken to Yangon to be a maid. But Daw Mya Thet, the old woman in the house she went to, loved her like a daughter, and Daw Mya Thet's daughter also loved her as a little sister. Then, Daw Mya became her foster mother. When Nay Nyo Yee came of age, her sister got married and went to and stayed at her husband's house, she took her too. In that house, Nay Nyo Yee had to live as a maid. One day, the owner of that house, U Kyaw Win abused her. Nay Nyo Yee returned to Daw Mya Thet because U Kyaw Win's daughter, Theingi Win pressured her. Later, Nay Nyo Yee got a job at a small restaurant. Later, she married Tin Myo Oo, who used to eat at the small restaurant. Then, they had a daughter. Later, Tin Myo Oo found out about her past events and they broke up. As for Nay Nyo Yee, she had to see her daughter quietly. Tin Myo Myint also couldn't forgive Nay Nyo Yee's incident. Tin Myo Myint had drunk too much alcohol and died. Later, Nay Nyo Yee worked harder for her daughter.

== Cast ==
- May Myint Mo as Nay Nyo Yee
- Yamone Myint Myat as Ingyin (season 2)
- Moe Thura as Thurain (season 2)
- Nay Lin Shein as Yan Naung (season 2)
- Ye Aung as U Kyaw Win
- Min Oo as U Min Lwin (season 2)
- Nat Khat as Tin Myo Myint (season 1)
- Kaung Sett Naing as Tin Myo Oo (season 1)
- Su Yadanar Htike as Ingyin (season 1)
- Zu Zu Zan as Theingi Win
- Great Chan as Khin Ma Ma Khine
- Hsu Htet Htet Kyaw as Kay Thi (season 1)
- Moe Ma Kha May as Ma Ma Cho (season 1)
- Cho Pyone as Daw Mya Thet
- May Than Nu as Daw Aye Aye Moe (season 2)
- Khin Moht Moht Aye as Daw Thein
- Than Than Soe as Daw Eain Thu
- Kaung Myat as Nyunt Tin
- Eaint Kyi Phyu as Ohn Mar Saw
- Kyaw Moe Paing as Maung Maung Win
- Min Thu as Aung Thike Htun
- Ae Wai Thar as Thuzar Thet
- Phyo Yazar Naing as Banyar Htun (season 2)
- Saw La Pyae Won as Mar Lar Win (season 2)
- Sharr as Khin Myo (season 2)
- Loon Chal as Khine Myo (season 2)
- Min Khant Nyi as Pyae Sone Win (season 2)
- May Myat Noe Thwe as Hlaing Hlaing Saw (season 2)
