= MRTV-4 =

Burmese television channel

- Country: Myanmar
- Broadcast area: Myanmar
- Headquarters: Yangon

Programming
- Language: Burmese
- Picture format: 1080i (16:9 HDTV)

Ownership
- Owner: Forever Group
- Sister channels: Channel 7; Reader's Channel; Maharbawdi; 4 EDU

History
- Launched: 15 May 2004; 22 years ago February 2014; 12 years ago (HD)

Links
- Website: Official website

Availability

Terrestrial
- Digital terrestrial television (Myanmar): Channel 3 (HD); RF Channel 27 522 MHz
- MRTV (Myanmar): Channel 11; RF Channel 31 554 MHz
- Thaicom 6 (Thailand): 3730 H 15000 (SD)
- Thaicom 6 KU (Thailand): 12728 V 30000 (SD)
- CANAL+ (Myanmar): Channel 35 (SD)
- Softtech M1 (Myanmar): Channel 19 (SD)
- GMM Z (Thailand): Channel 211 (SD)
- Infosat (Thailand): Channel 111 (SD)

Streaming media
- Pyone Play: Watch live

MRTV-4 (Myanmar Radio and Television- 4) is a Burmese television channel jointly operated by the state-owned MRTV and the private media company the Forever Group. Launched in May 2004, the channel broadcasts between 7 am and 11 pm. Since that time, it is only available to viewers with satellite or terrestrial DVB-T decoders. Now, they broadcast 24 hours and also available in OTT platform, PyonePlay.

The channel is run under the Ministry of Information, and international news broadcasts undergo censorship.

== History ==
In May 2004, MRTV-4 was broadcast a two hours a day program schedule with the cooperation of Myanmar Radio and Television under the Ministry of Information. In 2005, they were broadcast a six hours a day program schedule and broadcast free to air for Yangon and neighboring areas in 2006, for Mandalay and neighboring areas in 2007. In April 2009, MRTV-4 channel was broadcasting 18 hours a day. MRTV-4 became a 24-hours a day in September 2010. In February 2014, they introduced the High-definition channel in 4TV network.

== Programming ==
=== TV Shows ===
Year	English name	Original Name (Burmese)
2012-2021	Khit Thit Pyo May	ခေတ်သစ်ပျိုမေ
Since 2014	Myanmar's Got Talent	
Since 2015	Mingalarbar	မင်္ဂလာပါ
Since 2017	Galaxy Star	
Since 2018	The Voice Myanmar	
Since 2018	MasterChef Myanmar	
Roonmate		
Since 2019	Dancing with the Stars Myanmar	
Since 2023	Who wants to be a millionaire?	
Since 2023	Khin Pyo Madi	ခင်ပျိုမဒီ
Since 2023	Health Fix	
Since 2023	Fittest On Earth "FOE"	
Since 2024	Don't Forget the Lyrics Myanmar	စာသားမမေ့ကြေး

== International & Local Series ==
=== Korean Drama Series ===
Year	English name	Original Name (Burmese)
2018	Enemies from the Past	လမင်းတစ်ရာ
2018	Bad Thief, Good Thief	လူကောင်းလူဆိုး
2018	Judge vs. Judge	နှလုံးသားစီရင်ထုံး
2018	It's My Life	ကျွန်တော့်ဘဝအကြောင်း
2019	My Healing Love	စကားပြောတဲ့သံယောဇဉ်
2019	Memoir of Colors	ဒိုင်ယာရီအလင်းတန်း
2019	Rich Family's Son	သူဌေးသားလေးကျွန်မချစ်သူ
2020	Different Dreams	မတူညီသောအိပ်မက်များ
2020	I'm Sorry, But I Love You	စိတ်မကောင်းပေမယ့်ချစ်တယ်
2020	Gracious Revenge	သံသရာအဆုံးထိ
2020	Forest	တောအုပ်ထဲကအပန်းဖြေစခန်း
2020	Bad Love	ခပ်ဆိုးဆိုးအချစ်
2020	Fatal Promise	အယောင်ဆောင်ချစ်ခြင်း
2020	Jang Ok-jung, Living by Love	နန်းထိုက်သည့်တော်ဝင်ပန်းတစ်ပွင့်
2020	Priest	ယုံကြည်ရန်ခက်ခဲသော
2020	Moonlight Drawn by Clouds	လရောင်လွှမ်းတဲ့အချစ်
2021	The Fugitive of Joseon	ဂျိုဆွန်းပြည်မှသမားတော်
2021	Man in a Veil	ဖုံးကွယ်ထားသောသူ
2021	Want a Taste?	လိုချင်သောအရသာ
2021	Endless Love	ထာဝရချစ်သူ
2021	To Fortune	ကံကြမ္မာစေရာသို့
2021	Red Shoes	ဖိနပ်အနီလေး
2022	Different Dreams	အိပ်မက်ကမ္ဘာငယ်လေး
2022	Dream of the Emperor	‌ကြီးမြတ်သောချစ်ကြည်ရေး
2022	Dong Yi	ဆန်းကြယ်သောကံကြမ္မာ
2022	Young Lady and Gentleman	မိန်းမပျိုလေးရဲ့ရင်ခုန်သံ
2022	The Veil	အရိပ်ပမာ
2023	Spring Turns to Spring	‌နွေဦးသို့တဖန်
2023	Rain or Shine	‌နှစ်ဦးသားရဲ့ဘဝ
2023	Penthouse	မဆုံးသောအိပ်မက် (အတွဲ-၁၊၂၊၃)
2023	Graceful Friends	သူငယ်ချင်းဆိုတာ
2023	The Secret House	လျှို့ဝှက်သောအိမ်
2023	The Good Detective	ဒီမှုခင်းရဲ့စုံထောက်ခရီး (အတွဲ-၁၊၂)
2023	Ghost Doctor	ဝိညာဉ်ဒေါက်တာ
2023	Love Twist	အချစ်မုန့်ကြိုးလိမ်
2023	Rose Mansion	နှင်းဆီအိမ်
2023	Golden Mask	‌ရွှေအိုရောင်မျက်နှာဖုံးရှင်
2023	Tunnel	‌မဟူရာလိုဏ်ဂူ
2024	The Witch's Game	လိပ်ပြာမာယာ
2024	The Missing	အတိတ်ခြေရာ
2024	Train	သံယောဇဉ်ရထား
2023	The King's Daughter, Soo Baek-hyang	‌ဘတ်ဂျယ်ပြည်ရဲ့မင်းသမီးလေး
2024	Flower of Evil	ပန်းတစ်ပွင့်ရဲ့အတိတ်
2024	Splendid Politics	တော်ဝင်မီးအိမ်ရှင်
2024	Six Flying Dragons	ဝေဟင်ထက်က နဂါးမာန်
2025	One the Woman	ပန်းပွင့်အက္ခရာ
2025	It's Beautiful Now	ရင်ခုန်သံတိုးတိုးလေး
2025	Mrs. Cop	လျှို့ဝှက်နက်နဲသော
2025	Yong-pal	မေတ္တာခွန်အား
2025	King Gwanggaeto the Great	နှလုံးသားဖြင့်လင်းတဲ့ကြယ်
2025	Woman in a Veil	လျှို့ဝှက်သံစဉ်
2025	The Elegant Empire	ရင်မှာပွင့်တဲ့မေတ္တာပန်း
2025	The Fiery Priest	ကျွန်တော် ဖာသာဖြစ်လာသောအခါ
2026	VIP	ပို၍လှသော

=== Television series ===
Year	English name	Original Name (Burmese)	Cast
2012	The Sign of Love	အချစ်သင်္ကေတ	Myat Thu Kyaw, Soe Nandar Kyaw, Wint Yamone Naing, Kaung Myat San, Phome Shein Khant, May Myint Mo, Pyae Phyo Aung
2012	The Sign of Love Season 2	အချစ်သင်္ကေတ အတွဲ ၂	Myat Thu Kyaw, Soe Nandar Kyaw, Hsaung Wutyee May, Wint Yamone Naing, Kaung Myat San, Phome Shein Khant, May Myint Mo, Pyae Phyo Aung
2013	The Sign of Love Season 3	အချစ်သင်္ကေတ အတွဲ ၃	Myat Thu Kyaw, Soe Nandar Kyaw, Hsaung Wutyee May, Wint Yamone Naing, Kaung Myat San, Phome Shein Khant, May Myint Mo, Pyae Phyo Aung
2013	Pan Nu Thway	ပန်းနုသွေး	Myat Thu Kyaw, May Myint Mo, May Mi Kyaw Kyaw, Sai Nay Phyo
2014	Forever Mandalay	ထာဝရမန္တလေး	Aung Min Khant, Chue Lay, Nat Khat, Aung Yay Chan
2014	Happy Beach Season 2		Kyi Zaw Htet, Kyaw Hsu, Min Tharke, Kyaw Htet, Thwin Min Khant, Wint Yamone Naing, Khay Sett Thwin, Mone, Thet Oo Ko, Myat Thu Thu, Zu Zu Zan, Chue Lay, May Myint Mo, Nat Khat
2015	Pan Nu Thway Season 2	ပန်းနုသွေး အတွဲ ၂	Myat Thu Kyaw, May Myint Mo, May Mi Kyaw Kyaw, Sai Nay Phyo, Chue Lay, Kyaw Hsu
2015	Wit Nyin Shite Than	ဝိညာဉ်ရှိုက်သံ	Aung Min Khant, Han Lin Thant, May Mi Kyaw Kyaw, Hsaung Wutyee May, Khin Sandar Myint
2015	Eain Nee Chin	အိမ်နီးချင်း	Kaung Myat San, Khay Sett Thwin, Moe Di, San San Win, Pwint, Wat Ma, Aye Aye Khine, Kyaw Htoo
2015	Flowers & Butterflies Season 2		Kyi Zaw Htet, Khay Sett Thwin, Nat Khat, Khin Sandar Myint, Kyaw Htet, Khine Thazin Oo, Sai Nay Phyo, Eaindray Wint Htal, Kyaw Hsu, Soe Nandar Kyaw, Myat Thu Thu, Zu Zu Zan
2015	Winkabar San Eain	ဝင်္ကပါစံအိမ်	Aung Min Khant, Poe Kyar Phyu Khin, Hsaung Wutyee May, Myat Thu Thu, Aung Yay Chan
2016	Myittar Athel Mywar	မေတ္တာအသည်းမြွာ	Nat Khat, Lin Myat, Thiri Soe Moe, Thar Htet Nyan Zaw, Great Chan, Htun Htun Win, Phoe Kyaw, Zin Myo, Khin Moht Moht Aye, Goon Pone Gyi
2016	Lu Yee Chun	လူရည်ချွန်	Myat Thu Kyaw, Kyaw Hsu, May Mi Kyaw Kyaw, Si Thu Win, Chue Lay, Su Waddy
2016	Ko Lu Pyo	ကိုလူပျို	Phone Sett Thwin, May Mi Ko Ko, May Akari Htoo, Shwe Sin Wint Shein, Kyaw Htoo, Pwint
2016	Better Tomorrow	ပို၍လှသောမနက်ဖြန်	Yan Aung, Nay Myo Aung, May Thinzar Oo, Aung Min Khant, Aung Yay Chan, Nat Khat, Chue Lay, Ju Jue Kay
2016	Ma Ma Htake and Heritage House	မမထိပ်နှင့်အမွှေစံအိမ်	Hein Htet, Khine Thin Kyi, Poe Kyar Phyu Khin, Mone, Su Waddy, May Akari Htoo
2017	Yadanar Htae Ka Yadanar	ရတနာထဲကရတနာ	Aung Min Khant, Myat Thu Thu, Kaung Myat San
2017	Chit Thu Htwin Tae Atkhayar	ချစ်သူထွင်းတဲ့အက္ခရာ	Kyaw Hsu, Wint Yamone Naing
2017	Sone See Chin Moe Tain Myar	ဆုံစည်းခြင်းမိုးတိမ်များ	Si Thu Win, May Myint Mo, Khay Sett Thwin
2017	Hubris	မာန်	Zin Wine, Ye Aung, Han Lin Thant, Hsaung Wutyee May, May Mi Ko Ko, Lin Myat, La Pyae, Thuta Aung
2017	A Mone Mha The	အမုန်းမှသည်	Kyaw Htet Zaw, Hsaung Wutyee May, Kaung Myat San, May Akari Htoo
2017	It was on Yesterday	မနေ့ကဖြစ်သည်	Thu Riya, A Linn Yaung, Yoon Yoon, Aye Myat Thu
2017	Magical Village	ပဉ္စလက်ရွာ	Aung Min Khant, Nan Sandar Hla Htun, Chue Lay, Thu Riya
2017	Oo Yin Mhu Phit Phu Chin The	ဥယျာဉ်မှူးဖြစ်ဖူးချင်သည်	Kyaw Hsu, Khay Sett Thwin, Poe Kyar Phyu Khin, Hein Htet
2018	9	သူငယ်ချင်းကိုးယောက်	Thar Htet Nyan Zaw, Saw Min Yar, Hsu Waddy, Great Chan, Phyo Than Thar Cho, Wai Yan Kyaw, La Pyae, Phone Sett Thwin, Hsu Sandi Yoon, Nay Yee
2018	Shwe Kyar Phoo Thit	ရွှေကြာဖူးသစ်	Mone, Yan Aung, Zu Zu Zan, Ye Aung, Lin Myat, Thi Ha, Shinn Myat
2018	Nway Kandar Oo	နွေကန္တာဦး	Sithu Win, Phyu Thant Chaw
2018	Pyaw Shwin Chin Wit Nyin	ပျော်ရွှင်ခြင်းဝိညာဉ်	Kyaw Hsu, Wint Yamone Naing, Thi Ha, Thun Thitsar Zaw, Shwe Sin Wint Shein
2018	A Yake	အရိပ်	Nat Khat, May Myint Mo, Hein Htet, Nan Sandar Hla Htun, Khay Sett Thwin
2018	Yatha Mawkun Alinkar	ရသမော်ကွန်းအလင်္ကာ	Aung Yay Chan, Chue Lay, Shinn Myat, Ye Aung, May Thinzar Oo
2018	Bagan Myo Thu	ပုဂံမြို့သူ	Daung, May Myint Mo
2018	Kyain Sar Pyal Dan Dar Yee	ကျိန်စာပြယ်ဒဏ္ဍာရီ	Shin Mwe La, May Sue Maung, Khant, Ye Aung, Soe Myat Thuzar, Khine Hnin Wai, Lin Myat, Hsu Htet Hlaing, Shin Min Set, Hein Yatu, Phyo Yazar Naing, Htet Myat
2018	It was on Yesterday 2	မနေ့ကဖြစ်သည် ၂	Aung Min Khant, Khar Ra, Tyron Bejay, Aye Myat Thu, Su Pan Htwar
2018	Closest to the Heart	နှလုံးသားနှင့်အနီးဆုံး	Kaung Myat San, Nan Sandar Hla Htun
2018	Pyar Yay Aine	ပျားရည်အိုင်	Aung Yay Chan, May Mi Ko Ko, Myat Thu Thu
2018	Moe Kaung Kin Eain Met	မိုးကောင်းကင်အိပ်မက်	Kyaw Htet Zaw, Si Thu Win, Poe Kyar Phyu Khin
2018	Shwe Phoo Sar Sone Yar Myay	ရွှေဖူးစာဆုံရာမြေ	Kyaw Hsu, Chue Lay
2019	Thermometer	သာမိုမီတာ	Phone Sett Thwin, Khay Sett Thwin, So Pyay Myint, Ayeyar, Kin Kaung
2019	Sate Ei Chay Yar	စိတ်၏ခြေရာ	Kyaw Htet Zaw, Wint Yamone Naing
2019	I'm Mahaythi	ကျွန်မကမဟေသီ	Aung Yay Chan, Wint Yamone Naing, Than Thar Moe Theint
2019	Winkabar Shin Tan	ဝင်္ကပါရှင်းတမ်း	Nat Khat, Si Thu Win, Nan Sandar Hla Htun
2019	Where There is Love	ချစ်ခြင်းတရားတို့ရှိရာ	Kaung Myat San, Hsaung Wutyee May
2019	Lay Sone Twal	လေးစုံတွဲ	Phone Sett Thwin, Khay Sett Thwin, Aung Lwin, Ayeyar, So Pyay Myint, Khant, Chit Su, Pwint
2019	Myetlone Mhar Alwan Nhotekhan Mhar Marna	မျက်လုံးမှာအလွမ်းနှုတ်ခမ်းမှာမာန	Aung Min Khant, Nay Chi Shoon Lak
2019	A Lin Htae Ka Lu	အလင်းထဲကလူ	Si Phyo, Mone
2019	Chit Ya Par Thaw Nway	ချစ်ရပါသောနွေ	Nat Khat, Chue Lay
2019	Kyal Kalay Yae Kaung Kin	ကြယ်ကလေးရဲ့ကောင်းကင်	Kyaw Htet Zaw, Poe Kyar Phyu Khin
2019	The Seven Banknotes	ငွေစက္ကူခုနှစ်ရွက်	Hein Htet, Nan Sandar Hla Htun, Mya Hnin Yee Lwin, Thi Ha
2019	Tatiya Myaut Sone Mat	တတိယမြောက်ဆုံမှတ်	Hein Htet, Myat Thu Thu, May Mi Ko Ko, Shin Mwe La
2019	Rose	နှင်းဆီ	Si Thu Win, Khay Sett Thwin
2019	The Missing Truth	ပျောက်ဆုံးနေသောအမှန်တရား	Kaung Myat San, May Myint Mo, Lu Min, Naw Phaw Eh Htar
2019	Room No.?	အခန်းနံပါတ်?	Kyaw Hsu, Nay Chi Shoon Lak, Wint Yamone Naing, Mya Hnin Yee Lwin
2019	Nat A Lo Jo A Ma	နတ်အလိုဂျိုအမ	Hein Yatu, Hsaung Wutyee May
2019	Nway Lal Nya Yae La Min	နွေလယ်ညရဲ့လမင်း	Phome Shein Khant, Chue Lay, Than Thar Nyi
2019	Leik Pyar Hnaung Kyo	လိပ်ပြာနှောင်ကြိုး	Hein Htet, Mone, May Mi Ko Ko
2019	A Kyin Nar Myit Phyar	အကြင်နာမြစ်ဖြား	Moe Yan Zun, Khin Wint Wah, Htoo Aung, Htet Htet Htun
2020	Kyee Myat Thaw Martar	ကြီးမြတ်သောမာတာ	Ye Aung, Moht Moht Myint Aung, Aye Chan Maung, Nan Shwe Yi, Kaung Sett Htoo, Soe Moe Kyi, Khin Thazin, Ei Shoon Madi Moe
2020	Kyun Taw A Mone Sone Kyun Taw	ကျွန်တော်အမုန်းဆုံးကျွန်တော်	Nat Khat, Nan Sandar Hla Htun, Nay Yee Win Lae
2020	Sue Pann Khwai Thwe Bayet Hnint Pay Ywat Leik Nahtaung Sin	ဆူးပန်းခွေသွယ်ဘယက်နှင့်ပေရွက်လိပ်နားတောင်းဆင်	Khant Si Thu, Aung Yay Chan, Khine Thin Kyi
2020	Legends of Warriors	တစစ်တမက်ကိုယ်နှင့်သက်ကို	Khant Si Thu, Soe Myat Thuzar, Aung Yay Chan, May Myint Mo, Kyaw Hsu
2020	A Chit Phwae Lay Nyin	အချစ်ဖွဲ့လေညင်း	Kyaw Htet Zaw, Than Thar Moe Theint, Khant Thiri Zaw
2020	G Hall Thu	ဂျီဟောသူ	Hein Htet, May Mi Ko Ko
2020	Toh Ma Ma Nae Toh	တို့မမနဲ့တို့	Hein Min Thu, Myat Thu Thu, Moe Thura, So Pyay Myint, Shin Min Set
2020	Mar Yar Hlae Kwat	မာယာလှည့်ကွက်	Min Phone Myat, Poe Kyar Phyu Khin, Aung Paing, Khant, Thuta Aung
2020	Ma Mhe Wae Nae Kin Aung Nay	မမှီဝဲနဲ့ကင်းအောင်နေ	Thar Htet Nyan Zaw, Wai Lar Ri, Nay Myo Aung, Htoo Khant Kyaw
2021	Mhaw Palin	မှော်ပလ္လင်	Han Htoo Zen, Myat Thu Thu
2021	Tu Hnine Ma Ya Tae Myittar	တုနှိုင်းမရတဲ့မေတ္တာ	Yan Aung, Min Thu, Nay Dway, Sit Naing, Aye Chan Maung, Ei Si Kway, Min Khant Nyi, Kaung Sett Htoo, Khine Hnin Wai, Poe Ei Ei Khant, Nan Shwe Yi, Khin Thazin, Saung Yoon San, Hnin Oo Wai, Ei Shoon Madi Moe, Soe Moe Kyi
2021	Say Ta Lone Maung Phone	စေတလုံးမောင်ဘုန်း	Min Phone Myat, Mone, Kyaw Htet, Khaing Thazin Ngu Wah, Yan Lin Aung, Su Lin Shein, A Lin Thit
2022	Ma Kyay Si	မကြေးစည်	Nat Khat, May Mi Ko Ko, Hein Yatu, Lin Myat, Thura Maung Cho, Khoon Nay Chi Cho, Shin Min Sett, Sharr, Su Sandi Yoon, Hsu Waddy
2022	Su Taung	ဆုတောင်း	Wai Yan Lin, Phome Shein Khant, So Pyay Myint, Kaung Sit Thway, Min Zay, La Pyae, Phyo Yazar Naing, Saw Min Yar, Hsaung Wutyee May, Han Na Lar, Zu Zu Zan, Nant Chit Nadi Zaw, Hsu Sandi Yoon, Moe Ma Kha May, Sharr, Eaint Kyi Phyu, La Won Thit
2022	Tharaphu	သရဖူ	Kyaw Hsu, Kaung Sett Naing, Chue Lay, Than Thar Nyi, Aung Paing, Moe Thura, Moe Thiri Htet, Nay Yee Win Lai, Zin Wine, Soe Myat Thuzar
2022	U Phee Gyan's Small Shop	ဦးဖီးကြမ်းတို့ဆိုင်ကလေး	Phome Shein Khant, So Pyay Myint, Mone, Han Na Lar, Wai Yan Lin, Shin Min Thu, Nga Pyaw Kyaw, Godzilla, Hla Hla Win
2022	Daung Yin Pyan Bon Nabay Mhar Sar Yay Loh Htar Chin Dal	ဒေါင်းယာဉ်ပျံဘုံနံဘေးမှာစာရေးလို့ထားချင်တယ်	Kyaw Htet Zaw, Nan Sandar Hla Htun, Su Htet Hlaing, Thar Htet Nyan Zaw, Nay Yee Win Lae, Nan Shwe Yee, Sett Yoon Twel Tar
2022	Aye Yake Nyein	အေးရိပ်ငြိမ်	Myat Thu Thu, Sett Yoon Twel Tar, Yan Lin Aung, Kyaw Htet, Thet Oo Ko, Sett Yan Naing, Jue San Thar, Ingyin Htoo, Cho Pyone, Kaung Myat, Hein Zay, Moe La Yaung, Thaw Phone Sett
2022	Ywar Lal Tae Phoo Sar	ရွာလည်တဲ့ဖူးစာ	Kaung Myat San, May Myint Mo, Wai Yan Lin, Shin Min Sett, Khun Seng, Han Na Lar
2022	Wi Par Ka	ဝိပါက	Thu Ta Aung, Mayn Hein, Ingyin Htoo, Khun Nay Chi Cho, Htoo Khant Kyaw, Kyaw Zaw Hein, Zaw Win Naing
2022	101% Love	၁၀၁% အချစ်	Kaung Myat San, Hsaung Wutyee May, Yan Aung, Khin Zarchi Kyaw, Htoo Mon, Moe Thura, Kaung Htet Thar, Su Htet Hlaing, Su Mon, Moe Thadar
2022	Sayar Won Sit Sit Phyit Chin Tal	ဆရာဝန်စစ်စစ်ဖြစ်ချင်တယ်	Nayla, Thun Thitsar Zaw, Jue San Thar, Ayeyarza, Lunn Chel, Ngu War Khaing
2022	Kwat Lat Ma Shi	ကွက်လပ်မရှိ	Kyaw Htet Zaw, Poe Kyar Phyu Khin, Shin Mwe La, Nay Lin Shein, A Lin Thit, Wyne Shwe Yi, Khine Hnin Wai
2023	Mahuyar Pearl	မဟူရာပုလဲ	Aung Yay Chan, May Mi Ko Ko, Hnin, Hein Yatu, Natt Shine Ko, Jue San Thar, Saw La Pyae Won
2023	Cover Lover	မျက်နှာဖုံးချစ်သူ	Kyaw Hsu, Sett Yoon Twel Tar, Aung Paing, Hsu Htet Htet Kyaw, Wai Yan Lin, Eaint Chit Chit, Nyein Chan, Pan Su, May Yati Khant, May Myat Noe Thwe, Win Shwe Yi Thin
2023	Thitsar	သစ္စာ	Kyaw Hsu, Myat Thu Thu, Yan Lin Aung, Natt Shine Ko, Moe Ma Kha May, Shin Min Sett
2023	Kar Yan Lwae Myittar	ကာရန်လွဲမေတ္တာ	Nat Khat, May Myint Mo, Ye Aung, Kaung Sett Naing, Zu Zu Zan, Great Chan, Cho Pyone, Khin Moht Moht Aye, Than Than Soe, Su Yadanar Htike
2023	Colorful Town	ရောင်စုံခြယ်မြို့ကလေး	Hein Yatu, Moe Thura, Htoo Pyae Aung, Khoon Nay Chi Cho, Thansin Seaser, Shwe Kain Na Yee, Oak Aw Than Thar Cho
2023	White Year	အဖြူရောင်သက္ကရာဇ်	Phome Shein Khant, Aung Myint Myat, Phyo Than Thar Cho, Htet Htet Oo Maung, Kaday Phone Thaw, Natt Shine Ko, Mike Mike, Wai Yan Htet, Htoo, Thuta Sone, Su Yoon, Eaint Kyi Phyu, Mori Wyne, May Po Po Chit
2023	Poisonous Love	အဆိပ်လိုအချစ်	Thar Htet Nyan Zaw, Kaung Zan Hein, Hsaung Wutyee May, Khant, Great Chan, Khun Seng, Kaung Htet Thar, Min Myat Thuka, Min Khant Ko, Zar Zan Han Thar, Hsu Latt, Htoo Wunna Shein, Yan Aung, Ye Aung, May Than Nu, Hla Myo Thinzar Nwe, Nan Shwe Yee, Shwe Khay Oo
2023	Flower Trap	ပန်းထောင်ချောက်	Shin Mwe La, Min Phone Myat, Mayn Hein, Thuta Aung, Hla Pyae, Saw Min Yar, Zun Wai Yan, Thet Oo Ko, Lucas, Wai Lyan Aung, Myat Kay Thi Aung, Honey Su San, Khaing Thazin Ngu Wah, May Myat Noe Thwe
2023	The Beloved	ချစ်လှစွာသော	Zin Wyne, Moht Moht Myint Aung, Sithu Win, Wint Yamone Naing, May Sue Maung
2023	Yay Nathar Khin Khin Gyi	ရေနံ့သာခင်ခင်ကြီး	Ye Aung, Khant Si Thu, Han Htoo Zen, Soe Myat Thuzar, Soe Myat Nandar, Wai Lar Ri
2024	Kar Yan Lwae Myittar Season 2	ကာရန်လွဲမေတ္တာ အတွဲ ၂	May Myint Mo, Moe Thura, Nay Lin Shein, Yamoan Myint Myat, Sharr, Great Chan, Lunn Chel, Phyo Yazar Naing, Saw La Pyae Won
2024	Once Upon a Time at the university	တစ်ခါတုန်းကတက္ကသိုလ်မှာ	Sithu Win, Wint Yamone Naing, Kaung Zan Hein, Thansin Seaser
2024	Poe	ပိုး	Han Htoo Zen, Phyo Yazar Naing, Aye Myat Noe San, Mabel, Lunn Chel, May Thinzar Oo
2024	Mal Cho	မယ်ချို	Min Phone Myat, Wyne Shwe Yi, Thun Thitsar Zaw, Mayn Hein
2025	Kyin Phaw	ကြင်ဖော်	Soe Pyae Thazin, Naw Phaw Eh Htar, Wai Lar Ri, Nat Khat, Nay Lin Shein, Nay Htut, May Panchi, Hmue Htake Htar, Hsu Myat Noe Zin, Sai Si Tom Kham
2025	Happy Hotel	ပျော်ရွှင်စရာဟိုတယ်	Zar Zan Han Thar, Thun Thitsar Zaw, Mabel, Moe Tain, Kan Pwint, Myittar Myint Myat Hein, So Pyay Myint, Htet Myat Aung, Buu Thee, That Let, Super Lin
2025	River of Hatred	အမုန်းမြစ်	Wint Yamone Naing, Charlie, Myat Kaythi Aung, Su Htet Hlaing, Thein Lin Soe, Nae Thit Aye Aung, May Thin Ko, Min Khant Ko, Paing Oak Soe Aung, Hnin Ei Wint Wah, Zaw Oo, Zin Myo, Daung Wai
2025	Biography of Beloved	အချစ်ဆုံးသူရဲ့အတ္ထုပ္ပတ္တိ	Kaung Myat San, Mone, Su Htet Hlaing
2025	Yay Sat Toh The Lal Ta Khar Ta Yan Ma Sone See Thar	ရေစက်တို့သည်လည်းတစ်ခါတစ်ရံမဆုံစည်းသာ	Nay Toe, Aye Myat Thu, Naw Phaw Eh Htar, Thu Htoo San
2025	Undoubted Love	သံသယကင်းတဲ့အချစ်	Aung Paing, Khaing Thazin Ngu Wah, Moe Thura, Nyi Nanda, Nay Ni Nway Htwe, Lucas, Nyein Chan, Thet Oo Ko
2025	The Mist Forever	မြူနှင်းတို့ထာဝရဝေ	Shin Mwe La, Yamoan Myint Myat, Phome Shein Khant, Ye Aung, Great Chan, Thansin Seaser
2025	Toe Toe Lay Chit Mal	တိုးတိုးလေးချစ်မယ်	Paing Takhon, Amera Hpone, Nyi Nanda, Ye Lwin Oo, Sithu Ye Htut, Aung Bhone Htut, Li Li Kyaw Khine, Khin Thaw Thar San, Nan Mo Kam
2025	Golden Lotus In The Wave	လှိုင်းလေကြားကပန်းရွှေကြာ	Kaung Myat San, Myat Thu Thu, Kaung Sett Naing, Phone Min Nayla, August Moe
2025	Maunt Mya Darli	မောင့်မြဒါလီ	Khant Si Thu, Thuta Aung, Kaung Sit Thway, Hein Zaw Htet, Soe Myat Thuzar, Nay Yee Win Lae, May Thet Kyaw, Sharr, May Myat Noe Thwe, Wah Wah Aung, Theingi Myint
2026	Yin Nint A Mya	ရင်နှင့်အမျှ	Aung Ye Htike, Tai Shwin, Nyi Nanda, Phone Min Nayla
2026	Beyond The Hate	အမုန်းရဲ့အလွန်	Kyaw Htet Zaw, Nan Sandar Hla Htun, Khaing Thazin Ngu Wah, Hsu Htet Htet Kyaw, Sai Kaung Min Htet, Hein Yatu, Mike Mike, Thet Htet
2026	The Pwot Eain	သပွတ်အိမ်	Khant Si Thu, So Pyay Myint, Nay Yee Win Lae, Su Lin Shein, Haymar Man Win, Shein Wana Aung
2026	Lo Taya	လိုတရ	Shin Mwe La, Thiri Kyaw, Shwe Kain Na Yi, Kyaw Htoo, Iris Lay Pyae Oo, Moe Myint Myat Soe, Pyae Phyo San, Angel Kyi Phyu, Shin Phone Nwe, Domino, Pyone Cho
2026	Myittar Lay Nyin Thin Say Thar	မေတ္တာလေညင်းသင်းစေသား	Kyaw Htet Zaw, Chaw Yadanar, Yamoan Myint Myat, Phone Min Nayla, Thin Khakthu, War War Aung, Saw La Pyae Won, Nay Won, Hmue Thiha Thu, Htet Htet Lin Lett
2026	Let Twel Phaw	လက်တွဲဖော်	Shein Tin Htoo, Yadanar Bo
2026	The Mirages	တံလျှပ်များ	Thar Htet Nyan Zaw, Wyne Shwe Yi, Hsu Pan Htwar, Thansin Seaser, Wai Yan Kyaw, Kyaw Moe Paing, A Lin Thit
2026	Ma Joe Ko Bal Lo Pyaw Ya Pa	မဂျိုးကိုဘယ်လိုပြောရပါ့	Thazin Nwe Win, Htoo Aung, Nyi Htut Khaung
2026	Mha Ta Par A Char Ma Shi Pee	မှတစ်ပါး အခြားမရှိပြီ	Kyaw Hsu, Nat Khat, Khin Zarchi Kyaw, Kay, Khon Seng, Khine Zin Thwe, Su Yadanar Htike

== See also ==
- Media of Burma
- Communications in Burma
- MRTV
- MITV
- Channel 7
