= Ma Mhe Wae Nae Kin Aung Nay =

Burmese television series

- Official poster
- Burmese: မမှီဝဲနဲ့ကင်းအောင်နေ
- Genre: Drama
- Screenplay by: Nyi Aung Nyi; Mal Khaing
- Story by: Maung Nge Yin Thway
- Directed by: Hein Soe
- Starring: Thar Htet Nyan Zaw; Wai Lar Ri; Nay Myo Aung; Htoo Khant Kyaw
- Theme music composer: Hinthada Myint Ngwe; Nyi Nyi Thwin
- Country of origin: Myanmar
- Original language: Burmese
- No. of episodes: 41

Production
- Executive producer: Khin Lay
- Producers: Naing Than; Maung Thi
- Production location: Myanmar
- Editor: Yu Yu Lwin
- Running time: 40 minutes Mondays to Fridays at 19:00 (MMT)

Original release
- Network: MRTV-4
- Release: 16 November 2020 – 11 January 2021

Ma Mhe Wae Nae Kin Aung Nay (Burmese: မမှီဝဲနဲ့ကင်းအောင်နေ) is a Burmese drama television series. It aired on MRTV-4, from 16 November 2020 to 11 January 2021, on Mondays to Fridays at 19:00 for 41 episodes.

== Cast ==
- Thar Htet Nyan Zaw as Dite
- Nay Myo Aung as U Phay Khin
- Htoo Khant Kyaw as U Baydar
- Wai Lar Ri as Saung
- Nyi Nyi Min Htet as Thet Oo
- Thuta Aung as Kywet
- Kaung Sit Thway as Zaw Ye
- Khun Nay Chi Cho as Kay Thi
- Min Thu as U Kyaw Soe
- Aye Thida as Daw Hnin Khine
- Wai Lu as U Htun Thet
- Mo Khan as Daw Wai Mar
