= Say Ta Lone Maung Phone =

Burmese television series

- Poster
- Burmese: စေတလုံးမောင်ဘုန်း
- Genre: Horror
- Screenplay by: Than Htike (Shwe Yake)
- Story by: Than Htike (Shwe Yake)
- Directed by: Than Htike (Shwe Yake)
- Starring: Min Phone Myat; Mone; Kyaw Htet; Khaing Thazin Ngu Wah; Yan Lin Aung; Su Lin Shein; A Lin Thit
- Country of origin: Myanmar
- Original language: Burmese
- No. of episodes: 24

Production
- Executive producer: Khin Lay
- Producers: Naing Than; Pyone Maung
- Cinematography: Aung Kyaw Thet (Lu Pyaw)
- Editors: Zin Min Phyo; Paing Soe Thu
- Running time: 40 minutes Mondays to Fridays at 19:00 (MMT)
- Production company: Forever Group

Original release
- Network: MRTV-4
- Release: December 30, 2021 – February 1, 2022

Say Ta Lone Maung Phone (Burmese: စေတလုံးမောင်ဘုန်း, romanized: Satong Maung Bong) is a Burmese horror television series. It was rated as PG-13. It aired on MRTV-4, from December 30, 2021 to February 1, 2022, on Mondays to Fridays at 19:00 for 24 episodes.

== Cast ==
- Min Phone Myat as Maung Phone
- Mone as Sakar Wah
- Kyaw Htet as Sein Thaung
- Khaing Thazin Ngu Wah as Nwe Wah
- Yan Lin Aung as Mar Ga
- Su Lin Shein as Khattar
- Khin Moht Moht Aye as Daw Tin Aye
- Hein Yatu as Aye Htun
- Nay Yee Win Lai as Ma Wai
- A Lin Thit as Min Sein
