= Han Htoo Zen =

Burmese television actor and musician

Han Htoo Zen ဟန်ထူးဈာန်
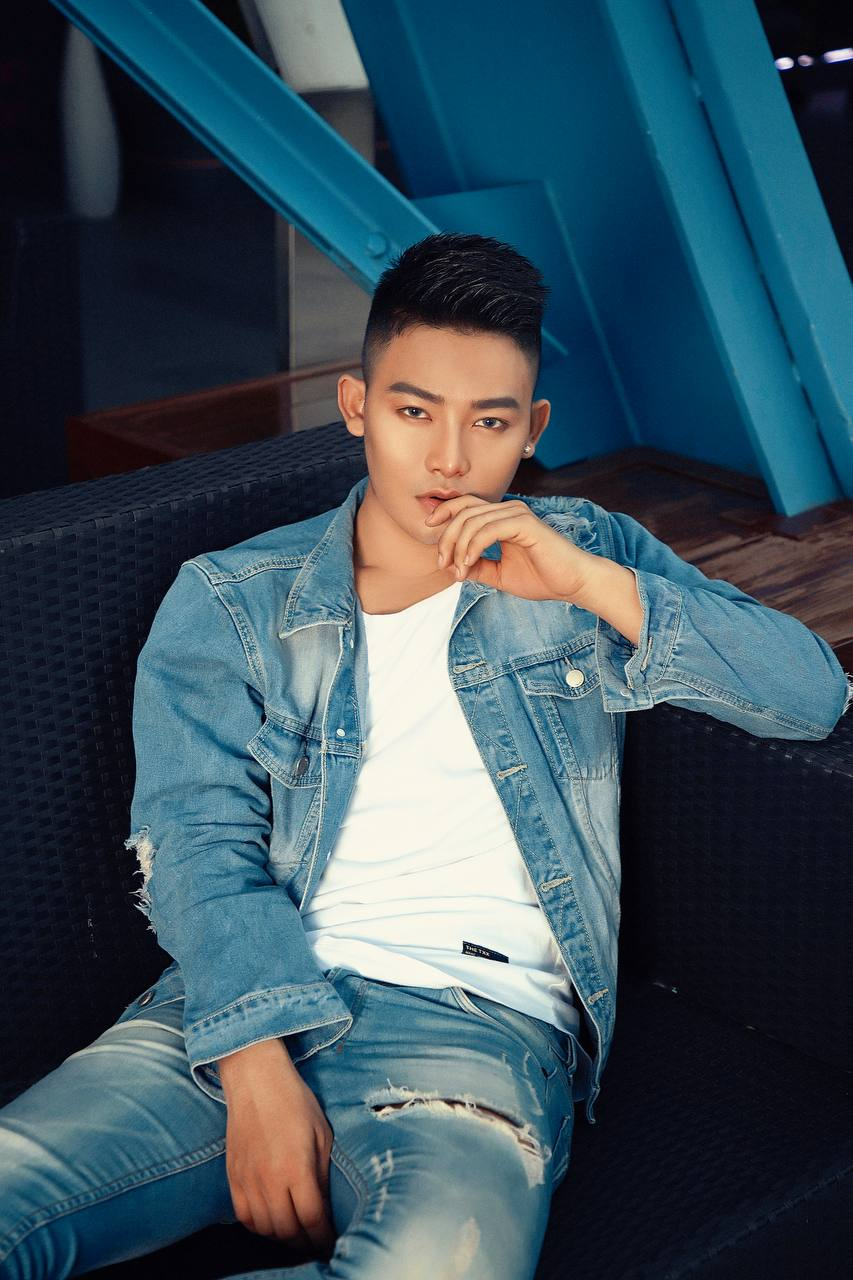
- Han Htoo Zen in 2020

Background information
- Born: Kaung Khant Zaw; 29 July 1993 (age 32); Pyay, Myanmar
- Genres: pop music
- Occupations: Musician, actor
- Years active: 2012–present

Han Htoo Zen (Burmese: ဟန်ထူးဈာန်; born Kaung Khant Zaw 29 July 1993) is a Burmese television actor and singer. He is best known for his roles in several MRTV-4 series and become popular among the audience with his song "Lain Lain Mar Mar Nay Par Kalay Yal" and the series Mhaw Palin (2021), Yay Nathar Khin Khin Gyi (2023).

== Early life and education ==
Han Htoo Zen (Burmese: ဟန်ထူးဈာန်; born Kaung Khant Zaw 29 July 1993) in Pyay, Myanmar to parents, Win Tin and Theingi Aung. He has one elder brother and one younger sister. He was attended his primary education at No.5 B.E.H.S Pyay and then he was graduated from Pyay University specializing in Geology.

== Career ==
In 2012, He joining a local singing contest, Eain Mat Sone Yar or Dream Meet season 4 and made it up to 3rd runner up and got People Popular Choice Award.He debuted in 2017 with the first pop music album Celebrity. He was became popular after released his single song "Lain Lain Mar Mar Nay Par Kalay Yal" and "Kabar Char Par Say" which song from "Celebrity" music album. After that he was gained great audience all over the country and became top singer of Myanmar. Miss Fabulous International 1st runner up Maeya Sun Sun was also casting with the "Celebrity" song's music video in 2018. In 2019, he debuted his second music album"Nann" which includes 12 songs. In 2019, he made his acting debut in the series "Thinn Kwel Ngte Doe Eain Apyan" (သင်းကွဲငှက်တို့အိမ်အပြန်).After that he acting debut in the MRTV 4 series, Mhaw Palin (မှော်ပလ္လင်) in 2020.He also sung song tracks in that TV series and another two series Ma Kyay Si(မကြေးစည်) and "Poe" (ပိုး). He released multiple single songs. This songs; "Lain Lain Mar Mar Nay Par Kalay Yal" "Mway Yat Myay Thoe ALwan" "Note Ma Sat Nae Ngo Chin Tal" and "Chit Loh" are popular among the youth. He performed many shows and festival due to his popularity. On 29 July 2024, he celebrated his 30th birthday show "My name is Han Htoo Zen" in Yangon, Myanmar.

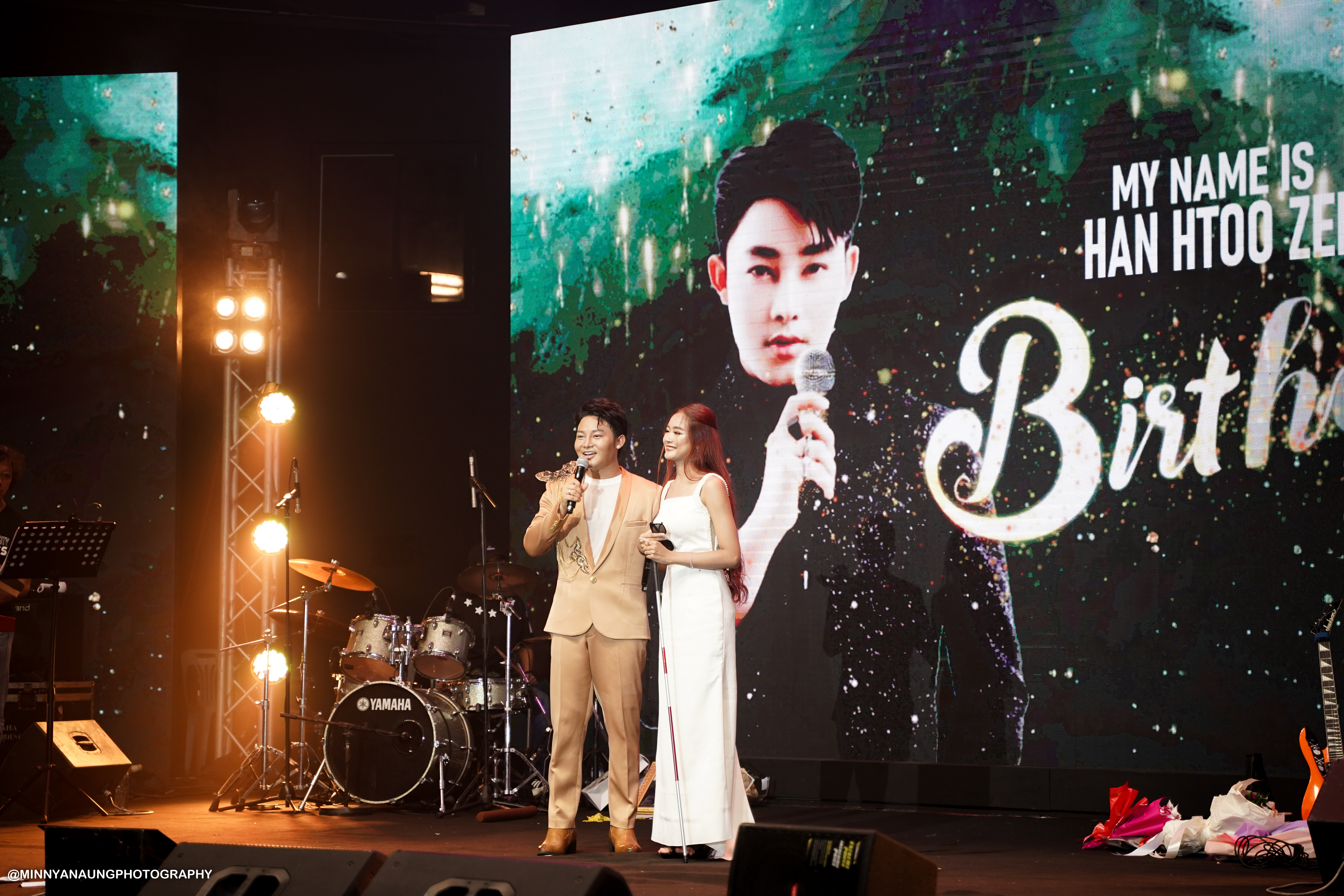
Han Htoo Birthday Show in 2024

About one thousand of his audience were joined this show and many famous artists May Kha Lar, Rebecca Win, Irene Zin Mar Myint and other artists were performed in this show. [[

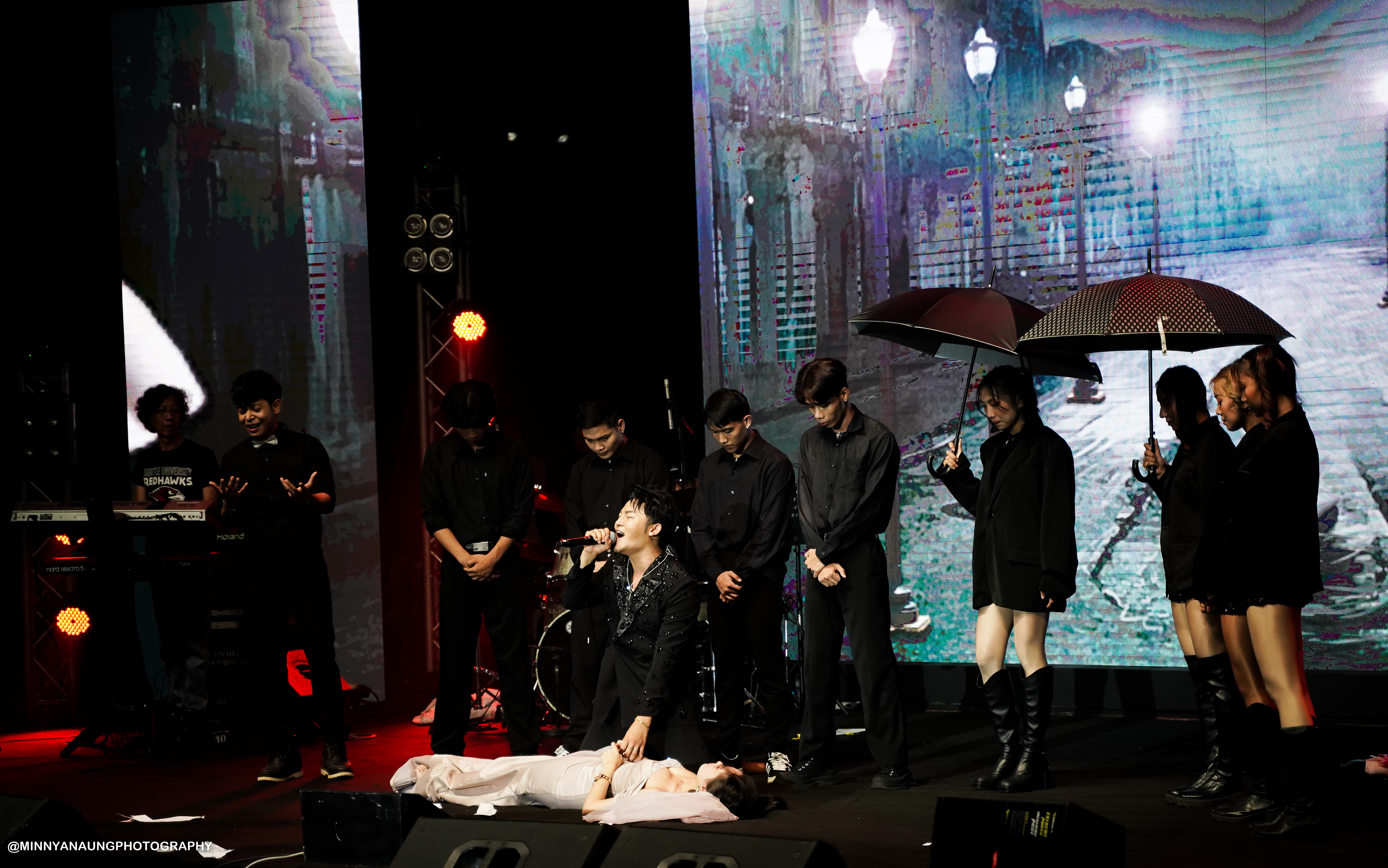

== Discography ==
=== Album ===
- Celebrity (2017)
- Nann (2019)

=== Single ===
- Pon Yate Hg
- Kyay Si
- Ko Lar Yin Kyo Mhar Lar
- Mone Khaine Tine Ma Mone Naing Bu
- Dar Nga Thingyan
- Sat Pak
- Padouk Nae Chit Thu
- Padouk Lat Saung
- Note Ma Sat Nae Ngo Chin Tal
- Plat Kyut Thingyan
- Phyat Lann Lay
- Mway Yat Myay Thoe ALwan
- Ngar Ngo Chin Tel
- Man Taung Yike Kho
- Twel Lat Myar
- Fa Lar Ta Kwat Myat Saung
- Chit Loh
- Kal Soh
- Sate
- Lain Lain Mar Mar Nay Par Kalay Yal
- Chit Tal Lwan Tal

== Filmography ==
=== Television series ===
Year	English title	Burmese title	Director	Co-stars	Network
2019	"Thinn Kwel Ngte Doe Eain Apyan"	" သင်းကွဲငှက်တို့အိမ်အပြန်"		Han Htoo Zen, Ju Jue Kay, Phyo Yarzar Naing	
2020	Mhaw Palin	မှော်ပလ္လင်	Aung Ba Power	Han Htoo Zen,Myat Thu Thu	MRTV 4
2023	"Yay Nathar Khin Khin Gyi	"ရေနံသာခင်ခင်ကြီး	Zaw Myint Oo	Ye Aung, Khant Si Thu, Han Htoo Zen, Soe Myat Thuzar, Soe Myat Nandar, Wai Lar Ri	MRTV 4
