= Mhaw Palin =

Burmese television series

- Poster
- Burmese: မှော်ပလ္လင်
- Genre: Horror; Drama
- Based on: Mhaw Palin by Ka Kyo Shin
- Screenplay by: Ka Kyo Shin
- Directed by: Aung Ba Power
- Starring: Han Htoo Zen; Myat Thu Thu; Zu Zu Zan; May Akari Htoo
- Theme music composer: Aung Ba Power
- Country of origin: Myanmar
- Original language: Burmese
- No. of episodes: 26

Production
- Executive producer: Khin Lay
- Producers: Naing Than; Maung Thi
- Production location: Myanmar
- Editor: Yoon Yoon San
- Running time: 40 minutes Mondays to Fridays at 19:00 (MMT)
- Production company: Myanmar Magic Media

Original release
- Network: MRTV-4
- Release: 27 January – 4 March 2021

Mhaw Palin (Burmese: မှော်ပလ္လင်) is a 2021 Burmese horror drama television series. It aired on MRTV-4, from January 27 to March 4, 2021, on Mondays to Fridays at 19:00 for 26 episodes.

== Cast ==
- Han Htoo Zen as Satkyar
- Myat Thu Thu as Sandara
- Zu Zu Zan as Pan Myat
- May Akari Htoo as Phyu Lay
- Kyaw Htet as Maung Min
- Kaung Myat as Nay Pyin
