= Sate Ei Chay Yar =

Burmese television series

- Burmese: စိတ်၏ခြေရာ
- Genre: Drama
- Directed by: Htet Naung Htun
- Starring: Kyaw Htet Zaw; Wint Yamone Naing
- Country of origin: Myanmar
- Original language: Burmese
- No. of episodes: 18

Production
- Executive producer: Khin Lay
- Producer: Hla Phyo
- Production location: Myanmar
- Running time: 40 minutes Mondays to Fridays at 19:00 (MMT)
- Production company: Forever Group

Original release
- Network: MRTV-4
- Release: 12 February – 7 March 2019

Sate Ei Chay Yar (Burmese: စိတ်၏ခြေရာ; lit. 'Footprint of Mind') is a 2019 Burmese psychological drama television series adaptation of a novel with the same name written by Ko Swe (Panorama). It aired on MRTV-4, from February 12 to March 7, 2019, on Mondays to Fridays at 19:00 for 18 episodes.

== Synopsis ==
A taxi driver is brought to a house by a mysterious passenger where he learns that a young woman who died five years ago may be connected to his previous life, and that her spirit seems to be attempting to remind him of something he has forgotten.

== Cast ==
- Kyaw Htet Zaw as
  - Myat Htun, Wai Lwin's previous life.
  - Wai Lwin, a taxi driver and Myat Htun's reincarnation who was born with strange birthmarks.
- Wint Yamone Naing as
  - Khin Kyawt May, Chaw Yupar's previous life.
  - Chaw Yupar, deceased daughter of [name unspecified] and Khin Kyawt May's reincarnation.
- Phone Shein Khant as Htun Thite, Myat Htun's best friend
- Wai Yan Kyaw as Yan Naing
- Han Na Lar as Sandi Myint
- Phu Sone as Chaw Yupar's mother
- Hein Yatu as Nay Thurein

== Production ==
=== Music ===
A full version of the series theme song 'Sate Ei Chay Yar' was recorded by Thar Dee Lu and released as promotional single by Legacy Music Network on May 13, 2019. An official music video was released on YouTube and Pyone Play.
