= May Myat Waso =

Burmese fashion designer (born 1984)

- မေမြတ်ဝါဆို
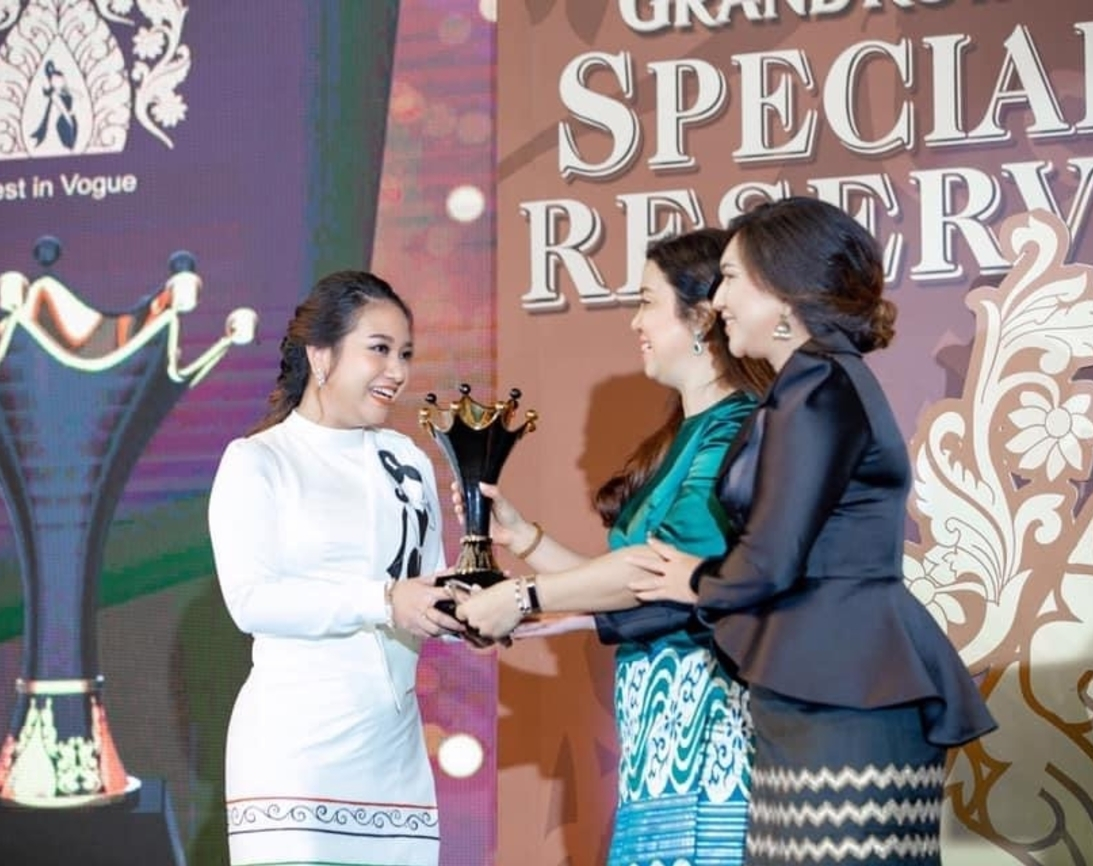
- May Myat Waso received the award at the 2019 Myanmar's Pride Awards
- Born: 12 July 1984 (age 42); Yangon, Myanmar
- Education: Dagon University
- Occupation: Fashion designer
- Years active: 2007–present
- Spouse: Min Min Bo
- Children: 1
- Parent: Nwam Jar Thaing (father)
- Awards: Myanmar's Pride Awards 2019 (Best in Vogue)

May Myat Waso (Burmese: မေမြတ်ဝါဆို) is a Burmese fashion designer. Her designs are based on Myanmar rincau (the wavy leaf pattern and motifs found on pagodas and temples), and include influences from other fashion traditions around the world. May Myat Waso won the Best in Vogue at the 2019 Myanmar's Pride Awards.

== Early life and education ==
May Myat Waso was born on 12 July 1984 in Yangon, Myanmar. She is the youngest daughter of Nwam Jar Thaing, a prominent Burmese writer. Her elder sisters Nay Chi Win Lae Yi, an art designer and Aung Se Sar, an architect. She attended high school at Practising School Yangon Institute of Education. She graduated from the Dagon University.

== Career ==
After her graduating, she founded Dressmaking & Fashion Design Training Center, Happy Heart, in 2007. She then opened another Brand & Design school with the same name. She also founded the Fashion Designers Entrepreneur Association in 2010 with eight other members, now nearly 100 members.

She showcased gold embroidery Myanmar traditional dresses in the BIFF & BIL International Fashion Fair, Bangkok in 2011 and at the Hong Kong Fashion Week 2016. She was selected to represent Myanmar at Indonesia Fashion Week 2017, 2018 and 2019. She displayed dresses made in the traditional Shwe Chi Hto-style, presented 12 of her Shwe Chi Hto outfits. She made headlines in Jakarta after exhibiting her masterpiece collection of Myanmar designs in 2017, showing off her designs of long flowing dresses and the characteristic Myanmar umbrella, winning her the adoration of the judges and the press. Her work was featured on the front page of the Jakarta Post for two days.

She also participated in the Women Costume and Dress Exhibition to honor Myanmar Women's Day for six times. A prolific creator, she was showcased in over 50 fashion shows both locally and internationally. She won the prestigious Designer Award organized by Shwe FM in 2018.

At the Indonesia Fashion Week 2018, she exhibited her collection alongside pictures of people from Myanmar. She has been nominated Fashion Award at the 2018 Myanmar's Pride Awards and won for first time in 2019.

== Personal life ==
On 14 February 2010, she married Min Min Bo. They have one daughter.
