= Kwat Lat Ma Shi =

Burmese television series

- Poster
- Burmese: ကွက်လပ်မရှိ
- Genre: Drama
- Based on: Ta Khu Lat Pay Mae Kwat Lat Ma Shi by Le Dwin Thar Saw Chit
- Screenplay by: Hein Zaw Oo; Aye Chan Mon; Yamin Phyo Wai
- Directed by: Pyi Thit Naing
- Starring: Kyaw Htet Zaw; Poe Kyar Phyu Khin; Shin Mwe La; Nay Lin Shein; A Lin Thit; Wyne Shwe Yi; Khine Hnin Wai
- Theme music composer: Za Wah
- Ending theme: "Kwat Lat Ma Shi" by Purity "Chit Mi Thwar Pyi Htin Tal" by Too Lay
- Country of origin: Myanmar
- Original language: Burmese
- No. of episodes: 31

Production
- Producer: Nyi Nyi Naing
- Production location: Myanmar
- Editor: Zin Min Phyo
- Running time: 40 minutes Mondays to Fridays at 19:00 (MMT)

Original release
- Network: MRTV-4
- Release: December 22, 2022 – February 2, 2023

Kwat Lat Ma Shi (Burmese: ကွက်လပ်မရှိ) is a Burmese drama television series. It is an adaptation of the novel "Ta Khu Lat Pay Mae Kwat Lat Ma Shi" by Le Dwin Thar Saw Chit. It aired on MRTV-4, from December 22, 2022, to February 2, 2023, on Mondays to Fridays at 19:00 for 31 episodes.

== Synopsis ==
As a result of her mothers wishes, Moe Moe Aye marries Nay Min Ta Yar. After the death of her mother, she moves in to her mother-in-law's house. Initially, Moe Moe Aye was comfortable and happy, but suffering soon became the norm at the hands of her mother-in-law. Her mother-in-law sold the house where she used to live with her deceased mother, and did not give her the proceeds after selling the house. Moe Moe Aye had to stop her mother-in-law from selling another house. She later becomes pregnant and her mother-in-law does not take care of her during the pregnancy. After she gave birth, her husband becomes a drug addict. The suffering and addiction became too much for her to bear. This drove her to ask for a divorce, taking her son, and eventually leaves her mother-in-law's house. She begins a new life, independently with her son. Moe Moe Aye then meets Ko Myat Htun, the owner of the company, who loved and cared for her son. Her son loved Ko Myat Htun, and she fell in love with him and they got married. They finally find happiness as a family.

== Cast ==
- Poe Kyar Phyu Khin as Moe Moe Aye
- Kyaw Htet Zaw as Ko Myat Htun
- Khine Hnin Wai as Daw Tin Tin Maw
- Shin Mwe La as Nay Min Ta Yar
- Nay Lin Shein as Ye Min Htet
- A Lin Thit as Sai Lu
- Wyne Shwe Yi as Tin Nwe Latt
- Phyo Khant (child cast) as Nyein Chan Aye
