= Mingalarbar =

Burmese television program

- Genre: Talk show
- Presented by: Htut Khaung Lin; Soe Htun Win; Hsu Mon
- Country of origin: Myanmar
- Original language: Burmese

Production
- Production location: Yangon
- Running time: 90 minutes Mondays to Fridays at 08:00 (MMT)

Original release
- Network: MRTV-4
- Release: 2013 – present

Mingalarbar (Burmese: မင်္ဂလာပါ) is a Burmese television morning show which airs on MRTV-4. The show has been airing since 2013.

== Broadcast format ==
Up to five sections from following are discussed per day. Host Choice, Hand Made, Health, Movie Review, Cooking (Every day), Art, Education, Technology, Beauty Tips, Work out, Talk with celebrities, Travelling guide, etc..
