= 9 (TV series) =

Burmese television series

- Poster
- Burmese: သူငယ်ချင်းကိုးယောက်
- Genre: Thriller; Drama; Slasher
- Screenplay by: Pyi Hein Thiha
- Story by: Pyi Hein Thiha
- Directed by: Pyi Hein Thiha
- Starring: Thar Htet Nyan Zaw; Saw Min Yar; Hsu Waddy; Great Chan; Phyo Than Thar Cho; La Pyae; Phone Sett Thwin; Hsu Sandi Yoon; Nay Yee
- Theme music composer: Soe Lin
- Country of origin: Myanmar
- Original language: Burmese
- No. of episodes: 18

Production
- Executive producer: Khin Lay
- Producers: Naing Than; Maung Thi; Phyo Sithu Kyaw
- Production location: Myanmar
- Editors: Hnin Thandar Myo; May Oo Myint; Zin Min Phyo
- Running time: 40 minutes Mondays to Fridays at 20:45 (MMT)
- Production company: Myanmar Magic Media

Original release
- Network: MRTV-4
- Release: January 22 – February 14, 2018

9 (Burmese: သူငယ်ချင်းကိုးယောက်) is a 2018 Burmese slasher television series. It aired on MRTV-4, from January 22 to February 14, 2018, on Mondays to Fridays at 19:00 for 18 episodes.

== Cast ==
- Thar Htet Nyan Zaw as Toe Tet
- Saw Min Yar as Arkar
- Hsu Waddy as Hay Man
- Great Chan as Nay Chi
- Phyo Than Thar Cho as Honey Cho
- La Pyae as Min Min Maung
- Wai Yan Kyaw as Ko Ko Aung
- Hsu Sandi Yoon as Wah Wah Myint
- Nay Yee as Yamone
- Phone Sett Thwin as Deputy Sheriff Aye Ko
