= Shinn Myat =

Burmese actor and model

- သျှင်းမြတ်
- Born: Shinn Thant Aung; 16 June 1998 (age 28); Yangon, Myanmar
- Education: Dagon University
- Occupations: Actor, model
- Years active: 2013–present
- Height: 177.8 cm (5 ft 10 in)
- Relatives: May Myint Mo (sister)

Shinn Myat (Burmese: သျှင်းမြတ်; born Shinn Thant Aung on 16 June 1998) is a Burmese television actor and model. He gained popularity after starring in the MRTV-4 television series Shwe Kyar Phoo Thit (2018) and Yatha Mawkun Alinkar (2018).

== Early life and education ==
Shinn Myat was born on 16 June 1998 in Yangon, Myanmar to parent Aung Ko and his wife Myintzu Htut. He has one older sibling May Myint Mo, an actress. He attended high school at Basic Education High School No. 1 Dagon and graduated from Dagon University with an LLB degree.

== Career ==
He entered the entertainment industry in 2013. He was selected the Academy Shwekyo, who tasked with holding the tray of the Academy statue at the Myanmar Academy Awards Ceremony that year. After that, he worked as a model and had been walked on commercial model shows.

In 2017, he was chosen from among almost 100 new talents for MRTV-4 series. He made his acting debut with a main role in drama Shwe Kyar Phoo Thit, alongside Yan Aung, Ye Aung, Lin Myat and Mone, aired on MRTV-4 on 15 February 2018. He then starred in his second series Yatha Mawkun Alinkar, where he played the main role with Ye Aung, Aung Yay Chan, Chue Lay and May Thinzar Oo, aired on MRTV-4 on 19 October 2018. His portrayal of the character Mawkun earned praised by fans for his acting performance and character interpretation, and experienced a resurgence of popularity.

Shin Myat made his big-screen debut with Nga Toh The where he played the main role with A Linn Yaung, Tyron Bejay, Khar Ra and Nay Ye. In 2020, he was cast in a main role in drama Eden Challenge, alongside Shin Mwe La, Nay Lin Shane and Hsaung Wutyee May.

== Filmography ==
=== Films (Cinema) ===
Year	Film	Burmese title	Note
2020	Nga Toh The	ငါတို့သည်	

=== Television series ===
Year	English title	Myanmar title	Role	Network	Notes
2018	Shwe Kyar Phoo Thit	ရွှေကြာဖူးသစ်	Mg Mg Latt	MRTV-4	
2018	Yatha Mawkun Alinkar	ရသ မော်ကွန်း အင်္လကာ	Mawkun	MRTV-4	
2022	101% Love	၁၀၁%အချစ်	Ko Lay	MRTV-4	
2022	Crying Forest	အိပ်မက်ငိုတော	Thet Paing	Canal+ ZAT LENN	
TBA	Eden Challenge			MRTV-4	
