= Moe Kaung Kin Eain Met =

Burmese television series

- Burmese: မိုးကောင်းကင်အိပ်မက်
- Genre: Drama
- Screenplay by: Kyaw Kyaw Htun; Kyaw Min Soe
- Directed by: Kitsada Imsomboon (Boy)
- Starring: Sithu Win; Kyaw Htet Zaw; Poe Kyar Phyu Khin
- Narrated by: Mue Thiha Thu
- Theme music composer: Myint Moe Aung
- Country of origin: Myanmar
- Original language: Burmese
- No. of episodes: 47

Production
- Executive producers: Brian L.Marcar; Khin Lay
- Producers: Naing Than; Nyi Nyi Naing
- Editors: Hnin Nway Oo Hlaing; Mhway Wutyi
- Running time: 40 minutes Mondays to Fridays at 19:00 (MMT)
- Production company: Forever Bec-Tero

Original release
- Network: MRTV-4
- Release: 13 July – 17 September 2018

Moe Kaung Kan Eain Met (Burmese: မိုးကောင်းကင်အိပ်မက်) is a 2018 Burmese drama television series. It aired on MRTV-4, from July 13, 2018, to September 17, 2018, on Mondays to Fridays at 19:00 for 47 episodes.

== Cast ==
=== Main ===
- Sithu Win as Ye Thway
- Kyaw Htet Zaw as Kar Yan Hein
- Poe Kyar Phyu Khin as Seng Mai
- Phone Sett Thwin as Jimmy
- Phyo Than Thar Cho as Gyan Pone
- Wai Yan Kyaw as Chit Htwe
- La Pyae as Ngwe Maung
- Hsu Sandi Yoon as Yamin
- Nay Yee Win as Sein Nu
- Htet Htet Moe Oo as Daw Mahuyar Khin
- Aye Myat Thu as Nay Chi Wint Htal
- Cho Pyone as A Phwar Pu

=== Supporting ===
- Nay Aung as U Nyein Chan Kyaw
- Aung Khaing as U Aung Htun
- Mike Mike as Naing Htun
- Lucas as Min Nay Aung
- War War Aung as Daw Toot
- Khin Moht Moht Aye as Daw Ngwe Khin
- Aye Thidar as Daw Thein Tin
- A Yine as U Pauk Si
- Daung Wai as U Agga
