= Kyaw Htet Zaw =

Burmese actor

- ကျော်ထက်ဇော်
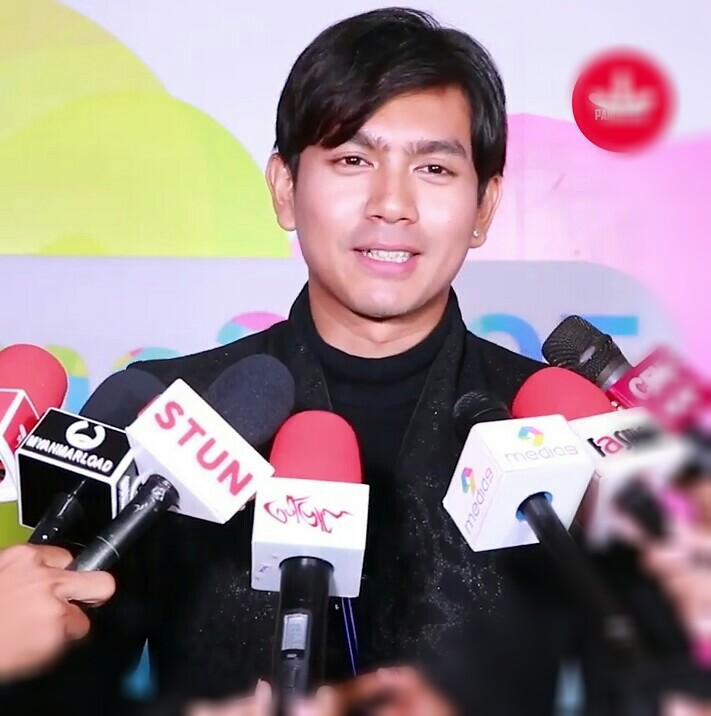
- Born: Kyaw Htet Aung; September 6, 1993 (age 32); Yangon, Myanmar
- Other name: Kyaw Htet Aung
- Education: Technological University, Thanlyin
- Occupations: Actor, model
- Years active: 2017–present

Kyaw Htet Zaw (Burmese: ကျော်ထက်ဇော်; born Kyaw Htet Aung on 6 September 1993) is a Burmese television actor. He is best known for his roles in television series A Mone Mha The (2017), Moe Kaung Kin Eain Met (2018), Sate Ei Chay Yar (2019), Kyal Kalay Yae Kaung Kin (2019), A Chit Phwae Lay Nyin (2020), Daung Yin Pyan Bon Nabay Mhar Sar Yay Loh Htar Chin Dal (2022), Kwat Lat Ma Shi (2022).

== Early life and education ==
Kyaw Htet Zaw was born on September 6, 1993, in Yangon, Myanmar. He graduated with a degree B.E in Electrical Power from Technological University, Thanlyin.

== Career ==
In 2017 he starred in his debut MRTV-4 drama series A Mone Mha The alongside Kaung Myat San, Hsaung Wutyee May and May Akari Htoo.

In 2018 he starred in drama series Moe Kaung Kin Eain Met alongside Si Thu Win, Poe Kyar Phyu Khin, Aye Myat Thu and Htet Htet Moe Oo. In the same year, he starred in drama series Sate Ei Chay Yar alongside Wint Yamone Naing and Phone Shein Khant.

In 2019 he starred in drama series Kyal Kalay Yae Kaung Kin alongside Khant Si Thu and Poe Kyar Phyu Khin. In 2020, he starred the main role of two character Yaung Ni Oo and Moe Thauk Oo, in the drama series A Chit Phwae Lay Nyin alongside Than Thar Moe Theint and Khant Thiri Zaw.

In 2022 he starred in drama series Daung Yin Pyan Bon Nabay Mhar Sar Yay Loh Htar Chin Dal alongside Nan Sandar Hla Htun, Su Htet Hlaing, Sett Yoon Twel Tar. In the same year, he starred in drama series Kwat Lat Ma Shi alongside Poe Kyar Phyu Khin, Shin Mway La.

He also acted in film Shwe Moe Ngwe Moe Pyae Shann Phyo, Thel Thel Lote and A Sate in 2020.

== Filmography ==
=== Film (Cinema) ===
- Shwe Moe Ngwe Moe Pyae Shann Phyo (ရွှေမိုးငွေမိုးပြည့်လျှံဖြိုး)
- Thel Thel Lote (သဲသဲလှုပ်) (2023)
- A Sate (အဆိပ်) (2025)
- King
- Mahn (မာန်) (2025)
- Lann Thaye (လမ်းသရဲ) (2026)

=== Television series ===
- A Mone Mha The (အမုန်းမှသည်) (2017)
- Moe Kaung Kin Eain Met (မိုးကောင်းကင်အိပ်မက်) (2018)
- Sate Ei Chay Yar (စိတ်၏ခြေရာ) (2019)
- Kyal Kalay Yae Kaung Kin (ကြယ်ကလေးရဲ့ကောင်းကင်) (2019)
- A Chit Phwae Lay Nyin (အချစ်ဖွဲ့လေညင်း) (2020)
- Daung Yin Pyan Bon Nabay Mhar Sar Yay Loh Htar Chin Dal (ဒေါင်းယာဉ်ပျံဘုံနံဘေးမှာစာရေးလို့ထားချင်တယ်) (2022)
- Kwat Lat Ma Shi (ကွက်လပ်မရှိ) (2022)
- Beyond The Hate (အမုန်းရဲ့အလွန်) (2026)
- Doo Tu Paung Phat (ဒိုးတူပေါင်ဖက်) (2026)
- Myittar Lay Nyin Thin Say Thar (မေတ္တာလေညင်းသင်းစေသား) (2026)
