= Than Thar Moe Theint =

Burmese actress and model

- သံသာမိုးသိမ့်
- Born: March 7, 1995 (age 31); Yangon, Myanmar
- Other name: T T Lay
- Education: Dagon University
- Occupations: Actress, model
- Years active: 2014–present
- Awards: Best Costume Award (Oramin F High School Queen 2014)

Than Thar Moe Theint (Burmese: သံသာမိုးသိမ့်; born 7 March 1995) is a Burmese television and film actress. She is known for her roles in television series It was on Yesterday 2 (2018), I'm Mahaythi (2019) and A Chit Phwae Lay Nyin (2020).

== Early life and education ==
Than Thar Moe Theint was born on March 7, 1995, in Yangon, Myanmar. She attended at Basic Education High School No. 1 Dagon. She graduated from Dagon University.

== Career ==
She started her career from attending Star & Model In't in 2014. Then she won Best Costume Award in Oramin F High School Queen 2014 and performing as Academy Shwe Kyo (the person tasked with holding the tray of the Academy statue or Academy prize information paper at the Myanmar Academy Awards Ceremony) alongside Paing Takhon in Myanmar Motion Picture Academy Awards Ceremony 2013.

In 2018, she starred in her debut MRTV-4 crime-action series It was on Yesterday 2 as the character Pan Thu alongside Aung Min Khant, Khar Ra, Tyron Bejay, Aye Myat Thu and Su Pan Htwar. In 2019, she starred in drama series Kya Ma Ka Mahaythi as the character Main Ma Chaw alongside Aung Yay Chan and Wint Yamone Naing. In 2020, she starred in drama series A Chit Phwae Lay Nyin as the character May Pyo Phyu alongside Kyaw Htet Zaw and Khant Thiri Zaw.

== Political activities ==
Following the 2021 Myanmar coup d'état, Than Thar Moe Theint was active in the anti-coup movement both in person at rallies and through social media. On 5 April 2021, warrants for her arrest were issued under section 505 (a) of the Myanmar Penal Code by the State Administration Council for speaking out against the military coup. Along with several other celebrities, she was charged with calling for participation in the Civil Disobedience Movement (CDM) and damaging the state's ability to govern, with supporting the Committee Representing Pyidaungsu Hluttaw, and with generally inciting the people to disturb the peace and stability of the nation.

== Filmography ==
=== Film (Cinema) ===
- Lay Par Kyawt Shein Warazain (2019)

=== Television series ===
- It was on Yesterday 2 (2018)
- I'm Mahaythi (2019)
- A Chit Phwae Lay Nyin (2020)
- Kyaw Zaw Maw Zaw (2023)
