= A Chit Phwae Lay Nyin =

Burmese television series

- Official poster
- Burmese: အချစ်ဖွဲ့လေညင်း
- Genre: Romance; Drama
- Based on: Lom Son Ruk
- Screenplay by: Aye Sandar Win; San San Yin; Kyaw Yazar Ko
- Directed by: Phuriwat Anusri
- Starring: Kyaw Htet Zaw; Than Thar Moe Theint; Khant; Nyi Htut Khaung; Khin Thazin; Mike Mike; Yan Kyaw; Theingi Htun
- Theme music composer: Myint Moe Aung (မြင့်မိုးအောင်)
- Opening theme: Yae Yae Lay (ယဲ့ယဲ့လေး)
- Ending theme: Yae Yae Lay (ယဲ့ယဲ့လေး)
- Country of origin: Myanmar
- Original language: Burmese
- No. of episodes: 45

Production
- Executive producers: Mr.Brian L.Marcar; Khin Lay
- Producers: Naing Than; Nyi Nyi Naing
- Production location: Myanmar
- Editors: Paing Soe Thu; Wint Phyo Maw
- Running time: 40 minutes Mondays to Fridays at 19:00 (MMT)
- Production company: Forever Bec-Tero

Original release
- Network: MRTV-4
- Release: 15 April – 16 June 2020

A Chit Phwae Lay Nyin (Burmese: အချစ်ဖွဲ့လေညင်း) is a 2020 Burmese romantic-drama television series starring Kyaw Htet Zaw, Than Thar Moe Theint, Khant, Nyi Htut Khaung, Khin Thazin, Mike Mike, Yan Kyaw and Theingi Htun. Kyaw Htet Zaw acted two characters for twin brothers. It aired on MRTV-4, from April 15 to June 16, 2020, on Mondays to Fridays at 19:00 for 45 episodes.

== Synopsis ==
When a young businessman Moe Thauk Oo falls into coma and struggle to regain memory due to traumatic brain injury, his younger twin brother Yaung Ni Oo, a district hospital assistant from Pindaya, is forced to impersonate in the place his brother as per his father and childhood friend's request to continue the company's affairs and uncover the motive behind attempted assassination that causes his brother to be hospitalized.

== Cast ==
=== Main ===
- Kyaw Htet Zaw in dual role as
  - Yaung Ni Oo, younger brother of identical twins. He is a philanthropist, doctor and hospital assistant residing in Pindaya.
  - Moe Thauk Oo, older brother of identical twins. He is a successful businessman living in Yangon and next generation to uphold the legacy of his father's company.
- Than Thar Moe Theint as May Pyo Phyu, former employee at AKS Company who was framed for defrauding substantial sum of money.
- Khant as Shay Yay Sat, Moe Thauk Oo's secretary and the twins' old friend.

=== Supporting ===
- Nyi Htut Khaung as U Nyan Min Kyaw, jealous and insecure younger half-brother of U Tin Maung Oo who wish to take control of his brother's company.
- Khin Thazin as Moe Kalyar, chief financial officer of AKS Company and one of U Nyan Min Kyaw's henchman working to take down the company's managing director for their good.
- Mike Mike as Han Sit Thway, cunning ex-boyfriend of May Pyo Phyu who is secretly and skillfully sabotaging the company's success.
- Yan Kyaw as U Tin Maung Oo, the owner of AKS Company and father of Yaung Ni Oo and Moe Thauk Oo.
- Theingi Htun as Daw Chain Si, also called Dway Lay Chain, mother of May Pyo Phyu.
- Sharr as Ya Min, one of May Pyo Phyu's friend from Pindaya.
- Nan Eaindray as Ei May Phoo, one of May Pyo Phyu's friend from Pindaya. She is usually seen together with Ya Min.
- Zin Cho Khine Oo as Khine Zun, a doctor working alongside Yaung Ni Oo and May Pyo Phyu's friend.
- Goon Pone Gyi as Kyi Kyi Myint, a housekeeper working for U Tin Maung Oo.
