= Shwe Kyar Phoo Thit =

Burmese television series

- Poster
- Burmese: ရွှေကြာဖူးသစ်
- Genre: Drama
- Based on: Shwe Kyar Phoo Thit by Shwe Yay Htin Htin
- Directed by: Ko Pauk
- Starring: Mone; Yan Aung; Zu Zu Zan; Ye Aung; Lin Myat; Thi Ha
- Opening theme: Nyein Chan Chin Nay Yar
- Ending theme: Nyein Chan Chin Nay Yar
- Composer: Za Wah
- Country of origin: Myanmar
- Original language: Burmese
- No. of episodes: 34

Production
- Production location: Myanmar
- Running time: 40 minutes Mondays to Fridays at 19:00 (MMT)
- Production company: Niyyayana Production

Original release
- Network: MRTV-4
- Release: 15 February – 4 April 2018

Shwe Kyar Phoo Thit (Burmese: ရွှေကြာဖူးသစ်) is a 2018 Burmese drama television series. It aired on MRTV-4, from February 15 to April 4, 2018 on Monday to Friday at 19:00 for 34 episodes.

== Cast ==
- Mone as Shwe Kyar Phoo Thit
- Yan Aung as Aphoe
- Zu Zu Zan as Aphwar
- Ye Aung as U Pyae Shan
- Lin Myat as Ko Ko
- Thi Ha as Min Nyo
- Shinn Myat as Mg Mg Latt
- Aung Khaing as U Aung Naing
- Kaung Sit Thway as Tay Zar Lin
- Hazel Nyi Nyi Htun as Wadi
