= Kyal Kalay Yae Kaung Kin =

Burmese television series

- Poster
- Burmese: ကြယ်ကလေးရဲ့ကောင်းကင်
- Genre: Drama
- Screenplay by: Cho Myat Mon; Aye Chan Mon
- Directed by: Kritsada Imsomboon
- Starring: Kyaw Htet Zaw; Poe Kyar Phyu Khin; Khant Si Thu; May Kabyar; Nyein Su Wai (child cast)
- Theme music composer: Wai Gyi (ဝေကြီး)
- Opening theme: Ma Tway Phit Kya Pay Mae (မတွေ့ဖစ်ကြပေမယ့်)
- Ending theme: Ma Tway Phit Kya Pay Mae (မတွေ့ဖစ်ကြပေမယ့်)
- Country of origin: Myanmar
- Original language: Burmese
- No. of episodes: 22

Production
- Executive producers: Brian L.Maraca; Khin Lay
- Producers: Naing Than; Nyi Nyi Naing
- Production location: Myanmar
- Editors: Mhway Wutyi; Wint Phyo Maw
- Running time: 40 minutes Mondays to Fridays at 20:45 (MMT)
- Production company: Forever Bec-Tero

Original release
- Network: MRTV-4
- Release: 2 July – 29 July 2019

Kyal Kalay Yae Kaung Kin (Burmese: ကြယ်ကလေးရဲ့ကောင်းကင်, lit. 'The Sky of the Little Star') is a 2019 Burmese drama television series. It aired on MRTV-4, from July 2 to 29, 2019, on Monday to Friday at 20:45 for 22 episodes.

== Cast ==
=== Main ===
- Kyaw Htet Zaw as Min Tain Yan
- Poe Kyar Phyu Khin as Chit Pan Eain
- Khant Si Thu as Ti Kyi Khant
- May Kabyar as Phyu Phyu Aung
- Nyein Su Wai (child cast) as Pauk Si

=== Supporting ===
- Wai Yan Kyaw as Ar Luu
- May Sue Maung as Ka Kyo
- Phyo Eaindra Min as Phyo Phyo
- Soe Moe Kyi as A May Yu
- Zell Roland as Mr. George
