= Mar Yar Hlae Kwat =

Burmese television series

- Official Poster
- Burmese: မာယာလှည့်ကွက်
- Genre: Drama
- Screenplay by: Min Ko Htway; Paing Soe Thu Maung; Cho Wutyi Lwin; Nilar Shein
- Directed by: Htut Tint Htun; Nyi Nyi Aung
- Starring: Min Phone Myat; Poe Kyar Phyu Khin; Aung Paing; Khant; Mya Hnin Yee Lwin; Thuta Aung
- Opening theme: "Mar Yar Hlae Kwat Myar" by Po Po Heather
- Ending theme: "Mar Yar Hlae Kwat Myar" by Po Po Heather
- Composer: Za War (ဇဝါ)
- Country of origin: Myanmar
- Original language: Burmese
- No. of episodes: 30

Production
- Executive producer: Khin Lay
- Producers: Naing Than; Pyone Maung Lwin
- Production location: Myanmar
- Editor: Thazin Moe
- Running time: 40 minutes Mondays to Fridays at 19:00 (MMT)
- Production company: Forever Group

Original release
- Network: MRTV-4
- Release: 5 October – 13 November 2020

Mar Yar Hlae Kwat (Burmese: မာယာလှည့်ကွက်) is a 2020 Burmese drama television series. It aired on MRTV-4, from October 5 to November 13, 2020, on Mondays to Fridays at 19:00 for 30 episodes.

== Cast ==
- Min Phone Myat as Htoo Myat Paing
- Poe Kyar Phyu Khin as Annawar Mone
- Aung Paing as Nay Thar
- Khant as Amara
- Thuta Aung as Win Naing
- Kaung Htet Thar as Lin Sett Yan
- Su Lin Shein as Yati Paing (who is the killer of Myanmar Civilian's niece)
- Min Thu as U Moe Nyo
- Mya Hnin Yee Lwin as Daw Honey Cho
- May Kabyar as Daw Thet Thet Mar
- Min Oo as U Myat Paing
- Hla Myo Thinzar Nwe as Daw Tin Ma Ma
