= Yatha Mawkun Alinkar =

Burmese television series

- Poster
- Burmese: ရသမော်ကွန်းအလင်္ကာ
- Genre: Drama
- Screenplay by: Htin Kyaw (film director)
- Directed by: Htin Kyaw (film director)
- Starring: Aung Yay Chan; Chue Lay; Shinn Myat; Ye Aung; May Thinzar Oo
- Country of origin: Myanmar
- Original language: Burmese
- No. of episodes: 23

Production
- Executive producer: Khin Lay
- Producers: Naing Than; Hla Phyo
- Production location: Myanmar
- Cinematography: Alma Dela Peña
- Editors: Cho Cho Myint; Hsu Hsu Lwin
- Running time: 40 minutes Mondays to Fridays at 20:45 (MMT)
- Production company: Forever Group

Original release
- Network: MRTV-4
- Release: 19 October – 20 November 2018

Yatha Mawkun Alinkar (Burmese: ရသမော်ကွန်းအလင်္ကာ) is a 2018 Burmese drama television series. It aired on Burmese MRTV-4, from October 19 to November 20, 2018, on Mondays to Fridays at 20:45 for 23 episodes.

== Cast ==
- Aung Yay Chan as Yatha
- Shinn Myat as Mawkun
- Chue Lay as Alinkar
- Hazel Nyi Nyi Htun as Moe Tain Hlwar
- Ye Aung as U Kaung Myat
- May Thinzar Oo as Daw Htar Htar May
- Lu Mone as U Aung Gyi
- Zin Myo as Soe Myint
