= It was on Yesterday 2 =

Burmese television series

- Burmese: မနေ့ကဖြစ်သည် ၂
- Genre: Action-crime
- Directed by: The Khit Nay
- Starring: Aung Min Khant; Khar Ra; Tyron Bejay; Kyaw Kyaw Bo; Aye Myat Thu; Su Pan Htwar; Than Thar Moe Theint; Min Phone Myat
- Country of origin: Myanmar
- Original language: Burmese
- No. of episodes: 30

Production
- Producer: Taurus V Production
- Production location: Myanmar
- Running time: 40 minutes
- Production company: Taurus V Production

Original release
- Network: MRTV-4
- Release: 18 September – 29 October 2018

It was on Yesterday 2 (Burmese: မနေ့ကဖြစ်သည်၂) is a 2018 Burmese action-crime television series. It aired on MRTV-4, from September 18 to October 29, 2018, on Monday to Friday at 19:00 for 30 episodes.

== Cast ==
- Aung Min Khant as Thuta
- Khar Ra as Ye Naung
- Tyron Bejay as Khant Hte
- Kyaw Kyaw Bo as U Thiha
- Aye Myat Thu as Khat Khat Khaing
- Su Pan Htwar as Daw Thidar
- Than Thar Moe Theint as Pan Thu
- Min Phone Myat as Tharr Zaw
- Kaung Sett Naing as Kyaw Htin
- Thet Oo Ko as Shine

== See also ==
- It was on Yesterday
