= Kyamar Noon =

Burmese television series

- Poster
- Burmese: ကြမ္မာနွံ
- Genre: Drama
- Based on: Kyamar Noon by Kalyar (Arts / Science)
- Screenplay by: Zaw Myint Oo
- Directed by: Aung Aww Bar
- Starring: Min Oo; Yan Kyaw; Su Hlaing Hnin; May Thinzar Oo; Pho Thauk Kyar; Aung Khant Zaw; Mya Hnin Yee Lwin; Soe Nandar Kyaw; Aung Khine; Khin Moht Moht Aye
- Country of origin: Myanmar
- Original language: Burmese
- No. of episodes: 30

Production
- Executive producer: May Thu Phay
- Production location: Myanmar
- Editors: Kyaw Wunna; Phyo Wai
- Running time: 45 minutes
- Production company: Aung Pyi Entertainment

Original release
- Network: MRTV
- Release: 15 March – 6 June 2018

Kyamar Noon (Burmese: ကြမ္မာနွံ) is a 2018 Burmese drama television series. It aired on MRTV, from March 15, to June 6, 2018, on every Wednesday, Thursday and Friday at 19:15 for 30 episodes.

== Cast ==
- Min Oo as U Kyaw Swar
- Yan Kyaw as Dr. U Saw Pyae
- Su Hlaing Hnin as Daw Mya Hnin Phyu
- May Thinzar Oo as Dr. Daw Yadanar
- Pho Thauk Kyar as Pyae Phyo Wai
- Aung Khant Zaw as Ko Oo
- Mya Hnin Yee Lwin as Yu War
- Soe Nandar Kyaw as Pan Pwint Wai
- Aung Khine as U Thaung
- Khin Moht Moht Aye as Sayama Gyi Naw
- Zaw Zaw as Ko Chin
- Aung Moe as U San Hla Htun
