= A Mone Mha The =

Burmese television series

- Burmese: အမုန်းမှသည်
- Genre: Romance; Drama
- Screenplay by: Kyaw Kyaw Htun; San San Yin; Tin Myo Khine
- Directed by: Phuriwat Anusri
- Starring: Kyaw Htet Zaw; Hsaung Wutyee May; Kaung Myat San; May Akari Htoo
- Theme music composer: Myint Moe Aung (မြင့်မိုးအောင်)
- Country of origin: Myanmar
- Original language: Burmese
- No. of episodes: 37

Production
- Executive producers: Mr.Brian L.Marcar; Khin Lay
- Producers: Naing Than; Soe Thura
- Production location: Myanmar
- Editors: Hnin Nway Oo Hlaing; Honey Lin
- Running time: 40 minutes Mondays to Fridays at 19:15 (MMT)
- Production company: Forever Bec-Tero

Original release
- Network: MRTV-4
- Release: 20 October – 11 December 2017

A Mone Mha The (Burmese: အမုန်းမှသည်; lit. 'From Hatred') is a 2017 Burmese romantic-drama television series. It aired on MRTV-4, from October 20 to December 11, 2017, on Mondays to Fridays at 19:15 for 37 episodes.

== Synopsis ==
Rich people. Gambling. Endless parties. Dangerous secrets. In a community of millionaires, money rules everything, except the heart. When Nay Cho Thway becomes an unlikely target of an influential man, her father entrusts her safety to Sai Nay Yaung as his last hope. Now, committed to the signature he signed, Sai Nay Yaung must protect Nay Cho Thway from a ruthless person she believes is generous all while enduring their underlying animosity. He claims that the most dangerous people are those who are closest to you. So, who can she trust? As rivalries intensify and secrets threaten to surface, protection turns into connection, connection turns into friendship, and friendship turns into something much deeper.

== Cast ==
=== Main ===
- Kyaw Htet Zaw as Sai Nay Yaung, the son of U Sai Min Shein and Daw Nan Kyay Hmone, Nan Yati's older brother and Koe's long-time best friend. He is a young entrepreneur and the boss of Thuriya Alinn Company.
- Hsaung Wutyee May as Nay Cho Thway, an only daughter of U Phone Nyan and a good friend of Koe. She recently returns to Yangon after many years of living abroad and is unfamiliar of her new surrounding.
- Kaung Myat San as Koe, a rich kid, rebel, son of U Banyar Koe and Daw Darli Tin San, and best friend of Sai Nay Yaung. Being raised under a dysfunctional family with toxic and negligent parents, he is impulsive and often tends to prioritize his desire for fun over responsibility.
- May Akari Htoo as Nan Yati, U Sai Min Shein and Daw Nan Kyay Hmone's sweet and innocent daughter, and Sai Nay Yaung's younger sister.

=== Supporting ===
- Min Oo as U Banyar Koe, self-centered and emotionally abusive father of Koe and Daw Darli Tin San's husband. He is an owner of a bank.
- May Kabyar as Daw Darli Tin San, Koe's mother and U Banyar Koe's wife. Despite her prideful attitude, she still loves and cares for her son's wellbeing.
- Min Khant Ko as Han Chan, an employee working at Sai Nay Yaung's company who has a crush on Amy Zaw.
- Thun Thitsar Zaw as Amy Zaw, Daw Si Si Zaw's submissive daughter.
- Khin Thaw Tar San as Pyo Madi, Sai Nay Yaung's arranged fiancée. With mutual understanding, she is a good friend to him regardless of them both not sharing romantic feelings for each other.
- Ko Ko Lin Maung as U Phone Nyan, an owner of a travel agency and Nay Cho Thway's father who drowned himself with debt via his obsession with gambling.
- Min Thit as U Sai Min Shein, strict and perfectionist father of Sai Nay Yaung and Nan Yati.
- Khin Than Nwet as Daw Nan Kyay Hmone, empathetic mother of Sai Nay Yaung and Nan Yati.
- War War Aung as Daw Si Si Zaw, Amy Zaw's avaricious and domineering mother and U Phone Nyan's reluctant friend.
- Nay Linn as Par Kyé, cheerful and silly housekeeper-cook working for Sai Nay Yaung.
- Thaw Bhone Sett (child actor) as Go Goe Lay, rumored son of Sai Nay Yaung.
