= I'm Mahaythi =

Burmese television series

- Burmese: ကျွန်မကမဟေသီ
- Genre: Drama
- Based on: I'm Mahaythi by Shin Ma
- Screenplay by: Aye Moht Moht Aung; Aye Chan Mon
- Directed by: Ei Ei Khaing (အိအိခိုင်)
- Starring: Aung Yay Chan; Wint Yamone Naing; Than Thar Moe Theint
- Theme music composer: Za War (ဇဝါ)
- Country of origin: Myanmar
- Original language: Burmese
- No. of episodes: 43

Production
- Executive producer: Khin Lay
- Producers: Naing Than; Niyyayana Production
- Production location: Myanmar
- Editors: May Oo Myint; Khin La Pyae Win
- Running time: 40 minutes Mondays to Fridays at 20:45 (MMT)
- Production company: Niyyayana Production

Original release
- Network: MRTV-4
- Release: 18 February – 18 April 2019

I'm Mahaythi (Burmese: ကျွန်မကမဟေသီ) is a 2019 Burmese drama television series. It is based on the eponymous popular novel written by Shin Ma. It aired on MRTV-4, from February 18 to April 18, 2019, on Mondays to Fridays at 20:45 for 43 episodes.

== Synopsis ==
The peaceful and happy family of the Min Myo Nwe, San Myan, and their son A Nwe Taw were separated due to circumstances. On a solo trip to Yangon, Min Myo Nwe met with an accident on the road and ended up suffering from amnesia. As a result, he is enable to recall past events regarding his family. Seeing this as an opportunity to escape their financial distress, Main Ma Chaw and her son Mone Mann, who were on the same bus as him, decided to impersonate in the place of Min Myo Nwe's wife and son in an attempt to leave their rocky life behind. As Min Myo Nwe's parents gradually begin to realize the missing dots, follow the emotional journey as San Myan set out to reveal her true identity and reclaim her love in a moralistic story of karma, determination and loyalty.

== Cast ==
=== Main ===
- Aung Yay Chan as Min Myo Nwe, husband of San Myan and father of A Nwe Taw. He is a carefree person who left his family at a young age after refusing to live a life with pride. After suffering from a brain injury, he struggles to remember his past, but not his true feelings.
- Wint Yamone Naing as San Myan, wife of Min Myo Nwe and mother of A Nwe Taw. She is a skillful nurse.
- Than Thar Moe Theint as Main Ma Chaw, wife of U Wai La and mother of Mone Mann who abandoned her husband and poses as the partner of Min Myo Nwe in greed for a wealthy life.

=== Supporting ===
- Zaw Oo as U Myat Khaung, a highly ambitious, hot-tempered and disabled uncle of Min Myo Nwe and older brother of Daw Myat Nwe.
- May Thinzar Oo as Daw Myat Nwe, mother of Min Myo Nwe who loves her son deeply.
- Ye Aung as U Min Oo, father of Min Myo Nwe.
- Arr Koe Yar as Mone Mann, a rebellious son of Main Ma Chaw and U Wai La.
- Pyae Thuta Naing as A Nwe Taw, the son of Min Myo Nwe and San Myan.
- Zin Myo as U Wai La, a loving husband of Main Ma Chaw who is burdened to deal with the chaos his wife left behind.
- Mayn Hein as Lwin Aung, best friend of Min Myo Nwe.
- Great Chan
- Moe Thiri Htet
- Eaint Kyi Phyu
- La Won Thit
- Zaw Oo
- Goon Pone Gyi
- Kaung Htet Thar
- Hein Yatu
- Khun Seng
