= The Three Men, She Loves =

2019 Burmese Film

- Film Poster
- Burmese: ကျွန်မအချစ်ဆုံးယောက်ျားသုံးယောက်
- Directed by: Maung Myo Min
- Screenplay by: Maung Myo Min; Nat Khat Ni
- Story by: Khin Saw Oo
- Starring: Yan Aung; Pyay Ti Oo; Min Oo; Min Phone Myat; Moht Moht Myint Aung; Eaindra Kyaw Zin; Nan Sandar Hla Htun; Emily Bo
- Cinematography: Myo Myint Swe
- Production company: Sein Htay Film Production
- Release date: March 15, 2019
- Running time: 114 minutes
- Country: Myanmar
- Language: Burmese

The Three Men, She Loves (Burmese: ကျွန်မအချစ်ဆုံးယေက်ျားသုံးယောက်) is a 2019 Burmese drama film, directed by Maung Myo Min starring Yan Aung, Pyay Ti Oo, Min Oo, Min Phone Myat, Moht Moht Myint Aung, Eaindra Kyaw Zin, Nan Sandar Hla Htun and Emily Bo.

== Cast ==
- Eaindra Kyaw Zin as Thamudaya Khin
- Pyay Ti Oo as Thet Wai
- Yan Aung as U Ko Ko Latt
- Min Oo as Ye Htut
- Min Phone Myat as Min Phone Myat
- Nan Sandar Hla Htun as Wah Goon Phyu
- Moht Moht Myint Aung as mother of Thamudaya Khin
- Emily Bo as Emily Bo
- Jo Jin Hee as Yu-mi
- Pyae Pyae as Ji-ae
