= Oo Yin Mhu Phit Phu Chin The =

Burmese television series

- Burmese: ဥယျာဉ်မှူးဖြစ်ဖူးချင်သည်
- Genre: Drama
- Screenplay by: Nyi Aung Nyi
- Directed by: Ko Thaung
- Starring: Kyaw Hsu; Poe Kyar Phyu Khin; Khay Sett Thwin; Hein Htet
- Theme music composer: Ko Aung Li
- Country of origin: Myanmar
- Original language: Burmese
- No. of episodes: 28

Production
- Executive producer: Khin Lay
- Producers: Naing Than; Kaung Zan
- Production location: Myanmar
- Cinematography: Myo Myint Kyaw Htin
- Editors: Phone Pyae Sone; Yoon Yoon San; Than Htun Win; Mhway Wutyi
- Running time: 40 minutes Mondays to Fridays at 19:00 (MMT)
- Production company: Media Kabar

Original release
- Network: MRTV-4
- Release: 14 December 2017 – 19 January 2018

Oo Yin Mhu Phit Phu Chin The (Burmese: ဥယျာဉ်မှူးဖြစ်ဖူးချင်သည်) is a Burmese drama television series. It aired on MRTV-4, from December 14, 2017 to January 19, 2018, on Mondays to Fridays at 19:00 for 28 episodes.

== Cast ==
- Kyaw Hsu as Ye Jar
- Khay Sett Thwin as Zun Pann
- Poe Kyar Phyu Khin as Wai Wai Aung, Sayarma Ma Wai
- Hein Htet as Htet Yan
- Thet Oo Ko as Htet Naing
