= Nwam Jar Thaing =

Burmese writer (1952–2020)

- နွမ်ဂျာသိုင်း
- Born: Win Myint Maung; 19 November 1952; Thazi, Myanmar
- Died: 27 June 2020 (aged 67); Pinlon Hospital, Yangon, Myanmar
- Resting place: Yayway Cemetery, Yangon
- Education: Rangoon Arts and Sciences University
- Occupations: Writer, novelist
- Children: Nay Chi Win Lae Yi; Aung Se Sar; May Myat Waso
- Parents: U Mya; Ma Ma Gyi

Nwam Jar Thaing (Burmese: နွမ်ဂျာသိုင်း; also spelled Nwan Jar Thine, born Win Myint Maung, 19 November 1952 – 27 June 2020) was a prominent Burmese writer and novelist. He is best known for numerous popular novels, including Oo-daung Yin-pyan Bon Nabay Mhar Ser Yay Loh Htar Chin De (ဒေါင်းယာဉ်ပျံဘုံနံဘေးမှာ စာရေးလို့ထားချင်တယ်), Once...At University (တစ်ခါတုန်းကတက္ကသိုလ်မှာ), University In Dream (အိပ်မက်ထဲကတက္ကသိုလ်), Hnit Nar Ket Loh Tine Pin Chin De (နှစ် နားကပ်လို့ တိုင်ပင်ချင်တယ်), Alel Ka Lu Sakar Wae Ei (အလယ်ကလူ စကားဝဲ၏) and Par Kwut Kyar Nae Lapyae Wun (ပါးကွက်ကျားနဲ့ လပြည့်ဝန်း). Nwam Jar Thaing was a member of the Central Executive Committee of the Myanmar Writers Association. He was also a member of the 2012 Myanmar Academy Awards nominees and Myanmar National Literature Awards nominees.

== Biography ==
Nwam Jar Thaing was born on 19 November 1952 in Thazi to parents U Mya and Ma Ma Gyi. He is the eldest child among seven siblings. He graduated high school from Basic Education High School No. 2 Insein in 1971. He studied at Rangoon Institute of Technology majoring in Electrical Power and was expelled from university in fifth year for participating in the Hmaing Yar Pyae protests. Then he joined the Rangoon Arts and Sciences University and graduated with a degree in Physics.

In 1969, he started writing the articles and short novels in local magazines A He, Thint Bawa and Tine Yin May. In 1973, he published his first novel Par Kwut Kyar Nae Lapyae Wun. He then published the novel A Chit Sone Thu Ye A Htoke Pati in 1973. He has had published over 90 novels until his death, and still republished his works. He also wrote some scripts for films. Many of his novels were converted into films during the 1990s.

Nwam Jar Thaing died from heart disease on 27 June 2020, at the age of 67, and was buried in Yayway Cemetery on 29 June 2020. He was survived by his wife and three daughters Nay Chi Win Lae Yi, an art designer, Aung Se Sar, an architect and May Myat Waso, a fashion designer.
