= Poe Kyar Phyu Khin =

Burmese actress

- ပိုးကြာဖြူခင်
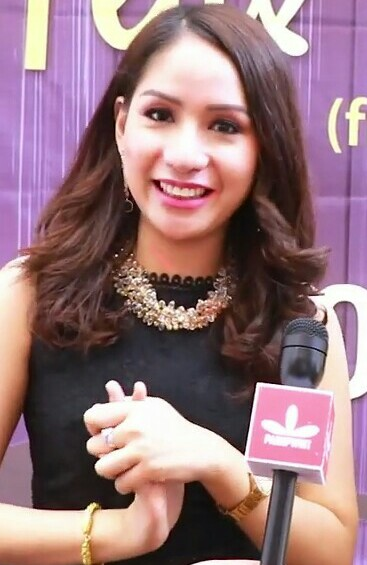
- Born: 3 December 1992 (age 33); Yangon, Myanmar
- Education: Dagon University
- Occupations: Actress, model
- Years active: 2014–present
- Spouse: Pekay Tun
- Awards: Miss Bago 2012 (Winner); Miss Universe Myanmar 2013 (Top 10); Miss Universe Myanmar 2014 (Top 10)

Poe Kyar Phyu Khin (Burmese: ပိုးကြာဖြူခင်; born 3 December 1992) is a Burmese television actress. She gained popularity among the audiences after starring her role as Seng Mai in MRTV-4 television series Moe Kaung Kin Eain Met (2018).

== Early life and education ==
Poe Kyar Phyu Khin was on 3 December 1992 in Yangon, Myanmar. She has three sibilings, an older sister and three younger brothers. She attended high school at Basic Education High School No. 4 Botataung. She graduated from Dagon University.

== Career ==
She started her career from attending at Stars & Models Int'l in 2014. In 2015, she starred in her debut MRTV-4 thriller-drama series Wingabar San Eain alongside Aung Min Khant, Hsaung Wutyee May, Aung Yay Chan, Myat Thu Thu and Phone Shein Khant. In 2016, she starred in comedy-drama series Ma Ma Htake and Heritage House alongside Khine Thin Kyi, Hein Htet, Mone, May Akari Htoo and Hsu Waddy. In 2017, she starred in drama series Oo Yin Mhu Phit Phu Chin The alongside Kyaw Hsu, Hein Htet (actor) and Khay Sett Thwin.

But currently she is maintaining jewellery shop: PK Htun, in Mandalay, with her husband together.

In 2018, she starred in drama series Moe Kaung Kin Eain Met alongside Si Thu Win and Kyaw Htet Zaw. In 2019, she starred in drama series Kyal Kalay Yae Kaung Kin alongside Khant Si Thu and Kyaw Htet Zaw.

== Filmography ==
=== Television series ===
- Winkabar San Eain (ဝင်္ကပါစံအိမ်) (2015)
- Ma Ma Htake and Heritage House (မမထိပ်နှင့်အမွေစံအိမ်) (2016)
- Oo Yin Mhu Phit Phu Chin The (ဥယျာဉ်မှူးဖြစ်ဖူးချင်သည်) (2017)
- Moe Kaung Kin Eain Met (မိုးကောင်းကင်အိပ်မက်) (2018)
- Kyal Kalay Yae Kaung Kin (ကြယ်ကလေးရဲ့ကောင်းကင်) (2019)
- Mar Yar Hlae Kwat (မာယာလှည့်ကွက်) (2020)
- Kwat Lat Ma Shi (ကွက်လပ်မရှိ) (2022)

== Discography ==
=== Singles ===
- You are My Life with Sein Lin (2019)
- Moe Lay Phwae Tone with Sein Lin (2019)
