= Khin Moht Moht Aye =

Burmese actress

- ခင်မို့မို့အေး
- Born: Myanmar
- Occupation: Actress

Khin Moht Moht Aye (Burmese: ခင်မို့မို့အေး, also spelt Khin Moh Moh Aye) is a Burmese actress. She won her first Best Supporting Actress Award in 2008 with A-Myer Nae Ma Thet Hsaing Thaw Thu (The Man who foreign to Public). Throughout her career, she has acted in over 500 films.

She starred in numerous films and TV series. In many films and TV series, her villainous performances have garnered increased attention and popularity.

== Filmography ==
=== Film (Cinema) ===
- A-Myer Nae Ma Thet Hsaing Thaw Thu (The Man who foreign to Public) (2008)
- Asoe Maya Anetta (အစိုးမရ-အနတ္တ)
- Chitchin Alinkar (ချစ်ခြင်းအလင်္ကာ)

=== Television series ===
- Pan Nu Thway Season 1 (2013)
- The Sign of Love: Book 2 (2014)
- Pan Nu Thway Season 2 (2015)
- A Yake (2018)
- Kyamar Noon (2018)
- Rose (2019)
- Say Ta Lone Maung Phone (2021)
- Mahuyar Pearl (2023)

== Awards and nominations ==
Year	Award	Category	Nominated work	Result
2008	Myanmar Academy Award	Best Supporting Actress	A-Myer Nae Ma Thet Hsaing Thaw Thu (The Man who foreign to Public)	Won
