= Myanmar Idol season 3 =

Season of television show

Myanmar Idol
- Season 3
- Hosted by: Kyaw Htet Aung
- Judges: Myanmar Pyi Thein Tan; Yan Aung; Myo Kyawt Myaing; Tin Zar Maw
- Winner: Phyo Myat Aung
- Runner-up: ChanMyae MgCho
- Finals venue: Haxagon Complex
- Wild Card Winner: Zaw Gyi

Release
- Original network: MNTV
- Original release: April 17 – August 11, 2018

Season chronology
- ← Previous; Season 2 Next → Season 4

The third season of Myanmar Idol premiered on April 17, 2018, and continued until August 11, 2018. It was won by Phyo Myat Aung. The third season was co-hosted by Kyaw Htet Aung, the latter of whom left the show after the season ended.

== Regional auditions ==
Auditions were held in Mandalay, Taunggyi, Magwe, Pathein, and Yangon from January to February 2018, and around 10,000 attended the auditions.

Episode Air Date	Audition City	Date	Audition Venues	Golden Tickets
April 17, 2018	Mandalay	January 20–21, 2018	Royal Mingalar Hotel	28
April 24, 2018	Taunggyi	January 28–29, 2018	Kyauk Taing Kwin	29
May 1, 2018	Magwe	February 5–6, 2018	City Hall	20
May 8, 2018	Pathein	February 13, 2018	City Hall	15
May 15, 22, 2018	Yangon	February 20–22, 2018	Shwe Htut Tin	37
Total Tickets to Golden Week				129

=== Structure of auditions ===
There are usually two stages in the audition process. The first round is the casting round, and they sing in front of the executive producers, and more are eliminated. In the second round, those who survive the first stage sing in front of the judges, and this is the audition shown on television. Those who gain at least three "yes" votes from the four judges then receive a golden ticket to Golden Week.

== Golden Week ==
It featured three rounds: Round 1, Group Round, and Solo Round. In the first round, each contestant sang individually, and after they sang, they gathered in a line. Those who impressed the judges advanced to the next round, where the contestants performed in groups of four or five, singing a song together. The remaining auditionees who passed the group rounds performed their final solos to advance in the Green Mile.

=== Green Mile ===
Color key:

Female contestant
Male contestant
Contestant was chosen by the judges to move on to the Top 10
Contestant was eliminated

Order	Contestant	Age	Hometown	Audition city	Song	Result
1	Chan Nyein	26 (In that time)	Yangon	Yangon	"Nay Sin Yat Set" (နေ့စဉ်ရက်ဆက်)	Advanced
2	Shine Htet Chuu	29 (In that time)	Hopong	Taunggyi	"Tha Chin Mae Guitar" (သီချင်းမဲ့ဂစ်တာ)	Eliminated
3	Wyne Sat Ni	20 (In that time)	Yangon	Yangon	"Kway Tae A Hti" (ကြွေတဲ့အထိ)	Eliminated
4	Swan Pyae Aung	25 (In that time)	Pyin Oo Lwin	Mandalay	"Nauk Ba Wa Mar Myae Sone Khae Kya Yin" (နောက်ဘဝမှာများဆုံခဲ့ကြရင်)	Eliminated
5	Mai Mai Seng	23 (In that time)	Myitkyina	Mandalay	"Sa Nay Daung Mar Pan Lu Mal" (စနေထောင့်မှာပန်းလှူမယ်)	Advanced
6	Veronika	20 (In that time)	Pekon Township	Taunggyi	"Toe Way Kya Par So" (တို့ဝေးကြပါစို့)	Eliminated
7	Billy La Min Aye	21 (In that time)	Taunggyi	Taunggyi	"Chit Myae A Tine Chit Mal" (ချစ်မြဲအတိုင်းချစ်မယ်)	Advanced
8	Christina BLY	18 (In that time)	Yangon	Yangon	"Shay Ka Lan Myar" (ရှေ့ကလမ်းများ)	Eliminated
9	June Naung JN	25	Pyinmana	Nay Pyi Taw	"Lu Ko Yu Par A Thal Ko Chan Thar Pay Par" (လူကိုယူပါအသည်းကိုချမ်းသာပေးပါ)	Eliminated
10	Ye Naung	22	Ma-ubin	Yangon	"A Myae Tan Min" (အမြဲတမ်းမင်း)	Advanced
11	Thar Nge	22 (In that time)	Pyin Oo Lwin	Mandalay	"Bar Lo Nay Thay Lae" (ဘာလိုနေသေးလဲ)	Advanced
12	Bo Bo Htut	26 (In that time)	Yangon	Yangon	"N/A" (N/A)	Eliminated
13	Poe Mi	28 (In that time)	Yangon	Yangon	"Thwar Ma Yone Buu" (သွား..မယုံဘူး)	Advanced
14	Zin Gyi	23 (In that time)	Yangon	Taunggyi	"Lu Tway Ma Myin Nain Aung Lwan Mal" (လူတွေမမြင်နိုင်အောင်လွမ်းမယ်)	Advanced
15	Thet Aung	22 (In that time)	Yangon	Mandalay	"Myin Thaw Ngo Thaw Myet Lone Myar" (မြင်သောငိုသောမျက်လုံးများ)	Eliminated
16	Yoon	19 (In that time)	Taunggyi	Taunggyi	"Yin Kone Than A Yin Nee Sone" (ရင်ခုန်သံအရင်းနှီးဆုံး)	Advanced
17	Phyo Aung	20 (In that time)	Kalaw	Taunggyi	"Htwat Pauk" (ထွက်ပေါက်)	Eliminated
18	Phyu Lay	24 (In that time)	Mandalay	Mandalay	"Dan Yar Mae A Nar" (ဒဏ်ရာမဲ့အနာ)	Advanced
19	Nay Zar Kim	25 (In that time)	Mandalay	Mandalay	"Tha Khin" (သခင်)	Eliminated
20	A Mi Zan	22 (In that time)	Hpa-an	Hpa-an	"Yat Yat Sat Sat" (ရက်ရက်စက်စက်)	Advanced

== Top 11 Finalists and stages ==
Nan Shwe Yee, Swan Pyae Aung, Nilen, Ngwe Zin Hlaine, Naw Jas, May Madi, Phyo Myat Aung, Pyae Phyo, Zaw Gyi, Nay Khant Min Thit, ChanMyae MgCho.

Color key:

Contestant was saved by public's vote
Contestant was in the bottom three, but was saved by public's vote
Contestant got the highest public votes
Contestant got the elimination result, but was saved by Judges
Contestant was eliminated, but got a chance to return to competetation with Pantene wild card
Contestant was eliminated

=== Week 1: Top 11 – ===
Order	Contestant	Song (Burmese name)	Result
1	Nan Shwe Yee	"Hello" (ခေါ်သံကြားလား)	Bottom 3
2	Swan Pyae Aung	"Mone Phwae Tay" (မုန်းဖွဲ့တေး)	Eliminated
3	Nilen	"Cherry Myo" (ချယ်ရီမြို့)	Safe
4	Ngwe Zin Hlaine	"Ma Ngo Nae Tawt" (မငိုနဲ့တော့)	Safe
5	Naw Jas	"Tate Tate Lay Kyay Kwae" (တိတ်တိတ်လေးကြေကွဲ)	Safe
6	May Madi	"A Yin Taing Pae" (အရင်တိုင်းပဲ)	Safe
7	Phyo Myat Aung	"Ko Yay Yar Za Win" (ကိုယ်ရေးရာဇဝင်)	Highest Votes
8	Pyae Phyo	"Chit Taing Lae Ma Nyar" (ချစ်တိုင်းလည်းမညား)	Bottom 3
9	Zaw Gyi	"Phan Sin Thu" (ဖန်ဆင်းသူ)	Safe
10	Nay Khant Min Thit	"Yuu Chin Yaung Saung Ma Nay Nae" (ရူးချင်ယောင်ဆောင်မနေနဲ့)	Safe
11	ChanMyae MgCho	"A Sate Kwat" (အဆိပ်ခွက်)	Safe

=== Week 2: Top 10 – Retro Music ===
Order	Contestant	Song (Burmese name)	Result
1	Naw Jas	"Htain Chute Thu" (ထိန်းချုပ်သူ)	Eliminated
2	Zaw Gyi	"Ko Tway Mat Tan" (ကိုယ်တွေ့မှတ်တမ်း)	Safe
3	Nan Shwe Yee	"Eate Say Ma Shi" (အိပ်ဆေးမရှိ)	Eliminated
4	Pyae Phyo	"Chit Tay Lay" (ချစ်တေလေ)	Safe
5	Nilen	"A Phyo Sin" (အပျိုစင်)	Safe
6	Nay Khant Min Thit	"A Thel Kwe Myo Taw" (အသည်းကွဲမြို့တော်)	Safe
7	May Madi	"A Chit Nae A Mone" (အချစ်နဲ့အမုန်း)	Safe
8	ChanMyae MgCho	"Dan Dar Yee" (ဒဏ္ဍာရီ)	Safe
9	Ngwe Zin Hlaine	"Nar Lal Thint Pyi" (နားလည်သင့်ပြီ)	Bottom 3
10	Phyo Myat Aung	"Ko Yae Ba Yin Ma" (ကိုယ့်ရဲ့ဘုရင်မ)	Highest Votes

=== Week 3: Top 8 – Khine Htoo's songs ===
Order	Contestant	Song (Burmese name)	Result
1	Nay Khant Min Thit	"Shwe La Thar Mha" (ရွှေလသာမှ)	Safe
2	Ngwe Zin Hlaine	"Thi Lar" (သိလား)	Safe
3	Phyo Myat Aung	"Khat Tar" (ခတ္တာ)	Highest Votes
4	Pyae Phyo	"Hnin Wai Tae Saung" (နှင်းဝေတဲ့ဆောင်း)	Eliminated
5	ChanMyae MgCho	"A Chit Tha Chin" (အချစ်သီချင်း)	Bottom 3
6	May Madi	"Nay Yar Haung" (နေရာဟောင်း)	Safe
7	Zaw Gyi	"Tha Chin Ta Pote Pan Ta Sote" (သီချင်းတစ်ပုဒ်ပန်းတစ်ဆုပ်)	Safe
8	Nilen	"Eain A Lwan" (အိမ်အလွမ်း)	Bottom 3

=== Week 4: Top 7 – Rainy season songs ===
Order	Contestant	Song (Burmese name)	Result
1	ChanMyae MgCho	"Ywar Thar Ywar Par Moe" (ရွာသာရွာပါမိုး)	Safe
2	Nilen	"Moe Yar Thi Hte" (မိုးရာသီထဲ)	Safe
3	Zaw Gyi	"Yin Ta Ko Moe" (ရင်တကိုယ်မိုး)	Bottom 3
4	Phyo Myat Aung	"Moe" (မိုး)	Highest Votes
5	Nay Khant Min Thit	"A Khar Lwon Moe" (အခါလွန်မိုး)	Bottom 3
6	May Madi	"Moe Thel Htae Mar" (မင်းအတွက်အသက်ရှင်သူ)	Eliminated
7	Ngwe Zin Hlaine	"Ma Ywar Nae Oo Moe" (မရွာနဲ့ဦးမိုး)	Safe

=== Week 5: Top 6 – Latin Music ===
No elimination because Nay Khant Min Thit was saved by judges.

Order	Contestant	Song (Burmese name)	Result
1	Phyo Myat Aung	"Sate Tay Lay" (စိတ်တေလေ)	Highest Votes
2	Ngwe Zin Hlaine	"A Htoo Ae Thal" (အထူးဧည့်သည့်)	Bottom 3
3	Nay Khant Min Thit	"Eate Phan Saung" (အိပ်ဖန်စောင့်)	Saved by judges
4	ChanMyae MgCho	"Ka Pwae Eain Mat" (ကပွဲအိပ်မက်)	Bottom 3
5	Zaw Gyi	"Yee Sar Oo Zat Lann" (ရည်စားဦးဇာတ်လမ်း)	Safe
6	Nilen	"Pyan Thein Htar Mal" (ပြန်သိမ်းထားမယ်)	Safe

=== Week 6: Top 6 – Rock Music ===
Double elimination because Nay Khant Min Thit was saved by judges in previous week.

Order	Contestant	Song (Burmese name)	Result
1	Nilen	"Thate Paing Tae Min" (သိပ်ပိုင်တဲ့မင်း)	Eliminated
2	Nay Khant Min Thit	"Yin Khone Lite Tine" (ရင်ခုန်လိုက်တိုင်း)	Bottom 3
3	ChanMyae MgCho	"Min Nga Ko That Tal" (မင်းငါ့ကိုသတ်တယ်)	Safe
4	Ngwe Zin Hlaine	"Yin Saing Mal" (ရင်ဆိုင်မယ်)	Safe
5	Zaw Gyi	"Arr Lone Pyan Yu Thwar Par" (အားလုံးပြန်ယူသွားပါ)	Eliminated
6	Phyo Myat Aung	"Mu Yar" (မူယာ)	Highest Votes

=== Week 7: Top 4 + Wild Card winner – Jazz Music ===
Double elimination because Zaw Gyi was returned by Wild Card.

Order	Contestant	Song (Burmese name)	Result
1	Phyo Myat Aung	"Maw Myay Toe Ko Lar Mal" (မောမြေသို့ကိုယ်လာမယ်)	Bottom 3
2	Ngwe Zin Hlaine	"Innyar Mar Sone So Kwal" (အင်းယားမှာဆုံစို့ကွယ်)	Eliminated
3	Nay Khant Min Thit	"Thu A Twat Tay Kabyar" (သူ့အတွက်တေးကဗျာ)	Eliminated
4	ChanMyae MgCho	"San Yay Sat Tway Nae May Chit Thu" (စမ်းရေစက်တွေနဲ့မေ့ချစ်သူ)	Highest Votes
5	Zaw Gyi (wild card winner)	"Shwe Nyar Thu Thar Thi Par Say" (ရွှေညာသူသာသိပါစေ)	Safe (Wild Card Winner)

=== Week 8: Top 3 – Hits songs and Duet with star ===
Order	Contestant	Single song (Burmese name)	Order	Duet song (Burmese name)	Star	Result
1	ChanMyae MgCho	"Kya Ma" (ကျွန်မ)	4	"Toe Ma Way Buu" (တို့မဝေးဘူး)	Si Thu Lwin	Highest Votes
2	Zaw Gyi	"Lo Tha Lo Thone" (လိုသလိုသုံး)	5	"Ta Yauk Tae Ngo Mal" (တစ်ယောက်တည်းငိုမယ်)	Jewel	Eliminated
3	Phyo Myat Aung	"Zero" (သုည)	6	"Kyo Pa Khat Nite Nyi Twal Chin" (ကြိုးပခက်၌ငြိတွယ်ခြင်း)	Sone Thin Par	Safe

=== Week 9: Finale ===
ChanMyae MgCho didn't participate in grand finale because of health problem. So Phyo Myat Aung automatically won the first prize. But she performed with one song (winner song) in late time.

Contestant	Order	Judges chose song (Burmese name)	Order	contestant chose song (Burmese name)	Order	Winner song (Burmese name)	Result
Phyo Myat Aung	1	"Ma Ma" (မမ)	2	"Nhote Sat Chain" (နှုတ်ဆက်ချိန်)	3	"Thint A Twat Ma Net Phyan" (သင့်အတွက်မနက်ဖြန်)	Winner
ChanMyae MgCho		did not perform due to illness		did not perform due to illness	4	"Thint A Twat Ma Net Phyan" (သင့်အတွက်မနက်ဖြန်)	Runner-up

== Elimination Chart ==
Order	Contestant	Top 11	Top 10	Top 8	Top 7	Top 6	Top 6	Top 4+1	Top 3	Finale
1	Phyo Myat Aung	Highest Votes	Highest Votes	Highest Votes	Highest Votes	Highest Votes	Highest Votes	Bottom 3	Safe	Winner
2	ChanMyae MgCho	Safe	Safe	Bottom 3	Safe	Bottom 3	Safe	Highest Votes	Highest Votes	Runner-up
3	Zaw Gyi	Safe	Safe	Safe	Bottom 3	Safe	Eliminated	Returned by Wild Card and safe	Eliminated	
4	Ngwe Zin Hlaine	Safe	Bottom 3	Safe	Safe	Bottom 3	Safe	Eliminated		
5	Nay Khant Min Thit	Safe	Safe	Safe	Bottom 3	Saved by judges	Bottom 3	Eliminated		
6	Nilen	Safe	Safe	Bottom 3	Safe	Safe	Eliminated			
7	May Madi	Safe	Safe	Safe	Eliminated					
8	Pyae Phyo	Bottom 3	Safe	Eliminated						
9	Nan Shwe Yee	Bottom 3	Eliminated							
10	Naw Jas	Safe	Eliminated							
11	Swan Pyae Aung	Eliminated								
