= Ah Boy =

Burmese hip hop singer-songwriter

- အာဘွိုင်း
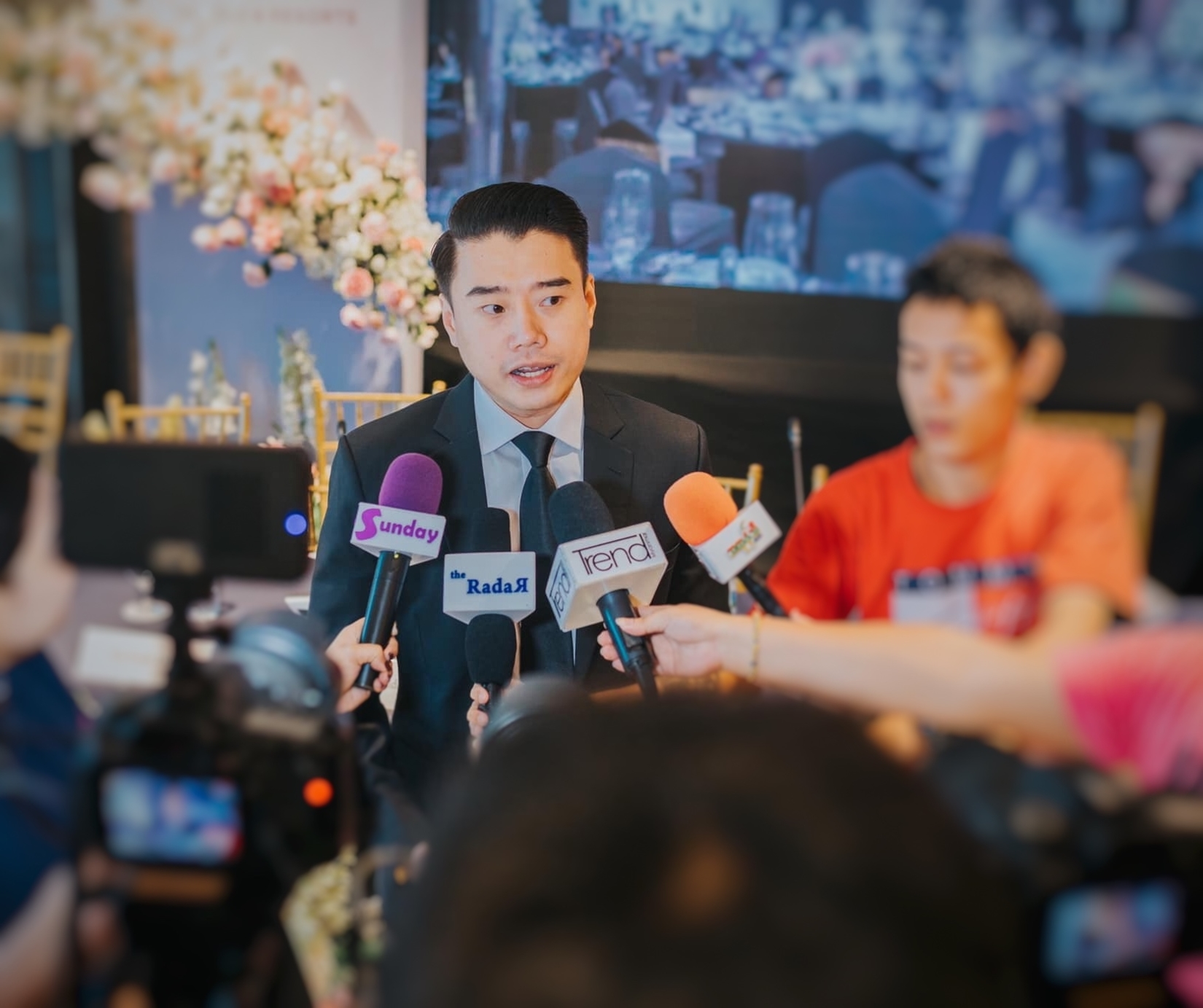
- Ah Boy in 2019
- Born: Kyaw Phyo Tun; 13 January 1986 (age 40); Myeik, Tanintharyi Division, Myanmar
- Occupations: Singer-songwriter, businessman
- Height: 5 ft 7 in (1.70 m)
- Spouses: Cindy (m. 2006; div. 2012) Myat Yadanar Kyaw (m. 2017)
- Children: Juliet; Jewel; Scarlett Phyo Tun
- Parent(s): Sein Wan; Myint Zu Htun
- Musical career
- Genre: Hip hop
- Instruments: Vocals
- Years active: 2002–present
- Formerly of: Rock$tar

Ah Boy (Burmese: အာဘွိုင်း; born Kyaw Phyo Tun; on 13 January 1986) is a Burmese hip hop singer-songwriter, pioneer of the third generation of Burmese hip hop and businessman of Sino-Mon descent. He is the former lead vocalist of the popular Burmese hip hop band Rock$tar.

== Early life and education ==
Ah Boy was born to Sein Wan, a well-known Moulmeinian business tycoon and his wife Myint Zu Htun in Myeik, Tanintharyi Division, Myanmar on 13 January 1986. Ah Boy is of Sino-Mon descent. He has a younger sister and a younger brother. He is a nephew of actor Lwin Moe. His family moved to Yangon from Myeik at his age 3. He attended high school at International School of Myanmar (ISM) and also educated in Practising School Yangon Institute of Education.

== Career ==
=== Music career ===
Ah Boy started his music career in 2002, while still a student. Shortly after, he became a member of the hip hop boy band Rock$tar and released songs and mix-tapes, collaborating with Rock$tar's members. Since then he has worked with mainstream artists. He is also active as a solo singer and launched his debut album Ta Yoke Tan (Chinatown) in 2007.

On 7 June 2020, he released a single song with featured artist, ChanMyae MgCho, called "A Ngweh A That Myar" (အ‌ငွေ့အသက်များ) which peaked at number one on Joox's top 100 chart. That song listed in the Top 10 Popular Songs of Year 2020 and also won the JOOX 2020 Popular Song Award. On 11 November 2020, he released a single song with featured artist, Key Layshi, called "Kyay Kyun" (ကျေးကျွန်).

=== Business career ===
His family owns many business in Myanmar, including Myanmar Lighting – IPP Co., Ltd and Bedok Construction and Engineering Co., Ltd. He is working as the managing director of both Myanmar Lighting – IPP Co., Ltd and Bedok Construction and Engineering Co., Ltd. He is also a director of Southern Myanmar Development Co., Ltd.

Ah Boy is also a co-owner of FUSE, a club in Yangon.

== Social works ==
In March 2021, Ah Boy and his wife, Myat Yadanar Kyaw, launched a campaign "Support Local Business" to help local businesses.

In July 2021, Ah Boy and Kyi Thar Han launched Dynamic Health Myanmar to donate 100 oxygen tanks (40 liter) to people who needed oxygen during the COVID-19 pandemic in Myanmar.

== Discography ==
=== Solo albums ===
- Ta Yoke Tan (တရုတ်တန်း) (2007)

=== Singles ===
- A Ngweh A That Myar (2020)
- Kyay Kyun (2020)

== Personal life ==
Ah Boy married to singer Cindy in 2006. They have two daughters and divorced in 2012.

On 23 June 2012, he had seen a relationship with actress San Yati Moe Myint, but they broke up after some years.

In 2016, he had a relationship with model Myat Yadanar Kyaw and they married on 21 December 2017. Myat gave birth to their first daughter Scarlett Phyo Tun in 2018.
