= Ya Wai Aung =

Burmese actor and model

- ရဝေအောင်
- Born: Ya Wai Aung; 22 September 1976 (age 49); Myitkyina, Kachin State, Myanmar
- Education: University of Distance Education, Yangon
- Occupations: Actor, model
- Years active: 1994–present
- Height: 5 ft 10 in (1.78 m)
- Parent(s): Aung Than Tun; Khin May Kyi

Ya Wai Aung (Burmese: ရဝေအောင်; also spelled Yawai Aung, born 22 September 1976) is a Burmese actor and model who was popular in the 1990s. Once he was one of the most successful actors in Myanmar.

== Early life and education ==
Ya Wai Aung was born on 22 September 1976 in Myitkyina, Kachin State. He is the grandnephew of a former Prime Minister of Burma Thura Tun Tin. He graduated from University of Distance Education, Yangon with a degree in physics.

== Career ==
In 1994, he began his career as a photo model and appeared on local magazine cover photos. Then, he joined Tin Moe Lwin's model training agency Talent & Models in 1997. Since then, he took professional training in modelling and catwalk. He appeared as a runway model as part of the Talent & Models International with countless commercial shows and runways that had been walked on. In 1998, he appeared on many calendars and his photos took place on the calendars of every house. Then came the offers for TV commercial advertisements and music videos. His hard work as a model, and acting in music videos and TV commercials was noticed by the film industry and soon, film casting offers came rolling in.

He made his debut with the film Takhar Ka Ayeyarwaddy Nya Myar alongside Lwin Moe, Htun Eaindra Bo and May Than Nu. He then starred in his second film Thamee Mike alongside Lwin Moe and Htet Htet Moe Oo, screened in Myanmar cinemas on 22 December 2000 which led to increased recognition for him. He is noted for his leading roles in several Burmese films such as Ei Mhan Thaw Thitsar Sakarr Kyaung, Myit Hna Sin Ye Pinle, Myat Yay Ta Khar, Ma Ma Maung Maung Moht Moht, Fisher Village Story, Ngwe Pyaing Phyu, Shwe Ou, Thain Mwe and many others.

== Selected filmography ==
=== Film ===
- Takhar Ka Ayeyarwaddy Nya Myar (တစ်ခါကဧရာဝတီညများ)
- Thamee Mite (သမီးမိုက်) (2000)
- Ei Mhan Thaw Thitsar Sakarr Kyaung
- Myit Hna Sin Ye Pinle (မြစ်နှစ်စင်းရဲ့ပင်လယ်)
- Myat Yay Ta Khar (မျက်ရည်တံခါး)
- Ma Ma Maung Maung Moht Moht (မမ မောင်မောင် မို့မို့)
- Fisher Village Story (တံငါရွာပုံပြင်)
- Ngwe Pyaing Phyu (ငွေဗျိုင်းဖြူ)
- Shwe Ou (ရွှေအိုး)
- Thain Mwe (သိမ်မွေ့)
- Mway Shin (မွေးရှင်)
- Shwe Pyithu (ရွှေပြည်သူ)
- Mi Khin (မိခင်)
- Bhone Paw La Aw (ဗုံးပေါလအော)
