= Maung Mu Paing Shin =

Maung Mu Paing Shin may refer to:

- Maung Mu Paing Shin (2000 film), a Burmese musical drama romance film
- Maung Mu Paing Shin (1964 film), a Burmese black-and-white drama film
