= Yun Waddy Lwin Moe =

Burmese model and actress (born 1998)

- ယွန်းဝတီလွင်မိုး
- Born: Yun Waddy Lwin Moe; October 21, 1998 (age 27); Yangon, Myanmar
- Education: University of Melbourne
- Occupations: Model; actress
- Years active: 2012–present
- Spouse: Htet Oo Hlaing (m. 2018)
- Parent(s): Lwin Moe; May Thu
- Relatives: Yun Nandi Lwin Moe (sister)
- Modeling information
- Height: 5 ft 1 in (1.55 m)
- Hair color: black
- Eye color: black

Yun Waddy Lwin Moe (Burmese: ယွန်းဝတီလွင်မိုး; born 21 October 1998) is a Burmese model and actress.

== Career ==
She commenced her career as a child actor in numerous Burmese films. Over time, she ventured into the world of commercials, featuring in over 50 TV advertisements for brands such as Canmake, Kanebo, OPPO, Daisy Cotton, Pureen, Ovaltine, Alpine, Sein Nandaw, She Shines, Unique Clothing, and more. At the age of 20, she transitioned into modeling, gracing the runway at various fashion shows across Myanmar. From 2015 to 2020, she participated in the Myanmar International Fashion Week. In 2017, she was appointed as a UNICEF Youth Ambassador.

She made her big-screen debut in the 2024 drama film Shwe Phoo Ser, starring alongside Paing Takhon, Kaung Myat San, and Phway Phway.

== Political activities ==
Following the 2021 Myanmar coup d'état, she engaged fervently in the anti-coup movement, participating in rallies and leveraging social media platforms. Since February, she has consistently protested against the military takeover. She aligned herself with the "We Want Justice" movement, which originated on social media and has attracted numerous celebrities to its cause, using the iconic three-finger salute as a symbol of pro-democracy resistance.

She advocated for a social boycott and punishment for several local Burmese celebrities who aligned with and had connections to the military. Even though she is close to these celebrities, she emphasized, "Even if Myanmar achieves democracy after the people's Spring Revolution, we won't stop here. The social punishment movement and boycotts will persist. In this life, I recall that my mother was born to save my country."

In April 2021, warrants for her arrest were issued under Section 505(a) of the penal code by the State Administration Council for speaking out against the military coup. Along with several other celebrities, she was charged with calling for participation in the Civil Disobedience Movement (CDM) and damaging the state's ability to govern, with supporting the Committee Representing Pyidaungsu Hluttaw, and with generally inciting the people to disturb the peace and stability of the nation.

On 17 November 2022, the state-owned MRTV News reported that charges against a group of 11 artists, including Yun Waddy Lwin Moe and others, had been dropped.

== Personal life ==
Yun Waddy Lwin Moe was born on 21 October 1998 in Yangon. She is the eldest daughter of actor Lwin Moe and former TV host May Thu. She has one younger sibling Yun Nandi Lwin Moe.

In the June 22 issue of Unity Journal, the front-page headline claimed that "Yun Waddy Lwin Moe had reportedly eloped". However, contradictorily, it was later clarified on an inside page that the news about Yun Waddy Lwin Moe and Nay Shwe Thway Aung were false. This misleading reporting garnered significant attention nationwide. Consequently, May Thu, Yun Waddy Lwin Moe's mother, expressed outrage and threatened legal action for defamation. In response, the journal promptly issued an apology.

She married Htet Oo Hlaing on 4 January 2018. She gave birth to their first son Lwin Htet on 7 August 2018.

== Filmography ==
=== Film (Cinema) ===
Year	Title	Burmese Title	Co-stars	Note
2024	Shwe Shoo Ser	ရွှေဖူးစာ	Paing Takhon, Phway Phway	
