= Myanmar Idol season 2 =

Second season of Myanmar Idol

Myanmar Idol
- Season 2
- Hosted by: Kyaw Htet Aung
- Judges: Myanmar Pyi Thein Tan; May Sweet; Tin Zar Maw
- Winner: Thar Nge
- Runner-up: Billy La Min Aye
- Finals venue: Haxagon Complex
- Wild Card Winner: Zin Gyi

Release
- Original network: MNTV
- Original release: December 2, 2016 – March 25, 2017

Season chronology
- ← Previous; Season 1 Next → Season 3

The second season of Myanmar Idol premiered on December 2, 2016, and continued until March 25, 2017. It was won by Thar Nge. The second season was co-hosted by Kyaw Htet Aung, the latter of whom left the show after the season ended.

== Regional auditions ==
Auditions were held in Nay Pyi Taw, Mandalay, Taunggyi, Hpa-an, and Yangon from September to October 2016, and around 10,000 attended the auditions.

Episode Air Date	Audition City	Date	Audition Venues	Golden Tickets
December 2, 2016	Nay Pyi Taw	September 17–18, 2016	Mingalar Vuhar	18
December 2, 2016	Hpa-an	October 8–9, 2016	Zwekapin Hall	7
December 9, 2016	Mandalay	September 24–25, 2016	Swan Hotel	20
December 16, 2016	Taunggyi	October 1–2, 2016	Shan Sar Pay and Yin Kyay Mu	19
December 23, 30, 2016	Yangon	October 15–17, 2016	Shwe Htut Tin	22
Total Tickets to Golden Week				86

=== Structure of auditions ===
There are usually two stages in the audition process. The first round is the casting round, and they sing in front of the executive producers, and more are eliminated. In the second round, those who survive the first stage sing in front of the judges, and this is the audition shown on television. Those who gain at least two "yes" votes from the three judges then receive a golden ticket to Golden Week.

== Golden Week ==
It featured three rounds: Round 1, Group Round, and Solo Round. In the first round, each contestant sang individually, and after they sang, they gathered in a line. Those who impressed the judges advanced to the next round, where the contestants performed in groups of four or five, singing a song together. The remaining auditionees who passed the group rounds performed their final solos to advance in the Green Mile.

== Top 10 Finalists and stages ==
Ye Naung, Thar Nge, Zin Gyi, Mai Mai Seng, Chan Nyein, Poe Mi, A Mi Zan, Phyu Lay, Billy La Min Aye, Yoon

Color key:

Contestant was saved by public's vote
Contestant was in the bottom three, but was saved by public's vote
Contestant got the highest public votes
Contestant was eliminated

=== Week 1: Top 10– ===
Order	Contestant	Song (Burmese name)	Result
1	Ye Naung	"Jet Sin Htet Ka La Yeik Pyar" (ဂျပ်ဆင်ထိပ်ကလရိပ်ပြာ)	Safe And Highest Votes
2	Thar Nge	"House" (အိမ်)	Safe
3	Zin Gyi	"A Chit Mee" (အချစ်မီး)	Bottom 3
4	Mai Mai Seng	"Nay Yaung Aut Ka A Thet Shu Than Myar" (နေရောင်အောက်ကအသက်ရှူသံများ)	Safe
5	Chan Nyein	"Myaw Lint Nay Mal" (မျှော်လင့်နေမယ်)	Safe
6	Poe Mi	"A Shone Htet Po Thaw" (အရှုံးထက်ပိုသော)	Bottom 3
7	A Mi Zan	"Myaw Lint Chin Kwin Pyin" (မျှော်လင့်ခြင်းကွင်းပြင်)	Eliminated
8	Phyu Lay	"Myaw Lint Chin Lay" (မျှော်လင့်ခြင်းလေး)	Safe
9	Billy La Min Aye	"Soe Yain Chit" (စိုးရိမ်ချစ်)	Safe
10	Yoon	"Di Ka Saung Nay Thu" (ဒီကစောင့်နေသူ)	Safe

=== Week 2: Top 9 – 1990s ===
Order	Contestant	Song (Burmese name)	Result
1	Ye Naung	"Swint Sar Mal A Chit" (စွန့်စားမယ်အချစ်)	Safe And Highest Votes
2	Poe Mi	"Kal Tin Chin" (ကယ်တင်ခြင်း)	Safe
3	Thar Nge	"Tha Chin Chit Thu" (သီချင်းချစ်သူ)	Safe
4	Phyu Lay	"25 minutes" (၂၅မိနစ်)	Eliminated
5	Mai Mai Seng	"Ma Thi Lann" (မသိလမ်း)	Bottom 3
6	Chan Nyein	"Ko Kyaung" (ကိုယ့်ကြောင့်)	Safe
7	Yoon	"A Sate Ngwe Kyay" (အဆိပ်ငွေကြေး)	Bottom 3
8	Zin Gyi	"Swae Lann Mu Pyat Tha Nar" (စွဲလမ်းမှုပြဿနာ)	Safe
9	Billy La Min Aye	"Tan Ta Tae Nya" (တမ်းတတဲ့ည)	Safe

=== Week 3: Top 8 – Duet songs ===
Poe Mi was saved by judges. So there was no elimination in this week.
Color key:

Female contestant
Male contestant

Order	Contestants and results				Duet songs (Burmese name)
1	Chan Nyein	Bottom 3	Yoon	Safe	"Bar Kyaung" (ဘာကြောင့်)
2	Ye Naung	Safe And Highest Votes	Poe Mi	Saved by Judges	"Ti Shi Chin A Kyaung" (တည်ရှိခြင်းအကြောင်း)
3	Zin Gyi	Bottom 3	Billy La Min Aye	Safe	"Lwe Nay Tae Sone Mat Myar" (လွဲနေတဲ့ဆုံမှတ်များ)
4	Thar Nge	Safe	Mai Mai Seng	Safe	"Lite Phat Tae Ba Wa" (လိုက်ဖက်တဲ့ဘဝ)

=== Week 4: Top 8 – Rock Music ===
Double elimination because Poe Mi was saved by judges in previous week.

Order	Contestant	Song (Burmese name)	Result
1	Poe Mi	"Chaut Khan Thwar Thaw Pin Lal Pyin" (ခြောက်ခမ်းသွားသောပင်လယ်ပြင်)	Safe
2	Chan Nyein	"A Date Bal Shi Thaw Thu" (အဓိပ္ပါယ်ရှိသောသူ)	Eliminated
3	Yoon	"Pa Hta Ma Chay Lann" (ပထမခြေလမ်း)	Eliminated
4	Thar Nge	"See Ka Rat Mee Kho Myar" (စီးကရက်မီးခိုးများ)	Safe
5	Zin Gyi	"Nya Ye Sue" (ညရဲ့ဆူး)	Safe
6	Billy La Min Aye	"Min A Twat A Thet Shin Thu" (မင်းအတွက်အသက်ရှင်သူ)	Bottom 3
7	Ye Naung	"Ko Kin" (ကိုကင်း)	Safe And Highest Votes
8	Mai Mai Seng	"Pyut Sone Thwar Mar Soe" (ပျောက်ဆုံးသွားမှာစိုး)	Safe

=== Week 5: Top 6 – Win Oo's songs ===
Order	Contestant	Song (Burmese name)	Result
1	Mai Mai Seng	"Htu Char Tae Eain Mat" (ထူးခြားတဲ့အိပ်မက်)	Bottom 3
2	Zin Gyi	"Maung Toe Cherry Myay" (မောင်တို့ချယ်ရီမြေ)	Eliminated
3	Ye Naung	"Omega" (အိုမီဂါ)	Safe
4	Poe Mi	"Tain Lwar Mo Mo Lwin" (တိမ်လွှာမို့မို့လွှင်)	Bottom 3
5	Billy La Min Aye	"Kabar Hte Ta Lal Lal" (ကမ္ဘာထဲတလည်လည်)	Safe
6	Thar Nge	"Ma Ma Moe" (မမမိုး)	Safe And Highest Votes

=== Week 6: Top 5 – Popular songs ===
Order	Contestant	Song (Burmese name)	Result
1	Thar Nge	"Makeup Ma Kyite Thaw Tha Chin Myar" (မိတ်ကပ်မကြိုက်သောသီချင်းများ)	Safe And Highest Votes
2	Billy La Min Aye	"Ta Kal So Yin A Chit Pal Lo Dal" (တကယ်ဆိုရင်အချစ်ပဲလိုတယ်)	Bottom 3
3	Ye Naung	"A Yin Ka Zat Lann Lay" (အရင်ကဇာတ်လမ်းလေး)	Eliminated
4	Mai Mai Seng	"A Chit Lo Khaw Tha Lar" (အချစ်လို့ခေါ်သလား)	Bottom 3
5	Poe Mi	"Ma Sone Thaw Lann" (မဆုံသောလမ်း)	Safe

=== Week 7: Top 4 + Wild Card winner – Blues Music ===
Double eliminated because Zin Gyi was returned by Wild Card.

Order	Contestant	Song (Burmese name)	Result
1	Poe Mi	"Thay Dan" (သေဒဏ်)	Safe
2	Thar Nge	"A Mone Myo Ye A Way Mar" (အမုန်းမြို့ရဲ့အဝေးမှာ)	Safe And Highest Votes
3	Mai Mai Seng	"Paris Myo Nae Ma Lae Naing Bu" (ပဲရစ်မြို့နဲ့မလဲနိုင်ဘူး)	Eliminated
4	Zin Gyi (wild card winner)	"A May Ye Dote Kha Ao Lay" (အမေ့ရဲ့ဒုက္ခအိုးလေး)	Returned by wild card but eliminated
5	Billy La Min Aye	"Stop !" (ရပ် !)	Bottom 3

=== Week 8: Top 3 – Strong Music ===
Order	Contestant	Song (Burmese name)	Result
1	Billy La Min Aye	"Sate Ma Nyit Nae" (စိတ်မညစ်နဲ့)	Safe
2	Poe Mi	"Yone Kyi Yar" (ယုံကြည်ရာ)	Eliminated
3	Thar Nge	"Pae Kaing" (ပဲ့ကိုင်)	Safe And Highest Votes

=== Week 9: Finale ===
The Top two performed their winner’s song Judges chose their song, and the contestants chose their own song.

Contestant	Order	First Song (Burmese name)	Order	Second Song (Burmese name)	Order	Third Song (Burmese name)	Result
Billy La Min Aye	1	"A Chit Myar Lat Saung" (အချစ်များလက်ဆောင်)	4	"Phayar Suu" (ဘုရားစူး)	6	"Lan Ka Lay" (လမ်းကလေး)	Runner-up
Thar Nge	2	"Lan Kwe" (လမ်းခွဲ)	3	"Zat Taw Hte Mar A Lwan Sone" (ဇာတ်တော်ထဲမှာအလွမ်းဆုံး)	5	"Lan Ka Lay" (လမ်းကလေး)	Winner

== Elimination Chart ==
Order	Contestant	Top 10	Top 9	Top 8	Top 8	Top 6	Top 5	Top 4+1	Top 3	Finale
1	Thar Nge	Safe	Safe	Safe	Safe	Highest Votes	Highest Votes	Highest Votes	Highest Votes	Winner
2	Billy La Min Aye	Safe	Safe	Safe	Bottom 3	Safe	Bottom 3	Bottom 3	Safe	Runner-up
3	Poe Mi	Bottom 3	Safe	Saved by judges	Safe	Bottom 3	Safe	Safe	Eliminated	
4	Mai Mai Seng	Safe	Bottom 3	Safe	Safe	Bottom 3	Bottom 3	Eliminated		
5	Zin Gyi	Bottom 3	Safe	Bottom 3	Safe	Eliminated		Returned by Wild Card and eliminated		
6	Ye Naung	Highest Votes	Highest Votes	Highest Votes	Highest Votes	Safe	Eliminated			
7	Chan Nyein	Safe	Safe	Bottom 3	Eliminated					
8	Yoon	Safe	Bottom 3	Safe	Eliminated					
9	Phyu Lay	Safe	Eliminated							
10	A Mi Zan	Eliminated								
