= Maung Mu Paing Shin (2000 film) =

- Film poster
- Burmese: မောင့်မူပိုင်ရှင်
- Directed by: Ko San Aung
- Starring: Dwe; Lwin Moe; Htun Eaindra Bo; Htet Htet Moe Oo
- Music by: Dwe; Htun Eaindra Bo; Si Thu Lwin
- Release date: 2000
- Running time: 120 minutes
- Country: Myanmar
- Language: Burmese

Maung Mu Paing Shin (Burmese: မောင့်မူပိုင်ရှင်) is a 2000 Burmese musical drama romance film directed by Ko San Aung. The film stars Dwe, Lwin Moe, Htun Eaindra Bo and Htet Htet Moe Oo in the lead roles. This is the first and last film made by advertising director Ko San Aung, because he died unexpectedly near the cinema. The film is a remake of the 1964 black-and-white film of the same name.

At the 2000 Myanmar Academy Awards Presentation Ceremony, the film won Best Cinematography Award for Than Nyunt(Pan Tha).

== Cast ==
- Dwe as Myint Zaw
- Lwin Moe as Moe Lwin
- Htun Eaindra Bo as Ma Ma Khine
- Htet Htet Moe Oo as Nyein
- Myint Myint Khin as Daw Myint Myint, mother of Myint Zaw
- Saw Naing as U Thite Htun, father of Ma Ma Khine
- Kutho as Kutho
- Thu Maung (Cameo)
- Si Thu Lwin (Cameo)
