= John Lwin =

Burmese model and activist (born 1967)

- ဂျွန်လွင်
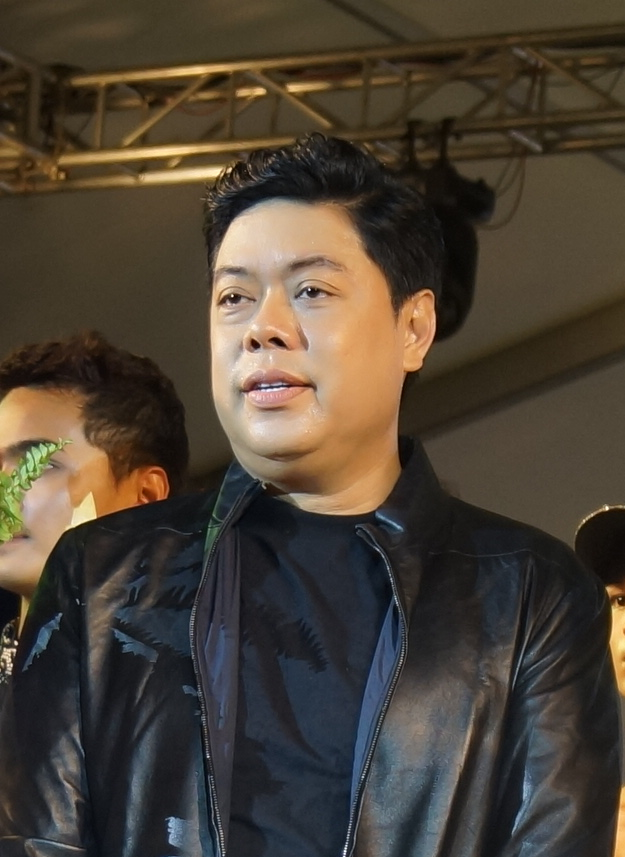
- Lwin at Myanmar International Fashion Week 2016
- Born: Tin Aung Lwin; 15 July 1967 (age 59); Yangon, Burma
- Education: Rangoon University
- Occupations: Model; event organizer; LGBT rights activist
- Years active: 1989–present
- Height: 5 ft 11 in (1.80 m)
- Parents: Hla Myint (father); Mya Mya Aye (mother)

John Lwin (Burmese: ဂျွန်လွင်; born Tin Aung Lwin on 15 July 1967) is a former Burmese model, model agency founder, event organizer, and LGBT rights activist. After being model scouted at a young age while living in Singapore, he enjoyed a successful career, modelling in Southeast Asia between 1989 and 1995, from Hong Kong to the Philippines. He has discovered and trained more than 200 models and 30 actors.

He is the founder and CEO of Stars & Models International, Myanmar's first modelling agency and Star Event Production which has been organizing major concerts and Myanmar International Fashion Week. He has mentored many successful models and actors and introduced professional standards to Myanmar's modeling industry.

== Early life and education ==
Lwin was born on 15 July 1967 in Yangon, Myanmar. He is the youngest son of Hla Myint, a retired chief railway engineer in the Myanmar Rail Transportation Corporation, and his wife Mya Mya Aye, a former school teacher. He has an elder brother Aung Moe Kyaw, a businessman and CEO of International Beverages and Trading Company Limited (IBTC). He graduated high school from Basic Education High School No. 2 Bahan. He then enrolled at the Rangoon University and graduated with a degree in Zoology and also studied hotel management in Singapore.

== Career ==
In 1989, he moved to Singapore from Yangon to study hotel management. After, he joined Carrie Models International, a local modelling agency. Since then, he took professional training in modelling and catwalk. He was the only Burmese model in Singapore at that time. In 1992, he won the title of Singapore's "Face of the Year". Afterwards, he worked with brand companies from Bangkok and Kuala Lumpur to appear in commercials for brands such as Nescafé.

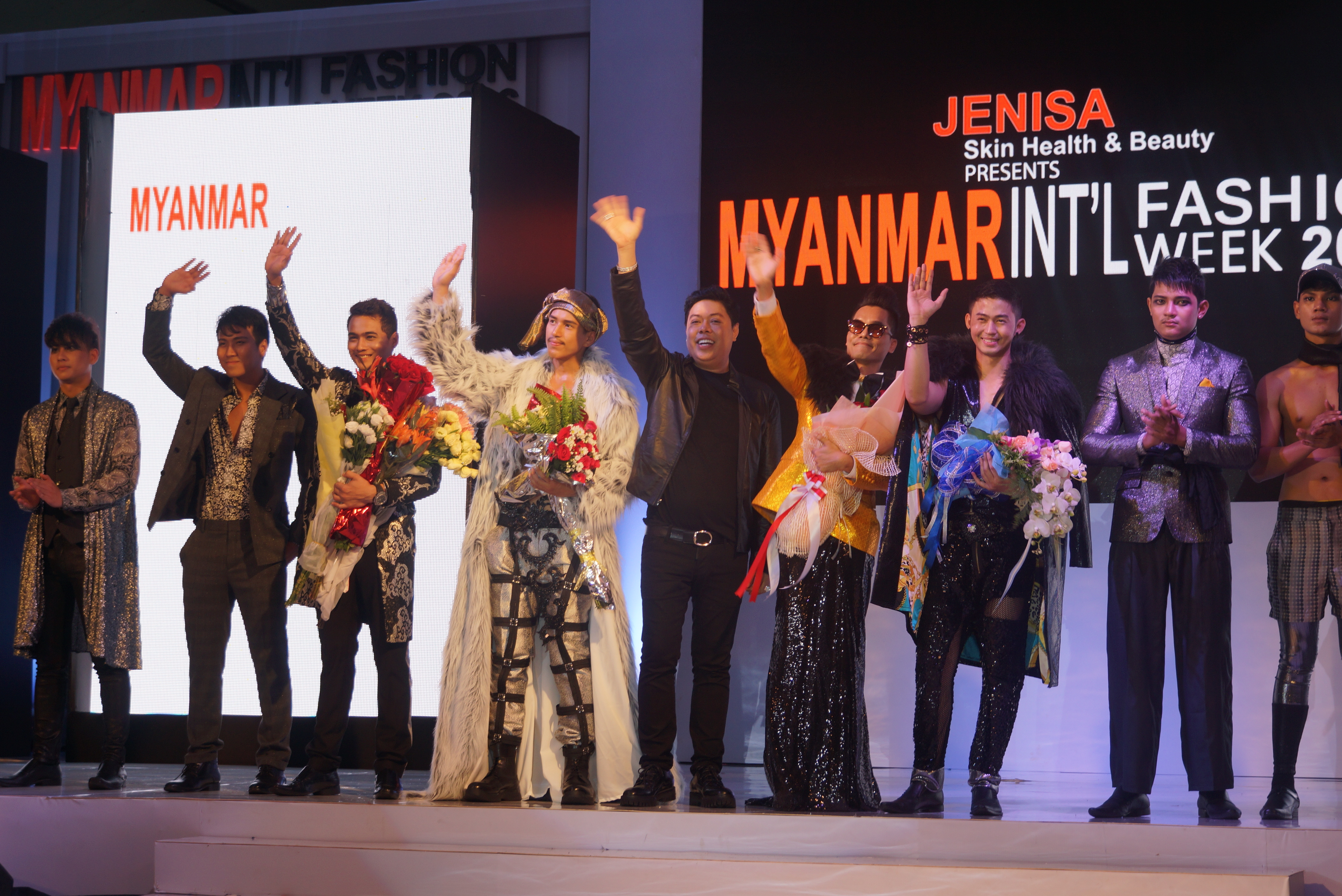
John Lwin successfully ending off Myanmar International Fashion Week 2016 with designers and actors

In 1995, he moved back to Yangon and founded the country's first modeling agency named Stars & Models International and he has discovered and produced more than 200 models and 30 actors, including: Sai Sai Kham Leng, Moe Hay Ko, Myint Myat, Aung Ye Lin, Yu Thandar Tin, San Yati Moe Myint, Shwe Hmone Yati, Aung Min Khant, Paing Takhon, and many others.

Afterwards, he agreed to set up Myanmar Asia Trading, which involved exporting male fashion wear from Myanmar to Singapore. His network of contacts in the fashion industry expanded and he was invited to organize Myanmar's first fashion show in 1995. In 1998, he founded Star Event Production which arranged the first MTV Exit Live in Myanmar at People Square. He has plans for 300-400 events per year, including music concerts, Myanmar Women's Day Ceremony, Grand Royal Concert, the L'Oréal red carpet, Myanmar International Fashion Week and Myanmar Academy Awards Ceremony.

In December 2013, he acquired the copyright of Manhunt International, to enable Myanmar's male models to compete internationally. In 2016, he received "Best Event Organizer Award" at the Shwe FM 7th Anniversary Awards. From 2016 to 2018, he also helped the government organise and host the Myanmar Academy Awards Ceremony.

== LGBT rights activism ==
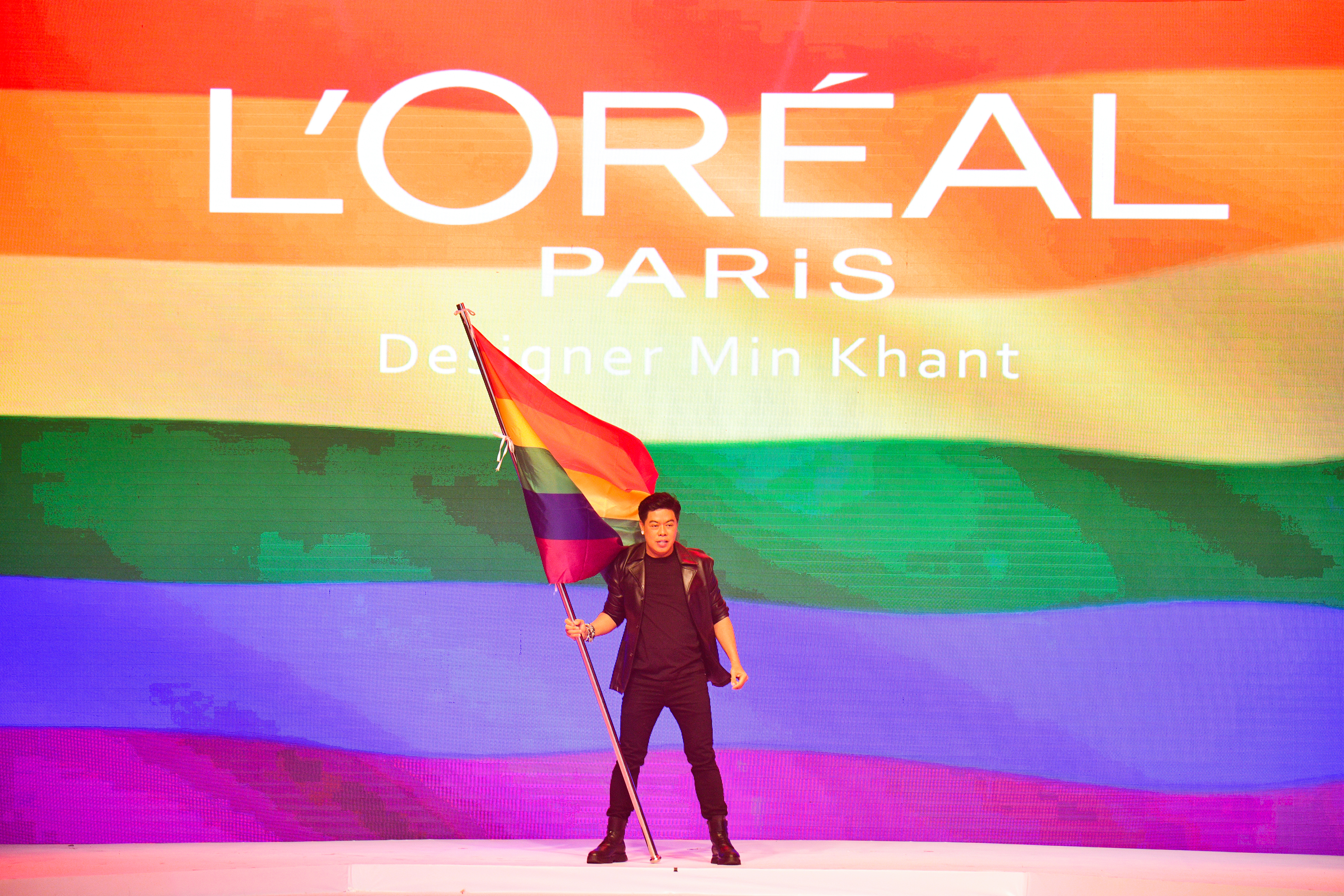
John Lwin is walking the runway by holding the rainbow flag at the L'Oréal red carpet galas in Myanmar

Lwin is a supporter of the LGBT rights in Myanmar, he actively participated in many LGBT rights campaigns in Yangon. He is lobbying for the abolishing of Article 377 of Myanmar's Penal Code. He believes that in order to achieve equality, the government should take responsibility for ensuring that LGBT people are represented in every sector.

On 5 July 2019, he has walked the runway by holding the rainbow flag at the L'Oréal red carpet gala in Myanmar with the aim of standing for the oppressed LGBT.

== Arrest ==
John Lwin was arrested after returning from Bangkok on 4 June 2025. His arrest followed social media posts in which he criticized actress Khine Hnin Wai over a controversy involving a mistaken bank transfer. Many activists have claimed that criticizing Khine Hnin Wai can lead to imprisonment, as she is allegedly protected by the military junta and considered untouchable. He was also allegedly involved in reselling products from singer Chan Chan, who fled to Italy due to her political activism. Under recent laws in Myanmar, purchasing or distributing products associated with anti-junta activists abroad is considered a criminal offense.
