= Stranger's House =

2019 Burmese thriller film

- Theatrical poster
- Burmese: သူစိမ်းအိမ်
- Directed by: Htoo Paing Zaw Oo
- Written by: Good Old Days Flim; Kham Mon
- Screenplay by: Kham Mon
- Produced by: Good Old Days
- Starring: Lwin Moe; Htun Eaindra Bo; Phway Phway; Ku Ku Zin Aung; Myat Noe Aye
- Cinematography: Maung Maung Tha Myint
- Edited by: Swe Swe Htun
- Production company: Good Old Days
- Distributed by: Good Old Days
- Release date: August 1, 2019
- Running time: 120 minutes
- Country: Myanmar
- Language: Burmese

Stranger's House (Burmese: သူစိမ်းအိမ်) is a 2019 Burmese psychological thriller film starring Lwin Moe, Htun Eaindra Bo and Phway Phway. The film produced and distributed by Good Old Days Production premiered in Myanmar on August 1, 2019.

== Synopsis ==
Mandalay residents Nway Oo and Kay Thi arrived at their online friend Mya's house while visiting Rangoon. On first impression, Mya's family appeared to be one happy and harmonious family. However, as time went on, terrifying incidents started to became more apparent. Nway Oo and Kay Thi soon discovered that it was the house of a psychiatric family and must find a way to escape fast. But by the time they realized, it was already too late.

== Cast ==
- Lwin Moe as U Nay Aung
- Htun Eaindra Bo as Daw Yin Yin, wife of U Nay Aung
- Phway Phway as Nway Oo
- Ku Ku Zin Aung as Mya, daughter of U Nay Aung
- Myat Noe Aye as Kay Thi
- Charli as Myo Thit
- Lin Zarni Zaw as Daw Wai Wai
- Shein Tin Htoo as Shein
- Joker as The Neighbor
