= Chan Chan (singer) =

Burmese singer and model

Chan Chan (ချမ်းချမ်း)
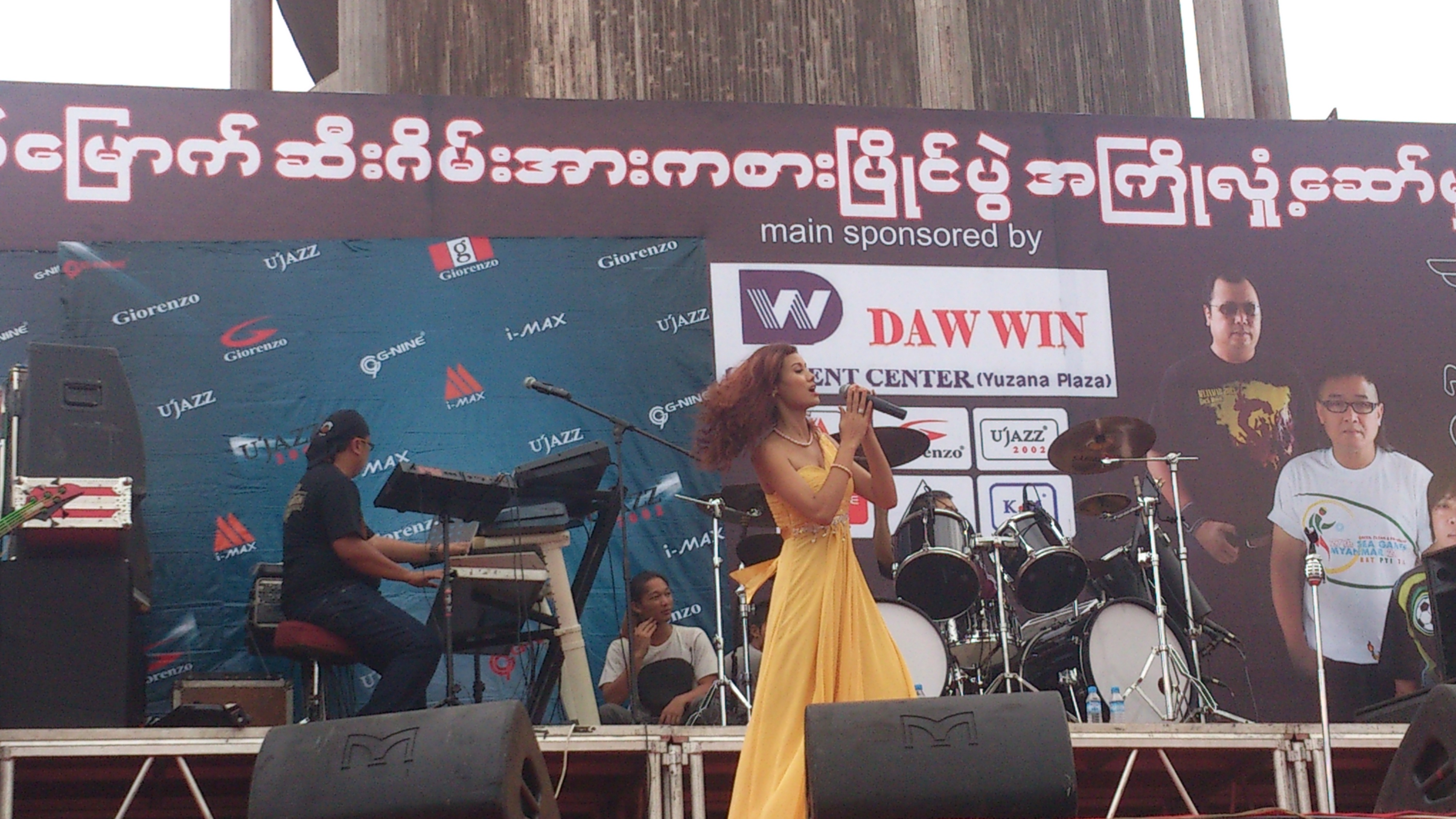
- Chan Chan performing in May 2013 at Pyin Oo Lwin

Background information
- Born: Chan Mya Nyein (ချမ်းမြငြိမ်း); Rangoon, Burma
- Genres: Pop, pop rock, R&B
- Occupations: Singer-songwriter, model
- Instruments: Vocals, harmonica

Chan Mya Nyein (Burmese: ချမ်းမြငြိမ်း; born 1987 in Yangon) is a Burmese singer and model known professionally as Chan Chan (ချမ်းချမ်း). She has released three solo albums to date. She was also one of the judges in Myanmar Idol.

== Career ==
Chan Chan began her show business career in 2007 when she won second place in the Melody World singing contest on Myawaddy TV. Her winning song, "Thachin Letsaung" is one of the tracks included in the album named The Best of Melody World 2007. "Thachin Letsaung" became her debut song and gained her extra fame as a singer in Myanmar

Chan Chan released her first album, Tage So Yin Achit Be Lo De, shortly after winning the Melody World contest. "Love Is All We Need Indeed" (တကယ်ဆိုရင်အချစ်ပဲလိုတယ်), the hit song of this album is the cover version of a famous Chinese song. She was awarded "Best-selling album – Female" by City FM in 2010. In 2011, she was titled the "Most popular female singer of the year" by City FM. Her second album Theik Chit De, Ayan Mon De was released in early 2012. In 2013, she won the 'People's Choice Award' and 'First Runner-up' in People Magazine modelling contest.

From 2015 to 2016, she participated as a judge in the 1st season of Myanmar Idol. Between June and July 2019, she held a United States tour through the main cities of the country.

== Brand ambassadorship ==
She represented the Paul Mitchell hairstyle products brand in 2009, and the Brand Ambassador for Banchack Lubricant in Thailand.

== Political activities ==
On 2 April 2021, in the aftermath of the 2021 Myanmar coup d'état, an arrest warrant was issued to her under section 505 (a) of the Myanmar Penal Code by the State Administration Council for speaking out against the military coup. Along with several other celebrities, she was charged with calling for participation in the Civil Disobedience Movement (CDM) and damaging the state's ability to govern, with supporting the Committee Representing Pyidaungsu Hluttaw, and with generally inciting the people to disturb the peace and stability of the nation. She requested permission for ethnic armed groups to enter the cities openly in order to protect the people who are striving to make the anti-junta protest successful.

On 19 February 2022, her homes and business property were confiscated by the military council. She held a concert series called "Chan Chan Australia Tour 2023" in several Australian cities—including Sydney, Melbourne, Perth, Brisbane, and Adelaide—to raise funds for the people of Myanmar affected by the civil war. In September 2024, Chan Chan held a series of charity concerts across major cities in Japan to raise funds for humanitarian aid and support for flood-affected communities in Myanmar.

In June 2025, the military council announced that purchasing or distributing products linked to Chan Chan and other anti-junta activists abroad would be considered a criminal offense. Three people, including influential figure John Lwin, were arrested for allegedly distributing products associated with Chan Chan.

== Personal life ==
Chan Chan is the youngest daughter out of 4 siblings. She married Phone Thaik (ဘုဏ်းသိုက်) on 17 July 2013 at Saint Mary's Cathedral in Botahtaung Township, Yangon. They divorced in 2017, and have one daughter. She is currently married to Enrico, an Italian businessman, with whom she has two daughters. She is based in Italy.

== Discography ==
- Ta Kal So Yin A Chit Pal Lo Tal (တကယ်ဆိုရင် အချစ်ပဲလိုတယ်) (2010)
- Thape Chit Tal, A Yann Mone Tal (သိပ်ချစ်တယ် အရမ်းမုန်းတယ်) (2012)
- Eain Met (အိပ်မက်) (2014)
- Tho Chit Nay Tone Bal (သို့.... ချစ်နေတုန်းပဲ) (2017)
