= Thamee Mite =

2001 Burmese Film

- poster
- Burmese: သမီးမိုက်
- Directed by: Khin Maung Oo & Soe Thein Htut
- Screenplay by: Khin Maung Oo & Soe Thein Htut
- Story by: Mi Ko Zu Zin
- Starring: Lwin Moe; Htet Htet Moe Oo
- Edited by: Zaw Min (Hanthar Myay)
- Production company: Lu Swan Kaung Film Production
- Release date: 2001
- Running time: 135 minutes
- Country: Myanmar
- Language: Burmese

Thamee Mite (Burmese: သမီးမိုက်) is a 2001 Burmese drama film directed by Khin Maung Oo & Soe Thein Htut. Htet Htet Moe acted in dual role as Mother and her daughter in this film. Htet Htet Moe Oo won the Best Actress Award in 2001 Myanmar Motion Picture Academy Awards.

== Cast ==
- Lwin Moe as Thaw Oo
- Htet Htet Moe Oo in dual role as May Myat Noe and her daughter; Shwe Eain Soe
- Ya Wai Aung as Khun Sett
- May Than Nu as Daw May Myat, Mother of May Myat Noe
- Zaw Oo as Father of May Myat Noe
- Myint Myint Khine as Daw May Thi, Mother of Thaw Oo
- Myat Kay Thi Aung as May Mi, Sister of Thaw Oo
- Goon Pone as Phway Phway

== Award ==
| Year | Award | Category | Nominee | Result |
|---|---|---|---|---|
| 2001 | Myanmar Motion Picture Academy Awards | Best Actress | Htet Htet Moe Oo | Won |
