= Myanmar Idol =

- Created by: Simon Fuller
- Presented by: Kyaw Htet Aung
- Judges: Ye Lay; Chan Chan; May Sweet; Myanmar Pyi Thein Tan; Tin Zar Maw; Yan Aung; Myo Kyawt Myaing; Aung Ko Latt; Phyu Phyu Kyaw Thein
- Theme music composer: Ye Lay
- Opening theme: "Be Happy, Friends" (ပျော်ပါစေသူငယ်ချင်း)
- Original language: Burmese
- No. of seasons: 4

Original release
- Network: MNTV; Channel 9 (Season 4)
- Release: 11 December 2015 – present

Myanmar Idol is a Myanmar singing contest television series that is broadcast on MNTV. Its first season, in 2015, was described by The Myanmar Times as a "wild success". Due to its popularity, it has been extended for a fifth season in 2020. Since Season 3, the competition format has utilized a wild card during the top 4+1 show.

== Judges ==
- Ye Lay (1)
- Chan Chan (1)
- May Sweet (1, 2)
- Myanmar Pyi Thein Tan (2, 3)
- Tin Zar Maw (2, 3, 4)
- Yan Aung (3)
- Myo Kyawt Myaing (3)
- Aung Ko Latt (4)
- Phyu Phyu Kyaw Thein (4)

== Winners ==
- Saw Lah Htaw Wah (Season 1)
- Thar Nge (Season 2)
- Phyo Myat Aung (Season 3)
- Esther Dawt Chin Sung (Season 4)

== Episodes ==
Season 1

Season 2

Season 3

Season 4

== Series overview ==
Following the success of American Idol and other IDOL series, Shwe Thanlwin created a Myanmar version of the series with identical formats and methods. Broadcast on Myanmar Network TV on Sky Net, it grew to be more popular than Dream Encounters (အိပ်မက်ဆုံရာ) and Melody World, which were once the most popular singing competition series in Myanmar.

=== Host and judges ===
The inaugural season of Myanmar Idol featured 3 judges: Burmese singers Ye Lay, Chan Chan and May Sweet. Since then, various combinations of 3 to 4 judges, including Tin Zar Maw, Myo Kyawt Myaing, Myanmar Pyi Thein Tan, Yan Aung, Aung Ko Latt, and Phyu Phyu Kyaw Thein, have served in the judge panel. The show has been hosted by Kyaw Htet Aung since Season 1.

Hosts / Judges	Seasons			
Hosts / Judges	1 (2015-2016)	2 (2016-2017)	3 (2018)	4 (2019)
Hosts
Kyaw Htet Aung				
Judges
Chan Chan				
Ye Lay				
May Sweet				
Myanmar Pyi Thein Than				
Tin Zar Maw				
Myo Kyawt Myaing				
Yan Aung				
Aung Ko Latt				
Phyu Phyu Kyaw Thein				

=== Season 1 ===
In 2015, the first Myanmar Idol season held auditions in four major cities: Yangon, Mandalay, Pathein and Taunggyi. The series judges, Ye Lay, Chan Chan and May Sweet chose the Top 11 finalists. After further stages, the Top 3 finalists, Saw Lah Htaw Wah, M Zaw Rain and Hninzi May advanced to the Grand Final Show, where Saw Lah Htaw Wah became Myanmar Idol winner of the first season.

=== Season 2 ===
Season 2, in 2016, featured Tin Zar Maw, Myanmar Pyi Thein Tan and May Sweet as judges; with auditions held in 5 major cities, Yangon, Mandalay, Naypyidaw, Taunggyi and Hpa-An, and bus auditions also held in other towns. Later in the series, the judges decided who would be in the Final Top 10, and, after further stages, the series advanced to the Grand Final Show held on 25 March 2017, where the two finalists, Thar Nge and Billy La Min Aye, competed with three songs. With the voting results of the whole country counted, Thar Nge was announced winner of the second season.

=== Season 3 ===
During Season 3, in 2018, two new judges, Yan Aung and Myo Kyawt Myaing, joined Myanmar Pyi Thein Tan and Tin Zar Maw. After progressing to the Grand Final, ChanMyae MgCho was unable to participate due to illness. Phyo Myat Aung won the third season of Myanmar Idol. Zawgyi came back a wild card during the semi-finals.

Top 11 Finalists are Phyo Myat Aung, ChanMyae MgCho, Zaw Gyi, Ngwe Zin Hlaing, Nay Khant Min Thit, Nilen Parmawi, May Madi, Pyae Phyo, Naw Jas, Nan Shwe Yee, Swan Pyae Aung.

=== Season 4 ===
Season 4 of Myanmar Idol was aired on Channel 9. The judges were Tin Zar Maw, Phyu Phyu Kyaw Thein and Aung Ko Latt. Benjamin Sum, Aye Mya Phyu, Esther Dawt Chin Sung, Yaw Kee, Htet Inzali, Naw Say Say Htoo, Nay Lin Kyaw, Chuu Sitt Han, Hninn Ei Ei Win, Tan Khun Kyaw and Saw Chris Moo Ler are the top 11 finalists. Tan Khun Kyaw returned to the semi-finals with the Channel-9 wild card. Chu Sit Han, Nay Lin Kyaw, Hninn Ei Ei Win, Tan Khun Kyaw, Htet Inzali, Naw Say Say Htoo and Yaw Kee were nominated for the Channel 9 Wild Card. The finalists were Benjamin Sum, Aye Mya Phyu and Esther Dawt Chin Sung to complete the grand final. The grand final (as usual) was located in Hexagon Complex, and voting was available after the top 4+1 result show from that day (20-12-2019) to (28-12-2019) and the GRAND FINAL was aired in Channel 9 and the time was 20:30. Esther Dawt Chin Sung won the fourth season of Myanmar Idol and the first girl winner of Myanmar Idol.

== Season details ==
Season	Year	Finale date	Winner	Runner Up(s)	Other contestants	Number of contestants
1	2015-2016	8 April 2016	Saw Lah Htaw Wah	M Zaw Rain, Hnin Zi May	Sophia Everest, Zaw Min Oo, Saw Htet Naing Soe, May Kyi, Aung Tayza Kyaw, Khine Thazin Thin, Aung Pyae Tun, Rio	11
2	2016-2017	25 March 2017	Thar Nge	Billy La Min Aye	Poe Mi, Mai Mai Seng, Ye Naung, Zin Gyi, Chan Nyein, Yoon, Phyu Lay, A Mi Zan	10
3	2018	11 August 2018	Phyo Myat Aung	ChanMyae MgCho	Nan Shwe Yee, Swan Pyae Aung, Nilen, Ngwe Zin Hlaing, Naw Jas, May Madi, Pyae Phyo, Zawgyi, Nay Khant Min Thit	11
4	2019	28 December 2019	Esther Dawt Chin Sung	Aye Mya Phyu, Benjamin Sum	Moo Ler, Nay Lin Kyaw, Hnin Ei Ei Win, Htet Inzali, Chu Sit Han, Tan Khun Kyaw, Naw Say Say Htoo, Yaw Kee	11

== Finalists ==
Finalists (With Final Competition)
Season 1	(2015–16)	Final Competition Week	Last Competition Song(s)	Remark	Audition	Voting Number
Saw Lah Htaw Wah	Winner	Grand Final	1. Du Ta Ya; 2. Min Thi Naing Ma Lar; 3. Dan Yar Maet A Nar		Yangon	7
M Zaw Rain	Runner Up	Grand Final	1. Nout Sone Yin Kwin; 2. Min Thi Naing Ma Lar; 3. A Chit Oo Zat Lan		Taunggyi	1
Ninzi May	Runner Up	Grand Final	1. A Chit Htat Ma Ka; 2. Min Thi Naing Ma Lar; 3. Bal Thu Koe Lout Chit Tha Lal		Yangon	3
Sophia Everest		Top 4 +1: Composer Saung Oo Hlaing's Songs Week	A Chit Ma Shi Nay Yat Myar	She was saved by judges in No. 1 Hit Songs Week.; Double eliminations because May Kyi came back with Pantene Wild Card in Cinematic Songs Week.	Yangon	8
Zaw Min Oo		Top 5 + 1: Cinematic Songs Week	Nha Yout Ta Ein Mat		Mandalay	11
Saw Htet Naing Soe		Top 6: Summer Season Songs Week	Nway Mhat Tan		Taunggyi	2
May Kyi		Top 4 + 1: Composer Saung Oo Hlaing's Songs Week (with Pantene Wild Card)	A Mharr Myarr	Double eliminations because she came back with Pantene Wild Card in Cinematic Songs Week.	Taunggyi	10
May Kyi		Top 7: Rock Week	A Twin Kyay	She was Pantene Wild Card Winner and came back in Cinematic Songs Week.	Taunggyi	10
Aung Tay Zar Kyaw		Top 8 + 1: Htoo Ein Thin's Songs Week	Yar Za Win Myar Yae Tha Doe Tha Mee	Double eliminations because Sophia Everest was saved by judges in No. 1 Hit Songs Week.	Mawlamyine	9
Khine Thazin Thin		Top 8 + 1: Htoo Ein Thin's Songs Week	Nar Yee Paw Mha Myat Yae Sat Myar	Double eliminations because Sophia Everest was saved by judges in No. 1 Hit Songs Week.	Yangon	6
		Top 9: No. 1 Hit Songs Week		No elimination because Sophia Everest was saved by judges.		
Aung Pyae Tun		Top 10: Famous Songs of 1980 Week	Pyout Sone Nay Thaw Naitban Bone		Mandalay	4
Rio		Top 11: Favourite Songs Week	Thu Nge Chin A Twat		Yangon	5
Season 2	(2016–17)	Final Competition Week	Last Competition Song(s)	Remark	Audition	Voting Number
Thar Nge	Winner	Grand Final	1. D Lan Ka Lay; 2. Lan Kwel; 3. Zat Taw Htel Mhar A Lwan Sone		Mandalay	2
Billy La Min Aye	Runner Up	Grand Final	1. D Lan Ka Lay; 2. Phayar Suu; 3. A Chit Myar Lat Saung		Taunggyi	9
Poe Mi		Top 3: Encouraging Songs Week	Yone Kyi Yar	She was saved by judges in Duet Songs Week.	Yangon	6
Mai Mai Seng		Top 4 + 1: Blue Music Week	Paris Myo Ko Pyan U Twar	Double eliminations because Zin Gyi came back with Pantene Wild Card.	Mandalay	4
Ye Naung		Top 5: No. 1 Hit Songs Week	A Yin Ka Zat Lan Lay		Yangon	1
Zin Gyi		Top 4 + 1: Blue Music Week (with Pantene Wild Card)	A May Yal Dokka Ow Lay	Double eliminations because he came back with Pantene Wild Card. But he was eliminated again in the same week.	Taunggyi	3
Zin Gyi		Top 6: Academy Win Oo Week	Maung Toe Chal Yi Myay	*Golden Disc (May Sweet) Winner; He was Pantene Wild Card winner and came back in Blue Music Week.	Taunggyi	3
Chan Nyein		Top 7 + 1: Back to Rock Week	A Dade Pae Shi Taw Thu	Double eliminations because Poe Mi was saved by judges in Duet Songs Week.	Yangon	5
Yoon		Top 7 + 1: Back to Rock Week	Pa Hta Ma Chay Hlenn	Double eliminations because Poe Mi was saved by judges in Duet Songs Week.	Taunggyi	10
		Top 8: Duet Songs Week		No elimination because Poe Mi was saved by judges.		
Phyu Lay		Top 9: Famous Songs of 1990 Week	25 Minutes		Mandalay	8
A Mi Zan		Top 10: Favourite Songs Week	Myaw Lint Chin Kwin Pyin		Hpa-An	7
Season 3	(2018)	Final Competition Week	Last Competition Song(s)	Remark	Audition	Voting Number
Phyo Myat Aung	Winner	Grand Final	1. Nhoat Sat Chain; 2. Ma Ma Ko Chit Tal; 3. Tint A Twat Ma Nat Phyan		Pathein	7
ChanMyae MgCho		Grand Final	1. Tint A Twat Ma Nat Phyan	Withdrew from competition on Grand Final due to health problem	Yangon	11
Nay Khant Min Thit		Top 4 + 1: Jazz Week	Thu A Twat Tay Kabyar	He was saved by judges in Latin Week.; Double eliminations because Zaw Gyi came back with Pantene Wild Card.	Yangon	10
Ngwe Zin Hline		Top 4 + 1: Jazz Week	Inya Mhar Sone Soe Kwel	Double eliminations because Zaw Gyi came back with Pantene Wild Card.	Yangon	4
Zaw Gyi		Top 3: Hit Songs and Duet with Star Week (with Pantene Wild Card)	1. Lo Tha Lo Thone; 2. Ta Yout Htal Ngo Mel (with Jewel)		Yangon	9
Zaw Gyi		Top 5 + 1: Rock Week	Arr Lone Pyan Yuu Thwar Par	Double eliminations because Nay Khant Min Thit was saved by judges in Latin Week.; He was Pantene Wild Card winner and came back in Jazz Week.	Yangon	9
Nilen Parmawi		Top 5 + 1: Rock Week	Tate Pine Tae Minn	Double eliminations because Nay Khant Min Thit was saved by judges in Latin Week.	Yangon	3
		Top 6: Latin Week		No elimination because Nay Khant Min Thit was saved by judges.		
May Madi		Top 7: Raining Season Songs Week	Moe Thae Htae Mhar		Taunggyi	6
Pyae Phyo		Top 8: Khine Htoo Week	Hnin Wai Tae Saung		Yangon	8
Nan Shwe Yee		Top 10: Retro Night Week	Eait Say Ma Shi	Double eliminations	Yangon	1
Naw Jasmine		Top 10: Retro Night Week	Htein Choke Thu	Double eliminations	Yangon	5
Swan Pyae Aung		Top 11: My Idol Week	A Mone Phwe Tay		Mandalay	2
Season 4	(2019)	Final Competition Week	Last Competition Song(s)	Remark	Audition	Voting Number
Esther Dawt Chin Sung	Winner	Grand Final	1. Cin Sarr Mhar Pop; 2. Thit Sar Ma Pyat Kyay; 3. A Phyu Yaung		Yangon	8
Aye Mya Phyu	Runner Up	Grand Final	1. Lar Mae Nhit Mhar Yee Sar Htarr Mel; 2. Pin Tine San A Twet A Chit Yae A Lin Yaung; 3. A Phyu Yaung		Yangon	11
Benjamin Sum	Runner Up	Grand Final	1. Ma Ma Chit Lo Ma Pyit; 2. Mask (Myet Nhar Phone); 3. A Phyu Yaung		Yangon	2
Moo Ler		Top 4 +1: Cinematic Songs and Encouraging Songs Week	1. Ma Pyoe Thi Moe; 2. Tan Ma Ni Late Pyar (Iron Butterfly)	Double eliminations because Tan Khun Kyaw came back with Channel 9 Wild Card.	Yangon	10
Yaw Kee		Top 5: No. 1 Hit Songs Week	Ma Shi Taut Buu		Yangon	1
Naw Say Say Htoo		Top 6: Winter Season Songs Week	Saung Eain Mat	She was saved by judges in Rock Week.	Hpa-An	3
Htet Inzali		Top 7: Soe Lwin Lwin Week	Nge Nge Tone Ka Htet Po Chit Mae		Yangon	6
Tan Khun Kyaw		Top 4 +1: Cinematic Songs and Encouraging Songs Week (with Channel 9 Wild Card)	1. Ta Pyi Thu Ma Shwe Htar; 2. Kabar Myay Nyein Chan Par Say	Double eliminations because he came back with Channel 9 Wild Card. But he was eliminated again in the same week.	Mandalay	4
Tan Khun Kyaw		Top 8: Country Week	Yangon Thar	He was Channel 9 Wild Card winner and came back in Cinematic Songs and Encouraging Songs Week.	Mandalay	4
Hnin Ei Ei Win		Top 9 + 1: Yangon University Songs Week	Ta Chain Tone Ca Tet Ka Tho	Double eliminations because Naw Say Say Htoo was saved by judges.	Yangon	7
Nay Lin Kyaw		Top 9 + 1: Yangon University Songs Week	Kant Kaw Wai Da Nar	Double eliminations because Naw Say Say Htoo was saved by judges.	Yangon	9
		Top 10: Rock Week		No elimination because Naw Say Say Htoo was saved by judges.		
Chuu Sitt Han		Top 11: Favourite Songs Week	Cherry Lenn		Yangon	5
