= Phyo Myat Aung =

Burmese singer (born 1992)

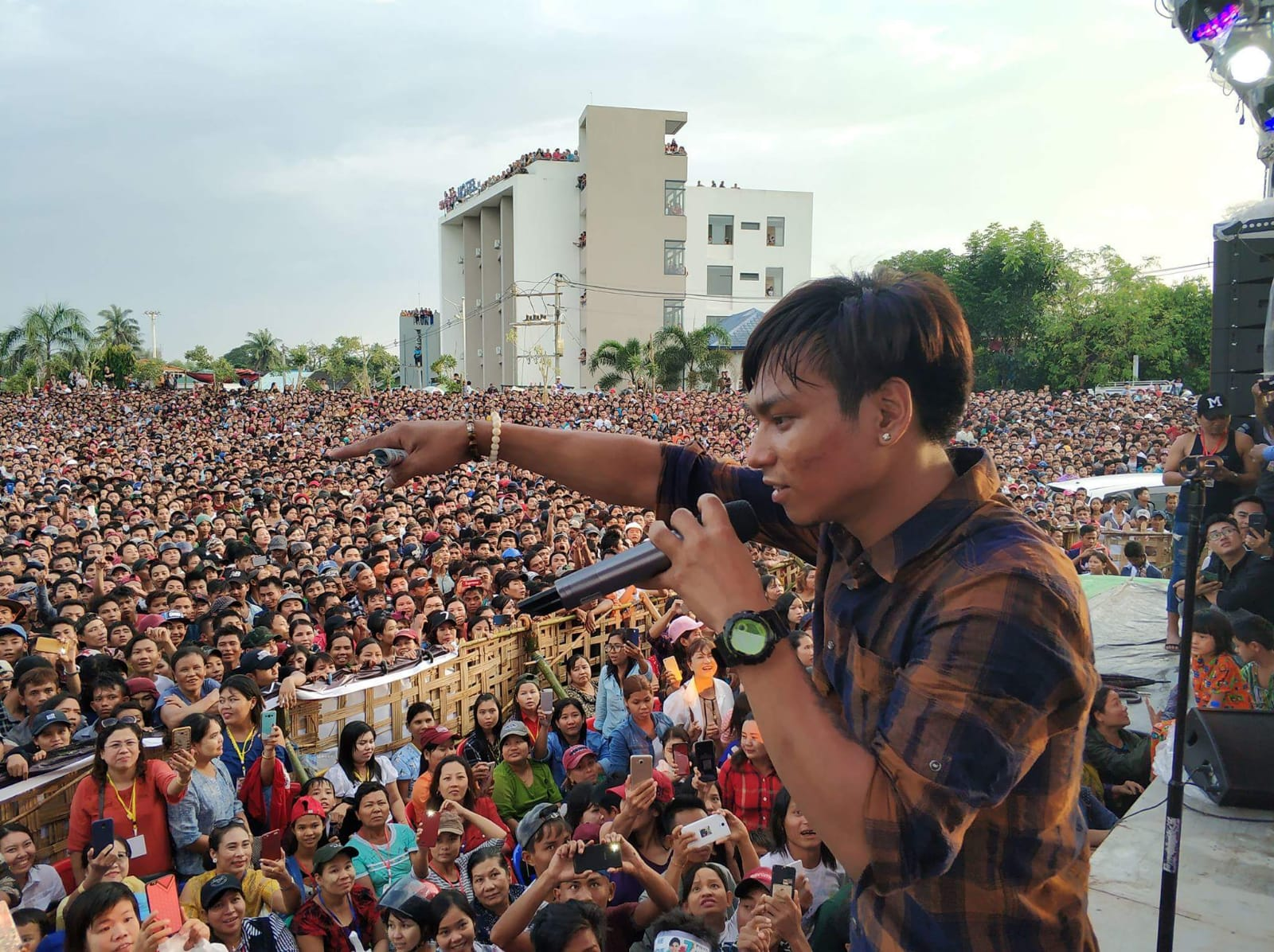
- Phyo Myat Aung performing at Hinthada

Background information
- Birth name: Phyo Myat Aung
- Born: 9 July 1992 (age 32); Hinthada, Ayeyarwady Region, Myanmar
- Genres: Rock, Pop
- Occupation: Singer-songwriter
- Years active: 2018–present

Phyo Myat Aung (Burmese: ဖြိုးမြတ်အောင်; born 9 July 1992) is a Burmese singer who gained national attention for winning the third season of Myanmar Idol.

== Early life and family ==
Phyo Myat Aung was born on 9 July 1992 in Hinthada, Ayeyarwady Region, Myanmar. Born to an amateur musical family in a district town in Ayeyarwady delta, he was not a stranger to music since he was young. His father was an amateur traditional guitar player and his mother was an amateur singer. His maternal grandfather was a traditional trumpet player.

== Career ==
=== Beginning and competition ===
Phyo Myat Aung started singing mono songs along with his parents in street performances since he was 8 years old. At the age of ten, he was introduced Rock music by one of his uncles and he fell in love with this genre instantly. Since then he inspired to become a rock singer. The adolescent years were very harsh for him as the family fell into financial hardship. He used to have just a pair of school uniform and even barely had meals during lunch time. Those unfortunate things led him into engaging street fights. He finally ended his education as a high school dropout.

Despite those spiral-downward personal hardship, his affection to music and inspiration to become a singer had never gone away. He started stage singing with a local band in the vicinity of his home town since he was 14. He adopted a stage-name Agni which means ‘born from fire’ to echo his harsh life. He had limited success with his local band and performed in various local events. But he barely made living by his singing career and faced immense pressure to abandon his passion of singing and start a more stable career as a driver, etc. He faced many backlashes in social and professional life due to his relatively poor social and financial background.

He ordained into monkshood following the tradition of a Burmese male. This made him to expose more to the teaching of Buddha about life, and refresh thoughts about his life and ambitions. He changed his way of life gradually since then.

A breakthrough moment came when a friend suggested to enter audition for Myanmar Idol Season 3. He borrowed money to travel to a nearby town for Myanmar Idol audition. He was the first contestant from that audition session to go for the next level of competition. He passed through several stages of the competition to become one of Top 11 finalists.

His frankness and child-like naiveness appealed to the wider range of TV viewers around the country during the live broadcasts of Myanmar Idol. His polite and respectful manners, his adoration of his mother and his strong religious beliefs and practices as a devote Buddhist won millions of hearts, young and old, male and female, around the Buddhist-majority country.

Just before the Grand final Week of the competition, his home-coming journey was overwhelmingly welcomed by millions of people from Ayeyarwady delta and was a record crowd for any kind of artists in the region. He subsequently won the competition. Again, his home-coming as the Winner of Myanmar Idol drew even larger crowds along the way to his home town. The journey of less than 200 km to his home took more than 14 hours as every village and town came out to congratulate him.

=== 2018–present: Rising popularity ===
Phyo Myat Aung rose to fame after winning the popular televised singing competition Myanmar Idol Season 3. He amassed a huge fanbase which is fierily protective and loyal to him. His journey to stardom was full of hardship and struggle. Since winning the competition, he engaged in shooting commercial advertisements, stage performances and preparing to record his first solo album. Within his first solo album promotion event, the album was sold over 1000 copies in just 30 minutes.

== Accolades ==
After his winning in Myanmar Idol season 3, Phyo Myat Aung was awarded in honor award from hometown for his breakthrough.

Award	Year (Note: Indicates the year of ceremony. Each year is linked to the article about the awards held that year, wherever possible.)	Recipient(s) and nominee(s)	Category	Result	Ref.
City FM awards	2021	Phyo Myat Aung	Most Popular Male Vocalist of the Year	Won	
Shwe FM awards	2019	Phyo Myat Aung	Most Popular Singer (Male)	Won	
Shwe FM awards	2020	Phyo Myat Aung	Most Popular Singer (Male)	Won	
Padamyar FM awards	2019	Tint A Twat Ma Nat Phyan (Tomorrow For You)	Song of the Year	Won	
Joox Half Year Music Awards	2020	Second God (Money)	Popular Song award	Won	
