= Phyu Phyu Kyaw Thein =

Burmese pop singer (born 1981)

Phyu Phyu Kyaw Thein ဖြူဖြူကျော်သိန်း
- Born: 22 April 1981 (age 45); Rangoon, Burma
- Genre: Burmese pop
- Instrument: Voice
- Years active: 2003 – present
- Website: Official website

Phyu Phyu Kyaw Thein (Burmese: ဖြူဖြူကျော်သိန်း; born 22 April 1981) is a Burmese pop singer, known for her stage presence and costumes, which have drawn comparisons to Lady Gaga. She has been a UNICEF celebrity ambassador since 2008.

== Early life and education ==
Phyu Phyu Kyaw Thein was born in Rangoon, Burma (now Yangon, Myanmar), on 22 April 1981 to Kyaw Thein, a ranking civil servant at the Ministry of Cooperatives, and his wife, Tin Tin Kyi, a lecturer at the Yangon University of Economics. She has an elder sister, Nyo Nyo Thein, who was born 7 years earlier.

She is a physician by training; she graduated from the University of Medicine 1, Yangon.

== Career ==
Phyu Phyu Kyaw Thein debuted in 2003 with the album Not Concerned Anymore (လုံးဝမသက်ဆိုင်တော့ပါ). She joined the 2019 season of Myanmar Idol as a judge. She serves as a secretary for the Myanmar Music Association.

== Philanthropy ==
Phyu Phyu Kyaw Thein has donated 100 million kyat donation for Arakanese Rakhine refugees in Rakhine state, with 82.234 million kyats specifically distributed to those in Kyaukphyu, Pauk Taw, Ann, and Ramree.

== Political activities ==
Following the 2021 Myanmar coup d'état, she participated in the anti-coup movement both in person at rallies and through social media. Denouncing the military coup, she took part in protests, starting in February. She joined the "We Want Justice" three-finger salute movement. The movement was launched on social media, and many celebrities have joined the movement.

On 13 April 2021, warrants for her arrest were issued under Section 505 (a) of the Myanmar Penal Code by the State Administration Council for speaking out against the military coup. Along with several other celebrities, she was charged with calling for participation in the Civil Disobedience Movement (CDM) and damaging the state's ability to govern, with supporting the Committee Representing Pyidaungsu Hluttaw, and with generally inciting the people to disturb the peace and stability of the nation.

== Discography ==
- Not Concerned Anymore (Burmese: လုံးဝမသက်ဆိုင်တော့ပါ) (2003)
- The Curse of Love (Burmese: ချစ်သူအမုန်း ကျိန်စာ) (2007)
- Memoir of a Diva (2011)
- Damsel in Distress (Burmese: မိန်းကလေးတစ်ယောက်အသည်းကွဲနေတယ်) (2013)
- Thou Shalt Be Remembered (Burmese: နာမည်ကျန်နေရစ်မယ်) (2015)
- April Fool (mini-album) (2016)
- Storm (mini-album) (2018)

== Accolades ==
Award	Year (Note: Indicates the year of ceremony. Each year is linked to the article about the awards held that year, wherever possible.)	Recipient(s) and nominee(s)	Category	Result	Ref.
City FM awards	2008	Phyu Phyu Kyaw Thein	Best Selling Studio Music Album Female Vocalist of the Year	Won	
Shwe FM awards	2011	Is it Love?(အချစ်တဲ့လား?)	Most Popular Song award	Won	
Shwe FM awards	2013	Damsel in Distress	Best album	Won	
Joox Half Year Music Awards	2020	Just Go Away(ထွက်သွားပါတော့)	Popular Song Award	Won	
