= ChanMyae MgCho =

Burmese singer (born 1999)

ChanMyae MgCho ချမ်းမြေ့မောင်ချို
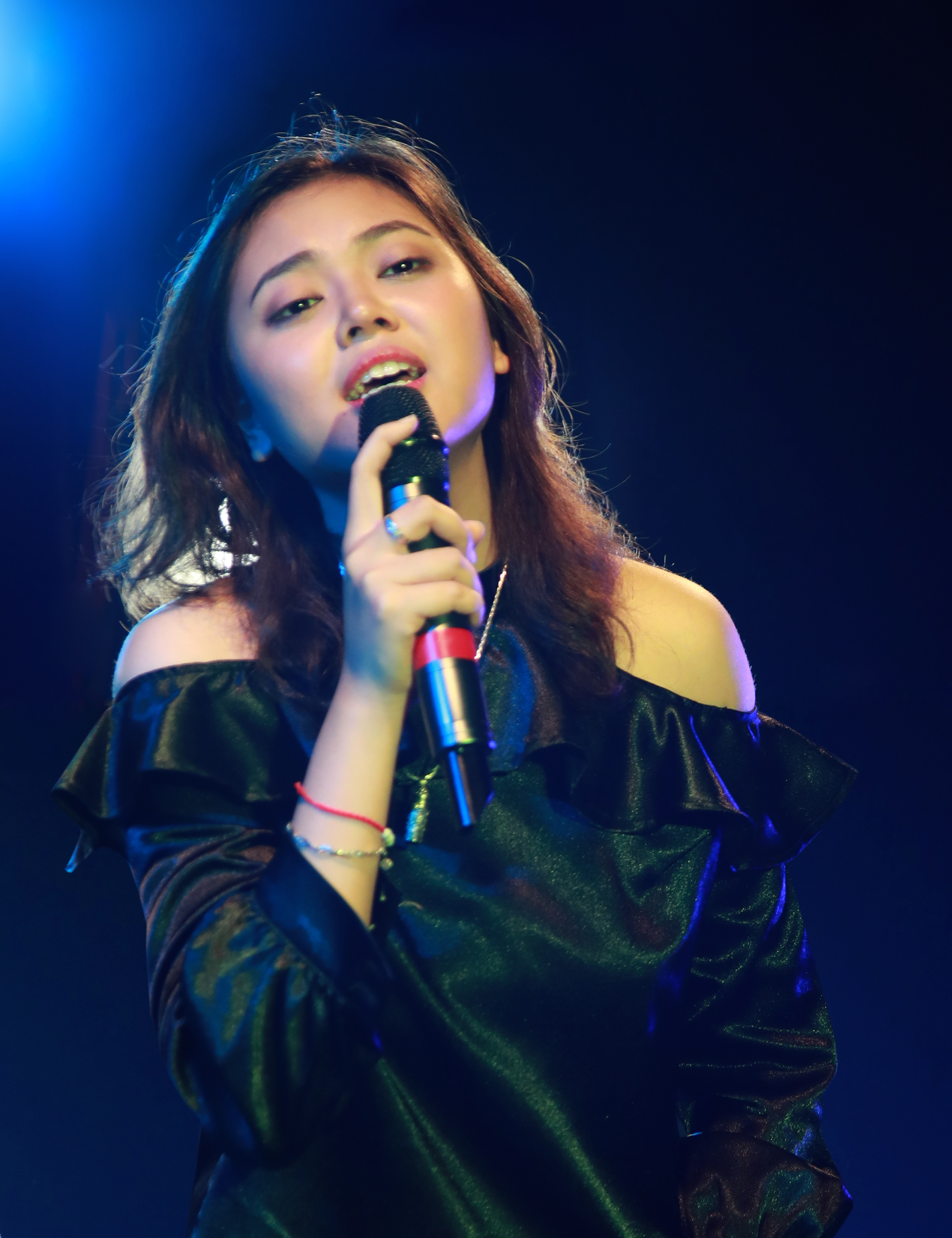
- Mg Cho performing during her music concert in March 2019

Background information
- Born: ChanMyae MgCho; 20 September 1999 (age 26); Yangon, Myanmar
- Genres: Pop, pop rock
- Occupation: Singer-songwriter
- Instruments: Vocals; guitar
- Years active: 2018–present

ChanMyae MgCho (Burmese: ချမ်းမြေ့မောင်ချို; born 20 September 1999) is a Burmese singer. She rose to prominence following her finish as the runner-up on the third season of Myanmar Idol.

== Early life and education ==
ChanMyae MgCho was born on 20 September 1999 in Yangon, Myanmar. She is the youngest daughter of Maung Maung Cho, a sailor and his wife Ei Ei, a singer who was famous around 1990s. She has an elder brother, Thura MgCho, is an actor. She graduated high school at Practising School Yangon Institute of Education. She was admitted to Dagon University, majoring in law.

== Career ==
=== Career beginning ===
MgCho began singing at her age ten. She sang covered songs inserting with her own lyrics. She created her own short video clips, sang covered songs on social media. She has street singing experience when she visited to Singapore, in 2015. She participated in school events and sang songs for her teachers and friends.

In 2017, she sang a song together with her mom as her very first duet song on stage at her age of 18. Then, she started her first step of challenging which is Myanmar Idol Season 3 competition.

=== 2018: Competing in Myanmar Idol and rising popularity ===
In May 2018, she competed in the third season of Myanmar Idol and finally, she was selected in Top 11 finalists. And also faced many pressures from that competition. She did her best and after progressing to the Grand Final, she was unable to participate due to illness. However, she couldn't participate in Grand Final, she came and sang the song "Tomorrow For You", for her fans and that song became hit one. End of the event, she was awarded first runner up of the Myanmar Idol Season 3.

In December 2018, she received Celebrity Fashion Award at the Shwe FM 9th Anniversary.

=== 2019–present: Solo activities ===
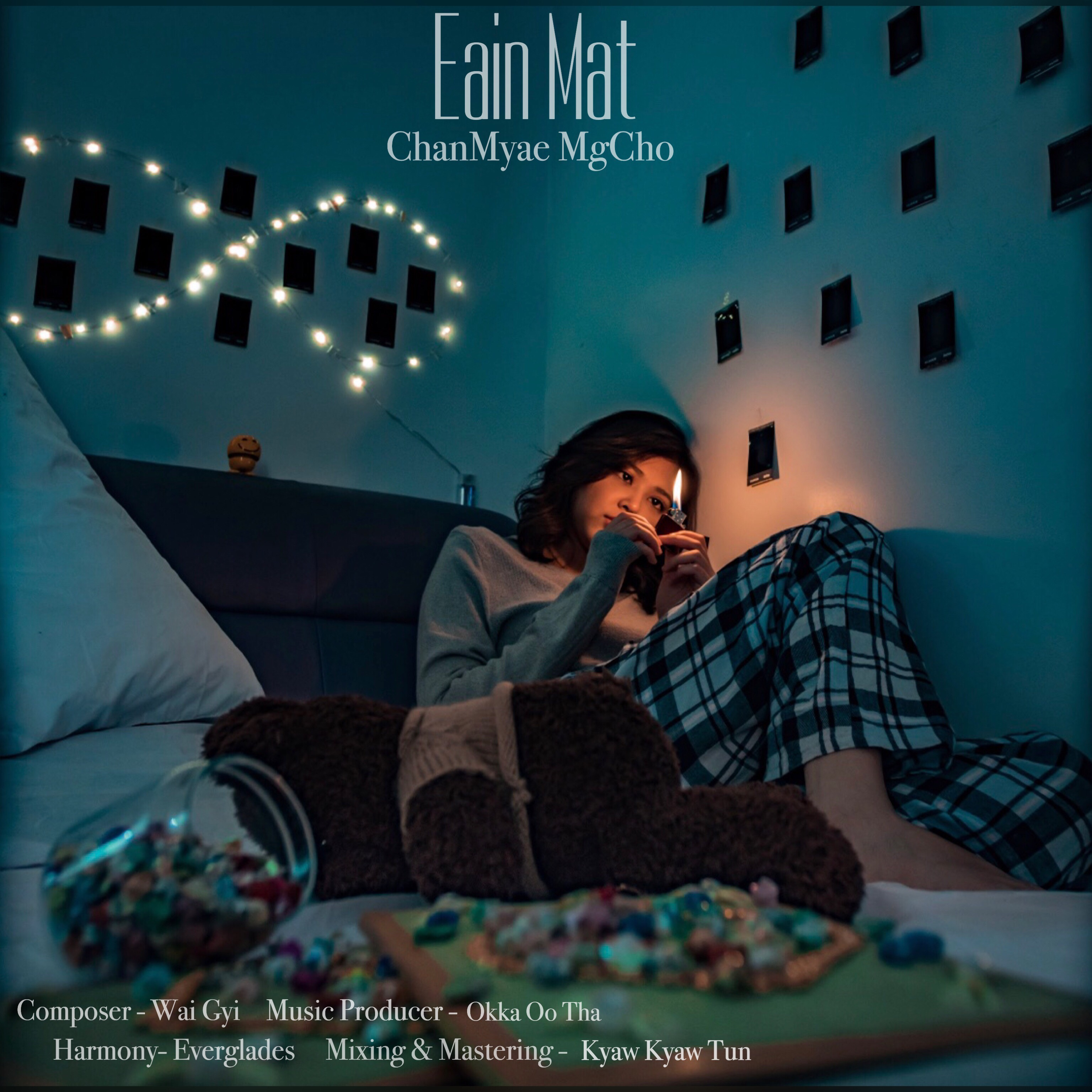
Eaint Mat single cover

In 2019, she released her first single "Eaint Mat" (Dream) on 1 March 2019 that became most popular among the JOOX listeners finally hit the record of first position and maintain the 1-100 position till noand started endeavoring to be able to produce and distribute her first solo album.

She launched her debut solo album "Eleven" on 22 December 2019.

In 2020, she released her first MTV for 2020," သင့်အတွက်မနက်ဖြန် " (Tomorrow for you) on 20 May 2020

== Political activities ==
Following the 2021 Myanmar coup d'état, ChanMyae MgCho was active in the anti-coup movement both in person at rallies and through social media. Denouncing the military coup, she has taken part in protests since February. She joined the "We Want Justice" three-finger salute movement. The movement was launched on social media, and many celebrities have joined the movement.

On 2 April 2021, warrants for her arrest were issued under section 505 (a) of the penal code by the State Administration Council for speaking out against the military coup. Along with several other celebrities, she was charged with calling for participation in the Civil Disobedience Movement (CDM) and damaging the state's ability to govern, with supporting the Committee Representing Pyidaungsu Hluttaw, and with generally inciting the people to disturb the peace and stability of the nation.

== Discography ==
=== Solo albums ===
- Eleven (2019)

=== Singles ===
- Eaint Mat (2019)
- Falling (2020)

=== Duet songs ===
- We are one (2018 - New year Count Down song) with Y3IIO
- A Chit Shi Taw Nay Swal Myar (2019) with Myo Kyawt Myaing
- Eain Pyan Chain (2020) with PAST12 an Daniel Saw
- Ta Mee Chawt Tay (2020) with Ei Ei
- A Nghwe A Thet Myar (7/6/2020)with Ah Boy

== Award ==
- Joox Top 10 Popular Song Award for 2020
