= Pan Thakhin =

1996 Burmese Film

- poster
- Burmese: ပန်းသခင်
- Directed by: Kyee Myint
- Screenplay by: Shwe Thinzar
- Story by: Shwe Thinzar
- Starring: Lwin Moe; Htet Htet Moe Oo; Zaw Lin
- Music by: Khin Maung Gyi
- Production company: Yamona Film Production
- Release date: 1996
- Running time: 137 minutes
- Country: Myanmar
- Language: Burmese

Pan Thakhin (Burmese: ပန်းသခင်) is a 1996 Burmese drama film, directed by Kyee Myint starring Lwin Moe, Htet Htet Moe Oo and Zaw Lin. The film won the Best Picture Award, Kyee Myint won the Best Director Award, Htet Htet Moe Oo won the Best Actress Award and Zaw Lin won the Best Supporting Actor Award in 1996 Myanmar Motion Picture Academy Awards.

== Cast ==
- Lwin Moe as Kaung Kyaw
- Htet Htet Moe Oo as Pan Ei
- Zaw Lin as Pan Aung

== Awards ==
Year	Award	Category	Nominee	Result
1996	Myanmar Motion Picture Academy Awards	Best Picture	Yamona Film	Won
1996	Myanmar Motion Picture Academy Awards	Best Director	Kyee Myint	Won
1996	Myanmar Motion Picture Academy Awards	Best Actress	Htet Htet Moe Oo	Won
1996	Myanmar Motion Picture Academy Awards	Best Supporting Actor	Zaw Lin	Won
