= Ei Ei =

Burmese singer

Ei Ei အိအိ
- Born: 14 November 1965 (age 60); Mandalay, Myanmar
- Genre: Burmese pop
- Occupation: Singer-songwriter
- Instrument: Vocals
- Years active: 1990–1995; 2017–present (re-entered)

Ei Ei (Burmese: အိအိ; born 14 November 1965) is a Burmese singer. She is best known for her music around 1990s and was a popular singer in karaoke music. She sings and works together with singers Zarli Naing and Thiri Ko Ko. They released a solo album 3 Arrows.

She completely disappeared from a music career for 23 years from the time of her marriage and had a child. Her husband is Maung Maung Cho, a sailor, married on 24 November 1995. They have two children; one daughter and one son. In 2018, she returned to her music industry career and released new version of 3 Arrows album with Zarli Naing and Thiri Ko Ko on 31 May 2018. Her son Thura MgCho, is an actor and her daughter, ChanMyae MgCho, is a singer.

== Discography ==
=== Solo albums ===
- 3 Arrows (1993)
- 3 Arrows (New version album) (2018)
