= Billy La Min Aye =

Billy La Min Aye ဘီလီလမင်းအေး
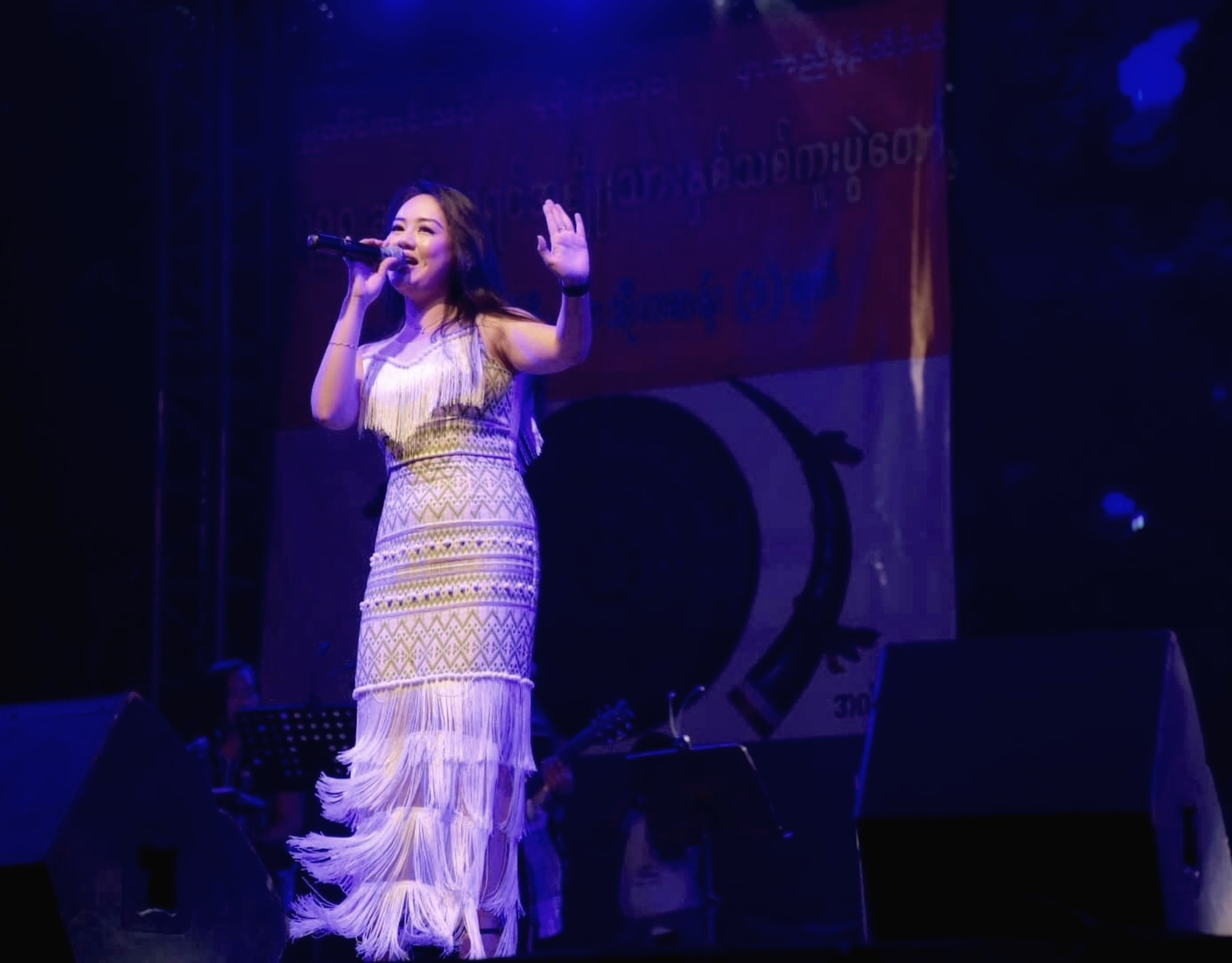
- Billy performs in a concert

Background information
- Born: Billy La Min Aye; 22 March 1995 (age 31); Taunggyi, Shan State, Myanmar
- Genres: Pop, R&B
- Occupation: Singer-songwriter
- Instruments: Vocals; Piano
- Years active: 2022–present

Billy La Min Aye (Burmese: ဘီလီလမင်းအေး, S'gaw Karen: ဘ့လံၤလၣ်မ့အ့; born 22 March 1995) is a Burmese singer-songwriter of ethnic Pa'O-Karen descent. She gained recognition from competing in the second season of Myanmar Idol and finishing as the runner-up. Billy released her debut album Perseverant Soul on 3 March 2018.

== Early life and education ==
Billy La Min Aye was born on 22 March 1995 in Taunggyi, Shan State, Myanmar to ethnic Pa'O-Karen father Khun Billy Shwe and his wife Thein Thein Aye. Her father is an ethnic Pa'O and her mother is an ethnic Karen. She is the eldest daughter of two siblings, with a younger sister. She attended high school at Basic Education High School No. 4 Taunggyi and graduated from Taunggyi University with a degree in English. She was interested in singing since childhood, the love of music was seeded in her when her father sent her to a Sunday school around the age of eight.

Billy worked as a former private school teacher and taught four skills in English to young children at a private education center in Taunggyi.

== Music career ==
=== 2017: Competing in Myanmar Idol and rising popularity ===
Billy started out on her music career as a contestant in Season 2 of Myanmar Idol, a televised singing competition. In the Myanmar Idol grand final, she competed with Thar Nge. With the voting results of the whole country, Thar Nge became the winner; she was placed in 1st runner-up. Since winning the 1st runner-up in Myanmar Idol, she engaged in shooting commercial advertisements, stage performances, and many concerts at various locations throughout Myanmar.

=== 2018–present: Solo debut and activities ===
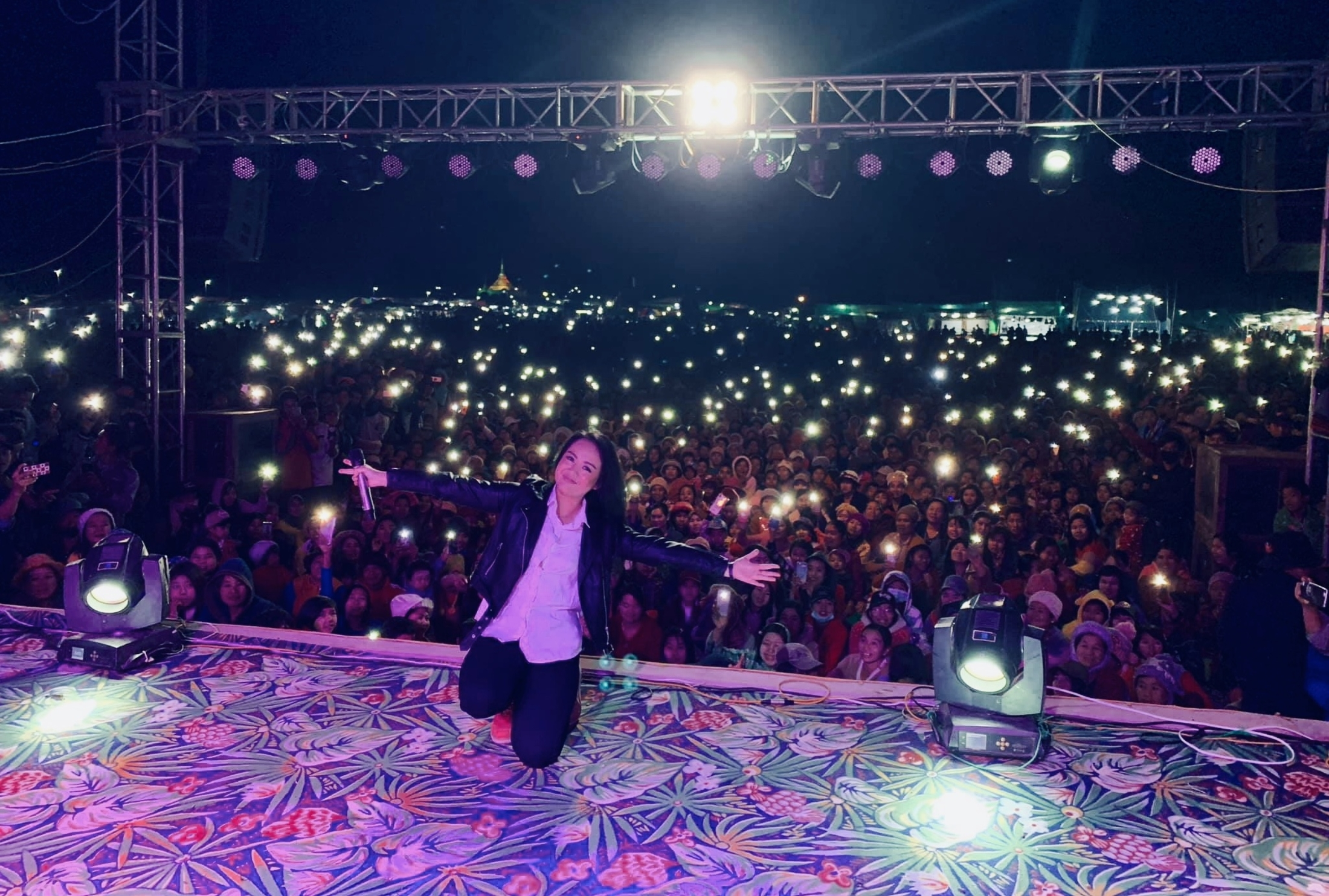
Billy performing at a concert

In 2018, Billy started endeavoring to be able to produce and distribute her first solo album. She launched her debut solo album "Perseverant Soul" on 3 March 2018.

Billy won the Shwe FM's 2018 "Most Requested Song Award" and Padamyar FM's 2018 "Most Requested Song Award" with "Tine Yin Thu Lay Kyun Ma", a song from her solo album.

On 1 February 2019, she released a single song called "February" MV on her Facebook page which earned 1 million views within 24 hours. Billy performed in the ceremony of the 2018 Myanmar Academy Award on 23 March 2019 in Yangon. Billy released her second solo album "Special One" on 19 May 2019.

=== 2020 activities ===
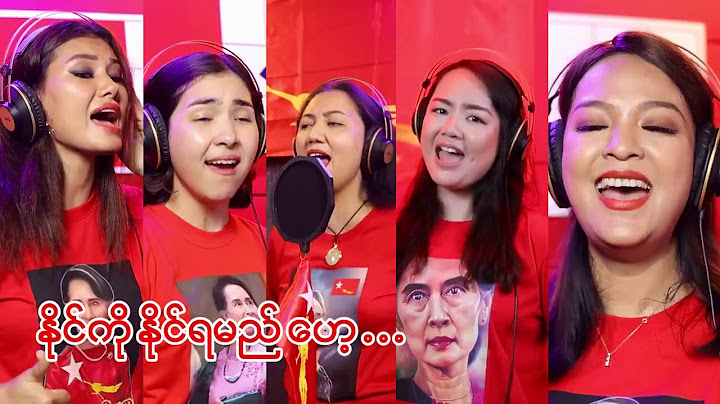
https://www.youtube.com/watch?v=6_WKqZSnXkw&si=21DawMwpTB-DK42y

On 10 September 2020, she sang a political campaign song named "Aung Hlan Hlwint Myi NLD" with several artists.

=== 2021 activities ===
In 2021, she did a protest with the artists against the military coup.

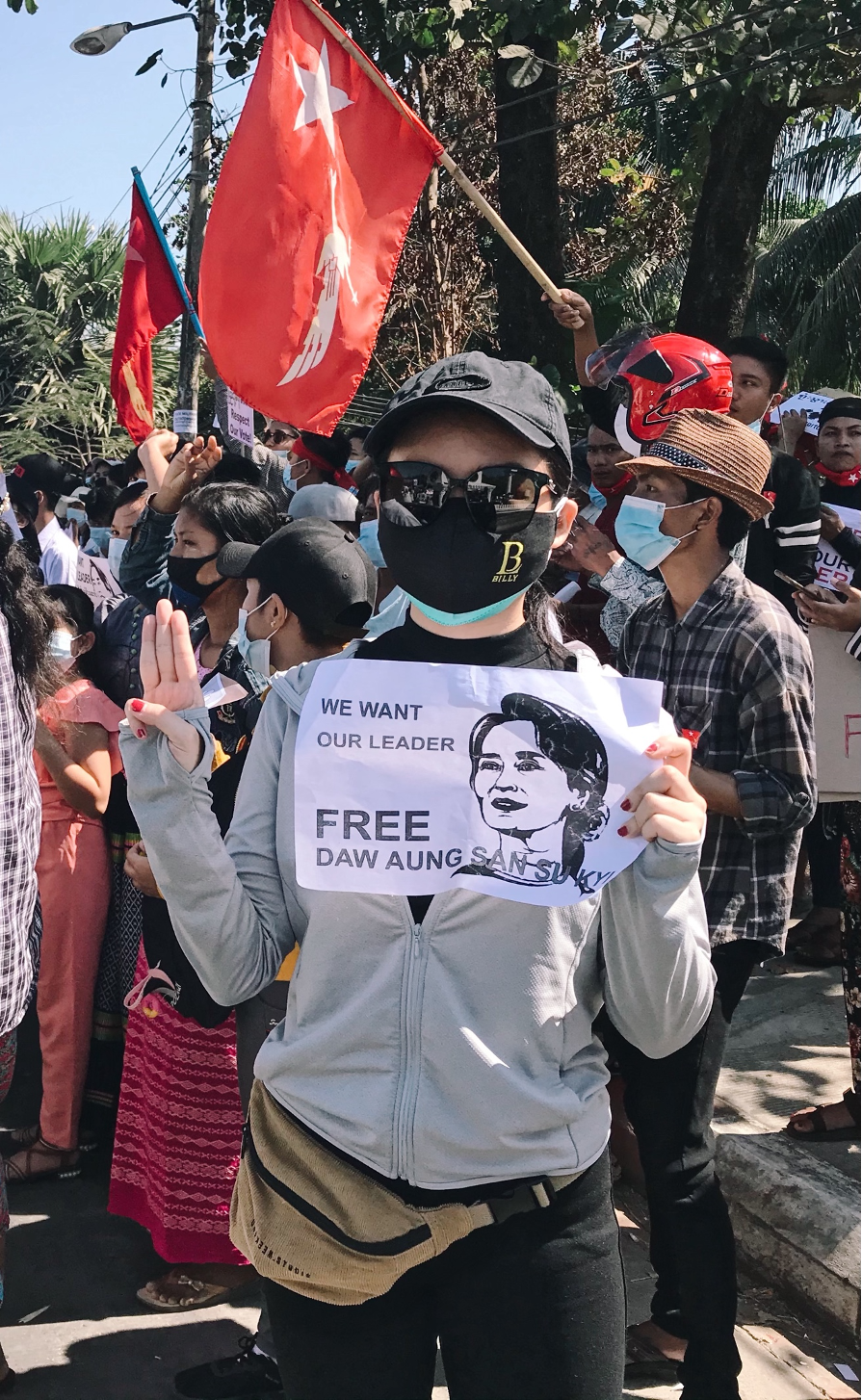
11 February 2021 at the North Dagon roundabout

== Ambassadorships ==
Billy was appointed as an ambassador of Japan Myanmar Culture in 2018.

== Discography ==
=== Solo albums ===
- Perseverant Soul (အရှုံးမပေးတဲ့ ဝိညာဉ်) (2018)
- Special One (2019)

=== Singles ===
- February (2019)
- Daddy (2019)
- The Joker (featuring Mee No) (2019)
- Nga Chit Thu Yae Mway Nay (2019)
- Yay San Lay San (2020)
- Wait (2020)
- Pyee Sone Mae Yat (2020)
