= Poe Mi =

Burmese singer-songwriter (born 1988)

Poe Mi ပိုးမီ
- Birth name: Poe Mi Mi Swe
- Born: 10 November 1988 (age 36); Padigon, Bago Region, Myanmar
- Genres: Pop, rock
- Occupation: Singer-songwriter
- Instruments: Vocals; Guitar
- Years active: 2017–present

Poe Mi (Burmese: ပိုးမီ; born Poe Mi Mi Swe on 10 November 1988) is a Burmese singer-songwriter who gained recognition from competing in the second season of Myanmar Idol and finishing as the 2nd runner-up. Poe released her debut album Nout Htet Tit Yourk Ma Shi (Only You) on 1 March 2018.

Poe Mi featured in the Idols Global's "Idol Winners of 2017". In fact, she is not actually a winner but simply featured as a winner.

== Early life and education ==
Poe Mi was born 10 November 1988 in Padigon, Bago Region, Myanmar to Soe Myint and his wife Khin Than Wai. She is the eldest daughter of four siblings, having three younger sisters. She graduated from Yangon University of Economics with a degree in Business administration (BBA) in 2008.

== Career ==
Poe started out on her music career as a contestant in Season 2 of Myanmar Idol, a televised singing competition. She finished as 2nd runner-up and in the top 3. Since winning the 2nd runner-up in Myanmar Idol, she has engaged in shooting commercial advertisements, stage performances, and many concerts at various locations throughout Myanmar.

Poe launched her debut solo album "Nout Htet Tit Yourk Ma Shi" (Only You) on 1 March 2018.

== Changing appearance ==
In 2019, Poe Mi underwent plastic surgery in Korea, to reduce fat from her cheeks.

== Discography ==
=== Solo albums ===
- Nout Htet Tit Yourk Ma Shi (နောက်ထပ်…တစ်ယောက်မရှိ) (2018)
