= Htet Htet Moe Oo =

Burmese actress

- ထက်ထက်မိုးဦး
- Born: Hmone Shwe Yi; 8 May 1971 (age 54); Mogok, Burma
- Occupation: Actress
- Children: Sis Loon Waddy Htet

Htet Htet Moe Oo (Burmese: ထက်ထက်မိုးဦး, Burmese pronunciation: [tʰɛʔ tʰɛʔ mó ʔú]; born Hmone Shwe Yi on 8 May 1971) is a two-time Myanmar Academy Award winning Burmese actress, most well known as the "queen of commercials" for her prolific TV commercial appearances during the 1990s to early 2000s.

== Early life and education ==
Htet Htet Moe Oo was born on 8 May 1971 in Mogok, Mandalay Division, Burma, to a painter, Khin Aung, also known by his artist name, Myat Aung, and his wife, Khin Myo Nyunt.

== Career ==
She entered the entertainment industry around 1991 to 1992, and eventually changed her name to Htet Htet Moe Oo, under the tutelage of director San Aung. Her first film, Real Person (တကယ့်လူ) also starred Soe Thu and Soe Myat Thuzar . She later starred in Tharaphu (သရဖူ), also starring Moh Moh Myint Aung and Ye Aung. She won the Myanmar Motion Picture Academy Awards for Best Actress in 1996 and 2001.

== Personal life ==
Htet Htet Moe Oo has been legally married three times; she was previously married to Burmese actor, Min Oo, and was married to Burmese rapper Anegga from 2004 to 2008. She married Zu Myat Htet, also known as Sai Lwan, an actor, on 10 August 2010. The two have a daughter, Sit Lun Wadi Htet (b. 2011). In 2012, she was fined Ks.1,000/- (US$1) by a Yangon court for slapping a 7Day News journalist who asked about her matrimonial affairs during a press event.

== Filmography (big screen movies) ==
Lists of Films
Year	Film	Director	Co-Stars	Notes
1996	Pan Thakhin (Guardian of Flowers)	Kyi Myint	Lwin Moe, Zaw Linn	Won-Best Actress Award
2001	Thamee Mite (Rebellious Daughter)	Khin Maung Oo+Soe Thein Htut	Lwin Moe, Ya Wai Aung, May Than Nu, Myint Myint Khaing	Won-Best Actress Award
2001	Pin Sa Let Yin Khun	Malekha Soe Htike Aung	Dwe, Min Oo, Eaindra Kyaw Zin, Hla Eain Za Li Tint	
2001	Kaung Kin Htet Ka Pann Ta Pwint(A Flower in the Sky)	Nyunt Myanmar Nyi Nyi Aung	Lu Min, Moe D	
2001	Pan Ta Pwint Phan Sin Chin	Kyi Phyu Shin	Lwin Moe, Lu Min	
2002	Nyar Thu Tapar Yauk Kyar Mein Ma(Me, Another, Man, Woman)	Pa Gyi Soe Moe	Yan Aung, Lwin Moe, May Than Nu, Khin Zar Chi Kyaw	
2002	Shwe Hmone Kyal De Moe Kaung Kin		Lu Min, Soe Myat Nandar, Kyi Hlae Hlae Oo	
2002	Hlo-Whayt-Yin-Khone-Than(Secret Heart Beat)		Dwe, Yar Zar Ne Win	
2004	Ta Khar Ta Yan Nite A Chit The Ei Tho Phit Tat The(Sometimes love can be like this)	Malekha Soe Htike Aung	Dwe, Ye Aung	
2005	Kyan Sit Min(The King Kyan Sitt)	Lu Min	Nyunt Win, Lu Min, Nanda, Thu Htoo San, May Than Nu, Pann Phyu, Soe Myat Nandar	

== Awards and nominations ==
Year	Award	Category	Nominated work	Result
1996	Myanmar Academy Award	Best Actress	Pan Thakhin (Guardian of Flowers)	Won
2001	Myanmar Academy Award	Best Actress	Thamee Mite (Rebellious Daughter)	Won
