= Si Thu Lwin =

Burmese pop singer and actor (born 1973)

Si Thu Lwin စည်သူလွင်
- Born: Si Thu Lwin; 25 March 1973 (age 53)
- Origin: Yangon, Myanmar
- Genres: Pop
- Occupations: Singer, Actor
- Years active: 1995–present

Si Thu Lwin (Burmese: စည်သူလွင်, also spelt Sithu Lwin; born 25 March 1973) is a Burmese pop singer and actor. He is considered one of the most successful Burmese singers and rose to fame with his debut album Chit Thu Myat Yet Nayt.

== Early life and education ==
Si Thu Lwin was born on 25 March 1973 in Yangon, Myanmar. He is the only son of Ngwe Kyi, a cartoonist and his wife Daw Kywe. He graduated from Rangoon University with a degree in Math.

== Career ==
Sithu entered the singing contest held by U Saw Nu in 1993 and won the contest together with Tin Zar Maw. After his win, he prepared for her debut album named "Chit Thu Myar Yet Nayt" (The Day of Lovers). The album was released in 1995. Sithu has starred the leading role in the film named Nhote Kham Htet Ka Dar Thwar.

Sithu performed his first one-man show concert in 2014. Si Thu and Tin Zar Maw performed together in a live duet concert called "Beyond the 21st Duet Live" on 27 August 2016 at the Myanmar Convention Centre, where a huge crowd of thousands fans were celebrated.

On 10 November 2018, he embarked on his one-man solo concert called "A Part Of Me" at the Hexagon Complex, Shwe Htut Tin, Yangon.

== Discography ==
=== Solo albums ===
- Chit Thu Myar Yet Nayt
- A Linn Let Sone
- Ah Kaung Sone Tay Myar
- Lu Hnint Diary
- Nway Oo Kabyar
- Nya A Pyin Sar

== Personal life ==
Si Thu Lwin is married to Nwe Mar Kyaw in December 2010. They have one son.
