= Ngwe Kyi =

Burmese cartoonist and painter

- ငွေကြည်
- Born: 26 March 1948 (age 77); Yangon
- Education: studied at the painting and sculpture school and Cartoon Aung Shein
- Known for: Cartoonist; Painter

Ngwe Kyi (ငွေကြည်; born 26 March 1948) is a cartoonist and painter from Myanmar.

His Lawka Hma Bya (လောကကြီးမှာဗျာ) and Myanma Yoya Hatha (မြန်မာ့ရိုးရာဟာသ, lit. 'Traditional Burmese Humor') comics are particularly successful.

== Biography and career ==
He was born on 26 May 1948 in Yangon. He graduated from the Royal Government of the Arts (SSFH) in 1969.

He studied cartoon and painting art at the painting and sculpture school, Yangon and Cartoonist Aung Shein. Since 1969, he has been drawing cartoons under the penname Ngwe Kyi and is a well-known cartoonist in Myanmar.

=== Painting career ===
During the year 1969 to 2007, he was involved in a series of local group exhibitions. In August 2007, his first solo exhibition was exhibited at the New Treasure Art Gallery.
