= Myanmar International Fashion Week =

Myanmar fashion industry event

Myanmar Int'l Fashion Week
- Genre: Clothing and fashion exhibitions
- Frequency: Semi-annually
- Locations: (Juncity Square, Hexagon Complex, Dagon City 1, Central Boulevard), Yangon
- Country: Myanmar
- Inaugurated: 2012
- Founder: John Lwin

Myanmar International Fashion Week is an annual fashion week held in Yangon, Myanmar. It is the country's largest fashion display event and organized by John Lwin. The Fashion Week is intended for national fashion models and designers to display their talents. The first event was held in 2012.

== Celebrated dates and location ==
- Myanmar International Fashion Week 2012, run from November 16 to 18, at Junction Square, Yangon.
- Not celebrated in 2013.
- Myanmar International Fashion Week 2014, run from February 7 to 9, at Junction Square, Yangon.
- Myanmar International Fashion Week 2015, run from February 6 to 8, at Dagon City 1, Yangon.

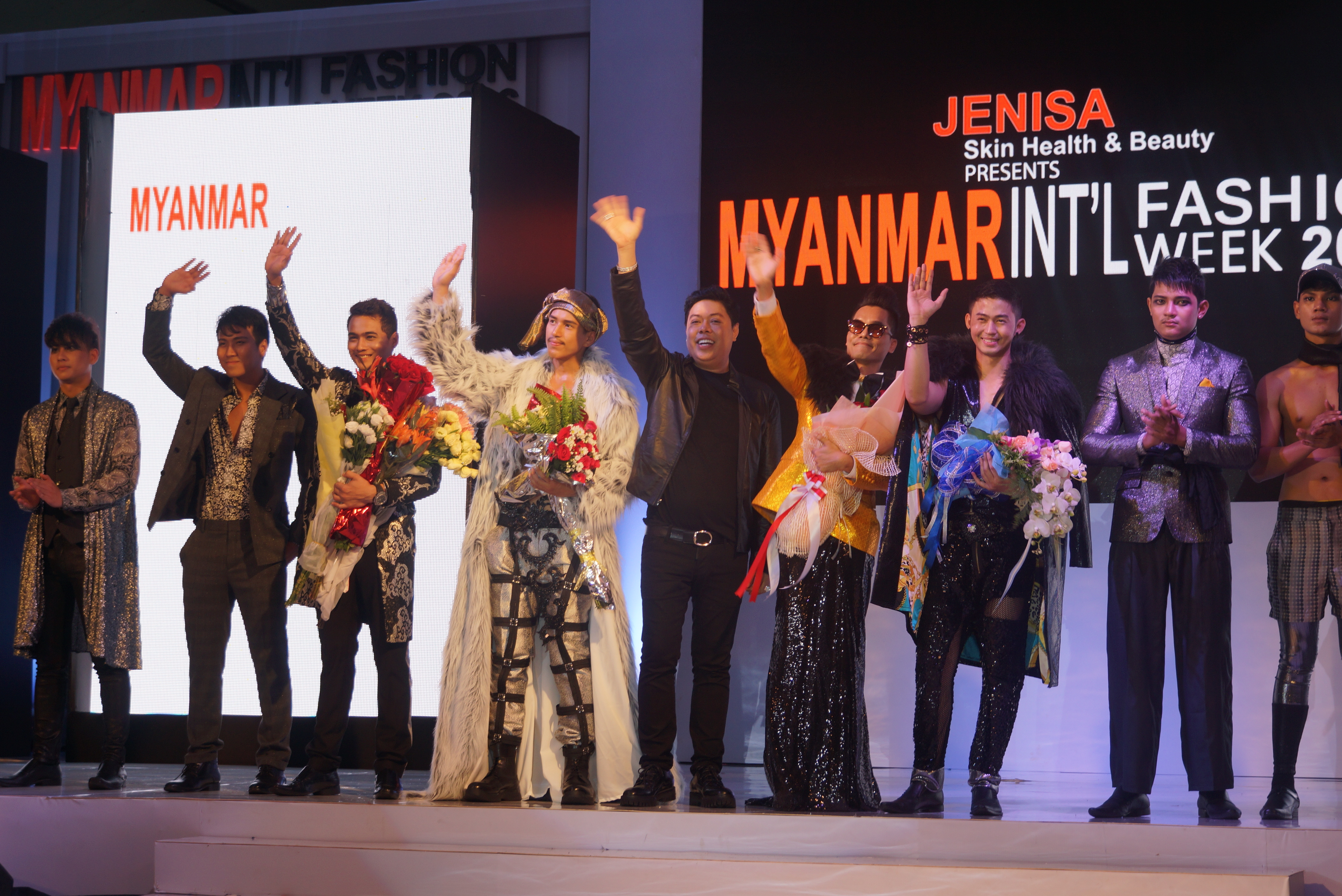
John Lwin successfully ending off Myanmar International Fashion Week 2016 with designers and actors

- Myanmar International Fashion Week 2016, run from October 7 to 9, at Hexagon Complex, Shwe Htut Tin Compound in Yangon.
- Myanmar International Fashion Week 2017, run from December 8 to 10, at the Hexagon Complex, Shwe Htut Tin Compound in Yangon.
- Myanmar International Fashion Week 2018, run from December 7 to 9, at the Hexagon Complex, Shwe Htut Tin Compound in Yangon.
- Myanmar International Fashion Week 2019 took place at the Central Boulevard, Yangon from 20 to 22 December.
