= San Yati Moe Myint =

- စံရတီမိုးမြင့်
- Born: Thal Thal Aung Myint; 3 June 1994 (age 32); Yangon, Myanmar
- Other name: Thal Thal
- Education: Dagon University
- Occupations: Actress; model
- Years active: 2010–present
- Height: 5 ft 5 in (1.65 m)
- Parent(s): Aung Myint; Khin Moe Thu

San Yati Moe Myint (Burmese: စံရတီမိုးမြင့်; born Thal Thal Aung Myint on 3 June 1994 in Yangon, Myanmar) is a Burmese actress and model. She is considered one of the most successful actresses in Burmese cinema and one of the highest-paid actresses. Throughout her career, she has acted in over 200 films.

== Early life and education ==
San Yati Moe Myint was born on 3 June 1994 in Yangon, Myanmar, to parents Aung Myint, aka Mazda Aung Myint, a photographer and his wife Khin Moe Thu. She is the second child among four siblings. From 1st to 8th grade, she attended Basic Education Middle School No. 1 Dagon, moving to Basic Education High School No. 2 Dagon for her 9th and 10th. She studied in the English majoring at the Dagon University for 2nd years.

== Career ==
She often got familiar with and adored all of the actors, actresses, models and all that came to her father's photo studio. She claimed that it was then that her passion for acting began, dancing and singing along to numerous TV advertisements that were common during her childhood years. Because of the passion, she joined John Lwin's model training tangency Stars & Models International in 2010. Since then, she took professional training in modelling and catwalk. She began her entertainment career as a photo model. She first appeared on the cover of the Idea Magazine. Then, she appeared on many local magazine cover photos. Then came the offers for TV commercials. She has appeared in countless more commercial advertisements. Her hardwork as a model and acting in commercials was noticed by the film industry and soon, movie casting offers came rolling in.

She made her acting debut in 2012 with a leading role in the Myanmar film Thain Mwe Thaw Lamin Nat Shine Thaw Pinle (The Gentle Moon, The Deep Sea) alongside Aung Ye Lin. In 2014, she made her big screen debut in the film Professor Dr. Sate Phwar, where she played the main role with Kyaw Thu, Yan Aung, Ye Aung and May Myat Noe, which screened in Myanmar cinemas on 24 June 2016. Ever since then, she has starred in over 200 films and countless more advertisements, music videos etc.

== Filmography ==
=== Film (Cinema) ===
- Professor Dr. Sate Phwar (2016)
- Thone Yout Paung Laung Kyaw (2019)
- Ko Paw (2020)

=== Film ===
| Year | Film | Burmese tile | Co-Stars | Note |
|---|---|---|---|---|
| 2012 | Thain Mwe Thaw Lamin Nat Shine Thaw Pinle | သိမ်မွေ့သောလမင်း နက်ရှိုင်းသောပင်လယ် | Aung Ye Lin | |
| 2013 | Chit Chat Ka 9 Lout Shi Dal | ချစ်ချက်က9လောက်ရှိတယ် | Khant Sithu | |
| 2016 | Pwint Tar A Pyit Lar | ပွင့်တာအပြစ်လား | Myint Myat | |
| 2016 | War Tee Coat | ဝါးတီးကုတ် | Myint Myat | |
| 2017 | Tout Tout Kyaw | တောက်တောက်ကျော် | Zay Ye Htet | |
