= Thar Nge =

Burmese singer of ethnic Rakhine descent (born 1992)

Thar Nge သားငယ်
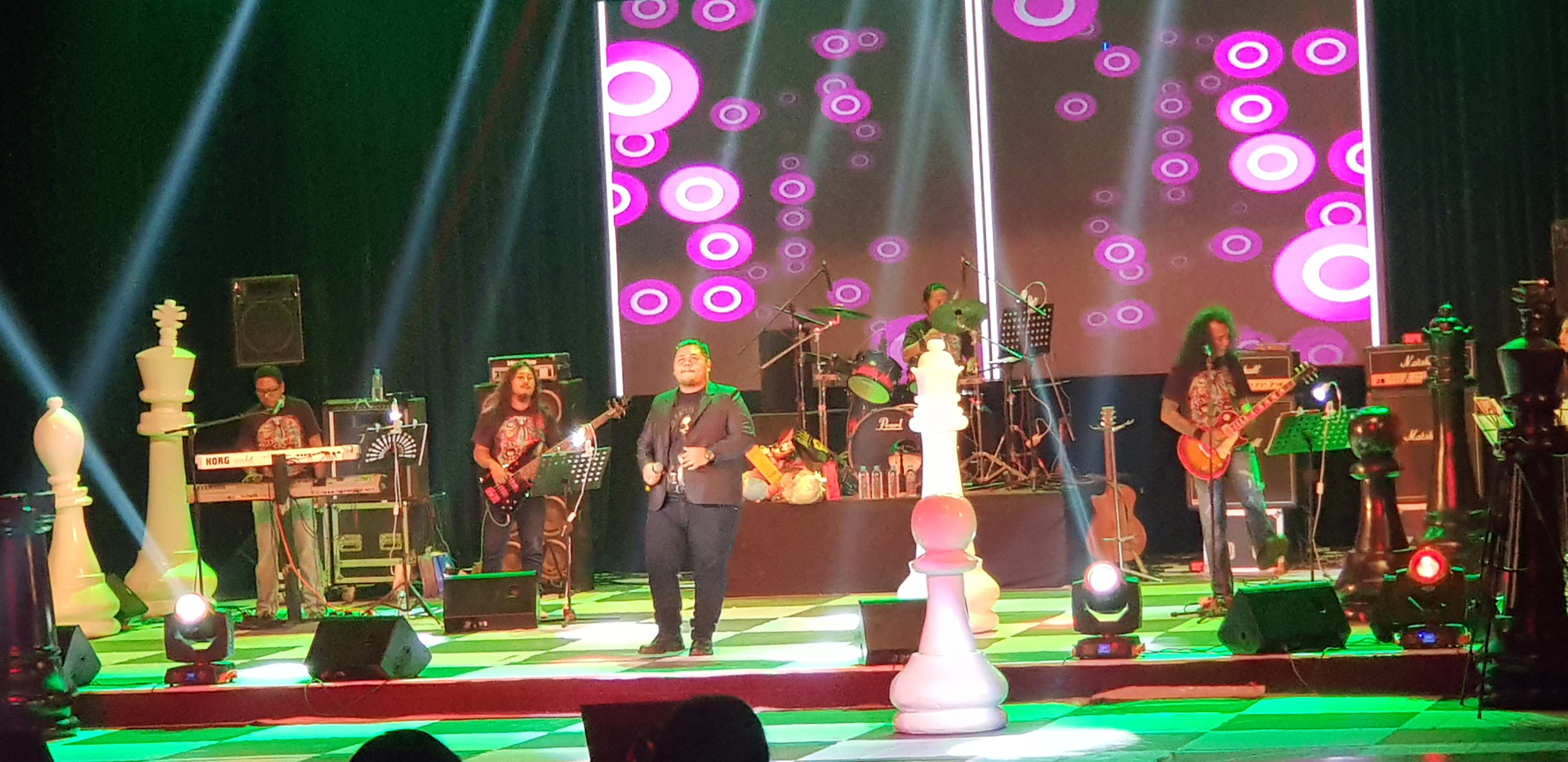

Background information
- Born: Zaw Win Htun; 23 March 1992 (age 33); Manaung, Rakhine State, Myanmar
- Genres: Rock, Pop, Pop rock
- Occupation: Singer-songwriter
- Instruments: Vocals; Guitar
- Years active: 2017–present

Thar Nge (Burmese: သားငယ်; born Zaw Win Htun on 23 March 1992) is a Burmese singer of ethnic Rakhine descent. He gained national attention for winning the second season of Myanmar Idol. Thar Nge released his debut album Lan Ka Lay on 2 February 2018.

== Early life ==
Thar Nge was born on 23 March 1992 in Manaung, Rakhine State, and is an ethnic Rakhine from Rakhine State. Thar Nge and his wife live in Pyin Oo Lwin and worked as a fritter hawker for his living before he competed in Myanmar Idol.

== Career ==
=== 2017: Competing in Myanmar Idol and rising popularity ===
Thar Nge started out on his music career in participated as a contestant in Myanmar Idol, a televised singing competition. In the Myanmar Idol final, he competed with Billy La Min Aye with three songs. With the voting results of the whole country, he became the winner of the Season 2 of Myanmar Idol. Since winning in Myanmar Idol, he engaged in shooting commercial advertisements, stage performances, and many concerts at various locations throughout Myanmar.

=== 2018–present: Solo debut and activities ===
Thar Nge started endeavoring to be able to produce and distribute a solo album. He launched his debut solo album Lan Galay (လမ်းကလေး) on 2 February 2018.

== Political activities ==
Following the 2021 Myanmar coup d'état, Thar Nge was active in the anti-coup movement both in person at rallies and through social media. On 5 April 2021, warrants for his arrest were issued under section 505 (a) of the penal code by the State Administration Council for speaking out against the military coup. Along with several other celebrities, he was charged with calling for participation in the Civil Disobedience Movement (CDM) and damaging the state's ability to govern, with supporting the Committee Representing Pyidaungsu Hluttaw, and with generally inciting the people to disturb the peace and stability of the nation.

== Discography ==
=== Solo albums ===
- Lan Ka Lay (လမ်းကလေး) (2018)
