= Tin Zar Maw =

Burmese singer (born 1976)

Tin Zar Maw တင်ဇာမော်
- Born: Tin Zar Maw; 7 February 1976 (age 50); Rangoon, Burma
- Genres: Pop, Pop rock, Rock
- Occupation: Singer-songwriter
- Instruments: Vocals, guitar
- Years active: 1995–2005; 2013–present
- Label: TZM Records

Tin Zar Maw (Burmese: တင်ဇာမော်; born 7 February 1976) is a Burmese singer who debuted in the late 1990s. She is considered one of the most commercially successful Burmese female singers. Tin Zar Maw is currently one of the judges in Myanmar Idol.

== Career ==
=== Debut era ===
Tin Zar Maw entered the singing contest held by U Saw Nu in 1993 and won the contest together with Sithu Lwin. After her win, she prepared for her debut album named Swe Lan Hmu Pyat Tha Na. The album was released in 1995, and two years later, she released her second album "Kyin Nar Thu Hna Oo Sone Naing Yin". Since then, she gained the first recognition from her fans.

=== Breakthrough ===
In 1999, she released her third album A Chit Kyaung Thu. She also released trio album named Thone Yauk Zaga with Htun Eaindra Bo and Madi. The album was a commercial success reaching the top of the album charts. A few years later, she released a duo album named Myetsi Hmeit-pi Chit Laik Pa with Htun Eaindra Bo again.

On 6 February 2016, Tin Zar embarked on her first one-lady solo concert "My Birthday" (Kou Mway Nei) at the Myanmar Convention Centre's (MCC) outdoor area in Yangon. Tin Zar and Sithu Lwin performed together in a live duet concert on 27 August called "Beyond the 21st Duet Live" at the Myanmar Convention Centre. She released her seventh studio album "Seven" on 7 February 2017 after a long hiatus.

=== Myanmar Idol ===
Tin Zar joined Myanmar Idol which is the Myanmar version of American Idol as one of the judges since its Season 2.

== Discography ==
=== Solo albums ===
Tin Zar Maw has released seven solo albums to date

- Swal Lann Mhu Pyat Tha Nar (1995)
- Kyin Nar Thu Nha Oo Sone Naing Yin (1997)
- A Chit Kyaung Thu (2000)
- Tin Zar Maw's Tin Zar Maw (2002)
- Kyal Sin Lo A Chit Myar (2003)
- Tin Zar Maw's Tin Zar Maw Volume II (2005)
- Seven (2017)

== Personal life ==
Tin Zar is married and has a son and a daughter.

== Awards and nominations ==
=== 16th City FM Awards ===
She has won 2 City FM Awards to date.

Year	Recipient	Award	Result
2018	Seven	Best Selling Female Stereo Album	Won
2018	Seven	Best Selling Album of the Year	Won
