= Lwin Moe =

Burmese actor

- လွင်မိုး
- Born: 1970 (age 55–56); Myeik Township, Burma
- Other name: Maung Moe
- Occupations: Actor, Photographer
- Height: 177 cm (70 in)
- Spouse: May Thu
- Children: Yun Waddy Lwin Moe; Yun Nandy Lwin Moe
- Parent(s): U Myint Lwin; Daw Lay Shin
- Awards: Best Actor, Yin Tae Ka Saung Yar Thi (1999); Best Actor, Pan Ta Pwint Phan Sin Chinn (2001); Best Actor, Ta-Kha-Ga Ayeyarwady-Nya-Mya (2004)

Lwin Moe (Burmese: လွင်မိုး, pronounced [lwɪ̀ɰ̃ mó]; born 1970) is a three-time Myanmar Academy Award winning Burmese film actor.

He was born on an island in the Mergui Archipelago at the southern end of Myanmar. Father of two girls, Lwin Moe was a UNICEF "partner" for Myanmar in 2005. His grandfather is of Indian Punjabi origin.

Lwin Moe has different talents including acting, singing, and photography. He is famous for his acting roles in comedy movies, and also used to sing several songs. He took a break from the movie business beginning around 2005.

Lwin Moe's brother Maung Thi is a famous director in Myanmar. Lwin Moe's wife was a prominent TV representative in Myanmar. His daughter Yun Waddy Lwin Moe herself, is also a model and an actress.

Lwin Moe is also an aspiring photographer.

== Filmography ==
Films

- Daughter And Mothers (1991)
- Sein Khaw Nay Tae A Chit (1994)
- Pann Thakhin (1996)
- Never Shall We Be Enslaved (1997)
- Yin Tae Ka Saung Yar Thi (1999)
- Maung Mu Paing Shin (2000)
- Pan Ta Pwint Phan Sin Chinn (2001)
- Thamee Mite (2001)
- Ta Khar Ka Ayeyarwady Nya Myar (2004)
- Myet Nhar Myar Tae Kaung Kin (2004)
- Stranger's House (2019)
- What Happened to the Wolf? (2021)

Documentaries

- Lwin Moe is Traveling (လွင်မိုးခရီးသွားနေသည်)
