= Diramore =

Myanmar musician (born 1974)

Dira More
- ဓီရာမိုရ်
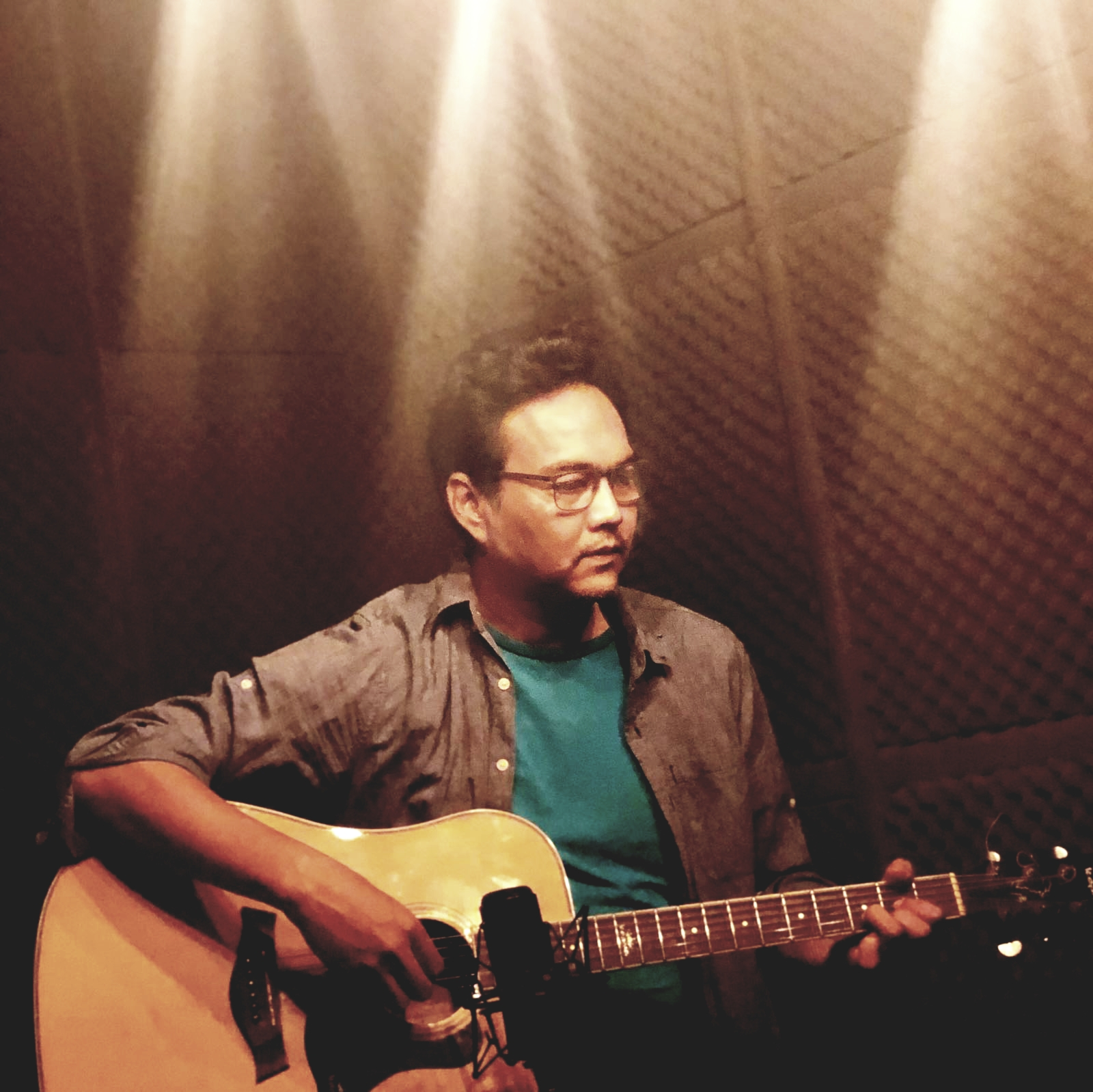
- Diramore in Gita Kabyar studio (2020)
- Born: Maung Maung Zaw Htet; 4 June 1974 (age 52); Kawkareik, Karen State, Myanmar
- Education: National University of Arts and Culture, Yangon (B.A.); Tokyo University of the Arts (M.A.)
- Occupations: Conductor, composer, singer, music director, music producer
- Years active: 2000–present
- Spouse: May Htoo Cho (m. 2008)
- Children: 3
- Parent(s): U Htun Naing (father); Daw Nyunt Nwe (mother)
- Awards: Myanmar Academy Awards
- Musical career
- Instruments: Guitar; piano; keyboard; violin; saung; vocals
- Labels: Third Eye; Excellent Creation; Gita Kabyar Production
- Website: diramore.com/en

Signature
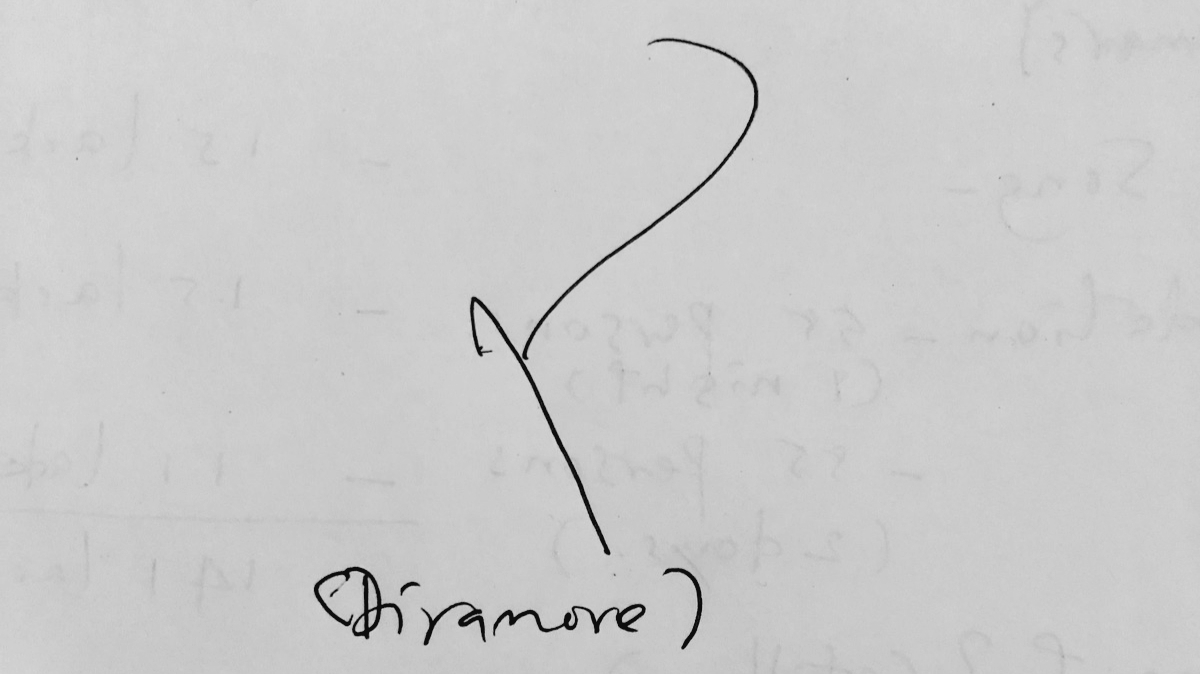

Diramore (Burmese: ဓီရာမိုရ်; born Maung Maung Zaw Htet; born 4 June 1974) is a Myanmar musician and pro-rector (retired) at the National University of Arts and Culture, Mandalay.

His stage name "Diramore" was given by his father and eldest brother before his debut. The name, meaning "The Wiser One," is a portmanteau of the Pali term for "wise" (dhīra) and the Burmese term for Mount Meru (Mount Myintmo).

== Early life and education ==
Diramore was born in Kawkareik, Kayin State, Myanmar, on 4 June 1974, from U Htun Naing and Daw Nyunt Nwe. He is the youngest among his siblings: five brothers and a sister. The eldest brother inspired him to be interested in music since he was young. At the age of twelve, he became part of his brothers’ band and performed at the parties, events and seasonal festivals in Mawlamyine. In 1992, he passed the matriculation exam with Physics distinction, from BEHS (4), Mawlamyine.

When the National University of Arts and Culture, Yangon (NUAC) officially opened in 1993, Diramore enrolled in there and became one of the first batch students majoring in music. During his years as a student at NUAC, Diramore determined to choose music as his career.

Initially, Diramore was not very interested in the traditional music of Myanmar. After learning more and more about Myanmar traditional music at the university, he began to recognize and appreciate its core value and the beauty. Later, he entered the National Performing Arts Competition, specializing in such Myanmar traditional instruments as Hne, Oozi, Doe Pat, and achieved gold, silver and bronze medals. Moreover, he gained knowledge of recording, dubbing, and film music production from some great intellects like U Ko Ko, U Hla Htut, U Tin Yee, Trumpet Win Oo, and so on. In 1997, he graduated with a bachelor's degree in Music.

Then, in 2003, Diramore won a full scholarship from Monbukagakusho Scholarship Program of Japan. Thus, in Japan, he continued to study as a research student until 2004, and completed his master's degree in Composition from Tokyo University of the Arts (Geidai), in 2006. The name of contemporary composition Diramore submitted for his master's degree was "End of This Life." The piece was originally inspired by a Myanmar traditional tune called "Byaing Taung (a melody usually played at the funerals). It described a human's feelings before death and involved five different sections: regaining consciousness, memories, pain, the door of death, and the end. It took a year for him to complete this piece. Besides, during his years in Japan, Diramore played as a member of Bunkyo Amateur Orchestra.

== Career ==
=== Government official ===
In 1997, Diramore graduated his first degree, and was appointed as a tutor at the Department of Music, National University of Arts and Culture, Yangon. Afterwards, Diramore won a scholarship and continued his study for the second degree, in Tokyo University of the Arts, from 2003 to 2006. In 2007, he became an assistant lecturer at the Department of Music, National University of Arts and Culture, Yangon. From 2010 to 2011, Diramore worked as an assistant director at the Department of Fine Arts, Ministry of Religious Affairs and Culture (Myanmar). In 2011, he was transferred to National University of Arts and Culture, Yangon as an associate professor of music. He became professor/ Head of Music Department, National University of Arts and Culture, Yangon in 2013 and got promoted as Prorector (training) of National University of Arts and Culture, Mandalay in 2019. After these years as government official, Diramore retired in 2021.

=== Musician ===
As a musician, Diramore is actively working as a composer, singer, music director, and music producer.

=== Composer, singer ===
When he was a university student, Diramore wanted to be a composer who is able to create not only Rock and Pop songs but also Classical pieces. Therefrom, he started composing songs and tried to persuade popular singers of that time to buy his songs. However, the songs were not accepted by those singers and he was not willing to create his songs for someone's preference. Thus, he stopped persuading others and made a decision to sing his own songs. In 2000, with his first solo album Guitar Shi Lar (Do You Have a Guitar?), Diramore debuted as a composer and singer. Chronologically, the second solo album Kyanaw Nae Gita (Music and I) was released in 2008; the third solo album Lamin Phan Pwel (Race of Catching the Moon) in 2012; and the fourth solo album Myit O Gyi (The Old River) in 2016. As a singer, he collaborated with some musicians from foreign countries. In 2016, Diramore and the Japanese singer Suwa Junko dropped a single named "Friends" for Kumamoto Earthquake relief fund. The next year, a single named "Phayar Pay Su (God's Reward)" was released as a result of the collaboration between Diramore and Joss Stone, during her Total World Tour. In 2020, he released his fifth solo album, the Circle and, in 2024, sixth solo album, Night respectively. His lifetime-inspired persons in music are Htoo Eain Thin, Khin Wann, Shwe Pyi Aye and Freddie Mercury (Queen).

=== Music director ===
The year when Diramore founded Gita Kabyar Orchestra (formerly Opera Orchestra) and began to work as a music director was in 2002. The earliest performance of Diramore and his orchestra was a live recorded album named Chitthu Doe Ye Mingalar Tay. Some of his achievements as a music director include: opening and closing ceremonies of 2013 SEA Games as well as 2014 ASEAN Para Games; Opening Ceremonies of Myanmar Motion Picture Academy Awards in 2017, 2018 and 2019; Japan-Myanmar Festivals; and collaborations with ASEAN-RUSSIA Symphony Orchestra, Orchestra for Myanmar, Taipei Civic Orchestra, and BBC Symphony Orchestra. In 2016, he was awarded by the Charles Wallace Burma Trust (UK-registered Charity), and went to University of Bristol, England, as a visiting fellow for three months. During the visit, he not only arranged orchestral version of Myanmar Classical song "Ywe Ta Nyar" for the BBC Symphony Orchestra, Orchestra for Myanmar and New Children's Choir; but also gave a presentation about Myanmar Classical Music at the Faculty of Arts, Bristol University. In addition, Diramore founded the NUAC Orchestra in 2016 with music students from National University of Arts and Culture, Yangon, and staged the NUAC Orchestra Concerts annually until 2018. Plus, he contributed as a music director in the concerts of some locally popular singers like Wai La, Lynn Lynn, Han Htoo Lwin, Sai Sai Kham Leng, Ni Ni Khin Zaw, and so on.

=== Music producer ===
Next, Diramore's career as a film score composer and music producer was activated in 2004, with the film Chit Thaw Arimadanapura Ii Mahar Aung Pwel directed by Kyi Phyu Shin. In fact, he is a two-time winner of Myanmar Motion Picture Academy Awards for Best Music. The first time was with the film Zawka Ka Nay The (Zawgyi is Dancing) in 2009, and the second time, with Luu Yadanar Thike (Luu Treasure Trove) in 2016. Additionally, Diramore won Best Music Score Award from Epic Animation, Comic and Game Festival 2016, US, with the animated short film My Life I Don't Want directed by Nyan Kyal Say. Thus far, he has composed and produced music for more than 50 films. In 2024, he won the best Music Academy Award for Myanmar's very first musical film, Eain Mat Kar Yan.

On top of his endeavors, Diramore attempted to preserve and promote Traditional Music of Myanmar. In 2013, he began a project named Beauty of Tradition in which a hundred of Myanmar Traditional songs were researched, organized and rerecorded. Then he cooperated with the Japanese Music Production Company, Airplane Label, and released three Myanmar traditional music albums in Japan during 2014 and 2015, under the name Beauty of Tradition. However, it was assumed that collecting only a hundred songs would not be enough in preserving Myanmar Traditional Music. Therefore, the project was broadened into a collection of 1,000 Myanmar Traditional songs and renamed as Gita Yadana. The aim of this project is to build a massive interactive archive where a thousand of old and rare Myanmar Traditional songs with high-resolution audio can be easily observed. Each song in the project was researched, organized, and rerecorded with the help of veteran traditional musicians around the country and of the Japanese audio engineer, Hiroshi Iguchi. The project was made up of seven categories, namely: Maha Gita (Classical Music), Kar La Paw (Traditional Contemporary Music), Thabin Gita (Dramatic Music), Myanmar Hsaing (Traditional Ensemble), Kyay Let Gita (Folk Music), Nat Chin (Spiritual Music), and Let Swam Pya (Instrumental Solos). The project was planned to release into nine volumes. In 2018, Gita Yadana was launched, and the very first volume of the project was released on both international and local streaming sites like Spotify, MMN and JOOX. By the end of 2020, Gita Yadana project has been completely released.

Being a teacher and a musician, Diramore never hesitates to share knowledge of music every chance he gets. He used to make contributions to numerous local workshops, seminars, and classes of government agencies as well as private schools like ILBC, Yangon Music School, MMDC, etc.

=== Founder ===
In 2022, he founded a music and art academy, Music City Myanmar, and the academy is being successful.

== Awards ==
Year	Award	Category	Nominated work	Result
2009	Myanmar Motion Picture Academy Awards	Best Music	Zawka Ka Nay The (Zawgyi is Dancing)	Won
2016	Myanmar Motion Picture Academy Awards	Best Music	Luu Yadanar Thike (Luu Treasure Trove)	Won
2016	Epic Animation, Comic and Game Festival, USA	Best Music Score	My Life I Don't Want	Won
2019	Myanmar Motion Picture Organization's Honorary Awards	Music	–	Won
2024	Myanmar Motion Picture Academy Awards	Best Music	Eain Mat Kar Yan	Won

== Discography ==
Diramore has released six solo albums.

Year	Album/ EP	Number of Songs	Label
2000	Guitar Shi Lar (Do You Have a Guitar?)	11	Third Eye
2008	Kyanaw Nae Gita (Music and I)	10	Gita Kabyar Production
2012	Lamin Phan Pwel (Race of Catching the Moon)	10	Gita Kabyar Production
2016	Myit O Gyi (The Old River)	10	Gita Kabyar Production
2020	The Circle (Sett Wyne) A+B	10	Gita Kabyar Production
2024	Night	10	Gita Kabyar Production

== Personal life ==
Diramore married to Ma May Htoo Cho in 2008. They are now parents of three children.
