= Aye Mya Phyu =

Burmese singer

Aye Mya Phyu အေးမြဖြူ
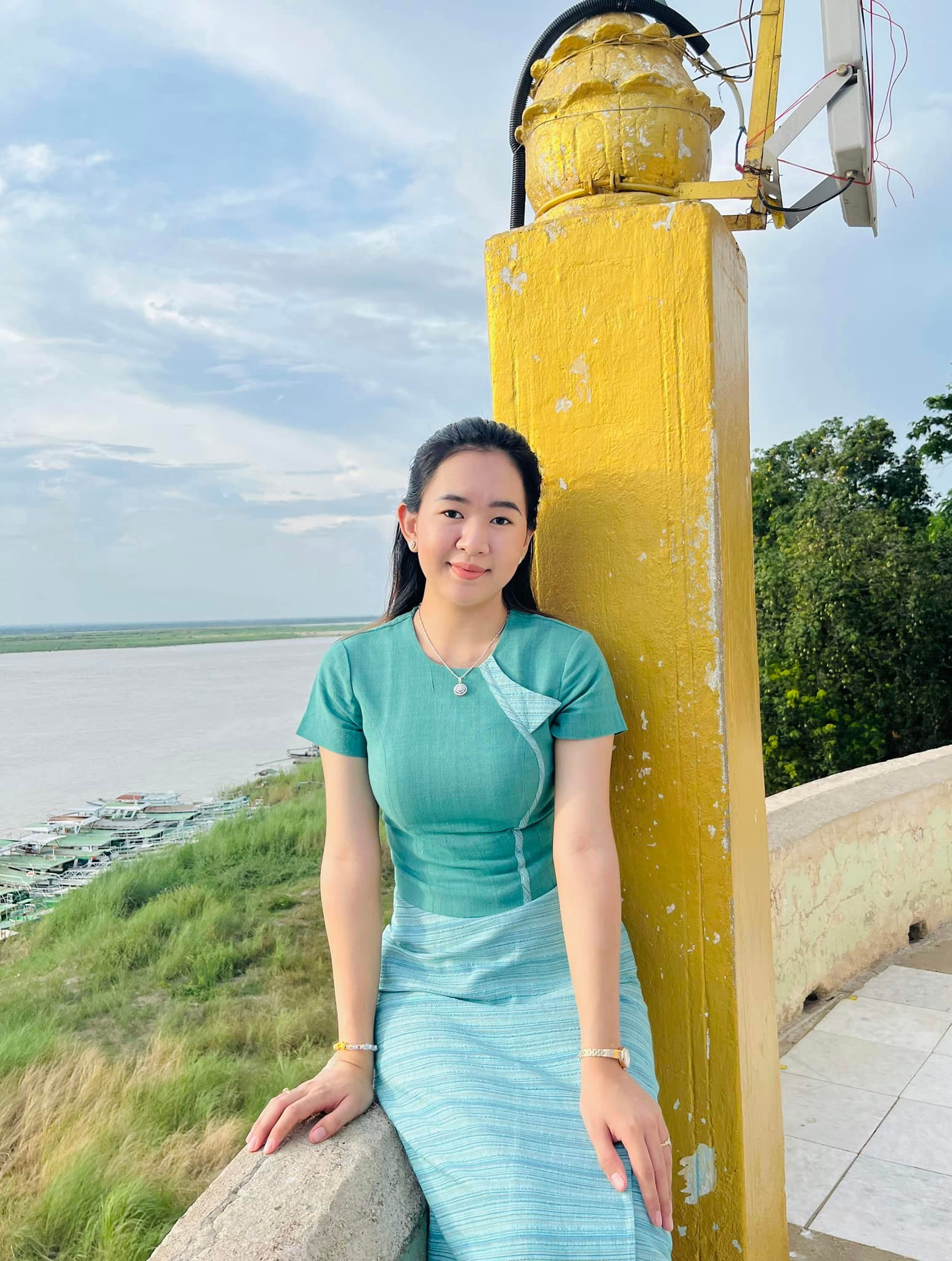
- Aye Mya Phyu in 2020

Background information
- Born: Aye Mya Phyu; 9 March 2003 (age 22); Yangon, Myanmar
- Genres: Pop, Burmese classical music
- Occupation: Singer
- Instruments: Vocals; guitar
- Years active: 2012–present

Aye Mya Phyu (Burmese: အေးမြဖြူ; born 9 March 2003), also known as Moe Tho (မိုးသို), is a Burmese singer, actress and former child star. She became famous after competing in the fourth season of Myanmar Idol and finishing as runner-up.

== Early life and education ==
Aye Mya Phyu was born on 9 March 2003 in Yangon, Myanmar to parents, Myo Zin and Too Too. She is the youngest of two daughters; her elder sister named Aye Chan Phyu. From 2009 to 2018, she attended BEHS 2 Kamayut (St.Augustine). She is currently studying English at Yangon University of Foreign Languages.

== Career ==
=== 2008: Dancing competitions ===
In 2008, at the age of five, she won the first prize with Traditional Dance in a dancing competition at a preschool in Yangon. From then on, she participated in many dancing competitions and she performed traditional dance in many anyeint performances.

=== 2012: Singing competitions ===
She participated with song "Dokalay" and won a gold medal in singing portion of 19th National Performing Arts Competition. She entered in the third season of Starlets' Sky, where she advanced from Level 1 to Level 6 and ultimately she won first place.

=== 2019: Myanmar Idol competition ===
She competed in the fourth season of Myanmar Idol. She passed Judges Audition, Golden week Theater round 1, Group Song Week in Treater round 2 of Golden Week, Solo Round, Green Mile and she was chosen top 11 finalist. And she passed eight weeks, Favourite Song Week, Rock Music Week, Memorial University Song Week, Country Music Week, Soe Lwin Lwin's Song Week, Winter Song Week, Popular Song Week, Burmese Film Theme Song honorable for 100th Anniversary of Burmese Film and Strengthen Song Week. Then she reached to Grand Final and competed with Esther Dawt Chin Sung, Benjamin Sum and Esther became winner and she finished as the runner-up together with Benjamin Sum.

=== 2020–present: Music concert activities and new song ===
After celebrated Myanmar Idol competition, she sang in VX Classic 2020 Grandbodybuilding concert. She performed with songs in Eushido Myanmar's Event. In promoted event of Sein Nan Daw, she perform with song and quiz with her fans. She sang in universities' fresher welcome and event from countryside. And she was invited for MMID Music Concert and sang with two songs. She also sang in Grand Hanthar's event in Mandalay and Oramin-C promoted Event in Yangon. In opening ceremony for Shwe Settaw Pagoda festival, she sang many songs. She performed with songs in Zumba For Charity 2020 Event. So, she sang in many invitation party, concert and ceremony and she owned audiences' hearts.

On August 21, 2020, she sang the song "Myet Wun Lae Pyar Pyar", the movie theme song of Hmone Shwe Yee film at the music concert held in celebration of the 100th Anniversary of Burmese Film.

On September 18, 2020, she also sang the song "Phoo Sar Lan Sone", the movie theme song of Phoo Sar Lan Sone film and then she performed with traditional dance while Yan Aung was singing the song "Hmone Shwe Yee", the movie theme song of Hmone Shwe Yee film at the music concert held in celebration of the 100th Anniversary of Burmese Film.

She sang the song "Thet Thant Paw Mhar Kasar Mal" at the concert of Shwe FM 11th Anniversary, broadcast on Channel 9, on October 10, 2020.

On November 6, 2020, she sang the song "The Moon From University" at the music concert held in celebration of the 100th Anniversary of Yangon University.

On January 1, 2021, she performed with traditional dance while Wyne La Min Aung was singing the song "Chaw Kalyar" at the music concert held in celebration of the 75th Anniversary of MRTV.

On January 8, 2021, she also sang the song "November Mhar Lar Ma Lar December Mhar Lar Ma Lar" at the music concert held in celebration of the 75th Anniversary of Myanmar Radio and Television.

Her single song "Lwan Nay Loh", released on 26 June 2020, has long been placed at number one on Melo's top 100 chart. Also her single song "Naw", released on 16 August 2020, has been placed at number one on Melo's top 100 chart. Her song "Brand New Love" from her music series, released on 15 January 2021, has been placed at number 1 on Joox's Myanmar top 100 chart. On 7 July 202, she was featured in Oak Soe Khant's single "Stage of Vows, New Road to Nibbana" (အဓိဌာန်စခန်း နိဗ္ဗာန်လမ်းသစ်), based on classical Burmese music (Mahagita).

== Competition songs in Myanmar Idol ==
- Judges Audition: She competed with song, "He was cruel" and she got "Yeses" from all three judges and she owned golden ticket for step up to next stage.
- Golden Week Treater Round 1: She competed with song, "Lord" and she was chosen by judges for the next stage Treater Round 2.
- Golden Week Treater Round 2: Group Song Week: She competed with song, "Min Ye A Yate Ka Lay" with Benjamin Sum, Brown@Myat Thura Zaw, Htet Inzali and all contestants of her group were chosen by judges for Solo Round of the next stage.
- Golden Week Treater Round 3: Solo Round, Green Mile: She competed with song, "Unbelievable" and she walked through Green Mile to judges for heard of result. And judges chose her for Top 11 Finalist.
- 1st Live: Favourite Song Week: Her voting number was 77711 and she participated with song, "Let me miss you" on performance show night. And she was clearly through to next stage on result show night by people's votes.
- 2nd Live: Rock Music Week: She participated with Rock Music, "Eyes that see and cry" and she was again clearly through to the next round by voting of people around Myanmar and International country.
- 3rd Live: Memorial University Song Week: She competed with Burmese classical music, "The Moon from University" and clearly passed to next stage by voting of many people.
- 4th Live: Country Music Week: She participated with country music, "Days that were bright" and she was again clearly through.
- 5th Live: Soe Lwin Lwin's Song week of remembrance for him: She competed with Soe Lwin Lwin's song, "Imagnation for lover" on performance show night. And she sat down on bottom on result show night. And then she resaved from bottom and she through to next stage.
- 6th Live: Winter Song Week: She participated with Winter Song, "This winter night" and she again sat down on bottom and resaved.
- 7th Live: Popular Song Week: She participated with song, "I'm OK" on performance show and she was clearly through to the next stage.
- 8th Live: Burmese Film Theme Song and Strengthening Song Week: She competed with Burmese film theme song, "Myet Won Lae Pyar Pyar" and strengthening song, "Heaven Mother". And she was step up to Grand Final.
- Grand Final: She participated with judges selection song, "I'll have a boyfriend next year" and selection song of herself, "Pin Tai San A Twat A Chit Ye A Lin Yaung" and Winner Song, "White" written by Wai Gyi. And she only finished as runner-up by difference of voting result.

== Discography ==
=== Singles ===
- Lwan Nay Loh (လွမ်းနေလို့) (26.6.2020)
- Naw (နော်) (16.8.2020)
- Brand New Love (15.1.2021)
- Moe Nae A Tu (မိုးနဲ့အတူ) (18.1.2021)
- A Nar Nar Shi Chin (အနားနားရှိချင်) (22.1.2021)

== Filmography ==
=== Direct-to-video ===
Lists of Movies
Year	English title	Burmese title	Director	Co-Stars
2010	Meeting with Ghosts	တစ္ဆေများနှင့်တွေ့ဆုံခြင်း	Maung Myo Min (Yin Twin Phit)	Moe Yan Zun, Chit Thu Wai, Warso Moe Oo
2011	Chit Lo Soe Dar	ချစ်လို့ဆိုးတာ	Ban Gyi	Nay Min, Wyne Su Khine Thein, Soe Moe Kyi, Theingi Htun
2012	Tit Nae Paung Dae Tit	တစ်နဲ့ပေါင်းတဲ့တစ်	Thein Han (Phoenix)	Kyaw Ye Aung, Soe Myat Thuzar

=== Film (Cinema) ===
Lists of Movies
Year	English title	Burmese title	Director	Co-Stars	Note
2010	Burmeton	ဘာမီတွန်	Khin Maung Oo & Soe Thein Htut	Yan Aung, Htun Eaindra Bo, Nay Toe, Thet Mon Myint	
2015	Bo Ma	ဘိုမ	Na Gyi	Ye Deight, Phway Phway	
TBA	Chit Khin Sa Maw Yone	ချစ်ခင်စမှော်ရုံ	Na Gyi	Daung, Kyaw Htet Aung, Moe Hay Ko, Paing Phyo Thu	still shooting
TBA	Mya Kay Khine Min Yee Lae	မြကေခိုင်မင်ရည်လဲ့	Aww Yata	Kyaw Ye Aung, A Linn Yaung, Htoo Aung, Kyaw Kyaw, Myo Thadar Htun, Thet Mon Myint, Soe Moe Kyi, Han Lay, Hsu Myat Noe Oo	still shooting

=== Television series ===
Year	English title	Burmese title	Director	Co-stars	Network
2017	Chit Chin Ko Phan Sin Thu	ချစ်ခြင်းကိုဖန်ဆင်းသူ	May Tin (MG)	Kaung Pyae, Shwe Hmone Yati, Kaung Set Htoo, Thel Naw Zar, Lu Lu, Shwe Poe Eain, Hnin Hnin Htet Wai, Htun Htun Win, Than Than Soe, Theingi Htun	MWD Documentary Channel

== Award ==
- Joox Top 10 Popular Song Award for 2020
