= Yangon City FM Awards =

Music awards

- Awarded for: Album sales; popularity; musical excellence
- Location: Myanmar Convention Centre, Yangon
- Country: Myanmar
- Presented by: Yangon City FM
- First award: Since 2002

The Yangon City FM Music Awards are annual music awards organised by Yangon City FM, a radio station owned by the Yangon City Development Committee, the city's municipal corporation. The awards ceremony is held at the Myanmar Convention Centre. The highly coveted awards were first held in 2002. Several awards are given on the basis of albums sales volumes in the Yangon metropolitan region.

== Winners by year ==
The award winners from 2002 to 2020 are listed below:

=== 1st annual awards (2002) ===
- Audience Choice and Bestselling Traditional Burmese Album Producer – Khin Zabe U
- Audience Choice and Bestselling Album Producer – Master
- Audience Choice and Bestselling Traditional Burmese Female Vocalist – Soe Sandar Tun
- Audience Choice and Bestselling Traditional Burmese Male Vocalist – Min Naung
- Audience Choice and Bestselling Female Album – Htun Eindra Bo
- Audience Choice and Bestselling Male Album – Y Wine
- Most Popular Vocalist – Graham

=== 3rd annual awards (2004) ===
- Bestselling Traditional Burmese Album Producer – Ko Dollar
- Bestselling Album Producer – Ko Ko Lwin
- Bestselling Traditional Burmese Female Vocalist – Poe Ei San
- Bestselling Traditional Burmese Male Vocalist – None
- Bestselling Female Vocalist – Htun Eindra Bo
- Bestselling Male Vocalist – Myo Gyi
- Most Popular Female Vocalist – Htun Eindra Bo
- Most Popular Male Vocalist – R Zarni
- Most Successful Musical Group – NO!

=== 4th annual awards (2005) ===
- Bestselling Traditional Burmese Album Producer – Cho Kyi Thar
- Bestselling Album Producer – Ne Mye Thit
- Bestselling Traditional Burmese Female Vocalist – None
- Bestselling Traditional Burmese Male Vocalist – Khin Maung Toe
- Bestselling Female Vocalist – None
- Bestselling Male Vocalist – R Zarni
- Most Popular Female Vocalist – Htun Eindra Bo
- Most Popular Male Vocalist – R Zarni
- Most Successful Musical Group – 'Examplez' Htun Htun

=== 5th annual awards (2006) ===
- Bestselling Traditional Burmese Album Producer – Cho Kyi Thar
- Bestselling Album Producer – Iron Cross
- Bestselling Traditional Burmese Female Vocalist – Poe Ei San
- Bestselling Traditional Burmese Male Vocalist – None
- Bestselling Female Vocalist – None
- Bestselling Male Vocalist – Sai Sai Kham Leng
- Most Popular Female Vocalist – L Seng Zi
- Most Popular Male Vocalist – R Zarni
- Most Successful Musical Group – IMP

=== 6th annual awards (2007) ===
- Bestselling Traditional Burmese Album Producer – Myoma
- Bestselling Album Producer – Excellent Creation
- Bestselling Traditional Burmese Female Vocalist – Soe Sandar Tun
- Bestselling Traditional Burmese Male Vocalist – None
- Bestselling Female Vocalist – Phyu Phyu Kyaw Thein
- Bestselling Male Vocalist – Sai Sai Kham Leng
- Most Popular Female Vocalist – L Seng Zi
- Most Popular Male Vocalist – R Zarni
- Most Successful Musical Group – Black Hole

=== 7th annual awards (2008) ===
- Bestselling Traditional Burmese Album Producer – Gaba Kyaw
- Bestselling Album Producer – Soe Thet Aung
- Bestselling Traditional Burmese Female Vocalist – Soe Sandar Tun
- Bestselling Traditional Burmese Male Vocalist – Banyar Han
- Bestselling Female Vocalist – L Seng Zi
- Bestselling Male Vocalist – Naw Naw
- Most Popular Female Vocalist – None
- Most Popular Male Vocalist – R Zarni
- Most Successful Musical Group – None

=== 8th annual awards (2009) ===
- Bestselling Traditional Burmese Album Producer – Gaba Kyaw
- Bestselling Album Producer – Han Htun
- Bestselling Traditional Burmese Female Vocalist – None
- Bestselling Traditional Burmese Male Vocalist – Banyar Han
- Bestselling Female Vocalist – Wyne Su Khine Thein
- Bestselling Male Vocalist – Han Htun
- Most Popular Female Vocalist – L Seng Zi
- Most Popular Male Vocalist – R Zarni
- Most Successful Musical Group – Black Hole

=== 9th annual awards (2010) ===
- Bestselling Traditional Burmese Album Producer – Cho Kyi Thar
- Bestselling Album Producer – Master
- Bestselling Traditional Burmese Female Vocalist – Poe Ei San
- Bestselling Traditional Burmese Male Vocalist – None
- Bestselling Female Vocalist – Chan Chan
- Bestselling Male Vocalist – Ye Lay
- Most Popular Female Vocalist – Athen Cho Swe
- Most Popular Male Vocalist – R Zarni
- Most Successful Musical Group – None

=== 10th annual awards (2011) ===
- Bestselling Traditional Burmese Album Producer – Gaba Kyaw
- Bestselling Album Producer – May Thaw
- Bestselling Traditional Burmese Female Vocalist – None
- Bestselling Traditional Burmese Male Vocalist – Banyar Han
- Bestselling Female Vocalist – Chan Chan
- Bestselling Male Vocalist – R Zarni
- Most Popular Female Vocalist – Chan Chan
- Most Popular Male Vocalist – Aung La
- Most Successful Musical Group – Reason

=== 11th annual awards (2012) ===
- Bestselling Traditional Burmese Album Producer – Hlaing
- Bestselling Album Producer – May Phyu
- Bestselling Traditional Burmese Female Vocalist – Mar Mar Aye
- Bestselling Traditional Burmese Male Vocalist – None
- Bestselling Female Vocalist – Wyne Su Khine Thein
- Bestselling Male Vocalist – So Tay
- Most Popular Female Vocalist – Wyne Su Khine Thein
- Most Popular Male Vocalist – Bunny Phyoe
- Most Successful Musical Group – Idiots

=== 12th annual awards (2013) ===
- Bestselling Traditional Burmese Album Producer – Khun Htun Maung
- Bestselling Album Producer – CMP
- Bestselling Traditional Burmese Female Vocalist – Poe Ei San
- Bestselling Traditional Burmese Male Vocalist – None
- Bestselling Female Vocalist – Wyne Su Khine Thein
- Bestselling Male Vocalist – Sai Sai Kham Leng
- Most Popular Female Vocalist – Sandi Myint Lwin
- Most Popular Male Vocalist – Bunny Phyoe
- Most Successful Musical Group – Wanted

=== 13th annual awards (2014) ===
- Bestselling Traditional Burmese Album Producer – Khun Htun Maung
- Bestselling Album Producer – Frenzo Music Production
- Bestselling Traditional Burmese Female Vocalist – Poe Ei San
- Bestselling Traditional Burmese Male Vocalist – Wai Moe
- Bestselling Female Vocalist – Wyne Su Khine Thein
- Bestselling Male Vocalist – Bunny Phyoe
- Most Popular Female Vocalist – Ni Ni Khin Zaw
- Most Popular Male Vocalist – Hlwan Paing
- Most Successful Musical Group – None

=== 14th annual awards (2015) ===
- Bestselling Traditional Burmese Album Producer – TNW Music Production
- Bestselling Album Producer – H&M Music Production
- Bestselling Traditional Burmese Female Vocalist – May Thet Htar Swe
- Bestselling Traditional Burmese Male Vocalist – Waing Lamin Aung
- Bestselling Female Vocalist – Ni Ni Khin Zaw
- Bestselling Male Vocalist – Wai La
- Most Popular Female Vocalist – Ni Ni Khin Zaw
- Most Popular Male Vocalist – Ye Yint Aung
- Most Successful Musical Group – None

=== 15th annual awards (2016) ===
- Bestselling Traditional Burmese Album Producer – Nu Nu Yi
- Bestselling Album Producer – Pyone
- Bestselling Traditional Burmese Female Vocalist – Win Lae Cherry
- Bestselling Traditional Burmese Male Vocalist – Than Pe Lay
- Bestselling Female Vocalist – Mi Sandi
- Bestselling Male Vocalist – Shwe Htoo
- Most Popular Female Vocalist – Ni Ni Khin Zaw
- Most Popular Male Vocalist – Wai La
- Most Successful Musical Group – None

=== 16th annual awards (2017) ===
- Bestselling Traditional Burmese Album Producer – Hlaing
- Bestselling Album Producer – TZM
- Bestselling Traditional Burmese Female Vocalist – None
- Bestselling Traditional Burmese Male Vocalist – Ant Gyi
- Bestselling Female Vocalist – Tin Zar Maw
- Bestselling Male Vocalist – Hlwan Paing
- Most Popular Female Vocalist – Yadanar My
- Most Popular Male Vocalist – G Fatt
- Most Successful Musical Group – None

=== 17th annual awards (2018) ===
- Bestselling Traditional Burmese Album Producer – Pho Thauk Kyar
- Bestselling Album Producer – Sai Sai Kham Leng
- Bestselling Traditional Burmese Female Vocalist – Shwe Yamin Oo
- Bestselling Traditional Burmese Male Vocalist – Pho Thauk Kyar
- Bestselling Female Vocalist – Irene Zin Mar Myint
- Bestselling Male Vocalist – Sai Sai Kham Leng
- Most Popular Female Vocalist – Ni Ni Khin Zaw
- Most Popular Male Vocalist – Shwe Htoo
- Most Popular New Male Vocalist – Pho Pyae
- Most Popular New Female Vocalist – Kay Kay Moe

=== 18th annual awards (2019) ===
- Bestselling Traditional Burmese Album Producer – KMA
- Bestselling Album Producer – Zenn Kyi
- Bestselling Traditional Burmese Female Vocalist – Soe Sandar Tun
- Bestselling Traditional Burmese Male Vocalist – None
- Bestselling Female Vocalist – Jewel
- Bestselling Male Vocalist – Wai La
- Most Popular Female Vocalist – Wyne Su Khine Thein
- Most Popular Male Vocalist – G-Fatt
- Most Popular New Vocalist – Eternal Gosh!

=== 19th annual awards (2020) ===
- Bestselling Traditional Burmese Album Producer – None
- Bestselling Album Producer – None
- Best Traditional Burmese Female Vocalist – Barbara
- Best Traditional Burmese Male Vocalist – None
- Best Female Vocalist – May La Than Zin
- Best Male Vocalist – None
- Most Popular Female Vocalist – Ni Ni Khin Zaw
- Most Popular Male Vocalist – Phyo Myat Aung
- Most Popular New Vocalist – Dr. Phyo Wai Lin

== See also ==
- Music of Myanmar
