= Basic Education High School No. 2 Kamayut =

Coordinates: 16.8220°N 96.1390°E

Kamayut 2 High School
- အ.ထ.က. (၂) ကမာရွတ်

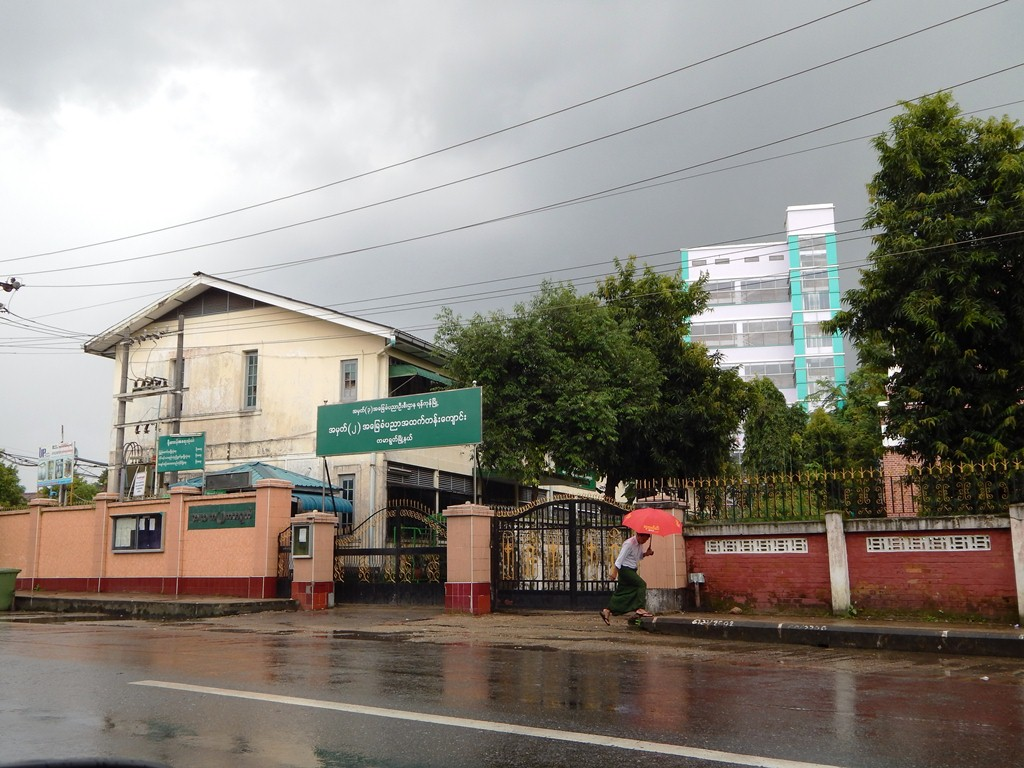
- Basic Education High School No. 2 Kamayut

Location
- 64, Inya Road, Kamayut; Yangon, Yangon Region; Myanmar

Information
- Type: Public
- Motto: ခေတ်မီဖွံ့ဖြိုးတိုးတက်သော နိုင်ငံတော်ကြီးကို တည်ဆောက်အံ့ (We will build a modernized and developed country)
- School number: 2
- Principal: Dr Wathan Myat Thin
- Grades: Kindergarten to Grade 12
- Colors: White and Green
- Nickname: St. Augustine

Basic Education High School No. 2 Kamayut (Burmese: အခြေခံ ပညာ အထက်တန်း ကျောင်း အမှတ် (၂) ကမာရွတ်; abbreviated to အ.ထ.က. (၂) ကမာရွတ်; formerly, State High School Kamayut or St. Augustine's School; commonly known as Kamayut 2 High School) is one of the best-known public high schools located in Kamayut Township, Yangon, Myanmar (formerly Burma). The school offers classes from kindergarten to 11th standard (Grade 1 to Grade 12).

== Notable alumni ==
=== Actors ===
- Phway Phway
- Wutt Hmone Shwe Yi
- Nang Mwe San
- Ei Chaw Po
- Mya Hnin Yee Lwin

=== Singers ===
- Soe Lwin Lwin
- Khine Htoo
- Si Thu Lwin
- Shwe Htoo
- Aye Mya Phyu
- Waing Lamin Aung
