= Benjamin Sum =

Burmese singer

Benjamin Sum ဘင်ဂျမင်ဆုမ်း
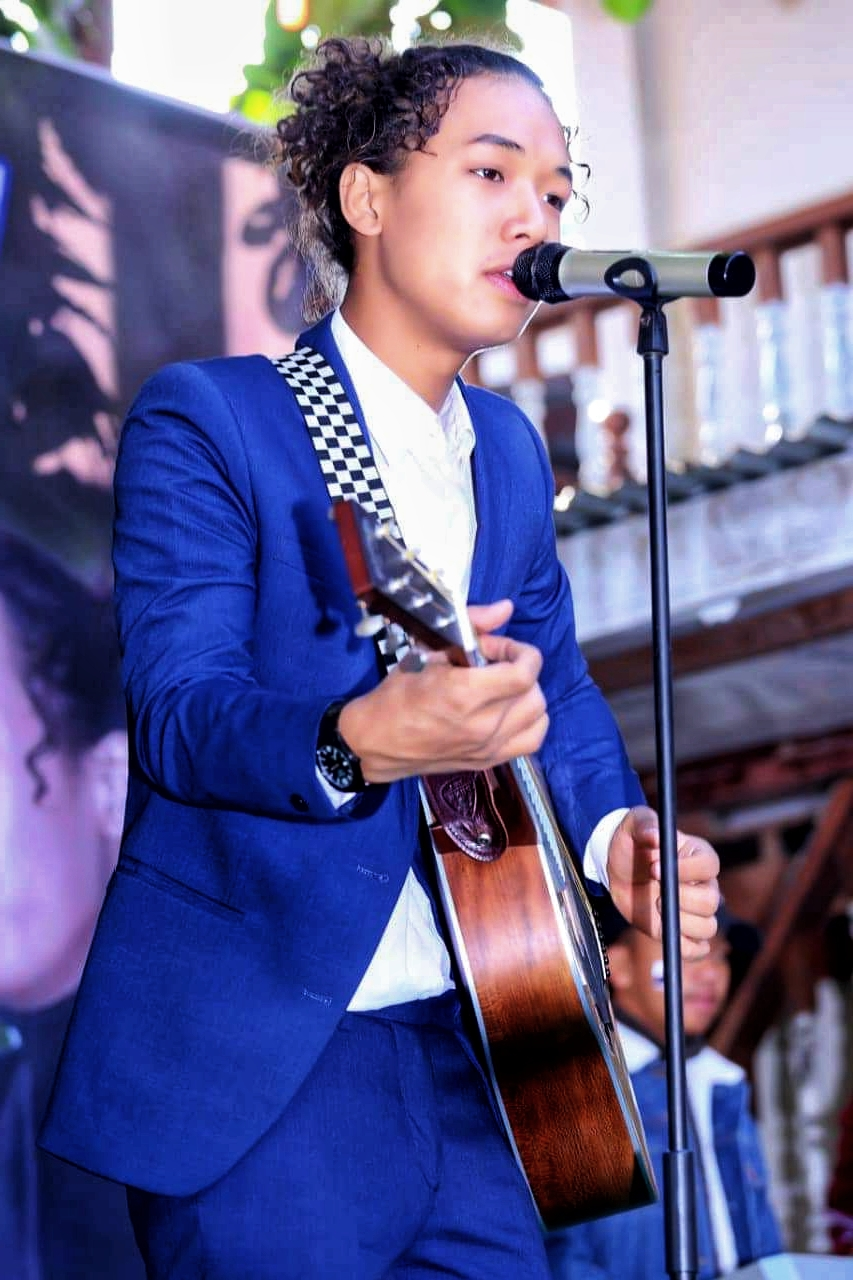
- Benjamin Sum in 2020

Background information
- Born: Benjamin Sum; 27 November 2000 (age 25); Kalay, Sagaing Region, Myanmar
- Genres: Pop, pop rock
- Occupation: Singer
- Instruments: Vocals; guitar
- Years active: 2019–present

Benjamin Sum (Burmese: ဘင်ဂျမင်ဆုမ်း; born 27 November 2000) is a Burmese singer of ethnic Chin descent. He rose to public recognition following his finish as the runner-up on the fourth season of Myanmar Idol. However, his rise to stardom is attributed to his cover of a Mizo love song "Chhailai Di Lenna" on YouTube in 2021.

Following threats from the Myanmar Army after the 2021 Myanmar coup d'état, Sum became a refugee in Mizoram, India. Adapting to the Mizo dialect, his first song earned him "Best Male Artist" awards at Ṭhazual and "Singer of the Year (Male)" at Lelte Awards in 2021.

In 2023, he was surrounded by a controversy as he was found to possess forged Indian documents including birth certificate, electoral voter identity, Aadhaar and driving license. Investigations led to uncovering other cases of counterfeit documents among the refugees in Mizoram. Upon public pressure, Sum surrendered all his Indian documents to the Government of Mizoram.

== Early life and education ==
Benjamin Sum was born on 27 November 2000 in Kalay, Sagaing Region, Myanmar. His father, Lalhmuaklian was a Christian missionary and died when he was four years old. His younger sister, eight years his junior, died at the age of four when, at the same time his mother, Laldinpari was diagnosed with stage three cancer. Benjamin was then in middle school. His life story shocked the Myanmar audience as he stepped into the 2019 season of Myanmar Idol as a contestant. He was then studying Computer Science at the University of Computer Studies, Kalay.

== Career ==
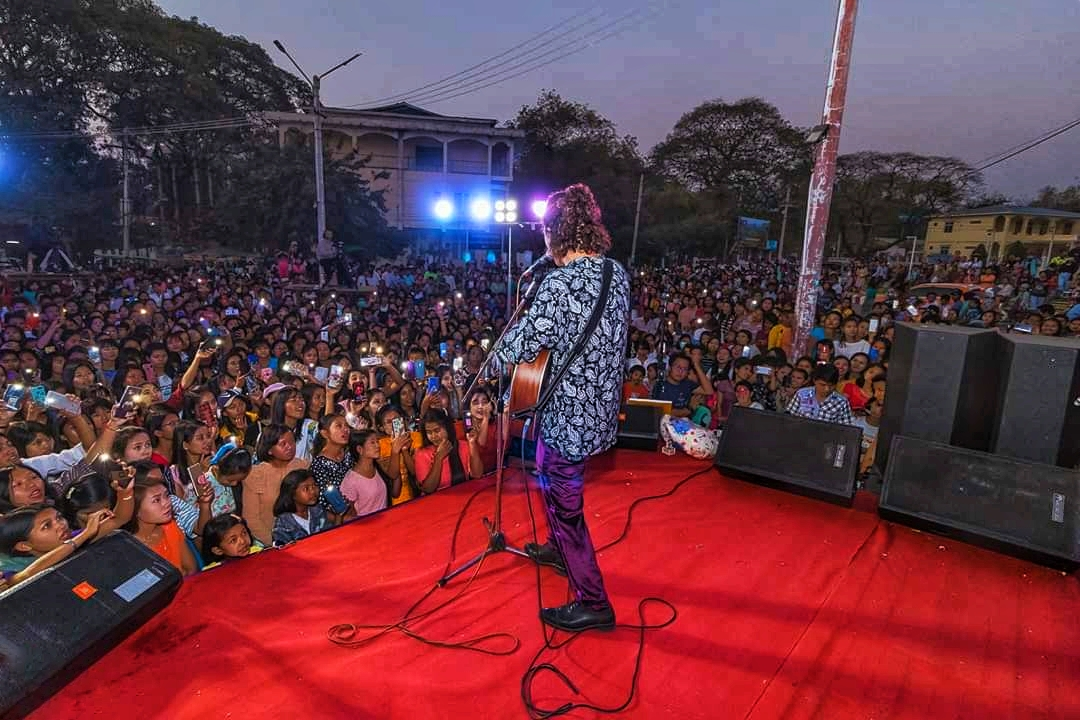
Benjamin Sum performing in a concert

=== Myanmar Idol ===
Ben started performing in public in 2018. He wanted to pursue a career in music, and so he auditioned for the fourth season of Myanmar Idol. Finally, he was selected in Top 11 finalists.

He made the grand final on the weekend of 28 December 2019, alongside Esther Dawt Chin Sung and Aye Mya Phyu. After Esther was declared the winner, he finished as the runner-up with over 50% of the public vote. During his homecoming to Kalay, a huge crowd of thousand fans gathered.

After competing Myanmar Idol, he started his tour to different cities in Myanmar. He began shooting for commercial advertisements, stage performances, and preparing to record his first solo album.

On 18 May 2020, he released a single song called "Pyan Twae Mae Yat" MV on Facebook which earned one million views within 24 hours and then two million views in 5 days. Also it has long been number one on Joox's top 100 chart.

He also went to Australia to help the victims of the Australia bushfires and raised a charity for them just before the COVID-19 pandemic in January 2020. During the pandemic, he spent his days making songs and released a few of them which got charted No.1 in Joox. Despite his passion for making more music, he wasn't able to produce it due to the military regime.

=== Mizoram journey ===
In February 2021, a military coup overtook the government of Myanmar and the country came under a military regime. Sum was involved in the protest against the new government which exercised martial law on its citizens, and became one of the key figures in the civilian activism. The Myanmar Army issued his seizure under the Penal Code of 1861 which would lead to years of imprisonment. From Falam, where he was living at the time, he fled to India with his ailing mother in March 2021. After three days of journey, he and his mother joined his grandparents who had settled in Aizawl, the capital of Mizoram.

Living in Mizoram as a foreigner, he found it hard to make earning to support his family performing at various venues, and then decided to start a YouTube channel. To attract Mizo viewers, he had to learn the dialect used in Mizoram, which is distinct from his native dialect. After mastering the Mizo dialect, he released his first cover "Chhailai Di Lenna", a Mizo love song written by Lalthangliana Pautu and polularised by Lalsangzuali Sailo. Made in collaboration with a fellow Burmese musician, Thangbawiha Chhakchhuak, it was dedicated for charity for civilians in Myanmar. This was the turning point of his career in the Mizo music industry, and became a "recognisable celebrity." A fan-based account "Summers" was opened in an Instagram through which his song earned further popularity. He later donated all the money received from the song through YouTube and contributions from Summers to the Burmese refugees.

Sum then proceeded to make a music video "Tunah Erawh Zawng" from which he was noticed by a Mizo producer, Rpa Ralte and got connected via YouTube comments. Since then, he has been performing in various platforms and even won the "Best Male Artist" in Ṭhazual and Lelte Awards in 2021, the very same year he fled from Myanmar to Mizoram.

In April 2022, Sum released on YouTube an original song called "Chhingmitin Biahthu Kan Hlan", which had 0.7 million views ain one month and five million views in two years. The song rose to top of the chart on Voltas Malsawm Ṭhazual Lengzem in May 2022. He also worked with one of the biggest record labels in Mizoram, Kings & Prophets, which released his first English original song "Angel". He introduced himself as a grunge-punk artist and shocked the public with his new genre. He then released another music video "Sam Ang Then Zai I Rel Tawh Mai Ang", which impressed a number of listeners in Mizoram with the melodramatic lyrics, tune and the swooning vocals. He also worked with another talented artist, Saiwanah Sailo in a song "Khuanu Malsawmna" which became a successful hit.

=== Extended play ===
After releasing different singles, Sum released an all-English EP named Out of the Blue on 9 December 2022, which includes the songs: "Cancer", "Fire", "Song for You", "Feelings", "I Wish", and "Run Away". The content in this EP were all composed by him wherein he drew his inspiration from the people who are currently suffering a crisis back in his hometown. The genre in this EP is all Indie-pop-punk. While making this EP, Radwimps, Girl in Red, One OK Rock and Blink-182 were his muse.

=== Orange Music Festival ===
In December 2022, Sum performed along with his band at Orange Festival in Dambuk, Arunachal Pradesh, India, and got featured in the Rolling Stone India with the description: "Myanmar-born, Mizoram artist Benjamin Sum – who had recently released his EP Out of the Blue – brought a raggedy pop-punk edge to the festival, matching the comedic heaviness of Green Day with jangly-pop and moving on to Radiohead-esque melancholy on "False Hope"." He included his most famous Mizo ballad to date,"Chhingmitin Biahthu Kan Hlan", as a major presentation.

== Controversy ==
A refugee in Mizoram, Sum became a successful singer, making earnings from his public performances and online streaming platforms. In April 2023, Sum was seen riding a new motorcycle in Aizawl. Out of curiosity, Zomuanpuia Tlau (ZMP Tlau), a freelance journalist, noted the registration plate and found that the vehicle was registered in Sum's name. In India, one has to be a bona fide citizen to own a vehicle and should be registered using citizenship verifications such as electoral voter identity card and Aadhaar, among others. Specifically in Aizawl, the government requires a garage certificate to own any vehicle that is certified by the local administrator (Local Council) and approved by the Transport Department of Mizoram since 2017. Following the immigration of refugees from Myanmar, the Indian government had mandated state administrators not to issue any kind of identity cards to refugees.

On investigating how Sum got a vehicle registration and garage license, Tlau discovered that Sum had an Indian voter card, Aadhaar, driving license, as well as birth certificate. The birth certificate indicated that it was issued in 2005 and Sum was born in Farkawn, a village in Champhai district near Myanmar. Inquiry to the village authorities revealed that Sum was not registered in Farkawn. Young Mizo Association (YMA) branch of Farkawn made a press statement that Sum was not born there, proving that the certificate was forged.

The news created a national furore and debate as other Burmese refugees were found to possess similar counterfeit documents. While fans sympathised and defended Sum, YMA, as the largest organisation in Mizoram, intervened making a public statement that there had been a series of forgeries for Indian documents among the refugees. From YMA investigation, it was known that many refugees obtained Indian documents at the border, a single document usually at the price of INR 8,000. The controversy was feared to have a negative impact on how the refugees were received in Mizoram, such that the Central YMA urged the citizens not to take up further grudges against Sum and others who had fake documents. Sum himself never disclosed how he acquired the counterfeit documents, and got "popular for all the wrong reasons", as North East Live reported. Amidst the public outcry, he was forced to surrender his documents to the government authorities in late April 2023, making a public apology "for hurting the sentiments of the people."

== Myanmar Idol songs ==
- Week 1: He sang "Mother How are You" in Burmese version and started to win appreciation from the viewers.
- Week 2: He sang "Ma Tar Nae" (မတားနဲ့) which makes him the most popular contestant.
- Week 3: He chose the song "Adipati Lanma Ka Chay Yar Myar" (အဓိပတိလမ်းမကခြေရာများ), Casablanca in Burmese version, for the week of College Student life.
- Week 4: He chose the song "Min Ma Shi Tae Nya Tway" (မင်းမရှိတဲ့နေ့တွေ ညတွေ) in country theme.
- Week 5: He sang "Sate Pyay Thachin" (စိတ်ဖြေသီချင်း) the week to the remembrance of the iconic singer Soe Lwin Lwin.
- Week 6: He sang "December Na Nat Khin" (ဒီဇင်ဘာနံနက်ခင်း) for winter theme and he became a top 5 finalist.
- Week 7: He sang "Say" (ဆေး) for popular song week and is chosen as one of the top 4 finalists.

== Discography ==
=== Singles ===
- "The Day We Meet Again" (ပြန်တွေ့မယ့်ရက်) (2020).
- "Girl from the House Next Door" (ဟိုဖက်အိမ်ကကောင်မလေး) (2020)
- "Chhingmitin Biahthu Kan Hlan" (in Mizo, 2021)
- "Sam Ang Then Zai I Rel Tawh Mai Ang" (in Mizo, 2022)

=== Album ===
- Out of the Blue (2022)

== Awards ==
- 2020, Joox "Top 10 Popular Song Award"
- 2020, Joox "Myanmar Half Year Artist Award" (rank 1)
- 2020, Shwe FM Music Award "Most Requested Song on Shwe FM"
- 2020, Chin TV Award "Chin Artist of the Year"
- 2020, Padamyar FM "Song of the Year Award"
- 2021, Chin TV Award "Chin Person of the Year"
- 2021, 7th Annual Ṭhazual Award "Best Male Artist (Lengzem)"
- 2021, Hakha Times Award "Chin Young Person of the Year"
- 2021, Lelte Award "Singer of the Year (Male)"
- 2022, Chin TV Award "Chin Humanitarian Award" (Guys from Chin)
- 2022, ChinTube Award "Most Influential Award" (Guys from Chin)
- 2022, Moonlight Award "Male Singer of the Year (Mizoram)"
