= Kaung Kaung =

Burmese male singer

Kaung Kaung ကောင်းကောင်း
- Born: Burma
- Genres: Pop
- Occupation: Singer-songwriter
- Instrument: Vocals
- Years active: 2008–present

Kaung Kaung (Burmese: ကောင်းကောင်း) is a Burmese pop singer-songwriter of Karen descent, best known for his hit ballad, "Be Happy." He was mentored by songwriter KAT. Kaung Kaung debuted in 2008, on the singing competition, Melody World. In 2018, he released his second album, The Good in the Bad. In 2019, he won Shwe FM's award for most requested male artist. In 2021, he collaborated with Wai La in the single "Ma Pat Thet Ne" (မပတ်သက်နဲ့).

== Discography ==
- The Good in the Bad (အဆိုးထဲကအကောင်း) (2018)

== Personal life ==
Kaung was born in Yangon and was always interested in Music from young days.
