= Waing Lamin Aung =

Burmese male singer

Waing Lamin Aung ဝိုင်းလမင်းအောင်
- Born: 1999 (age 26–27); Myanmar
- Genres: Mahāgīta; Burmese country; dhamma
- Occupation: Singer
- Instrument: Vocals
- Years active: 2012–present

Waing Lamin Aung (Burmese: ဝိုင်းလမင်းအောင်; born 1999, also spelt Wine Lamin Aung) is a traditional Burmese classical, country, and dhamma singer. A child singer, he competed in Starlet's Sky, a children's singing competition broadcast on Myawaddy TV. He was mentored by renowned classical vocalist Min Naung. In 2015, he received the Yangon City FM Award for Bestselling Traditional Burmese Male Vocalist for his album, May You Be Fulfilled (ပြည့်စုံနိုင်ပါစေ). He graduated from Basic Education High School No. 2 Kamayut, after transferring from Basic Education High School No. 3 Botataung in the ninth grade. As of February 2020, he attended the National University of Arts and Culture, Yangon, studying music.

== Discography ==
- May You Be Fulfilled (ပြည့်စုံနိုင်ပါစေ) (2015)

== Awards ==
- 2015 - Yangon City FM Award for Bestselling Traditional Burmese Male Vocalist
