= Banyar Han =

Burmese male singer

Banyar Han ဗညားဟန်
- Born: Burma
- Genres: Burmese country
- Occupation: Singer
- Instrument: Vocals
- Years active: 2002–present
- Website: Banyar Han on Facebook

Banyar Han (Burmese: ဗညားဟန်, also spelt Ba Nyar Han) is a traditional Burmese country singer. A schoolteacher by training, he has released dozens of albums throughout his career since his debut in 2002. Banyar Han broke into the music industry with the assistance of singer Soe Sandar Tun. As of 2020, he has received 3 Yangon City FM Awards. His song "Taung Yar Win Chain" (တောင်ယာဝင်ချိန်) is a popular song that describes the period of traditional hill-side cultivation in the countryside.

== Discography ==
- War So Moe Nae Pyan Kae Par (ဝါဆိုမိုးနဲ့ပြန်ခဲ့ပါ) (2006)
- Pan Chway Taw Moe (ပန်းခြွေသောမိုး) (2009)
- A Waso to Miss (လွမ်းရတဲ့ဝါဆို) (2016)
- Chit Mhar Lar (ချစ်မှာလား) (duo with Soe Sandar Tun)
- Nha Ko Tu A Chit (နှစ်ကိုယ်တူအချစ်) (duo with Seint Naychi)
- Ma Li Kha Chit Thu (မလိခချစ်သူ)
- Moe Thae Nya A Lwan Panchi (မိုးသည်းညအလွမ်းပန်းချီ)
- ‌Shwe Nae Yoe Mhar Sout Taw Thar (ရွှေနဲ့ယိုးမှား စောက်တောသား)

== Awards ==
- 2008 - Yangon City FM Award for Bestselling Traditional Burmese Male Vocalist
- 2009 - Yangon City FM Award for Bestselling Traditional Burmese Male Vocalist
- 2011 - Yangon City FM Award for Bestselling Traditional Burmese Male Vocalist

== Personal life ==
Banyar Han is based in Magway Region, where he owns a store.
