= Myanmar Idol season 4 =

Fourth season of Myanmar Idol

Myanmar Idol
- Season 4
- Hosted by: Kyaw Htet Aung
- Judges: Aung Ko Latt; Tin Zar Maw; Phyu Phyu Kyaw Thein
- Winner: Esther Dawt Chin Sung
- Runners-up: Aye Mya Phyu; Benjamin Sum
- Finals venue: Haxagon Complex
- Wild Card Winner: Tan Khun Kyaw

Release
- Original network: Channel 9
- Original release: September 6 – December 28, 2019

Season chronology
- ← Previous; Season 3

The fourth season of Myanmar Idol premiered on September 6, 2019 and continued until December 28, 2019. It was won by Esther Dawt Chin Sung. The fourth season was co-hosted by Kyaw Htet Aung, the latter of whom left the show after the season ended.

== Regional auditions ==
Auditions were held in Taungoo, Hpa-an, Taunggyi, Yangon, and Mandalay from June to July 2019, and around 10,000 attended the auditions.

Episode Air Date	Audition City	Date	Audition Venues	Golden Tickets
September 6, 2019	Mandalay	June 24, 2019	Swan Hotel	N/A
September 13, 2019	Taunggyi	June 16, 2019	City Hall	N/A
September 20, 2019	Taungoo	July 2, 2019	Royal Katumadi Hotel	N/A
September 20, 2019	Hpa-an	July 10, 2018	Zwe Kapin State Hall	N/A
September 27, October 4, 2019	Yangon	July 18–19, 2019	Shwe Htut Tin	N/A
Total Tickets to Golden Week				N/A

=== Structure of auditions ===
There are usually two stages in the audition process. The first round is casting round and they sing in front the executive producers and more are eliminated. In the second round those who survive the first stage sing in front of the judges and this is the audition shown on television. Those who gain at least two "yes" votes from the three judges then receive a golden ticket to Golden Week.

== Golden Week ==
It featured three rounds: Round 1, Group Round, and Solo Round. In the first round, each contestant sang individually, and after they sang, they gathered in a line. Those who impressed the judges advanced to the next round where the contestants performed in groups of four or five, singing a song together. The remaining auditionees who passed the group rounds performed their final solos to advance in the Green Mile.

== Top 11 Finalists and stages ==
Yaw Kee, Benjamin Sum, Naw Say Say Htoo, Tan Khun Kyaw, Chuu Sitt Han, Htet Inzali, Hnin Ei Ei Win, Esther Dawt Chin Sung, Nay Lin Kyaw, Mooler, Aye Mya Phyu.

Color key:

Contestant was saved by public's vote
Contestant was in the bottom three, but was saved by public's vote
Contestant got the elimination result, but was saved by Judges
Contestant was eliminated

=== Week 1: Top 11– ===
Order	Contestant	Song (Burmese name)	Result
1	Yaw Kee	"Ta Ko Yay Lwan Sut Mu" (တစ်ကိုယ်ရေလွမ်းဆွတ်မှု)	Safe
2	Benjamin Sum	"May May Nay Kaung Lar" (မေမေနေကောင်းလား)	Safe
3	Naw Say Say Htoo	"Lu Nyar Gyi" (လူညာကြီး)	Safe
4	Tan Khun Kyaw	"Lann Kwe" (လမ်းခွဲ)	Safe
5	Chuu Sitt Han	"Cherry Street" (ချယ်ရီလမ်း)	Eliminated
6	Htet Inzali	"Tha Khin" (သခင်)	Safe
7	Hnin Ei Ei Win	"Pa Hta Ma Chay Lann" (ပထမခြေလှမ်း)	Bottom 3
8	Esther Dawt Chin Sung	"Ko A Twat Eain Mat Min Mat Lar" (ကိုယ့်အတွက်အိပ်မက်မင်းမက်လား)	Safe
9	Nay Lin Kyaw	"A Thel Na Lone Ma Shi Tae Lu" (အသည်းနှလုံးမရှိတဲ့လူ)	Safe
10	Mooler	"A Naing Nae Paine" (အနိုင်နဲ့ပိုင်း)	Bottom 3
11	Aye Mya Phyu	"Lwan Kwint Lay" (လွမ်းခွင့်လေး)	Safe

=== Week 2: Top 10 – Rock Music ===
There was no elimination because Naw Say Say Htoo was saved by judges.

Order	Contestant	Song (Burmese name)	Result
1	Aye Mya Phyu	"Myin Thaw Ngo Thaw Myet Lone Myar" (မြင်သောငိုသောမျက်လုံးများ)	Safe
2	Nay Lin Kyaw	"Lann Sat Shaut Mal" (လမ်းဆက်လျောက်မယ်)	Safe
3	Naw Say Say Htoo	"Sue Lay" (ဆူးလေး)	Saved by judges
4	Yaw Kee	"Wan Nae Tat Tae Chit Thu" (ဝမ်းနည်းတတ်တဲ့ချစ်သူ)	Bottom 3
5	Tan Khun Kyaw	"Nga Kyaung" (ငါ့ကြောင့်)	Safe
6	Hnin Ei Ei Win	"Gan Dar Yi" (ဂန္ဓာရီ)	Safe
7	Htet Inzali	"Ya Par Tal" (ရပါတယ်)	Bottom 3
8	Esther Dawt Chin Sung	"Yin Ko Phwint Lite Sann" (ရင်ကိုဖွင့်လိုက်စမ်း)	Safe
9	Benjamin Sum	"Twar Mal Ma Twar Nae" (သွားမယ်မတားနဲ့)	Safe
10	Mooler	"Di Lo Thay Char Tal" (ဒီလိုသေချာတယ်)	Safe

=== Week 3: Top 10 – University songs ===
Double elimination because Naw Say Say Htoo was saved by judges in previous week.

Order	Contestant	Song (Burmese name)	Result
1	Nay Lin Kyaw	"Kant Kaw Wai Da Nar" (ကံကော်ဝေဒနာ)	Eliminated
2	Hnin Ei Ei Win	"Ta Chain Tone Ka Tet Ka Tho" (တစ်ချိန်တုန်းကတက္ကသိုလ်)	Eliminated
3	Tan Khun Kyaw	"Kant Kaw Myo Taw" (ကံကော်မြို့တော်)	Safe
4	Yaw Kee	"Nway Kyaung Pate Yat Ma Lo Chin" (နွေကျောင်းပိတ်ရက်မလိုချင်)	Safe
5	Mooler	"A Saung Tha Ye" (အဆောင်သရဲ)	Safe
6	Naw Say Say Htoo	"Toe Tha Ti Ya Nay Mar Par" (တို့သတိရနေမှာပါ)	Bottom 3
7	Esther Dawt Chin Sung	"A Chit Phint Lwan Say" (အချစ်ဖြင့်လွမ်းစေ)	Safe
8	Htet Inzali	"Kyaung Phwint Chain" (ကျောင်းဖွင့်ချိန်)	Safe
9	Benjamin Sum	"Adipati Lan Ka Chay Yar Myar" (အဓိပတိလမ်းကခြေရာများ)	Safe
10	Aye Mya Phyu	"The Moon From University" (တက္ကသိုလ်ကျောင်းကငွေလမင်း)	Safe

=== Week 4: Top 8 – Country Music ===
Order	Contestant	Song (Burmese name)	Result
1	Naw Say Say Htoo	"Nway Oo Wai Da Nar" (နွေဦးဝေဒနာ)	Safe
2	Yaw Kee	"Mee Pya Tite" (မီးပြတိုက်)	Safe
3	Tan Khun Kyaw	"Yangon Thar" (ရန်ကုန်သား)	Eliminated
4	Mooler	"Taung Pan Par Yin Min Si Ko" (တောင်ပံပါရင်မင်းဆီကို)	Safe
5	Htet Inzali	"Cowboy" (ကောင်းဘွိုင်)	Safe
6	Benjamin Sum	"Min Ma Shi Tae Nay Ye Nya" (မင်းမရှိတဲ့နေ့ရယ်ည)	Safe
7	Aye Mya Phyu	"Taut Pa Khe Tae Nay Yet Myar" (တောက်ပခဲ့တဲ့နေ့ရက်များ)	Bottom 3
8	Esther Dawt Chin Sung	"Brake Ma Par Tae Car" (ဘရိတ်မပါတဲ့ကား)	Bottom 3

=== Week 5: Top 7 – Soe Lwin Lwin's songs ===
Order	Contestant	Song (Burmese name)	Result
1	Aye Mya Phyu	"Chit Thu Sate Kuu" (ချစ်သူစိတ်ကူး)	Bottom 3
2	Benjamin Sum	"Sate Phyay Tha Chin" (စိတ်ဖြေသီချင်း)	Safe
3	Htet Inzali	"Nge Nge Tone Ka Htet Po Chit Tal" (ငယ်ငယ်တုန်းကထက်ပိုချစ်တယ်)	Eliminated
4	Naw Say Say Htoo	"Ta Chat Lout Taw Nge Kyi Thint Par Tal" (တစ်ချက်လောက်တော့ငဲ့ကြည့်သင့်ပါတယ်)	Safe
5	Mooler	"Ko Chit" (ကိုယ်ချစ်)	Bottom 3
6	Esther Dawt Chin Sung	"Soe Sate Toe Tate Lwan Chain" (စိုးစိတ်တိုးတိတ်လွမ်းချိန်)	Safe
7	Yaw Kee	"Yin Saing Sa Yar Swan Arr Ma Shi Tawt Lo" (ရင်ဆိုင်စရာစွမ်းအားမရှိတော့လို့)	Safe

=== Week 6: Top 6 – Winter songs ===
Order	Contestant	Song (Burmese name)	Result
1	Naw Say Say Htoo	"Saung Eain Mat" (ဆောင်းအိပ်မက်)	Eliminated
2	Yaw Kee	"Eain Mat Saung Nya" (အိပ်မက်ဆောင်းည)	Bottom 3
3	Aye Mya Phyu	"Di Saung Ta Nya" (ဒီဆောင်းတစ်ည)	Safe
4	Benjamin Sum	"December Nan Nat Khin" (ဒီဇင်ဘာနံနက်ခင်း)	Safe
5	Esther Dawt Chin Sung	"Sway" (ဆွေး)	Bottom 3
6	Mooler	"A Lwan Nya Hay Man" (အလွမ်းညဟေမာန်)	Safe

=== Week 7: Top 5 – Hits songs ===
Order	Contestant	Song (Burmese name)	Result
1	Mooler	"Ta Yauk Tae Lar" (တစ်ယောက်တည်းလား)	Safe
2	Aye Mya Phyu	"A Sin Pyay Par Tal" (အဆင်ပြေပါတယ်)	Safe
3	Esther Dawt Chin Sung	"A Thel Kwe A Htate A Mat" (အသည်းကွဲအထိမ်းအမှတ်)	Bottom 3
4	Yaw Kee	"Ma Shi Tawt Buu" (မရှိတော့ဘူး)	Eliminated
5	Benjamin Sum	"Say" (ဆေး)	Bottom 3

=== Week 8: Top 4 + Wild Card winner – theme songs and strong music ===
Double elimination because Tan Khun Kyaw was returned by Wild Card.

Contestant	Order	First Song (Burmese name)	Order	Second Song (Burmese name)	Result
Tan Khun Kyaw	1	"Ta Pyi Thu Ma Shwe Htar" (တပြည်သူမရွှေထား)	6	"Gabar Myay Nyein Chan Par Say" (ကမ္ဘာမြေငြိမ်းချမ်းပါစေ)	Eliminated
Benjamin Sum	2	"A Chit The Lay Pyay" (အချစ်သည်လေပြေ)	7	"Gabar Myay A Twat Tha Chin" (ကမ္ဘာမြေအတွက်သီချင်း)	Safe
Aye Mya Phyu	3	"Myet Won Le Pyar Pyar" (မျက်ဝန်းလဲ့ပြာပြာ)	8	"Kaung Kin May May" (ကောင်းကင်မေမေ)	Safe
Mooler	4	"Ma Pyo Di Moe" (မပြိုသည့်မိုး)	9	"Than Ma Ni Late Pyar" (သံမဏိလိပ်ပြာ)	Eliminated
Esther Dawt Chin Sung	5	"Myint Mo Htet Myint Thaw" (မြင်းမိုရ်ထက်မြင့်သော)	10	"Nay Thit" (နေ့သစ်)	Safe

=== Week 9: Finale ===
The Top three performed judges chose song, contestants chose themselves song and their winner’s song

Contestant	Order	First Song (Burmese name)	Order	Second Song (Burmese name)	Order	Third Song (Burmese name)	Result
Aye Mya Phyu	1	"Lar Mae Nit Mar Yee Sar Htar Mal" (လာမယ့်နှစ်မှာရည်းစားထားမယ်)	4	"Pin Taing San A Twat A Chit Ye A Lin Yaung" (ပင်တိုင်စံအတွက်အချစ်ရဲ့အလင်းရောင်)	8	"A Phyu Yaung" (အဖြူရောင်)	Runner-up
Esther Dawt Chin Sung	2	"Sin Sar Mar Pot" (စဉ်းစားမှာပေါ့)	6	"Thit Sar Ma Pyat Kyay" (သစ္စာမပျက်ကြေး)	9	"A Phyu Yaung" (အဖြူရောင်)	Winner
Benjamin Sum	3	"Ma Ma Chit Lo Ma Phit" (မမချစ်လို့မဖြစ်)	5	"Myet Na Phone" (မျက်နှာဖုံး)	7	"A Phyu Yaung" (အဖြူရောင်)	Runner-up

== Elimination Chart ==
Order	Contestant	Top 11	Top 10		Top 8	Top 7	Top 6	Top 5	Top 4+1		Finale
1	Esther Dawt Chin Sung	Highest Votes	Safe	Safe	Bottom 3	Safe	Bottom 3	Bottom 3	Safe		Winner
2	Aye Mya Phyu	Safe	Safe	Safe	Bottom 3	Bottom 3	Safe	Safe	Safe		Runner-up
3	Benjamin Sum	Safe	Safe	Safe	Safe	Safe	Safe	Bottom 3	Safe		Runner-up
4	Moo Ler	Bottom 3	Safe	Safe	Safe	Bottom 3	Safe	Safe	Eliminated		
5	Tan Khun Kyaw	Safe	Safe	Safe	Eliminated				Wild Card	Eliminated	
6	Yaw Kee	Safe	Bottom 3	Safe	Safe	Safe	Bottom 3	Eliminated			
7	Naw Say Say Htoo	Safe	Saved by Judges	Bottom 3	Safe	Safe	Eliminated				
8	Htet Inzali	Safe	Bottom 3	Safe	Safe	Eliminated					
9	Nay Lin Kyaw	Safe	Safe	Eliminated							
10	Hnin Ei Ei Win	Bottom 3	Safe	Eliminated							
11	Chuu Sitt Han	Eliminated									

== Wild Card Winner ==
Tan Khun Kyaw was the Channel 9 wild card winner after beating Yaw Kee. The following day alongside Moo Ler, he failed to progress to the finals.
