= Esther Dawt Chin Sung =

Burmese singer (born 1998)

Esther Dawt Chin Sung အက်စတာဒေါ့သ်ချင်းဆုန်
- Born: 20 February 1998 (age 28); Hakha, Chin State, Myanmar
- Origin: Myanmar
- Genres: Pop music, Burmese pop
- Occupation: Singer-songwriter
- Instrument: Vocals
- Years active: 2018–present

Esther Dawt Chin Sung (Burmese: အက်စတာဒေါ့သ်ချင်းဆုန်; born 20 February 1998) is a Burmese singer-songwriter of Chin ethnicity. She achieved national recognition when she won the fourth season of Myanmar Idol. Esther became the first female to win the Myanmar Idol. She also won the Chin Idol in 2017 and was the first winner of the National Performing Arts Competition.

== Early life and education ==
Esther Dawt Chin Sung was born and raised in Hakha, the capital city of Chin State, Myanmar. She has one younger brother and two younger sisters. She graduated from Yangon University of Economics with a Bachelor of Economics in early 2020.

== Career ==
=== 2008: National singing competition ===
Esther started singing and performed publicly at a very young age in church, school and concerts. At the age of 10, she auditioned for the 16th edition of the National Performing Arts Competition, commonly abbreviated Sokayeti (ဆိုကရေးတီး) and won the competition. The song that she sang was "Metta".

=== 2017–2018: Chin Idol competition ===
In 2017, she competed in the second season of the Chin Idol held in Hakha, and became the winner. After winning the Chin Idol, she was invited to perform in Australia, America, Singapore, Malaysia and Bangladesh by fellow Chin people usually with various famous Chin-Burmese singers such as Sung Tin Par, David Lai and Jenny Sui. She released her songs in Lai (Hakha dialect) in 2018 and also appeared as a solo artist on various popular Lai video albums including Christian music.

=== 2019: Myanmar Idol competition ===
In 2019, she competed in the fourth season of Myanmar Idol. She passed Judges Audition, Golden week Theater round 1, Group Song Week in Treater round 2 of Golden Week, Solo Round, Green Mile and she was chosen top 11 finalist. Finally she reached to Grand Final and competed with Aye Mya Phyu, Benjamin Sum. After a public vote, she was declared the winner, receiving 70,000,000 kyats (equivalent to US$50,000.00) and a two bed-room condominium at the Star City in Yangon. Her winner's song "A Phyu Yaung" achieved international and national-wide chart success. During her homecoming to Hakha where a huge crowd of thousands fans gathered. She was designated as a state honorary person and awarded the honorary certificate by Chief Minister Salai Lian Luai and Chin State Government.

=== 2020–present: Performed in oversea concerts and activities ===
Esther continues her career as a professional singer and performs in different parts of Myanmar and world-wide. After winning the Myanmar Idol, she made a tour to Singapore. She also travelled to Australia on 9 March 2020 with a first runner up, Benjamin Sum to support the Fund-Raising Activities of Chin for Australian bushfire victims.

== Discography ==
=== Single ===
- Unseen (6.8.2020)
- Christmas Shi Yin (18.12.2020)

== Award ==
- Joox Top 10 Popular Song Award for 2020

== Philanthropy ==
Esther has supported various charitable organisations and causes in her career. She has contributed to organisations aimed at improving the lives and welfare of children in particular. She performed at the Bush Fire Fund Raising concert for the victim of fire amongst various other performers throughout the world and Myanmar.
