= Pan Ei Phyu =

Burmese female singer

Pan Ei Phyu ပန်းအိဖြူ
- Born: Burma
- Genres: Mahāgīta; Burmese country
- Occupation: Singer
- Instrument: Voice
- Years active: 1996–present
- Spouse: Nay Zaw Htun (m. 2019)

Pan Ei Phyu (Burmese: ပန်းအိဖြူ) is a Burmese classical and country singer. A prolific singer, Pan Ei Phyu has released dozens of bestselling albums throughout her career. She debuted in 1996.

== Discography ==
- Mom, Above Mount Meru (မြင်းမိုရ်ထက်က လမင်းမေမေ) (2020)

== Personal life ==
She married Nay Zaw Htun, an army captain, in 2019 and has one son (born 2020).
