= May Thet Htar Swe =

Burmese female singer

May Thet Htar Swe မေသက်ထားဆွေ
- Born: 10 January 2003 (age 23); Burma
- Genres: Mahāgīta; Burmese country; dhamma
- Occupation: Singer
- Instrument: Vocals
- Years active: 2012–present
- Website: May Thet Htar Swe on Facebook

May Thet Htar Swe (Burmese: မေသက်ထားဆွေ; born 10 January 2003) is a traditional Burmese classical, country, and dhamma singer. She began her career as a child, and is known both for her mastery of songs from the Burmese classical tradition and her musical versatility, which spans several genres.

== Career ==
In 2012, at the age of 9, she participated in Myawaddy TV's children singing competition, Starlets' Sky, becoming well known for her finale performances of "A Letter Written to Japan" (ဂျပန်ပြည်ကိုရေးတဲ့စာ), a pop ballad, and "Candi Kinnari" (စန္ဒကိန္နရီ), a classical Burmese song.

In 2019, she garnered two distinctions (in Burmese and biology) during the University Entrance Examination. In 2020, she received the Shwe FM Award for most frequently requested traditional Burmese vocalist, for her hit song "Near" (အနားနားမှာ). In May 2021, she temporarily ordained as a thilashin, under the Dharma name Somātherī.

== Discography ==
- Bimbo (ဘင်ဘို) (2016)

== Awards ==
- 2015 - Yangon City FM Award for Bestselling Traditional Burmese Female Vocalist
