= Poe Ei San =

Burmese female singer

Poe Ei San ပိုးအိစံ
- Born: Burma
- Genres: Burmese country
- Occupation: Singer
- Instrument: Vocals
- Years active: 2006–present

Poe Ei San (Burmese: ပိုးအိစံ) is a traditional Burmese country singer. A prolific singer, she has released dozens of albums throughout her career. As of 2020, she has received five Yangon City FM Awards. In 2012, she launched a weekly magazine, Akelay (အကဲလေး). In 2016, she released 7 albums simultaneously to mark her 20th anniversary in the music industry.

== Discography ==
- One Time Birthplace (တစ်ခါကမွေးဌာနီ) (1995)
- Song of the Successful (အောင်နိုင်သူ တေးများ) (2000)
- Inle Lake of the Future (နောင်အင်းလေး) (2003)

== Awards ==
- 2004 - Yangon City FM Award for Bestselling Traditional Burmese Female Vocalist
- 2006 - Yangon City FM Award for Bestselling Traditional Burmese Female Vocalist
- 2010 - Yangon City FM Award for Bestselling Traditional Burmese Female Vocalist
- 2013 - Yangon City FM Award for Bestselling Traditional Burmese Female Vocalist
- 2014 - Yangon City FM Award for Bestselling Traditional Burmese Female Vocalist

== Personal life ==
Her father, 'Shwe La' Than Htun Lay, is a singer.
