= Irene Zin Mar Myint =

Burmese pop singer (born 1990)

Irene Zin Mar Myint အိုင်းရင်းဇင်မာမြင့်
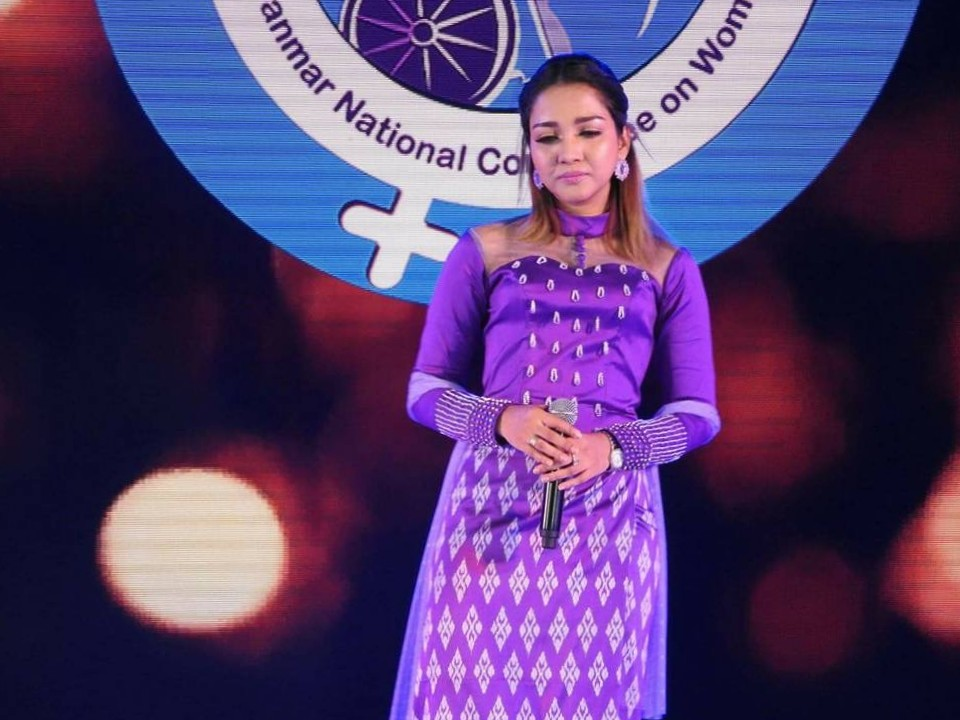
- Irene at the concert of Myanmar National Committee on Women

Background information
- Born: Zin Mar Myint; 29 August 1990 (age 35); Yangon, Myanmar
- Genres: Pop, R&B
- Occupation: Singer
- Instrument: Vocals
- Years active: 2008–present
- Website: facebook.com/IreneZinMarMyintOfficial

Irene Zin Mar Myint (Burmese: အိုင်းရင်းဇင်မာမြင့်, also spelt Irene Zin Ma Myint; born Zin Mar Myint; 29 August 1990) is a Burmese pop singer and best known for her Pop music. In January 2025, she is officially facing a boycott from her fans for complying with the dictatorship without participating in the CDM under the military coup council.

She gained recognition from competed in Melody World, a televised singing competition.

== Early life and education ==
Irene was born on 29 August 1990 in Yangon, Myanmar to Burmese Jewish parents. Her mother and father were born in Yangon to parents of Burmese-Jewish descent. She is the youngest daughter of four siblings, having three elder brothers, and one of her brothers, Leo Bo Bo is also a singer. She is a practicing Baptist. She attended the high school at BEHS 2 Sanchaung and graduated Eco from University of East Yangon in 2011.

== Career ==
Irene started out on her music career in participated as a contestant in Melody World, a televised singing competition and gained recognition after competed, even she was not placed in the top 5. After she has competed in Melody World, she engaged in shooting commercial advertisements, stage performances, and many concerts at various locations throughout Myanmar.

Irene started endeavoring to be able to produce and distribute a solo album. She launched her debut solo album Yein Lite in 2012, which spawned more huge hits. Many music industry records have followed since then. Her second album, Chit Loh, was released on 28 May 2017. The latter album was inspired by her experiences following the breakup of an eight-year relationship. She gained the Most Requested Song 2013 Award with Na Lone Thar A Yinn A Naee song, awarded by Shwe FM at 4th Anniversary Music Awards Ceremony in 2013.

Irene released her third album MAR at her 28th birthday on 29 August 2018.

== Discography ==
=== Solo albums ===
- Yein Lite (ယိမ်းလိုက်) (2012)
- Chit Loh (ချစ်လို့) (2017)
- MAR (မာ) (2018)

=== Collaborative albums ===
- Melody World Album (2008)
- A Yin Tine Htet (အရင်းတိုင်းထက်) (2009)
- A Chit Htet Ma Ka (အချစ်ထက်မက) (2011)
- Nan Yoe Paing Shin (နံရိုးပိုင်ရှင်) (2014)
- ZPNI (2016)

== Accolades ==
| Award | Year (Note: Indicates the year of ceremony. Each year is linked to the article about the awards held that year, wherever possible.) | Recipient(s) and nominee(s) | Category | Result | Ref. |
|---|---|---|---|---|---|
| City FM awards | 2019 | Irene Zin Mar Myint | Best Selling Studio Music Album Female Vocalist of the Year | Won | |
| City FM awards | 2020 | Irene Zin Mar Myint | Most Popular Female Vocalist of the Year | Nominated | |
| City FM awards | 2020 | Irene Zin Mar Myint | Best Selling Stereo Music Album Female Vocalist of the Year | Nominated | |
| Shwe FM awards | 2013 | Irene Zin Mar Myint | Most Requested Single of the year(Female) | Won | |
| Shwe FM awards | 2019 | Irene Zin Mar Myint | Most Requested Single of the year(Female) | Won | |

== See also ==
- Music of Myanmar
