= Imago Film Festival =

The Imago Film Festival is a film festival that takes place annually in the state of Illinois, United States. It is usually in April on the Judson University campus. The mission statement indicates: "The Imago Film Festival showcases independent film that deals with faith issues, emphasizing image and story. The festival films capture the full spectrum of human emotion, experience, and spirituality."

== History ==
The Imago Film Festival was developed in 2005 to showcase films made by students at Judson University. Impressed by the reception of the one-night event, professors Dr. Terrence Wandtke and Darren Wilson expanded the festival to a five-day event in 2006 and invited submissions from outside the school.

The festival explores the connections between faith and film. In addition to screening independent short films from around the world, the festival features critics and filmmakers discussing the intersections of art, culture, and religion. The festival is supported by individual donors, corporate sponsors, and the Judson Student Organization.

Speakers have included: Jim Wall, senior corresponding editor of The Christian Century (2006); Phil Vischer, creator of Veggie Tales and Robert K. Johnston, author of Reel Spirituality (2007); Stephen Vidano, director of Star of Bethlehem and David Dark, author of The Sacredness of Questioning Everything (2008); David McFadzean, creator of Home Improvement and William Romanowski, author of Eyes Wide Open (2009); Darren Wilson, director of Furious Love and Gaye Williams Ortiz, author of Theology and Film (2010); David Nixon, producer/director of To Write Love on Her Arms and Jeffrey Overstreet, author of Through a Screen Darkly (2011); Brooks Douglass, writer of Heaven's Rain and Steve Taylor, producer/director of Blue Like Jazz (2012); Ralph Winter, producer of Star Trek and X-Men films and Dean Batali, writer for That '70s Show (2013); Ron Dean, actor in The Fugitive and The Dark Knight and Marshall Allman, actor in True Blood and Blue Like Jazz (2014); Doug Jones, actor in Pan's Labyrinth, Hellboy, and Falling Skies and Will Bakke, director of Believe Me (2015); Joshua Weigel, director of "The Butterfly Circus" and Matthew Luhn, story artist for Toy Story, Finding Nemo, and Monsters, Inc. (2016); Rich Peluso, senior vice president of Affirm Films and Eric Groth, producer of Full of Grace (2017).

The Imago Lifetime Achievement Award was inaugurated in the festival's tenth year to recognize filmmakers whose work contributes to the discussion of issues of faith and ethics. The award recipients have included: Martin Sheen (2014), Denzel Washington (2015), Ralph Winter (2016), and David McFadzean (2017).

== Awards ==
2005

- Best in Show: “The Money Tree”—Ryan Lawrence

2006

- Best of Show: “Anniversary”—Greg Hargis
- 1-10 Minutes: “Lift”—Terri Sarris
- 11-20 Minutes: “The Kinkade Code”—Matt Bilen
- Audience Choice: “Pillowfight”—Scott Rice

2007

- Best of Show: “Jaded”—Anders Lindwall
- 1-10 Minutes: “Redemption”—Sharise Holt
- 11-20 Minutes: “Crown of the Forest”—Brain Walton
- Audience Choice: “Mind’s Eye”—Matt Bilen

2008

- Best in Show: “Holding”—Thomas Bradson
- 1-15 Minutes: “Dependence”—Tamara Shaya
- 16-30 Minutes: “The Noble Lie”—Mitch Lusas
- Audience Choice: “Abigail”—Lauran Holton

2009

- Best in Show: “Gaining Ground”—Marc Brummund
- 1-15 Minutes: “Arc of a Bird”—Hugh Sculze
- 16-30 Minutes: “The Prodigal Trilogy”—Tad Munnings
- Audience Choice: “Somebody’s Baby”—Garrett Marks

2010

- Best in Show: “Jitensha”—Paul Nethercott
- 1-15 Minutes: “Prayers for Peace”—Justin Grella
- 16-30 Minutes: “A Mysterious Way”—Phil Warner
- Audience Choice: “More than Walking”—Jonathan Sigworth

2011

- Best in Show: "Kavi"—Gregg Halvey
- 1-15 Minutes: "Afghan"—Pardis Parker
- 16-30 Minutes: "Rita"—Antonio Piazza
- Audience Choice: "LastRain"—Tony Lopez

2012

- Best in Show: "When Cotton Blossoms"—Scott Magie
- 1-15 Minutes: "The Cortege"—Marina Sereseky
- 16-30 Minutes: "Mato Oput"—Tim Guthrie
- Audience Choice: "The Dance"—Pardis Parker

2013

- Best in Show: "Wednesday's Child"—Rocco Cataldo
- 1-15 Minutes: "The Discarded"—David Delicado Adsuar
- 16-30 Minutes: "Stalled"—Shannon Kohli
- Audience Choice: "Smile"—Matteo Pianezzi and "The Apple of My Eye"—Josecho de Linares

2014

- Best in Show: "Not Anymore: A Story of Revolution"-Matthew VanDyke
- Shorter time frame: "Ngutu"-Felipe del Olmo, Daniel Valledor
- Longer time frame: "The Uneducated"-Craig Rutherford
- Audience Choice: "The Advocate"-Sean Taylor, Kyla Martin

2015

- Best in Show: "Lila"-Carlos Lascano
- 1st Runner Up: "Somewhere Between Freedom and Protection, Kansas"-Patrick Clement
- 2nd Runner Up: "The Unclean"-Bahram Ark
- Audience Choice: "Love at First Sight"-Mark Playne

2016

- Best in Show: "We Can't Live Without Cosmos"-Konstantin Bronzit
- 1st Runner Up: "Persimmon"-Dean Yamada
- 2nd Runner Up: "Speed Dating"-Meghann Artes
- Audience Choice: "Not the End"-Cesar Esteban Alenda & Jose Esteban Alenda

2017

- Best in Show: "My Life I Don't Want"-Nyan Kyal Say
- 1st Runner Up: "Red Light"-Toma Waszarow
- 2nd Runner Up: "Tiny's New Home"-Justin Hayward
- Audience Choice tie: "The Chop"-Lewis Rose
- Audience Choice tie: "Darrel"-Marc Briones Piulachs

== See also ==
- List of film festivals
