= Myanmar Convention Centre =

- Interactive map of the Myanmar Convention Centre area

General information
- Type: Convention centre
- Location: Min Dhama Road, Yangon
- Coordinates: 16°52′30″N 96°07′45″E
- Owner: Yangon City Development Committee

The Myanmar Convention Centre (MCC) is a convention centre located in Yangon, the former capital city of Myanmar. Situated on Min Dhama Road in Mayangon Township, the venue hosts numerous business and entertainment events, while the Exhibition Centre provides large space for outdoor activities, events and trade fairs. The Yangon City FM Awards are held annually at MCC.
