= Soe Sandar Tun =

Burmese female singer

Soe Sandar Htun စိုးစန္ဒာထွန်း
- Born: Burma
- Genres: Mahāgīta; Burmese country; dhamma
- Occupation: Singer
- Instrument: Voice

Soe Sandar Htun (Burmese: စိုးစန္ဒာထွန်း, also spelt Soe Sandar Tun) is a Burmese classical, country, and Dhamma singer. A prolific singer, Soe Sandar Htun has released dozens of bestselling albums throughout her career. She has won several bestselling music awards, including Yangon City FM Awards for traditional Burmese music in 2020. She is known for her 'sweet' voice, and her signature long hair.

== Discography ==
- Love Lawyer (အချစ်ရှေ့နေ) (2013)
- Auspicious Almsgiving (အလှူတော်မင်္ဂလာ) (2014)
- Mya Nadi (မြနဒီ) (2014)
- Queen of the Heart (နှလုံးသားရဲ့ ဧကရီ) (2019
- Remembering Waso (သတိရမိတယ် ဝါဆို) (2023)

== Awards ==
- 2001 – Yangon City FM Award for Audience Choice and Bestselling Traditional Burmese Female Vocalist
- 2007 – Yangon City FM Award for Bestselling Traditional Burmese Female Vocalist
- 2008 – Yangon City FM Award for Bestselling Traditional Burmese Female Vocalist
- 2019 – Yangon City FM Award for Bestselling Traditional Burmese Female Vocalist
