= Farkawn =

- Village
- Location in Mizoram, India Farkawn (India)
- Coordinates: 23.0786839°N 93.294836°E
- Country: India
- State: Mizoram
- District: Champhai
- Block: Khawbung
- Elevation: 1,279 m (4,196 ft)

Population (2011)
  - Total: 2,700
- Time zone: UTC+5:30 (IST)
- 2011 census code: 271,371

Farkawn is a village in the Champhai district of Mizoram, India. It is located in the Khawbung R.D. Block and is near to the capital of Chinland, which is Camp Victoria.

== Demographics ==
According to the 2011 census of India, Farkawn has 553 households. The effective literacy rate (i.e. the literacy rate of population excluding children aged 6 and below) is 97.64%.

Demographics (2011 Census)
	Total	Male	Female
Population	2700	1348	1352
Children aged below 6 years	374	199	175
Scheduled caste	0	0	0
Scheduled tribe	2641	1307	1334
Literates	2271	1130	1141
Workers (all)	1567	785	782
Main workers (total)	1488	749	739
Main workers: Cultivators	1269	585	684
Main workers: Agricultural labourers	3	3	0
Main workers: Household industry workers	4	2	2
Main workers: Other	212	159	53
Marginal workers (total)	79	36	43
Marginal workers: Cultivators	66	32	34
Marginal workers: Agricultural labourers	0	0	0
Marginal workers: Household industry workers	0	0	0
Marginal workers: Others	13	4	9
Non-workers	1133	563	570

== Notable people ==
- Benjamin Sum
