= Aung La =

Burmese rock artist, musician and singer-songwriter

Aung La အောင်လ
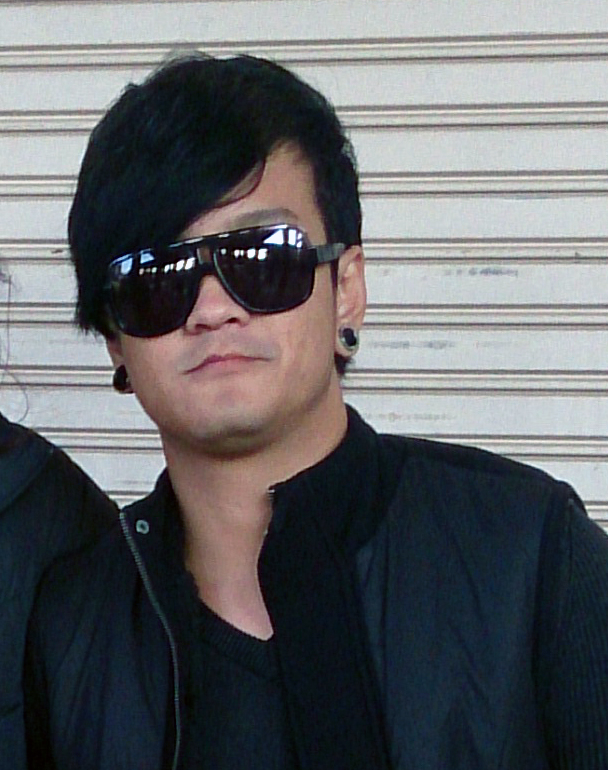
- Aung La during a photoshoot in December 2013

Background information
- Also known as: Aung La Reason
- Born: January 1, 1990 (age 36); Yangon, Myanmar (Burma)
- Genres: Pop music, rock music, and indie music
- Occupations: Singer, song-writer, artist, and musician
- Instruments: Vocals, guitar
- Years active: 2002–present
- Labels: JnK Records, Golden Robot Records
- Member of: Reason (Burmese rock band)
- Formerly of: NC-13
- Spouse: Moe Nge
- Partner: Wyne Su Khine Thein (2017–2024)

Aung La (Burmese: အောင်လ; pronounced [àʊɴ lɑ]; born 1990) is a Burmese musician, known as the lead vocalist and songwriter of the Burmese rock band Reason.

== Early life ==
Aung La was born on 1 January 1990, and grew up in Yangon, Myanmar. Growing up in a family with strong ties to the music industry, his mother was a popular pop singer in the 1970s, while his father worked as a recording engineer. This early exposure to music deeply influenced his interest in the art form.

Aung La began learning to play the guitar under his father's guidance and soon began developing his own musical style. After completing his 10th grade education, he chose to pursue music professionally. During his early years, he performed with various local musicians in underground venues, gaining experience and honing his skills.

== Music career ==
In 2008, Aung La co-founded the Burmese rock band Reason. Aung La took on the roles of lead vocalist and primary songwriter for the band.

Over the years, Reason became known for their unique approach to rock music in Myanmar. Reason band has been recognized for incorporating more complex and introspective themes into Burmese rock, often dealing with personal struggles, love, and social issues.

Aung La's contributions to the Reason band discography have resulted in the release of several notable songs and albums. Some well-known tracks by the band include:

- Taung Pan Tel (Begging You)
- My Home Paradise
- Oo Phyit Khar
- PK
- December Trauma
- Time Bomb

The band's style blends elements of alternative rock, hard rock, and ballads, demonstrating a diverse musical approach. Aung La's lyrics often explore themes of self-reflection, love, loss, and social issues. Alongside individual songs, the band has released full-length albums that continue to resonate with both longtime fans and new listeners.

== Discography ==
1. Mar Ti Kar (2010)
2. Pin Lal Htay Ka Myit Myar (2016)
3. A Tone Taw Khan (2018)

=== Singles and EPs ===
1. A Lwan Tal (2016)
2. Asin Pyay Mhar Par (2016)
3. Mhar Khae Lar (2016)
4. Pin Lel Htel Ka River (2023)
5. Oo Pyit Khar (2024)
6. December Trauma (2024)
7. Phat Kyann (2024)
8. SEPTEMBER Yae Moe (2024)
9. Yangon Myoe Yae Awine Gyi Htay (2024)
10. PK (2025)
11. Phat Kya (2025)

=== Notable tracks ===
1. Taung Pan Tel (Begging You)
2. My Home Paradise
3. Oo Pyit Khar
4. PK
5. December Trauma
6. Time Bomb

== Awards ==
- Most Popular Male Vocalist – Yangon City FM Awards (2011)
- Best Song of the Year – "Taung Pan Tel" (2012)

== Personal life ==
Aung La is married to Moe Nge, whom he met in 2009. Their relationship has influenced some of his songs.

In addition to his music career, Aung La has taken on a caregiving role for his father, who suffered a stroke in 2005. Despite his busy professional life, he remains involved in his father's care.

He was previously in a relationship with a Burmese singer Wyne Su Khine Thein. The couple, who were publicly known to be together as early as 2017, experienced significant strain—exacerbated during the COVID-19 period. In an interview published on 18 January 2024, Wyne Su Khine Thein explained that the breakup was largely due to the financial pressures she faced from having to bear most household expenses on her own, as well as feeling emotionally neglected and mistreated by Aung La. These challenges ultimately led her to end the relationship.
