= Khine Htoo =

Khine Htoo ခိုင်ထူး
- Born: 28 January 1956; Burma
- Died: 9 August 2017 (aged 61) Yangon, Myanmar
- Genres: Burmese Pop
- Occupation: Singer
- Instrument: Guitar

Khine Htoo (Burmese: ခိုင်ထူး; also spelt Khaing Htoo, 28 January 1956 – 9 August 2017) was a prominent Burmese singer, known for numerous hit songs, including "Sagaing Road" (စစ်ကိုင်းလမ်း), "Khitta" (ခတ္တာ), "The Last Dream" (နောက်ဆုံးအိပ်မက်), and "Inzali" (အဉ္ဇလီ).

== Early life and education ==
Khine Htoo was born on 28 January 1956, in Rangoon, Burma, to Tha Hto, a professor at the Yangon University of Economics, and his wife, Tin Myint Myint. He was the second eldest of three children.

Khine Htoo was first married to May Kyaw Khaing, a physician. The two separated following the 8888 Uprising, when his wife, involved in political activities, fled to the Thai-Burmese border. Following that, he wed Mi Gai(T Hawng Naw), an ethnic Kachin. The two have a son, Gum San Laphai (Seng Lin Htoo).His third marriage was with Saw Nwe Nwe Htun.At that time of his death, left by his only son, Gum San Lahpai(Seng Lin Htoo), who now lives in Sweden.

== Death ==
On 31 July 2017, Khine Htoo was admitted to Yangon General Hospital for hematemesis, and also showed symptoms of jaundice. His condition did not improve, so he was flown to Samitivej Hospital in Bangkok for further treatment. There, he was diagnosed with an advanced form of pancreatic cancer. Khine Htoo was flown back to Yangon on 8 August, and died of pancreatic cancer at the Parami Hospital in Yangon, Myanmar on 9 August 2017, around 3:24 pm.

== Discography ==
=== Solo albums ===
- တေးမြုံငှက်
- အဉ္စလီ
- သီချင်းတစ်ပုဒ်၊ ပန်းတစ်ဆုပ်
- မိုးရဲရင်ဆောင်းရဲရမယ်
- ဆို
- မကောင်းလည်းကိုယ်၊ကောင်းလည်းကိုယ်
- ရွှေလည်တိုင်
- အားလုံးကိုကျော်ဖြတ်ရမယ်
- မကျေနပ်ဘူးသိလား
- အစောဆုံးပြန်ခဲ့ နှင်းသက်သက်ဝေ
- ၃၉
- ကမ်းလက်သင့်ရာ
- အမုန်းဆုပန်မယ့်လူသား
- တွဲဖက်ချွေး

== See also ==
- Music of Myanmar
