= My Life I Don't Want =

Burmese short animated film

My Life I Don’t Want
- ကျွန်မလိုချင်တဲ့ ကျွန်မဘဝ
- Directed by: Nyan Kyal Say
- Written by: Nyan Kyal Say
- Screenplay by: Animation
- Story by: Nyan Kyal Say
- Produced by: Nyan Kyal Say
- Music by: Diramore
- Release date: 2016
- Running time: 11 minutes
- Country: Myanmar
- Language: No dialogue

My Life I Don't Want (a.k.a. Kyama Malo Chin Telt Kyama Bawa) is a 2016 Burmese short animated film, made by Nyan Kyal Say. It won 39 awards from international film festivals with over 50 nominations and 140 official selections around the globe.

== Plot ==
A Burmese baby girl is born by a poor family. The parents do not care enough of her due to their busy jobs and also with gambling and drinking. As the baby girl grows, she starts schooling. The poor education system and family upbringing cannot fulfill her dreams but destroyed them. Her elder brother is favored by their parents for his education, because her brother is a boy.

After some domestic violence at her home, she leaves her home and stays together with her grandmother, uncle and aunt at their home. However, she is denied education and only do household chores. One day, she has been raped by her uncle. Then, she runs away and escaped from their home, again. While she is staying on the street, a boy cares for her and she falls in love with the boy. But, one day, the boy leaves her and finds another girlfriend. A man comes to her, caring for her but plans to smuggle her away to another country. She noticed that and run away again.

While she is running away, she remembered her past incidents she faced all along her life. After running through a dark forest, she gets pregnant. She has no idea what to do, but just stands on the edge of the cliff. Underneath the cliff she is standing, there are also many other cliffs, each with a girl standing like her at the edge of their own cliff.

At the moment, somebody come to her to help rescuing her. She smiles with hope.

== Production ==
Nyan Kyal Say took 9 months to create this animated short. There were around 10 members of artists contributed in production stage with the main assists of Nobel Aung and Keeso. They used 2D digital animation. The background music is produced by Diramore. The cast of the main character is Tin Aye Hlaing. The casts of the other characters are the artists who contributed in making animation.

== Awards ==
The film was released in 2016 June at Human Rights Human Dignity International Film Festival in Myanmar, with its debut award, ‘March 13 the Best Animation Award’. Within one and half years after its debut screening, the film has been selected by over 140 film festivals from Africa, Asia, Australia, Europe, North America and South America, with over 50 nominations and won 39 awards including the ‘Best Social Awareness Award’ from Animayo, an Oscar qualifying festival and 2017 Best In Show Award in Imago Film Festival. Imago Film Festival - Wikipedia It also has been selected in other Oscar qualifying film festivals such as Anima Mundi. Animest and FlickFest.
