= Melody World =

- Also known as: သံစဉ်များနဲ့ကမ္ဘာ
- Genre: Reality television
- Judges: Nwet Yin Win, KAT, Myint Moe Aung, One Guest Judge
- Country of origin: Myanmar
- Original language: Burmese

Production
- Production location: Myanmar

Original release
- Network: Myawaddy TV

Melody World (Burmese: သံစဉ်များနဲ့ကမ္ဘာ) is a televised singing competition broadcast in Myanmar by Myawaddy TV. Several prominent Burmese singers, including Chan Chan, Irene Zin Mar Myint, and Ni Ni Khin Zaw, made their musical debuts on Melody World.

The show is hosted by Myint Moe Aung. Judges for the show have included Burmese composers KAT (Kyaw Kyaw Aung) and Maung Thit Min.

Winners

2007 - Htet Nay Kyi 2008 - Ni Ni Khin Zaw 2009 - Shwe Yi Phyo Maung 2010 - Phyo Pyae Sone 2011 - Wutyi Htet 2012 - Phoo Phoo 2013 - Aung Ko Ko 2014 - J Mine My 2015 - Kyal Sin Thin 2016 - Li Ga 2017 - Cho Sandy Chit Su 2018 - Naing Lin Tun
