= Padamyar FM =

FM station in Myanmar

Coordinates: 16°49′03.8″N 96°07′47.0″E

Myanmar
- Frequencies: 88.6 MHz, 88.9 MHz, 89.5 MHz, 90.7 MHz, 91.3 MHz, 92.2 MHz, 92.5 MHz, 93.4 MHz, 93.7 MHz
- Branding: Padamyar FM

Programming
- Format: News and entertainment

Ownership
- Owner: PadamyarFM Media Co., Ltd

History
- First air date: 25 August 2009; 16 years ago

Links
- Website: padamyarfm.com.mm

Padamyar FM (Burmese: ပတ္တမြားအက်ဖ်အမ်) is one of the popular FM station in Myanmar. The station is serving around Myanmar area to provide the audience the best music library, entertainment and edutainment programs for every lifestyle. With over 14 million listeners on air, Padamyar FM covers every genre from 5 AM to 11 PM daily.

Since August 2009, they were in test transmission at Sagaing region with 88.9 MHz. Now they have installed FM transmitters at following cities.

== Services ==
No	CITY	Frequency	First air date
1	Sagaing	88.9 MHz	25 August 2009
2	Myitkyina	88.9 MHz	17 December 2009
3	Monywa	88.6 MHz	7 February 2010
4	Kantbalu	88.6 MHz	29 May 2010
5	Bhamo	88.9 MHz	30 May 2010
6	Nan Mar	88.9 MHz	30 August 2010
7	Pyinmana	89.5 MHz	1 September 2010
8	Katha	88.9 MHz	8 September 2010
9	Yangon	88.2 MHz (Former 91 MHz)	1 November 2010
10	Bago	91.3 MHz	13 December 2010
11	Popa	90.7 MHz	1 February 2011
12	Pyay	91.3 MHz	23 October 2011
13	Mawlamyine	92.5 MHz	4 September 2015
14	Taunggyi	92.2 MHz	29 September 2015
15	Bilin	90.7 MHz	20 February 2016
16	Taungoo	93.4 MHz	7 March 2016
17	Pathein	93.7 MHz	18 July 2016
