= National Performing Arts Competition =

The National Performing Arts Competition (Burmese: မြန်မာတိုင်းရင်းသားတို့၏ ရိုးရာယဉ်ကျေးမှု အဆို၊ အက၊ အရေး၊ အတီးပြိုင်ပွဲ), commonly abbreviated Sokayeti (Burmese: ဆိုကရေးတီး), is an annual performing arts competition held in Myanmar since 1993. The competition is held in October of each year.

== Divisions ==
The Sokayeti is divided into divisions, namely singing, dancing, composing, and instrumental performances, theatrical performances, marionette. and Burmese drama. Dances from ethnic minorities, including the Karen don dance have been included into the competition. Most competitors are from the National University of Arts and Culture, Yangon and Mandalay, the State School of Fine Arts, and other culture-oriented educational institutions.

The divisions are divided into gender, and include:

- Singing
  - Mahāgīta
  - Old and contemporary songs
  - Popular songs
- Dancing
  - Dance
  - Dramatic play - Suvaṇṇa Jātaka (သုဝဏ္ဏဇာတ်တော်ကြီ)
  - Marionette
    - Yokson (person, parrot, nat, mouse)
    - Yokthe (prince, princess, ogre)
  - Kwetseit (ကွက်စိပ်)
    - Sutanu Jātaka (သုတနုဇာတ်)
    - Scene of Rāhula Requesting Inheritance
    - မွေခံထိုက်စေရိုးရာအမွေ
- Composing
  - Amateur Level 1
  - Amateur Level 2
  - Professional
- Instrumental performances
  - Burmese harp
  - Pattala
  - Piano
  - Hsaing waing
  - Hne
  - Violin
  - Hsaingwainggyi
  - Ozi (အိုးစည်)
  - Dobat (ဒိုးပတ်)
  - Mandolin
  - Guitar
  - Donmin (ဒုံမင်း)

== Levels ==
Competitors in each division are divided into 6 levels, according to age and ability:

- Amateur Level 1
- Amateur Level 2
- Professional
- Ages 15 to 20
- Ages 10 to 15
- Ages 5 to 10

== See also ==
- Burmese music
- Burmese dance
- Culture of Myanmar
- Mahagita
