= Wyne Su Khine Thein =

Burmese singer and actress

- ဝိုင်စုခိုင်သိန်း
- Born: December 24, 1986 (age 39); Rangoon, Burma
- Education: Dagon University
- Occupations: Singer, actress
- Years active: 2004–present
- Partner: Oakkar Myint Kyu(2014-2016) Aung La(2021-2024)(E
- Parent(s): Thein Htay (father); May Yee Aung (mother)
- Awards: Best Selling Studio Music Album Female Vocalist of the Year 2009 (City FM); Popular Artist of the Year 2011 (Padamyar FM); Best Couple Song Award 2011 (Shwe FM); Best Vocalist Award 2012 (Shwe FM); Best Female Vocalist Award 2013 (City FM); Best Dress Award 2013 (Shwe FM 4th Anniversary); The Best Selling Studio Music Album Female Vocalist of the Year 2013 (City FM); The Best Selling Studio Music Album Female Vocalist of the Year 2014 (City FM); Female Vocalist of the Year 2014 (City FM); I Love Artist Award of Monsoon 2014 (Myanmar Music Awards); The Best Selling Studio Music Album Female Vocalist of the Year 2015 (City FM); Best Couple Song Award 2016 (Shwe FM); The Best Selling Studio Music Album Production Award 2016 (City FM); Popular Singer Award 2019 (City FM); Most Popular Female Vocalist Award 2020 (City FM); Joox Top 10 Artist of the Year 2019
- Musical career
- Genres: Pop
- Instruments: Vocals; guitar; piano

Wyne Su Khine Thein (Burmese: ဝိုင်းစုခိုင်သိန်း; born 24 December 1986) is a Burmese singer and actress. She is best known for her pleasant voice. Her debut album Mat Lout Sayar was released in 2009 and it was popular among audiences.

== Early life and education ==
Wyne Su was born on 24 December 1986 in Yangon, Myanmar to parents Thein Htay and May Yee Aung. She attended high school at Basic Education High School No. 1 Dagon. She graduated with a degree B.A English from Dagon University.

== Career ==
Wyne began her art work career in 2004. She has acted in over 130 films. Her debut album Mat Lout Sayar was released in 2009 and it was popular among audiences. Her second album Myet Hlae was released in 2011 and it also gained popularity. Then she became one of the most popular female singers in Myanmar. Her third album Ar Bwar was released in 2013. Her fourth album Khar Cha Nay Ya Tal was released in 2015. Her fifth album Gar was released in 2016. Her sixth album Mal Thida was released in 2017. Her seventh album Nwar Kyaung Thu was released in 2019.

== Discography ==
=== Solo Album ===
- Mat Lout Sayar (မက်လောက်စရာ) (2009)
- Myet Hlae (မျက်လှည့်) (2011)
- Ar Bwar (အာဘွား) (2013)
- Gar (ဂါ) (2016)
- Mal Thida (မယ်သီတာ-EP) (2017)
- Nwar Kyaung Thu (နွားကျောင်းသူ) (2019)

=== Duo Album ===
- Khar Cha Nay Ya Tal (ခါချနေရတယ်) (2015)

== Filmography ==
- Kaba Sone Hti (2005)
- Yadana (2006)

== Concerts ==
Year	Name	City
2015	First Solo Concert	Yangon
2015	Solo Concert	Mandalay
2017	Second Solo Concert For her Birthday	Yangon
2018	Second Solo Concert	Mandalay
2019	FG Live Lounge	Yangon
2024	One Lady Show	Mandalay

== Accolades ==
Award	Year (Note: Indicates the year of ceremony. Each year is linked to the article about the awards held that year, wherever possible.)	Recipient(s) and nominee(s)	Category	Result	Ref.
City FM awards	2010	Wine Su Khaing Thein	Best Selling Stereo Music Album Female Vocalist of the Year	Won	
City FM awards	2013	Wine Su Khaing Thein	Most Popular Female Vocalist of the Year	Won	
City FM awards	2013	Wine Su Khaing Thein	Best Selling Stereo Music Album Female Vocalist of the Year	Won	
City FM awards	2014	Wine Su Khaing Thein	Best Selling Stereo Music Album Female Vocalist of the Year	Won	
City FM awards	2015	Wine Su Khaing Thein	Best Selling Stereo Music Album Female Vocalist of the Year	Won	
City FM awards	2016	H&M Production	The Best Selling Stereo Music Album Production of the Year	Won	
City FM awards	2019	Wine Su Khaing Thein	Most Popular Female Vocalist of the Year	Nominated	
City FM awards	2020	Wine Su Khaing Thein	Most Popular Female Vocalist of the Year	Won	
Joox Myanmar Music awards	2020	Herself	Joox Top 10 Artists of the Year	Won	
Myanmar Music awards	2014	Herself	I Love Artist Award of Monsoon	Won	
Padamyar FM Awards	2011	Herself	Artist of the Year	Won	
Shwe FM awards	2011	Wine Su Khaing Thein	Best Couple song award	Won	
Shwe FM awards	2012	Wine Su Khaing Thein	Best Vocalist award	Won	
Shwe FM awards	2013	Wine Su Khaing Thein	Best Dress award	Won	
Shwe FM awards	2016	Wine Su Khaing Thein	Best Best Couple Song award	Won	
Shwe FM awards	2020	Wine Su Khaing Thein	Most Popular Song award	Won	
Myanmar Academy Awards	2009	Kyo Kyar Taung Pan Khat Than	Best Supporting Actress	Nominated	

== Personal life ==
Wyne was married to Oakar Myint Kyu in 2014 and divorced in 2016.
