= National University of Arts and Culture, Mandalay =

Art school in Mandalay, Myanmar

Coordinates: 21°58′0″N 96°11′0″E

- အမျိုးသားယဉ်ကျေးမှုနှင့် အနုပညာတက္ကသိုလ် (မန္တလေး)
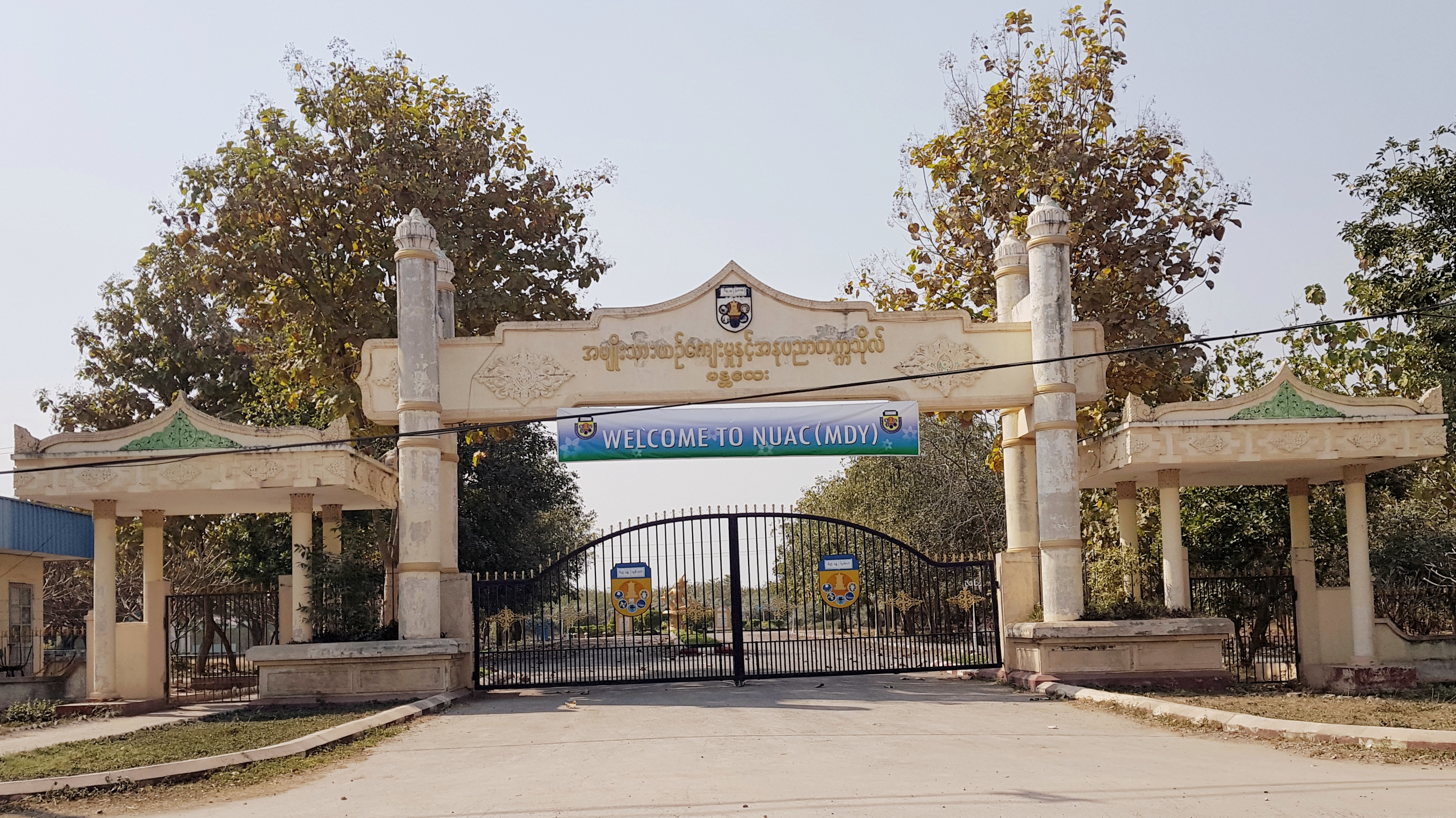
- Motto: စိတ္တံဒန္တံ သုခါဝဟံ cittaṃ dantaṃ sukhāvahaṃ
- Motto in English: Mind when tamed is conducive to happiness
- Type: public
- Established: 5 November 2001; 24 years ago
- Affiliations: Ministry of Religious Affairs and Culture (Myanmar)
- Rector: Aung San Oo
- Pro Rector: Daw Aye Sandar Aung
- Academic staff: 232
- Administrative staff: 149
- Students: 800
- Location: Shwesayan Pagoda Road; Patheingyi, Mandalay, Mandalay Region, Myanmar
- Website: www.nuacmdy.com

The National University of Art and Culture, Mandalay (Burmese: အမျိုးသားယဉ်ကျေးမှုနှင့် အနုပညာတက္ကသိုလ် (မန္တလေး), pronounced [jɪ̀ɰ̃tɕém̥ṵ tɛʔkəθò (máɰ̃dəlé)]), located in Patheingyi, Mandalay, is one of two performing and visual arts universities in Myanmar. The university offers bachelor's degree programs in traditional Burmese performing and visual arts. Qualified students may continue post-graduate studies at the University of Culture, Yangon. The university's primary language of instruction is English, and it accepts foreign students.

== History ==
The University of Culture (Mandalay) was officially opened on 5 November 2001 with the act No.(21/98) of the State Law and Order Restoration Council. At the beginning stage of the formation of the University of Culture, U San Win took the responsibility as a Rector on 22 December 2000 according to the meeting No.(46/2000) of the state Law and Order Restoration Council. In 2006, as the Rector U San Win was promoted to Director General of the Department of Archaeology, U Ngwe Htun took the responsibility as a Rector on 1 December 2006 to the National University of Arts and Culture (Mandalay). In May 2009, after the Rector, U Ngwe Htun's retirement, U Tin Soe, Rector of the National University of Arts and Culture (Yangon) transferred to the National University of Arts and Culture (Mandalay). At the present, U Tin Soe has been taking the responsibility of the Rector since 4 May 2009.

== Location and Area ==
The implementation plan for the construction of the University of Culture, Mandalay was initiated on 8 February 1999. It is situated on the Shwesaryan pagoda Road, Ohn Chaw Village, Patheingyi Township, Mandalay Division and the area is 41.35 acres (167,300 m^{2}).

== Programs ==
The university offers Bachelor of Arts (B.A.) degree programs in four disciplines: music, dramatic arts, painting and sculpture. Duration of study is three years for B.A. degrees and four years (full-time) for B.A. (Hons) degrees in their respective specializations. Each student is required to complete compulsory academic subjects such as English, Burmese literature, mathematics, and cultural science and history. The teaching medium is in English for most courses, except for Burmese literature.

Program	Bachelor's
Music	B.A.
Dramatic Arts	B.A.
Painting	B.A.
Sculpture	B.A.

Post-graduate studies in the above subjects as well as in Museology, Applied Archaeology and Computer Arts are available only at the University of Culture, Yangon.

== Admissions ==
All students who passed the university entrance examination and age under 20 may apply. The university also accepts foreign students with an interest to study or do research in Burmese culture (e.g., Burmese dance, sculpture and traditional Burmese musical instruments, etc.)

The number of students admitted annually is 200, 50 students for each major.

== See also ==
- University of Culture, Yangon
