= Wai La =

Burmese reggae singer-songwriter

Wai La ဝေလ
- Born: Wai Phyo Aung; 3 November 1982 (age 43); Yangon, Myanmar
- Genres: Reggae
- Occupation: Singer-songwriter
- Instruments: Vocals; guitar
- Years active: 2000–present

Wai La (Burmese: ဝေလ); born on 3 November 1982) is a Burmese reggae singer-songwriter. He is considered as one of the best present-day Burmese singers and rose to fame with his album Mate Kat Ma Kyaik Thaw Tha Chin Myar.

== Early life and education ==
Wai La was born on 3 November 1982 in Yangon, Myanmar. He is the third son of four siblings, having two elder brother and one younger brother. He attended high school at Basic Education High School No. 6 Ahlone and Basic Education High School No. 3 North Dagon.

== Career ==
Wai La started to write and compose songs in 2000. From 2000 to 2011, he wrote a lot of songs for famous artists and started endeavoring to be able to produce and distribute a solo album. On 1 July 2011, he release his debut solo album "1982". Unfortunately, the album was a failure but that did not stop him to stand up and try again. Afterwards, he participated in many group albums and also sang a lot of songs, cooperating and sang together with local artists. He has become popular due to "Kyo So Par Ei" (Welcome) song from collaborative album "Bo Bo 3rd Year Records" and "Sign Board Kai Pee Lan Shuk Mal" song from collaborative album "Shwe FM 4th Anniversary". Since then, he gained the first recognition from his fans.

His second album "Make up Ma Kyaik Thaw Tha Chin Myar" was released on 3 June 2014 which gained him recognized for his rock attitude, individual and unique style as well as the diversity of his lyrics among millions of fans. His second solo album was more successful than his first solo album – was commercial success and placed the top of the albums chart in local since its released time which turned out to be a success creating him a place to stand in Myanmar music industry. He received the "Best Rock song of the Monsoon" (Artist Choice Awards) and "Special Music Award of the Monsoon" at the 2014 Myanmar Monsoon Music Awards. In 2015, he received three music awards, "The Best Singer of the Year (Rock)", The Best Creative Album of the Year (Rock)", and "The Best Song of the Year (Rock)" with his album "Make up Ma Kyaik Thaw Tha Chin Myar" at the 2014 Myanmar Music Awards.

Wai released his third solo album "A Di Pa Ti Phwar" on 12 June 2016. The same year, he launched fourth solo album "Ku Tin Amhat 18" (Bedstead No. 18) on 3 November 2016. On 1 February 2018, he released his fifth solo album "A Tu Myar Tae Myoh" which spawned more huge hits. Many music industry records have followed since then. From 11 to 29 August, he travelled and entertained in London together with Ni Ni Khin Zaw. On 29 September 2018, Wai La embarked on his first one-man show concert "Live in 360" at the National Theatre in Yangon.

== Discography ==
=== Solo albums ===
- 1982 (2011)
- Make up Ma Kyaik Thaw Tha Chin Myar (မိတ္ကပ္မႀကိဳက္ေသာသီခ်င္းမ်ား) (2014)
- A Di Pa Ti Phwar (အဓိပတိဖြား) (2016)
- Ku Tin Amhat 18 (ကုတင္အမွတ္ ၁၈) (2016)
- A Tu Myar Tae Myoh (အတုမ်ားတဲ့ၿမိဳ႕) (2018)
- Zar Yate Ta (စာရိတၱ) (2019)
