= National University of Arts and Culture, Yangon =

Art school in Yangon, Myanmar

- အမျိုးသားယဉ်ကျေးမှုနှင့် အနုပညာတက္ကသိုလ် (ရန်ကုန်)
- Motto: စိတ္တံဒန္တံ သုခါဝဟံ cittaṃ dantaṃ sukhāvahaṃ
- Motto in English: Mind when tamed is conducive to happiness
- Type: Public
- Established: 24 September 1993; 33 years ago
- Affiliations: Ministry of Religious Affairs and Culture (Myanmar)
- Rector: U Aung Naing Myint
- Administrative staff: 149
- Students: 430
- Location: 26 Aung Zeya Road; South Dagon 11431, Yangon, Yangon Region, Myanmar; 16°51′23″N 96°13′10″E
- Website: NUAC Yangon

The National University of Arts and Culture, Yangon (Burmese: အမျိုးသားယဉ်ကျေးမှုနှင့် အနုပညာတက္ကသိုလ် (ရန်ကုန်) [jɪ̀ɰ̃tɕém̥ṵ tɛʔkəθò (jàɰ̃ɡòʊɰ̃)]) is a public university, located in Yangon, Myanmar, that offers bachelor's and post-graduate degree programs in traditional Burmese performing and visual arts. The university's primary language of instruction is English, and it accepts foreign students.

== History ==
The University of Culture was officially opened on 24 September 1993 in accordance with the Act No(71/93) of the State Law and Order Restoration Council, issued on April 20 and it was originally opened at No.131, Kaba Aye Pagoda, Kanbawza Building, Bahan Township, Yangon. On September 18, 1996, it was moved to and opened in the building of the University of Culture, Aung Zeya Road, 26th Ward, South Dagon Myothit and the area is 52-acre (210,000 m^{2}).

At the beginning stage of the formation of the University of Culture, U Maung Maung Khine took the responsibility of the Principal and on June 4, 1997, according to the Meeting No(21/97)of the State Law and Order Restoration Council, which replaced the old formation with the new one in which the Rector was in charge, the principal U Maung MaungKhine was promoted to the post of the Rector. In 1998, after the rector U Maung Maung Khine's retirement, U Zaw Than took the responsibility of the rector on June 6, 1998. When U Zaw Than was promoted to the post of the Director-General in the Department of Fine Arts, Ministry of Culture on 30 June 1999 and U Tin Soe took the responsibility of the rector.

According to the cabinet approval (40/2007), the University of Culture was changed to the National University of Arts and Culture in 2007. U Tin Soe transferred to the National University of Arts and Culture (Mandalay) and Daw Nanda Hmun has taken the responsibility of the Rector since first May 2009. The school added one-year post-graduate diploma programs in 2002.

== Programs ==
The university offers Bachelor of Arts (B.A.) degree programs in five disciplines: Cinematography & Drama, Music, Dramatic Arts, Painting and Sculpture. Duration of study is four years for BA degrees and five years (full-time) for BA (Hons) degrees in their respective specializations. Since 2002, the university has also added one-year post-graduate diploma programs and one undergraduate diploma program. Each student is required to complete compulsory academic subjects such as English, Burmese literature, mathematics, and cultural science and history. The teaching medium is in English for most courses, except for Burmese literature.

Program	Bachelor's	Post-graduate diploma
Cinematography & Drama	BA	PGDCinematography & Drama
Music	BA	PGDMusic
Dramatic Arts	BA	PGDDA
Painting	BA	PGDP
Sculpture	BA	PGDS
Applied Archaeology	<none>	PGDAA
Museology	<none>	PGDM

The university also offers an undergraduate diploma in Computer Arts.

== Admissions ==
All students who passed the University Entrance Examination and age under 20 may apply. The university also accepts foreign students with an interest to study or do research in Burmese culture (e.g., Burmese dance, sculpture and traditional Burmese musical instruments, etc.)

The number of students admitted annually is 250, 50 students for each major.

== Rectors ==
- Maung Maung Khaing (1993–1997)
- Zaw Than (1998–1999)
- Tin Soe (1999–2009)
- Nandar Hmun (2009-2010)
- Sanda Khin (2010–2011)
- Kyaw Oo (2011-2015)
- Aung Naing Myint (2015–2021)
- Dr Kay Thi Htwe (2021 to Present)

== Notable people ==
- Diramore: Winner of Myanmar Academy Award for Best Music
- Zun Than Sin: Miss Universe Myanmar 2017
- Chuu Sitt Han: Model, Singer and Actress

== See also ==
- University of Culture, Mandalay
