= Mahāgīta =

Complete body of Burmese classical songs

- Native name: မဟာဂီတ
- Etymology: Pali for 'high music'
- Other names: Thachingyi (သီချင်းကြီး 'great songs')
- Cultural origins: Pyu; Burmese; Mon; Ayutthayan
- Typical instruments: Saung; pattala; hne; fiddle; piano; drums

Other topics
- Music of Myanmar

Mahāgīta (Burmese: မဟာဂီတ; from Pali: Mahāgīta; lit. 'high music'), also rendered into Burmese as Thachingyi (Burmese: သီချင်းကြီး; lit. 'great songs'), is the complete body or corpus of Burmese classical songs. The songs descend from the musical traditions of the Burmese royal court, and form the basis of Burmese classical music today. Mahāgīta songs continue to be played during Buddhist rituals, weddings, and public festivals, and performers frequently appear on state-run television shows.

== History ==
The Mahāgīta evolved into a single style from Pyu, Mon, and Burman musical traditions. The Mahāgīta also incorporates musical traditions of conquered kingdoms; the Yodaya songs are modeled on the musical style of the Ayutthaya kingdom, while the Talaing songs are based on the songs of the Mon people.

=== Pre-colonial origins ===
Kyo, bwe, and thachingan songs are considered to constitute the oldest parts of the Mahāgīta repertoire, serving as the main court music before the Konbaung dynasty. The earliest genre of kyo songs date to the late Kingdom of Ava era. Kyo songs, which literally means "string," were used as repertoire to teach traditional classical singing and the saung. The oldest songs of the kyo genre are the "Three Barge Songs," which describe a king's passage up the Irrawaddy River to Tagaung in c. 1370, have variously been dated to the late Toungoo period (1531–1752). The "Three Barge Songs" include "Phaung Ngin Kyo," (ဖောင်ငင်ကြိုး) played as the barge is towed out; "Phaung La Kyo," (ဖောင်လားကြိုး) played as the royal barge is underway; and "Phaung Saik Kyo," (ဖောင်စိုက်ကြိုး), played when the barge makes port.

Bwe songs honor the king, while thachingan songs honor the Buddha or the king as a protector of the Sāsana. Both genres date to the Konbaung dynasty, c. 1738. Myawaddy Mingyi U Sa was the most prominent composer of songs in the bwe and thachingan genres.

Patpyo songs were popular in the late Konbaung dynasty, and are the most numerous in the corpus. These songs have a rhythmic foundation resembling drumbeats, and require the highest level of performance technique and knowledge. Ledwethankhat songs constitute a minor genre, and are characteristically sharp and active, with fast, short rhythms. These songs are always followed by myingin songs traditionally performed at equestrian, martial arts, and archery events.

Bawle songs, which are plaintive songs, date to the 1800s; the earliest song, "Sein Chu Kya Naung" (စိန်ခြူးကြာညောင်), composed by a Konbaung princess to persuade her husband to return to her side, was composed after 1838.

=== Colonial era evolution ===
From the 1910s to the 1950s, with the advent of British colonial rule in Burma, a new genre of traditional music, variously called khit haung (ခေတ်ဟောင်း; lit. 'old era'), hnaung khit (နှောင်းခေတ်, lit. 'late era'), and kala paw (ကာလပေါ်, lit. 'current [era]') emerged. While the roots of this genre lie in the pre-colonial court tradition, compositions from this genre gradually incorporated Western musical instruments (e.g., the piano, guitar, banjo, etc.) and foreign musical influences in terms of melody, tunings, and rhythm (e.g., harmony in thirds, accented rhythm in vocals), which did not adhere to the strict rules of the royal court musical tradition. From the 1920s to the 1940s, the introduction of recording technology created a sizable local market for khit haung music. The Ministry of Information completed the first volume of khit haung music transcriptions in 1999. State-run MRTV publishes multi-volume written compilation of songs from this genre.

=== Modern-day preservation ===
The Mahāgīta has faced challenges with preservation. The oral tradition remains the primary mode of musical transmission. In the 1990s, the Burmese government, under the Ministry of Information, began to standardise and notate the entire repertoire of classical Burmese music. However, this approach has been limited by the Western notation system, which cannot capture the flexibility of Burmese rhythm, the two-part style, and a loose floating rhythmic organisation, including free-style embellishments, all of which distinguish traditional Burmese music from other musical traditions in the region (e.g., Thailand, China, India).

== Collections ==
The Mahāgīta is generally organised into songs by genre based on varying tuning methods, rhythmic patterns, frequently used melodies, preludes and postludes, as follows:

- Kyo (ကြိုး)
- Bwe (ဘွဲ့)
- Thachingan (သီချင်းခံ)
- Patpyo (ပတ်ပျိုး)
- Ledwethankhat (လေးထွေသံကပ်)
- Natchin (နတ်ချင်း)
- Yodaya (ယိုးဒယား)
- Bawle (ဘောလယ်)
- Lwangyin (လွမ်းချင်း)
- Myingin (မြင်းခင်း)
- Talaing than (တလိုင်းသံ)

In the Gitawithawdani anthology, the songs are grouped into 4 categories, known as apaing (အပိုင်း). Each category has a specific tuning method, namely hnyinlon, aukpyan, pale, and myinzaing. The remaining 2 tuning methods, duraka and chauk thwe nyunt, are now extinct.

== Ensemble ==
Mahāgīta songs are sung by a vocalist who controls the metric cycle by playing a bell (စည်, si) and clappers (ဝါး, wa). The vocal performances are accompanied by a chamber music ensemble, which includes the following instruments:

- Saung (စောင်း) - Burmese harp
- Pattala (ပတ္တလား) - xylophone
- Hne (နှဲကြီး) - double-reed oboe
- Si (စည်း) and wa (ဝါး) - bell and clapper
- Bon (ဗုံ) - double-headed drum
- Tayaw (တယော) - fiddle
- Sandaya (စန္ဒရား) - piano

The tayaw and sandaya are historically recent additions dating to the Konbaung dynasty (mid-to-late 1800s).

=== Piano (Sandaya) ===
The piano, called sandaya (Burmese: စန္ဒရား), was introduced to the Burmese musical repertoire during the mid-19th century Konbaung dynasty, first as a gift by the Italian ambassador to King Mindon Min. The instrument was quickly indigenised by Burmese court musicians and uses a novel playing technique adapted to play Mahāgīta compositions. Prominent Burmese pianists often prefix their name with the honorific 'Sandaya' (e.g., Sandayar Hla Htut and Sandayar Chit Swe).

Burmese musicians use a "technique of interlocked fingering with both hands extending a single melodic line allowed for agogic embellishment, fleeting grace notes in syncopated spirals around a steady underlying beat found in the bell and clapper time keepers." This playing technique is based on the two-mallet technique of the pattala, a bamboo xylophone, and the two-hand technique of the pat waing, a drum circle. By contrast, Western playing styles feature melody with the right hand, and supporting harmonies with the left hand. The Burmese technique allows for very rapid playing, enabling musicians to layer complex and distinct ornamentations, which evoke the expressive techniques used in traditional Burmese singing. The Burmese style is characterised by prominent use of virtuosity and ornamentation, with alternating sections of free and fixed, but flexible, rhythm.

== Anthologies ==
The national anthology, known as Naingngandaw Mu Mahagita (နိုင်ငံတော်မူမဟာဂီတ) includes a selection of 169 songs, standardised and published in three volumes between 1954 and 1961 by Burmese Ministry of Culture. The National University of Arts and Culture, Yangon uses the Naingngandaw Mu Mahagita as the official anthology for teaching Burmese classical music. This anthology is also used for the National Performing Arts Competition (also known as Sokayeti) held annually in October.

The Naingngandaw Mu Mahagita anthology is based on an earlier anthology, entitled Gitawithawdani (ဂီတဝိသောဓနီ; from Pali Gītavisodhana, lit. 'purifying the songs'), published in 1923, which was based on the repertoire of the last Burmese court harpist, Dewaeinda Maung Maung Gyi (ဒေဝဣန္ဒာမောင်မောင်ကြီး). The second edition was edited and recompiled by Ba Cho and republished in 1941, and is now in its sixth reprint.

The oldest extant song anthology was compiled c. 1788 by the Monywe Sayadaw (1766–1834), and comprises 166 sets of song texts. Several Konbaung dynasty anthologies exist, including an 1849 anthology compiled by Myawaddy Mingyi U Sa and another 1870 anthology, Thachin Gaungzin Potye Hmatsudaw (သီချင်းခေါင်းစဉ်ပုဒ်ရေးမှတ်စုတော်) with 1,062 song titles under 27 genres, both compiled at the behest of Mindon Min, and an 1881 anthology named Mahagita Myedani Kyan (မဟာဂီတမြေဓနီကျမ်း), compiled by U Yauk in Pyay.

== Modern-day usage ==
The popularity of the Mahāgīta genre in modern-day Myanmar has declined significantly with the advent of popular music. Some songs in the Mahāgīta corpus remain staples for various traditional ceremonies. A bwe song called "Aura of Immeasurable Auspiciousness" (အတိုင်းမသိမင်္ဂလာသြဘာဘွဲ့, Ataing Mathi Mingala Awba Bwe) is used as a wedding processional song in traditional Burmese weddings (analogous to the "Bridal Chorus" in Western weddings). The style of Mahāgīta songs has also been adapted in more modern compositions, such as "Auspicious Song" (မင်္ဂလာတေး, Mingala Tei) composed by Twante Thein Tan, and "Akadaw Pei" (အခါတော်ပေး) by Waing Lamin Aung, both of which are commonly played at traditional Burmese weddings.

== Recordings ==
- Mahagita: Harp and Vocal Music of Burma (2003)

== See also ==
- Music of Myanmar
