= Soe Lwin Lwin =

Burmese singer-songwriter (1962–1999)

Soe Lwin Lwin စိုးလွင်လွင်
- Born: 18 September 1962; Rangoon, Burma
- Died: 25 July 1999 (aged 36) Yangon, Myanmar
- Genre: Burmese pop
- Occupations: Singer-songwriter; composer
- Instrument: Vocals
- Years active: 1982-1999

Soe Lwin Lwin (Burmese: စိုးလွင်လွင်; pronounced [só lwɪ̀ɰ̃ lwɪ̀ɰ̃]; 18 September 1962 – 25 July 1999), also known as Po Po (Burmese: ပိုပို; Burmese pronunciation: [pò pò]), was a Burmese singer-composer who penned several songs for successful singers such as Kaiser, Hlwan Moe and Maung Galon. Some of his successful songs include "Chit Lu-Maik", "A-May", "Maung Myet Yay Waing","Nge-Thu-Moh" and "Ko-Gyin Sa-Na Ge Ya Bi Lay".

He died in Yangon on 25 July 1999.

== Album discography ==
- 1984: Chit Lu Mite
- 1988: Kyun Taw Ma Thi Tae Kyun Taw
- 1988: Mar Na Myat Nhar
- 1990: Maung Myat Yay Wine
- 1991: Chit Tae Nyein
- 1991: Kar Yan Thit
- 1991: Myat Nar Ma Myar Tap Par
- 1992: Than Sin Thit
- 1993: Lat Saung Thit
- 1993: Myarr
- 1993: Khun Arr Myar Par
- 1994: Sein
- 1994: Mat Khwint
- 1995: Luu Soe Tway Nae Maung Taing Pin
- 1999: Shwe Yaung At Htote Pat Ti
