= The Mask Singer Myanmar =

Burmese reality music game show

- Logo
- Genre: Reality television, variety show, music
- Directed by: Zaw Min Aung
- Presented by: Paing Zay Ye Htun
- Starring: A Yine; Khine Thin Kyi; Htun Htun; Yadanar My; Nga Pyaw Kyaw; Khin Zarchi Kyaw; Sandy Myint Lwin; Phyo Ngwe Soe
- Country of origin: Myanmar
- Original language: Burmese
- No. of seasons: 3
- No. of episodes: 16 + 20 + 20 (56)

Production
- Executive producer: Zaw Min Aung
- Running time: 90 minutes
- Production company: Shwe Than Lwin Media

Original release
- Network: Channel ME; Channel 9
- Release: 15 November 2019 – present

Related
- Masked Singer

The Mask Singer Myanmar is a singing competition television program presented by Paing Zay Ye Htun. It was based on the South Korea singing competition King of Mask Singer. Celebrity detectives were A Yine, Khine Thin Kyi, Htun Htun, Yadanar My. In season 2, Nga Pyaw Kyaw, Khin Zarchi Kyaw and Sandy Myint Lwin came as the new guessing mask celebrities. In season 3, Phyo Ngwe Soe came as the new guessing mask celebrity.

== Game format ==
Celebrities compete on the show anonymously by wearing costumes over a series of episodes. In each episode, some of the competitors are paired off into face-off competitions, in which each will perform a song of his or her choice in their real voice. From each face-off, the judges and live audience will vote for their favourites: the winner is safe for the week, while the loser is put up for elimination and then takes off their mask to reveal the identity.

== Cast ==
=== Presenters ===
Presenters	Season 1 (2019 – 2020)	Season 2 (2024)	Season 3 (2026)
Paing Zay Ye Htun			

=== Panelists ===
Panelists	Season 1 (2019 – 2020)	Season 2 (2024)	Season 3 (2026)
A Yine			
Khine Thin Kyi			
Yadanar My			
Htun Htun			
Nga Pyaw Kyaw			
Khin Zarchi Kyaw			
Sandy Myint Lwin			
Phyo Ngwe Soe			

== Contestants ==
=== Season 1 ===
- Sin Pauk as "Peacock"
- Lain Maw Thee as "Pineapple"
- He Lay as "Pirate"
- Ei Si Kway as "Puppet"
- Kay Kay Moe as "Watermelon"
- Nay Nay as "Piggy"
- Nang Khin Zay Yar as "Ice Cream"
- Aung Myint Myat as "Crow"
- Ma Htet as "Cat"
- Min Maw Kun as "Anubis"
- A Thin Cho Swe as "Dragon"
- Wai Gyi as "Zawgyi"
- Oak Soe Khant as "Alien"
- Aung Ye Htike as "Phoe Wa"
- Po Po Heather as "Banana"
- Kyaw Htoo as "Yaksha"
- Han Thi as "Owl"
- Paing Takhon as "Tiger"

=== Season 2 ===
- Rebecca Win as "Butterfly"
- Pu Sue as "Hero"
- Ngwe Zin Hlaine as "Hotpot"
- Mi Sandi as "Doll"
- Nyi Htut Khaung as "Cake"
- Soe Pyae Thazin as "Cleopatra"
- Phyo Myat Aung as "Scarecrow"
- Phyo Ngwe Soe as "Hamburger"
- Chan Thar as "Clocktower"
- Nay Toe as "Samurai"
- Warso Moe Oo as "Ladybug"
- Kyaw Kyaw Bo as "Joker Corn"
- Kyaw Kyaw as "Squirrel"
- Lin Zarni Zaw as "Ironwood Flower"
- Khin San Win as "Dragon Fruit"
- Htet Inzali as "Rose"
- Phyo Lay as "Star Fruit"
- Po Po as "Elephant Mo Mo"

=== Season 3 ===
- Phyo Kyaw Htike as "Cassette Rockstar"
- Khin Poe Panchi as "Strawberry"
- Poe Mi as "Lady Cow"
- Nyein Thaw as "Parrot"
- Thar Nge as "Pyit Taing Htaung"
- Do Pauk as "Custard Apple"
- Thet Htar Thuzar as "Dragonfly"
- Chaw Yadanar as "Chrysanthemum"
- Vita Min as "King Fox"
- May Kabyar as "Chili Girl"
- Nyi Min Khaing as "Mirror Man"
- Ye Lay as "Pot Drum"
- Heavy Phyo as "Cupid"
- Nann Myat Phyo Thinn as "Cherry Blossom"
- Aye Myat Thu as "Golden Deer"
- Lwin Moe as "Panda"
- Zwe Pyae as "Sticky Rice Wrap"
- San Htate Htar Oo as "Princess Bunny"

== Series overview ==
Season	No. of groups	No. of stars	Duration dates	Celebrities Honor Place	
Season	No. of groups	No. of stars	Duration dates	Winner	Second place
1) 2019–20	6	18	15 November 2019 – 21 February 2020	Sin Pauk as "Peacock"	Lain Maw Thee as "Pineapple"
2) 2024	6	18	21 June 2024 – 1 November 2024	Rebecca Win as "Butterfly"	Pu Sue as "Hero"
3) 2026	6	18	6 March 2026 – 24 July 2026	Phyo Kyaw Htike as "Cassette Rockstar"	Khin Poe Panchi as "Strawberry"
