= Thinzar =

Burmese actress

- သင်ဇာ
- Born: သဉ္ဇာ May 19, 2000 (age 25); Yangon, Myanmar
- Citizenship: Myanmar
- Education: BA(Hons) at East Yangon University
- Occupations: Actress, model
- Years active: 2019 – present
- Parent(s): Myo Myint Naing; Baby aka Khin Nwe Yi

Thinzar (Burmese: သင်ဇာ or သဉ္ဇာ; born 19 May 2000) is a Burmese actress and model. She rose to fame after debuting in the 2022 TV drama Trapped. She is the younger sister of actress, Warso Moe Oo.

== Early life and education ==
Thinzar was born on 19 May 2000 in Yangon, Myanmar to parents Myo Myint Naing and Baby aka Khin Nwe Yi. She is the youngest daughter of two siblings, having Warso Moe Oo as an elder sister. She attended high school at Basic Education High School No. 2 Latha. After the high school graduation, she went on to pursue international relations major at East Yangon University which she graduated with honours in the year of 2022.

== Acting career ==
Thinzar's acting career did not start until her freshman year of 2019. With the support of her sister, she gained recognition of the audiences in a short period of time. She landed her debut role in Trapped series on Canal+. The series was nominated for "National Winner 2022 Best Darama Series" at Asian Academy Creative Awards. Ever since then, she has been acting in several tv series. In between starring for tv series and movies, she models for commercials and music videos.

== Filmography ==
=== Films ===
Year	English title	Myanmar Title	Network	Co-Stars	Note
2023	Nya Eainmat	ည အိပ်မက်	SKYNET	Yarwana	
2023	Mama Doh Thingyan	မမတို့ သင်္ကြန်	SKYNET	Khin San Win, Lin Linn	

=== Television series ===
Year	English title	Myanmar Title	Network	Note
2022	Trapped	ဗလာစာအုပ်	Canal+	
2023	My Dear You			
2023	Pyinsama Myout Potesar	ပဉ္စမမြောက် ပုစ္ဆာ	Fortune TV	
2023	Nway Ouak Aww	နွေဥသြ	Channel K	
2023	Lucky	လပ်ကီး		TBA

=== Music Videos ===
- Phyo Pyae sone – Nout So Yin နောက်ဆိုရင် (2018)
- Oak Soe Khant – Paing Shin ပိုင်ရှင် (2020)
- G Fatt x Wink – Radio (2022)
