= The Mask Singer Myanmar season 2 =

Season of The Mask Singer Myanmar

The Mask Singer Myanmar
- Season 2
- poster
- Starring: Nga Pyaw Kyaw; Khin Zarchi Kyaw; Htun Htun; Sandy Myint Lwin
- Hosted by: Paing Zay Ye Htun
- Winner: Rebecca Win as "Butterfly"
- Runner-up: Pu Sue as "Hero"
- No. of episodes: 20

Release
- Original network: Channel 9
- Original release: 21 June – 1 November 2024

Season chronology
- ← Previous; Season 1 Next → Season 3

The second season of The Mask Singer Myanmar premiered on 21 June 2024, and lasted for 20 episodes. On 1 November 2024, the Butterfly (singer Rebecca Win) was declared the winner, and the Hero (singer Pu Sue) the runner-up.

== Contestants ==
Stage name	Celebrity	Occupation	Episodes																		
Stage name	Celebrity	Occupation	1	2	3	4	5	6	7	8	9	10	11	12	13	14	15	16	17	18	19
Stage name	Celebrity	Occupation	Group A, B, C									Group D, E, F									19
Butterfly (လိပ်ပြာ)	Rebecca Win	Singer	SAFE	SAFE			SAFE		WIN		WIN										WINNER
Hero (သူရဲကောင်း)	Pu Sue	Musician										SAFE	SAFE			SAFE		WIN		WIN	RUNNER-UP
Hotpot (ဟော့ပေါ့)	Ngwe Zin Hline	Singer										SAFE			SAFE	SAFE			WIN	OUT	
Doll (အရုပ်မယ်)	Mi Sandi	Musician										SAFE		SAFE			SAFE		OUT		
Cake (ကိတ်)	Nyi Htut Khaung	Actor										SAFE			SAFE		SAFE	OUT			
Cleopatra (ကလီယိုပတ်ထရာ)	Soe Pyae Thazin	Actress										SAFE	SAFE				OUT				
Scarecrow (ကျီးကန်း)	Phyo Myat Aung	Singer										SAFE		SAFE		OUT					
Hamburger (ဟမ်ဘာဂါ)	Phyo Ngwe Soe	Actor										SAFE			OUT						
Clocktower (နာရီစင်)	U Chan Thar	Dancer										SAFE		OUT							
Samurai (ဆာမူရိုင်း)	Nay Toe	Actor										SAFE	OUT								
Ladybug (လေဒီဘတ်)	Warso Moe Oo	Actress	SAFE			SAFE		SAFE		WIN	OUT										
Joker Corn (ဂျိုကာပြောင်းဖူး)	Kyaw Kyaw Bo	Actor	SAFE		SAFE			SAFE		OUT											
Squirrel (ရှဉ့်)	Kyaw Kyaw	Actor	SAFE			SAFE	SAFE		OUT												
Ironwood Flower (ကံ့ကော်)	Lin Zarni Zaw	Actress	SAFE	SAFE				OUT													
Dragonfruit (နဂါးမောက်သီး)	Khin San Win	Makeup Artist	SAFE		SAFE		OUT														
Rose (နှင်းဆီ)	Htet Inzali	Singer	SAFE			OUT															
Starfruit (စောင်းလျားသီး)	Phyo Lay	Rapper	SAFE		OUT																
Elephant Mo Mo (မိုမို)	Po Po	Singer	SAFE	OUT																	

== Group A, B, C ==
=== Week 1: Group A, B, C introducing (June.21) ===
Date	Order	Group	Stage Name	Song
Episode 1 (Friday, June 21, 2024)	1	A	Elephant Mo Mo	"Ko Twae Mak Tan"
Episode 1 (Friday, June 21, 2024)	1	A	Butterfly	"Ko Twae Mak Tan"
Episode 1 (Friday, June 21, 2024)	1	A	Ironwood Flower	"Ko Twae Mak Tan"
Episode 1 (Friday, June 21, 2024)	2	B	Joker Corn	"Hsu Taung"
Episode 1 (Friday, June 21, 2024)	2	B	Star Fruit	"Hsu Taung"
Episode 1 (Friday, June 21, 2024)	2	B	Dragon Fruit	"Hsu Taung"
Episode 1 (Friday, June 21, 2024)	3	C	Ladybug	"Htit Chone Moe"
Episode 1 (Friday, June 21, 2024)	3	C	Squirrel	"Htit Chone Moe"
Episode 1 (Friday, June 21, 2024)	3	C	Rose	"Htit Chone Moe"

=== Week 2: Group A 1st round (June.28) ===
Date	Order	Group	Stage Name	Song	Identity	Result	Unmasked song
Episode 2 (Friday, June 28, 2024)	1	A	Elephant Mo Mo	"Shin Bayin Lay"	Po Po	OUT	"Sorry"
Episode 2 (Friday, June 28, 2024)	2	A	Butterfly	"Ta Sa Si Kyo Pae Nay"	undisclosed	SAFE	—N/a
Episode 2 (Friday, June 28, 2024)	3	A	Ironwood Flower	"Kalay Atway"	undisclosed	SAFE	—N/a

=== Week 3: Group B 1st round (July.5) ===
Date	Order	Group	Stage Name	Song	Identity	Result	Unmasked song
Episode 3 (Friday, July 5, 2024)	1	B	Joker Corn	"A Yuu A Muu Pae Kalay Yal"	undisclosed	SAFE	—N/a
Episode 3 (Friday, July 5, 2024)	2	B	Star Fruit	"D Ka Chit Lite Ya Tar"	Phyo Lay	OUT	"Shi Toh Shi Tal Shar Tal"
Episode 3 (Friday, July 5, 2024)	3	B	Dragon Fruit	"Kar Yan Lay"	undisclosed	SAFE	—N/a

=== Week 4: Group C 1st round (July.12) ===
Date	Order	Group	Stage Name	Song	Identity	Result	Unmasked song
Episode 4 (Friday, July 12, 2024)	1	C	Ladybug	"Ko Yan Taw"	undisclosed	SAFE	—N/a
Episode 4 (Friday, July 12, 2024)	2	C	Squirrel	"Mar Yar"	undisclosed	SAFE	—N/a
Episode 4 (Friday, July 12, 2024)	3	C	Rose	"Stand by Me"	Htet Inzali	OUT	"Save Me"

=== Week 5: Group A, B, C 2nd round day 1 (July.19) ===
Date	Order	Group	Stage Name	Song	Identity	Result	Unmasked song
Episode 5 (Friday, July 19, 2024)	1	A	Butterfly	"Chit Lite Toh One, Two, Three"	undisclosed	SAFE	—N/a
Episode 5 (Friday, July 19, 2024)	2	B	Dragon Fruit	"Winga Dipani Yauk Kyar"	Khin San Win	OUT	"Kan Satt Nae Yay Hline"
Episode 5 (Friday, July 19, 2024)	3	C	Squirrel	"Naung Ta"	undisclosed	SAFE	—N/a

=== Week 6: Group A, B, C 2nd round day 2 (July.26) ===
Date	Order	Group	Stage Name	Song	Identity	Result	Unmasked song
Episode 6 (Friday, July 26, 2024)	1	A	Ironwood Flower	"A Thae Nu Toh Kyauk Tar Poh"	Lin Zarni Zaw	OUT	"Myet Won Sakar"
Episode 6 (Friday, July 26, 2024)	2	B	Joker Corn	"Chit Tal"	undisclosed	SAFE	—N/a
Episode 6 (Friday, July 26, 2024)	3	C	Ladybug	"A Chit Sone Mo Pyaw Pya Chin Par Tal"	undisclosed	SAFE	—N/a

=== Week 7: Group A, B, C Semi-final day 1 (August.2) ===
Date	Order	Group	Stage Name	Song	Battle Song	Identity	Result	Unmasked song
Episode 7 (Friday, August 2, 2024)	1	A	Butterfly	"A Thae Kwae A Htain A Mak"	"Lu Oo Yay Than Paung Chauk Htaung Htae Ka A Chit"	undisclosed	WIN	—N/a
Episode 7 (Friday, August 2, 2024)	2	C	Squirrel	"Paing Shin"	"Lu Oo Yay Than Paung Chauk Htaung Htae Ka A Chit"	Kyaw Kyaw	OUT	"Shay Shay Tone Ka Pone Pyin Lay"

=== Week 8: Group A, B, C Semi-final day 2 (August.9) ===
Date	Order	Group	Stage Name	Song	Battle Song	Identity	Result	Unmasked song
Episode 8 (Friday, August 9, 2024)	1	C	Ladybug	"Yone Tal Hoke"	"Ta Lain Hna Lain"	undisclosed	WIN	—N/a
Episode 8 (Friday, August 9, 2024)	2	B	Joker Corn	"Thwar Ma Yone Buu"	"Ta Lain Hna Lain"	Kyaw Kyaw Bo	OUT	"A Paw Htat Nae Aut Htat Zat Lenn"

=== Week 9: Group A, B, C Final round (August.16) ===
Date	Order	Group	Stage Name	Song	Battle Song	Identity	Result	Unmasked song
Episode 9 (Friday, August 16, 2024)	1	A	Butterfly	"Chit Thu Maung"	"Koh A Twat Eain Met Min Met Lar"	undisclosed	WIN	—N/a
Episode 9 (Friday, August 16, 2024)	2	C	Ladybug	"Dan Yar So Tar A Chit"	"Koh A Twat Eain Met Min Met Lar"	Warso Moe Oo	OUT	"Thay Char Loh Lar"

== Group D, E, F ==
=== Week 10: Group D, E, F introducing (August.23) ===
Date	Order	Group	Stage Name	Song
Episode 10 (Friday, August 23, 2024)	1	D	Samurai	"Pae Kai"
Episode 10 (Friday, August 23, 2024)	1	D	Hero	"Pae Kai"
Episode 10 (Friday, August 23, 2024)	1	D	Cleopatra	"Pae Kai"
Episode 10 (Friday, August 23, 2024)	2	E	Doll	"Yaw Gar"
Episode 10 (Friday, August 23, 2024)	2	E	Clocktower	"Yaw Gar"
Episode 10 (Friday, August 23, 2024)	2	E	Scarecrow	"Yaw Gar"
Episode 10 (Friday, August 23, 2024)	3	F	Hotpot	"Win Thet Htwet Thet Myar"
Episode 10 (Friday, August 23, 2024)	3	F	Cake	"Win Thet Htwet Thet Myar"
Episode 10 (Friday, August 23, 2024)	3	F	Hamburger	"Win Thet Htwet Thet Myar"

=== Week 11: Group D 1st round (August.30) ===
Date	Order	Group	Stage Name	Song	Identity	Result	Unmasked song
Episode 11 (Friday, August 30, 2024)	1	D	Samurai	"Sate Ku Lay Ywat Lwint Mal"	Nay Toe	OUT	"Lay Hnin Tain"
Episode 11 (Friday, August 30, 2024)	2	D	Hero	"Chit Pyee Ma Toh"	undisclosed	SAFE	—N/a
Episode 11 (Friday, August 30, 2024)	3	D	Cleopatra	"A Thae Khwae Ba Yin Ma"	undisclosed	SAFE	—N/a

=== Week 12: Group E 1st round (September.6) ===
Date	Order	Group	Stage Name	Song	Identity	Result	Unmasked song
Episode 12 (Friday, September 6, 2024)	1	E	Doll	"Sin Sar Kar Nay Ya Oo Mal"	undisclosed	SAFE	—N/a
Episode 12 (Friday, September 6, 2024)	2	E	Clocktower	"Hna Par Thwar Lay Ka Chin Pyi"	Chan Thar	OUT	"Nghat Ka Lay Myar A Thwin"
Episode 12 (Friday, September 6, 2024)	3	E	Scarecrow	"A Yin Nay Yar"	undisclosed	SAFE	—N/a

=== Week 13: Group F 1st round (September.13) ===
Date	Order	Group	Stage Name	Song	Identity	Result	Unmasked song
Episode 13 (Friday, September 13, 2024)	1	F	Hotpot	"Yote Soe Ma"	undisclosed	SAFE	—N/a
Episode 13 (Friday, September 13, 2024)	2	F	Cake	"Pyaw Aung Htar Mal Sate Cha Par"	undisclosed	SAFE	—N/a
Episode 13 (Friday, September 13, 2024)	3	F	Hamburger	"Ta Mi Nit Nauk Kya"	Phyo Ngwe Soe	OUT	"Hsu"

=== Week 14: Group D, E, F 2nd round day 1 (September.20) ===
Date	Order	Group	Stage Name	Song	Identity	Result	Unmasked song
Episode 14 (Friday, September 20, 2024)	1	D	Hero	"A Yet Cho A Chit Khar"	undisclosed	SAFE	—N/a
Episode 14 (Friday, September 20, 2024)	2	E	Scarecrow	"Dan Dar Yi Kyun"	Phyo Myat Aung	OUT	"A Lwan Shein"
Episode 14 (Friday, September 20, 2024)	3	F	Hotpot	"Kyay Kyun"	undisclosed	SAFE	—N/a

=== Week 15: Group D, E, F 2nd round day 2 (September.27) ===
Date	Order	Group	Stage Name	Song	Identity	Result	Unmasked song
Episode 15 (Friday, September 27, 2024)	1	D	Cleopatra	"Lar Mae Hnit Mar Yee Sar Htar Mal"	Soe Pyae Thazin	OUT	"A Pyit Myin Ma Lar"
Episode 15 (Friday, September 27, 2024)	2	E	Doll	"Mi Toh Mi Tal"	undisclosed	SAFE	—N/a
Episode 15 (Friday, September 27, 2024)	3	F	Cake	"Pyit Ma Htar Nae Ma Yal"	undisclosed	SAFE	—N/a

=== Week 16: Group D, E, F Semi-final day 1 (October.4) ===
Date	Order	Group	Stage Name	Song	Battle Song	Identity	Result	Unmasked song
Episode 16 (Friday, October 4, 2024)	1	D	Hero	"Sar Mar Pae"	"Sin Sar Pyee Chit"	undisclosed	WIN	—N/a
Episode 16 (Friday, October 4, 2024)	2	F	Cake	"Myo A Win Nya"	"Sin Sar Pyee Chit"	Nyi Htut Khaung	OUT	"Ma Ma"

=== Week 17: Group D, E, F Semi-final day 2 (October.11) ===
Date	Order	Group	Stage Name	Song	Battle Song	Identity	Result	Unmasked song
Episode 17 (Friday, October 11, 2024)	1	F	Hotpot	"Diamonds"	"Ta Kal Pal Lae Nin Ma Chit Bae Nae"	undisclosed	WIN	—N/a
Episode 17 (Friday, October 11, 2024)	2	E	Doll	"A Nar Nar Shi Tae A Khite"	"Ta Kal Pal Lae Nin Ma Chit Bae Nae"	Mi Sandi	OUT	"A Thel Lay"

=== Week 18: Group D, E, F Final round (October.18) ===
Date	Order	Group	Stage Name	Song	Battle Song	Identity	Result	Unmasked song
Episode 18 (Friday, October 18, 2024)	1	D	Hero	"Lyo Hwet Htar Tal"	"Main Ka Lay Ta Yauk Ko Chit Mi Yin"	undisclosed	WIN	—N/a
Episode 18 (Friday, October 18, 2024)	2	F	Hotpot	"Kabar Gyi Kyin Tal So Pay Mae"	"Main Ka Lay Ta Yauk Ko Chit Mi Yin"	Ngwe Zin Hline	OUT	"You Toh Ka Bar Lal"

== Grand Final & Champion Celebration ==
=== Week 19: Grand Final (October.25) ===
Date	Order	Group	Stage Name	Song	Battle song	Identity	Result	Unmasked song
Episode 9 (Friday, October 25, 2024)	1	A	Butterfly	"D Kaung Ma Lay Kyite Tal So Pyee"	"A Mat Ta Ya"	undisclosed	WINNER	—N/a
Episode 9 (Friday, October 25, 2024)	2	D	Hero	"Ta Nay Sar A Lwae Myar"	"A Mat Ta Ya"	Pu Sue	RUNNER-UP	"Won Khan Par"

=== Week 20: Champion Celebration (November.1) ===
Date	Order	Stage Name	Identity	Song	Note
Episode 20 (Friday, November 1, 2024)	1	—N/a	Phyo Ngwe Soe, Ngwe Zin Hline	"Win Thet Htwet Thet Myar"	Guest performers
Episode 20 (Friday, November 1, 2024)	2	Butterfly	undisclosed	"Phan Tee Ma Ya Tae A Chit"	—N/a
Episode 20 (Friday, November 1, 2024)	3	Butterfly	undisclosed	"A Yin Lo Pae A Yin A Taine Pae", "Diary Lay Thet Thay", "Ma Ma A Htar"	—N/a
Episode 20 (Friday, November 1, 2024)	4	Butterfly	Rebecca Win	"Angel" (Unmasked song)	—N/a
