= The Mask Singer Myanmar season 1 =

Season of The Mask Singer Myanmar

The Mask Singer Myanmar
- Season 1
- poster
- Starring: Ah Yine; Khine Thin Kyi; Htun Htun; Yadanar My
- Hosted by: Paing Zay Ye Htun
- Winner: Sin Pauk as "Peacock"
- Runner-up: Lain Maw Thee as "Pineapple"
- No. of episodes: 16

Release
- Original network: Channel ME
- Original release: 15 November 2019 – 28 February 2020

Season chronology
- Next → Season 2

The first season of The Mask Singer Myanmar premiered on 15 November 2019, and lasted for 16 episodes. On 28 February 2020, the Peacock (singer Sin Pauk) was declared the winner, and the Pineapple (singer Lain Maw Thee) the runner-up.

== Contestants ==
Stage Name	Celebrity	Occupation	Episodes														
Stage Name	Celebrity	Occupation	1	2	3	4	5	6	7	8	9	10	11	12	13	14	15
Stage Name	Celebrity	Occupation	Group A, B, C							Group D, E, F							15
Peacock (ဒေါင်း)	Sin Pauk	Singer								SAFE	SAFE			WIN		WIN	WINNER
Pineapple (နာနတ်သီး)	Lain Maw Thee	Musician	SAFE			SAFE		WIN	WIN								RUNNER-UP
Pirate (ပင်လယ်ဓားပြ)	He' Lay	Singer								SAFE			SAFE		WIN	OUT	
Puppet (ရုပ်သေး)	Eisi Kway	Actor								SAFE		SAFE			OUT		
Watermelon (ဖရဲသီး)	Kay Kay Moe	Singer								SAFE	SAFE				OUT		
Piggy (ပစ်ဂီ)	Nay Nay	Musician								SAFE		SAFE		OUT			
Ice Cream (ရေခဲမုန့်)	Nang Khin Zay Yar	Model								SAFE			SAFE	OUT			
Crow (ကျီးကန်း)	Aung Myint Myat	Singer								SAFE			OUT				
Cat (ကြောင်)	Ma Htet	Makeup Artist								SAFE		OUT					
Anubis (အနူးဘစ်)	Min Maw Kun	Actor								SAFE	OUT						
Dragon (နဂါး)	Athin Cho Swe	Singer	SAFE	SAFE			WIN		OUT								
Zawgyi (ဇော်ဂျီ)	Wai Gyi	Musician	SAFE		SAFE			OUT									
Alien (ဂြိုဟ်သား)	Oak Soe Khant	Musician	SAFE	SAFE				OUT									
Phoe Wa (ဖိုးဝ)	Aung Ye Htike	Actor	SAFE			SAFE	OUT										
Banana (သီးမွှေး)	Po Po Heather	Singer	SAFE		SAFE		OUT										
Yaksha (ယက္ခ)	Kyaw Htoo	Actor	SAFE			OUT											
Owl (ဇီးကွက်)	Han Thi	Actress	SAFE		OUT												
Tiger (ကျား)	Paing Takhon	Model	SAFE	OUT													

== Group A, B, C ==
=== Week 1: Group A, B, C introducing (November.15) ===
Date	Order	Group	Stage Name	Song
Episode 1 (Friday, November 15, 2019)	1	A	Dragon	"Mhar Tae Bet Mhar"
Episode 1 (Friday, November 15, 2019)	1	A	Alien	"Mhar Tae Bet Mhar"
Episode 1 (Friday, November 15, 2019)	1	A	Tiger	"Mhar Tae Bet Mhar"
Episode 1 (Friday, November 15, 2019)	2	B	Banana	"Thabawa Yae Yin Thway Nge"
Episode 1 (Friday, November 15, 2019)	2	B	Zawgyi	"Thabawa Yae Yin Thway Nge"
Episode 1 (Friday, November 15, 2019)	2	B	Owl	"Thabawa Yae Yin Thway Nge"
Episode 1 (Friday, November 15, 2019)	3	C	Phoe Wa	"Chit Tar Ta Khu Pae Thi Tal"
Episode 1 (Friday, November 15, 2019)	3	C	Pineapple	"Chit Tar Ta Khu Pae Thi Tal"
Episode 1 (Friday, November 15, 2019)	3	C	Yaksha	"Chit Tar Ta Khu Pae Thi Tal"

=== Week 2: Group A 1st round (November.22) ===
Date	Order	Group	Stage Name	Song	Identity	Result	Unmasked song
Episode 2 (Friday, November 22, 2019)	1	A	Dragon	"Gal Bae Gal Bae"	undisclosed	SAFE	—N/a
Episode 2 (Friday, November 22, 2019)	2	A	Tiger	"Ko Saunt Nat"	Paing Takhon	OUT	"Be My Meow"
Episode 2 (Friday, November 22, 2019)	3	A	Alien	"Kyin Yar Bat"	undisclosed	SAFE	—N/a

=== Week 3: Group B 1st round (November.29) ===
Date	Order	Group	Stage Name	Song	Identity	Result	Unmasked song
Episode 3 (Friday, November 29, 2019)	1	B	Owl	"Kyun Ma"	Han Thi	OUT	"Phone Lay Kaing Oo Kwal"
Episode 3 (Friday, November 29, 2019)	2	B	Zawgyi	"Htawara Kha Yee The"	undisclosed	SAFE	—N/a
Episode 3 (Friday, November 29, 2019)	3	B	Banana	"Nee Chin Way Chin Pitnyat Myar"	undisclosed	SAFE	—N/a

=== Week 4: Group C 1st round (December.6) ===
Date	Order	Group	Stage Name	Song	Identity	Result	Unmasked song
Episode 4 (Friday, December 6, 2019)	1	C	Phoe Wa	"A Thel Kwae Myo Taw"	undisclosed	SAFE	—N/a
Episode 4 (Friday, December 6, 2019)	2	C	Pineapple	"Medicine"	undisclosed	SAFE	—N/a
Episode 4 (Friday, December 6, 2019)	3	C	Yaksha	"Nya Mhwe Pann"	Kyaw Htoo	OUT	"Chit Chit"

=== Week 5: Group A, B, C knockout round day 1 (December.13) ===
Date	Order	Group	Stage Name	Battle song 1	Battle song 2	Identity	Result	Unmasked song
Episode 5 (Friday, December 13, 2019)	1	A	Dragon	"Ma Lwan Ye Thay Buu Maung Yal"	"Bal Laut Hti Chit Lal"	undisclosed	WIN	—N/a
Episode 5 (Friday, December 13, 2019)	2	B	Banana	"Ma Lwan Ye Thay Buu Maung Yal"	"Sate Kuu Lay Par Pae"	Po Po Heather	OUT	"Nar"
Episode 5 (Friday, December 13, 2019)	3	C	Phoe Wa	"Bal Laut Hti Chit Lal"	"Sate Kuu Lay Par Pae"	Aung Ye Htike	OUT	"Saunt"

=== Week 6: Group A, B, C knockout round day 2 (December.20) ===
Date	Order	Group	Stage Name	Battle song 1	Battle song 2	Identity	Result	Unmasked song
Episode 6 (Friday, December 20, 2019)	1	A	Alien	"A Chit Har Mee Lar"	"Kabar Kyaw Sate Kuu"	Oak Soe Khant	OUT	"Chit Nay Pyi"
Episode 6 (Friday, December 20, 2019)	2	B	Zawgyi	"A Chit Har Mee Lar"	"Message"	Wai Gyi	OUT	"Line Paw Ma Tin Par Nae"
Episode 6 (Friday, December 20, 2019)	3	C	Pineapple	"Kabar Kyaw Sate Kuu"	"Message"	undisclosed	WIN	—N/a

=== Week 7: Group A, B, C Final round (December.27) ===
Date	Order	Group	Stage Name	Song	Battle Song	Identity	Result	Unmasked song
Episode 7 (Friday, December 27, 2019)	1	A	Dragon	"Ah Shone Htet Po Thaw"	"Mhan Nay Tae A Mhar"	Athin Cho Swe	OUT	"Never Give Up"
Episode 7 (Friday, December 27, 2019)	2	C	Pineapple	"Na Maw Na Mae"	"Mhan Nay Tae A Mhar"	undisclosed	WIN	—N/a

== Group D, E, F ==
=== Week 8: Group D, E, F introducing (January.3) ===
Date	Order	Group	Stage Name	Song
Episode 8 (Friday, January 3, 2020)	1	D	Peacock	"Chit Thaw Kabar Myay"
Episode 8 (Friday, January 3, 2020)	1	D	Watermelon	"Chit Thaw Kabar Myay"
Episode 8 (Friday, January 3, 2020)	1	D	Anubis	"Chit Thaw Kabar Myay"
Episode 8 (Friday, January 3, 2020)	2	E	Cat	"A Phyu Nae A Mae"
Episode 8 (Friday, January 3, 2020)	2	E	Puppet	"A Phyu Nae A Mae"
Episode 8 (Friday, January 3, 2020)	2	E	Piggy	"A Phyu Nae A Mae"
Episode 8 (Friday, January 3, 2020)	3	F	Crow	"Ma Yoe Thar Taw Buu"
Episode 8 (Friday, January 3, 2020)	3	F	Ice Cream	"Ma Yoe Thar Taw Buu"
Episode 8 (Friday, January 3, 2020)	3	F	Pirate	"Ma Yoe Thar Taw Buu"

=== Week 9: Group D 1st round (January.10) ===
Date	Order	Group	Stage Name	Song	Identity	Result	Unmasked song
Episode 9 (Friday, January 10, 2020)	1	D	Anubis	"Say Soe Pann Yite Myet Nar"	Min Maw Kun	OUT	"Yee Sar Sakar"
Episode 9 (Friday, January 10, 2020)	2	D	Watermelon	"Good Kisser"	undisclosed	SAFE	—N/a
Episode 9 (Friday, January 10, 2020)	3	D	Peacock	"Makeup Ma Kyite Thaw Tha Chin Myar"	undisclosed	SAFE	—N/a

=== Week 10: Group E 1st round (January.17) ===
Date	Order	Group	Stage Name	Song	Identity	Result	Unmasked song
Episode 10 (Friday, January 17, 2020)	1	E	Piggy	"Min Kyaunt"	undisclosed	SAFE	—N/a
Episode 10 (Friday, January 17, 2020)	2	E	Cat	"A Thel Hna Lone Ma Shi Tae Lu"	Ma Htet	OUT	"Nga Yee Sar Ka Thu Yee Sar Phyit Nay Tal"
Episode 10 (Friday, January 17, 2020)	3	E	Puppet	"Pae Kaing Shin"	undisclosed	SAFE	—N/a

=== Week 11: Group F 1st round (January.24) ===
Date	Order	Group	Stage Name	Song	Identity	Result	Unmasked song
Episode 11 (Friday, January 24, 2020)	1	F	Ice Cream	"Pha Yar Sue"	undisclosed	SAFE	—N/a
Episode 11 (Friday, January 24, 2020)	2	F	Pirate	"A Chit Tay Kabyar"	undisclosed	SAFE	—N/a
Episode 11 (Friday, January 24, 2020)	3	F	Crow	"3 AM"	Aung Myint Myat	OUT	"A Chit Oo Pone Pyin"

=== Week 12: Group D, E, F knockout round day 1 (January.31) ===
Date	Order	Group	Stage Name	Battle song 1	Battle song 2	Identity	Result	Unmasked song
Episode 12 (Friday, January 31, 2020)	1	E	Piggy	"Chit Tae Sate So Dar"	"Strawberry Chit Thel Shin"	Nay Nay	OUT	"A Khite A Tant Phuu Sar"
Episode 12 (Friday, January 31, 2020)	2	F	Ice Cream	"Chit Tae Sate So Dar"	"Lwal Lwal Nae May Lo Ma Ya Tae A Chit"	Nang Khin Zay Yar	OUT	"You're My Puppy"
Episode 12 (Friday, January 31, 2020)	3	D	Peacock	"Lwal Lwal Nae May Lo Ma Ya Tae A Chit"	"Strawberry Chit Thel Shin"	undisclosed	WIN	—N/a

=== Week 13: Group D, E, F knockout round day 2 (February.7) ===
Date	Order	Group	Stage Name	Battle song 1	Battle song 2	Identity	Result	Unmasked song
Episode 13 (Friday, February 7, 2020)	1	D	Watermelon	"Tar Won A Ya"	"A Chit Eain"	Kay Kay Moe	OUT	"Thu"
Episode 13 (Friday, February 7, 2020)	2	E	Puppet	"Tar Won A Ya"	"Thu Nge Tan"	Eisi Kway	OUT	"Sett Yan Ma Shi"
Episode 13 (Friday, February 7, 2020)	3	F	Pirate	"Thu Nge Tan"	"A Chit Eain"	undisclosed	WIN	—N/a

=== Week 14: Group D, E, F Final round (February.14) ===
Date	Order	Group	Stage Name	Song	Battle Song	Identity	Result	Unmasked song
Episode 14 (Friday, February 14, 2020)	1	D	Peacock	"Amattaya Valentine"	"Tho Mae Tway A Kyaung"	undisclosed	WIN	—N/a
Episode 14 (Friday, February 14, 2020)	2	F	Pirate	"Happy Valentine's Day"	"Tho Mae Tway A Kyaung"	He Lay	OUT	"Samosa"

== Grand Final & Champion Celebration ==
=== Week 15: Grand Final (February.21) ===
Date	Order	Group	Stage Name	Song	Battle Song	Identity	Result	Unmasked song
Episode 15 (Friday, February 21, 2020)	1	C	Pineapple	"Thitsar Ma Pyet Kyay"	"Min Nae Chit Tar"	Lain Maw Thee	RUNNER-UP	"A Thet Shin Mae Thu"
Episode 15 (Friday, February 21, 2020)	2	D	Peacock	"Nayee Minute Second Ma Lit"	"Min Nae Chit Tar"	undisclosed	WINNER	—N/a

=== Week 16: Champion Celebration (February.28) ===
Date	Order	Stage Name	Identity	Song	Note
Episode 16 (Friday, February 28, 2020)	1	Peacock	undisclosed	"Kha Yee Myar A Sone Hti Shauk"	—N/a
Episode 16 (Friday, February 28, 2020)	2	Zawgyi, Watermelon	Wai Gyi, Kay Kay Moe	"Lay Ko San Pyan So Lar"	Guest performers
Episode 16 (Friday, February 28, 2020)	3	Peacock	undisclosed	"Inya Tho", "Thu Sain Tha Yauk", "A Chain Lun Nget"	—N/a
Episode 16 (Friday, February 28, 2020)	4	Peacock	Sin Pauk	"Pya Zat Ma Hote Thaw Pya Zat" (Unmasked song)	—N/a
