= Kyar Kyar Kyite Kyite =

2019 Brumese comedy film

- Film poster
- Burmese: ကျားကျားကြိုက်ကြိုက်
- Directed by: Pyi Hein Thiha
- Written by: Pyi Hein Thiha; Di Di Htet Aung
- Starring: Min Maw Kun; Myint Myat; Khin San Win; Nyi Nyi Maung; Lin Linn; Ma Htet
- Production companies: Half & Half Film Production
- Release date: August 29, 2019
- Running time: 120 minutes
- Country: Myanmar
- Language: Burmese

Kyar Kyar Kyite Kyite (Burmese: ကျားကျားကြိုက်ကြိုက်), is a 2019 Burmese comedy film starring Myint Myat, Min Maw Kun, Khin San Win, Nyi Nyi Maung, Lin Linn and Ma Htet. The film, produced by Half & Half Film Production, premiered in Myanmar on August 29, 2019.

== Cast ==
- Myint Myat as Chit Loon Thu
- Min Maw Kun as Kyaw Gyi
- Ma Htet as Zar Zar
- Khin San Win
- Nyi Nyi Maung
- Lin Linn
