= Yone Lay =

Burmese entertainer and director (born 1985)

- ယုန်လေး
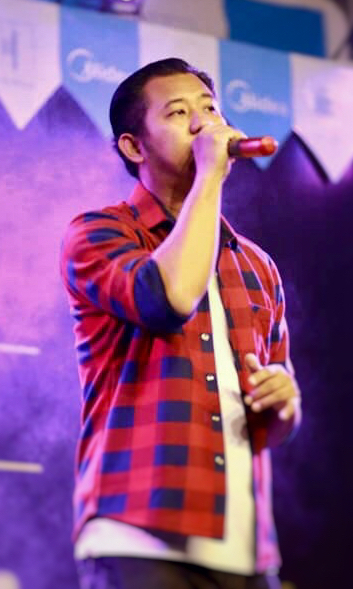
- Yone Lay in 2019
- Born: Aung Phone Kyaw; 23 September 1985 (age 40); Rangoon, Burma
- Education: University of Yangon
- Occupations: Singer-songwriter, actor, director
- Musical career
- Genres: Rap, hip hop
- Instruments: Vocals
- Years active: 2001–present

Yone Lay (Burmese: ယုန်လေး; lit. 'little rabbit', born Aung Phone Kyaw on 23 September 1985) is a Burmese singer, actor and director. He has achieved fame as a singer and actor. In August 2020, he was highly criticized after releasing a music video depicting the assassination of Myanmar's de facto leader and State Counsellor Aung San Suu Kyi.

== Early life ==
Yone Lay was born on 23 September 1985 in Yangon, Myanmar, to father Swe Tint and his wife Khin Saw Mu, a former teacher.

== Career ==
Yone Lay began his music career in 2001 as a singer in the underground music industry and sang his own songs. In 2005, he joined a native underground hip hop crew, TARGET, and released a number of songs and mix-tapes, collaborating with TARGET's members. He participated in the group albums Min A Twat 1 (For You 1) in 2005 and Min A Twat 2 (For You 2) in 2006. One of the songs from the Min A Twat 2 album, "A Chit A Twat Kan Ma Kaung Khae Thu", a duet with L Seng Zi which gained him nationwide recognition, has been one of the all-time hits in his career. In 2008, he released a solo album, Like Khae Top. His second solo album, Eain Ma Paing Yin Gawli Ma Lok Nae, was released in 2010 and produced some huge hits. Many music industry records have followed since then.

== Controversy ==
On 4 August 2020, Yone Lay released a music video titled "The Land of Ours (Time to Unite Myanmar)" which lasted over 13 minutes. It was first posted on the Facebook pages Taythanthar and Original Gangster. Within a few minutes, people from across the country – including singers, actors and politicians – were criticizing the video because it depicted the assassination of Myanmar's State Counsellor, Aung San Suu Kyi. Near the end of video, army officers are seen bursting into a meeting to assassinate Aung San Suu Kyi, until Senior General Min Aung Hlaing comes to the rescue.

The video was directed and produced by Yone Lay. Famous singers like Htoo El Lynn, Chan Chan, Moe Moe, Poe Mi, Yarwana and over 20 others contributed to the song. Chan Chan explained that they did not know that their work and contributions will be used in such a way. Yone Lay was criticised for aligning himself with the military-backed Union Solidarity and Development Party, with suggestions that the video was even funded by the former government.

Aye Kywe, acting director-general of the Information and Public Relations Department, said the Ministry of Information would investigate to see whether production of the video violated the regulations of the ministry or the Myanmar Motion Picture Organization, as well as the COVID-19 guidelines issued by the Ministry of Health and Sports.

For his video creation, Myanmar Motion Picture Organization ordered Yone Lay to pause artistic movements for one year in August 2020.

=== Incident ===
On 30 December 2023, two explosions occurred near Yone Lay's residence on Pyar Pon Road in Sanchaung Township, Yangon, Myanmar. According to local residents and resistance-linked sources, the blasts were heard across the area, prompting increased security checks. While no group has claimed responsibility, reports suggest that Yone Lay had been living at the residence at the time of the incident. The singer is known for his pro-military stance and involvement in supporting detained artists by facilitating negotiations with authorities.

== Filmography ==
- Ko Tha Mine Ko Yay Kya Thu Myar (2012)
- Lu Gyan Ta Yout Yae Diary (2018)
- Original Gangster 2 (2017)
- Special 9 (2018)
- Beware, It's Dangerous (2019)
- Ko Tha Mine Ko Yay Kya Thu Myar 2 (2019)
- Underground (2019) featuring Dave Leduc

== Discography ==
=== Solo albums ===
- Like Khae Top (2008)
- Eain Ma Paing Yin Gawli Ma Lok Nae (2010)

=== Group albums ===
- Min A Twat 1 (2005)
- Min A Twat 2 (2006)
