= May La Than Zin =

Burmese singer

- Born: 23 May 2003 (age 22); Pyin Oo Lwin, Myanmar
- Genres: Pop
- Occupation: Singer
- Instruments: Vocals; guitar
- Years active: 2012–present

May La Than Zin (Burmese: မေလသံစဉ်, MLCTS: me la san. cany, also known as May Melody; born 23 May 2003) is a Burmese singer best known for her acoustic cover songs.

== Early life ==
May La Than Zin was born on May 23, 2003, in Pyin Oo Lwin, Mandalay Region, Myanmar.

== Career ==
She began receiving musical training in the 3rd grade, learning the keyboard, guitar, and singing in the process. At the age of nine, Than Zin was featured in the musical albums of singers like Athin Cho Swe and So Tay. At the age of 12, she was composing her own music, and was regarded as a local "music prodigy." On 10 August 2015, Than Zin self-wrote and published a song entitled "Myanmar Heroes" (မြန်မာ့သူရဲကောင်း), which received 600,000 views by 19 August.

In July 2020, she released a cover album, entitled Renewing the Vintage Era (ပြန်လည်ဆန်းသစ် နှောင်းတစ်ခေတ်), which features duets with other pop singers like Oak Soe Khant, Zwe Pyae, and Phyo Pyae Sone.

== Discography ==
=== Albums ===
- Renewing the Vintage Era (ပြန်လည်ဆန်းသစ် နှောင်းတစ်ခေတ်) (2020)

== Awards ==
- 2020 - Yangon City FM Award for Best Female Vocalist
