= The Mask Singer Myanmar season 3 =

Season of The Mask Singer Myanmar

The Mask Singer Myanmar
- Season 3
- poster
- Starring: Khine Thin Kyi; Sandy Myint Lwin; Htun Htun; Phyo Ngwe Soe
- Hosted by: Paing Zay Ye Htun
- Winner: Phyo Kyaw Htike as "Cassette Rockstar"
- Runner-up: Khin Poe Panchi as "Strawberry"
- No. of episodes: 20

Release
- Original network: Channel 9
- Original release: 6 March – 24 July 2026

Season chronology
- ← Previous; Season 2

The third season of The Mask Singer Myanmar premiered on 6 March 2026, and lasted for 20 episodes. On 24 July 2026, the Cassette Rockstar (singer Phyo Kyaw Htike) was declared the winner, and the Strawberry (singer Khin Poe Panchi) the runner-up.

== Contestants ==
Stage name	Celebrity	Occupation	Episodes																		
Stage name	Celebrity	Occupation	1	2	3	4	5	6	7	8	9	10	11	12	13	14	15	16	17	18	19
Stage name	Celebrity	Occupation	Group A, B, C									Group D, E, F									19
Cassette Rockstar	Phyo Kyaw Htike	Singer										SAFE	SAFE				SAFE		WIN	WIN	WINNER
Strawberry (စတော်ဘယ်ရီ)	Khin Poe Panchi	Singer	SAFE			SAFE	SAFE		WIN		WIN										RUNNER-UP
Lady Cow	Poe Mi	Singer										SAFE		SAFE		SAFE		WIN		OUT	
Parrot (ရွှေဂဲ)	Nyein Thaw	Actor										SAFE			SAFE		SAFE		OUT		
Pyit Taing Htaung (ပစ်တိုင်းထောင်)	Thar Nge	Singer										SAFE			SAFE	SAFE		OUT			
Custard Apple (မောင်ဩဇာ)	Do Pauk	Comedian										SAFE		SAFE			OUT				
Dragonfly (မယ်ပုစဉ်း)	Thet Htar Thuzar	Badminton player										SAFE	SAFE			OUT					
Chrysanthemum (ဂန္ဓမာပန်း)	Chaw Yadanar	Actress										SAFE			OUT						
King Fox	Vita Min	Actor										SAFE		OUT							
Chili Girl	May Kabyar	Actress										SAFE	OUT								
Mirror Man (ကြေးမုံလူသား)	Nyi Min Khaing	Singer	SAFE	SAFE				SAFE		WIN	OUT										
Pot Drum (အိုးစည်)	Ye Lay	Singer	SAFE		SAFE			SAFE		OUT											
Cupid (မြားနတ်မောင်)	Heavy Phyo	Actor	SAFE	SAFE			SAFE		OUT												
Cherry Blossom (ချယ်ရီပန်း)	Nann Myat Phyo Thinn	Singer	SAFE			SAFE		OUT													
Golden Deer (ရွှေသမင်)	Aye Myat Thu	Actress	SAFE		SAFE		OUT														
Panda (ပန်ဒါ)	Lwin Moe	Actor	SAFE			OUT															
Sticky Rice Wrap (ကောက်ညှင်းထုပ်)	Zwe Pyae	Singer	SAFE		OUT																
Princess Bunny	San Htake Htar Oo	Actress	SAFE	OUT																	

== Group A, B, C ==
=== Week 1: Group A, B, C introducing (March.6) ===
Non-competition performance
Order	Performer	Song
1	Rebecca Win, Sandy Myint Lwin	"Champion Candidate"

Date	Order	Group	Stage Name	Song
Episode 1 (Friday, March 6, 2026)	1	A	Mirror Man	"Thu Nge Chin"
Episode 1 (Friday, March 6, 2026)	1	A	Cupid	"Thu Nge Chin"
Episode 1 (Friday, March 6, 2026)	1	A	Princess Bunny	"Thu Nge Chin"
Episode 1 (Friday, March 6, 2026)	2	B	Pot Drum	"Kan Kaung Chin Let Saung"
Episode 1 (Friday, March 6, 2026)	2	B	Golden Deer	"Kan Kaung Chin Let Saung"
Episode 1 (Friday, March 6, 2026)	2	B	Sticky Rice Wrap	"Kan Kaung Chin Let Saung"
Episode 1 (Friday, March 6, 2026)	3	C	Cherry Blossom	"U Ba Nyunt Yae Chit Doke Kha"
Episode 1 (Friday, March 6, 2026)	3	C	Panda	"U Ba Nyunt Yae Chit Doke Kha"
Episode 1 (Friday, March 6, 2026)	3	C	Strawberry	"U Ba Nyunt Yae Chit Doke Kha"

=== Week 2: Group A 1st round (March.13) ===
Date	Order	Group	Stage Name	Song	Identity	Result	Unmasked song
Episode 2 (Friday, March 13, 2026)	1	A	Mirror Man	"Min Ta Yauk Thar"	undisclosed	SAFE	—N/a
Episode 2 (Friday, March 13, 2026)	2	A	Cupid	"Mee Chit"	undisclosed	SAFE	—N/a
Episode 2 (Friday, March 13, 2026)	3	A	Princess Bunny	"Saing Thu Ma Thi Tae A Chit"	San Htate Htar Oo	OUT	"Everytime"

=== Week 3: Group B 1st round (March.20) ===
Date	Order	Group	Stage Name	Song	Identity	Result	Unmasked song
Episode 3 (Friday, March 20, 2026)	1	B	Pot Drum	"Myet Nar"	undisclosed	SAFE	—N/a
Episode 3 (Friday, March 20, 2026)	2	B	Golden Deer	"Sin Sar Mhar Poh"	undisclosed	SAFE	—N/a
Episode 3 (Friday, March 20, 2026)	3	B	Sticky Rice Wrap	"Pann Ma Khuu Ya"	Zwe Pyae	OUT	"Thu"

Non-competition performance
Order	Stage Name	Song	Identity
1	Proma	"A Chit Kyaunt"	undisclosed

=== Week 4: Group C 1st round (March.27) ===
Date	Order	Group	Stage Name	Song	Identity	Result	Unmasked song
Episode 4 (Friday, March 27, 2026)	1	C	Cherry Blossom	"Taw Yar"	undisclosed	SAFE	—N/a
Episode 4 (Friday, March 27, 2026)	2	C	Panda	"Kyo Mae Chi Taing"	Lwin Moe	OUT	"Kwint Lwut Par Say"
Episode 4 (Friday, March 27, 2026)	3	C	Strawberry	"Met Lauk Sa Yar"	undisclosed	SAFE	—N/a

Non-competition performance
Order	Stage Name	Song	Identity
1	Proma	"A Chit Daw Tha Mee"	undisclosed

=== Week 5: Group A, B, C 2nd round day 1 (April.3) ===
Date	Order	Group	Stage Name	Song	Identity	Result	Unmasked song
Episode 5 (Friday, April 3, 2026)	1	A	Cupid	"Myo Pya Nae Kyun Taw"	undisclosed	SAFE	—N/a
Episode 5 (Friday, April 3, 2026)	2	B	Golden Deer	"Guitar Asa Bal Thu Ka"	Aye Myat Thu	OUT	"Miss Universe"
Episode 5 (Friday, April 3, 2026)	3	C	Strawberry	"Cho Myain Dotkha"	undisclosed	SAFE	—N/a

=== Week 6: Group A, B, C 2nd round day 2 (April.10) ===
Date	Order	Group	Stage Name	Song	Identity	Result	Unmasked song
Episode 6 (Friday, April 10, 2026)	1	A	Mirror Man	"Shwe La Thar Mha"	undisclosed	SAFE	—N/a
Episode 6 (Friday, April 10, 2026)	2	B	Pot Drum	"Ma Ma Chit Lo Ma Phyit"	undisclosed	SAFE	—N/a
Episode 6 (Friday, April 10, 2026)	3	C	Cherry Blossom	"Shin Naw"	Nann Myat Phyo Thinn	OUT	"Nga Ko Chit Yin"

=== Week 7: Group A, B, C 3rd round day 1 (April.24) ===
Date	Order	Group	Stage Name	Song	Battle Song	Identity	Result	Unmasked song
Episode 7 (Friday, April 24, 2026)	1	A	Cupid	"Thu Ma A Twat"	"Ar Yone Khan Hna Lone Thar"	Heavy Phyo	OUT	"Muu Nay Tae A Thel"
Episode 7 (Friday, April 24, 2026)	2	C	Strawberry	"Sate Kuu"	"Ar Yone Khan Hna Lone Thar"	undisclosed	WIN	—N/a

=== Week 8: Group A, B, C 3rd round day 2 (May.1) ===
Date	Order	Group	Stage Name	Song	Battle Song	Identity	Result	Unmasked song
Episode 8 (Friday, May 1, 2026)	1	A	Mirror Man	"Min Ma Thi Buu Lar"	"Yoke Shin Tha Chin"	undisclosed	WIN	—N/a
Episode 8 (Friday, May 1, 2026)	2	B	Pot Drum	"Chit Thu Yae Pone Pyin"	"Yoke Shin Tha Chin"	Ye Lay	OUT	"Kaung Ka Lay Ka Kaung Ma Lay Ko"

=== Week 9: Semi-final or Group A, B, C Final round (May.8) ===
Date	Order	Group	Stage Name	Song	Battle Song	Identity	Result	Unmasked song
Episode 9 (Friday, May 8, 2026)	1	A	Mirror Man	"Mone Maye Pho Khet Tal"	"Yee Sar Oo Zat Lenn"	Nyi Min Khaing	OUT	"Kyo Pyaw"
Episode 9 (Friday, May 8, 2026)	2	C	Strawberry	"Kyin Nar Chin Loon Loh"	"Yee Sar Oo Zat Lenn"	undisclosed	WIN	—N/a

== Group D, E, F ==
=== Week 10: Group D, E, F introducing (May.15) ===
Date	Order	Group	Stage Name	Song
Episode 10 (Friday, May 15, 2026)	1	D	Dragonfly	"Nar Yee Yae Tha Chin"
Episode 10 (Friday, May 15, 2026)	1	D	Cassette Rockstar	"Nar Yee Yae Tha Chin"
Episode 10 (Friday, May 15, 2026)	1	D	Chili Girl	"Nar Yee Yae Tha Chin"
Episode 10 (Friday, May 15, 2026)	2	E	King Fox	"Chit Chin Ta Yar"
Episode 10 (Friday, May 15, 2026)	2	E	Lady Cow	"Chit Chin Ta Yar"
Episode 10 (Friday, May 15, 2026)	2	E	Custard Apple	"Chit Chin Ta Yar"
Episode 10 (Friday, May 15, 2026)	3	F	Parrot	"Ta Naye Taw Yauk Mal Kwal"
Episode 10 (Friday, May 15, 2026)	3	F	Chrysanthemum	"Ta Naye Taw Yauk Mal Kwal"
Episode 10 (Friday, May 15, 2026)	3	F	Pyit Taing Htaung	"Ta Naye Taw Yauk Mal Kwal"

=== Week 11: Group D 1st round (May.22) ===
Date	Order	Group	Stage Name	Song	Identity	Result	Unmasked song
Episode 11 (Friday, May 22, 2026)	1	D	Dragonfly	"Ko Ma Nyar Taw Buu"	undisclosed	SAFE	—N/a
Episode 11 (Friday, May 22, 2026)	2	D	Cassette Rockstar	"A Chit"	undisclosed	SAFE	—N/a
Episode 11 (Friday, May 22, 2026)	3	D	Chili Girl	"Sone Phyat"	May Kabyar	OUT	"A Chit Ko Thi Chain"

=== Week 12: Group E 1st round (May.29) ===
Date	Order	Group	Stage Name	Song	Identity	Result	Unmasked song
Episode 12 (Friday, May 29, 2026)	1	E	Lady Cow	"Yin Lwae Sakar"	undisclosed	SAFE	—N/a
Episode 12 (Friday, May 29, 2026)	2	E	King Fox	"Pazon Sate Kalay"	Vita Min	OUT	"Tain"
Episode 12 (Friday, May 29, 2026)	3	E	Custard Apple	"Hote Lae Ma Hote Pae Nae"	undisclosed	SAFE	—N/a

=== Week 13: Group F 1st round (June.5) ===
Date	Order	Group	Stage Name	Song	Identity	Result	Unmasked song
Episode 13 (Friday, June 5, 2026)	1	F	Pyit Taing Htaung	"Mya Khwar Nyo"	undisclosed	SAFE	—N/a
Episode 13 (Friday, June 5, 2026)	2	F	Chrysanthemum	"Yone Lite Taw Mal"	Chaw Yadanar	OUT	"Lo Ta Ya"
Episode 13 (Friday, June 5, 2026)	3	F	Parrot	"Maung Chit Thu"	undisclosed	SAFE	—N/a

=== Week 14: Group D, E, F 2nd round day 1 (June.12) ===
Date	Order	Group	Stage Name	Song	Identity	Result	Unmasked song
Episode 14 (Friday, June 12, 2026)	1	D	Dragonfly	"Arr Nar Lite Tar A Chit Yal"	Thet Htar Thuzar	OUT	"Maung Nauk Lite Khae Mal"
Episode 14 (Friday, June 12, 2026)	2	E	Lady Cow	"Gabar"	undisclosed	SAFE	—N/a
Episode 14 (Friday, June 12, 2026)	3	F	Pyit Taing Htaung	"Kyite Thwar Pyi"	undisclosed	SAFE	—N/a

=== Week 15: Group D, E, F 2nd round day 2 (June.19) ===
Date	Order	Group	Stage Name	Song	Identity	Result	Unmasked song
Episode 15 (Friday, June 19, 2026)	1	D	Cassette Rockstar	"Kyal Kyway Nya Taing Su Taung Mal"	undisclosed	SAFE	—N/a
Episode 15 (Friday, June 19, 2026)	2	E	Custard Apple	"Di A Chain Mhar Pyan Twaye Tar Bar Lote Ya Mhar Lae"	Do Pauk	OUT	"Pyo Taing Kyite Tae Hnin Si Khaing"
Episode 15 (Friday, June 19, 2026)	3	F	Parrot	"Kyun Taw Chit Tae Thu Mhar Chit Thu Shi Tal"	undisclosed	SAFE	—N/a

=== Week 16: Group D, E, F 3rd round day 1 (June.26) ===
Date	Order	Group	Stage Name	Song	Battle Song	Identity	Result	Unmasked song
Episode 16 (Friday, June 26, 2026)	1	E	Lady Cow	"A Thel Kwal A Htain A Mat"	"Myaw Lwint Nay Tae Tain"	undisclosed	WIN	—N/a
Episode 16 (Friday, June 26, 2026)	2	F	Pyit Taing Htaung	"Eainmet Kabyar"	"Myaw Lwint Nay Tae Tain"	Thar Nge	OUT	"Dar Eainmet Pae"

=== Week 17: Group D, E, F 3rd round day 2 (July.3) ===
Date	Order	Group	Stage Name	Song	Battle Song	Identity	Result	Unmasked song
Episode 17 (Friday, July 3, 2026)	1	D	Cassette Rockstar	"A Chwae Ma Lay"	"Ahtta Thamar Kyun Taw"	undisclosed	WIN	—N/a
Episode 17 (Friday, July 3, 2026)	2	F	Parrot	"Ta Yauk Htae Lar"	"Ahtta Thamar Kyun Taw"	Nyein Thaw	OUT	"Maung Khaw Yar Lite Mhar Lar"

=== Week 18: Semi-final or Group D, E, F Final round (July.10) ===
Date	Order	Group	Stage Name	Song	Battle Song	Identity	Result	Unmasked song
Episode 18 (Friday, July 10, 2026)	1	D	Cassette Rockstar	"Nay Par Say Chit Lo"	"A Chit Nae Kyun Taw Yae Pya Zat"	undisclosed	WIN	—N/a
Episode 18 (Friday, July 10, 2026)	2	E	Lady Cow	"Moe Kalay Ywar Nay Yin"	"A Chit Nae Kyun Taw Yae Pya Zat"	Poe Mi	OUT	"Moe Pyay"

== Grand Final & Champion Celebration ==
=== Week 19: Grand Final (July.17) ===
Date	Order	Group	Stage Name	Song	Identity	Result	Unmasked song
Episode 19 (Friday, July 17, 2026)	1	C	Strawberry	"Zay Ban"	Khin Poe Panchi	RUNNER-UP	"Hna Lone Thar Ko A Hla Sin Par"
Episode 19 (Friday, July 17, 2026)	2	D	Cassette Rockstar	"A Thel Kwal Tae Yaw Gar"	undisclosed	WINNER	—N/a

=== Week 20: Champion Celebration (July.24) ===
Date	Order	Stage Name	Identity	Song	Note
Episode 20 (Friday, July 24, 2026)	1	Cassette Rockstar	undisclosed	"Min Nar Lal Mhar Par"	—N/a
Episode 20 (Friday, July 24, 2026)	2	—N/a	Ye Lay	"Eain Pyan Chain"	Guest performer
Episode 20 (Friday, July 24, 2026)	3	Cassette Rockstar	undisclosed	"Thitsar Ma Shi Tae Thit Sar", "Pyat Tone Lat Tone 23", "Judy"	—N/a
Episode 20 (Friday, July 24, 2026)	4	—N/a	Vita Min	"Don't Leave Me Bae"	Guest performer
Episode 20 (Friday, July 24, 2026)	5	Cassette Rockstar	Phyo Kyaw Htike	"Mhay Set Yin Khwin" (Unmasked song)	—N/a
