= Kay Kay Moe =

Burmese singer

Kay Kay Moe ကေကေမိုး
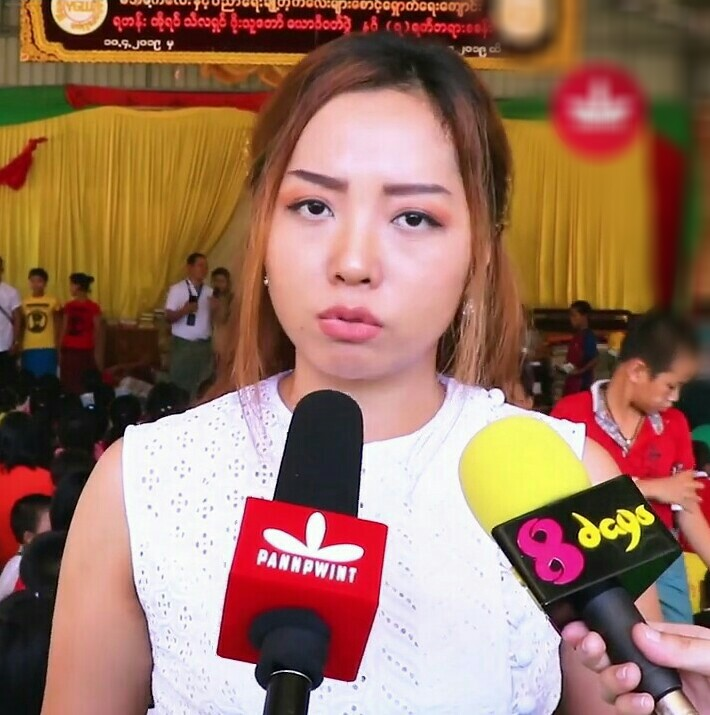
- Kay Kay Moe in 2019

Background information
- Born: 9 September 1991 (age 33); Yangon, Myanmar
- Genres: Pop
- Occupation: Singer
- Instruments: Vocals; guitar
- Years active: 2010–present

Kay Kay Moe (Burmese: ကေကေမိုး; born 9 September 1991) is a Burmese singer. She became popular after releasing her single song Kyun Ma (ကျွန်မ) from her album Kyun Ma. She won Female Singer Award of Most Requested Song from Shwe FM Facebook Page for 2018 in Shwe FM 9th Anniversary for this song Kyun Ma. She also won the Most Popular New Female Singer Award at the 19th annual Yangon City FM Awards in 2018 for the same song.

== Early life and education ==
Kay Kay Moe was born on 9 September 1991 in Yangon, Myanmar. She is third daughter of four siblings. Her cousin Chaw Su Khin is also a singer. She attended at University of Distance Education, Yangon.

== Career ==
In 2010, she started her career by competing in Music Competition 2010, held by Myanmar Beer. In this competition, she competed against Aung Htet and other contestants. She also competed in Gita Dagar Lay Phwint Par Oo Music Competition and she won golden key.

In 2018, her debut album Kyun Ma was released and her single song Kyun Ma from this album was popular among audiences. On December 15, 2018, she won Female Singer Award of Most Requested Song from Shwe FM Facebook Page for 2018 in Shwe FM 9th Anniversary by this song Kyun Ma. On January 12, 2019, she also won the Most Popular New Female Singer Award for 2018 in City FM 17th Anniversary by the same song. She featured with song Maung Ma Ngo Ya Bu Naw in The Storm That Kissed Me film.

In 2019, she also featured with song Ma Pyaw Pay Mae alongside Oak Soe Khant in the film The Greatest Love. She competed with Watermelon Mask in the first season of The Mask Singer Myanmar, aired on November 15, 2019.

In 2020, her second album Thu was released. On September 11, 2020, she sang the song Ma Sone See Khae Lay Thaw A Chit Myar at the music concert held in celebration of the 100th Anniversary of Burmese Film.

On November 13, 2020, she sang the song Alwan Sakar at the music concert held in celebration of the 100th Anniversary of Yangon University.

== Discography ==
=== Album ===
- Kyun Ma (2018)
- Thu (2020)

== Awards ==
- Female Singer Award of Most Requested Song from Shwe FM Facebook Page for 2018 (Shwe FM 9th Anniversary)
- Most Popular New Female Singer Award for 2018 (City FM 17th Anniversary)
