= Lin Linn =

Transgender Make Up artist

- လင်းလင်း
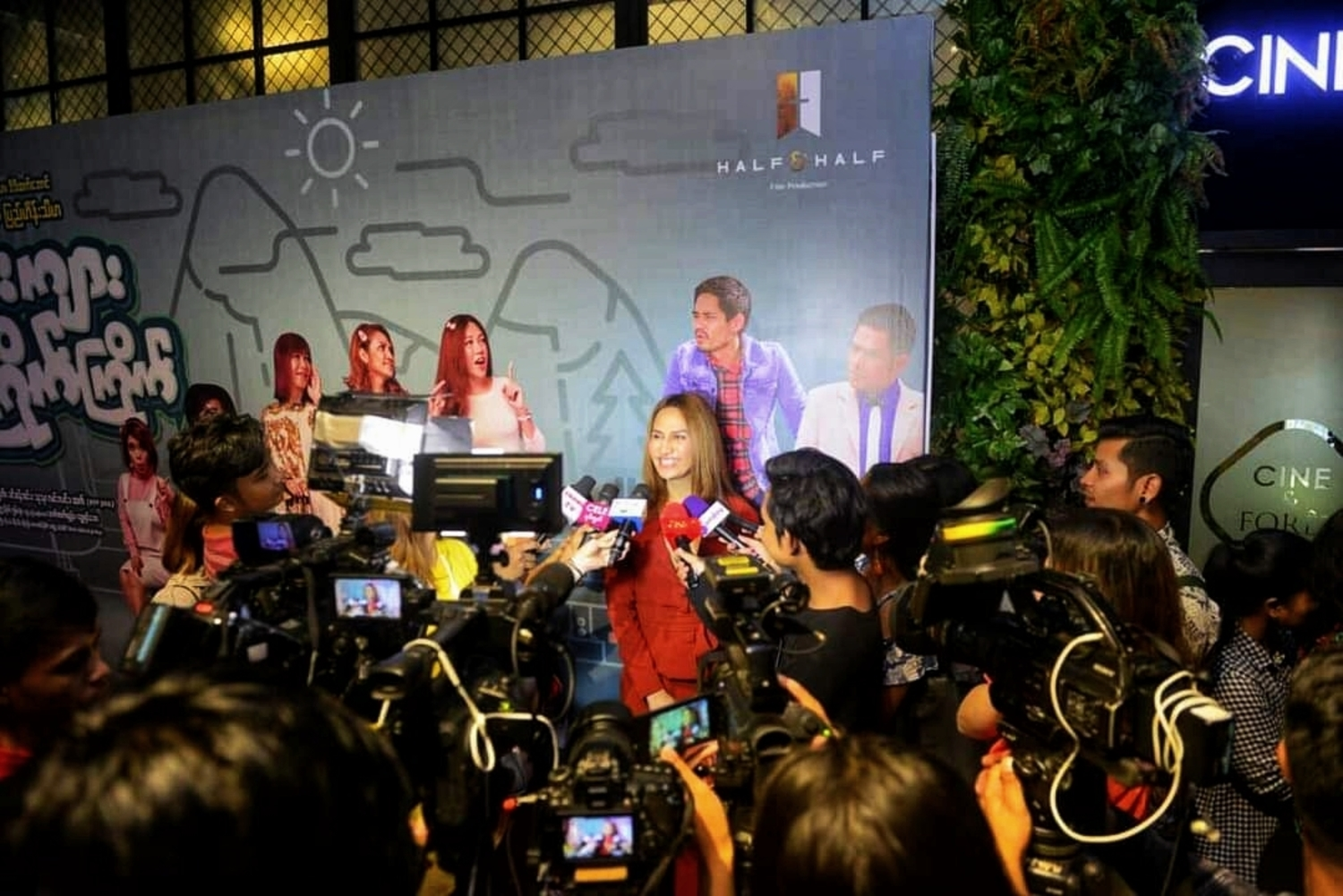
- Lin Linn at her film press show
- Born: Tun Lin; 6 August 1982 (age 43); Yangon, Myanmar
- Education: University of Yangon
- Occupations: Make-up artist, actress
- Years active: 2001–present

Lin Linn (Burmese: လင်းလင်း; also spelled Lin Lin, born Tun Lin on 6 August 1982) is a Burmese make-up artist turned actress after her two decades-long experience in make-up industry. She rose to popularity after working with actress Moe Hay Ko. Lin Linn was listed on The Myanmar Times "Top 10 Make-up artists" list in 2018.

== Early life and education ==
Lin Linn was born on 6 August 1982 in Yangon, Myanmar. She was the only son in the family and favoured a female identity and was constantly misunderstood, discriminated against, and abused, even within the family. She attended high school at Basic Education High School No. 2 Kamayut (St.Augustine) and studied at University of Yangon.

== Career ==
In 2000s, she learned doing make-up from make-up artist Khin San Win. At age 28, she opened a beauty salon in Yangon. She offered to work for popular movie stars and made a name for herself in the make-up industry. She rose to prominence while working with actresses Moe Hay Ko, May Than Nu, Moe Yu San, Thandar Hlaing and others, arranging their hair and changing their looks. In 2017, she studied make-up classes at the Make Up Forever Academy and Make Up Art Academy Paris in France. In the same year, she participated as a judge on Make Me Beautiful by L'Oréal, a reality make-up contest TV show on selected make-up artists in Myanmar. In 2019, she won the Fashion Award at the L'Oréal Myanmar red carpet galas.

Lin Linn was offered an acting role in 2019 and made her big-screen debut with the comedy film Kyar Kyar Kyite Kyite, alongside Myint Myat, Min Maw Kun, Khin San Win, Nyi Nyi Maung and Ma Htet. The film was directed by Pyi Hein Thiha which premiered in Myanmar cinemas on 29 August 2019. Her portrayal of the LGBT character was praised by fans for her acting performance and character interpretation, and experienced a resurgence of popularity. She then starred in her second film A Htein Taw where she played the main role with Myint Myat, Shin Mwe La, Nyi Nyi Maung and Ei Chaw Po.

== Filmography ==
=== Film (Cinema) ===
Year	Title	Director	Co-Stars	Role
2019	Kyar Kyar Kyite Kyite	Pyi Hein Thiha	Myint Myat, Min Maw Kun, Khin San Win, Nyi Nyi Maung, Ma Htet	Main
2020	A Htein Taw	Khin Hlaing	Myint Myat, Shin Mwe La, Nyi Nyi Maung, Ei Chaw Po	Main
