= May Barani Thaw =

Burmese super model, actress and beauty pageant titleholder

- Born: October 19, 1990 (age 35); Yangon, Myanmar
- Height: 168 cm (5 ft 6 in)
- Beauty pageant titleholder
- Title: Miss International Myanmar 2014 (1st Runner-up); Miss Universe Myanmar 2015
- Hair color: Brown
- Eye color: Black
- Major competitions: Miss International Myanmar 2014 (1st Runner-up); Miss International 2014 (Unplaced); Miss Universe Myanmar 2015 (Winner); Miss Universe 2015 (Unplaced)

May Barani Thaw (Burmese: မေဘရဏီသော်; born 19 October 1990) is a Burmese model, actress and beauty pageant titleholder who was crowned Miss Universe Myanmar 2015 and represented Myanmar at the Miss Universe 2015 Pageant.

== Education ==
May Barani Thaw graduated from Dagon University.

== Pageantry ==
=== Miss Universe Myanmar 2015 ===
Thaw previously competed at the Miss International Myanmar 2014 pageant and placed as the 1st Runner-up. The winner of the contest was replaced by Thaw after she withdrew from Miss International 2014 pageant in Tokyo for personal reasons. In 2015, Thaw was crowned Miss Universe Myanmar 2015 on 3 October 2015 in Gandamar Grand Ballroom; 20 contestants competed for the crown and represented Myanmar at the Miss Universe 2015 pageant.

=== Miss Universe 2015 ===
On 20 December 2015, she competed in Miss Universe 2015 but was not able to make it to the semi-finals. She was also a roommate of Miss Universe 2015 Pia Wurtzbach while in Las Vegas.

== Acting career ==
May made her acting debut in the military television film Pyi Daung Zu Thitsar (ပြည်ထောင်စု သစ္စာ), where she played the main role with Wai Lu Kyaw, Kyaw Ye Aung, Nay Dway, Soe Myat Thuzar, May Thet Khine. The film, which was based on the Battle of Mongkoe, was directed by Tin Aung Soe (Pann Myo Taw), aired on Myawaddy TV on 27 March 2017 to commemorate the 72nd Myanmar Armed Forces Day, and theatrically screened on 27 March 2018.

In 2017, she starred the leading role in the television series Two Flower Jousting, alongside Zwe Pyae and Paing Phyo Thu, which was aired on MRTV in March 2018. In 2018, she starred the main role in the television series Beautiful Wives, directed by Aung Aw Ba.

== Filmography ==
=== Film ===
- Pyi Daung Zu Thitsar (ပြည်ထောင်စုသစ္စာ) (television film, 2017)
- The Greatest Love (အခမ်းနားဆုံးမေတ္တာ) (2019)

=== Television series ===
- Battle of 2 Flowers (ပန်းနှစ်ပွင့်စီးချင်း) (2018)
- Beautiful Wives Club (ဇနီးချောများကွန်ရက်) (2018)
- Lu Lu Sein (လူးလူးစိန်) (2020)

Awards and achievements
Preceded by Sharr Htut Eaindra	Miss Universe Myanmar; 2015	Succeeded by Htet Htet Htun
