= Po Po Heather =

Burmese singer

Po Po Heather ပိုပိုဟေသာ
- Born: 8 January 1998 (age 27); Pyin Oo Lwin, Myanmar
- Genres: Pop; Indie pop
- Occupation: Singer
- Instruments: Vocals; guitar; piano
- Years active: 2013–present

Po Po Heather (Burmese: ပိုပိုဟေသာ; born 8 January 1998) is a Burmese singer. She became popular after releasing her single song Chit Tae Sate So Dar (ချစ်တဲ့စိတ်ဆိုတာ). She won the Best Pop Song of Summer Award in Myanmar Music Awards 2014 for this song.

== Early life and education ==
Po Po Heather was born on 8 January 1998 in Pyin Oo Lwin, Mandalay Region, Myanmar to parents Za Wah, a music composer and Myint Myint Win. She attended high school at Basic Education High School No. 5 Botataung. She graduated from Yangon University of Foreign Languages specialized in Korean language (B.A Korean) in 2019.

== Career ==
She learned a lot about music from her father since she was seven years old. It was because of her father that she came to love music. At the age of ten, she started sang the song Chit Tae Sate So Dar, written by her father. She began recorded this song on 4 April 2013. However, another recording was made on 4 July to make it more complete.

On 8 February 2014, the album named 9 Night Tri featured with her song Chit Tae Sate So Dar was released. On 20 February 2015, she won the Best Pop Song of Summer in Myanmar Music Awards 2014. In 2016, her debut solo album Kabar Oo Yee Sar was released. In 2018, her second solo album Shik Khwin Tine was released.

In 2019, she competed with Banana Mask in the first season of The Mask Singer Myanmar, aired on 15 November 2019 with song Nee Chin Way Chin Phyit Nyat Myar. On 9 October 2020, she sang with song Toh Lae Lite Mal at the music concert held in celebration of the 100th Anniversary of Burmese Film.

She featured with song Mar Yar Hlae Kwat Myar in Mar Yar Hlae Kwat TV series, aired on 5 October 2020, on MRTV-4.

On 4 December 2020, she sang the song Gangaw Yake Sakar at the music concert held in celebration of the 100th Anniversary of Yangon University.

== Discography ==
=== Album ===
- Kabar Oo Yee Sar (23.2.2016)
- Shik Khwin Tine (17.5.2018)

== Award ==
- The Best Pop Song of Summer (Myanmar Music Awards 2014)
