= Lain Maw Thee =

Burmese rock singer and songwriter

Lain Maw Thee လိမ္မော်သီး
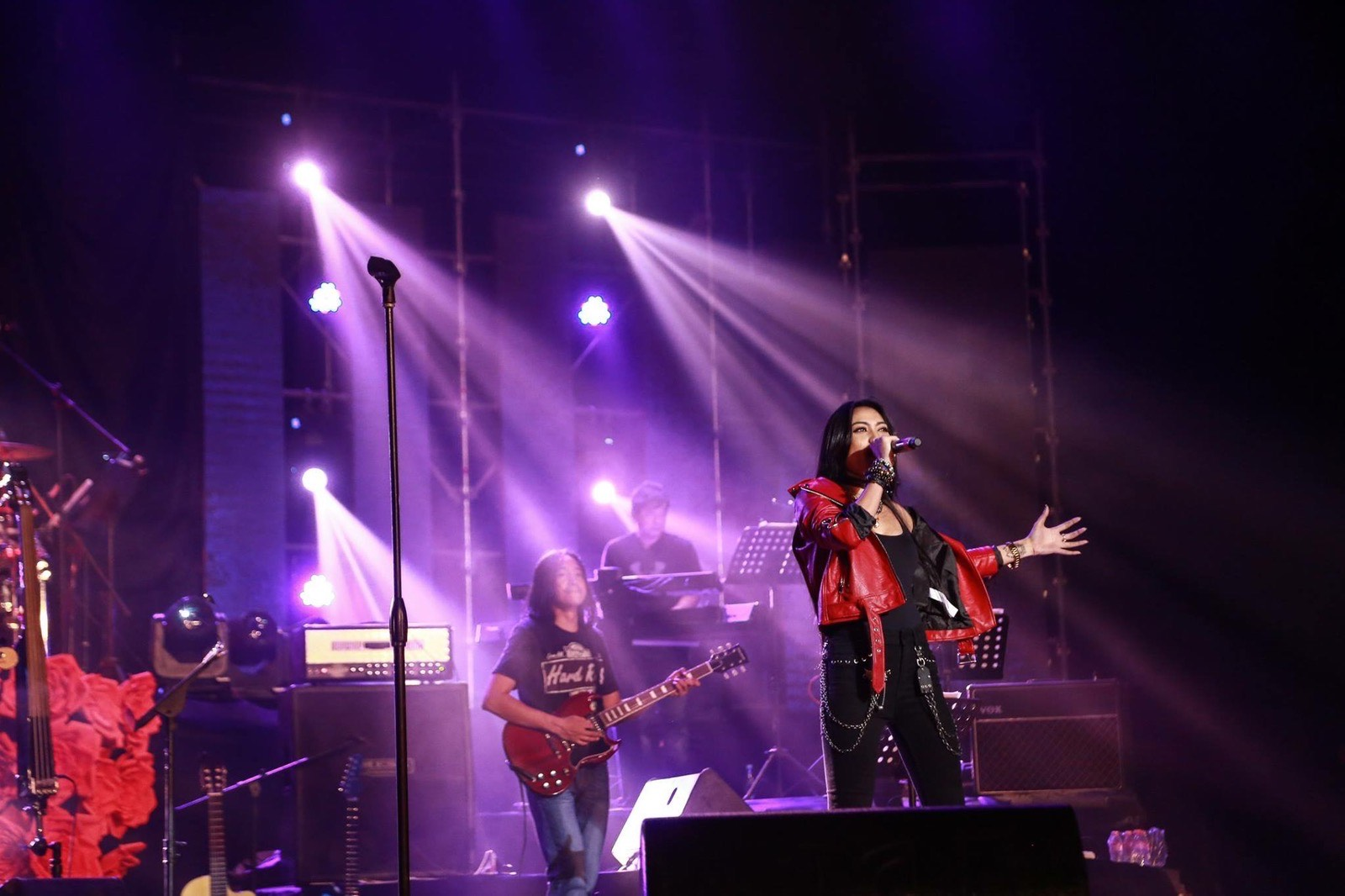
- Lain Maw Thee performing at the Thaw Di Wai A Tribute Concert in 2018

Background information
- Born: Mi Mon Mon Thike; 24 October 1989 (age 36); Yangon, Myanmar
- Genres: Rock, pop rock
- Occupation(s): Singer, songwriter
- Instrument: Vocals
- Years active: 2007–present

Lain Maw Thee JuNon (Burmese: လိမ္မော်သီး; lit. 'Orange', born Mi Mon Mon Thike (မိမွန်မွန်သိုက်) on 24 October 1989) is a Burmese rock singer and songwriter. She is considered one of the early female rock vocalists in Myanmar. A core supporter of the National League for Democracy, she actively participated and performed in the election campaign in November, 2015.

== Early life and education ==
Lain Maw Thee was born on 24 October 1989 in Yangon, Myanmar to ethnic Mon-Burmese Chinese descent parent. Her father is a Burmese Chinese descent and her mother is an ethnic Mon. She is the eldest child among four siblings. One of her siblings, Wai Lar Ri is an actress. Her parents divorced when she finished high school. She worked hard so that her siblings could go to school. She attended Dagon University, majoring in Law for second year.

== Career ==
In 2007, she started singing with the Nightingale Band at the Bogyoke Zay Thingyan concert. Shortly after, she officially joined the Nightingale Band and performed in many concerts. In 2010, she launched her debut solo album "Lain Maw Yaung Sate Kuu Myar". The follow-up VCD karaoke album was released in November 2012.

In 2013, she disappeared from the music and returned in 2015 after two-year absence from the public eye. She participated in group album, "Shwe FM 5 Years Anniversary". She released her second solo album "Dan Yar Hna Lone Thar" on 16 March 2016 was a success, gaining her a large following, and planted her as a leading singer in the Burmese music scene. In 2015, she started entertaining in Zaw Win Htut's Emperor Band. In February, she released a duet song named "Myet Won Nyo" together with her younger sister Wai La Ri which spawned more huge hits. Her third solo album "Athet Shin Mei Thu" was released on 19 December 2019 which was officially distributed to all parts of Myanmar.

== Discography ==
=== Solo albums ===
- Lain Maw Yaung Sate Kuu Myar (လိမ္မော်ရောင် စိတ်ကူးများ) (2010)
- Dan Yar Hna Lone Thar (ဒဏ်ရာနှလုံးသား) (2016)
- Athet Shin Mei Thu (အသက်ရှင်မဲ့သူ) (2019)
