= Beautiful Wives Club =

Burmese television series

- Burmese: ဇနီးချောများကွန်ရက်
- Genre: Drama
- Based on: Beautiful Wives Club by Lun Htar Htar
- Screenplay by: Zaw Myint Oo
- Directed by: Aung Aww Bar
- Starring: Soe Pyae Thazin; Mya Hnin Yee Lwin; May Barani Thaw; Khin Thazin
- Country of origin: Myanmar
- Original language: Burmese
- No. of episodes: 30

Production
- Production location: Myanmar
- Running time: 45 minutes
- Production company: Aung Pyi Entertainment

Original release
- Network: MRTV
- Release: 13 June – 29 August 2018

Beautiful Wives Club (Burmese: ဇနီးချောများကွန်ရက်) is a 2018 Burmese drama television series. It aired on MRTV from June 13 to August 29, 2018, every Wednesday, Thursday and Friday at 19:15 for 30 episodes.

== Cast ==
- Soe Pyae Thazin as Thanbu Khin
- Mya Hnin Yee Lwin as Madi Pyo May
- May Barani Thaw as Amara Maung
- Khin Thazin as Mar Yar
- Pho Thauk Kyar as Thwin Htoo
- Zay Ya as Dr. Su Thet Yin
- Nay Yan as Ni Ti
- Kyaw Kyaw as Thu Swe
