= Moe Nya Einmet Myu =

2009 Burmese Film

- Film poster
- Burmese: မိုးညအိပ်မက်မြူ
- Directed by: Kyi Phyu Shin
- Based on: Moe Nya Einmet Myu by Tekkatho Phone Naing
- Starring: Nay Toe; Moe Hay Ko; Thinzar Wint Kyaw; Soe Pyae Thazin
- Cinematography: Kyauk Phyu
- Edited by: Zaw Min
- Music by: Diramore
- Production company: Mahar Htun Film Production
- Release date: 2009
- Running time: 120 minutes
- Country: Myanmar
- Language: Burmese

Moe Nya Einmet Myu (Burmese: မိုးညအိပ်မက်မြူ) is a 2009 Burmese drama film starring Nay Toe, Moe Hay Ko, Thinzar Wint Kyaw and Soe Pyae Thazin. In this film, Nay Toe acted in characters of three life.

== Synopsis ==
The first character name of Nay Toe is Mg Nyo Maing and he meet with Dr. Ma Thet Yi. The second character name is Ko Myint Wai and he meet with Htar. The third character name is Ko Thit Sar and he meet with Chit Thet Nwe.

== Cast ==
=== Main ===
- Nay Toe as Mg Nyo Maing, Ko Myint Wai, Ko Thit Sar
- Moe Hay Ko as Dr. Ma Thet Yi
- Thinzar Wint Kyaw as Chit Thet Nwe
- Soe Pyae Thazin as Htar

=== Supporting ===
- Aung Lwin as U Ohn Hlaing
- Khin Thida Tun as Htar mommy, mother of Htar
- Ye Aung as Ko Min Lwin
- Nwet Nwet San as Daw Oo
- Htun Htun Win as U Min Khine
- Kutho as Myittar

== Award ==
Year	Award	Category	Nominee	Result
2009	Myanmar Motion Picture Academy Awards	Best Actor	Nay Toe	Won
2009	Myanmar Motion Picture Academy Awards	Best Supporting Actress	Soe Pyae Thazin	Won
