= Chaw Su Khin =

Burmese pop singer

Chaw Su Khin ချောစုခင်
- Born: Burma
- Origin: Burmese
- Genres: Pop
- Occupation: Singer
- Instrument: Voice
- Years active: 1977–present

Chaw Su Khin (Burmese: ချောစုခင်) is a Bamar-Mizo Burmese pop singer, known for her powerful voice. As of 2018, she had released 13 solo albums.

Born in Insein Township, Burma, she spent her formative years between Insein and Pinlebu Township, Sagaing Division, as one of four siblings. She began her musical career in the 1970s, earning money performing with her brother at a restaurant in Pinlebu.

She debuted with an album entitled Sunlight's Kiss (နေရောင်ခြည်ရဲ့ အနမ်း). A subsequent album, The Power of Compassion (အကြင်နာအင်အား), released in 2000, was a mainstream commercial success, and propelled her to fame. She held her first solo concert in 2018.

== Discography ==
- Sunlight's Kiss (နေရောင်ခြည်ရဲ့ အနမ်း)
- The Power of Compassion (အကြင်နာအင်အား) (2000)
- The Day We Meet Again (ပြန်ဆုံမယ့်နေ့) (2020)

== Personal life ==
Chaw Su Khin is married and has two daughters. Her cousin Kay Kay Moe is also a singer.
