= Lu Lu Sein =

2020 Burmese television series

- Poster
- Burmese: လူးလူးစိန်
- Genre: Comedy
- Screenplay by: Kyaung Taw Thar
- Story by: Aung Pyi Entertainment
- Directed by: Aung Aww Bar
- Starring: Soe Pyae Thazin; Kyaw Kyaw; May Barani Thaw
- Theme music composer: Moe Moe
- Country of origin: Myanmar
- Original language: Burmese
- No. of episodes: 40

Production
- Producer: May Thu Phay
- Production location: Myanmar
- Cinematography: Phyo Thu Kyaw; Ko Joh
- Running time: 45 minutes
- Production companies: Myanmar Media 7 Aung Pyi Entertainment

Original release
- Network: 5 Plus
- Release: 31 July – 30 October 2020

Lu Lu Sein (Burmese: လူးလူးစိန်) is a 2020 Burmese comedy television series. It aired on 5 Plus, from 31 July to 30 October 2020, on every Friday, Saturday and Sunday at 20:30 for 40 episodes.

== Cast ==
- Soe Pyae Thazin as Lu Lu Sein
- Kyaw Kyaw as Rosie
- May Barani Thaw as Saung Kha Hnin
- Thura Htoo as Lin Thu
- Min Hein
- Lin Zarni Zaw
