= Battle of Two Flowers =

Burmese television series

- Official poster
- Burmese: ပန်းနှစ်ပွင့်စီးချင်း
- Genre: Legal drama
- Screenplay by: Htet Myat Naing Zin
- Directed by: Min Khite Soe San
- Starring: Paing Phyo Thu; May Barani Thaw
- Theme music composer: Moe Moe
- Country of origin: Myanmar
- Original language: Burmese
- No. of episodes: 30

Production
- Production location: Myanmar
- Running time: 45 minutes
- Production company: Aung Pyi Entertainment

Original release
- Network: MRTV
- Release: 3 January – 9 March 2018

Battle of Two Flowers (Burmese: ပန်းနှစ်ပွင့်စီးချင်း) is a 2018 Burmese legal drama television series. It aired on MRTV, from 3 January, to 9 March 2018, on every Wednesday, Thursday and Friday at 19:15 for 30 episodes.

== Cast ==
- Paing Phyo Thu as Shwe Zawar
- May Barani Thaw as May Khattar
- Soe Yan Aung as Theinkha
- Htet Ko Ko Lin as La Pyae Aung
- Marco as Ye Lin Htun
- Yan Kyaw as U Ye Kyaw
- Ko Ko Lin Maung as U Htut Khaung
- Than Than Soe as Mother of May Khattar
- Khin Thazin as Jessica

== Awards ==
Year	Award	Category	Nominee	Result
2018	Star Awards	Best TV Series	Aung Pyi Entertainment	Won
