= Trapped (2022 TV series) =

Burmese television series

- Poster
- Burmese: ဗလာစာအုပ်
- Genre: Horror
- Created by: Canal+ (Myanmar)
- Screenplay by: Kyaw Kyaw Htun; Aye Moht Moht Aung
- Story by: Sao Khun Sit; Thiha Aung; Wai Hnin Thi; May Wah Lwin
- Directed by: Aung Myint Myat
- Starring: Phone Thiri Kyaw; Aung Zay Ya Min Htin; Wan Wang; Swan Htet Nyi Nyi; Aye Min Hein; Man Dana; Thinzar; Nan Eaindray
- Opening theme: "Trapped" by The Peacists
- Country of origin: Myanmar
- Original language: Burmese
- No. of episodes: 10

Production
- Executive producer: Forever Group
- Producer: Thida Mo Mo
- Production location: Myanmar
- Cinematography: Phone Naing; Aung Myo Oo
- Editor: Aye Su Su Lwin
- Running time: 45 minutes
- Production company: Canal+ (Myanmar)

Original release
- Network: Canal+ Zat Lenn
- Release: 2 June – 4 August 2022

Trapped (Burmese: ဗလာစာအုပ်, lit. 'Blank book') is a 2022 Burmese horror television series. It aired on Canal+ Zat Lenn, from June 2 to August 4, 2022, on every Thursday at 20:00 for 10 episodes.

== Synopsis ==
When a group of students left to work at night for a university prom open a mysterious book, they become trapped inside it and have to go on missions to get out and face supernatural events, will they be able to succeed?

== Cast ==
- Phone Thiri Kyaw as Hnin Set
- Aung Zay Ya Min Htin as Zaw Shein
- Wan Wang as San Madi
- Swan Htet Nyi Nyi as Ah Win
- Aye Min Hein as Han Gyi
- Man Dana as Saya San
- Thinzar as Cynthia
- Nan Eaindray as Natasha
