= Oak Soe Khant =

Burmese singer and musician

Oak Soe Khant အုပ်စိုးခန့်
- Born: 14 April 2002 (age 23); Pyay, Myanmar
- Genres: R&B, pop music, Mahagita
- Occupation: Musician
- Years active: 2018–present
- Website: Oak Soe Khant on Facebook

Oak Soe Khant (Burmese: အုပ်စိုးခန့်) is a Burmese singer and musician.

== Career ==
He debuted in December 2018 with the pop album The Number One, which became the country's best-selling solo album in 2019. In 2019, he featured in song "Ma Pyaw Pay Mae" alongside Kay Kay Moe in the film The Greatest Love. He also participated as a contestant in the reality singing competition The Mask Singer Myanmar. In 2020, he made his acting debut in the TV drama, Eikmet Dwe Moe Hta De Ein (အိပ်မက်တွေ မိုးထားတဲ့အိမ်).

In May 2020, he released a single "Possessor" (ပိုင်ရှင်), a remake of Zaw Win Shein's classic 1980s song. In June 2020, he was featured in May La Than Zin's album Renewing the Vintage Era, in a duet called "Yone Daw Hlut Daw" (ရုန်းတော်လွှတ်တော်). In 2021, he released the single "This Christmas" with Thai singer Knomjean Kulamas Sarasas. In 2022, he dabbled with classical Burmese songs (Mahagita), releasing the singles "Aura of Acclaim" (ထုတိဩဘာ; Thutiobhā) and "Stage of Vows, New Road to Nibbana" (အဓိဌာန်စခန်း နိဗ္ဗာန်လမ်းသစ်), the latter of which was a duet with Aye Mya Phyu.

== Discography ==
=== Albums ===
- The Number One (2018)

=== Singles ===
- "Possessor" (ပိုင်ရှင်) (2020)
- "Only You" (မင်းအချစ်တစ်ခုတည်း) (2020)
- "Anticipating You" (မျှော်နေတယ်) (2020)
- "Instagram" (2020)
- "Mama" (မမ) (2020)
- "Let's Love Rebelliously" (ခက်မိုက်မိုက်ချစ်ကြစို့) (2020)
- "New Century Lover" (ရာစုသစ်ချစ်သူ) (2021)
- "Mandalay in Love" (မန္တလေးသူပျိုဖြူချော) (2022)

== Filmography ==
- Eikmet Dwe Moe Hta De Ein (အိပ်မက်တွေ မိုးထားတဲ့အိမ်) (2020)
