= Emperor (Burmese band) =

Hard rock band in Myanmar

Emperor အင်ပရား
- Origin: Yangon, Myanmar
- Genres: Hard rock, heavy metal, Burmese rock
- Instruments: Guitar, vocals, drums, bass
- Years active: 1980s–present
- Labels: Independent
- Members: Zaw Win Htut (lead vocals, guitar)

Emperor (Burmese: အင်ပရား) is a Burmese hard rock and metal band from Myanmar, formed in the 1980s in Yangon. Led by Zaw Win Htut, the band is noted for its fusion of Western hard rock and heavy metal with traditional Burmese musical influences. Emperor has been influential in shaping the rock music scene in Myanmar, garnering a dedicated following both domestically and among Burmese expatriates.

== History ==
Emperor was formed in the 1980s in Yangon when lead vocalist and guitarist Zaw Win Htut decided to explore a heavier musical style. At a time when many Burmese bands were primarily performing traditional or soft rock music, Emperor distinguished itself by embracing a harder edge influenced by Western rock and metal. Their pioneering approach helped pave the way for a new generation of rock and metal acts in Myanmar.

== Musical Career ==
Emperor quickly built a reputation for their energetic live performances and powerful sound. Their music blends electric guitar riffs, driving drum beats, and aggressive vocals with elements of Burmese musical traditions. The band has released several albums and singles over the decades, which have contributed to the evolution of Myanmar’s rock and metal genres.

== Discography ==
While documentation of all releases is incomplete, available sources indicate that Emperor’s discography includes several key albums and singles:

=== Albums ===
- အကြမ်းဖက်သံ (Aggressive Sound) – 1983
- အမှတ်တရ (Memories) – 1984
- သံစဉ် (Rhythms) – 1985
- ရင်ခုန်သံ (Heartbeat) – 1987
- လက်တလော (Contemporary) – 1990
- အလင်းရောင်နှင့် အမှောင် (Light and Darkness) – 1993
- အဆုံးသတ် (Finale) – 1997

=== Singles ===
- "Kyan Taw" – 1984
- "Rockin’ Myanmar" – 1986
- "မီးစက်ရထား (Fire Engine)" – 1988
- "အပြေးသွား (Run Away)" – 1990
- "ထပ်တလဲလဲ (Again)" – 1992

== Legacy ==
Emperor is widely regarded as one of the pioneering hard rock and metal bands in Myanmar. Their innovative fusion of Western rock styles with Burmese musical traditions helped redefine the country’s popular music landscape during the 1980s and beyond. Emperor’s sound and style have influenced subsequent Burmese rock and metal bands and continue to be celebrated by fans of the genre.
