= Zaw Win Htut =

Burmese hard rock singer (born 1964)

Zaw Win Htut ဇော်ဝင်းထွဋ်
- Birth name: Zaw Win Htut
- Also known as: Nyi Htut
- Born: 21 January 1964 (age 61); Yangon, Myanmar
- Genres: Rock, hard rock, pop rock, country, blues rock
- Occupation(s): Singer, music producer
- Instrument: Vocals
- Years active: 1980–present
- Labels: EMG, Master Recording
- Member of: Emperor

Zaw Win Htut (Burmese: ဇော်ဝင်းထွဋ်, pronounced [zɔ̀ wɪ́ɰ̃ tʰʊʔ]; 21 January 1964) is a Burmese hard rock singer. He is the founder and lead vocalist of the band Emperor.

== Early life ==
Zaw Win Htut was born into a musical family in Yangon, Myanmar. His father Kyi Khin (ကြည်ခင်) was a physician, and his mother Tin Aye was a famous Burmese classical singer with the stage name Hta (ထား). His maternal grandfather was Shwe Taing Nyunt (ရွှေတိုင်ညွန့်), a famous songwriter of classical Burmese music. His nickname was Nyi Htut. He received a bachelor's degree in zoology from Yangon University.

== Career ==
Zaw Win Htut began his career in music as a drummer in a band called Oasis. He formed his own band, Emperor, in the 1980s with five members: Zaw Myo Htut (his brother and lead guitarist), Kyin Kham Phone (bass), Wai Tun (drums), Maung Maung Lwin (keyboards), John O'Hara (acoustics). He was strictly a country and rock and roll singer in his early career. His first album,"Mercury Night" released in 1983, was not a success. He produced three more solo albums, "New Road", "Comet", and "Power of Love" but they were not much of success either. In 1989, his greatest hits album "The Bests of Zaw Win Htut" was a huge success and made him a rock star.

=== Wearing someone else's clothes ===
Like most Burmese pop singers, Zaw Win Htut became famous with Burmese language covers of foreign (mostly Western rock and pop) hits, written by successful cover "songwriters" such as Thukhamein Hlaing, Min Chit Thu, Win Min Htwe, and Saw Khu Sae. Unlike most Burmese pop stars, this grandson of Shwe Taing Nyunt was actually embarrassed about it. He famously said that singing those songs were like wearing someone else's shirt. In a 2004 interview he said that his goal was to make original music.

He decided to make only "original" (i.e. non-cover) albums in mid 1990s. He was one of the first artists in the Burmese pop music industry to break away from the cover song mold so many Burmese artists follow. He did score a few hits with A-Hnaing-Me and Achit Mya Thu Si Mha. He continues to perform his famous cover hits in concerts although he performs only the original songs in his overseas concerts. In a 2010 interview, he admitted that he refused to do any concerts overseas for many years because he did not have a sufficient number of original songs, and that he began doing overseas concerts only after he had collected enough original songs. In the same interview he said he had done over 20 overseas concerts.

In 2000, he introduced the blues to his records.

=== Politics ===
"Though their profession calls for them to strut onstage like rebels, Burma's rockers can only mime the anti-establishment part. Zaw Win Htut works in the sanitized vacuum of a country run by military rulers who view him automatically as a threat, a potential subversive, because he holds a microphone. Burma's cultural input is zealously monitored and artistic expression heavily censored."

"As one of Burma's biggest rock stars, Zaw Win Htut faces constant government scrutiny of his lyrics, album covers and music videos, but some of his biggest clashes concerned the length of his hair."

=== Emperor band ===
The Emperor band consists of six members. Original founders are Zaw Win Htut[Vocals], Zaw Myo Htut [Lead Guitar], John Ohara [Rhythm Guitar], Boe Kyin [Bass], Leonard Maung Maung Lwin [Keyboard] and Wai Tun [Drums].

Current members

- Vocals: Zaw Win Htut
- Lead guitar: Zaw Myo Htut
- Rhythm guitar: John Ohara
- Bass guitar: Myat Moe
- Keyboards: Leonard Maung Maung Lwin
- Keyboards: Bosco
- Drums: Ye Linn

Former members

- Bass guitar: Boe Kyin(Cin Khan Pum)Siyin Chin
- Drums: Wai Tun
- Percussion: Sai Thar Htay

== Personal life ==
Zaw Win Htut has a love for and is a supporter of other forms of arts. One of his dreams is to live in a house full of beautiful paintings. He has a collection of about 100 paintings by famous artists and others who are not so well known.

His passion other than the music career is painting.

Zaw Win Htut is married to May Khaing Ohn, and they have a son who is also a singer, guitarist and songwriter Ito (Win Htut Thawdar) and a daughter Chan Chan (Win Htut Tara).

His Motorcycle club “The Beasts” is also very famous among Myanmar Bike Industry. Most of the club members are Famous actors and singers. Founded in 2017. Members of the beasts MC are well known business youngsters and also some CEOs of Myanmar major business organizations are the members.

On 17 April 2020, Zaw Win Htut take a self Quarantine for COVID-19, amidst the COVID-19 pandemic, which he became the first self Quarantine patient public figure in Myanmar that reported to Duwun media.

== Discography ==
=== Single albums ===
- Mercury Nya (Mercury Night)
- Achit Swan-in (The Power of Love)
- Kye Dagun (Comet)
- Lann Thit [(New Way)..With his Brother]
- Best of Zaw Win Htut
- Rock Tasay (Rock Ghost)
- Shay Pyay (Fore-runner)
- Shin Than Chin (Surviving) (1986)
- Shin Than Chin 2 (Surviving 2) (1989)
- Yazawin (History) (1991)
- Nayar Thit (New Place) (1993)
- Kayee Thwar Migo Dan Myar (Travelling Smoke ranges) (1994)
- Say Soe Pan Yite Myat Nhar (Face) (1995)
- Maha (Grandeur) (1995)
- Gypsy Moe Tain (Gypsy Cloud) (1996)
- Say Baung Kha Dae Nya (1997)
- Tasay Lan (Ghost Lane) (2008)
- Say Baung Kha Dae Nya
- Achit Myar Thu Si Mhar (1998)
- Amone Myo Yae Away Mhar (Away from the City of Hatred) (2000)
- Pya Tike Htal Ka Nay/ Nya (Day and Night in the Museum) (2002)
- Myaw Lint Chin Ka Yee Thal Myar (1998)
- Myaw Lint Chin Kan Chay (Hopeful Beach) (2005)
- Shin Than Chin Anhit 20 Liveshow (Surviving 20 years) (2006)
- Moe Htae (In the Rain) (2009)
- Lu (Human) (2013)
- “Ah Sone Ma Shi Myar” (2019)

=== Compilation albums ===
- Hlyatsit Moe Kaungkin (Lightning Cloud) (1989)
- Hlyatsit Moe Kaungkin 2 (Lightning Cloud 2) (1991)
- Rock 'N Roll Thingyan (1994)
- Wutkyway (Sins) (1997)
- 1998 Lat Saung (1998 Present) (1998)
- 1999 Lat Saung (1999 Present) (1999)
- 2000 Lat Saung (2000 Present) (2000)
- Zaw Win Htut Yazawin Hnint Tay Series Gaung Sin Myar (Zaw Win Htut's Discography and Music Series' Titles) (2005)
- Kyanawdo Gita Yatwunmha (in our music industry) (2006)
- Summer Angel (2019)

=== Couple albums ===
- Achain Daing Nay Yar Daing (Anytime, Anywhere)
- Big V
- City FM Thu Khit Koe Khit (Their Age, Our Age)
- Nayt Thit Tway The Mhar (In the New Days)
- Thone Yarthi Chitthu (Lover for 3 Seasons)
- Zaw Win Htut Gaungzin Thachinmya (Album Titled Songs)
