= Mi Sandi =

Mi Sandi မိစန္ဒီ
- Born: 12 June 1990 (age 36); Yangon, Myanmar
- Genre: Hip hop
- Occupation: Singer

Mi Sandi (Burmese: မိစန္ဒီ; born 12 June 1990) is a Burmese hip-hop singer of Mon descent.

== Early life and education ==
Mi Sandi was born on 12 June 1990 in Yangon, Myanmar. She graduated from International Management College in 2010 with a Bachelor of Business Management (BBM). She received a diploma in Accounting and Management Accounting from LCCI in 2011 and a Master of Business Management (MBA) in 2014.

== Career ==
She gained popularity with the song "Frozen Smile" (ရေခဲရိုက်အပြုံး), which she performed alongside G Fatt in 2017. The crossover between the two fan bases was hugely successful.

In 2013, she released the song "Ma Nyo Nyin Yat Bu", featuring singer Yair Yint Aung.

== Honours and awards ==
- Special Music Award of the Monsoon, 2014
- The Best Selling Studio Music Album, Female Vocalist of the Year, 2018 (City FM).

== Discography ==
=== Solo albums ===
- Monopoly (မိုနိုပိုလီ) (2013)
- Pyit Daing Htaung (ပစ်တိုင်းထောင်) (2014)
- Little Heart (အသဲလေး) (2017)
- Frozen Courage (သတ္တိခဲ) (2019)

=== Single albums ===
- With Much Love (ချစ်ခြင်းများစွာဖြင့်) (2015)
- Little Pillow (ခေါင်းအုံးလေး) (2016)
- Brainless Dummy (ဦးနှောက်မဲ့ငတုံး) (2018)
- Fearing the Rain (မိုးမိမှာစိုးတယ်) (2018)
- Empty Pocket (2018)
- High-5 (2018)
- I Would (2019)
- Competition is Intensifying (ပြိုင်ဆိုင်မှုတွေပြင်းထန်နေတယ်) (2019)
- Do it All Again (2019)
- Falling Hard (2019)
- A Thae Kwal A Pay A Tay (အသဲကွဲအပေအတေ) (2019)
