= Khin Poe Panchi =

Burmese singer

Khin Poe Panchi ခင်ပိုးပန်းချီ
- Born: Khin Poe Panchi; 1 December 2003 (age 22); Yangon, Myanmar
- Genres: Pop, Burmese classical music
- Occupation: Singer
- Instruments: Vocals; guitar
- Years active: 2012–present

Khin Poe Panchi (Burmese: ခင်ပိုးပန်းချီ; born 1 December 2003) is a Burmese singer, with a repertoire spanning multiple genres including Buddhist Dhamma songs and the Mahagita, the corpus of Burmese classical songs.

Khin won a gold medal at the National Performing Arts Competition. She has released several albums including Me Yway Lo Hsin Ba Me (မယ်ရွေးလို့ဆင်ပါ့မယ်) in 2015, Auspicious Moment (မင်္ဂလာအခါတော်) in 2019, and Magnificent Almsgiving (ခမ်းနားတဲ့အလှူ) in 2020. In 2019, she performed the theme song "Until We Meet Again" for the blockbuster film The Only Mom.

== Discography ==
- Auspicious Moment (မင်္ဂလာအခါတော်) (2019)
- Magnificent Almsgiving (ခမ်းနားတဲ့အလှူ) (2020)
