= Yarwana =

Burmese pop singer

Yarwana ရာဝန
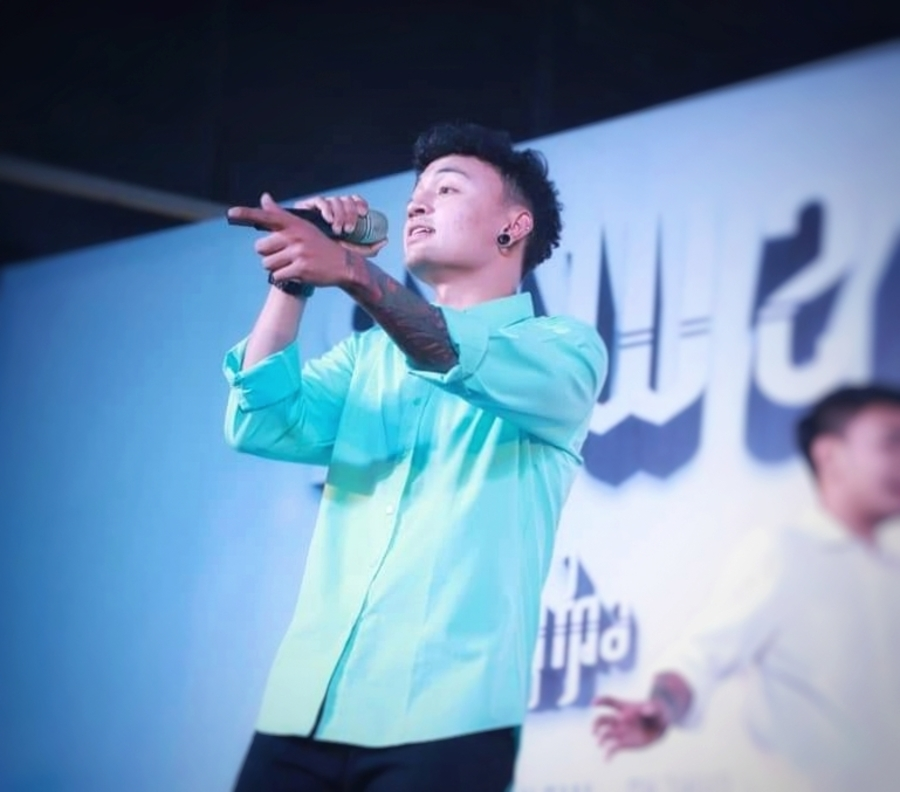
- Yarwana performing at his album Answer release show

Background information
- Born: Ye Lin Naung; 25 September 1992 (age 33); Yangon, Myanmar
- Genres: R&B; pop
- Occupations: Singer, songwriter
- Instrument: Vocals
- Years active: 2015–present

Yarwana (Burmese: ရာဝန; born Ye Lin Naung on 25 September 1992) is a Burmese singer who rose to fame with his album Answer. His hit song "Kyal Kalay" was the longest leading No 2 in Myanmar Top Chart on JOOX. (Note: Joox is the country's only national music chart.)

== Career ==
Yarwana began his music career in 2015, as a singer in the underground music. He released his debut album One Percent on 16 September 2018. His second album MIXED was released in 2019. On 20 September 2020, he released a single song with featured artists, Yaw Yazt, called "Tine Ser" which peaked at number one on Myanmar Top Chart on Joox. He released his third album Answer on 1 March 2020 which was officially distributed to all parts of Myanmar. The album was a success, gaining him a large following, and planted him as a popular singer in the Burmese music scene. He held an album release show in Yangon where a crowd of thousands of fans gathered.

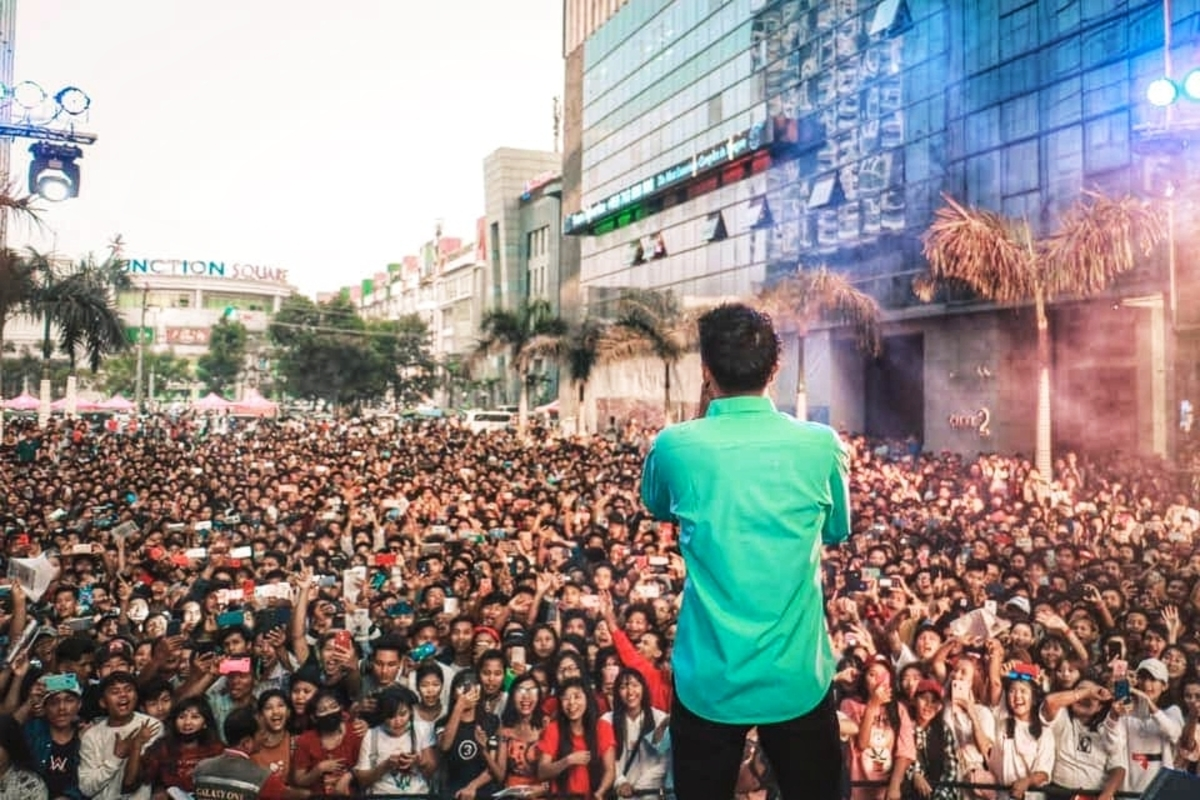
Yarwana performance at his album release show

He released a single called "Kyal Kalay" on 20 March 2020 which peaked at number one on Myanmar Top Chart on Joox, and was listed the longest leading No 2 in Myanmar Top Chart. Yarwana is named in Joox's "Top Artists".

== Discography ==
=== Albums ===
- One Percent (2018)
- MIXED (2019)
- Answer (2020)

=== Singles ===
- "Lan Ma Kwel Like Par Nae" (လမ်းမခွဲလိုက်ပါနဲ့) (2018)
- "Visitor" (ဧည့်သည်) (2019)
- "Hna Ko Tu" (နှစ်ကိုယ်တူ) (2019)
- "Tine Ser" (တိုင်စာ) (2019)
- "Mone" (မုန်း) (2019)
- "Kyal Kalay" (ကြယ်ကလေး) (2020)
- "The Most Beautiful Icon" (အလှဆုံးဣတ္ထိယ) (2020)
- "Myat Yay" (မျက်ရည်) (2020)
