= Soe Pyae Thazin =

Burmese actress and singer

- စိုးပြည့်သဇင်
- Born: Soe Pyae Thazin; 22 September 1992 (age 33); Taungoo, Myanmar
- Occupations: Actress, singer, Female model award
- Years active: 2005–present
- Spouse: Hein Wai Yan (m. 2025)
- Parents: U Soe Naing (father); Daw Mar Lar Khin (mother)
- Awards: Myanmar Academy Award (Best Supporting Actress for 2009) (Best Actress for 2020)

Soe Pyae Thazin (Burmese: စိုးပြည့်သဇင်; born 22 September 1992) is a Myanmar Academy Award winning Burmese actress and singer. She won her first special Myanmar Academy Award for Best Supporting Actress with the film Moe Nya Einmet Myu in 2009 at the age of 18. She has achieved fame and success as an actress and singer. Throughout her career, she has acted in over 100 films.

== Early life and career ==
Soe Pyae was born in Yangon and grew up in Taungoo, Myanmar. She started her acting career in ninth grade. Since she was young, she won so many awards at school contest for her signing, playing guitar and piano. Later, she moved to Yangon again to become a singer and her first song was "I Really Love You, My Love" which she sang at her cousin's wedding. Later, she starred in a movie and became famous as an actress; gaining more fans at her first leading role movie with Nay Toe in "The Time Of Solar Eclipse". Her first solo album, "Chit Thu Yway Mal" (Having Found Love) was released in 2012.

== Family ==
She is a member of the well-known Soe family. Her father is a veterinarian and her mother is a teacher. Her cousins include actresses Soe Myat Thuzar, Soe Myat Kalayar and Soe Myat Nandar, as well as actress and hip hop artist Sandi Myint Lwin.

She married her lifetime co-star, Hein Wai Yan in late December 2025.

== Donations ==
Soe Pyae Thazin made a donation to the Aggapay Metta Youth Development Orphanage on 22 September to mark her 22nd birthday.

== Filmography ==
=== Film ===
- A Chit Ka Lan Tal (2008)
- Moe Nya Einmet Myu (2009)
- Yok Khama Nae Ta Htaung Ta Nya (2009)
- Chit Kan Pwint Nae Ma Chaw Lay Sal (2009)
- A Chit Lar Lar Htar (2010)
- Nga Nhama Lay Pwa Thwar P (2011)
- Good Shal Thamat (2011)
- I Love You (2011)
- A Lann Lun A Lun Lann (2012)
- A Mone Mee Tauk (2012)
- A Mike Sar (2013)
- A Chit Myar Nae Phan Sin Mal (2014)
- Khoe Khoe Khit Khit (2014)
- Chit San Eain 2028 (2015)
- Khout Htee Kalay Ma Lone Ta Loan (2017)
- Pyat Tha Nar (2019)
- Kan Ma Pha La (2020)
- Golden Princess (2020)
- Kyay Nyi Naung (2022)
- Than Yaw Zin Tway Thar Kyi San Tway Pyit Khae Yin (2024)

== Television series ==
- Beautiful Wives Club (2018)

- Lu Lu Sein (2020)

- အချစ်ကြိုးဝိုင်း (2022)

- လရောင်အောက်ကကုမုဒြာ (2024)

- ဇော (2024)

- မျက်နှာဖုံး (2025)

- Kyin Phaw (2025)

== Discography ==
=== Solo albums ===
- ချစ်သူရွေးမယ် (Having Found Love) (2012)

== Awards ==
Year	Award	Category	Film	Result
2009	Myanmar Motion Picture Academy Awards	Best Supporting Actress	Moe Nya Einmet Myu	Won
2020	Myanmar Motion Picture Academy Awards	Best Actress	Golden Princess	Won
