= Yadanar My =

Burmese singer

Yadanar My ရတနာမိုင်
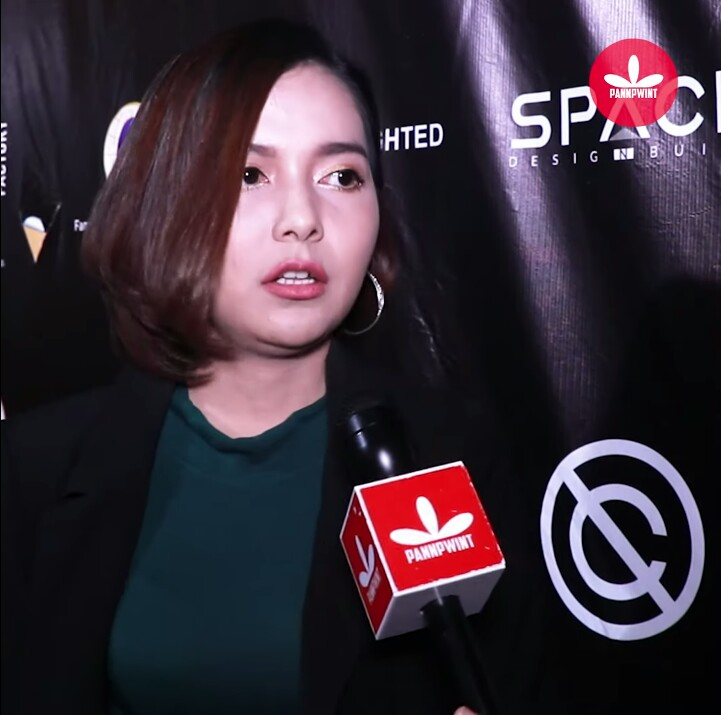
- Yadanar My in 2020

Background information
- Born: 17 August 1988 (age 37); Ramree, Myanmar
- Genres: Pop
- Occupations: Singer, actress
- Instruments: Vocals; guitar; piano
- Years active: 2006–present

Radanar My (Burmese: ရတနာမိုင်; born 17 August 1989) is a Burmese singer and actress of ethnic Rakhine descent. She is best known for her pop songs; such as "A Lwan Thint Pan Chi", "Good Night", "Thu Thi Say", "Pyaw Thar Pae", "Ma May Par Nae Yo Yo Lay" and "Lo Yar Thone".

== Early life and education ==
Yadanar My was born on 17 August 1989 in Ley Taung town in Ramree, Rakhine State, Myanmar. She is the daughter of the once-successful singer Mai and inherited her artistic heritage. She attended at Basic Education High School No. 2 Latha and moved to Basic Education High School No. 1 Dagon.

== Career ==
She started her career in 2006 with the song "Far Away" and celebrated City FM's 6th anniversary with her mother Mai. The song "Don't Call" was well received by the audience. She was released five albums and the songs; "A Lwan Thint Pan Chi", "Good Night", "Thu Thi Say", "Pyaw Thar Pae", "Ma May Par Nae Yo Yo Lay", "Lo Yar Thone" were the most popular among audience. Yadanar Mai inherited her mother's legacy and has been in the music business for a long time. Also on the field of film, she starred as the student Yadanar Mai in the film Future of The Starlets, directed by Kyi Phyu Shin. She also starred in Ar Yone Oo Mhar Phoo The Kyar and If I Can Hate, I Want to Hate film. Although more successful as a singer than an actor but the audience accepted both.

== Discography ==
=== Album ===
- Ma Shi Loh Ma Phyit
- Pa Pha Ba Ba Ma
- Good Night, Lover
- Thu Thi Say
- Pyaw Thar Pae
- Who are you

== Accolades ==
Award	Year (Note: Indicates the year of ceremony. Each year is linked to the article about the awards held that year, wherever possible.)	Recipient(s) and nominee(s)	Category	Result	Ref.
City FM awards	2018	Yadanar My	Most Popular Female Vocalist of the Year	Won	
Shwe FM awards	2016	Yadanar My	Female Singer Award of Most Requested Song	Won	
