= Nyi Nyi Maung =

Burmese make-up artist and actress

- ညီညီမောင်
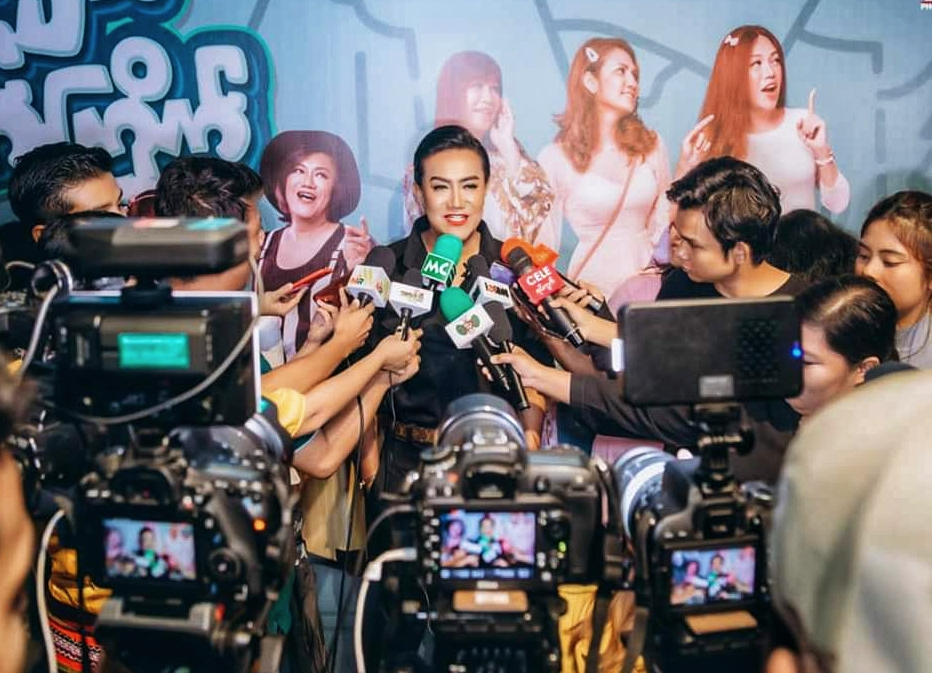
- Nyi Nyi Maung at her film press show
- Born: Nyi Nyi Maung; 30 June 1981 (age 45); Yangon, Myanmar
- Education: University of West Yangon
- Occupations: Make-up artist, actress
- Years active: 2000–present

Nyi Nyi Maung (Burmese: ညီညီမောင်; also known as Thu Thu, born 30 June 1981) is a Burmese make-up artist turned actress after two decades-long experience in the Myanmar makeup industry. For decades she was known by the nickname Nyi Nyi Maung - San Chaung while working as a make-up artist, before her acting debut. Nyi Nyi Maung featured on The Myanmar Times "Top 10 Make-up artists" list in 2018.

== Early life and education ==
Nyi Nyi Maung was born on 30 June 1981 in Yangon, Myanmar. She was the only son in the family and favoured a female identity and was constantly misunderstood, discriminated against, and abused, even within the family. She attended high school at Basic Education High School No. 2 Kamayut (St.Augustine) and graduated from the University of West Yangon with a degree in Botany.

== Career ==
In 2000s, she learned doing make-up from make-up artist Aung Aung (Taunggyi). At age 27, she opened a beauty salon in Yangon. She offered to work for popular movie stars and made a name for herself in the make-up industry. She rose to prominence while working with actresses Nandar Hlaing, Pa Pa Win Khin, Chaw Yadanar and others, arranging their hair and changing their looks. She was active an advocate for LGBT community.

In 2018, she had posted dozens of sit-com style comedy videos to Facebook. Her posted comedy videos on Facebook was noticed by the film industry and soon, film casting offers came rolling in. She made her big-screen debut with the main role in the comedy film Kyar Kyar Kyite Kyite, alongside Myint Myat, Min Maw Kun, Khin San Win, Linn Linn and Ma Htet. The film was directed by Pyi Hein Thiha which premiered in Myanmar cinemas on 29 August 2019. Her portrayal of the LGBT character was praised by fans for her acting performance and character interpretation, and experienced a resurgence of popularity. She then starred in her second film A Htein Taw where she played the main role with Myint Myat, Shin Mwe La, Linn Linn and Ei Chaw Po.

== Filmography ==
=== Film (Cinema) ===
Year	Title	Director	Co-Stars	Role
2019	Kyar Kyar Kyite Kyite	Pyi Hein Thiha	Myint Myat, Min Maw Kun, Khin San Win, Linn Linn, Ma Htet	Main
2020	A Htein Taw	Khin Hlaing	Myint Myat, Shin Mwe La, Linn Linn, Ei Chaw Po	Main
