= The Greatest Love (2019 film) =

2019 Burmese romantic drama film

- Film poster
- Burmese: အခမ်းနားဆုံးမေတ္တာ
- Directed by: Phwint Theingi Zaw
- Written by: Moe Ni Lwin
- Starring: Nay Toe; Nay Chi Oo; Thu Riya; Tyron Bejay; May Barani Thaw
- Cinematography: Nay Hein
- Production company: 7th Sense Film Production
- Release date: October 17, 2019
- Running time: 120 minutes
- Country: Myanmar
- Language: Burmese

The Greatest Love (Burmese: အခမ်းနားဆုံးမေတ္တာ, romanized: Akhan Nar Sone Myittar), is a 2019 Burmese romantic-drama film starring Nay Toe, Nay Chi Oo, Thu Riya, Tyron Bejay and May Barani Thaw. The film, produced by 7th Sense Film Production premiered in Myanmar on October 17, 2019.

== Cast ==
- Nay Toe as Tat Lu Naing
- Nay Chi Oo as Leik Pyar
- Thu Riya as Di Par
- Tyron Bejay as Tyron
- May Barani Thaw as May Paing
- Soe Myat Thuzar as Angelin
