= Zwe Pyae =

Burmese singer, musician and actor

Zwe Pyae ဇွဲပြည့်
- Born: Zarni Maung Maung; 30 November 1988 (age 37); Mandalay, Union of Burma
- Genres: Pop
- Occupations: Singer; Actor
- Instrument: Vocals
- Years active: 2011–present

Zwe Pyae (Burmese: ဇွဲပြည့်, born Zarni Maung Maung on 30 November 1988) is a prominent contemporary Burmese singer, musician and actor. He rose to fame with his debut album International Heart Broken Day.

== Early life and education ==
Zwe Pyae was born on 30 November 1988 in Mandalay, Burma to Maung Maung and Khin Htar May, the owner of an agricultural supply shop. Born to a Burmese Muslim family, Zwe Pyae's Muslim name is Sulaiman. He is the youngest son of 5 children, including 1 elder brother and 4 elder sisters. Zwe Pyae's family is involved in commerce in Pakokku, Magwe Region. He attended Basic Education High School No. 11 Mandalay and is presently pursuing an LLB degree at Yadanabon University.

== Career ==
=== Music career ===
Zwe Pyae began his music career in 2011. He launched his debut solo album International Heart Broken Day on 30 November 2014. Since he has released a solo album, he got big break in music industry and performed in many concerts. He released his second solo album Refuge (ခိုလှုံရာ) in February 2017 and Refuge video album released on 27 May 2018. His third solo album Arr Koe Par was released on 28 February 2019. He has released 3 solo albums and over 50 collaborative albums in his music career.

=== Acting career ===
Zwe made his acting debut with 2018 film Do Ghosts Have Horns? (သရဲဆိုတာချိုနဲ့လား), alongside Yamin May Oo. In the same year, he starred in his second film International Heart Broken Day alongside Su Pan Htwar. The film was adapted from his song. He then starred in his third film Ma Gyi San and Her Lovers alongside Khin San Win, in 2016. His first television series Two Flower Jousting was aired on MRTV in March 2018.

== Personal life ==
Zwe married a Pyin U Lwin native, Zali Moe, on 20 July 2019.

== Filmography ==
=== Big Screen Films ===
- Do Ghosts Have Horns? (သရဲဆိုတာချိုနဲ့လား) (2016)

=== Film ===
- International Heart Broken Day (2016)
- Ma Gyi San and Her Lovers (2017)

=== Television series ===
- Two Flower Jousting (2018)

== Discography ==
=== Solo albums ===
- International Heart Broken Day (အပြည်ပြည်ဆိုင်ရာ အသည်းကွဲသောနေ့) (2014)
- Refuge (ခိုလှုံရာ) (2017)
- Arr Koe Par (အားကိုးပါ) (2019)

=== Collaborative albums ===
- Over 50 collaborative albums
