= Khin San Win =

Burmese make-up artist, fashion designer, hair specialist and actress

- ခင်စန်းဝင်း
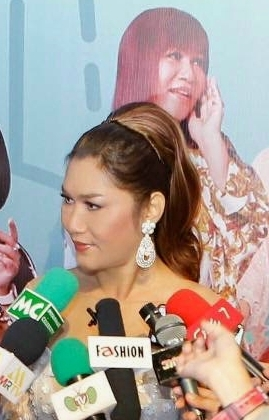
- Khin San Win at the Kyar Kyar Kyite Kyite film press show in January 2020
- Born: 8 June 1965 (age 61); Yangon, Myanmar
- Education: University of Yangon
- Occupations: Make-up artist, fashion designer, actress
- Years active: 1983–present

Khin San Win (Burmese: ခင်စန်းဝင်း; born 8 June 1965) is a Burmese make-up artist, fashion designer, hair specialist-turned-actress. As a make-up artist, she was known by the nickname Ma Gyi San. She featured on The Myanmar Times "Top 10 Make-up artists" list in 2018.

== Early life and education ==
Khin San Win was born on 8 June 1965 in Yangon, Myanmar, and was raised with three brothers and one sister. She favoured a female identity and was constantly misunderstood, discriminated against, abused and treated with violence, even within the family.

She attended high school at Basic Education High School No. 2 Dagon and graduated from University of Yangon.

== Career ==
=== Make-up artist ===
At the age of 18, she learned from make-up artists Ko Toe and Sandi. When she was 21, she opened a hairdressing salon on 34th Street in Yangon. She offered to work for popular movie stars and made a name for herself in the make-up industry. She rose to prominence while working with actresses Htet Htet Moe Oo, Htoo Mon, Myo Thandar Htun and others. She started a dress service in 1991.

She owns a bridal make-up and wedding dress service, teaches make-up classes and enjoys popularity amongst the country's LGBT community.

=== Acting career ===
She made her acting debut with a leading role in the 2016 film Ma Gyi San and Her Lovers, alongside Htet Aung Shine and Zwe Pyae, directed by Myat Khine.

In 2017, she starred in her second film Tanay Mhar Maung Ko De A Kyaung Tway Pyaw Pya Ya Oo Mal, alongside Aye Chan Maung, directed by Naing Myo Tun. The film was released on 27 February 2018.

In 2018, she took on her first big-screen role in a comedy movie Kyar Kyar Kyite Kyite, where she played the main role with Myint Myat, Min Maw Kun, Nyi Nyi Maung, Linn Linn and Ma Htet. The film was directed by Pyi Hein Thiha which premiered in Myanmar cinemas on 29 August 2019. Her portrayal of the LGBT character earned praised by fans for her acting performance and character interpretation, and experienced a resurgence of popularity.

== LGBT support ==
Khin San Win is a supporter of the LGBT rights in Myanmar and actively participates in many LGBT rights campaigns in Yangon. She is also lobbying for the abolishing of Article 377 of Myanmar's Penal Code.

== Filmography ==
=== Film (Cinema) ===
- Kyar Kyar Kyite Kyite (ကျားကျားကြိုက်ကြိုက်) (2019)

=== Film ===
- Ma Gyi San and Her Lovers (မကြီးစန်းနှင့် သူ၏ချစ်သူများ) (2016)
- Tanay Mhar Maung Ko De A Kyaung Tway Pyaw Pya Ya Oo Mal (တစ်နေ့မှမောင့်ကို ဒီအကြောင်းတွေပြောပြရဦးမယ်) (2018)
