= Sophia Everest =

Burmese singer and actress

Sophia Everest ဆိုဖီယာ အဲဗရက်စ်
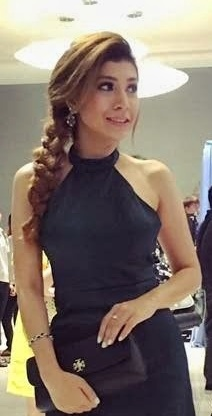
- Sophia Everest at Shwe FM Show, Novotel Yangon Max

Background information
- Born: Myat Su Khine; 30 April 1992 (age 33); Yangon, Myanmar
- Genres: R&B; Pop
- Occupations: Singer; Actress
- Instrument: Vocals
- Years active: 2015–present

Sophia Everest (Burmese: ဆိုဖီယာ အဲဗရက်စ်, also Sophia Everest Aurora; born Myat Su Khine on 30 April 1992) is a Burmese singer and actress. She gained recognition from competing in the first season of Myanmar Idol, a televised singing competition.

== Early life and education ==
Sophia Everest was born on 30 April 1992 in Yangon, Myanmar. She is the second daughter of three siblings, having an older sister and younger brother. She is a practicing Buddhist. She attended high school at Practising School Yangon Institute of Education and graduated in Biotechnology from Republic Polytechnic in 2014. Everest was interested in singing since childhood, participating in City FM singing contest, and winning first prize when she was 11 years old.

== Music career ==
=== 2016: Competing in Myanmar Idol and recognition ===
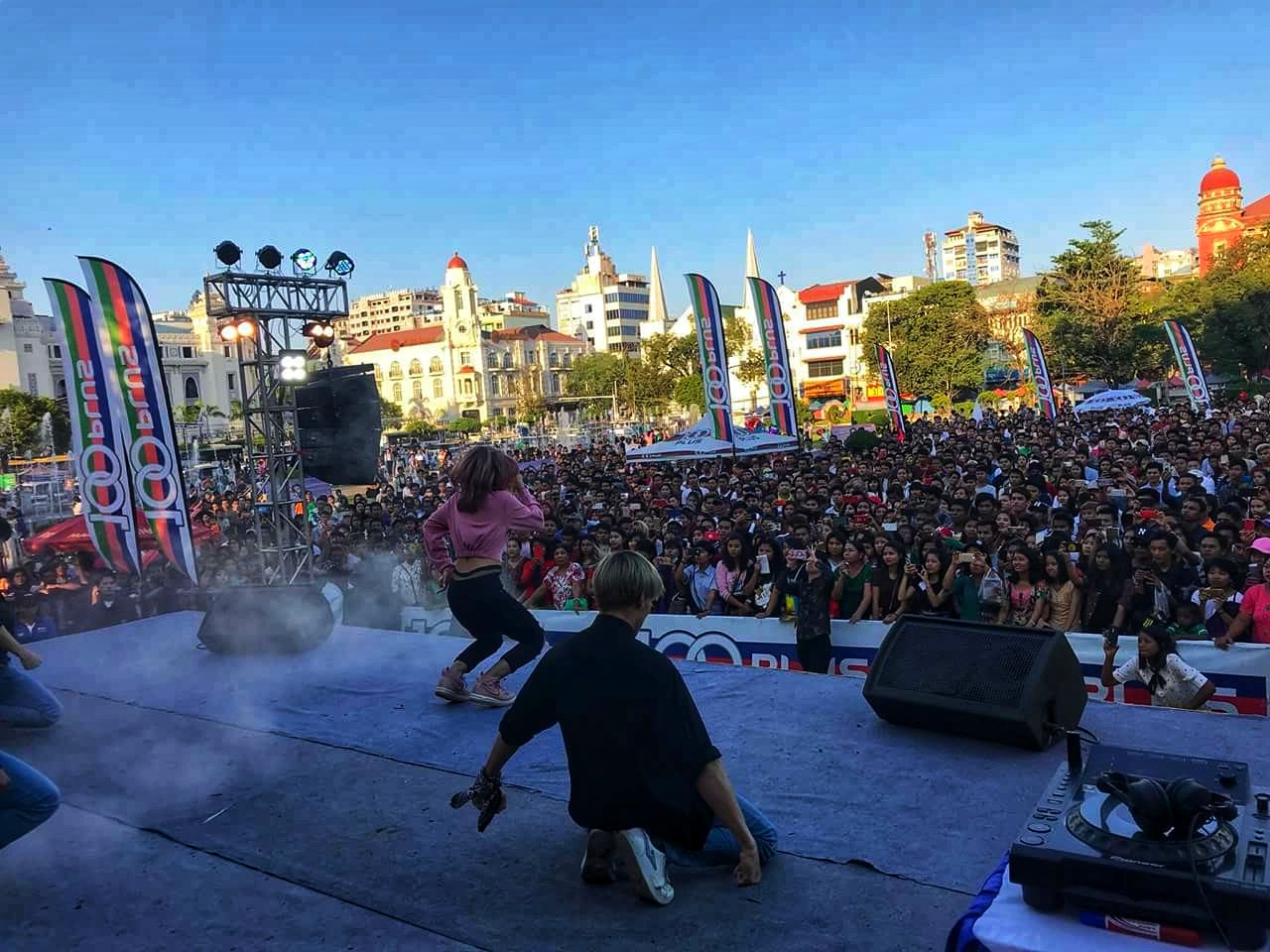
Sophia performing for her 2nd solo "Nin Yae album" release show

Everest started her music career as a contestant in the first season of Myanmar Idol, a televised singing competition. In the Myanmar Idol Top 5 finalists contest week, she competed with Saw Lah Htaw Wah, May Kyi, M Zaw Rain and Ninzi May, performing Saung Oo Hlaing's songs and was placed as 4th runner up. After she competed in Season 1 of Myanmar Idol, she engaged in shooting commercial advertisements, stage performances, and many concerts at various locations throughout Myanmar. She released her hit single "Crush On You" on 1 November 2016.

=== 2017–present: Solo debut and rising popularity ===
Everest launched her debut solo album "NVM" (Never Mind) on 26 February 2017. The album was listed No. 4 at "The best seller top 10 album of 2017". Her second solo album "Nint Yae" (နင့်ရဲ့), was released on 18 March 2018.

=== Awards and nominations ===
Artist	Award Ceremony	Year	Nominated Works	Category	Result
Sophia Everest	Major M Music Awards	2018	Nint Ye (နင့်ရဲ့)	Best R&B Album	Won
Sophia Everest & Sandy Myint Lwin	Major M Music Awards	2018	I.D.F.C	Best R&B Song	Won
Sophia Everest & Sandy Myint Lwin	Major M Music Awards	2018	I.D.F.C	Best Collaboration	Nominated
Sophia Everest, Double U & MHL	Major M Music Awards	2018	Can't Get It Back	Best Collaboration	Nominated
Sophia Everest	Major M Music Awards	2018	Nint Ye (နင့်ရဲ့)	Album Of The Year	Nominated
Sophia Everest, Double U & MHL	Major M Music Awards	2018	Can't Get It Back	Song Of The Year	Nominated
Sophia Everest, Raymond, Diramore, MØ & Diplo	Major M Music Awards	2019	Stay Open	Best Collaboration	Won
Sophia Everest	Major M Music Awards	2019	No Regret	Top Artist	Nominated
Sophia Everest	Major M Music Awards	2019	Medusa	Best R&B Performance	Nominated
Sophia Everest	Major M Music Awards	2020	Tell Me What To Do	Best R&B Performance	Nominated

== Acting career ==
=== 2017: Film debut ===
Sophia Everest made her film debut with a leading role in the film Naung Bal Tot Mha Ma Mone (Never Hate Again), alongside actress Hsu Eaint San and actor Thu Riya. The film was directed by Mae Min Bon, and film released in October 2017. She then starred in her second film Nauk Kyaw Ka Dar (Back Stab), where she played the leading role with Thu Riya and her fellow Myanmar Idol contestant May Kyi. The film released in November 2017.

== Brand ambassadorships ==
Sophia was appointed as brand ambassador of Tuborg on 26 February 2018.

== Filmography ==
=== Film ===
- Naung Bal Tot Mha Ma Mone (နောင်ဘယ်တော့မှမမုန်း) (2017)
- Nauk Kyaw Ka Dar (နောက်ကျောကဓား) (2017)

== Discography ==
=== Solo album ===
- NVM (Never Mind) (2017)
- Nint Yae (နင့်ရဲ့) (2018)

=== Singles ===
- Crush On You (2016)
- Mile Paung Kaday (မိုင်ပေါင်းကုဋေ) (2016)
- A Phyit Nae A Phyat (အဖြစ်နဲ့အပျက်) (2016)
- Chit Tar Ta Khu Tae Ti Tae (ချစ်တာတစ်ခုတည်းသိတယ်) (2016)
- Pyan Tar Pyan Par Shwe Hinthar (ပျံသာပျံပါရွှေဟင်္သာ) (2016)
- Ha Ha Ha! (2017)
- Ice (2017)
- Too Much (2017)
- Broken Mirror (2017)
- Nint Yae (နင့်ရဲ့) (2018)
- Yon Sayar Gyi (ရွံစရာကြီး) (2018)
- Poison (အဆိပ်) (2018)
- Way (ဝေး) (2018)
- I'm Fine (2018)
- Medusa (2019)
- No Regret (2019)
- Let's Go (2020)
- Tell Me What To Do (2020)
- Why (ဘာကြောင့်လဲ) (2020)
- Ice Cream (2020)
- Chit Khae Pee Pi (ချစ်ခဲ့ပြီးပြီ) (2020)
- Allergic (2020)
- Taurus (2023)

=== Collaboration songs ===
- Lights Down Low With H-rayz & Moe Htet (2016)
- AwAy With MHL (2016)
- A Lwan Tint Thu (အလွမ်းသင့်သူ) With Aung Pyae Phyo Kyaw (2016)
- Sunday (တနင်္ဂနွေ) With Saw Lah Htaw Wah (2016)
- Tha Nge (သူငယ်) With Ye Lay (2017)
- Snapshot (လျှပ်တပြက်) With X-BOX (2017)
- Tha Chin Ta Pote (သီချင်းတစ်ပုဒ်) With Ni Ni Khin Zaw (2017)
- I.D.F.C With Sandy Myint Lwin (2018)
- No Love With Rio (2018)
- Stay Open With Raymond, Diramore, MØ, Diplo (2018)
- $PO ($ပို) With Charlie (2018)
- Can't Get It Back With Double U & MHL (2018)
- Yar Yi (ယာယီ) With May Madi (2019)
- The Guest (ဧည့်သည်) With Nin Zi May (2019)
- That Thi Khel (သတ္တိခဲ) With Mi Sandi (2019)
- Lan Ka Lay (လမ်းကလေး) With Si Thu Lwin (2019)
- Yin Khone Yin A Chit (ရင်ခုန်ရင်အချစ်) With Si Thu Lwin (2019)
- Antidote With Mr.Y (2020)
- B.Barbie Remix Ep-6 With Ye Lay (2020)
- New Days With R Zar Ni, Yan Yan Chan (2020)
- Naing Ko Naing Ya Myi (နိုင်ကိုနိုင်ရမည်) With Key Lashi (2021)

=== OST songs ===
- A Sin Pyay Par Tal (အဆင်ပြေပါတယ်) (2019)
