= Thu Riya =

- သူရိယ
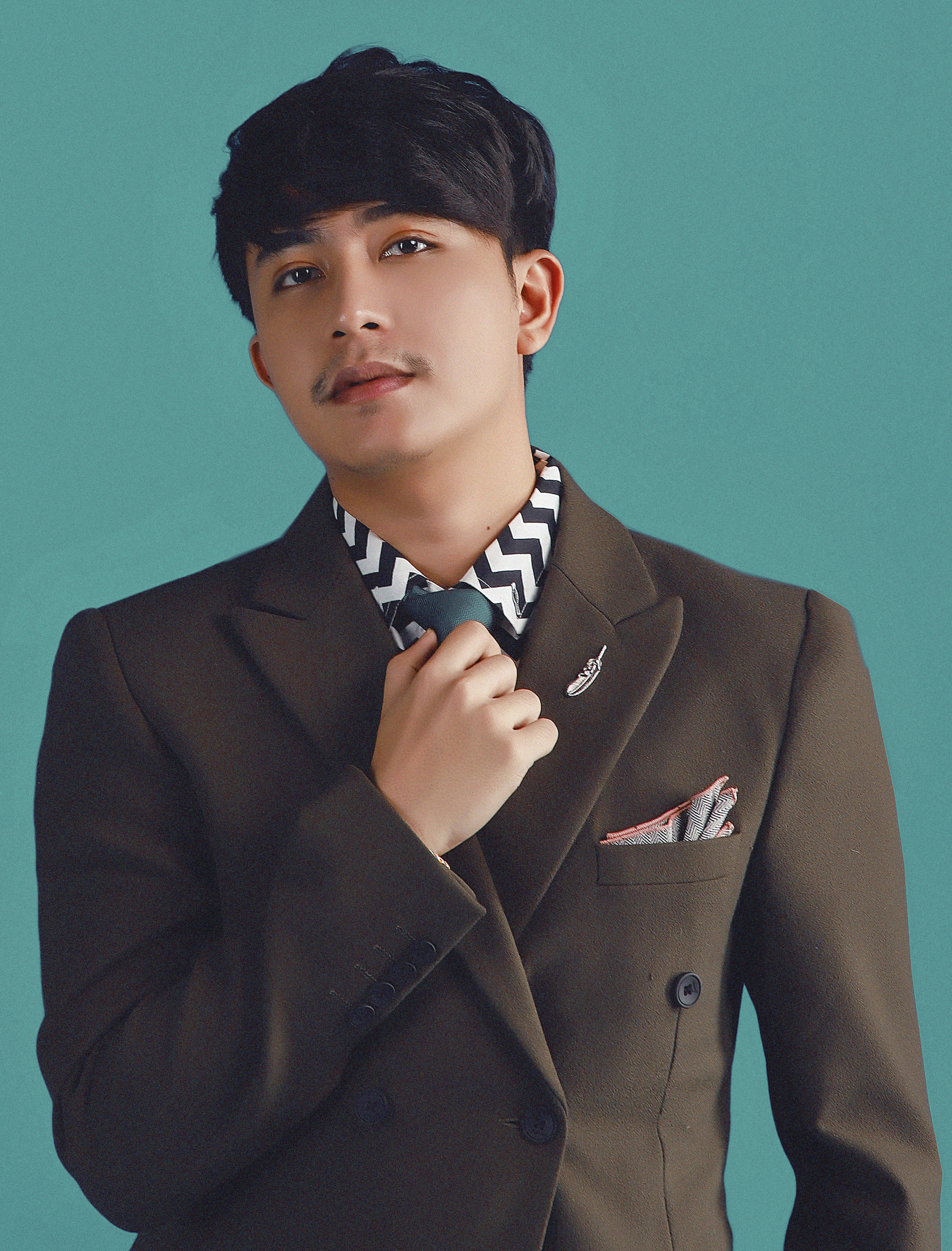
- Thu Riya in 2018
- Born: Thura Lynn; 6 May 1989 (age 37); Bago, Burma
- Education: Institute of Myanmar Traditional Medicine, Mandalay
- Occupations: Actor, Model, Television presenter
- Years active: 2009–present
- Height: 5 ft 6 in (1.68 m)
- Parent(s): Kyi Linn; Cho Cho Mar
- Relatives: Aung Thu Linn (brother); Chan Pyae Pyae Linn (brother); Khin Thitsa Kyi (sister)
- Website: thuriyaandhsueaintsan.com

Thu Riya (Burmese: သူရိယ; born Thura Lynn on 6 May 1989) is a Burmese actor, model, television presenter, and a comedian. He has starred in over 40 films in his acting career.

== Early life and education ==
Thuriya was born on 6 May 1989 in Bago, Bago Region, Myanmar. He is the eldest son of Kyi Linn and Cho Cho Mar, proprietors of Sein Bayek traditional medicine production. He is the eldest of four siblings, having two younger brothers, Aung Thu Linn and Chan Pyae Pyae Linn and a younger sister Khin Thissa Kyi.

Thuriya started his schooling at the Basic Education High School No. 3 Bago, till 9th grade and moved to Yangon to attend the Basic Education High School No. 1 Dagon. He then enrolled at the Institute of Myanmar Traditional Medicine, Mandalay in 2005 and graduated with a Dip.T.Med. in 2008 and then relocated to Yangon to help out in his parents’ family business.

== Career ==
=== Beginnings ===
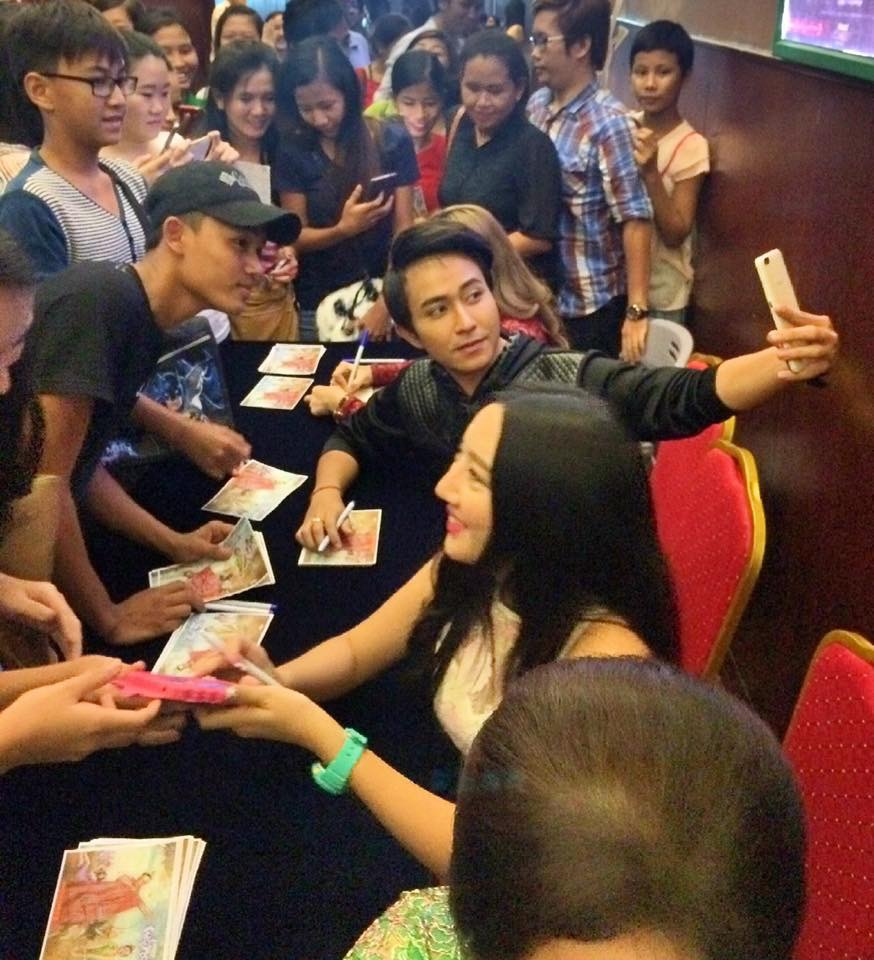
Thuriya at the cinema with fans

Thuriya's first appearance in television was in 1997, in the advertisement of his parents’ Sein Bayek traditional medicine house. He began his acting career as a child and performed in many Myanmar history films. Due to his schooling, he was not able to contribute fully in the acting career, but occasionally he participated in many entertainments of school concerts and educational films.

In 2009, permission was granted by his parents to enter into the field of acting, which is the focus of his life, since his childhood.

=== 2010–2013: Acting debut and breakthrough ===
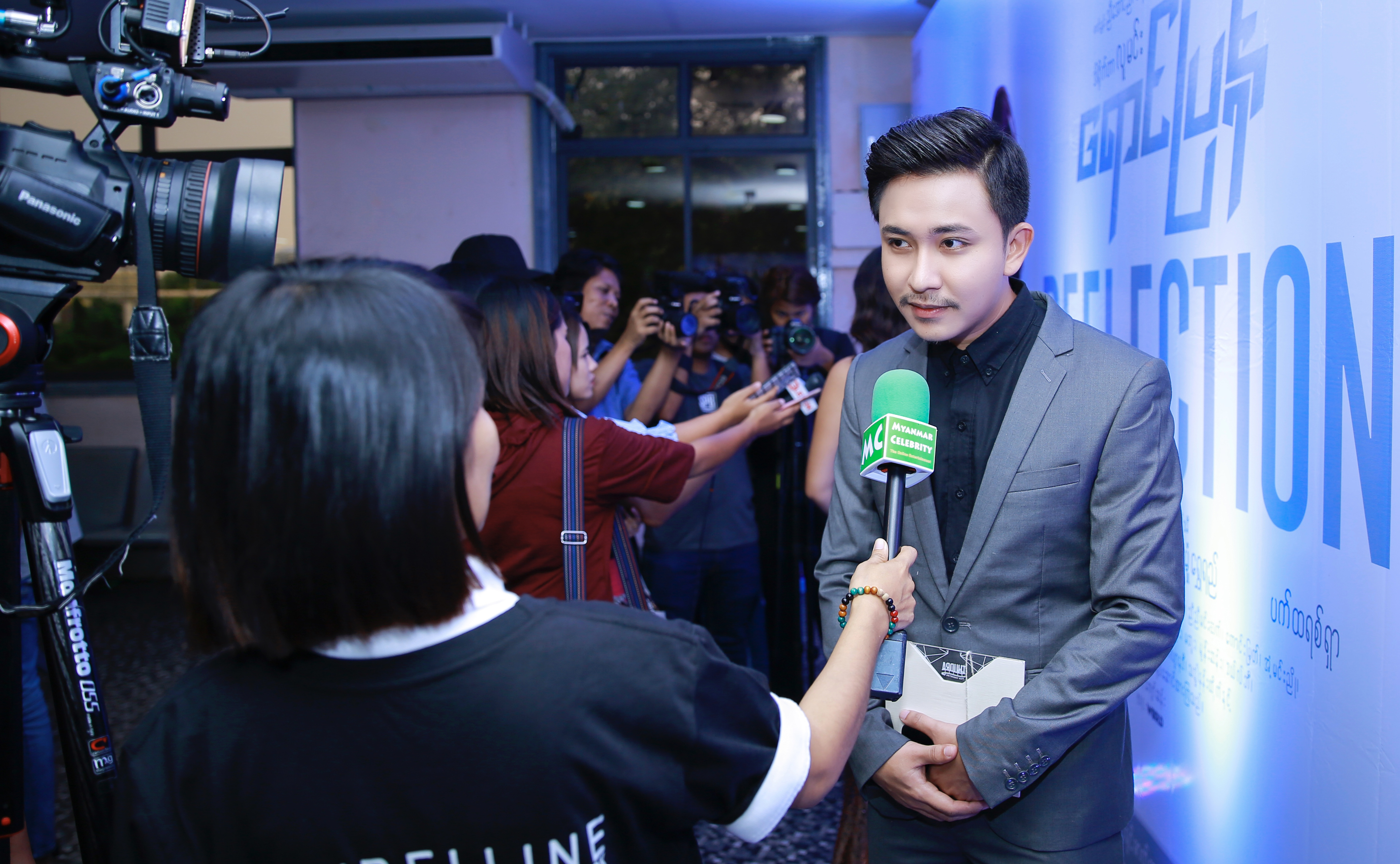
Thuriya at a media interview

Thuriya's acting debut was a supporting role in 2010 in Myawaddy TV’s short films. Through these experiences, he became connected with Myanmar films enterprise and performed in supporting roles in many films and soon gained recognition by the audiences. He also acted in some music videos.

In 2011, he entered into a five-year contract with Mahogany Film and Video Production and made his acting debut in the film A-Mi Me Tha (Motherless son) and changed his name from Thura Linn to Thuriya.

In 2013, Thuriya was in a dispute with Mahogany due to the very heavy indemnity, he was deterred from making any films or performing any acts with any other productions during the contract period with Mahogany film production. At that time, he was also not in good terms with his family and had disappeared from his home and the film industry for a period of two years.

=== 2016–present: Breaking into the big screen ===
In 2016, Thuriya starred in the Big screen feature film Facebook Ywa (Facebook Village). The film was produced by Aung Thiri Production, and screened in Myanmar cinemas in 2016, and was considered a big success, with full houses in the movie theatres.

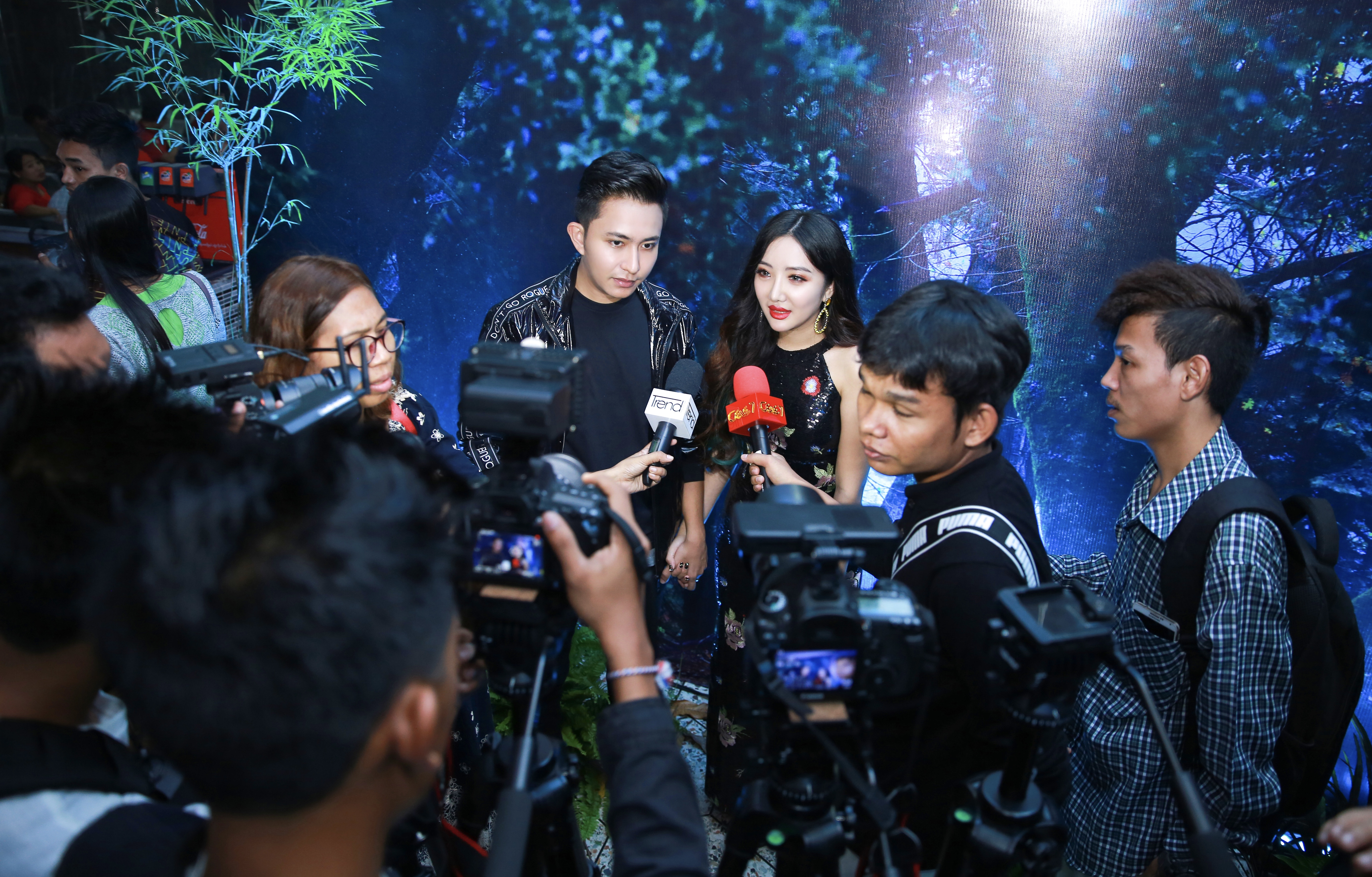
Thuriya and actress Hsu Eaint San at the movie press show

During 2016–2017, Thuriya was cast in TV series of MRTV-4, one of the Myanmar national TV stations. He was involved in Ma Nay Ka Phit Thi (It was on Yesterday) and Pyin Salat Ywar (Magic Village), produced by MRTV 4’s Taurus Production.

In 2018, the video markets crumpled, so he then again shifted back to the film industry. He has continued making films and these films will be released in 2019. He has been acting in three big screen films and over 40 direct-to-video films in his acting career.

== Changing appearance ==
In 2017, Thuriya underwent plastic surgery at DRK Beauty Clinic in Bangkok, Thailand, to reduce fat from his cheeks. His looks changed from puffy cheeks to V-shaped.

== Business ==
Thuriya is also a practitioner of Burmese traditional medicine. He owns Thuriya Myanmar Traditional Medicine, a producer of Burmese traditional medicine.

== Personal life ==
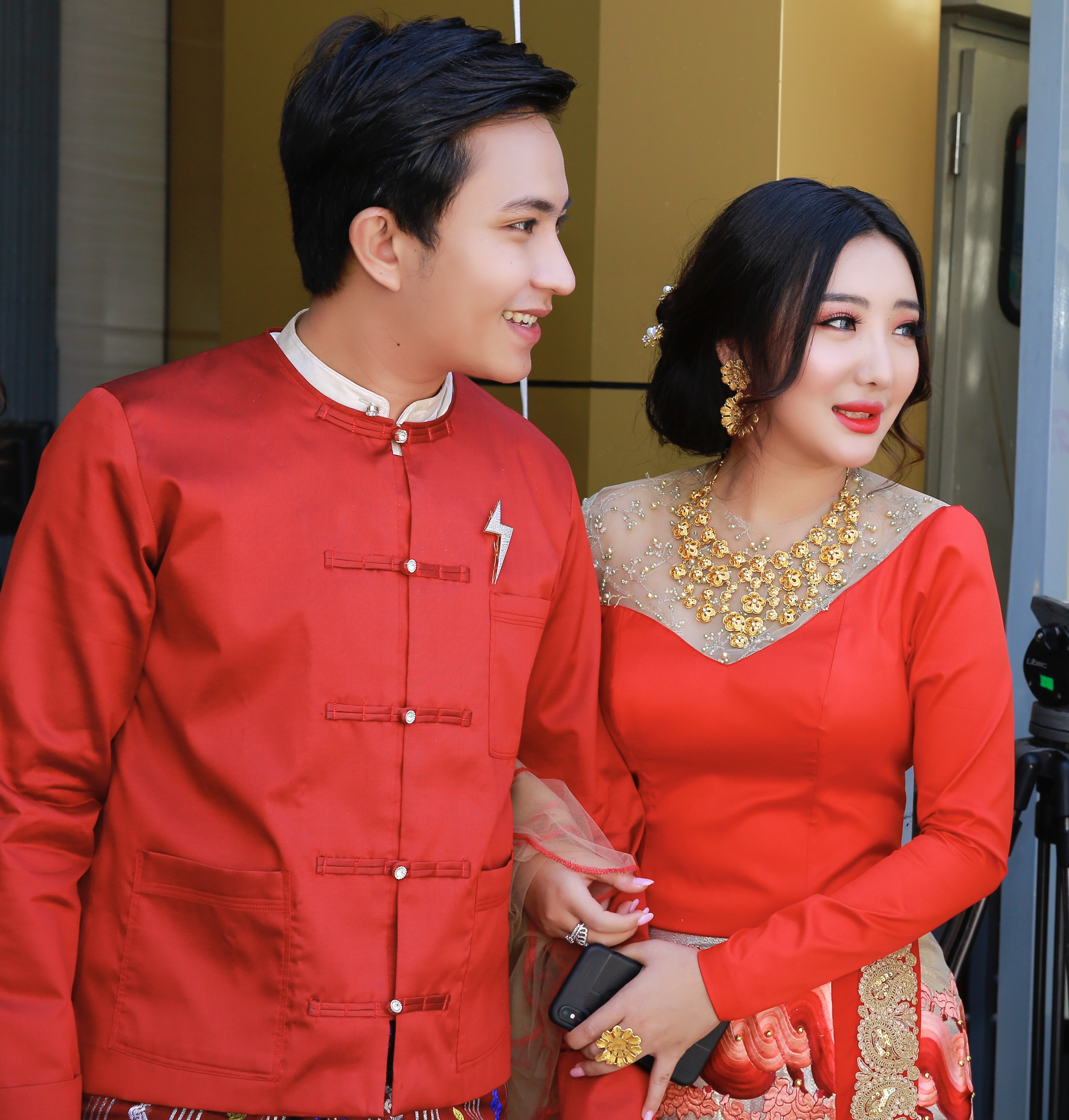
Thuriya and Hsu Eaint San

Thuriya relationship with actress Hsu Eaint San, who was a co-star on the film "Facebook Ywar", became a publicized topic in the Cele Cele Small Facebook page. After this news was released, they couple admitted to the public on their relationship had started on early 2017. In October 2019, they faced some problem and end their relationship.

Thuriya and Hsu Eaint San co-starred in many more films most notably Kya Phyu, Naung Be Daw Mha Ma Mohn, and Shin A-May Ne Kyaun-ma, as well as big screen films, Facebook Ywa, Nga Academy and Thaye Thinbaw.

== Filmography ==
=== Mahogany Videos Production (Direct-to-Videos) ===
Thuriya has starred in several direct-to-video films in association with Mahogany Videos Productions since 2011. The following is a partial list.

Lists of Videos
Video	Director	Co-Stars
A Mi Mae Thar	Mee Bwarr	Yan Aung, Soe Myat Thuzar, Myat Kaythi Aung, Thazin
528	Htun Aung Zaw	Htun Eaindra Bo, Thazin
100% Chit Thu	Sai Lon Kyaut	Khine Thin Kyi, Thazin
Triangle A Thwae Myar	Maung Pyae Wa	Moe Pyae Pyae Maung, Thazin
Way Hin Sanda Lay Myar	Ko Pauk	Min Oo, Soe Myat Thuzar, Htet Htet Htun
Ngyut Soe	Mee Bawrr	Soe Myat Thuzar, Sandi Myint Lwin
Myat Naphone Chit Thu	Aung Ba Power	Kyaw Kyaw Bo, Moe Moe, Soe Myat Nandar, Hla Asa Le Tin, Thazin
Thakhin	Win Htun Htun	Aye Thin Cho Swe
Kaung Chit Tae Ma Ma	Nay Paing	Soe Myat Nandar, Htet Htet Htun
Thone Kyo Thansin	Nay Paing	Soe Myat Thuzar, Htoo Mon, Thar Thar, Htet Htet Htun
Swal Htin Kyan Yat Thaw Myat Win Ta Ku	Zaw Myo Kayay Pone Pyin	Aye Myat Thu, Htet Htet Htun
Ah Thae Kyi Wutt Yi	Ko Zaw (Ar Yone Oo)	A Linn Yaung, Wutt Hmone Shwe Yi
Lane Mhr San Par Thar Yal	Ko Zaw (Ar Yone Oo)	Yan Aung, Htun Htun, Soe Myat Thuzar, May Kabyar, Thae Naw Zar
Shin Pya Ma Ya Tae Ayar	Ko Pauk	Khine Thin Kyi
Swal Sar Pyit Lite Tote	Ko Zaw (Ar Yone Oo)	Yan Aung, Paing Zay Ye Htun, A Linn Yaung, Soe Myat Thuzar, Chan Mei Mei Ko

=== Aung Thiri Videos Production (Direct-to-Videos) ===
Thuriya has been starring again in direct-to-videos with Aung Thiri Videos Production on 2015. Following are the lists of his works but it may not be the complete lists.

Lists of Videos
Video	Director	Co-Stars
Aww Kali San Boday Ah Mhan Nae Kaung Ma Lay	Pyaw Hein Thiha	Yu Thandar Tin
Naung Bal Tote Mha Ma Mone	Mal Min Bon	Hsu Eaint San, Sophia Everest
Shint A May Nae Kya Ma	Mal Min Bon	Khine Hnin Wai, Hsu Eaint San
Kya Taw Yesar Nainganchar Pyan	Yarsawin Ko	Thun Sett
Bwar Tae Kyar Aye	Yarsawin Ko	Thun Sett
Main Ma Nauk Poe	Nyunt Myanmar Nyi Nyi Aung	Ngwe Hmone Yati
Nauk Kyaw Ka Dar	Yarsawin Ko	May Kyi, Sophia Everest
Ywar Thar	Pyae Hein Thiha	Thun Sett
Yike Lite Par Own	Kyaw Zaww Linn	Patricia
Sa Yike	Pyae Hein Thiha	Yu Thandar Tin
Chit Thu Eaint Mat 16 Chat	Pyae Hein Thiha	Nan Hsu Oo

=== Films (Cinema) ===
Lists of Films
Year	Film	Director	Co-Stars
2016	Facebook Ywar	Yarsawin Ko	Kyaw Ye Aung, Lu Min, Khine Thin Kyi, Myat Kaythi Aung, Yu Thandar Tin, Hsu Eaint San
2017	Ngar Academy	Yarsawin Ko	Khant Sithu, Nyi Htut Khaung, Khine Thin Kyi, Shwe Hmone Yati, Hsu Eaint San
2019	Thayel Thinbaw	Yarsawin Ko	Khant Sithu, Nyi Htut Khaung, Khine Thin Kyi, Thun Sett, Hsu Eaint San

=== MRTV-4 Tarus V Production (Television series) ===
In 2016–2017, Thuriya began starring in a film series with the MRTV-4 Tarus V Production.

Year	English Title	Burmese Title	Director	Co-Stars	Role	Notes
2017	It was on Yesterday	မနေ့ကဖြစ်သည်	Aung Myat	A Linn Yaung, Phone Shein Khant, Aye Myat Thu, Yoon Yoon, Thiri Soe Moe	Oakkar	
2017	Magical Village	ပဉ္စလက်ရွာ	Thoe Saung	Aung Min Khant, Chue Lay, Nan Sandar Hla Htun	Elit	
2024	A Lwan Thint Hnin Si	အလွမ်းသင့်နှင်းဆီ	Mommy Thet	Shwe Kyo, Moe Pyae Thet Chal		
2026	Let Twel Phaw	လက်တွဲဖော်	Pwint Theingi Zaw	Shein Tin Htoo, Yadanar Bo, Ye Lwin Oo, Hnin Yu	Myat Min	
