= Myanmar Idol season 1 =

First season of Myanmar Idol

Myanmar Idol
- Season 1
- Hosted by: Kyaw Htet Aung
- Judges: May Sweet; Chan Chan; Ye Lay
- Winner: Saw Lah Htaw Wah
- Runners-up: Nin Zi May; M Zaw Rain
- Finals venue: Haxagon Complex
- Wild Card Winner: May Kyi

Release
- Original network: MNTV
- Original release: December 11, 2015 – April 8, 2016

Season chronology
- Next → Season 2

The first season of Myanmar Idol premiered on December 11, 2015, and continued until April 8, 2016. It was won by Saw Lah Htaw Wah. The first season was co-hosted by Kyaw Htet Aung, the latter of whom left the show after the season ended.

== Regional auditions ==
Auditions were held in Mandalay, Taunggyi, Mawlamyine, Pathein, and Yangon from October to November 2015, and around 10,000 attended the auditions.

Episode Air Date	Audition City	Date	Audition Venues	Golden Tickets
December 11, 2015	Mandalay	October 6–7, 2015	Swan Hotel	20
December 18, 2015	Taunggyi	October 13–14, 2015	Kyauk Taing Kwin	16
December 25, 2015	Mawlamyine	October 20–21, 2015	State Hall	12
January 1, 2016	Pathein	April 27–28, 2015	Pathein Hotel	14
January 8, 2016	Yangon	November 3–4, 2015	Shwe Htut Tin	24
Total Tickets to Golden Week				86

But three contestants didn't continue participate for family problem. So, only 83 contestants continue performed in Golden Week.

=== Structure of auditions ===
There are usually two stages in the audition process. In the first round they sing in front the executive producers and more are eliminated. In the second round those who survive the first stage sing in front of the judges and this is the audition shown on television. Those who gain at least two "yes" votes from the three judges then receive a golden ticket to Golden Week.

== Golden Week ==
It featured three rounds: Round 1, Group Round, and Solo Round. In the first round, each contestant sang individually, and after they sang, they gathered in a line. Those who impressed the judges advanced to the next round where the contestants performed in groups of four or five, singing a song together. The remaining auditionees who passed the group rounds performed their final solos to advance in the Green Mile.

=== Green Mile ===
Color key:

Female contestant
Male contestant
Contestant was chosen by the judges to move on to the Top 11
Contestant was eliminated

Order	Contestant	Age	Hometown	Audition city	Song	Result
1	Saw Lah Htaw Wah	24 (In that time)	Yangon	Yangon	"Not Important" (အရေးမကြီးဘူး)	Advanced
2	Nin Zi May	22 (In that time)	Yangon	Yangon	"Lann Kwae" (လမ်းခွဲ)	Advanced
3	Sophia Everest	23 (In that time)	Yangon	Yangon	"Ko A Nar Shi Say Chin" (ကိုယ့်အနားရှိစေချင်)	Advanced
4	M Zaw Rain	22 (In that time)	Pyinmana	Taunggyi	"December night" (ဒီဇင်ဘာည)	Advanced
5	Aung Ko Oo	20 (In that time)	Pantanaw	Yangon	"Koe A Nar Shi Say Chin" (ကိုယ့်အနားရှိစေချင်)	Eliminated
6	May Kyi	22 (In that time)	Lashio	Taunggyi	"Ta Kal So Yin A Chit Pe Lo Dal" (တကယ်ဆိုရင်အချစ်ပဲလိုတယ်)	Advanced
7	Aung Tay Zar Kyaw	22 (In that time)	Thanbyuzayat	Mawlamyine	"Na Lone Thway Myar Le Yat Tan Thwar Pa Say Chit Nay Mal" (နှလုံးသွေးများလည်းရပ်တန့်သွားပါစေချစ်နေမယ်)	Advanced
8	Jue Jue	21	Taunggyi	Taunggyi	"A Nee Sone Luu" (အနီးဆုံးလူ)	Eliminated
9	Lwan Daung	26	Kutkai	Mandalay	"December night" (ဒီဇင်ဘာည)	Eliminated
10	Khine Thazin Thin	22 (In that time)	Yangon	Yangon	"Chit Chin Ko Ma Khwae Par Nae" (ချစ်ခြင်းကိုမခွဲပါနဲ့)	Advanced
11	Thet Zaw	22 (In that time)	Yangon	Yangon	"Not Important" (အရေးမကြီးဘူး)	Eliminated
12	Thura Ko	21 (In that time)	Yangon	Yangon	"December night" (ဒီဇင်ဘာည)	Eliminated
13	Zaw Min Oo	N/A	Mandalay	Mandalay	"Na Lone Thway Myar Le Yat Tan Thwar Pa Say Chit Nay Mal" (နှလုံးသွေးများလည်းရပ်တန့်သွားပါစေချစ်နေမယ်)	Advanced
14	Wai Lin@Rio	26 (In that time)	Yangon	Yangon	"Bal Thu Ma" (ဘယ်သူမှ)	Advanced
15	Saw Htet Naing Soe	N/A	Taunggyi	Taunggyi	"December night" (ဒီဇင်ဘာည)	Advanced
16	Aung Pyae Htun	N/A	Pyin Oo Lwin	Mandalay	"Not Important" (အရေးမကြီးဘူး)	Advanced

== Top 11 Finalists and stages ==
Saw Lah Htaw Wah, Nin Zi May, M Zaw Rain, Saw Htet Naing Soe, Sophia Everest, Khine Thazin Thin, Zaw Min Oo, May Kyi, Aung Tay Zar Kyaw, Aung Pyae Htun, Rio

Color key:

Contestant got the highest public's votes
Contestant was saved by public's votes
Contestant was in the bottom three, but was saved by public's votes
Contestant got the elimination result, but was saved by Judges
Contestant was eliminated, but got a chance to return to competetation with Pantene wild card
Contestant was eliminated

=== Week 1: Top 11 – Contestants' Own Choice Songs ===
Order	Contestant	Song (Burmese name)	Result
1	M Zaw Rain	"Lann Kwe" (လမ်းခွဲ)	Safe And Highest Votes
2	Saw Htet Naing Soe	"Pyan Sone Mae Nay" (ပြန်ဆုံမယ့်နေ့)	Safe
3	Nin Zi May	"Guest" (ဧည့်သည်)	Safe
4	Wai Lin@Rio	"For Friend" (သူငယ်ချင်းအတွက်)	Eliminated
5	Aung Pyae Htun	"Dan Yar Haung Myar Nae Nya" (ဒဏ်ရာဟောင်းများနဲ့ည)	Safe
6	Khine Thazin Thin	"A Chit Mee" (အချစ်မီး)	Bottom 3
7	Saw Lah Htaw Wah	"Love is.." (အချစ်ဆိုသည်မှာ)	Safe
8	Sophia Everest	"Letter to Japan" (ဂျပန်ပြည်ကိုရေးတဲ့စာ)	Bottom 3
9	Aung Tay Zar Kyaw	"Imagnation house" (စိတ်ကူးယဉ်အိမ်)	Safe
10	May Kyi	"Girl Love" (မိန်းကလေးအချစ်)	Safe
11	Zaw Min Oo	"Kharr" (ခါး)	Safe

=== Week 2: Top 10 – 1980s ===
Order	Contestant	Song (Burmese name)	Result
1	Khine Thazin Thin	"Arr Lone A Yay Pyaw Twar Bi" (အားလုံးအရည်ပျော်သွားပြီ)	Bottom 3
2	May Kyi	"Ma Nae Maung" (မနဲ့မောင်)	Safe
3	Saw Lah Htaw Wah	"Ma Noe Par Say Nae Moe Ye" (မနိုးပါစေနဲ့မိုးရယ်)	Safe And Highest Votes
4	Aung Pyae Htun	"The Missing Paradise" (ပျောက်ဆုံးနေသောနိဗ္ဗာန်ဘုံ)	Eliminated
5	Zaw Min Oo	"Hate Eyes" (အမုန်းမျက်လုံး)	Safe
6	Nin Zi May	"Mu Yar Mar Yar Mone" (မူယာမာယာမုန်း)	Safe
7	M Zaw Rain	"Moe Sat Tin Lay" (မိုးစက်တင်လေ)	Safe
8	Aung Tay Zar Kyaw	"Strong Love" (အချစ်ရဲ့အားမာန်)	Safe
9	Sophia Everest	"Far Away" (ဝေးသက်ကွယ်လွန်ဝေး)	Bottom 3
10	Saw Htet Naing Soe	"Soe Sate Toe Tate Lwan Chain" (စိုးစိတ်တိုးတိတ်လွမ်းချိန်)	Safe

=== Week 3: Top 9–Hit songs ===
Sophia Everest was saved by judges. So there was no elimination in this week.

Order	Contestant	Song (Burmese name)	Result
1	Khine Thazin Thin	"ရွှေရောင်အိပ်မက်များ" (Shwe Young Eain Mat Myar)	Bottom 3
2	May Kyi	"မင်းရှိတဲ့မြို့" (Min Shi Tae Myo)	Safe
3	Saw Lah Htaw Wah	"အလွမ်းရဲ့ည" (A Lwan Yae Nya)	Safe And Highest Votes
4	Zaw Min Oo	"ဖြတ်" (Phat)	Safe
5	Nin Zi May	"တီအားမို" (Te Amo)	Safe
6	M Zaw Rain	"ပြန်လှည့်မကြည့်ဘူး" (Pyan Lae Ma Kyi Buu)	Safe
7	Aung Tay Zar Kyaw	"မျှော်လင့်နေမယ်" (Myaw Lint Nay Mal)	Bottom 3
8	Sophia Everest	"မြစ်နှစ်စင်းရဲ့ပင်လယ်" (Myit Na Sin Yae Pin Lae)	Eliminated But Saved By Judges
8	Saw Htet Naing Soe	"ရင်ခုန်ဘက်သို့တမ်းချင်း" (Yin Khone Bat Toe Tan Chin)	Safe

=== Week 4: Top 9 – Htoo Eain Thin's songs ===
Order	Contestant	Song (Burmese name)	Result
1	Khine Thazin Thin	"Nar Yi Paw Ma Myet Yay Sat Myar" (နာရီပေါ်မှမျက်ရည်စက်များ)	Eliminated
2	May Kyi	"Yat Sat Swar Pyone Tat Thaw" (ရက်စက်စွာပြုံးတတ်သော)	Safe
3	Saw Lah Htaw Wah	"I don't comeback" (ပြန်မလာတော့ဘူး)	Safe
4	Aung Tay Zar Kyaw	"Yarzawin Myar Ye Tha Toe Tha Mee" (ရာဇဝင်များရဲ့သတို့သမီး)	Eliminated
5	Zaw Min Oo	"Kindful Dream" (အကြင်နာအိပ်မက်)	Safe
6	Nin Zi May	"Sein Yat Lay Arr" (စိမ်းရက်လေအား)	Bottom 3
7	M Zaw Rain	"Lover's Gift" (ချစ်သူ့လက်ဆောင်)	Safe And Highest Votes
8	Sophia Everest	"A Khar Lwon Moe" (အခါလွန်မိုး)	Safe
9	Saw Htet Naing Soe	"A Lwan Ye Mee Lyan Myar" (အလွမ်းရဲ့မီးလျှံများ)	Safe

=== Week 5: Top 7 – Rock Music ===
Order	Contestant	Song (Burmese name)	Result
1	Saw Lah Htaw Wah	"Kyal Dway Kway Thwar Di Taing" (ကြယ်တွေကြွေသွားသည့်တိုင်)	Safe
2	May Kyi	"A Twin Kyay" (အတွင်းကြေ)	Eliminated
3	Sophia Everest	"First Prize" (ပထမဆု)	Bottom 3
4	M Zaw Rain	"85 Mandalay night longing" (၈၅ မန္တလေးညတမ်းချင်း)	Safe
5	Zaw Min Oo	"A Thone Ma Kya Tae Hnin Si" (အသုံးမကျတဲ့နှင်းဆီ)	Safe
6	Nin Zi May	"Cherry street" (ချယ်ရီလမ်း)	Safe And Highest Votes
7	Saw Htet Naing Soe	"Yarzawin" (ရာဇဝင်)	Bottom 3

=== Week 6: Top 6 – summer songs ===
Order	Contestant	Song (Burmese name)	Result
1	Saw Lah Htaw Wah	"Nway Oo Gan Gaw" (နွေဦးကံ့ကော်)	Bottom 3
2	Saw Htet Naing Soe	"Nway Mat Tan" (နွေမှတ်တမ်း)	Eliminated
3	Sophia Everest	"Ta Saint Saint Yin Htae" (တစိမ့်စိမ့်ရင်ထဲ)	Bottom 3
4	M Zaw Rain	"Yin Nar Dal April" (ရင်နာတယ်ဧပြီ)	Safe And Highest Vote
5	Zaw Min Oo	"A Tate Ye Nway" (အတိတ်ရဲ့နွေ)	Safe
6	Nin Zi May	"Nway Oo Pone Pyin" (နွေဦးပုံပြင်)	Safe

=== Week 7: Top 5+ Wild Card winner – Burmese Film theme songs ===
Order	Contestant	Song (Burmese name)	Result
1	Saw Lah Htaw Wah	"Pan Tway Nae Wai" (ပန်းတွေနဲ့ဝေ)	Safe And Highest Votes
2	Zaw Min Oo	"Na Yaut Ta Eain Mat" (နှစ်ယောက်တစ်အိပ်မက်)	Eliminated
3	Sophia Everest	"A Chit Thi Lay Pyae" (အချစ်သည်လေပြေ)	Bottom 3
4	M Zaw Rain	"Myint Mo Htet Myint Thaw" (မြင်းမိုရ်ထက်မြင့်သော)	Safe
5	May Kyi	"Rain in Inlay" (အင်းလေးမှာရွာတဲ့မိုး)	Safe (Pantene wild card winner)
6	Nin Zi May	"Heart City" (နှလုံးသားမြို့တော်)	Bottom 3

=== Week 8: Top 4+1 – Composer Saung Oo Hlaing's songs ===
Double eliminated because of previous week chose wild card winner.

Order	Contestant	Song (Burmese name)	Result
1	Saw Lah Htaw Wah	"Ta Ti Ya Pay Par" (သတိရပေးပါ)	Safe And Highest Votes
2	Sophia Everest	"A Chit Ma Shi Nay Yat Myar" (အချစ်မရှိနေ့ရက်များ)	Eliminated
3	May Kyi	"A Mar Myar" (အမှားများ)	Eliminated
4	M Zaw Rain	"Lae Sar Lite" (လှည့်စားလိုက်)	Safe
5	Nin Zi May	"Ta Khar Ka Lat Saung" (တစ်ခါကလက်ဆောင်)	Safe

=== Week 9: Finale ===
The Top three performed their winner’s song Judges chose song and contestants chose themselves song.

Contestant	Order	Contestant chose song (Burmese name)	Order	Winner song (Burmese name)	Order	Judges chose song (Burmese name)	Result
Nin Zi May	1	"Bal Thu Koe Lout Chit Tha Le" (ဘယ်သူကိုယ့်လောက်ချစ်သလဲ)	4	"Min Thi Naing Ma Lar" (မင်းသိနိုင်မလား)	7	"A Chit Htet Ma Ka" (အချစ်ထက်မက)	Runner-up
M Zaw Rain	2	"A Chit Oo Zat Lann" (အချစ်ဦးဇာတ်လမ်း)	5	"Min Thi Naing Ma Lar" (မင်းသိနိုင်မလား)	8	"Nout Sone Yin Khwin" (နောက်ဆုံးရင်ခွင်)	Runner-up
Saw Lah Htaw Wah	3	"Dan Yar Mae A Nar" (ဒဏ်ရာမဲ့အနာ)	6	"Min Thi Naing Ma Lar" (မင်းသိနိုင်မလား)	9	"Du Ta Ya" (ဒုတိယ)	Winner

=== Season 1: Group Songs ===
Group songs are performed by finalists at the beginning of the result show to entertain the audience every week.

Week Order	Finalists	Weeks	Song (Burmese name)
1	Top 11	Contestants' Own Choice Songs Week	"Pyaw Par Say Ta Nge Chin" (ပျော်ပါစေသူငယ်ချင်း)
2	Top 10	1980s Songs Week	"Say Soe Pan Yite Myat Nar" (ဆေးဆိုးပန်းရိုက်မျက်နှာ)
3	Top 9	Hit Songs Week	"Htar Wa Ya A Shone" (ထာဝရအရှုံး)
4	Top 9	Htoo Eain Thin's Songs Week	"Ta Nayt Tar A Lwe Myar" (တစ်နေ့တာအလွဲများ)
5	Top 7	Rock Songs Week	"A Thae Kwe Radio" (အသည်းကွဲရေဒီယို)
6	Top 6	Summer Songs Week	"Khwel Khwer Ya Mae Nway Yat Myar" (ခွဲခွာရမယ့်နွေရက်များ)
7	Top 5+1	Burmese Movies' Theme Songs Week	"Yin Khwin Nan Daw" (ရင်ခွင်နန်းတော်)
8	Top 5	Composer Saung Oo Hlaing's Songs Week	"Myaw Lint Chat Ta Sone Ta Yar" (မျှော်လင့်ချက်တစ်စုံတစ်ရာ)
9	Top 3	Grand Final Week	"Pyaw Par Say Ta Nge Chin" (ပျော်ပါစေသူငယ်ချင်း)

=== Season 1: Guest Singers' Songs ===
Guest singers performed in the middle of the result show every week.

Week Order	Finalists	Weeks	Guest Singers	Song (Burmese name)
1	Top 11	Contestants' Own Choice Songs Week	Moe Moe	"Chit Tal Dot Ma Hote I Love You" (ချစ်တယ် သို့မဟုတ် I Love You)
2	Top 10	1980s Songs Week	Eaint Chit	"Chit Lite Par Taut" (ချစ်လိုက်ပါတော့)
3	Top 9	Hit Songs Week	Tin Zar Maw	"Pa Hta Ma Chay Lan" (ပထမခြေလှမ်း)
4	Top 9	Htoo Eain Thin's Songs Week	Si Thu Lwin	"A Mae Yé Dote Kha Oh Lay" (အမေ့ရဲ့ဒုက္ခအိုးလေး)
5	Top 7	Rock Songs Week	Sone Thin Par	"Tate Paing Tae Min" (သိပ်ပိုင်တဲ့မင်း)
6	Top 6	Summer Songs Week	Victor Khin Nyo	"Summer" (နွေ)
7	Top 5+1	Burmese Movies' Theme Songs Week	Yan Aung	"Bae Pa Chi Yay Loh Ma Mi" (ဘယ်ပန်းချီရေးလို့မမှီ)
9	Top 3	Grand Final Week	Zaw Win Htut	"Myaw Lint Chat Kan Chay" (မျှော်လင့်ချက်ကမ်းခြေ), "A Sone" (အဆုံး), "Khwe Khwar" (ခွဲခွာ)
9	Top 3	Grand Final Week	Phyu Phyu Kyaw Thein	"April Fool" (ဧပရယ်ဖူးလ်), "Water Party Yay Party" (ဝါးတားပါတီ ရေပါတီ), "The Illusion" (လှည့်စားလိုက်)
9	Top 3	Grand Final Week	May Sweet (Judge)	"Jackson Htake Ka La Yate Pyar" (ဂျပ်ဆင်ထိပ်က လရိပ်ပြာ)
9	Top 3	Grand Final Week	Chan Chan (Judge)	"Chit Khae Mi Tar" (ချစ်ခဲ့မိတာ)
9	Top 3	Grand Final Week	Yé Lay (Judge)	"A Nar Nar Shi Tae A Khite" (အနားနားရှိတဲ့အခိုက်), "Pa Hta Ma A Nan Go" (ပထမအနမ်းကို)

=== Grand Final Eliminated Contestants' Guest Performances ===
Contestants performed as guest singers in the grand final.

Placement	Contestants	Song (Burmese name)
Top 40	Soe With Than	"Pa Hta Ma A Nan Go" (ပထမအနမ်းကို)
11th	Rio (Wai Lin)	"Way Lwint Twar Tae Eain Mat" (ဝေးလွင့်သွားတဲ့ အိပ်မက်)
10th	Aung Pyae Htun	"Mone Lite" (မုန်းလိုက်)
9th	Khine Thazin Thin	"Miles Paund Kaday" (မိုင်ပေါင်းကုဋေ)
8th	Aung Tay Zar Kyaw	"Hnin Sate Tine Kya" (နင်စိတ်တိုင်းကျ)
7th	Saw Htet Naing Soe	"Kyo Nay Say Chin Tal" (ကြိုနေစေချင်တယ်)
6th	Zaw Min Oo	"Di Yay Di Lay" (ဒီရေဒီလှေ)
5th	May Kyi	"Lan Ma Gyi Yé Bay" (လမ်းမကြီးရဲ့ဘေး)
4th	Sophia Everest	"Sone Ma" (စုန်းမ)

== Elimination Chart ==
Order	Contestant	Top 11	Top 10	Top 9	Top 9	Top 7	Top 6	Top 5+1	Top 5	Finale Top 3
1	Saw Lah Htaw Wah	Safe	Highest Votes	Highest Votes	Safe	Safe	Bottom 3	Highest Votes	Highest Votes	Winner
2	M Zaw Rain	Highest Votes	Safe	Safe	Highest Votes	Safe	Highest Votes	Safe	Safe	1st Runner-up
3	Nin Zi May	Safe	Safe	Safe	Bottom 3	Highest Votes	Safe	Bottom 3	Safe	2nd Runner-up
4	Sophia Everest	Bottom 3	Bottom 3	Saved by judges	Safe	Bottom 3	Bottom 3	Bottom 3	Eliminated	
5	May Kyi	Safe	Safe	Safe	Safe	Eliminated		Returned by Wild Card and Safe	Eliminated	
6	Zaw Min Oo	Safe	Safe	Safe	Safe	Safe	Safe	Eliminated		
7	Saw Htet Naing Soe	Safe	Safe	Safe	Safe	Bottom 3	Eliminated			
8	Aung Tay Zar Kyaw	Safe	Safe	Bottom 3	Eliminated					
9	Khine Thazin Thin	Bottom 3	Bottom 3	Bottom 3	Eliminated					
10	Aung Pyae Htun	Safe	Eliminated							
11	Rio (Wai Lin)	Eliminated								
