= Hsu Eaint San =

Burmese actress

- ဆုအိမ့်စံ
- Born: Hsu Myat Thin; March 22, 1994 (age 32); Hpakant, Kachin State, Myanmar
- Other name: Hsu Hsu
- Education: Dagon University
- Occupations: Actress, Model
- Years active: 2015–present
- Height: 5 ft 4 in (1.63 m)
- Parent(s): Tun Aung Kyi; Yin Yin Thaung

Hsu Eaint San (Burmese: ဆုအိမ့်စံ; born Hsu Myat Thin on 22 March 1994) is a Burmese actress and commercial model. She is best known for her leading roles in several Burmese films. Throughout her career, she has acted in over 40 films.

== Early life and education ==
Hsu was born on 22 March 1994 in Hpakant, Kachin State, Myanmar to parents Tun Aung Kyi, a jade trader and his wife Yin Yin Thaung, who was of Kachin-Rakhine descent. She is the third daughter of five siblings. Hsu moved to Yangon from Hpakant with her family in 2007. She attended high school at Basic Education High School No. 1 Dagon. She studied botany at the distance education of Dagon University.

== Career ==
=== 2015–2016: Acting debut and recognition ===
Hsu officially entered the film industry in 2015 with the film Sate Naung Kyoe (Mind Bond) playing the leading role with Lu Min. She then starred in film Ywar Ko Pyan Kae Arr Luu (Come back to the village, Arr Luu) where she played the main role with Nyi Htut Khaung and Thun Sett in 2016. The film was a domestic hit, and led to increased recognition for Hsu Eaint San.

=== 2016–present: Breaking into the big screen ===
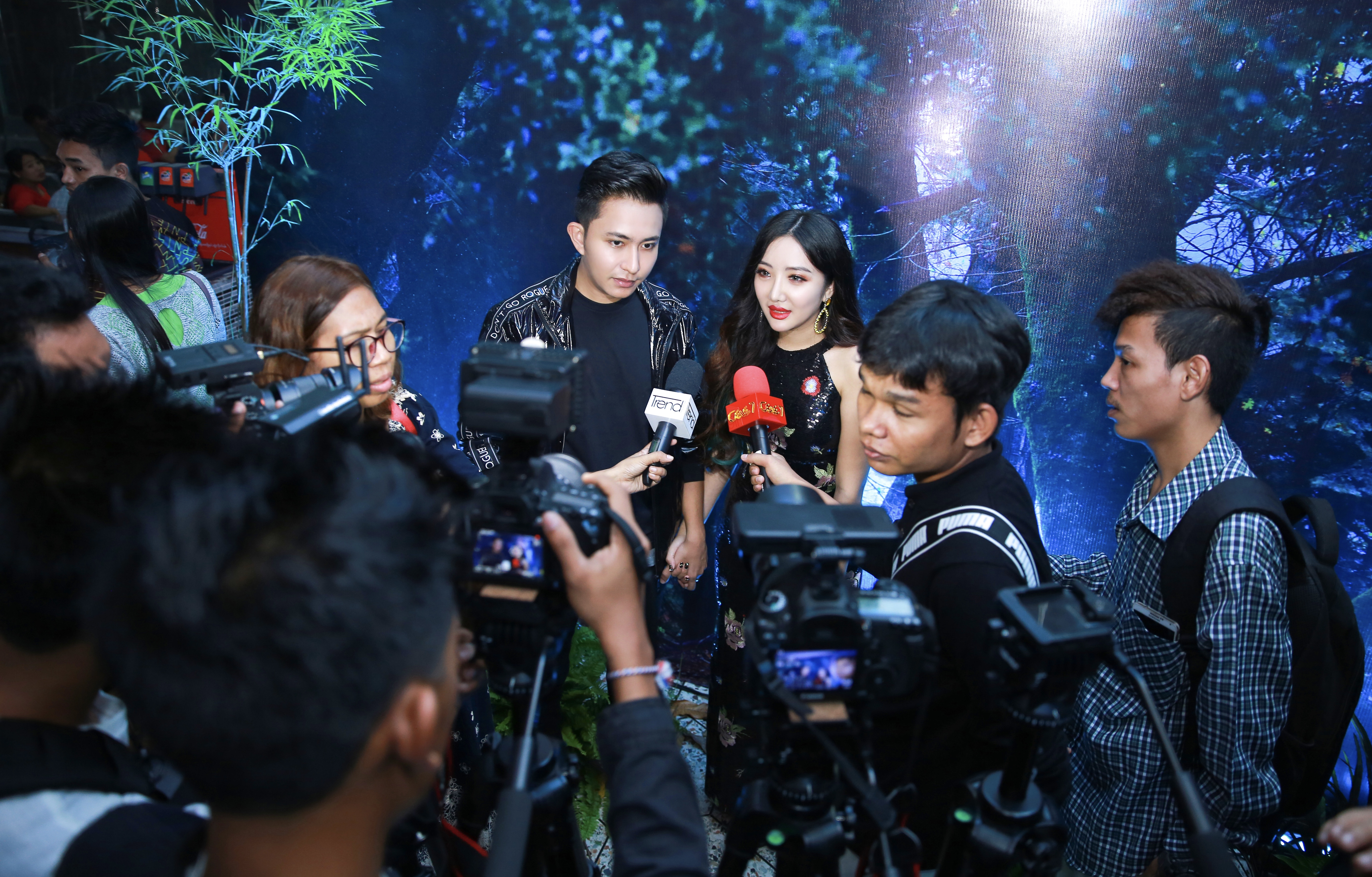
Hsu Eaint San and actor Thu Riya at the movie press show

In 2016, she took on her first big-screen main role in the comedy-drama film Facebook Ywar (Facebook Village), alongside Lu Min, Khine Thin Kyi and Yu Thandar Tin. The film was popular in Myanmar and which premiered in Myanmar cinemas in 2016 stayed in local theaters for a record five weeks.

In 2016, she portrayed her role as Mal Mal Pwa in the popular big-screen film Nga Academy (My Academy) which premiered in Myanmar cinemas on 10 March 2017. In 2017, she starred in the big-screen film Facebook Ywar 2 (Facebook Village 2), will be showing in Myanmar cinemas on next year.

In 2018, she starred in the comedy film Baw Baw Ka Htaw, playing her role as Moe Swe alongside Myint Myat, Shwe Thamee and Mone which premiered in Myanmar cinemas on 13 July 2018. The film which was a huge commercial hit slot nationally and becoming the most watched film at that time. Hsu's portrayal of the character earned praised by fans for her acting performance and character interpretation, and experienced a resurgence of popularity. The same year, she starred in the big-screen film Thaye Thinbaw (Ghost Ship) where she played the main role with co-stars Khant Si Thu, Thu Riya, Khine Thin Kyi and Yu Thandar Tin which premiered in Myanmar cinemas on 18 January 2019. From 2015 to present, she has acted in over 40 films and 6 big screen films.

== Political activities ==
Following the 2021 Myanmar coup d'état, Hsu Eaint San was active in the anti-coup movement both in person at rallies and through social media. Denouncing the military coup, she has taken part in protests since February. She joined the "We Want Justice" three-finger salute movement. The movement was launched on social media, and many celebrities have joined the movement.

On 5 April 2021, warrants for her arrest were issued under section 505 (a) of the penal code by the State Administration Council for speaking out against the military coup. Along with several other celebrities, she was charged with calling for participation in the Civil Disobedience Movement (CDM) and damaging the state's ability to govern, with supporting the Committee Representing Pyidaungsu Hluttaw, and with generally inciting the people to disturb the peace and stability of the nation.

== Personal life ==
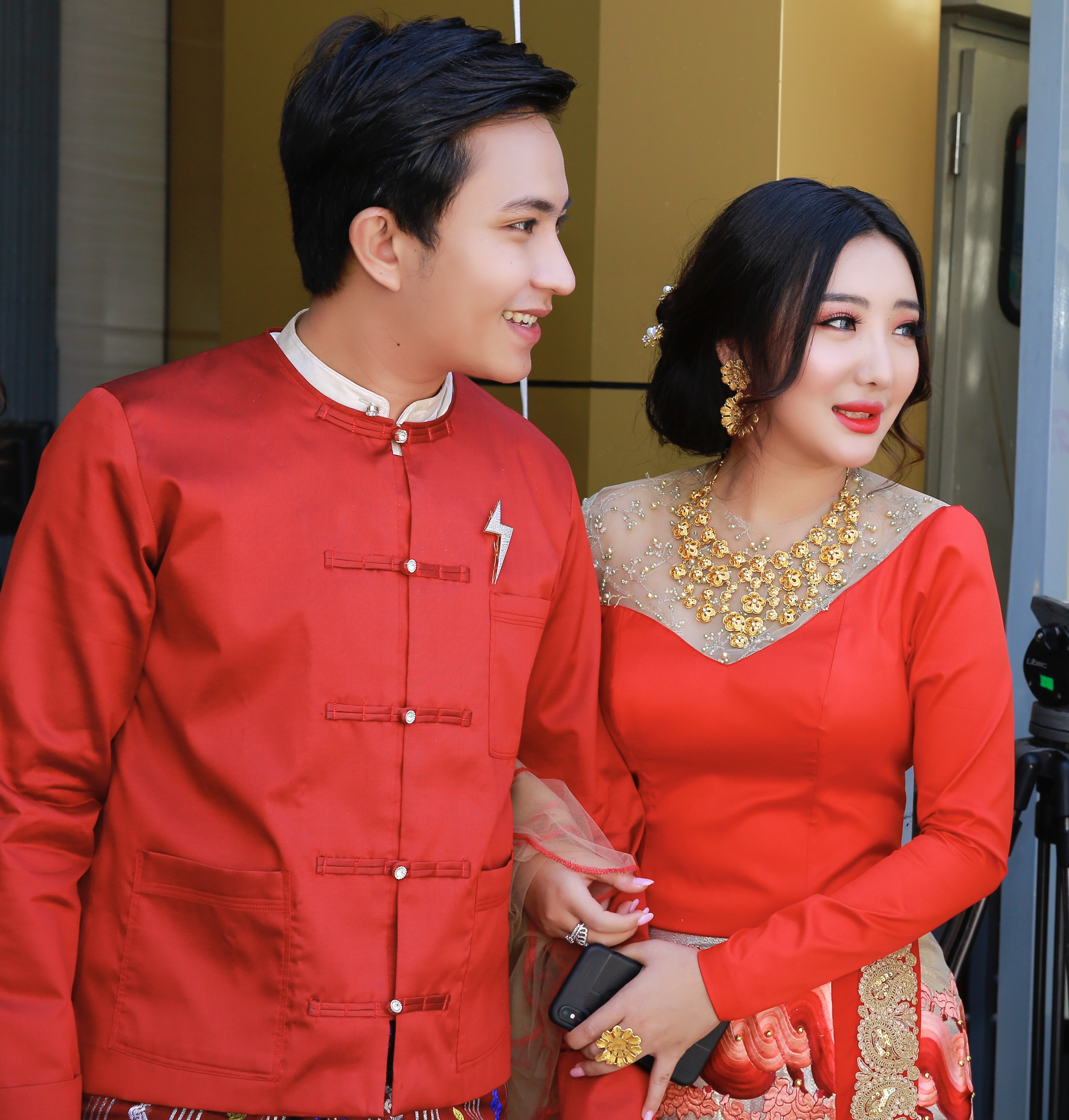
Thu Riya and Hsu Eaint San

Hsu relationship with actor Thu Riya, who was a co-star on the film Facebook Ywar (Facebook Village), became a publicized topic in the "Cele Cele Small" Facebook page. After this news was released, they couple admitted to the public on their relationship had started on early 2017. Hsu Eaint San and Thu Riya co-starred in many more films most notably Kyar Phyu, Naung Bal Tote Mha Ma Mone, and Shin A May Nae Kyaunt Ma, as well as big screen films, Facebook Ywar, Nga Academy and Thaye Thinbaw. In October 2019, they faced some problem and end their relationship.

== Filmography ==
=== Film (Cinema) ===
List of films
Year	Title	Director	Co-Stars	Role
2016	Facebook Ywar	Yazawin Ko	Lu Min, Thu Riya, Khine Thin Kyi, Yu Thandar Tin	?
2017	Ngar Academy	Yarzawin Ko	Khant Sithu, Thu Riya, Nyi Htut Kung, Khine Thin Kyi, Shwe Hmone Yati	Mei Mei Pwa
2018	Baw Baw Ka Htaw	Ko Pauk	Myint Myat, Khin Hlaing, Jocker, Shwe Thamee	Moe Swe
2019	Thayel Thinbaw	Yarzawin Ko	Khant Sithu, Thu Riya, Nyi Htut Kung, Khine Thin Kyi, Thun Sett	Thway Thway

=== Film ===
Over 40 films, including

- Sate Naung Kyoe (စိတ်နှောင်ကြိုး) (2015)
- Ywar Ko Pyan Kae Arr Luu (ရွာကိုပြန်ခဲ့ အာလူး) (2016)
- Naung Bal Tote Mha Ma Mone (နောင်ဘယ်တော့မှမမုန်း) (2017)
- Kyar Phyu (ကြာဖြူ) (2018)
- Shin A May Nae Kyaunt Ma (ရှင့်အမေနဲ့ကျွန်မ) (2018)

=== Television series ===
- Laung (လောင်) (2023)
