= Kyaw Htet Aung =

Burmese television host, MC, actor and model

- ကျော်ထက်အောင်
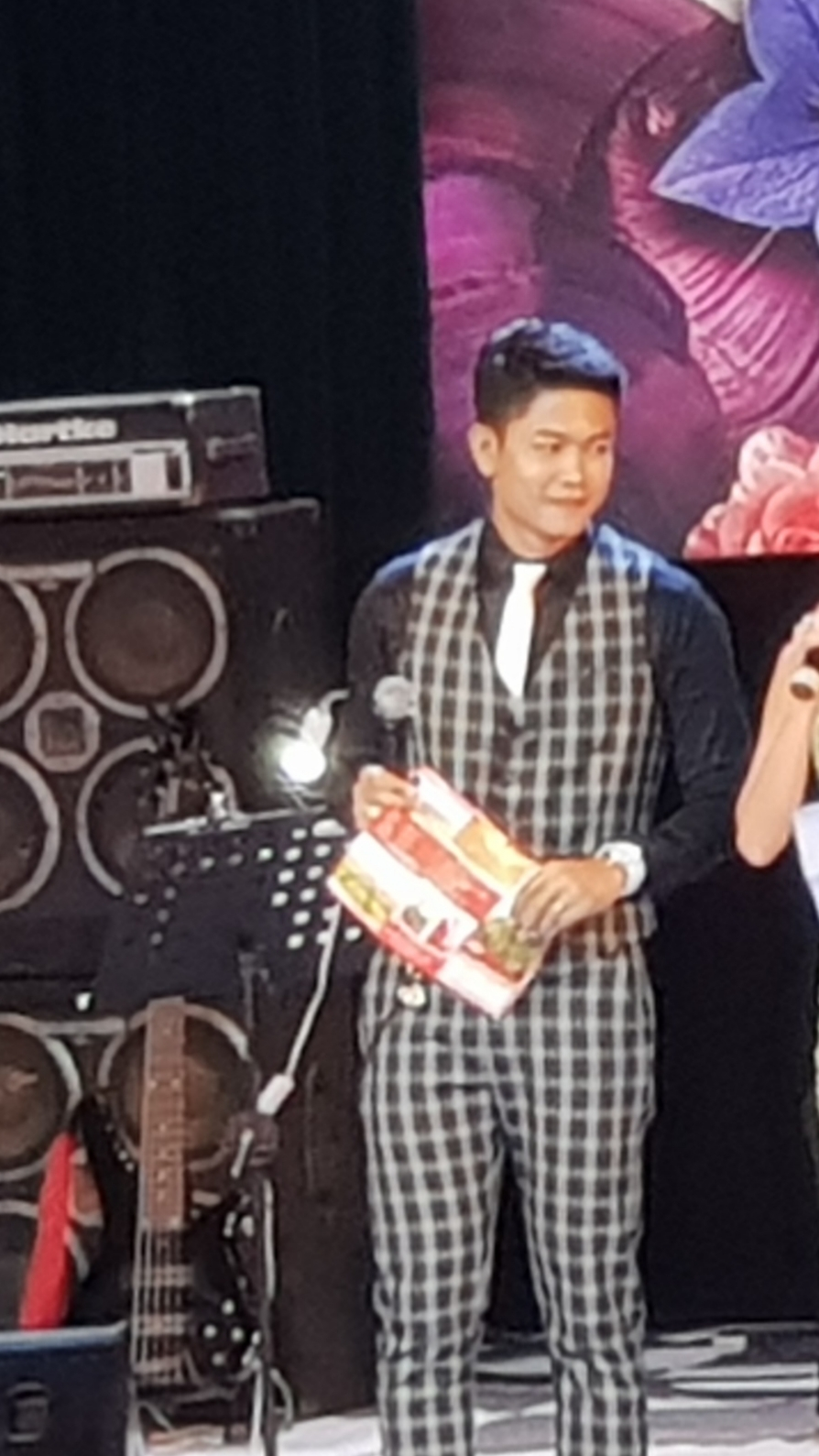
- Born: 14 September 1985 (age 40); Rangoon, Burma
- Education: East Yangon University
- Occupations: Actor; Model; Television Host
- Years active: 2007-present (presenter, MC); 2016-present (acting)
- Parent(s): Win Lwin; Myint Myint Oo
- Website: www.kyawhtetaung.com

Kyaw Htet Aung (Burmese: ကျော်ထက်အောင်; born 14 September 1985) is a Burmese television host, MC, actor and model. He is best known for hosting in the televised singing competition show Myanmar Idol, which propelled him to fame in Myanmar.

== Early life and education ==
Kyaw Htet Aung was born on 14 September 1985 in Yangon, Myanmar to parent Win Lwin and Myint Myint Oo. He graduated from East Yangon University. He studied acting at Talents & Models Agency in 2000.

== Career ==
=== MC and host ===
Kyaw began his career as a presenter in 2007. He is the second generation of the young TV presenters and worked as a host for Family Entertainment from 2010 to 2014. After that, he started as a freelance model and MC. He has been a TV host for many talk show programs and received acceptance of audience for famous reality show Myanmar Idol. He served as the TV host for Myanmar Motion Picture Academy Awards Ceremony in 2016 and 2017 and also hosted the Miss Universe Myanmar 2018.

=== Acting career ===
Kyaw entered the entertainment industry, he has been practicing dance choreography on a regular basis. He is set to star in a short film project, sponsored by Myanmar Brewery. As he would play the role of a dancer for the first time, he is now practicing dance moves with the Secret Pieces Dance Crew. Rising to fame in 2016, he became a professional actor. He made his acting debut with a supporting role in 2016 big screen film Kyat Gu (Coffin Cave), directed by Lu Min, which screened in Myanmar cinemas in 2018. Soon after, he signed under Aung Khit Minn Film Production.

Later, he took on his first big-screen lead role in the drama film Thu Nge, alongside Yan Aung, Ye Aung, Min Oo, Soe Myat Thuzar, Htun Eaindra Bo, Khine Thin Kyi and Mari Ko, directed by Arr Yone Oo Pwint Thingi Zaw, and which screened in Myanmar cinemas on 23 June 2017. The same year, he portrayed his role as Nyein Chan in his 2nd big-screen film Nay Chi Mhar Shwe Yi Laung, where he played the leading role with Aye Myat Thu and Nan Myat Phyo Than, directed by Zaw Myint Oo, and which screened in Myanmar cinemas on 15 September 2017. The film was nominated "Best Actor" for Kyaw Htet Aung at the Myanmar Academy Awards 2017.

In 2018, Kyaw portrayed the military doctor in the military figures series Sit Ko Mone Ywae Tite Khae Ti, was base on the true story and which aired on Myawaddy Channel on 25 March 2018. In the same year, he starred the leading role in big-screen film Za Yike, alongside Lu Min, Khine Thin Kyi and Htun Eaindra Bo, which screened in Myanmar cinemas on 30 May 2019. He then starred in the big-screen film Carbon Dioxide, alongside A Linn Yaung, Phway Phway and Yadabar Bo, directed by Wyne, which screened in Myanmar cinemas on 27 July 2018.

He also starred in the big-screen film Chu Si, where he played the leading role with Melody, Ei Chaw Po, Aye Myat Thu, May and Nan Su Oo, which premiered in Myanmar cinemas on 14 September 2018. He was cast in the big-screen film The Masks on 6 May 2018.

=== Brand ambassadorships ===
Kyaw Htet Aung was appointed as brand ambassador for Red Bull and Nescafé in 2017 and also brand ambassador of Nutrivita in 2018.

== Filmography ==
=== Film (cinema) ===
Lists of Films
Year	Film	Director	Co-Stars	Role	Notes
2017	Thu Ngal	Ar Yone Oo Pwint Thingi Zaw	Yan Aung, Ye Aung, Min Oo, Soe Myat Thuzar, Htun Eaindra Bo, Khine Thin Kyi, Mari Ko	Shane	
2017	Nay Chi Mhar Shwe Yi Laung	Zaw Myint Oo	Aye Myat Thu, Kyaw Kyaw, Nann Myat Phyo Thin	Nyein Chan	Nominated - Academy Award for Best Actor
2018	Sit Ko Mone Ywae Tite Khae Ti	Tin Aung Soe (Pan Myo Taw)	Htoo Aung, Nay Min, Ei Chaw Po, Soe Myat Thuzar, Soe Myat Nandar, Soe Pyae Thazin, Thun Sett	Htet Aung (Military doctor)	
2018	CO2	Wyne	A Linn Yaung, Phway Phway, Yadanar Bo	Arkar Soe Moe	
2018	Chu Si	Academy Min Oo	Melody, Aye Myat Thu, Ei Chaw Po, May, Nann Su Oo	Lin Oo Maung	
2018	The Masks	Academy Min Oo	Min Oo, Ei Chaw Po, Aye Wutyi Thaung, Soe Pyae Thazin	?	
2018	Kyat Gu	Lu Min (actor)	Myint Myat, Lu Min (actor), Htun Eaindra Bo, Eaindra Kyaw Zin	Saw Wai Oo (school teacher)	supporting role
2018	Gandawin Anhyo	Aung Zaw Lin	Min Oo, Min Paing, Myat Kaythi Aung, Paing Phyo Thu, Melody	Thwin Htoo Aung	
2019	Sa Yite	Aww Yatha	Lu Min (actor), Khine Thin Kyi, Htun Eaindra Bo	Tin Maung Win	
2019	A Flower Above The Clouds	Sin Yaw Mg Mg	Ryu Sang Wook, Wutt Hmone Shwe Yi, May Than Nu	Htan	
2021	What Happened to the Wolf?	Na Gyi	Eaindra Kyaw Zin, Paing Phyo Thu, Lwin Moe, Aung Myint Myat	Min Han	
2024	Ta Khote Ta Ya	Wyne	Moe Hay Ko, Htet Htet Htun		

=== Television series ===
Lists of Series
Year	Series	Director	Co-Stars	Role	Channel	Note
2022	Nya Hwet Pan	Thein Han (Phoenix)	Yadanar Bo, Thoon Thet Htoo San		Mahar	
2022	Mone Tine Athinchay	Nay Paing	Chaw Yadanar, Cindy Myat		Channel K	
2023	The Marriage	Mae Min Bon	Nyi Htut Khaung, Banyar Phone Pyae, Chaw Yadanar, Yadanar Bo, Htet Htet Htun, May Toe Khine, Thin Thae Bo	Eant Htoo Htet	Mahar	

== Awards and nominations ==
Year	Award	Category	Nominated work	Result
2017	Myanmar Academy Award	Best Actor	Nay Chi Hmar Shwe Yi Laung	Nominated
