= Nyit Toon =

Burmese Film

- Film Poster
- Burmese: ညစ်တွန်း
- Directed by: Lu Min
- Screenplay by: Min Khite Soe San; Htet Myet Naing Zin
- Story by: Rajat Arora
- Starring: Lu Min; Pyay Ti Oo; Eaindra Kyaw Zin; Khine Thin Kyi; Htet Htet Htun
- Production company: Everest Film Production
- Release date: September 19, 2019
- Running time: 120 minutes
- Country: Myanmar
- Language: Burmese

Nyit Toon (Burmese: ညစ်တွန်း) is a 2019 Burmese thriller drama film directed by Lu Min starring Lu Min, Pyay Ti Oo, Eaindra Kyaw Zin, Khine Thin Kyi and Htet Htet Htun. It is an official remake of the 2006 Indian Hindi Language film Taxi No. 9211 which was inspired by the 2002 American film Changing Lanes. The film, produced by Everest Film Production premiered in Myanmar on September 19, 2019.

== Cast ==
- Lu Min as Zaw Htet
- Pyay Ti Oo as Soe Ya Ko Ko
- Eaindra Kyaw Zin as Khin Thet Thet Wai
- Khine Thin Kyi as Nandar
- Htet Htet Htun as Sandi
