= Sa Yite =

2019 Burmese film

- film poster
- Burmese: စရိုက်
- Directed by: Aww Yatha
- Screenplay by: Moe Ni Lwin
- Based on: Sa Yite by Mite Mite (Pyay)
- Produced by: Aung Khit Min
- Starring: Lu Min; Kyaw Htet Aung; Htun Eaindra Bo; Khine Thin Kyi
- Production company: Aung Khit Min Film Production
- Release date: May 30, 2019
- Running time: 120 minutes
- Country: Myanmar
- Language: Burmese

Sa Yite (Burmese: စရိုက်) is a 2019 Burmese drama film, directed by Aww Yatha starring Lu Min, Kyaw Htet Aung, Htun Eaindra Bo and Khine Thin Kyi. The film, produced by Aung Khit Min Film Production premiered Myanmar on May 30, 2019.

== Cast ==
- Kyaw Htet Aung as Tin Maung Win
- Lu Min as Nyo Htun Lu
- Khine Thin Kyi as Bae Eu Ma
- Htun Eaindra Bo as Ma Yin Hla
