= Baw Baw Ka Htaw =

- ဘော်ဘော်ကထှော်
- Directed by: Ko Pauk
- Written by: Nyi Nyi Ba Maung
- Produced by: Lavender Production
- Starring: Myint Myat; Hsu Eaint San; Shwe Thamee; Mone; Khin Hlaing; Joker; Yaza Ne Win
- Edited by: Ko Pauk
- Release date: 13 July 2018
- Country: Myanmar
- Language: Burmese

Baw Baw Ka Htaw (Burmese: ဘော်ဘော်ကထှော်) is a 2018 Burmese comedy film directed by Ko Pauk and starring Myint Myat, Hsu Eaint San, Shwe Thamee, Mone, Joker, Khin Hlaing and Yaza Ne Win performed in this film. The film was produced by Lavender Production and which premiered in Myanmar cinemas on 13 July 2018.

== Cast ==
- Myint Myat as Baw Baw Pi
- Joker as Baw Baw Kaw
- Khin Hlaing as Baw Baw Ku
- Hsu Eaint San as Moe Swe
- Shwe Thamee as Saung Wai
- Mone as Nway War
- Yaza Ne Win
