= A Flower Above the Clouds =

2019 Burmese film

- Official Film Poster
- Burmese: တိမ်တွေပေါ်ကပန်း
- Directed by: Sin Yaw Mg Mg
- Screenplay by: Moe Ni Lwin
- Story by: Moe Ni Lwin
- Starring: Ryu Sang Wook; Kyaw Htet Aung; Wutt Hmone Shwe Yi
- Cinematography: Three Pound
- Music by: Diramore
- Production companies: JBJ Entertainment; Big 5 Film Production
- Release date: December 19, 2019
- Running time: 120 minutes
- Country: Myanmar
- Language: Burmese

A Flower Above the Clouds (Burmese: တိမ်တွေပေါ်ကပန်း) is a 2019 Burmese romantic drama film, directed by Sin Yaw Mg Mg starring Ryu Sang Wook, Kyaw Htet Aung and Wutt Hmone Shwe Yi. The film was shot a joint venture between Myanmar and South Korea; produced by JBJ Entertainment and Big 5 Film Production premiered Myanmar on December 19, 2019.

== Synopsis ==
Jae Won, who lives in Korea, came to Thantlang on the Chin Hills to do charity work. At that time, it was a big movie to see what would happen between Jae Won and Hnin Sat in Thantlang.

== Cast ==
- Ryu Sang Wook as Jae Won
- Kyaw Htet Aung as Htan
- Wutt Hmone Shwe Yi as Snow, Hnin Sat
- May Than Nu
