= Thu Ngal =

2017 Burmese film

- film poster
- Burmese: သူငယ်
- Directed by: Pwint Theingi Zaw
- Screenplay by: Moe Ni Lwin
- Story by: Moe Ni Lwin
- Produced by: Aung Khit Min
- Starring: Yan Aung; Ye Aung; Min Oo; Kyaw Htet Aung; Soe Myat Thuzar; Htun Eaindra Bo; Khine Thin Kyi
- Production company: Aung Khit Min Film Production
- Release date: June 23, 2017
- Running time: 120 minutes
- Country: Myanmar
- Language: Burmese

Thu Ngal (Burmese: သူငယ်) is a 2017 Burmese drama film, directed by Pwint Theingi Zaw starring Yan Aung, Ye Aung, Min Oo, Kyaw Htet Aung, Soe Myat Thuzar, Htun Eaindra Bo and Khine Thin Kyi. The film, produced by Aung Khit Min Film Production premiered Myanmar on June 23, 2017.

== Cast ==
- Kyaw Htet Aung as Nyi Thuta / Yu Ya Maung / Sue Sha Ko Ko
- Yan Aung as Shwe Thein Maung
- Ye Aung as Htoo Sein
- Min Oo as Dr. Ngwe La Yaung
- Soe Myat Thuzar as Moe Khin Khin
- Htun Eaindra Bo as Nway Oo May
- Khine Thin Kyi as Saung Hay Man
- Mari Cole as Police Woman
