= Kyat Gu =

2018 Burmese Film

- Film Poster
- Burmese: ကြတ်ဂူ
- Directed by: Lu Min
- Screenplay by: Myint Oo Oo Myint
- Story by: Min Min Hlaing
- Starring: Lu Min; Myint Myat; Kyaw Htet Aung; Htun Eaindra Bo; Eaindra Kyaw Zin
- Cinematography: Win Lwin Htet
- Production company: Aung Tine Kyaw Film Production
- Release date: November 16, 2018
- Running time: 114 minutes
- Country: Myanmar
- Language: Burmese

Kyat Gu (Burmese: ကြတ်ဂူ) is a 2018 Burmese drama film, directed by Lu Min starring Lu Min, Myint Myat, Kyaw Htet Aung, Htun Eaindra Bo and Eaindra Kyaw Zin. The film was produced by Aung Tine Kyaw Film Production and premiered in Myanmar on November 16, 2018.

== Cast ==
- Lu Min as Shwe Daung
- Myint Myat as Htaw Gyi
- Kyaw Htet Aung as Kyaung Saya
- Htun Eaindra Bo as Mya Sein
- Eaindra Kyaw Zin as Shwe Hmyin
