= Yu Thandar Tin =

Burmese actress

- ယုသန္တာတင်
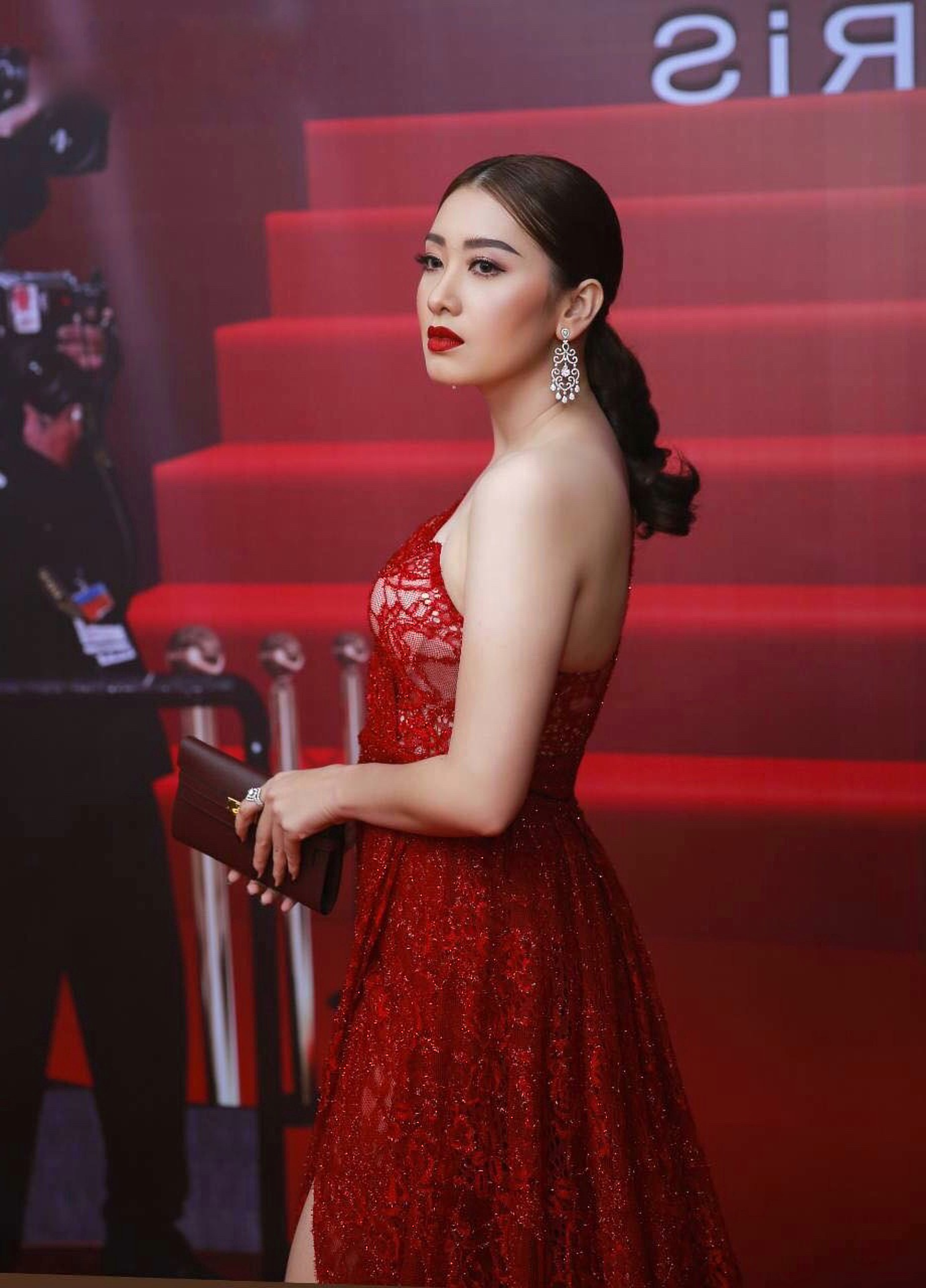
- Yu Thandar Tin at an event
- Born: 6 March 1991 (age 35); Labutta, Ayeyarwady Region, Myanmar
- Education: Dagon University
- Occupations: Actress, Model
- Years active: 2009–present

Yu Thandar Tin (Burmese: ယုသန္တာတင်; born 6 March 1991) is a Burmese actress, model and former beauty queen. She has acted in over 150 films.

== Early life and education ==
Yu Thandar Tin was born on 6 March 1991 in Labutta, Ayeyarwady Region, Myanmar, to Aung Naing, a trader, and his wife Khin Nwe Yee. She has two younger siblings. She moved to Yangon with her family in 2006. She attended high school at Basic Education High School No. 3 Dagon. She studied Civil engineering at West Yangon Technological University for two years and then switched to distance education at the Dagon University, graduating with a BA in English in 2015.

== Career ==
Yu began her modeling career in 2009 with John Lwin's John International Modeling Agency. Since then, she has participated in numerous modeling competitions and runway shows. She has also appeared on magazine covers and worked as a commercial model for various advertisements.

In 2009, Yu competed in the Miss Lorkrathong pageant and achieved first runner-up. Later that year, she participated in the Miss Now How pageant, where she won the Miss Now How Popular award and was again the first runner-up. She also won the Miss Ngwe Saung 2010 title and was appointed as the ambassador for Ngwesaung Beach. Her success in modeling resulted in several movie casting opportunities.

She made her film debut in Nhait War Ta Ni (Two Yellow, One Red) alongside Lu Min in 2011. In 2013, she starred in Yet Lal with Lu Min and Ei Chaw Po, which led to increased recognition for her.

Her first big-screen role was in 2015 with the film Aung Myin Kyaw Kyar Suesha Htet Myat.

In 2019, she starred in the comedy-horror film Thaye Thinbaw (Ghost Ship). That same year, she starred in the comedy-horror film Double Wedding and then Aung Twal Taw Sein Arr Thit.
