= M Zaw Rain =

M Zaw Rain အမ်ဇော်ရိန်
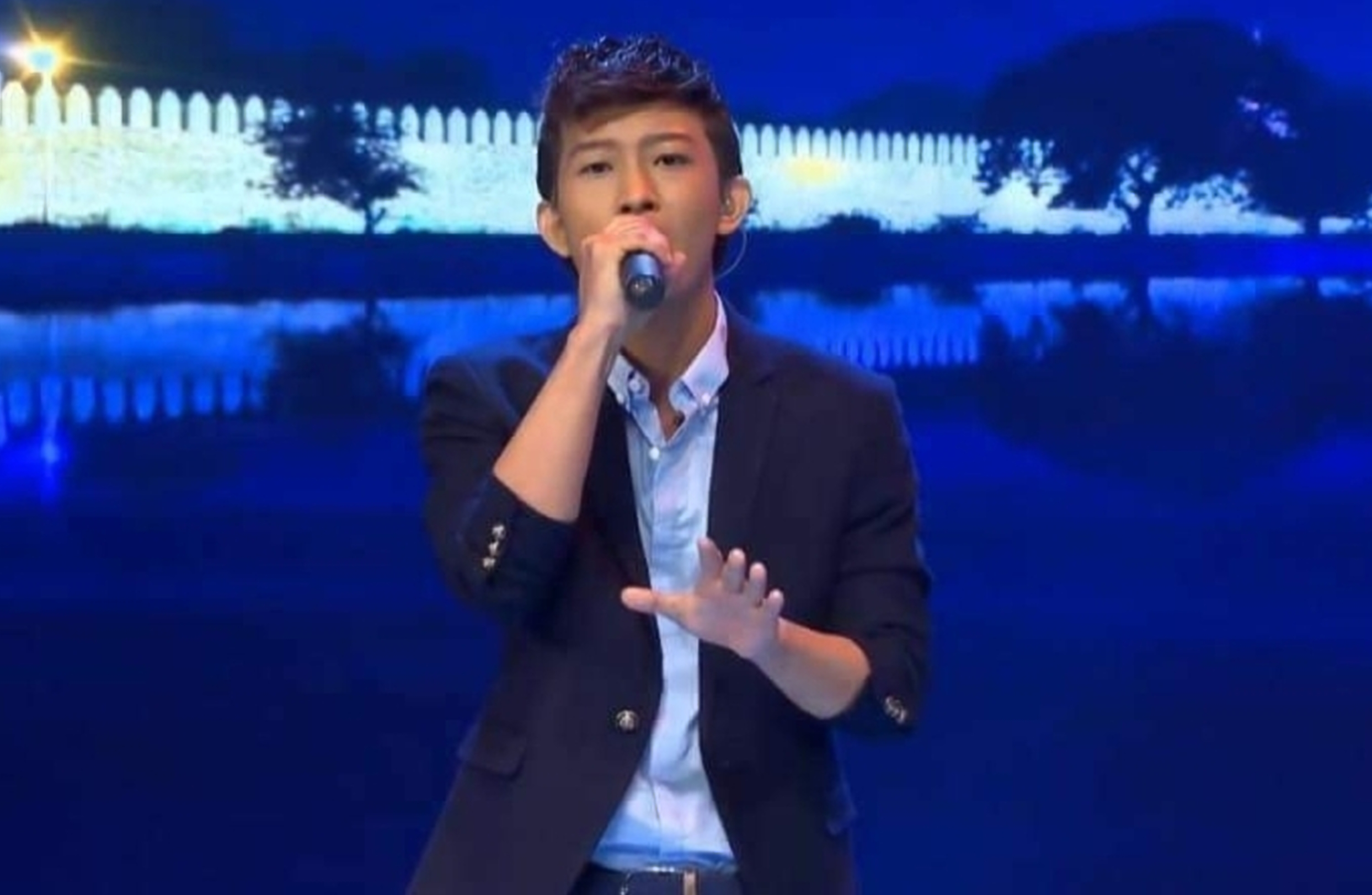
- M Zaw Rain in 2017

Background information
- Born: 20 January 1993 (age 32); Pyinmana, Myanmar
- Genres: Pop
- Occupation: Singer-songwriter
- Instruments: Vocals; piano; guitar
- Years active: 2015–present
- Website: M Zaw Rain on Facebook

M Zaw Rain (Burmese: အမ်ဇော်ရိန်; born 20 January 1993) is a Burmese singer-songwriter of ethnic Kachin descent. He rose to prominence following his finish as the runner-up on the first season of Myanmar Idol. M Zaw Rain released his debut album Sate (Mind) on 15 December 2016.

== Early life and education ==
M Zaw Rain was born on 20 January 1993 in Pyinmana, Myanmar to parents M Zaw Kun and Naw Christabal of an ethnic family. His father is Kachin and mother is Karen. He is the youngest son of four siblings. He graduated in Civil engineering from Technological University, Yamethin.

== Career ==
M Zaw Rain started out on his music career as a contestant in Myanmar Idol, a televised singing competition. In Myanmar Idol grand final, he competed with Saw Lah Htaw Wah and Ninzi May. With the voting results of the whole country, Saw Lah Htaw Wah became the winner, and he finished as 1st runner-up. After he has competed in Myanmar Idol, performed in many concerts and he started endeavoring to be able to produce and distribute a solo album. He launched his debut solo album "Sate" on 15 December 2016.

In June 2017, Miss Myanmar USA Pageant Event, Tour USA 2017 concert invited M Zaw Rain and other ethnic artists, Sai Sai Kham Leng, Sone Thin Par, Mi Mon Mon Thike, Billy Lamin Aye and Saw Lah Htaw Wah. They performed at the Las Vegas, Los Angeles and San Francisco.

M Zaw Rain gained "Award of the 2016 demanding most song from the released album of Myanmar Idol Season 1" at the Shwe FM 7th Anniversary Ceremony.

== Discography ==
=== Solo albums ===
- Sate (စိတ်) (2016)
