= Double U (DJ) =

Double U ဒီဂျေဝိုင်း

Background information
- Born: Yan Naung Soe; 15 April 1987 (age 39); Yangon, Myanmar
- Genres: Uplifting Trance, Progressive Trance, Melodic House, Electro House
- Occupations: DJ, music producer, composer
- Years active: 2000—present

Double U, also known as DJ Wine (Burmese: ဒီဂျေဝိုင်း; born Yan Naung Soe on 15 April 1987), is a Burmese DJ, music producer and composer. He started his music career with underground dance music production in the early 2000s. He produced tracks for the opening and closing ceremonies of the 2013 Southeast Asian Games in Myanmar and he made the background music for the popular film Angel of Eden. He was also part of the lineup for the Together Festival.

During the 2021 Myanmar coup d'état, he became a political critic of Myanmar's ruling military junta. Because of his involvement in anti-coup protests, an arrest warrant was issued for him, and he fled to United States.

== Career ==
In 2000, he started his music career with underground music production in his studio. He began as a disc jockey in 2001, and playing in the Thingyan Festival aka Water Festival in Yangon. In 2003, he met with DJ Jam, DJ Jay, and DJ Rahul and with their support, released local albums, remixes and singles. Those four founded the Myanmar DJ Association.

In 2005, Double U opened a DJ school with DJ Jay, and also produced more than 20 tracks and remixes for Myanmar night life and produced several tracks for the album Yaw Thamha Mhway. In 2006, he started the joint project with Dj Jay and released the album ABCD. He released the album New Top Melodies, a collaboration with DJ Thaw Thaw, in 2008. In 2010, he released the album The Best of Myanmar DJs 2010, along with DJ Rahul, DJ Thar Nge, DJ K.E, Bryant and Myo Myo. He performed at Soe Thu's one-man show with a track named "Black Coffee" in 2012.

In 2013, his tracks has been selected for the opening and closing ceremonies of the 2013 Southeast Asian Games in Myanmar. The same year, he released the album EDM 2013 with Myo Myo, DJ K.E, Okkar Oo Thar, DJ Rush, Anegga, Thar Nge and ICEZ. He also performed at the biggest festival of the year. the New Year Eve Myanmar Countdown Festival. In 2014, he performed in the first EDM festival in Myanmar named Shut Up & Dance Music Festival and G-square EDM Music Festiva.

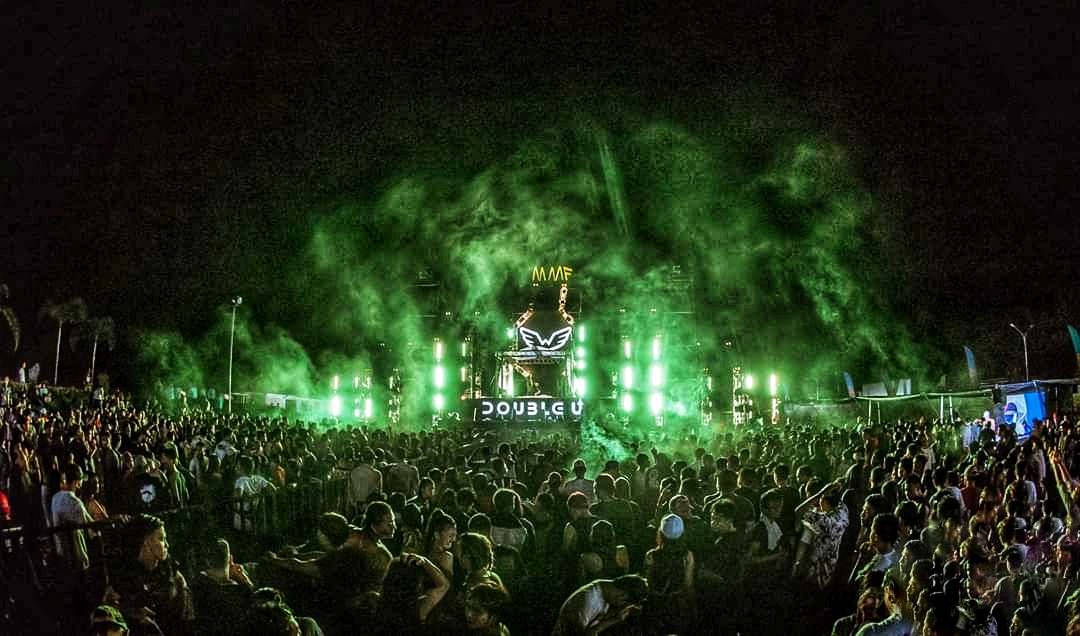
Music concert of Double U

In 2016, he started working with NUAC Orchestra Event and performed a live act of Martin Garrix's "Animal". The same year, he performed at the Together Festival Yangon, 808 Festival Yangon, Myanmar Evolution : Time Machine (both Yangon and Mandalay), Barrack Water Festival, Da Saung Dine Music Festival and in Myanmar Countdown 2017 too.

In 2018, Double U was a judge for Myanmar DJ Contest. The same year, he played at Infinity Music Festival, Together Festival 2018 and Transcend. On 13 July 2018, he performed in the major music concert NUAC Orchestra Music Showcase, together with R Zarni, Aung Htet, Wyne Su Khaing Thein, Eaint Chit and Ni Ni Khin Zaw in the National Theatre of Yangon.

== Political activities ==
He created music to promote campaigns for Aung San Suu Kyi's NLD during the 2020 Myanmar general election.

Following the 2021 Myanmar coup d'état, Double was active in the anti-coup movement both in person at rallies and through social media. On 8 April 2021, warrants for his arrest were issued under section 505 (a) of the penal code by the State Administration Council for speaking out against the military coup. Along with several other celebrities, he was charged with calling for participation in the Civil Disobedience Movement (CDM) and damaging the state's ability to govern, with supporting the Committee Representing Pyidaungsu Hluttaw, and with generally inciting the people to disturb the peace and stability of the nation.

He escaped Yangon to Thailand afterwards, and eventually fled to the United States as a political refugee.
