= Saung Oo Hlaing =

Burmese singer-songwriter (born 1970)

Saung Oo Hlaing ဆောင်းဦးလှိုင်
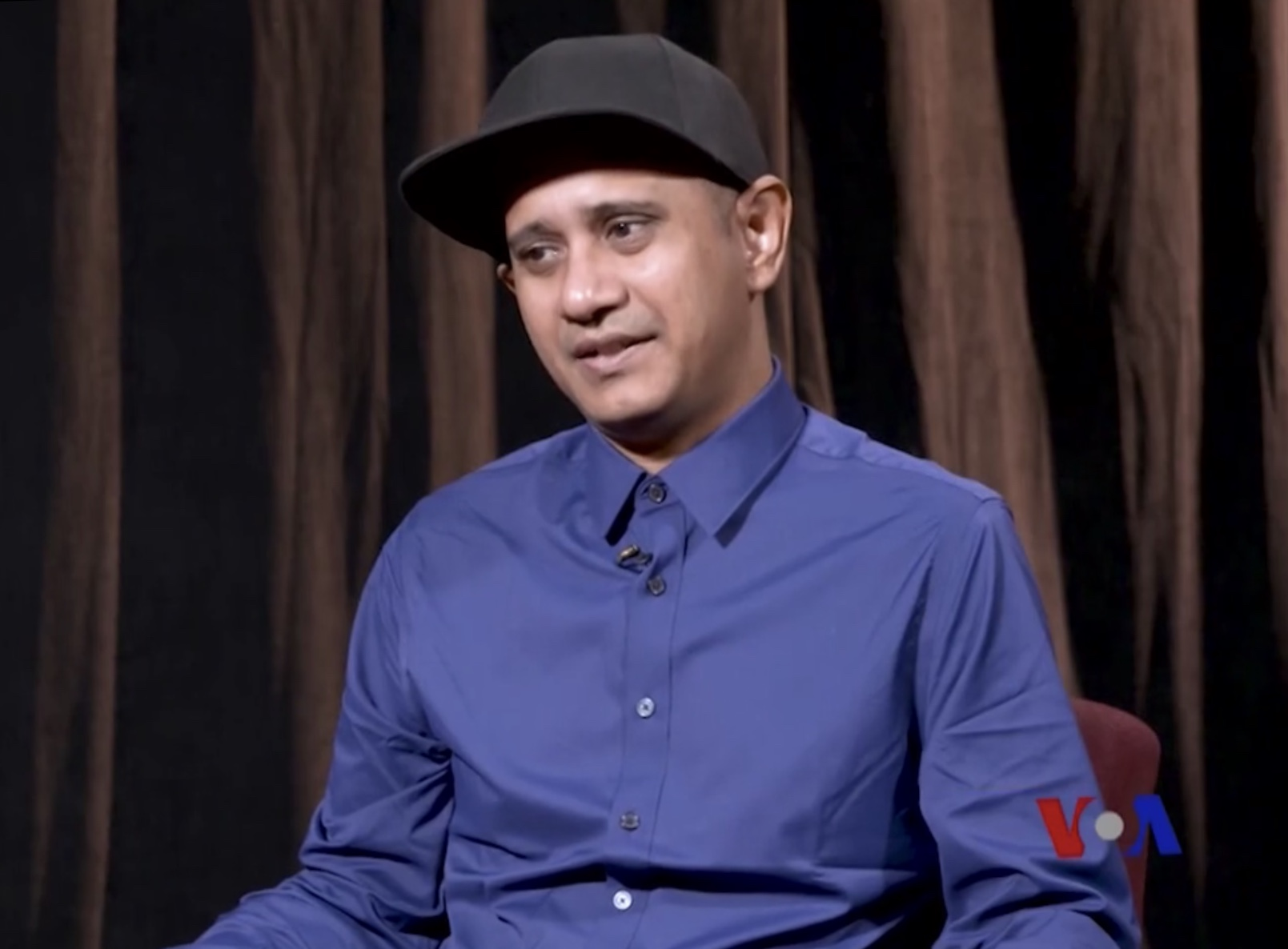
- Saung Oo Hlaing is in VOA Burmese interview

Background information
- Born: 8 December 1971 (age 54); Yangon, Myanmar
- Genres: Burmese pop
- Occupations: singer, composer
- Years active: 1994 – present

Saung Oo Hlaing (Burmese: ဆောင်းဦးလှိုင် [sʰáʊɰ̃ ʔú l̥àɪɰ̃]; born 8 December 1971) is a Burmese singer-songwriter. He is one of the few Burmese successful songwriters that do not rely on writing cover songs. In a 2008 interview, he claimed that he had not written a cover song. In 2019, he admitted that most of 1000 plus songs he had written were of his own creation.

Saung Oo Hlaing is a medical doctor by profession; he has a MBBS degree from the University of Medicine 1, Yangon.

In the aftermath of the 2021 Myanmar coup d'état, Saung Oo Hlaing is giving humanitarian assistance to the poor people of Myanmar and living in the United States of America.

== Discography ==
=== Solo Albums ===
- Min Yae Thu Ye Kaung (မင်းရဲ့သူရဲကောင်း) (1994)
- Tay So Nget Yae Ar Yone Oo (တေးဆိုငှက်ရဲ့အရုဏ်ဦး) (1995)
- Kaung Kin Yae Arr (ကောင်းကင်ရဲ့အား) (1996)
- Romantic Rock (ရိုမန်တစ်ရော့ခ်) (1996)
- Ko Paing Thin Kay Ta (ကိုယ်ပိုင်သင်္ကေတ) (1997)
- A Phyu Yaung Tha Chin (အဖြူရောင်သီချင်း) (2000)
- Kyun Taw Tha Chin (ကျွန်တော့်သီချင်း) (2002)
- Saung Oo Mhat Tann (ဆောင်းဦးမှတ်တမ်း) (2003)
- A Hlu Taw Mingalar (အလှူတော်မင်္ဂလာ) (2007)
- Hna Lone Thar Tway Hlu Mae Nya (One Man Show) (နှလုံးသားတွေလှူမယ့်ည) (2012)
- A Nya Ta Ya Thu Ye Kaung (အညတရသူရဲကောင်း) (2012)
- Kabar San Chain (ကမ္ဘာ့စံချိန်) (2017)
