= Khine Thin Kyi =

Burmese actress

- ခိုင်သင်းကြည်
- Born: 27 September 1971 (age 54); Rangoon, Union of Burma (now Yangon, Yangon Region, Myanmar)
- Other names: Ma Put Kyut (မပွတ်ကျွတ်)
- Education: B.Sc (Chemistry)
- Alma mater: Yangon University
- Notable work: Actress
- Spouse: Khant Naing
- Parents: Mg Mg (father); Wah Wah Soe (mother)
- Family: San Htate Htar Oo (daughter)

Khine Thin Kyi (Burmese: ခိုင်သင်းကြည်; born 27 September 1971) is a two-time Myanmar Academy Award winning Burmese film actress. She is considered one of the most commercially successful actresses in Burmese cinema.

== Early life and education ==
Khine Thin Kyi was born on 27 September 1971 in Yangon, Myanmar to parents Mg Mg and his wife Wah Wah Soe. She graduated with B.Sc (Chemistry) from Yangon University.

== Career ==
She made her acting debut with the film Moeyan Tho Pyant Lwant Say Mei Kaythayarzar Toh Ei Arr Mann (မိုးယံသို့ လွင့်ပျံစေမယ့် ကေသရာဇာတို့၏ အားမာန်), directed by Sin Yaw Mg Mg.

== Filmography ==
=== Film (Cinema) ===
- Beyond the Horizon (2005)
- Lae Sar (လှည့်စား) (2006)
- Sone Pyu (စုန်းပြူး) (2013)
- Goodmanner exist in mind (2014)
- Thu Ngal (သူငယ်) (2017)
- Pyan Pay (ပြန်ပေး) (2018)
- Sa Yite (စရိုက်) (2019)
- Sein Gorli Ma Yoke Kyar (စိန်ဂေါ်လီမယောက်ျား) (2019)
- Yoma Paw Kya Tae Myet Yay (ရိုးမပေါ်ကျတဲ့မျက်ရည်) (2019)

=== TV series ===
- Ma Ma Htake and Heritage House (2016)
- Sue Pann Khwai Thwe Bayet Hnint Pay Ywat Leik Nahtaung Sin (2020)

== TV show ==
- Myanmar's Got Talent
- The Mask Singer Myanmar

== Awards and nominations ==
Year	Award	Category	Nominated work	Result
2001	Myanmar Motion Picture Academy Awards	Best Supporting Actress	Another Side Of Love	Nominated
2005	Myanmar Motion Picture Academy Awards	Best Supporting Actress	Beyond The Horizon	Nominated
2007	Myanmar Motion Picture Academy Awards	Best Supporting Actress	Mother and Daughters	Nominated
2013	Myanmar Motion Picture Academy Awards	Best Supporting Actress	Sone Pyu	Won
2014	Myanmar Motion Picture Academy Awards	Best Actress	Goodmanner exist in mind	Won

== Personal life ==
Khaing Thin Kyi married Khant Naing in 2002. They have one daughter, San Htate Htar Oo, is also a model.
