= Lu Min (actor) =

- လူမင်း
- Born: Aungpan, Shan State, Myanmar
- Occupations: Actor, director
- Spouse: Khin Sabe Oo
- Children: Ayarwady Lu Min; Awaratt Lu Min
- Awards: Myanmar Academy Award
- Website: http://www.luminn.com/

Lu Min (Burmese: လူမင်း, pronounced [lù mɪ́ɰ̃]; also spelt Lu Minn) is a five-time Myanmar Academy Award-winning Burmese film actor and director. He has served as the Chairman of the Myanmar Motion Picture Organisation from 2014 to 2017. Throughout his successful career, he acted in over 1000 films.

== Life ==
He was born and raised in Aungpan in Shan State. In 2008, he and his wife, Khin Sabe Oo became one of the first couples in Myanmar to receive fertility treatment via intracytoplasmic sperm injection. Their daughter Ayarwady Lu Min was born later that year.

In 2005, he produced and starred in the film Kyan Sit Min, base on the life story of the Pagan era's King Kyansittha, was the first in Burma to be shot on digital video format before being transferred to film, and perhaps the first Burmese movie in recent decades to score commercial success abroad.

On 17 February 2021, in the aftermath of the 2021 Myanmar coup d'état, authorities issued an arrest warrant for Lu Min for encouraging civil servants to join ongoing civil disobedience movement, along with several other celebrities.

On 20 February 2021, Lu Min was arrested by the military while in hiding.

== Filmography ==
=== As actor ===
- Shwe Mhone Kyel Dae Kaung-Kin (2002)
- Kyan Sit Min (ကျန်စစ်မင်း; 2005)
- Mystery of Snow (လျှို့ဝှက်သောနှင်း; 2005) – The guide's son
- Pin Lal Htet Ka Nay Won Ni (2010)
- Ko Tint Toh Super Yat Kwat (ကိုတင့်တို့စူပါရပ်ကွက်; 2014) – Baydin Sayar
- Chit San Eain 2028 (ချစ်စံအိမ်၂၀၂၈; 2015) – Ko Oo
- Zero (ဇီးရိုး; 2015)
- Anubis (အနူးဘစ်; 2016)
- Professor Dr. Sate Phwar II (ပရော်ဖက်ဆာဒေါက်တာဆိတ်ဖွား နှင့် မြိုင်ရာဇာတာတေ; 2016)
- Kyat Gu (ကြတ်ဂူ; 2018) – Shwe Daung
- The Milk Ogre (နို့ဘီလူး; 2019) – The Milk Ogre
- Sa Yite (စရိုက်; 2019) – Nyo Htun Lu
- Jin Party (ဂျင်ပါတီ; 2019) – Let Yone
- Nyit Toon (ညစ်တွန်း; 2019) – Zaw Htet
- Way Ma Nay Chin Bu (ဝေးမနေချင်ဘူး; 2022)

=== As director ===
- Kyan Sit Min (2005)
- Reflection (2018)
- Kyat Gu (2018)
- The Milk Ogre (2019)
- Nyit Toon (2019)

== Awards and nominations ==
Year	Award	Category	Nominated work	Result
2002	Myanmar Academy Award	Best Actor	Shwe Mhone Kyel Dae Kaung-Kin	Won
2005	Myanmar Academy Award	Best Actor	Kyan Sit Min	Won
2005	Myanmar Academy Award	Best Picture	Kyan Sit Min	Won
2016	Myanmar Academy Award	Best Supporting Actor	Professor Doctor Sate Phwar II	Won
2019	Star Award	Best Actor in a Supporting Role	Nge-Kyun	Won
