= Saya Saung =

Burmese painter (1898–1952)

- Born: 1898
- Died: 1952 (aged 53–54)
- Known for: Painting
- Movement: Mandalay School; Transparent Western-style Watercolor Painting

Saya Saung (1898–1952) was an early Burmese watercolorist who adopted the Western style of painting and became famous in Burma for his landscape works. He is less known for his portraits, about seven of which have surfaced in recent years.

== His title: Saya ==
Saya Saung is the only early Western-style painter who has the honorific “Saya” (meaning master) automatically attached to his name, a title generally reserved for the painters of the Traditional School in Burma. In Saya Saung's case, the honorific may have attached to him because he was from Mandalay, the capital of the fallen Konbaung dynasty (1752–1885) and the heart of the Traditional arts, where artisans trained rigorously in apprenticeship systems working themselves up gradually to the status of master, or Saya. Saya Saung did not pass through such demanding and subservient rites of passage in his acquisition of talents in Western painting, but once he was recognized as possessing master-level skills, it would have been natural in the cloistered world of Mandalay for the title “Saya” to be applied to his name.

== His Burmese teachers ==
The painter who is invariably mentioned as Saya Saung's teacher is Ba Zaw (1891–1942). However, Ludu Daw Amar in her book Modern Burmese Painting also mentions the painter Maung Maung Gyi (1890–1942) as an early instructor of Saung. As Amar was a writer, publisher, and member of an intimate Mandalay intelligentsia which included painters, she is probably right on this point.

Maung Maung Gyi ran away from home in 1906 at the age of 16, traveling as a sailor to England with the aim of studying painting there. He received painting instruction of some kind in England but from which academy or teachers is not known. When Maung Maung Gyi returned to Burma a year or two later, his adventures abroad earned him celebrity status and he began to pass on his skills as a plein air watercolorist in the Western style to other artists in Burma. Thus, it is possible, but not certain, that somewhere between 1909 and 1916 that Maung Maung Gyi served as Saya Saung's first teacher. The art historian Nyan Shein (who studied painting under Saya Saung) says that Saya Saung became a professional painter by the age of 18, or by about 1916.

The art scholar and painter Min Naing, biographer of Ba Nyan, documents that after Ba Zaw returned to Burma in 1930 from three years of studies at the Royal College of Art in London that he began to teach watercolor “wash” painting to Saya Saung. However, since Ba Zaw and Saya Saung were both from Mandalay and painters in Mandalay shared a sense of regional kinship, it is almost certain that Saya Saung forged a relationship with Ba Zaw before he left for London in 1927 and that Ba Zaw's influence on Saya Saung began earlier, but not, perhaps, as early as 1916.

== The J.J. Hilder factor ==
A well-known painter in Australia, Jesse Jewhurst Hilder (1881–1916), who never traveled to Burma or met its artists, had a large influence on the painting of both Ba Zaw and Saya Saung, and through them, many other Burmese painters. Hilder was a classic painter of the British Watercolor School Style in which the color white was not mixed with watercolor and thus the medium remained watery (“pure”) and difficult to handle. In addition, Hilder borrowed other aspects of traditional British watercolor, especially in his use of subdued colors. J.J. Hilder was a virtuoso watercolorist (deserving more credit than he has yet received) applying the British style to capture the sandy-brown landscapes of Australia. Shortly after he died in 1916, two books of his works were published: J.J. Hilder, Watercolorist, a catalog in 1916, and The Art of J.J. Hilder in 1918. One of these books, probably the latter, was on sale in Burma and fell into the hands of Ba Zaw and Saya Saung.

The Hilder influence on the works of both Ba Zaw and Saya Saung is legendary in Burma, although it is not absolutely certain whether Ba Zaw introduced Saya Saung to the works of Hilder or if Saya Saung encountered them on his own. Ba Zaw may well have been the initiator as the early art historian G. Hla Maung, in his sketches on Burmese painters, quotes Ba Zaw as telling Saya Saung that the best method for Saung to develop as a painter was to copy each of Hilder's paintings at least “hundred times”. Amar quotes Saya Saung as telling her that Ba Zaw learned painting by copying each of Hilder's paintings in the Hilder book he possessed “twenty times”, which suggests that Ba Zaw was the discoverer of Hilder's work. Ko Ko Naing, however, states that Saya Saung's encounters with Hilder's work occurred before he trained with Ba Zaw.

== Diversity of style and quality ==
A limited number of Saya Saung's landscape works emerged on the art market in Burma in the 1990s and sold off quickly to collectors. During this same period and into the years after 2000, many other paintings surfaced in the UK, corroborating claims that Saya Saung's work sold well to British colonials. The majority of the works which surfaced in Burma and the UK were of Upper Burma scenes—often of the old Mandalay Palace and moat, Mandalay Hill, boats on the Irrawaddy River, or village scenes. The paintings discovered in Burma were generally characterized by a heavy brownish and yellowish coloring with pinches of red in figures wearing longyi, not unlike the narrow use of color in J. J. Hilder's works. One painting, Water Lilies, of the Mandalay Palace moat, which was done at least three times, may be regarded as one of Saung's outstanding pieces and hints that he may also have known the works of Monet.

Not all the works found in the UK conform to the expectations of a painter influenced by J.J. Hilder nor are all of them of a consistent style or of an exceptional quality. Some of the works found in the UK possess wan coloring and indistinct mastery of composition and subject matter. Other works from the UK, however, possess masterful command of watercolor wash technique. Surprisingly, in a handful of compelling moonlit scenes of the Mandalay Palace and moat, Saung's work possesses bright contrasts in coloring, very much unlike Hilder's work. Among the latter paintings, two works, in a vivid wash of yellow, blue and touches of purple, were signed collaboratively by Saung and U Thant. Thant (1896–1982) was one of Saya Saung's prominent students in Mandalay.

It is tempting to conclude the following: one, that Saung's less cohesive works were done in the early part of his career, perhaps all the way up to 1930; two, that his more powerful paintings date from the post-1930 period when he began to avail himself of the training which Ba Zaw had acquired in London at the Royal College of Art; and three, that in late works, he began to collaborate on occasion with Thant (or did works on his own) in a vibrant, colorful style which broke from the influence of Ba Zaw and Hilder. But as Saung never signed his paintings with dates, one can only speculate on his periods. The above would not account for when Saung encountered Hilder's work and began to use it as a training tool. It seems likely that some of his strong works pre-date 1930.

== Saya Saung’s portraits ==
One fascinating portion of Saung's oeuvre are his little-known portraits. Approximately seven have appeared thus far, but there may be a dozen or two more. One of these works has appeared in two publications: Amar's Modern Burmese Painting and Ranard's Burmese Painting: A Linear and Lateral History. These portraits, like those of M.T. Hla (U Tun Hla) (1874–1946) and Yatanabon Maung Su (1903–65), are of ethnic minorities, in Saung's case often of the Shan.

== Comparison with M.T. Hla and Yatanabon Maung Su ==
It is interesting to compare Saya Saung's portraits with those of M.T. Hla, the early Burmese pioneer in Western-style painting, or of Yatanabon Maung Su. Much of M.T. Hla's work bears the stamp of his early training as a Traditional painter, with the subjects in somewhat stiff, mock postures of realism. In contrast to Hla, Yatanabon Maung Su's many ethnic portraits are polished, detailed works of formal realism, though it must be added that Maung Su often repeated his subjects. Four of the seven Saya Saung's portraits which have emerged recently differ considerably from the work of both these artists. While there is clear anthropological intent and curiosity in the work of M.T. Hla and Yatanabon Maung Su, some of Saung's portraits were executed with a freer, less restrained line, suggesting a painter whose taste, in at least some works, leaned in the direction of “art for art’s sake”.

Because Saya Saung could rapidly execute watercolor works, he earned the nickname in Burma as “Seven-Minute Saya Saung”, the time that it took for him to smoke a cigarette. But his watercolors were probably executed in the span of about 30 minutes.

== Personal life and career ==
Saya Saung was of royal blood, perhaps partly accounting for another nickname in Burma “The Prince of Watercolor”, a possible double-entendre which reflected both his family background and his skills as a watercolorist. As an adolescent he attended St. Peter's School in Mandalay and in adulthood served as a clerk in the Forestry Department and later taught as an art teacher at St. Paul's High School. He lived in Rangoon but also spent much of the year in Mandalay, his home. Because he lived in both Mandalay and Rangoon, he passed on his skills as a transparent watercolorist to painters in both communities. He sold as many as 100 of his watercolor paintings to foreign collectors and was fairly well-off. His outdoor painting companions were Ngwe Gaing, San Win, Ohn Lwin and Bo Let Ya (an amateur painter who was a member of the Thirty Comrades).

Saung was a notoriously heavy drinker who loved a party, described as “prodigal” by G. Hla Maung, who also mentions that he was able to paint when inebriated. His drinking habits apparently caused his death at the early age of 52 or 53, when he collapsed during a night of alcoholic revelry, dancing with fellow painters. He was married three times and apparently was not a devoted husband.

== Saung’s death ==
A legend has attached to his death. In 1951 or 1952, he applied for the position of principal of the State School of Fine Arts in Rangoon when it was being founded. During his interview for the position, he confessed that he appreciated oil painting but was inept at it. Nonetheless, he won the position of principal, but the news of his successful application arrived the day or just days before his death. In Burmese Painting: A Linear and Lateral History, Ranard quotes a conversation with Nyan Shein, the art historian and painting student of Saya Saung, who said that Saya Saung was actually celebrating the news of his appointment as principal the very night he died. Nyan Shein said he had heard this story from the painter Ohn Lwin (1907–88), who was at the party along with other artists.

== His legacy ==
Saya Saung's legacy, in conjunction with Ba Zaw's, was very large. The two painters together established the foundations of the Mandalay School, meaning, generally, modern Western-style painting in Mandalay. In the pre-World War II years, this school of painting focused on transparent watercolor painting, often plein air and often of the iconic sites of Mandalay and Upper Burma, while in Rangoon the skills of oil painting and gouache began to develop under the tutelage and legacy of Ba Nyan, who like Ba Zaw had studied in London in the 1920s at the Royal College of Art (Ba Nyan spent eight years studying in England, however, and also studied at Frank Spenlove-Spenlove's Yellow Door School). While Ba Zaw was elder to Saya Saung and his teacher, Saya Saung's legacy was deeper than Ba Zaw's because a large number of Saya Saung's watercolor paintings survived to be seen and studied, while few of Ba Zaw's have.

Countless painters in Burma studied under Saya Saung and were influenced directly by him or attempted to mimic his style from a distance. In this sense, he had pivotal influence in Burma. Some of the more well-known artists whom he influenced were Ba Thet, U Kyi, Thant, Ba Aye, Aye Maung, and M. Tin Aye, as well as Nyan Shein and G. Hla Maung who were not only documenters of Burmese painting history but avid artists themselves.

== Reaction against the Ba Zaw-Saya Saung style ==
Ultimately, there was a reaction in Mandalay against this “Royal Academy” style, as it is sometimes called in Burma (i.e., British Watercolor School Painting). The rebellion was initiated by Ba Thet (1903–72) who began to flout British and European conventions which Burmese painters had borrowed. Through Ba Thet and much more deeply through his close friend Kin Maung (Bank) (c. 1908–83), a modernist movement came to Mandalay in the 1960s which eschewed the old British tendency to depict heavily representational, iconic countryside scenes in transparent watercolor. This Mandalay movement began to challenge the Rangoon School, founded by Ba Nyan, and became a forefront in progressive, expressionistic painting. But the old Saya Saung style did not disappear. Even today, transparent watercolor painting, often wash style—both landscape and portrait—are still being painted in Burma by very good artists.

== Museum and Library Collections ==
- National Museum of Myanmar
- Universities Central Library, Yangon

== See also ==
- Ba Zaw
- M.T. Hla (U Tun Hla)
- Maung Maung Gyi
- Ba Thet
- Ba Nyan
- Kin Maung (Bank)
- Jesse Jewhurst Hilder
- Thirty Comrades
- Bo Let Ya
- Ngwe Gaing
- San Win

== Bibliography ==
- Andrew Ranard (2009). Burmese Painting: A Linear and Lateral History. Silkworm Books. ISBN 9789749511763.
- G. Hla Maung (1968). On International and Burmese Painting (in Burmese). Sit Thi Daw Sarpay.
- Nyan Shein (1998). On Burmese Painters, Sculptors, and Architects, Vol. 1 (in Burmese). Sarpay Beikman.
- Min Naing (1974). U Ba Nyan: His Life and His Paintings (in Burmese). Sarpay Beikman.
- Amar, (Ludu Daw) (1997). Modern Burmese Painting (in Burmese). Yarbye Press and Kyibwa Press.
- Ko Ko Naing, (Yamanya) (1997). The History of Burmese Painting (in Burmese). Sarpay Beikman.
