= Ba Zaw =

Painter

- Born: 1891; Thayet, British Burma
- Died: 1942 (aged 50–51)
- Education: Royal College of Art
- Known for: Painting
- Movement: Mandalay School
- Patrons: Martin Jones

Ba Zaw (Burmese: ဘဇော်; 1891–1942) was an early Burmese artist born in Thayet and raised in Mandalay who mastered western painting. He and his student, Saya Saung, are largely responsible for creating the foundations and identity of a Western-style painting circle within the Mandalay School. The Mandalay School, when examined as a whole, included diverse artists—painters who devoted themselves to Western-style painting as well as professional Traditional Burmese painters whose specialty and livelihood came from painting Buddhist works for temples and other religious buildings. Almost all the Traditional painters dabbled in or heavily experimented in Western-style painting from time to time.

== Early life and education ==
Ba Zaw was born to a well-known silversmith by the name of U Kyin who was awarded a gold medal by a British viceroy of Burma. He attended St. Peter's High School in Mandalay and then entered Judson College in Rangoon in about 1911 or 1912. Judson College later merged with University College to become Rangoon University in 1920; thus, Burmese sources often mistakenly or casually claim that Ba Zaw attended Rangoon University although the university had not yet been established when Ba Zaw was a college student.

Ba Zaw's skills as an artist were noticed by influential persons by the time he attended Judson College or during that time. Around the year 1912, while working on his B.A. at Judson, two British academics in Rangoon took interest in Ba Zaw's artistic career—a Mr. A.R. Morris, headmaster of Insein Engineering School (also referred to as the Institute of Technology at Insein), and Martin Ward, a university physics professor who later became the first chairman of the Burma Art Club (BAC). The two drafted a plan to send Ba Zaw to Bombay to study art, but Ba Zaw wanted to complete his B.A. first, and the project was postponed. The start of World War I scuttled these plans entirely. Ba Zaw's health was frail, and he subsequently fell ill, quit his university studies, and took a job as an art instructor at St. Paul's High School in Rangoon.

== Early painting influences ==
The history of Ba Zaw's early training as a painter is a patchwork of contradictory claims. For example, Ludu Daw Amar and Ko Ko Naing describe Ba Zaw as self-taught and maintain that he learned painting by studying from books. Min Naing, on the other hand, mentions that the doyen of Traditional painting in Burma at the turn of the century, Saya Chone (1866–1917), was an instructor of Ba Zaw while Ba Zaw taught at St. Paul's High School and offers convincing details about their interaction. Nyan Shein claims that Ba Ohn (c. 1877 – fl. 1924) was one of Ba Zaw's teachers, and Ko Ko Naing acknowledges the influence that the three early British chairmen and teachers of the Burma Art Club (BAC)—Martin Ward, Martin Jones, and E.G.N. Kinch—had on Ba Zaw, which is almost certainly true. The BAC was informally organized in 1913 as a venue where amateur British colonial painters in Burma might meet and exchange skills, and became more officially established in 1918. Toward the later date, the BAC began to train Burmese painters. Ba Zaw was one of the earliest Burmese members of the club, and he picked up much from its lectures. Ko Ko Naing and Amar's claim that Ba Zaw was self-taught is accurate in the sense that Ba Zaw was self-taught to a degree. He won scholarships or painting competitions when he was a youngster before he encountered Ba Ohn, Saya Chone or British painters.

Daw Amar nudges up to Ba Zaw's connection to both Saya Chone and Ba Ohn. She states that Ba Zaw was very good at painting Traditional Burmese arabesque, one of the skills which Min Naing claims he learned from Saya Chone. She also mentions that Ba Ohn was the first Burmese painter to illustrate school textbooks, and that when Ba Ohn's illustrations became outdated, Ba Zaw was hired by Macmillan to illustrate “Burmese Peacock” readers, but she stoutly emphasizes that Ba Zaw accomplished these illustrations on his own, without instruction. She goes on to say, however, that Ba Ohn learned painting techniques from B.H. Wiles (a European painter in Burma who also taught Maung Maung Gyi) and adds that Ba Zaw was also friendly with Wiles. One must wonder if these three painters sometimes kept company, and if Ba Zaw not only learned something from Ba Ohn but also Wiles.

Despite Ba Zaw's training with Saya Chone, as Min Naing contends, Ba Zaw did not take this training far. On the contrary, he became a somewhat obsessive and dogmatic follower of Western-style British painting, particularly transparent watercolor painting, his specialty. G. Hla Maung quotes Ba Zaw as telling Saya Saung, his student, that good painters “never use many colors” and other writers state, variously, that he was afraid of the colors green and violet, but passionate about orange and red. In Burmese Painting: A Linear and Lateral History, Ranard claims that Ba Zaw's "strict canon" regarding color likely derived from British sources, directly or obliquely, through exposure to the work of J. J. Hilder (see below), from his British teachers at the Burma Art Club, or in England where Ba Zaw studied at the Royal College of Art in the late 1920s. As Ranard puts it, "...his British patrons might well have said such things, the distaste for gaudy over-use of color being so common to the British."

== Influence of J J Hilder ==
Ba Zaw came in contact with the work of the Australian painter Jesee Jewhurst Hilder (1881–1916) some time after Hilder's death in 1916. After Hilder's death, two books containing images of his watercolor paintings appeared, J.J. Hilder, Watercolorist, a catalog in 1916, and The Art of J.J. Hilder in 1918. One of these books fell into Ba Zaw's hands, probably the latter, and left a deep impact on him. The book also came into the possession of Saya Saung (1898–1952), Ba Zaw's Mandalay student, and richly influenced Saya Saung as well. There is some uncertainty about which painter actually encountered Hilder's work first and the date at which the encounters occurred. G. Hla Maung, Nyan Shein, and Amar all state or suggest that Ba Zaw first discovered Hilder's work, while Ko Ko Naing is the single detractor, claiming that Saya Saung became a student of Ba Zaw after Saya Saung started using Hilder's paintings for learning exercises.

In Burmese Painting: A Linear and Lateral History, Ranard speculates that Hilder's landscapes of Australia, done in subdued color in the British style, may have appealed to Ba Zaw because these works resembled the brownish orange landscapes of Burma. He also draws parallels between the tragic history of both artists, their high-strung temperaments, their lives marked by “asthenia”, and their “aesthetic austerity” (which may have drawn them to the purity of watercolor transparency, unmixed with white). Hilder became tubercular at a young age, suffered greatly as a result, and died young. He was an artist of high standards who was often critical of his own work (destroying much of it) and touchy and short-tempered with friends. Ba Zaw's life was also troubled. His right hand was emaciated from birth and he was forced to paint with his left hand, and was so sensitive about his physical deformity that he often hid his left hand in his longyi. He loved romantically only once, but on the eve of his marriage to the woman, the lady died. The event (circa 1922) severely scarred him and he remained a bachelor the rest of his life. Amar remarked of Ba Zaw that he was “taciturn” and had little sense of humor. G. Hla Maung quotes Ba Zaw as likening the agony of the artist to the experience of man who “sees a heavy saw falling upon his feet ... [who] feels pain even before he is actually hurt.”

== Trip to London ==
Ba Zaw is often quoted hand-in-hand in Burma with Ba Nyan (1897–1945) because the two painters were the earliest Burmese artists to receive formal, academic education in Western-painting. In the 1920s, both studied at the Royal College of Art in London. However, Ba Nyan's experience preceded Ba Zaw's. Ba Nyan left for London in 1921, but only spent a year or so at the Royal College of Art, partly because he could not follow the lectures in English and partly because the training at the college was tedious and slow. Ba Nyan wanted to graduate to oil painting quickly, but realized it would take years for this to occur at the college. Martin Ward, one of Ba Nyan's sponsors in Burma, came to his rescue. While on a trip to England, Ward managed to have Ba Nyan transferred to the Yellow Door School, the private academy of London artist Frank Spenlove-Spenlove (1867–1933).

Ba Zaw's sojourn to England began later, in 1927, while Ba Nyan was on his second trip for studies in London. Ba Zaw, whose English was good, did not have the difficulties that Ba Nyan had had at the Royal College of Art, and, in addition, Ba Zaw's instruction there in watercolor painting and etching apparently suited him. Ba Nyan was a student with more practical aims, whereas Ba Zaw was adept at art history and theory. Ba Zaw graduated easily from the school in three years with an ARCA (Associate of the Royal College of Art), apparently not studying oil painting there.

In addition to Hilder, Ba Zaw was also attracted to the watercolor works of Sir William Russell Flint (1880–1969) and owned one of Flint's books. Ba Zaw's discovery of Flint's works may have occurred while he was in London, where Flint was a painter of repute, later becoming president of the Royal Society of Painters in Water Colours from 1936 to 1956.

== Ba Nyan – Ba Zaw rift in Burma ==
Both Ba Nyan and Ba Zaw returned to Burma in 1930 (Ba Nyan from approximately eight years of study in London and Ba Zaw from three). It was Ba Nyan, not Ba Zaw, however, who received triumphant accolades in Burma, holding a famous exhibition at the Governor's House only months after his return. In London Ba Nyan had mastered the arts of oil painting and gouache, while Ba Zaw, who had remained at the Royal College of Art, refined his techniques in watercolor. Ba Nyan began to surprise Burmese painters with his techniques in thick, impasto oil and in gouache; Ba Zaw, on the other hand, left as a watercolorist and returned as one. Thus, the two painters began to divide the Burmese art community into camps, one following the new styles that Ba Nyan was introducing and the other stubbornly sticking to the transparent watercolor techniques that had been introduced at the Burma Art Club at least a decade earlier and remained the domain of Ba Zaw.

== Appearance of Rangoon School and Mandalay School ==
Ba Nyan, from southern Burma, became a Rangoon painter and his new techniques took root there. Ba Zaw was a Mandalay painter (though he lived in Rangoon) and his major protégé was Saya Saung (1898–1952), who lived part of the year in Rangoon and part of the year in Mandalay. As was common among Mandalay artists, both Ba Zaw and Saya Saung maintained allegiances to Mandalay, and through Saya Saung, transparent watercolor painting—often “wash” style—became the de rigueur expertise of Mandalay painters. Mandalay painters were very proud of these skills to the extent that Amar, a Mandalay writer, claimed that Ba Nyan, who painted watercolor in gouache, was not recognized as a true watercolor painter. Out of the rift between Ba Zaw and Ba Nyan, a Rangoon School and a Mandalay School of painting emerged, the former tied to the instruction of Ba Nyan, which focused on oil painting and occasionally gouache, and the latter, derived from Ba Zaw who passed on his skills to Saya Saung, which painted in the English watercolor style. However, in the 1950s and 60s, the Mandalay painters rebelled against their Ba Zaw – Saya Saung legacy, and began a movement in expressionist and abstract painting in both watercolor and oil, spurred on by the Mandalay painters Ba Thet (1903–72) and, particularly, Kin Maung (Bank) (c. 1908 – 83).

== Ba Zaw's oeuvre ==
=== Watercolors and surviving pencil sketch ===
Very little can be said about Ba Zaw's works in spite of his great influence on Burmese painting because, to date, only about five of his works have surfaced. Three of the works are watercolors on permanent display in the collection of the National Museum of Myanmar, one of which appears in Ranard's Burmese Painting: A Linear and Lateral History. It is a watercolor landscape bearing the orange, brown and yellowish tones that one might expect of a painter influenced by J. J. Hilder. The works in the National Museum have historical importance, but they cannot be called remarkable.

Two additional Ba Zaw pieces emerged in Burma in the years after 2000. One is a pencil sketch on paper that appeared in Myanmar Painting: From Worship to Self-Imaging by Ma Thanegi et al., and the other is a monochrome watercolor from a private collection that appears in Ranard's Burmese Painting. The pencil sketch is a dark work of dense mass—a landscape with a single isolated figure—that is apparently a funeral scene and clearly shows emotive skills. The monochrome watercolor is a portrait of the famous Burmese general Maha Bandula, who died in the First Anglo-Burmese War of 1824–1826, sitting proudly astride a horse.

=== Etchings ===
As a result of his training at the Royal College of Art, Ba Zaw also became an enthusiastic etcher. According to G. Hla Maung, Ko Ko Naing, and Amar, he worked on copper plates but Nyan Shein claims he used a sharp stylus on bronze plates. The location of Ba Zaw's etching works, inside or outside of Burma, is not known.

=== Cartoons ===
Ba Zaw also made a large impact in Burma in the art of cartoon, his works appearing in Thuriya magazine. He began drawing such art in the 1920s, and became a teacher to the Burmese cartoonist of note, Hein Soon (1902–1989). As cartoon art and caricature were popular among the British amateur painters at the Burma Art Club, it was at the BAC that Ba Zaw most likely honed such skills. Martin Jones, who was one of the early British members of the BAC, is said to have been the first painter in Burma to draw and publish cartoons in Burmese publications. Such works can be found in Ballads of Burma, reprinted in recent years. Martin Jones was a close friend and patron of Ba Zaw.

=== Reference to oil paintings ===
Nyan Shein, the art writer and student of Ba Zaw, claims that Ba Zaw also painted in oil, but this is not a widely documented point.

=== Popularity of works ===
Amar claims that Ba Zaw's work sold in large numbers to colonials in Burma, but oddly none of these paintings (unlike those of Saya Saung) have appeared in the hands of UK auctioneers or dealers in recent years. Amar also alleges that Ba Zaw was so successful that he was the only artist of his era in Burma to own an automobile.

== End of life ==
In 1930 or 1931, the Teachers Training College opened in Rangoon and Ba Zaw was chosen as the art lecturer there. Ba Zaw accepted the position but had to give it up when he had a stroke while painting at the Shwedagon Pagoda in the year given as 1932. He was unable to handle his duties at the Teachers Training College, and his position there was taken over by San Win. Min Naing also mentions that Ba Zaw became chairman of the Burma Art Club in 1933, adding that Ba Zaw was also forced to give up this position due to his stroke. Min Naing's 1933 date for Ba Zaw's selection as chairman of the BAC is at odds with the 1932 date (given by others) of the stroke which severely debilitated him.

Ba Zaw lived on for almost ten more years, struggling to paint but mentally impaired. Nyan Shein offers a sad picture of him in his last years, visiting artists, clutching a book by J. J. Hilder in his hands. It is said that during these last years, he lived with Saya Saung and that two of his other students, Saya Mya and Hein Soon, also helped to take care of him. Nyan Shein gives Ba Zaw's date of death as 1943, but Amar claims that her husband found Ba Zaw's obituary in the newspaper and that he died on 11 December 1942.

== Museum collections ==
- National Museum of Myanmar

== See also ==
- Ba Nyan
- Saya Saung
- Jesse Jewhurst Hilder
- Burma Art Club
- Ba Thet
- Kin Maung (Bank)
- Sir William Russell Flint
- Frank Spenlove-Spenlove
