= Early Burmese comic art =

Despite being an imported tradition, comic art had a significant impact on Burmese visual culture. Comic art is a form of visual expression defined by sequences of juxtaposed panels containing stylised images with bold outlines which incorporate text or symbols as an integral part of the narrative. Introduced by members of the British colonial elite, who were also amateur artists, cartooning and comic art was embraced by Burmese artists as a new mode of visual and critical expression. First appearing in the early 1910s, within two decades comics and cartoons emerged as a significant vehicle by which political and social criticism could be made within Burma's restricted public arena. As the number of print publications in Burma grew, from 22 in 1911 to 103 in 1921 and finally to over 200 by the close of the 1930s, comics became a substantial avenue for entertainment, art and discourse.

== Origins and influences ==
The first cartoon published in Burma appeared in the Rangoon Times in 1912. The cartoon was created by Martin Jones, the British commissioner of Burma's railways. It depicted a young Burmese woman who attended a Western party and was subsequently humiliated. Jones published the derogatory illustration under the pseudonym Myauk, the derivation of the Burmese term myauk phyu meaning ‘white monkey’. A term the Burmese used to refer to the British colonial forces who occupied Burma from 1824 to 1948.

Jones along with fellow amateur colonial painters physics professor Kenneth Ward and principal of St. Mathews High School in Moulmien E G N Kinch founded the Burma Art Club in 1913. Their efforts were assisted by Commissioner Hla Aung and his partner Mya May, along with several young Burmese artists including Ba Zaw, Ba Nyan, Tha Dun, Tun Hla, and Ba Kyi. Located on the grounds of the Rangoon Government High School, the Burma Art Club was a colonial art institution with the objective of promoting Western-style painting and drawing, including cartooning, to select Burmese students. It has been suggested by art historian Andrew Ranard that:

Burmese students who studied cartoon art at the Burma Art Club felt some affinity for this new genre because it possessed elements of exaggeration with which they were already familiar in Traditional painting… Pagan painting and the mural painting of Burma from the 17th to 19th centuries had a strong taste for caricature in its depictions of fairy-tale figures, demons, and beasts…

Among the first initiates to receive training from the establishment were the now notable Burmese cartoonists Ba Gale, also known as Shwe Talay or Shwe Yoe, and Ba Gyan. It is considered that the beginning of Burma's comic art movement was defined by these individuals.

== Ba Gale ==
Ba Gale (1893-1945) was a formative figure in Burma's burgeoning comic art scene. His career began in 1915, after publishing a cartoon in the Rangoon College Annual Magazine at the age of 22. Crucially, he was the first artist to draw and publish a cartoon in the Burmese language, which appeared in Thuriya, a publication run by young nationalists, in March 1917. Earning 10-15 kyat per cartoon (approximately AU $0.17) Ba Gale sought to make cartooning his career. His works subsequently appeared in the Rangoon Times and as part of the editorial pages in other smaller local newspapers.

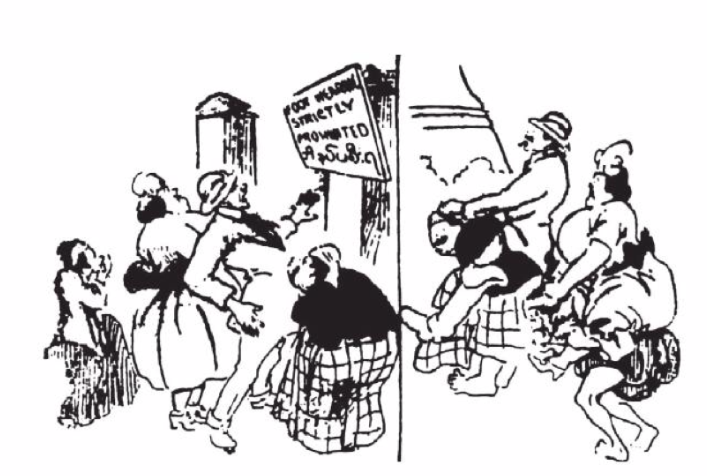
Ba Gale, Shwedagon shoe controversy comic, c. 1917

Ba Gale's style drew heavily from the European tradition of caricature. During his time at the Burma Art Club, he was introduced to and subscribed to the British comic publication Punch, known for its political and social satire. Despite being acknowledged as an adept artist and an astute pictorial commentator, the Burmese public initially found it difficult to understand and interpret Ba Gale's exaggerated and stylised drawing style. Writer and social historian Aung Zaw notes that:

To gain popular acceptance, Ba Gale’s cartoons were often accompanied by long captions or described poetically by editors. During British rule, captions often appeared in English. Respected Burmese literary figure Sayagyi Thakin Kodaw Hmaing edited The Sun and wrote many captions for Ba Gale, contributing to the public’s appreciation of the cartoonist…

Even in its earliest stages, Burmese comic art was political. Despite being a regular fixture within the English-language periodicals that circulated throughout Burma, Ba Gale's works often parodied the British administration. However, he did not limit his critique to the colonialists. He also used comic art to critic prominent social issues such as opportunistic politicians and what he perceived as sycophantic behaviour towards the British. Considered one of Ba Gale's most famous cartoons is his portrayal of the 1917 resolution to forbid colonial forces from wearing shoes within the Shwedagon Pagoda; an act which was forbidden by Burmese religious custom. Ba Gale illustrated the portly colonialists, identified by their opulent Western dress, riding on the back of Burmese people like horses so that they did not have to obey the custom of removing their shoes within the Shwedagon. Ba Gale does not just lampoon the British and their disrespectful behaviour he also questions the attitudes of those Burmese people who assist them. Ba Gale, however, did not escape criticism entirely. A cartoon which depicted the leader of a 1930 peasant uprising as a hero earned him substantial condemnation from British officials, though he was never jailed. Towards the mid-1920s Ba Gale transitioned into filmmaking and acting where he gained significant popularity.

== Ba Gyan ==
The political inclination first seen in Ba Gale's work was furthered by his contemporary Ba Gyan (1902-1953) who rose to prominence in the 1930s with his bold cartoons and nationalist agenda. Ba Gyan, like Ba Gale, also trained at the Burma Art Club where he was singled-out by founder Martin Jones for his ‘talent, humour and desire to entertain.’ Ba Gyan's practice traversed a number of fields. In addition to working as an editorial cartoonist, he also illustrated children's magazines, worked as a commercial photographer, novelist and animator. Ba Gyan was instrumental in establishing the Burmese animation industry. In 1934 and 1935 he produced Burma's first animated films, Kye Taungwa and Athuya respectively. Previously, Burmese comic art had been restricted to single cartons or limited panel short stories, however, in 1937 Ba Gyan created Burma's first comic book, Ko Pyoo and Ma Pyone. At this stage Ba Gyan also began to work with recurring characters whose antics would be developed and explored across the political and humour panels of several major publications.

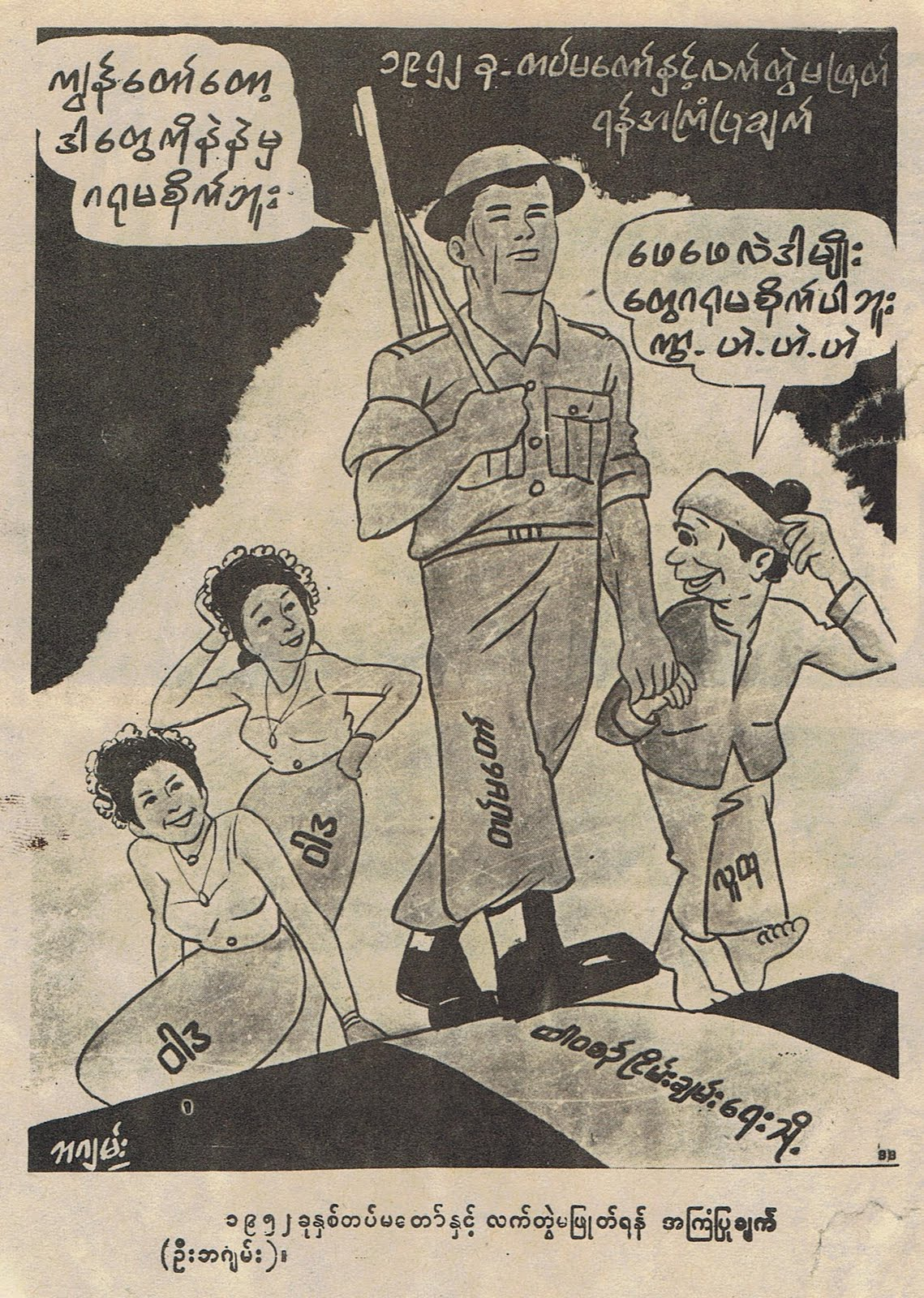
Ba Gyan, Tatmadaw (Armed Forces) political comic, first published 1952. Text running upper centre to centre right translates to, '1952 - The plan to not split the people and the Armed Forces'.

After Burma gained its independence in 1948, Ba Gyan's comic production became explicitly political and highly critical. Of particular significance was a cartoon which appeared in a local newspaper on January 4, 1948. The comic depicted British General Sir Hubert Rance departing Burma, waving goodbye to a local family as he tells them ‘Take care of your children.’ Behind the amicable scene are three children each symbolising a damage caused by the Second World War: debt, destruction and economic crisis. Ba Gyan's use of metaphor as a communicative device shows a growing sophistication and maturing in Burma's comic art movement. Gallerist and collector Aung Soe Min claims that the cartoon's popularity stemmed from its ability to concisely express Burma's situation at the time.

Post-independence Ba Gyan took a firmly partisan stance satirising both sides of Burma's new political regime; lampooning the Prime Minister U Nu and the opposing communist leader Thakin Than Tun. Aung Zaw notes that Ba Gyan's influence was respected and recognised by these figures. By the early 1950s Burma was embroiled in political turmoil and on the cusp of a civil war, in a bid to quell a social uprising Prime Minister U Nu sought a meeting with Ba Gyan asking him to only exhibit cartoons which exhibited peace and unity. Famously, he refused to compromise informing U Nu that he was too busy to attend the meeting. Ba Gyan, and other early cartoonists such as Hein Sung, viewed their role as ‘public watchdog’s’ who were responsible for keeping the Burma's independent power structures in check.

== Post-independence Onwards ==
The proceeding period of development in Burma's comic art which spanned from the early 1950s until the military takeover of 1962 was an era of growth and experimentation in which younger artists expanded on the visual tradition established by Ba Gale and Ba Gyan. Without the competition of television, periodicals inundated with comics became one of the major sources of entertainment particularly for the younger generation. However, following the 1962 coup by the socialist, military leader Ne Win, Burma's comic art with its fundamental political basis languished under the strictures of the junta. Comic art stagnated until the 1970s when developments in the book publishing industry helped to revive the practice.

== Bibliography ==
- Aung Soe Min. “Comic Culture in Myanmar: When Lines Shine a Light in the Darkness.” Goethe Institut. Accessed April 30, 2016. https://www.goethe.de/ins/mm/en/kul/mag/20697882.html.
- Aung Zaw. “Pioneers of Burmese Cartooning.” Irrawaddy 11, no. 7 (2003). Accessed April 30, 2016. Pioneers of Burmese Cartooning.
- Lent, John A. Asian Comics. Jackson: University Press of Mississippi, 2015.
- Lent, John A. “Cartooning in Southeast Asia.” In Encyclopedia of Humour Studies, edited by Salvatore Attardo, 724-5. Thousand Oaks: Sage Publications, 2014.
- Littner, Bertil. “Avoiding the Draft.” Far Eastern Economic Review 148, vol. 3 (1991): 31-2.
- Moilanen, Irene, and Sergeĭ Sergeevich Ozhegov. Mirrored in Wood: Burmese Art and Architecture. Bangkok: White Lotus Press, 1999.
- Moore, Elizabeth, Hansjörg Mayer and U Win Pe. Shwedagon: Golden Pagoda of Myanmar. Bangkok: River Books, 1999.
- Myo Thant. “Social Critics, Satirists and Humourists.” Paper presented at the National Workshop on Copyright: Myanmar's Gateway to IP, Yangon, September 7, 2005. Accessed April 30, 2016. http://www.accu.or.jp/appreb/02/02-02/02-02country/previous/prev_mm.html.
- Ranard, Andrew. Burmese Painting: A Linear and Lateral History. Chiang Mai: Silkworm Publications, 2009.
- Seekins, Donald. Historical Dictionary of Burma (Myanmar). Maryland: Scarecrow Press Inc, 2006.
- Tin Maung Muang Than. “The Media in Myanmar.” In Media Fortunes, Changing Times: ASEAN States in Transition, edited by Russell Hiang-Khng Heng, 139-72. Pasir Panjang: Institute of Southeast Asian Studies, 2002.
- Thompson, Virginia. “Burma.” In South East Asia: Colonial History - Vol IV, edited by Paul H Kratoska, 81-8 . London: Routledge, 2001.
