= San Win =

San Win is a Burmese name and may refer to:

- San Win (painter) (1905–1981)
- San Win (historian) (1947–2021), Burmese historian and archaeologist
- San Win (politician), Burmese Minister of Commerce 1974–1976
