= List of museums in Myanmar =

Myanmar Motion Picture Museum

This is a list of museums in Myanmar (also known as Burma).

For museums in Yangon, see List of museums in Yangon.

- Chin State Cultural Museum
- Kachin State Cultural Museum
- Kayah State Cultural Museum
- Kayin State Cultural Museum
- Mandalay Cultural Museum
- Mon State Cultural Museum
- Museum of Shan Sawbwa
- National Museum (Naypyidaw)
- Pathein Cultural Museum
- Rakhine State Cultural Museum
- Shan State Cultural Museum
- Taungdwingyi Cultural Museum
- UBS Mayu

== See also ==
- Tourism in Myanmar
- Culture of Myanmar
- List of museums
