= Myint Myint Tin =

Burmese contemporary artist

- မြင့်မြင့်တင်
- Born: Myint Myint Tin; 1944 (age 81–82); Yangon
- Education: Studied under master U Lun Gywe at the University Arts Club
- Known for: Painter

Myint Myint Tin (မြင့်မြင့်တင်; born 1944) is a postwar and contemporary artist from Myanmar who became famous for Golf Ball paintings series.

She is also one of the early modern painters of the modern era, created since the 1970s. In those days when art books were scarce, she participated in numerous group exhibitions with contemporary artists and modern artists.

== Early life and education ==
Myint Myint Tin was born on 1944. From 1964 to 1968, she graduated with physics major at Yangon University. At the same time, she studied art under master Lun Gywe at the University Arts Club. She also earned diploma from the Dental Technology School.

== Careers ==
Until 1978, she worked as teacher at the Dental Technology School for 13 years.

From 1991 to 2006, she was established the "77 Art Gallery". Her paintings were successful until the United States, Malaysia, India and French.

== Selected exhibitions ==
=== Group exhibition ===
- 2019 Trailblazing Women, Intersections Gallery, Singapore
- 2020 Myanmar – International Women's Exhibition, Yangon
