= Ba Kyi =

Burmese artist

- ဘကြည်
- Born: 17 July 1912; Kyaikto, British Burma
- Died: 15 April 2000 (aged 87); Yangon, Myanmar
- Education: Apprentice to Ba Nyan, École Nationale Supérieure des Beaux-Arts (Paris), Pennsylvania Academy of the Fine Arts, University of Pennsylvania School of Fine Arts
- Known for: Painting
- Movement: Neo-Traditional Burmese Painting

Ba Kyi, FRSA (Burmese: ဘကြည် [ba̰ tɕì]; 17 July 1912 – 15 April 2000) was a well-known and prolific Burmese artist. He was initially trained in western painting, but in the post-World War II independence period, he initiated a revival of Traditional painting, borrowing from the Western training he had received as well as his own cultural heritage of painting styles and techniques.

== Early life ==
Ba Kyi was born on 16 July 1912 in Kyaikhto, and took up painting at an early age. He attended Rangoon University where he gained an Intermediate of Science and a Teachers Certificate. Beginning in 1933, he apprenticed under the master Ba Nyan, who had studied western oil painting in London, England and who painted in a realist and naturalist style. His fellow students studying with Ba Nyan included Bogalay Kyaw Hlaing, Aye Maung and Thein Han (painter). In 1939, when the State School of Art and Music opened, Ba Kyi became an art instructor there. Under the Japanese occupation during World War II, he was an art lecturer at the Institute of Art, which was organized by the Japanese. He designed currency notes, stamps and propaganda posters. After Myanmar regained independence, he painted huge theatre backdrops and drew many magazine covers and illustrations.

== Studies overseas ==
In 1949, he won a French government scholarship to the École Nationale Supérieure des Beaux-Arts in Paris, where he studied for one year. He was able to exhibit two of his works in Paris at 162e Exposition, Societe des artists francais, Salon 1949, and also in art shows in London and Monte Carlo. On his return, he was commissioned to illustrate the History of the Buddha compiled by Agga Maha Pandita Ashin Zanakabhivamsa, which he executed in watercolor in the Traditional Burmese painting style while adding considerable innovation. In 1958, the United States government awarded him a scholarship to study for a year at the Pennsylvania Academy of the Fine Arts in Philadelphia. During this time, he also attended the University of Pennsylvania School of Fine Arts in a program aimed towards earning an M.A., but he returned to Burma early and did not earn his M.A. there. As he is quoted often in Burma as possessing an M.A., including on his own resume, it seems that the M.A. was awarded to him by the Burmese government or some educational institution in Burma upon his return to Burma.

== Break from Ba Nyan ==
Ba Kyi was an early follower of the modern school of painting in Myanmar first established by Ba Nyan, but he gradually broke from Ba Nyan and began exploring Burmese Traditional culture and painting techniques. One interesting aspect about Ba Kyi is that his transformation from a Western-style realist and naturalist to a Traditional revivalist did not follow an easily defined linear pattern. Ba Kyi jumped back and forth between Western-style work and his Traditional painting, while also mixing the two genres in unusual combinations throughout his life. For example, his watercolor paintings in the early 1950s on the History of the Buddha (above) are clearly some of the more Traditional paintings he ever executed. They are done in bold contrasts of color with the anatomy of figures outlined in thin black lines, with almost no sfumato, as was typical of Traditional painting, but he also introduced a greater sense of anatomical proportion, Western-style perspective, shading, and a sense of movement through fluidity of line which was not typical of figurative work in older Traditional painting. In the 1960s, more than a decade later, he did a number of Western-style works of a realist and impressionist character. His murals at Yangon Airport in 1956 are intensely Traditional in their content, but the techniques in the paintings are mostly Western. By the 1970s, however, it seems that most of his work was in the revived Traditional vein.

== Mural works ==
Ba Kyi is known for his murals, including works on the walls of the library of the Yangon Institute of Education and two murals in the departure hall of Yangon Airport, depicting scenes from Myanmar legends. The paintings at Yangon Airport are thoroughly Burmese in content and tone, but were apparently influenced by his training in mural painting under Ba Nyan, who had encountered and spent some time studying the work of Frank Brangwyn, the British muralist, in London. Ba Nyan's one large mural in Burma was destroyed during World War II and pictures of it do not survive, so it is impossible to use it as a source of comparison with Ba Kyi's work. However, there is considerable similarity between the style of Ba Kyi's mural painting and that of Brangwyn in the muscular depiction of figures.

Ba Kyi also created mural paintings depicting important events in the Buddha's life in the two-storied Ordination Hall at Myanmar Buddhist Vihara, Bodh Gaya, Bihar, India. The paintings he made for Yangon's Strand Hotel show a humorous eye for the lighter side of Burmese character. Outside Myanmar, his works are on display in the Tashkent Museum, the Beijing National Museum, the Tropical Museum Amsterdam, and the Bodhgaya Museum in India. According to his resume, his works are also in the Sukarno Collection in Indonesia and the Collection of the King of Thailand.

== Critical observation ==
Min Naing, the art historian and painter who was a student of Ba Kyi, said of his work: "Ba Kyi has masterly control of lines and colour and with a few strokes of pencil or brush he makes a picture come alive. His lines are bold and his colours are lively and he can with his art convey his theme with great clarity. But his technique is purely Myanmar, so the configuration of his pictures tends to be graceful and elegant. No other artist excels him in Composition and Rhythm".

== Synopsis of his popular appeal ==
Ba Kyi was a simple and unassuming man, who led a quiet life. He lived in a rather large house in a prominent warren of Yangon, and it may be said that he was financially solvent and successful as an artist. A number of his paintings were given to foreign dignitaries as gifts of state, and in this respect he served as a kind of "ambassador" of the arts for Burma, regardless of regime, democratic or military, for his Traditional-style works had broad appeal across the Burmese spectrum. Other of his paintings hung conspicuously in hotels or venues such as university or public libraries, where Burmese could easily see them. His Neo-Traditional revival of Burmese painting arrived at a time when the Burmese, free of colonialism, were in sore need of reaffirming their national pride and zeitgeist. His works often expressed a broad, and even bawdy, sense of humor, much appreciated by ordinary Burmese but sometimes criticized by intellectuals if the subject of his painting was considered too serious for humor. His cartoon drawings for children books and magazines were very famous in the 70s. He taught Burmese history and Buddha life through his drawings to young and old. Ba Kyi became a lecturer at the Yangon Institute of Education, teaching there until his retirement in 1974. It is said that he was well loved and respected by his students and was often sympathetic to their demands for change of government. He died on 15 April 2000 at the age of 88.

== Museum and library collections ==
- National Museum of Myanmar
- Singapore Art Museum
- Tropical Museum Amsterdam
- Tatmadaw [Defense Services] Museum, Yangon
- (Yangon) Universities Central Library

== See also ==
- Ba Nyan
- Frank Brangwyn
