= Lun Gywe =

Burmese painter (1930–2025)

- လွန်းကြွယ်
- Born: 24 September 1930; Rangoon, Burma Province, British India
- Died: 1 October 2025 (aged 95)
- Known for: Painting
- Movement: Impressionist

Lun Gywe (Burmese: လွန်းကြွယ်, pronounced [lʊ́ɰ̃ dʑwɛ̀]; 24 September 1930 – 1 October 2025) was a Burmese painter who worked in oil and watercolor. Outside of Myanmar his work had been exhibited, often in solo shows, in Japan, the Republic of Korea, the People's Republic of China, Australia, New York City, the Republic of Singapore.

== Early life ==
Lun Gywe was born in Yangon, Burma Province, British India, on 24 September 1930, and was raised by his mother after his father died when he was five months old. From an early age he spent much of his time drawing.

== Education and career ==
Lun studied under Thet Win, Chit Maung, San Win, Thein Han (painter) and Ngwe Gaing, and graduated from the Art Institute of Teacher's Training in 1954. He was an instructor at the State School of Fine Arts, Yangon (1958–1979) and principal of this school (1977–1979). He also taught at the Fine Art association the University of Rangoon (1960–1979).

He studied in China in 1964, and was awarded a fellowship in art restoration to East Germany in 1971. His year-long stay in China had a strong influence, and he incorporated the Chinese brush and ink techniques into his oils and watercolors. The course in East Germany let him study European masters in East Berlin, Dresden and Potsdam and confirmed his love of impressionism. However, his greatest influence has probably been Thein Han, under whom he studied and with whom he retained a close relationship in his later life.

Lun was described as the greatest living Burmese painter. He began painting in a realistic and naturalistic vein, influenced by the major painters of the Rangoon School, Ba Nyan, Ngwe Gaing, San Win, and Thein Han who was his painting master. Over time, his works became more impressionistic and some of the works today might be called expressionistic. His exposure to rapidly executed Chinese ink and watercolor painting during his trip to China seems to have influenced his impressionistic work as he painted quickly and he was extremely prolific. His impressionistic work had been called "the action of impressionism". Of his Impressionist style, he stated, "I paint according to my emotions, drawing inspiration from smell and textures, light and shadow". An important part of his work focuses on the female form, his favourite subject. A strong believer in Buddhism, his work was unified by his devotion to the principles embodied in that religion of order, harmony, stability and grace. He reflected," I find inspiration in calmness. I cannot create a good painting when in an unsettled frame of mind. I often meditate before I start a painting".

Lun died on 1 October 2025, at the age of 95.

== Museum collections ==
- National Museum of Myanmar
- Singapore Art Museum
- National Art Gallery (Malaysia)

== See also ==
- Ngwe Gaing
- San Win
- Thein Han (painter)
