= Kyaw Hlaing =

Burmese artist

- ကျော်လှိုင်
- Born: 28 September 1914; Bogalay, British Burma
- Died: 13 April 1996 (aged 81); Yangon, Myanmar
- Known for: Painting
- Movement: Rangoon School

Bogalay Kyaw Hlaing (Burmese: ဘိုကလေး ကျော်လှိုင်, pronounced [bòɡəlé tɕɔ̀ l̥àɪ]; 28 September 1914 – 13 April 1996) was a Burmese artist. Due to his mastery of painting clouds, he was sometimes called "Cloudy Kyaw Hlaing".

== Early life ==
Kyaw Hlaing was born on 28 September 1914 in Bogalay (in the present-day Ayeyarwady Region), the son of wealthy parents interested in art. He studied art at Aid National Middle School. At the age of 18, with Ba Kyi, Aye Maung and Thein Han, he became a student under the master Ba Nyan, who had learned European oil painting techniques in London. After the Second World War, he entered a national painting competition, winning prizes in the still life, figure and landscape categories, and the overall gold prize. He found work as an art instructor in Bogalay, later moving to Yangon, where he taught in high schools for many years.

== Work ==
Kyaw Hlaing belonged to the second generation of Burmese painters who studied under Ba Nyan in the 1930s. After Myanmar gained independence in 1948, he continued to practice the European painting techniques he had learned during the colonial period. Kyaw Hlaing exhibited at many art shows in the 1960s, and many art lovers collected his paintings. The majority of his work was in watercolor, this oeuvre of pieces counting in the many hundreds. His oil work was less prolific, and the number of paintings is not known precisely: nearly a score of these works have emerged in the hands of Yangon art dealers in recent years. Kyaw Hlaing quoted 80 oil paintings to estimate the number of oil works he had done in his lifetime.

Kyaw Hlaing's watercolor works, which earned him the nickname "Cloudy", were rendered with skies full of clouds executed in many tones of white, often with portions of the clouds left unpainted to create a searing white given by the background watercolor paper. Many of his paintings are exhibited today in the New Treasure Art Gallery.

== Later years ==
After retiring, he was appointed an instructor at the Yangon Fine Arts school, teaching third-year students. His pupils included Min Wae Aung, Zaw Zaw Aung, Hla Tun, Zaw Win Pe and Kyaw Shein. Kyaw Hlaing was a handsome man with a wiry, towering frame. Two of his students, Min Wae Aung and Zaw Zaw Aung, painted portraits of him. One of these works by Zaw Zaw Aung, an ironic oil painting titled Portrait of U Kyaw Hlaing: Visit Myanmar Year 1996 (1995), was done when Kyaw Hlaing had passed the age of 80. It captured only the lower part of his body in a longyi with his withered legs crossed and his upper body hidden by a newspaper he was reading. It is in the Singapore Art Museum's collection.

He was a calm and taciturn person with a taste for tea and cigars, always helpful to his fellow artists. He lived with his wife in a poor quarter of Yangon. He painted until his last days. He died at the age of 82 on 13 April 1996.

== Museum collections ==
- National Museum of Myanmar

== See also ==
- Ba Nyan
