= Thein Han (painter) =

Burmese painter (1910–1986)

- သိန်းဟန်
- Born: Maung Sit; 1910
- Died: 1986 (aged 75–76)
- Known for: Painting
- Movement: Rangoon School
- Awards: Various Gold Medals and Silver Medals

Thein Han (Burmese: သိန်းဟန်, pronounced [θéɪɰ̃hàɰ̃]; 1910–1986) was a major Yangon painter of the post-World War II era who produced a number of memorable works and who had an abiding influence on the evolution of the more conservative painting styles in Burma in the decades that followed. He should not be confused with Thein Han the writer and art critic, who is often quoted for his article written on Burmese painting published in the Atlantic Monthly in 1958.

== Overview ==
Thein Han was one of the six original apprentices who lived with and studied under Ba Nyan after Ba Nyan returned from his art studies in London in 1930. Three of these apprentices became major painters in Burma and Thein Han was one of them. Other painters such as Ngwe Gaing and Kyaw Hlaing had spent long periods studying with Ba Nyan but not as a live-in apprentices at his home. In Burma, there is a certain sentimental attachment to those painters who studied under Ba Nyan as full-fledged apprentices, perhaps because this training was reminiscent of the training painters of the Traditional School had received as far as memory could recall.

Ba Nyan's two other apprentices who studied under him formally at his home — Ba Kyi and Aung Khin — broke away from Ba Nyan's realist and naturalist style of painting. Ba Kyi initiated a Neo-Traditional revival in the post-World War II period and Aung Khin became an impressionist, abstract expressionist, and finally a non-figurative abstract painter.

Thein Han, however, spent an unusual nine years studying with Ba Nyan and never rebelled against his style and thus remained a realist and naturalist throughout his painting career. For this reason, he was sometimes referred to as the "second U Ba Nyan" in Burma, a sobriquet that was not necessarily flattering.

== His early encounters with Ba Nyan ==
When Thein Han was in the tenth grade of secondary school, he encountered the work of Ba Nyan through an elder brother who knew Ba Nyan. From that point forward, he became obsessed with the art of painting and asked his parents to send him to art school but was turned down. Thus, he ran away from home to Yangon, where he stayed at U Ahdissawunssa's monastery, where a cousin was studying Buddhistic studies. This cousin, U Pandisa, introduced him to Ba Nyan and Ba Nyan accepted him as an apprentice. His birth name had been Maung Sit and Ba Nyan gave him the new name of Thein Han.

== Career ==
During Thein Han's painting career, he won six gold metals for oil painting, six gold medals for watercolor painting, and six silver medals awarded by the Burma Artists’ Association.

Before World War II, Thein Han took a position as a drawing teacher as Myin Chan High School in Central Burma. After the war, when the government opened up the Rangoon State School of Fine Arts in 1952, he joined the staff as an instructor of oil and watercolor painting, with an emphasis on color composition. He taught at the State School of Fine Arts until the age of 67. It was here at the State School of Fine Arts, that he left a large impact on the subsequent development of Burmese painting, passing down the techniques of realist and naturalist painting which he had learned from Ba Nyan. It must be said that his taste in painting was conservative, yet he also steeped Burmese painters in a solid, formal foundation of techniques.

Thein Han was not a zealously prolific painter, yet a number of his works are famous in Burma, particularly three oil paintings: She of his wife, Artist U Ba Nyan (1950), and a well-known self-portrait entitled Artist U Thein Han (1972). All three works appear in a softback publication entitled The Great Master Myanmar Artist U Thein Han’s Descendant U Lun Gywe. The book includes 30 of Thein Han's works and 30 by the contemporary painter Lun Gywe, one of his students.

Like Ba Nyan, some of Thein Han's best works are portraits, but he also did landscapes and still life. His son, Han Htut, has written an unpublished article on his father's history, entitled “Artist U Thein Han (1910-1986)” which lists 16 of his most important oil works. But perhaps three score or more works are undocumented.

While a teacher at the Rangoon School of Fine Arts and after his retirement, Thein Han often invited students to his home for lessons. After retirement he volunteered to teach for the Yangon University Art Club, and had classes at his home twice a week. In the history of Burmese painting pedagogy, Thein Han is a transitional figure in many ways. His own instruction came entirely through his apprenticeship with Ba Nyan, but he later became an instructor in a government school where his exposure to students was wide and not always intimate. Yet he tried to retain the intimacy of the old apprenticeship system by inviting students to his home to learn.

Through his roles as an instructor at the Rangoon State School of Fine Arts and as a master-in-residence at his private home, he influenced a generation of Burmese painters born in the 1940s. This cohort often reflects a stylistic lineage tracing back to the work of Ba Nyan. Several of his former students have since achieved prominence within the contemporary Burmese art community.

Two of Thein Han's most notable students were the major painters Ba Yin Galay (1916–1988) and Lun Gywe (b. 1930).

Thein Han died at the age of 76 in 1986.

== See also ==
- Ba Kyi
- Aung Khin
