= National Museum of Myanmar (Naypyidaw) =

National Museum (Naypyidaw)
- အမျိုးသားပြတိုက် (နေပြည်တော်)
- Established: 15 July 2015; 11 years ago
- Location: Ottarathiri Township, Naypyidaw, Myanmar
- Coordinates: 19.777483974144484°N 96.14057438133348°E
- Type: National Museum
- Owner: Ministry of Religious Affairs and Culture (Myanmar)

The National Museum of Myanmar (Naypyidaw) (Burmese: အမျိုးသားပြတိုက် (နေပြည်တော်)) is a modern museum located near the Kumudra circle, in Ottarathiri Township, Naypyidaw, Myanmar (Burma). Besides the older National Museum of Myanmar in Yangon, it is the second of the two national museums for Burmese art, history and culture in Myanmar.

== History ==
The construction of the museum began on 3 June 2010, and the museum was opened on 15 July 2015. The museum is open from 9:30 am to 4:30 pm, except on Mondays and public holidays.

The museum sustained damage during the 2025 Myanmar earthquake, with chunks of the ceiling falling off and cracks appearing in the walls.

== Objectives and major tasks ==
The objectives of the National Museum (Naypyidaw) are:

1. To elucidate the country's rich and advanced cultural heritage;
2. To showcase a high standing of national honor;
3. To elaborate natural soft power achievement;
4. To show systematic and competent management with a spectacular modern touch, reflecting the national pride and prestige of the country

Moreover, the National Museum's major tasks are the following:

1. Collection of museum objects
2. Preservation and conservation of museum objects
3. Research and publications
4. Object displays and exhibitions (permanent and temporary)
5. Public education and public relations for the purpose of community engagement

== Galleries ==
The total plot area of the museum is 35.19 acres (14.24 ha), and the museum has five wings: A, B, C, D and E. The entrance hall A includes a small theatre, VIP reception rooms, a room displaying gifts to the president, historic cars, as well as public areas.

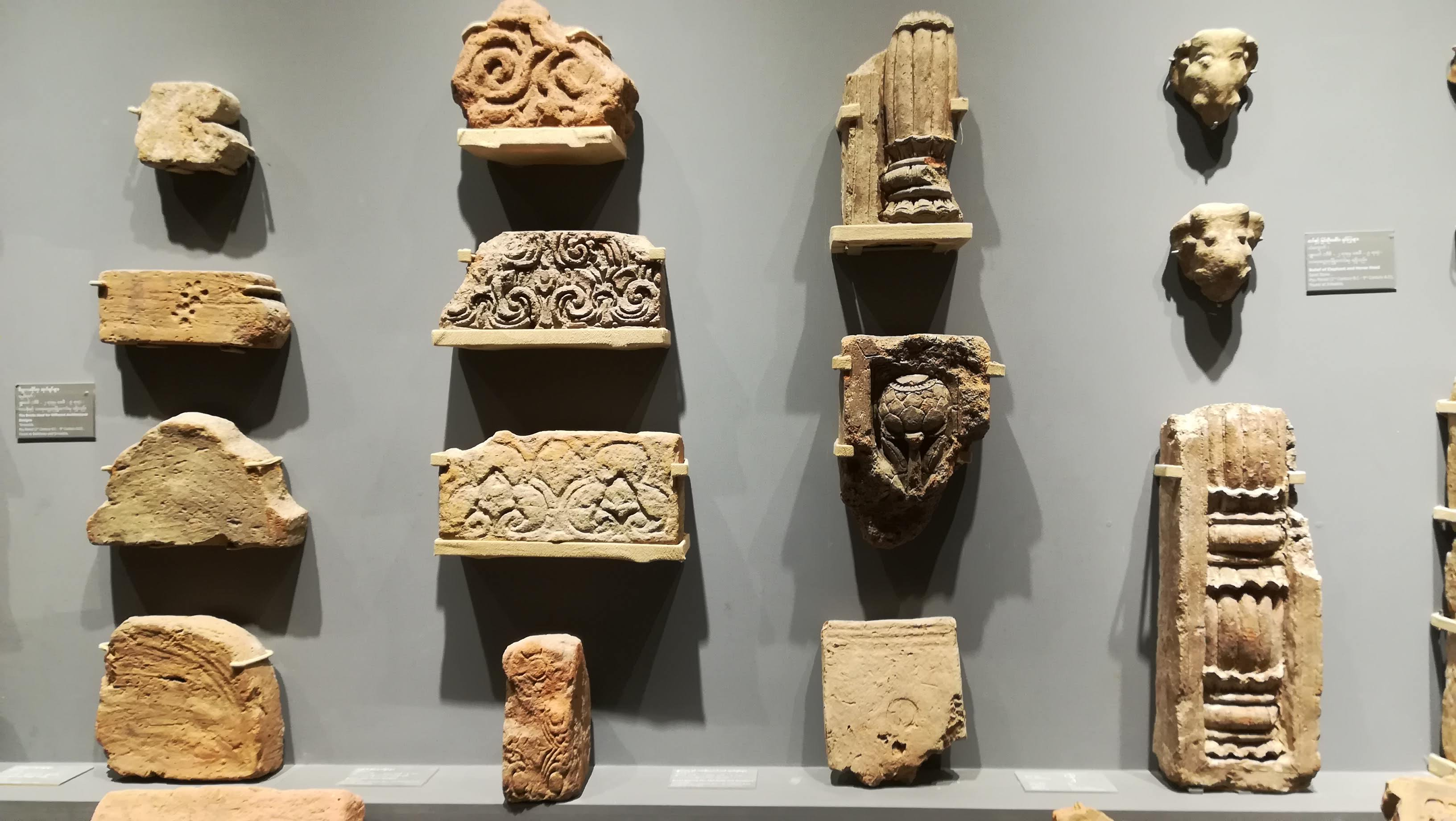
Replicas of terracotta bricks from Sri Ksetra, in National Museum Naypyitaw, Myanmar

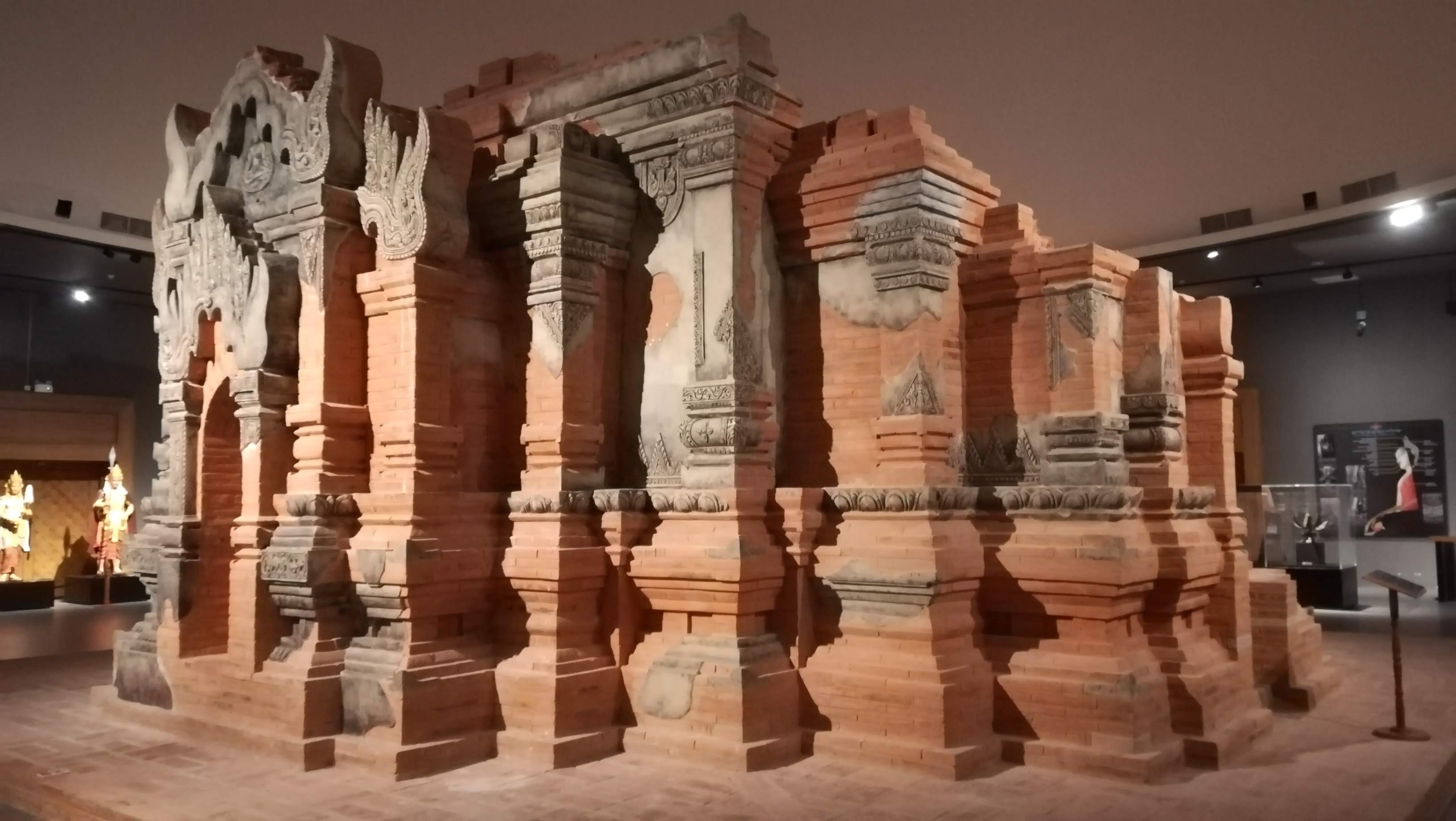
Replica of temple at Bagan, Myanmar

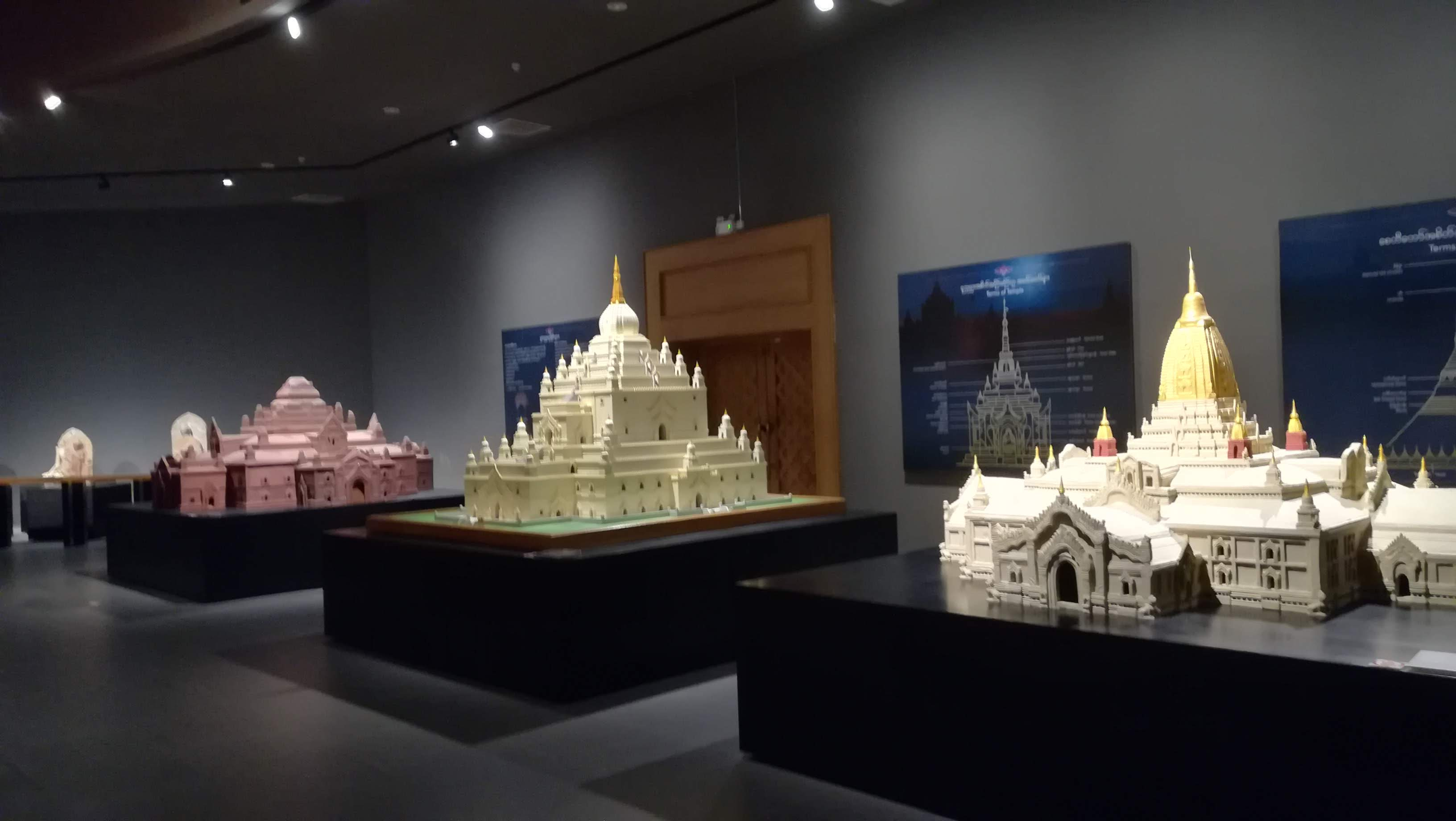
Miniature models of pagodas at Bagan, Myanmar

=== Primates and Fossils Exhibition Room ===
This exhibition room displays fossils of Pondaung formation, petrified plants found in Pondaung formation and Irrawaddy sedimentary formation. The display highlights the fact that Myanmar civilization developed uninterruptedly and Myanmar is one of the original places of homo sapiens. Anthropologist the world over agree that Myanmar's humanoid primate display at the exhibition room is one of the most preeminent collection of anthropoid primates.

=== Prehistoric Period Exhibition Room ===
In this exhibition room, tools, weapons and utensils from Myanmar Stone Age, Bronze Age and Iron Age are displayed. Miniature replicas of Padah-Lin Caves are displayed with supporting special lighting and models. The center piece of the display is a miniature replica of the Bronze Age excavation site, with supporting objects, such as pots, urns, beads and bronze weapons.

=== Protohistoric Period Exhibition Room ===
Small scale models and architectural elements of UNESCO's World Heritage listed Halin, Beikthano and Sri Ksetra Pyu cities and other early Myanmar city states from all over the country are on show in this room. Moreover, five Pyu figurines, as well as gold, silver, bronze and earthen artifacts from excavated sites are displayed in this exhibition room.

=== Historic Period Exhibition Room ===
In this exhibition room, miniature replicas of religious structures, architecture, cultural artifacts and religious objects are displayed. The center piece of the display is Bagan architecture, showing religious buildings, wall paintings, frescoes, masonry and ceramic works.

=== Lion Throne Exhibition Room ===
This large hall is dedicated to a complete replica of the only existing Lion Throne of the kings of Burma, along with replicas of royal as well as non-royal regalia.

=== Myanmar Art Gallery ===
The display of Myanmar paintings includes old traditional paintings, wall paintings of successive eras, Jataka epic paintings and masterpieces of important artists. It is divided into old genre paintings, classic, modern and contemporary paintings.

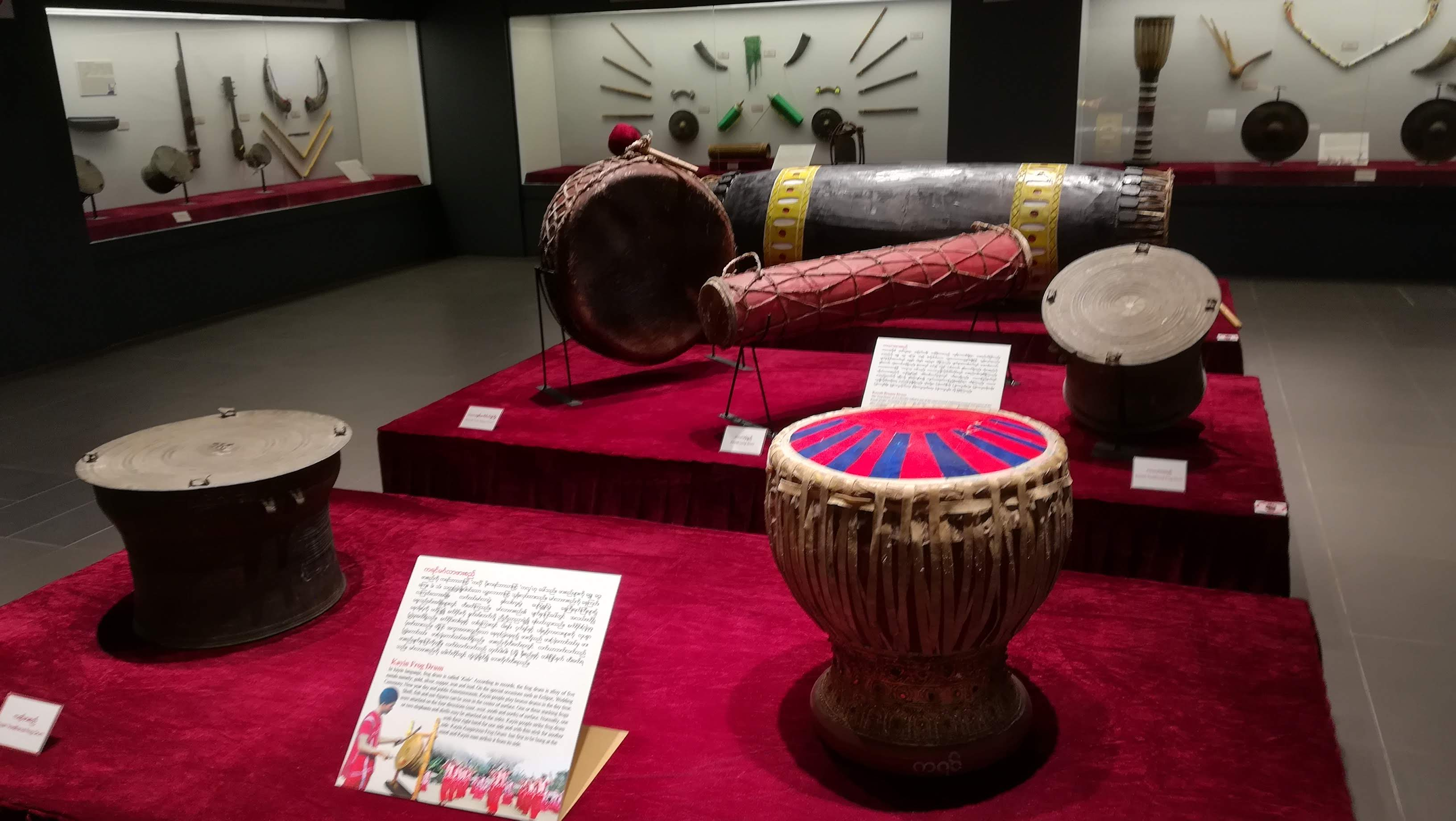
Traditional musical instruments of different ethnic groups in Myanmar

=== Myanmar Performing Arts Exhibition Room ===
This exhibition room displays Myanmar dramatic art, a Myanmar traditional orchestra and a miniature theatre stage according to tradition. Myanmar traditional musical instruments, and various musical instruments of Kachin, Kayah, Kayin, Chin, Bama, Mon, Rakhine and Shan national ethnic groups are also displayed.

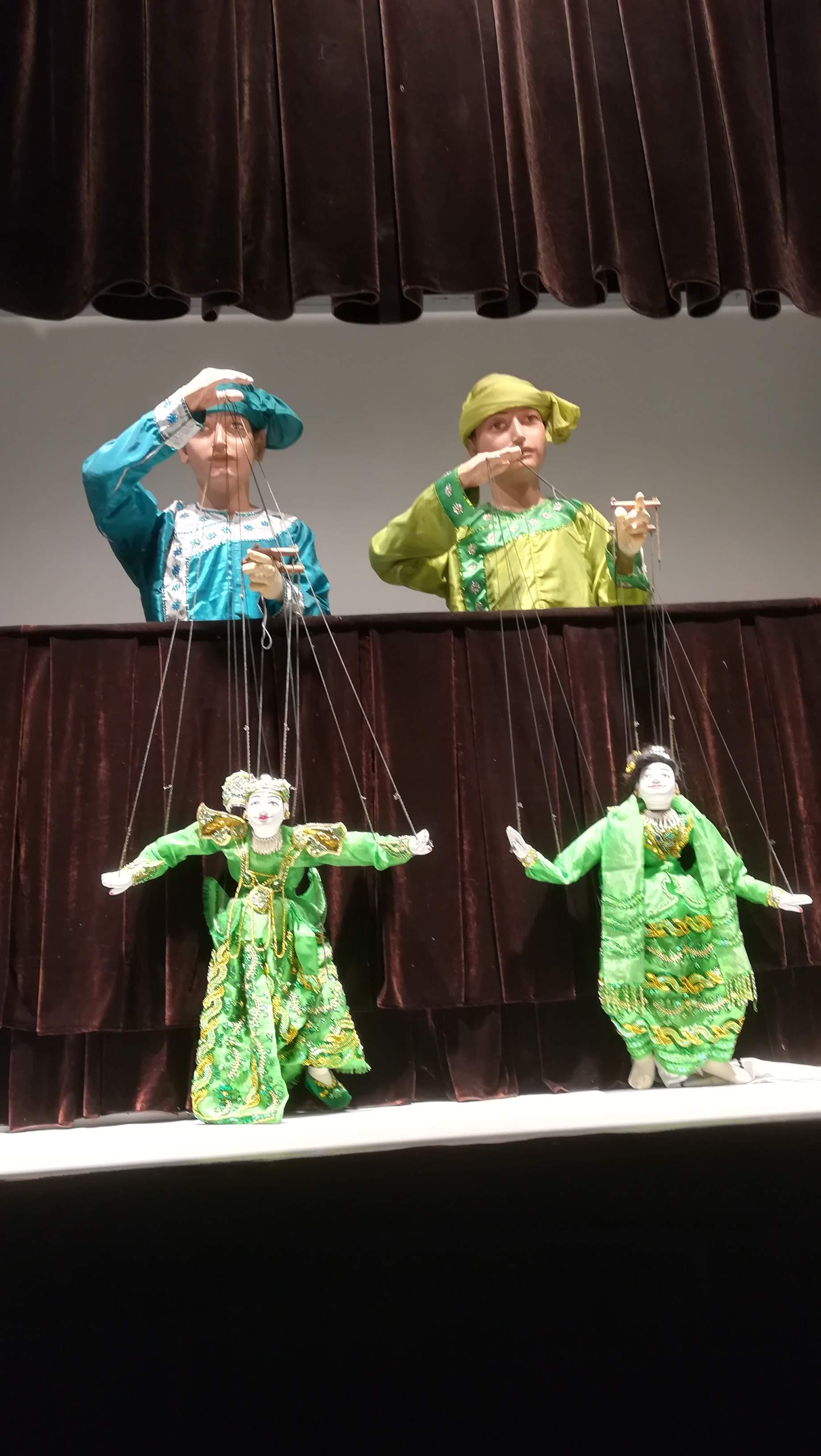
Puppeteers and marionettes (Yoke thé)

=== Arts and Crafts Exhibition Room ===
This room focuses on traditional arts and crafts, such as artistic gold or silver smithing, bronze casting, masonry and bricklaying, making sculptures of stone, metal or wood, as well as painting and lacquerware.

=== ASEAN Exhibition Room ===
Displays of traditional costumes, musical instruments, landmarks and other items of ASEAN countries

=== Children Discovery Exhibition Room ===
Natural history, Myanmar history and cultural activities such as traditional games and festivals are exhibited for children.

== See also ==
- List of structures and infrastructure affected by the 2025 Myanmar earthquake
- National Museum of Myanmar in Yangon
- List of museums in Myanmar
