= San Win (painter) =

Burmese painter

- Born: 1905; British Burma
- Died: 1981 (aged 75–76); Myanmar
- Education: Burma Art Club, Goldsmiths College, Columbia University
- Known for: Painting
- Movement: Rangoon School
- Awards: Wunna Kyawhtin, Fulbright/Smith-Mundt Scholarship (1952-53)

San Win (Burmese: စံဝင်း; 1905–1981) was a painter who is renowned in Burma as the first Burmese painter to embrace impressionism as his chief style of depiction. He is also well known as a devoted and tireless government official who presided over art programs in Burma.

== Early life ==
While still an adolescent, San Win was adopted by Martin Ward, a professor of physics at Rangoon University during the British colonial period in Burma. Ward was a hobby painter and the founder of the Burma Art Club (BAC) when it first began operation in 1913. The BAC was initially established to meet the needs of the British community in Rangoon for weekend painting sessions; however, its agenda became more and more ambitious, and young Burmese artists such as Ba Nyan and San Win became members of the club and availed themselves of its training. In 1920, Ba Nyan was sent to London on a colonial stipend where he was taught European styles of oil painting in more academic and professional settings. When Ba Nyan returned to Burma permanently in 1930, he passed on his accomplished painting skills to many other Burmese painters. While San Win was never one of Ba Nyan's official apprentices, it is certain that San Win observed Ba Nyan's techniques closely and learned from him.

== Career as a teacher and art official ==
San Win graduated from Rangoon University late, in 1931, at the age of 26. Following graduation, he became a high school art teacher, and later, in 1932 or 1933, he became an art lecturer at the Teacher's Training College, where by 1934, he had risen to the position of chief of art teachers. In about the same year, he accepted a position as an art official in the Department of Education. In 1939, when the State School of Art and Music opened, he became its first principal. During the World War II years, like many of the major painters of Burma, he remained active, working as an instructor at the Institute of Art, established by the Japanese during their period of war occupation in Burma.

== Travel and study overseas ==
From 1948-51, San Win studied art education at Goldsmiths, University of London (formerly Goldsmiths College), and later studied at Columbia University from 1952-53 as a Fulbright/Smith-Mundt Scholar. After returning to Burma, he became a deputy minister of art education. He was subsequently awarded a Wunna Kyaw Htin, the highest title that can be bestowed upon an individual in Burma for civil service. In 1960-61, San Win had further opportunities to travel overseas on a UNESCO cultural exchange program, in which he visited and studied art education in England, the USA, Italy, France, Japan, Hong Kong, Thailand, and perhaps other countries.

== Innovator of Burmese impressionism ==
Despite his heavy responsibilities as a teacher and art official, San Win managed to produce a healthy amount of his work in his life, and he would be regarded by almost any scholar of 20th century Burmese painting as one of the top dozen or so painters of his time. He is particularly known for advancing impressionism in Burma. Thein Han, the writer, not the painter, said of him, "In landscapes whose contrasts of light and shade sometimes recall the impressionism of Monet, and in occasional figures, U San Win has shown his mastery of the tonal values of color." San Win introduced a form of impressionism that was unique to Burma, quite unlike European impressionism with it rich flushes of bold, often primary colors. The painting of Burma up to San Win’s time was filled by much more subdued and restrained displays of color, often dark and quite moody. In San Win’s work, the dominant colors are often light or shadowy dark blues, browns, greys and twinges of gold, with splotches of red, pink or yellow in the color of the longyi (the national dress) of small background figures, and often many of them, walking in paths towards temples. There are few landscape paintings by him where the spots of red in longyis do not appear and this can be called a signature element in his work. The color yellow also appears more lightly in his skies but it is not overbearing.

San Win’s chief subject in his work was the famous religious monuments and sites of Burma, though he did also do more secular landscapes of ordinary life. He did very few portraits and very few still life. Almost all of his work is in oil. In some of his oil works, he used the impasto technique where the paint rises off the surface of the painting in thick daubs. Watercolor paintings by San Win are rare. He is also known to have made posters with Bogalay Kyaw Hlaing.

He did paintings of scenes from his trips abroad—-quite a few works of the Egyptian pyramids and at least one London scene of the Thames.

== His legacy ==
San Win, born in 1905, and Ngwe Gaing, born in 1901, can be said to be contemporaries of Ba Nyan, born in 1897, who was the founder of what may be called the Rangoon School. Ba Nyan died early, in his late forties, and the mantle of instruction in the Rangoon School then passed to Ngwe Gaing, San Win, and Thein Han, who was one of Ba Nyan's apprentices. A great many painters of the next generation listed San Win and Ngwe Gaing as their teachers on their resumes. Some of the painters that studied under San Win were Hla Baw, Tun Nyunt, Chit Tun, U Kyi, Kan Nyunt, Khin Maung (Yangon), Thu Ka, Nyan Shein (painter and art historian), Thein Nyunt, Lun Gywe, and Tun Sein.

== Museum and library collections ==
- National Museum of Myanmar
- Singapore Art Museum
- (Yangon) Universities Central Library

== See also ==
- Ba Nyan
- Ngwe Gaing
- Lun Gywe

== Bibliography ==
- Ranard, Andrew (2009). "The Early Rangoon School: The Torch-Bearers". Burmese Painting : A Linear and Lateral History. Silkworm Books. pp. 153–158. ISBN 978-974-9511-76-3.
