= Ngwe Gaing =

Burmese artist (1901–1967)

Alinkar Kyawswa Sayagyi U Ngwe Gaing
- ငွေကိုင်
- Self portrait
- Born: 1901; Myeik, British Burma
- Died: 1967 (aged 65–66)
- Known for: Painting
- Movement: Rangoon School
- Awards: Alinga Kyaw Zwa

Ngwe Gaing (Burmese: ငွေကိုင် [ŋwè ɡàɪɰ̃]; 1901–1967), known honorifically as Sayagyi U Ngwe Gaing, was a Burmese artist who worked in both oil and watercolor. After the death of his teacher Ba Nyan, he was recognized as the greatest living painter in Myanmar. He had great influence on the next generation of artists, and his works are now highly sought after.

== Life ==
Of Burmese Chinese ancestry, Ngwe Gaing was born in Myeik and was raised in Dawei. He was initially self-taught and then improved his skills via an American correspondence painting course. He was forced to work at a number of menial jobs until he was able to support himself as an artist. He was first taught by Po Aung and later by Ba Ohn and Ba Sein, finally becoming a pupil of the famous artist Ba Nyan, after Ba Nyan returned from England in 1930. Ngwe Gaing, however, was not a formal live-in apprentice of Ba Nyan, rather studying with Ba Nyan on weekends in his free time.

With Ba Nyan's death in 1945, Ngwe Gaing was recognized as Burma's leading artist. During a drive to stamp out corruption in the post-independence period, he collaborated with the cartoonist Ba Gyan to produce a series of powerful and effective posters. In 1952 he was sent to England for a year, where he painted copies of Burmese antiquities in the Victoria & Albert Museum. In 1953, he was given the title Alinga Kyawzwa, the highest title that can be bestowed on an artist in Burma. In his private life, Ngwe Gaing was also a well known alchemist and clairvoyant. He was an honest, hardworking and unassuming person.

== Work ==
Ngwe Gaing was a prolific and versatile painter who worked in both oil and watercolour (both transparent and gouache), and he also did pencil drawings. His subjects comprised a wide range—historical paintings, landscapes, portraits, and still life. His oil paintings were meticulous in their attention to detail. They typically used heavily but carefully applied brush strokes, in the impasto style, and an array of complex colour designs.

According to the artist Min Naing, he excelled in his choice of "poster subjects and settings". Another commentator, speaking of his series of large historical panels, said his power perhaps showed to better advantage in easel works such as the romantic "Recluse in the Forest" or a graceful portrait of one of Burma's classical dancers. He painted stage settings for films on traditional themes before the war, and when there was a vogue for stage plays after World War II, he painted stage settings for the makeshift Myaing Theatre in the Kandawgyi Park. Some of his paintings were huge, up to 20 by 60 feet (6.1 m × 18.3 m), such as a work he executed in 1963 for the first Workers Conference.

He painted portraits of notable people such as President Ba U, film star Wah Wah Win Shwe and film director Shumawa U Kyaw. His mnemonic powers in Burma, in which he painted portraits of subjects from memory, were famous in Burma, although he is also known to have started a painting from a photograph and then only require the model for the final stages. He made a series of paintings of historic events, including "The Battle of Shwedaung", "The Flag Hoisting Ceremony on Independence Day", "The Panlong Accord" and "the Nay Thurein Congress". Other works depicted scenes of the Jataka tales, and events in the life of the Buddha. He traveled widely in Burma to find subjects, making sketches that he would later paint in oils or watercolours, often scenes of the daily life of ordinary people and particularly portraits of Burma's many ethnic peoples. The latter subject was a major enterprise which he embarked upon.

== Legacy ==
The Shan State Museum holds two of his classic works: "The Hopong Springs" and "The Stately Procession of the Hpaung-Daw-Oo Buddha Images". The National Museum in Yangon displays other masterpieces including "the Isle of Myeik", "Scenic Ranaung", "The Inlay Floating Bazaar", "Scenic Environs of Dawei", "Maungmagan" and "Some of our Ethnic Brethren". His last work was a series of scenes from the Jatakas for the "Shwe Mokhti" pagoda in Dawei, where they hang in the covered passageways to the pagoda.

Works by Ngwe Gaing are also held in the Singapore Art Museum and other prominent regional collections.

Ngwe Gaing is considered one of the great masters of modern Burmese painting. He made an outstanding contribution through his versatility, technical skill and influence on a generation of Burmese painters. In the post-WWII years, many painters sought instruction from Ngwe Gaing, packing his studio to watch him work, just as painters had flocked to Ba Nyan in the pre-war years. Among the painters influenced by Ngwe Gaing were Myat Kyaw, San Win, Hla Shein, Ko Lay, Hla Maung Gyi, Nann Wai, Thein, Han Tin, San Pe, M. Tin Aye, and Lun Gywe.

== Museum and Library Collections ==
- National Museum of Myanmar
- Singapore Art Museum
- (Yangon) Universities Central Library
- Tatmadaw [Defense Services] Museum, Yangon

== See also ==
- Ba Nyan
- San Win

== Bibliography ==
- Ranard, Andrew (2009). "The Early Rangoon School: The Torch-Bearers". Burmese Painting : A Linear and Lateral History. Silkworm Books. pp. 136–152. ISBN 978-974-9511-76-3.
- Min Naing (1974). U Ba Nyan: His Life and His Paintings (in Burmese). Sarpay Beikman.
