= San Win (historian) =

Burmese historian and archaeologist (1947–2021)

Historian and archaeologist San Win
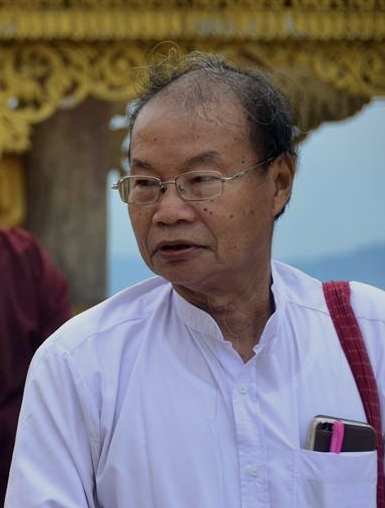
- Born: San Win; October 28, 1947; Hpyuba village, Paung Township, Myanmar
- Died: July 20, 2021 (aged 73); Shwepyitha Township, Yangon
- Occupation: Assistant Director (Retired) Historical Research Department
- Spouse: Daw Aye Than

San Win (28 October 1947 – 20 July 2021) was a Mon historian and archaeologist in Burma and he was an assistant director at Historical Research Department in Myanmar. His best-known works are in the fields of Research on Suvannabhumi which was presented with Myanmar National Literature Award in 2013.

== Life ==
San Win was born in the Hpyuba village, Paung Township, Thaton District, British Burma on October 28, 1947. His parents were U Tun Tin and Daw Kyin Myaint. They belonged to the Mon race. San Win attended Hpyuba Primary School, Yinnyein Secondary School and Paung High School and No. 1 Moulmein High School. In 1964 he dropped his high school and worked as a primary school teacher. During 1970–1975 he attended Teacher Training Institute, Moulmein and when he finished at the institute, he taught at Secondary Schools.

While he was working as a secondary school teacher he went to examination for high school as private candidate, and he passed the examination in 1975. He entered Rangoon University in 1976, and received bachelor's degrees in history in 1979, respectively and an MA in history in 1988. In 1995 he received Diploma in archaeology from Rangoon University. In 1992 he attended Record Management Training at National Archives of India, New Delhi, India. From 1998 to 2000 he studied Thai Language and History of Thai-Myanmar relations in Chulalongkorn University, Thailand.

== Family ==
San Win married Daw Aye Than in 1969. They have one son and four daughters. When he died in 2021, he had four grandchildren.

== Career ==
San Win began to work as primary school teacher in 1986. After he graduated from Moulmein Teacher Training Institute in 1975 he taught at Secondary Schools. San Win became a lecturer in University of Rangoon at Department of History in 1983. From 1987 to 1994 he worked as Researcher at the department. When the university of Rangoon initiated the Department of Archaeology in July 1994 he became lecturer of the department. From 1996 he was appointed Assistant Researcher for all Universities in Myanmar and then assistant director at Historical Research Department until he took retirement in 2007. After retirement from 2013 he worked part-time such as in Department of Minister of Religious Affairs and Culture, Department of Historical Research and a lecturer for Department of Archaeology for Ph.D. students.

== Academic career ==
Along with his career as historian and archaeologist he wrote many articles and books. His best-known works are in the fields of Research on Suvannabhumi which was presented with Myanmar National Literature Award in 2013.

== Publications ==
- (in Burmese) Research on Suvannabhumi (သုဝဏ္ဏဘူမိ သုတေသန) Yangon, 2013.
- (in Burmese) Research on Ancient City of Raññadesa Kyaikkatha (ရာမညဒေသ ကျိုက္ကသာမြို့ဟောင်း သုတေသနခရီး) Mawlamyine, 2018.
- (in Burmese) အသောကခေတ်၊ သုဝဏ္ဏဘူမိတိုင်း သာသနာပြု သီတင်းသုံးခဲ့ရာ ကုသီနာရုံတောင်၊ သောဏုတ္ထရဗိမာန်တော်၊ 2020.
- (in Burmese) The Collection of U San Win's Research articles (ဦးစံဝင်း၏ လက်ရွေးစင်စာတမ်းများ) Yangon, 2020.

== Death ==
On 20 July 2021, San Win died of COVID-19 at his home in Shwepyitha Township, Yangon.
