= Burma Art Club =

Art institution in Rangoon, early 20th century

Burma Art Club or BAC (Burmese: မြန်မာပန်းချီအသင်း) was an art institution in Rangoon (Yangon), Burma which was established in 1913 or 1914 or even 1918 according to various sources. The club was located on the premises of the Rangoon Government High School. It afforded a twofold opportunity: first, it was a means to develop the British colonial painters' own talents and second, they were able to teach Western style painting to others in Burma.

BAC was founded by amateur British colonial painters. This included Kenneth Martin Ward, Professor of Physics at Rangoon University; Martin Jones, Railways Commissioner who drew for the Rangoon Times, and E.G.N. Kinch, the principal of Saint Methew Teachers Training College. They were assisted by Commissioner Hla Aung, his wife Mya May, and young Burmese artists such as Ba Zaw, Ba Nyan, Tha Dun, Tun Hla, Saya Saung and Ba Kyi.

== History ==
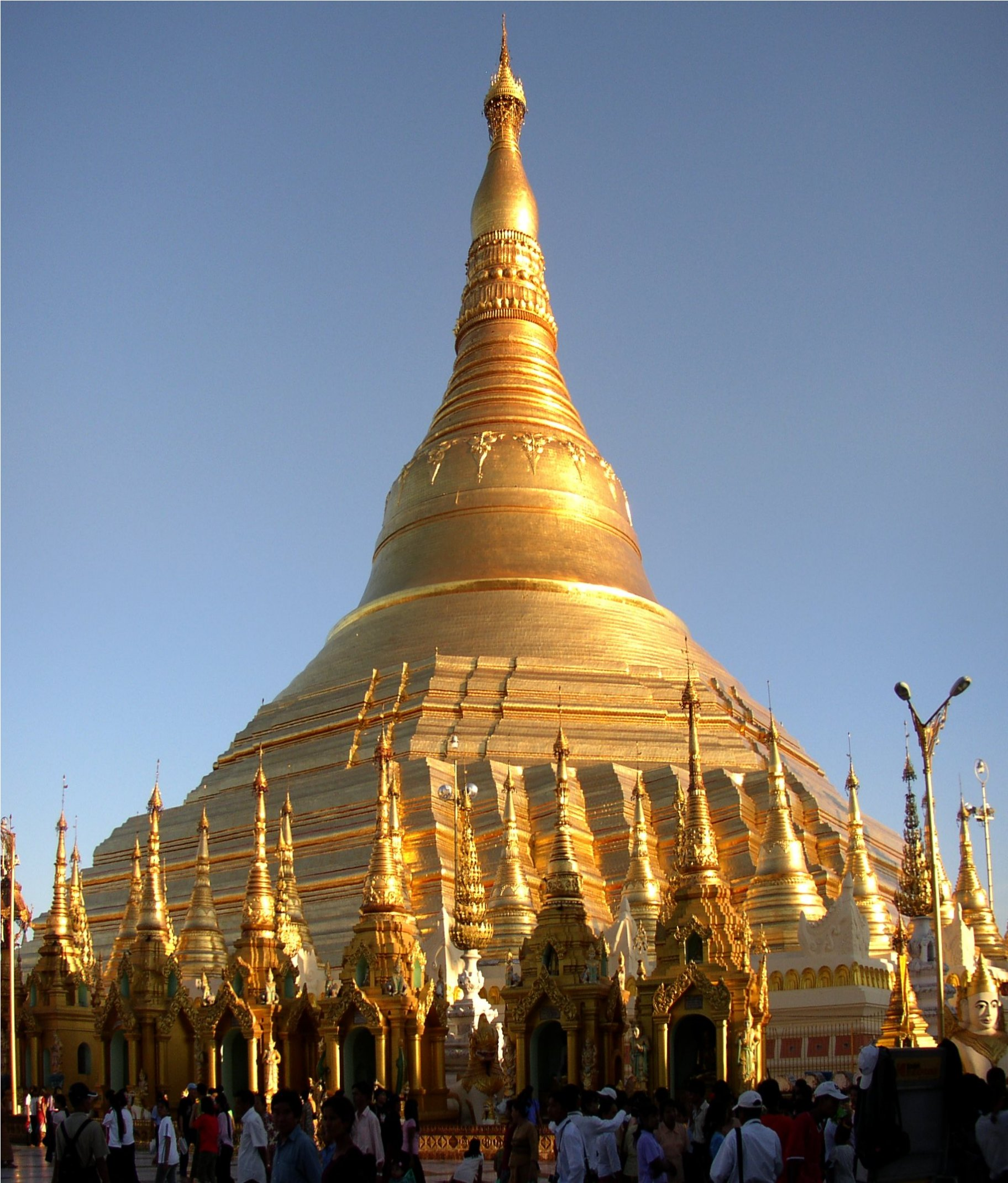
The Burma Art Club participated in the Japanese Post-War Art Exhibition at the Shwedagon Pagoda

=== Early years ===
Ward became BAC's first president with architect Tha Tun acting as Secretary. Hla Aung and Mya May arranged for the teachers and students to stay at their residence. They also allowed Ward to teach art at the Boys Buddhist School, which was owned by them. Daw Mya May became known as "the mother of Myanmar artists". BAC offered several courses such as still-life and portrait painting, as well as outdoor and indoor paintings on weekends. While the Burmese painters affiliated with the club accepted realistically painted nudes as art, very few of them attempted to paint nudity themselves. The club was known to concentrate on system and method, earning it the nickname of "Labyrinth of Technique" amongst those in the art circle.

In 1920, the school expanded its classes, Ward himself taught oil painting, and Ba Nyan, developer of the "Rangoon School", became an art instructor in basic design. In that decade, club member painters, Ba Nyan and Ba Zaw, were able study in London at the Royal College of Art. Also in the 1920s, the founding members introduced students to British cartoon art. Upon Ba Nyan's return to Burma, he brought back a bold style of oil painting while Ba Zaw returned with a stylized form of transparent watercolor painting.

=== Later years ===
Though art instruction continued at the club until World War II, some painters such as Ba Nyan began a new form instruction at their homes, that of master-apprentice training. The school was important in launching the careers of talented young artists such as Ba Nyan. In 1939, Ba Nyan himself became principal of the Art School.

In 1944, during the Japanese occupation, Ba Nyan led a group of artists that opened the school's successor, the Burmese Academy of Art, becoming the principal of the academy with Ba Kyi and San Win as instructors. Two years later, an English Army art club and the Burma Art Club participated together in the Japanese Post-War Art Exhibition (Services Art Exhibition) at the Shwedagon Pagoda.

== Notable alumni ==
Many young Burmese artists learned to draw and paint from the British artists. Those who went on to become famous national artists include Ba Gyan, Hein Sunn, Saya Mya, Ba Zaw, and Ohn Lwin. Ba Gale ("Shwetalay"), was the club's most famous alumnus. His first published cartoon appeared in the Yangon University annual in 1915, while he was a college student there. In the same year, Ba Gale's work was published in the Rangoon Times, becoming the first newspaper to publish a cartoon by a Burmese artist. In March 1917, the very first issue of Thuriya ("The Sun"), a paper run by young nationalists, carried a Ba Gale cartoon.
