= Aung Soe Min =

Burmese Poet

- အောင်စိုးမင်း
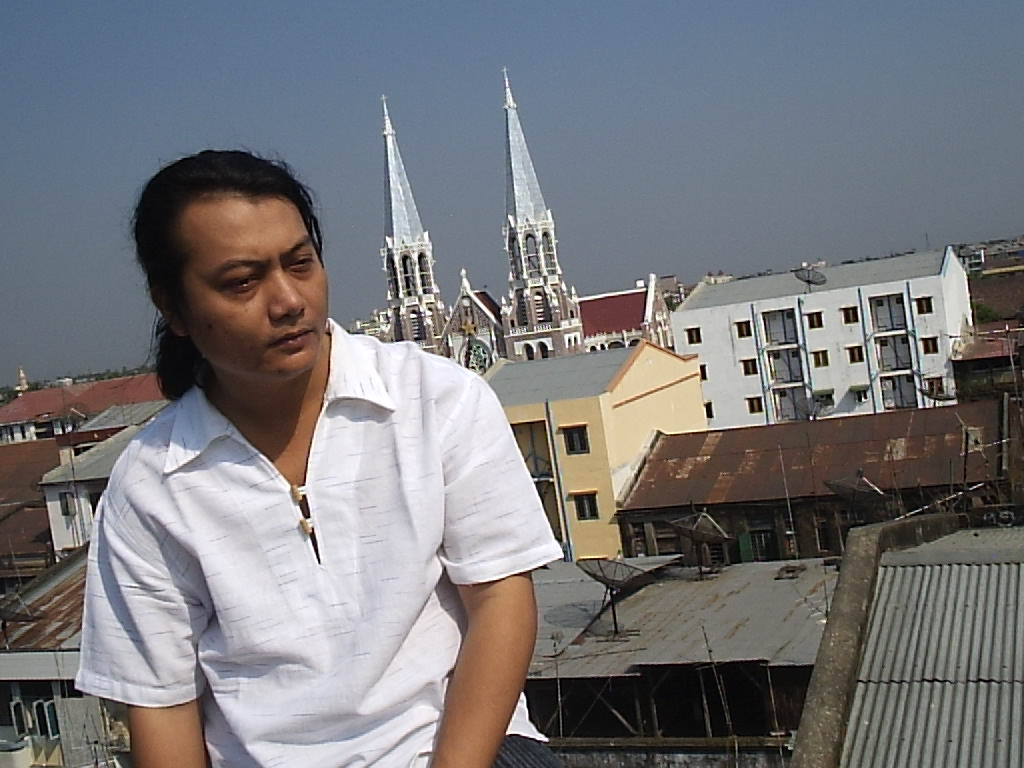
- Born: November 1970 (age 55); Kyaukpadaung, Burma
- Education: Government Technical Institute, Chauk
- Occupations: Poet; musician; publisher

Aung Soe Min (Burmese: အောင်စိုးမင်း, born November 1970) is a Burmese poet, musician, publisher, artist, magazine editor, film director and gallerist. Aung Soe Min is living and working in Yangon, Myanmar.

== Career ==
Aung Soe Min is known for his artistic advocacy and attempts to fight against censorship and freedom of expression. His projects include: the Pansodan Gallery and Archives (founded in 2008), Pansurya, and Pansodan Scene.

=== Publishing and editing ===
He served as interim editor of Thint Bawa Magazine in 1996. He founded Thet Daung Yaungzin Journal in 2002. He founded New Spectator Magazine in 2004. He founded Pansodan Art & Culture Friday Journal in 2013.

=== Art ===
Aung Soe Min and Nance Cunningham founded Pansodan Gallery in 2008. In 2013, they opened an exhibition, performance, and even space, Pansodan Scene. In 2015 he opened a photography museum which later became Pansuriya, and an art centre and restaurant.

Pansodan Gallery has sought to increase the international profile of Myanmar art, and has collaborated with Lindenmuseum in Stuttgart for an exhibition about depictions of religion in art from ancient times to today, and has had numerous exhibitions in other countries, including Singapore, Thailand, Australia, the USA, France, the Inside Stories art exhibition at the 2011 Brighton Festival in the UK, and others.

A collection of Aung Soe Min's paintings were published in the book 'Mind Drops'.

=== Open History and Public Memory ===
Aung Soe Min gave a TEDx talk in 2016 on the history of Burma, and the importance of public memory of these times. He first developed the concept in an exhibition about Kyauktada Township. He has also worked alongside the Yangon Heritage Trust to document local heritage sites in Yangon. Since that time he has continued to develop the concept of 'open history', and in 2018 published a book titled "Open History Project" (လူထု အမှတ်သညာပွဲတော်). In 2018 another larger Open History festival was held in Magwe. In 2019, Open History festivals were held in Hpa-an and Dawei.

In 2020, he partnered with Yangon University's History Department to create an Open History Festival for the centenary of the university.

Aung Soe Min gave several talks at the Habitat III conference in Quito, Ecuador in 2016.
