= Ba Nyan =

Burmese painter (1897–1945)

U Ba Nyan
- ဦးဘဉာဏ်
- Self-portrait, 1937
- Born: 1897; Pantanaw, British Burma
- Died: 12 October 1945 (aged 47–48); Ga Doe Village, Mawlamyine
- Education: Burma Art Club; Royal College of Art (London); Yellow Door School
- Known for: Painting
- Movement: Rangoon School

Ba Nyan (Burmese: ဘဉာဏ်, pronounced [ba̰ ɲàɰ̃]; 1897 – 12 October 1945), known honorifically as U Ba Nyan, was a Burmese painter who has been called the greatest name in modern painting in Myanmar. His oil paintings were quiet and not academic in their style, but display occasional flashes of virtuosity and brilliance in bold, impasto brushstroke and skillful handling of the medium.

== Early life ==
Ba Nyan was the fourth of six children, born in Pantanaw in 1897. He displayed his talent for painting at an early age, and for four years studied the skills of applying color and painting traditional motifs under Po Maung. He was noticed by the Maubin district officer who persuaded the government to support him in studying at the Norman School in Mawlamyaing under Saya Ba Lwin. He was then appointed assistant drawing master at the Yangon High School.

== Success ==
The Burma Art Club, founded in 1913, assisted in the development of Burmese artists, and in 1921 helped him go to the Royal College of Art in London. Later he moved to the Yellow Door Fine Arts School, where he received personal instruction from the artist Frank Spenlove-Spenlove (1867-1933). He returned in 1925 full of enthusiasm about western oil painting techniques, and began depicting the Burmese countryside in the style of conservative British landscape artists. In 1928 he went back to London, and on this visit became acquainted with the famous muralist Sir Frank Brangwyn and the head of the Royal Art Academy, Sir William Rothenstein, who helped him to take part in art exhibitions.

He also met King George V in person, after he had saved one of the king's relatives from drowning. When he returned to Burma in 1930, his experience in London had earned him a formidable reputation and he was able to mount one-man art exhibitions and received various commissions from the government and wealthy patrons.

== Back in Burma ==
U Ba Oo (1933)

In 1935 he married Sein Khaing. In 1939 he became principal of the Art School for Myanmar students. In 1944, during the Japanese occupation, Ba Nyan led a group of artists that opened an Institute of Art, becoming the principal of the academy with Ba Kyi and San Win as instructors. During this period, the war-time prime minister of Burma, U Ba Maw, traveled to Japan on official business and presented two of Ba Nyan's paintings to Kuniaki Koiso, the Japanese Prime Minister, and a third painting, a landscape of the Shwedagon Pagoda, entitled Night of the Shwedagon, to Emperor Hirohito. By those who saw the last painting, it was considered one of Ba Nyan's most powerful works. Presumably, it is still in the Collection of the Japanese Imperial Household.

Another masterpiece by Ba Nyan is his oil painting U Ba Oo (1933) of his father, done with heavy use of chiaroscuro and impasto techniques, on permanent display in the National Museum of Myanmar.

== Legacy ==
Ba Nyan played a key role in introducing western techniques to Myanmar artists. He also had a significant influence on the manner in which teaching was handed down in Burma for he retained the master-apprentice form of instruction, which had always been a feature of the older more Traditional schools of painting in Burma. Ba Nyan taught six pupils full-time who lived with him in his home: Aye Maung, Thein Han, Thein Tan, Myat Kyaw, Ba Kyi, and Aung Khin, in that order, although Myat Kyaw's period of study with Ba Nyan was short. As Myat Kyaw's interest in painting was in the commercial rather than fine-art vein, Ba Nyan sent Myat Kyaw for further study to Ngwe Gaing, whose interest in the early years was in commercial work. Thein Han, Ba Kyi, and Aung Khin became major painters of Burma, and Myat Kyaw, if not a major painter of Burma, became a major figure and force in the Burmese painting community. Ngwe Gaing and Bogalay Kyaw Hlaing studied with Ba Nyan on an ad hoc basis; but there is no question that Ngwe Gaing's three or four years of studying with Ba Nyan on weekends had a large influence on Ngwe Gaing, who became regarded as the leading painter in Burma after Ba Nyan died. Aung Soe also received some exposure to Ba Nyan while both of them were at the Institute of Art during the Japanese occupation period (above), but Aung Soe was very young then, barely 20, and their time together at the Academy was very short. As Aung Soe's path as an intensely modernist (abstract) painter, or as a painter in the Traditional mode, shows no clear influence of Ba Nyan, it is strictly speculation to wonder of the effects Ba Nyan may have had on Aung Soe.

== His death ==
Ba Nyan died on 12 October 1945 in Ga Doe Village, shortly after the end of World War II.

== Museum and library collections ==
- National Museum of Myanmar
- Singapore Art Museum
- (Yangon) Universities Central Library

== See also ==
- M.T. Hla (U Tun Hla)
- Ba Zaw
- Saya Myit

== Bibliography ==
- Ranard, Andrew (2009). "Mood and Methodology: Genesis of the Rangoon School". Burmese Painting : A Linear and Lateral History. Silkworm Books. pp. 91–113. ISBN 978-974-9511-76-3.
- Min Naing (1974). U Ba Nyan: His Life and His Paintings (in Burmese). Sarpay Beikman.
