= Rakhine State Cultural Museum =

- ရခိုင်ပြည်နယ် ယဉ်ကျေးမှုပြတိုက်
- Former name: Arakan State Cultural Museum and Library
- Established: 1955; 71 years ago
- Location: No. 70, Corner of Main Road and Ye Dwin Street, Maw Laik Ward, Sittwe; Rakhine State, Myanmar
- Coordinates: 20.1419°N 92.8992°E
- Type: Cultural museum
- Owner: Ministry of Religious Affairs and Culture (Myanmar)

The Rakhine State Cultural Museum (Burmese: ရခိုင်ပြည်နယ် ယဉ်ကျေးမှုပြတိုက်) is a museum in Myanmar that serves as a repository for the cultural heritage of the Rakhine people, including their history, cultural traditions, and costumes. Located in Sittwe, in Rakhine State, the museum was built in 1990 and opened on 19 February 1996.
