= Frank Spenlove-Spenlove =

Scottish painter

- Born: 24 February 1864; Stirling, Scotland
- Died: 20 April 1933 (aged 69); London, England

John Francis Spenlove-Spenlove (24 February 1864 – 20 April 1933) was a Scottish landscape and figure painter.

== Life and work ==
Spenlove-Spenlove was born in Stirling, Scotland. He painted in both oils and watercolour, and was a member of the Royal College of Art (RCA), Royal Society of British Artists (RBA), Royal Institution (RI) and the Royal Institute of Oil Painters (ROI). From 1886 he exhibited regularly at the Royal Academy, London. He was also known as an author. He was made an honorary member of the Belfast Art Society in June 1904.

In 1896, he founded a successful school of modern art at Beckenham, Kent, called the Yellow Door School of Art. One of his outstanding students was Ba Nyan, a penurious student from Burma who had been sent to England in 1921 to study at the Royal College of Art but soon switched to Spenlove's Yellow Door School where he could focus on oil painting. Spenlove and Ba Nyan developed a close relationship and Spenlove eventually deferred Ba Nyan's fees. When Ba Nyan returned permanently to Burma in 1930, he had a revolutionary impact on Burmese painting, introducing the techniques in Western painting which he had learned from Spenlove and other British painters such Frank Brangwyn.

Autumn Leaves, Belgium, Mercer Art Gallery

The Beggar (The church porch: the world forgotten), 1901-1907

Interior scene, oils

All of Spenlove-Spenlove's paintings show his peculiar skill in the rendering of an atmosphere. Among the best known are:

- Funeral in Holland in Winter (gold medal, The Salon, Paris, 1901)
- Too Late (Musée d'Orsay, Paris)
- The Little White Cross (Manchester Art Gallery)
- In the Shadow of the Church (Manchester Art Gallery)
- Vespers, Holland (1906, Kelvingrove Art Gallery and Museum, Glasgow)
- Grey of the Morn (Guildhall, London)
- Grey of Evening (Ferens Art Gallery, Kingston upon Hull)
- The Hill-Top (1912)

He died in London in 1933, aged 69.
