= J. J. Hilder =

Australian artist

Botany Bay, 1906

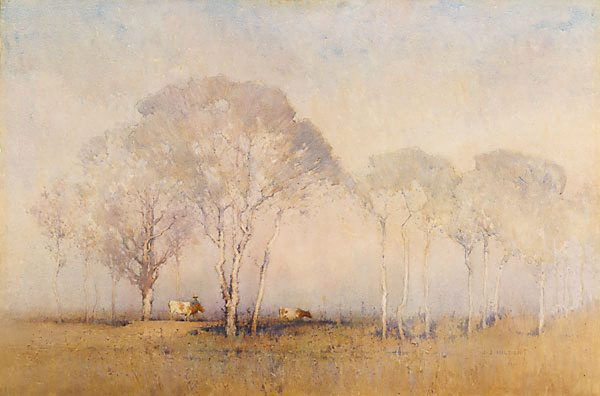
Dry lagoon (1911)

Old Cottage by the Pool, 1917

J. J. Hilder (23 July 1881 – 10 April 1916), also known as Jesse Jewhurst Hilder, was an Australian watercolourist.

== Early life ==
Hilder was born in Toowoomba, Queensland, Australia, the fourth son and eighth child of Henry Hilder, an engineer originally from Sussex. Hilder attended Toowoomba North State School until 1890 when his family moved to Brisbane where he continued his education at Fortitude Valley State School. Hilder spent three years at the Brisbane Grammar School, having won a scholarship at age 13, and passed the junior public examination in 1897.

In 1898 Hilder joined the Brisbane branch of the Bank of New South Wales.

Suffering increasing ill-health, Hilder moved on a number of occasions. He was diagnosed with tuberculosis.

== Career ==
Increasingly focused on his artwork, Hilder began to find more patronage and sales, and exhibited in Melbourne in 1914. Despite continued ill-health he painted throughout the remaining two years of his life, dying on 10 April 1916, at Hornsby, New South Wales, Australia. His elder son was sculptor Bim Hilder. His younger son was artist and author Brett Hilder, although Brett is better known as a Master Mariner.

== Publications ==
- J. J. (Jesse Jewhurst) Hilder, J.J. Hilder: water-colourist (Sydney: Tyrrells, 1916)
- Sydney Ure Smith and Bertram Stevens (eds.), The art of J.J. Hilder (Sydney: Angus & Robertson, 1918)
- J. J. (Jesse Jewhurst) Hilder, Jesse Jewhurst Hilder: anniversary exhibition, 1966 (Brisbane: Queensland Art Gallery, 1960)
