= Mandalay Cultural Museum =

- မန္တလေး ယဉ်ကျေးမှု ပြတိုက်
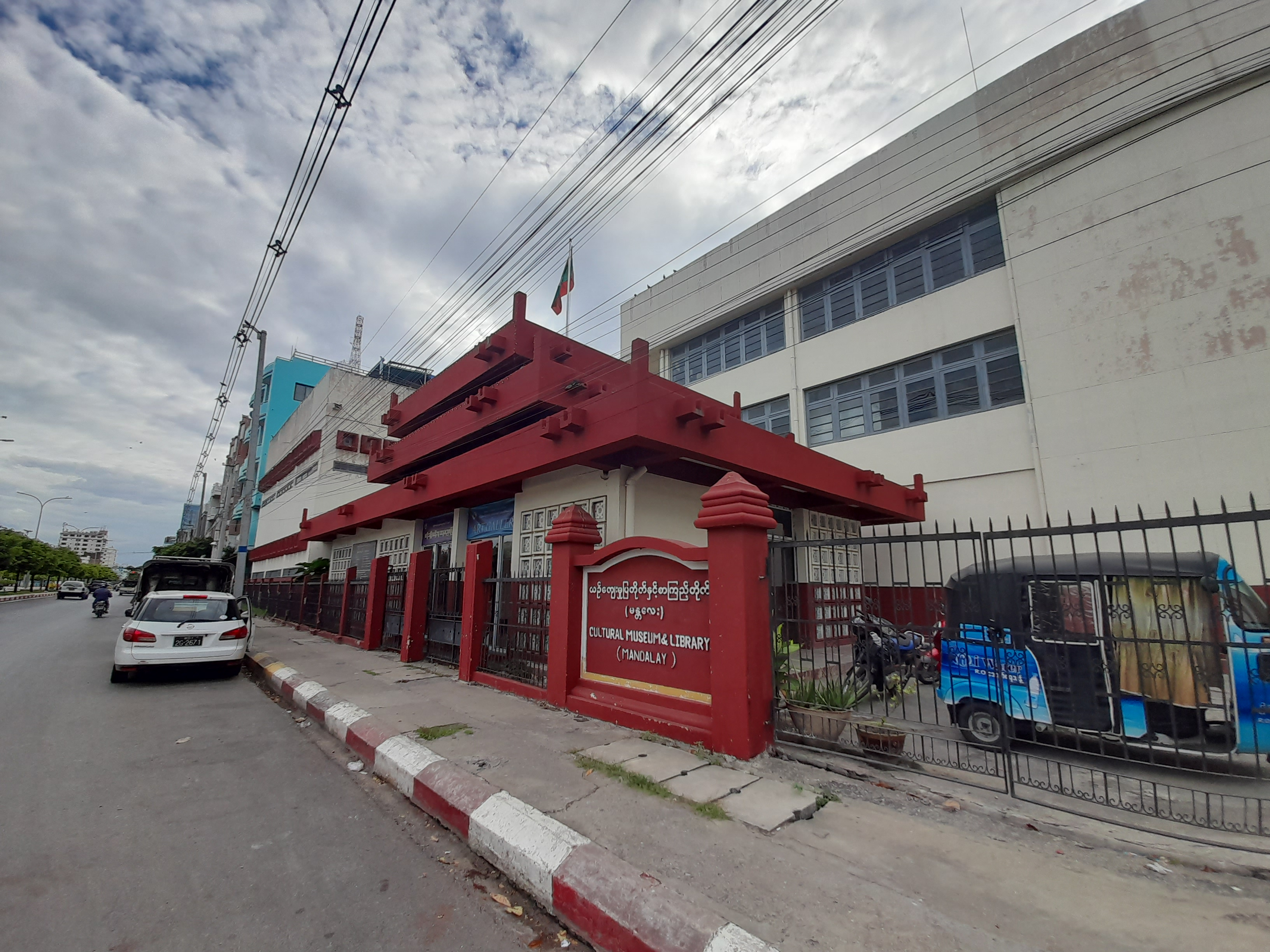
- Location: Mandalay, Myanmar
- Coordinates: 21.985619568563067°N 96.08414523180296°E
- Type: Cultural museum
- Accreditation: Ministry of Religious Affairs and Culture (Myanmar)

The Mandalay Cultural Museum (Burmese: မန္တလေး ယဉ်ကျေးမှု ပြတိုက်) is a museum located at the corner of 80th Road and 24th Street, in Mandalay, Myanmar.

It displays artifacts from monarchs and royal ministers across the centuries, including materials and furniture used by King Mindon and King Thibaw, paintings by royal artist Saya Chone and sculptures.

The museum charges foreign visitors US$2 for entry. For Burmese nationals, the admission fee is 500 kyats for adults and 250 kyats for children.

It is open from 10:00 am to 3:30 pm from Tuesday to Sunday.
