= Min Naing =

Burmese politician

Member of the Amyotha Hluttaw
- Incumbent
- Assumed office 3 February 2016
- Constituency: Sagaing Region № 12

Personal details
- Born: 5 December 1963 (age 62) Leshi Township, Myanmar
- Party: National League for Democracy
- Spouse: Kha Lin Thay
- Children: 1
- Education: nine grade

Min Naing (Burmese: မင်းနိုင်; born 5 December 1963) is a Burmese politician who currently serves as an Amyotha Hluttaw MP for Sagaing Region No. 12 Constituency. He is a member of the National League for Democracy.

== Early life and education ==
Min Naing was born on 5 December 1936 in Leshi Township, Myanmar. He is an ethnic Naga.

== Political career ==
He is a member of the National League for Democracy. In the 2015 Myanmar general election, he was elected as an Amyotha Hluttaw member of parliament and elected representative from Sagaing Region No. 11 parliamentary constituency.
