= National Museum of Myanmar (Yangon) =

National Museum (Yangon)
- အမျိုးသား ပြတိုက်
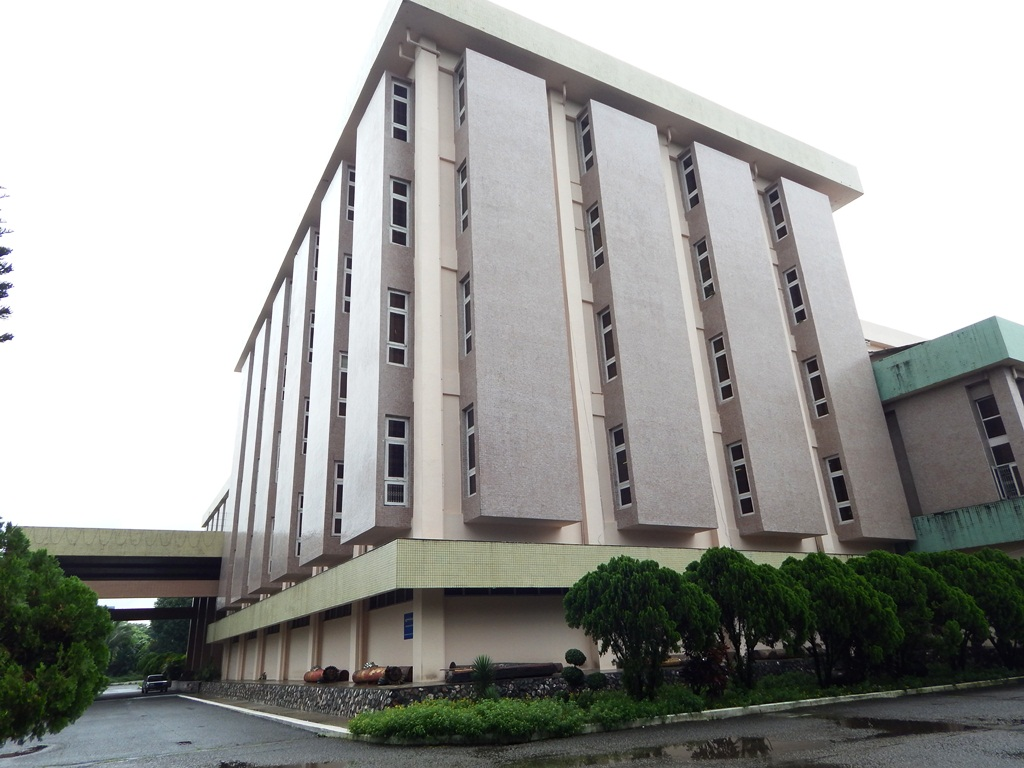
- Established: 1952; 74 years ago
- Location: 66/74 Pyay Road; Dagon 11191, Yangon; Yangon Division, Myanmar
- Coordinates: 16°47′19″N 96°8′33″E
- Type: Museum
- Collection size: 4112
- Visitors: 98,097(2017-2018)
- Owner: Ministry of Religious Affairs and Culture (Myanmar)
- Employees: overall 118 employees
- Public transit access: Pegu Club Bus Stop (Bus No: YBS 21, 39, 65, etc)
- Website: asemus.museum/museum/national-museum-yangon

The National Museum of Myanmar (Yangon), (Burmese: အမျိုးသား ပြတိုက်), located in Dagon, Yangon, is the larger of the two national museums for Burmese art, history and culture in Myanmar. Founded in 1952, the five-storey museum has an extensive collection of ancient artifacts, ornaments, work of art, inscriptions and historic memorabilia, related to history, culture and civilization of Burmese people. The main attraction of the museum is the only surviving original Lion Throne of the Burmese monarchs. There are more than 4,000 permanent objects in the museum.

Public museums in Myanmar are administered by the Ministry of Religious Affairs and Culture and can be classified as national museums, archaeological museums, regional cultural museums, and memorial museums. Furthermore, other kinds of museum are administered under other ministries, like the Defense Services Museum in the capital Naypyidaw, or in the private sector.

The museum is open from 9:30 am to 4:30 pm, except on Mondays and public holidays.

== History ==
The National Museum first opened in June 1952 at the Jubilee Hall on Shwedagon Pagoda Road, Yangon. In 1957, the Royal Lion Throne was relocated to the National Museum for display. In 1968, the museum moved to a larger location at 24/26 Pansodan Street, opening on 8 February 1970. The National Museum moved to its present location in 1996, opening on 18 September 1996.

== Galleries ==
The museum's collections are displayed over the following 14 galleries or halls.

Myanmar (Burmese) Culture
- Myanmar (Burmese) Epigraphy and Calligraphy
- Myanmar (Burmese) Traditional Folk Art
- Myanmar (Burmese) Performing Arts
- Myanmar (Burmese) Art Gallery
- Buddhist Art
- Ethnic Cultures
Myanmar (Burmese) Historic Periods
- Natural History
- Prehistoric Period and Protohistoric Period
- Myanmar (Burmese) Civilization
- Royal Regalia
- Lion Throne
- Yadanabon Period
- Ancient Ornaments
- ASEAN Corner

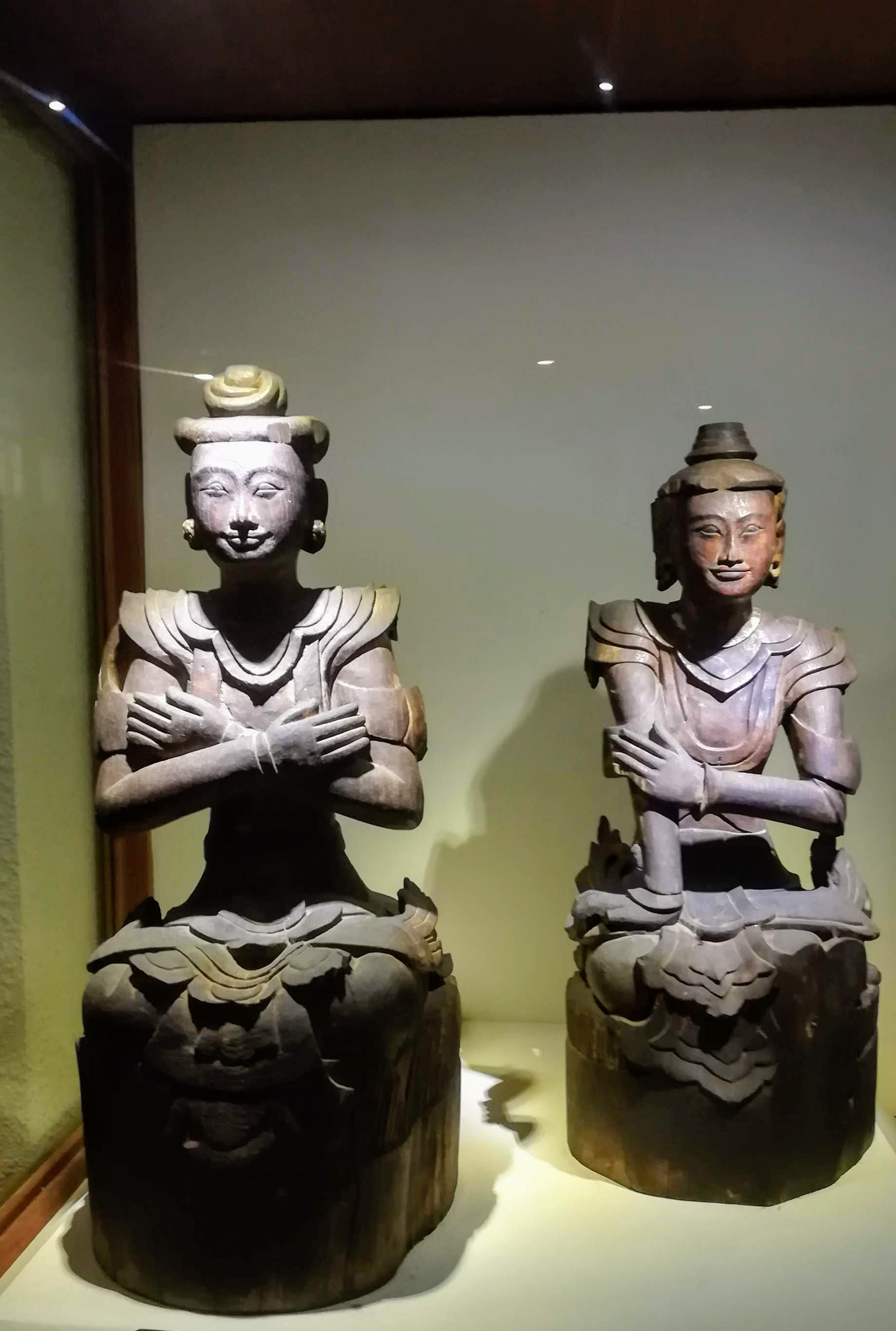
Wooden statues of a king and queen

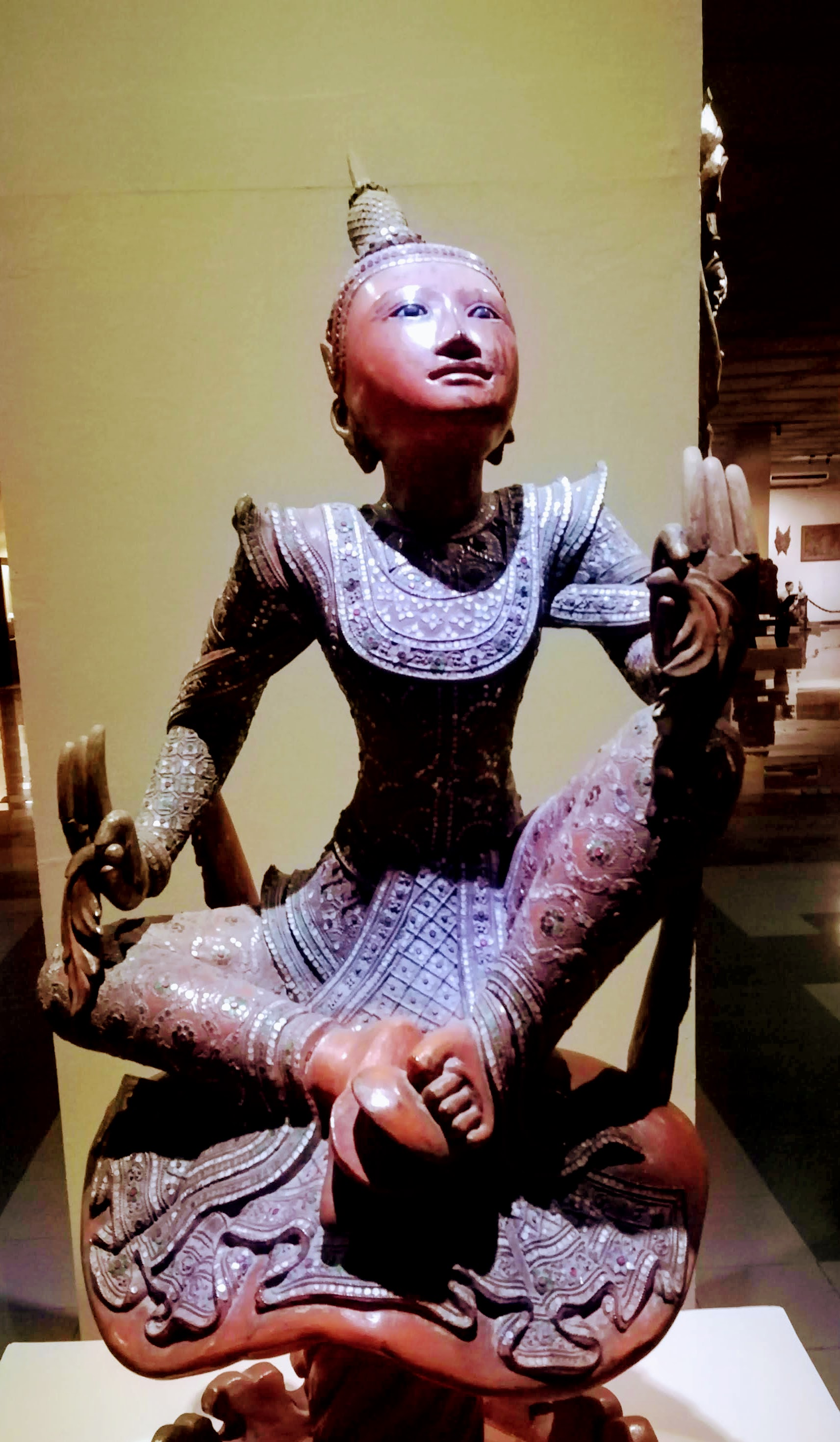
Wooden statue

=== Burmese culture ===
- The Burmese Epigraphy and Calligraphy hall on the ground floor contains exhibits on the origins and development of Burmese script/alphabet throughout history, as well as exhibits on other ancient and ethnic scripts.
- In the Hall of Culture exhibits on Burmese rural life are displayed, covering social, economic and cultural traditions and modes of transport. Examples include a traditional Burmese bullock cart, still in use in many parts of the country, an offering bowl for monks, gilded and wrought with mosaics of semi-precious stones, and personal ornaments and jewelry worn by Burmese people since ancient times.
- The Hall of Arts covers the progress of Burmese art, beginning with the cave paintings of the Stone Age to the Bagan, Innwa, Taungoo, Konbaung and Yadanabon periods and up to contemporary art. Here, works of famous artists are on display and temporary exhibitions are held.
- In the Hall of Performing Arts, there are many musical instruments and an ornate saingwaing (traditional Burmese orchestra), as well as Burmese marionettes used in classical dramas and operas.
- The Hall of Ethnic Culture on the fourth floor shows national dresses and traditional artifacts of various ethnic groups of Myanmar.
- The fifth floor of the museum consists of halls for the Buddha Images, dating back to the Pyu Period and up to the present day.

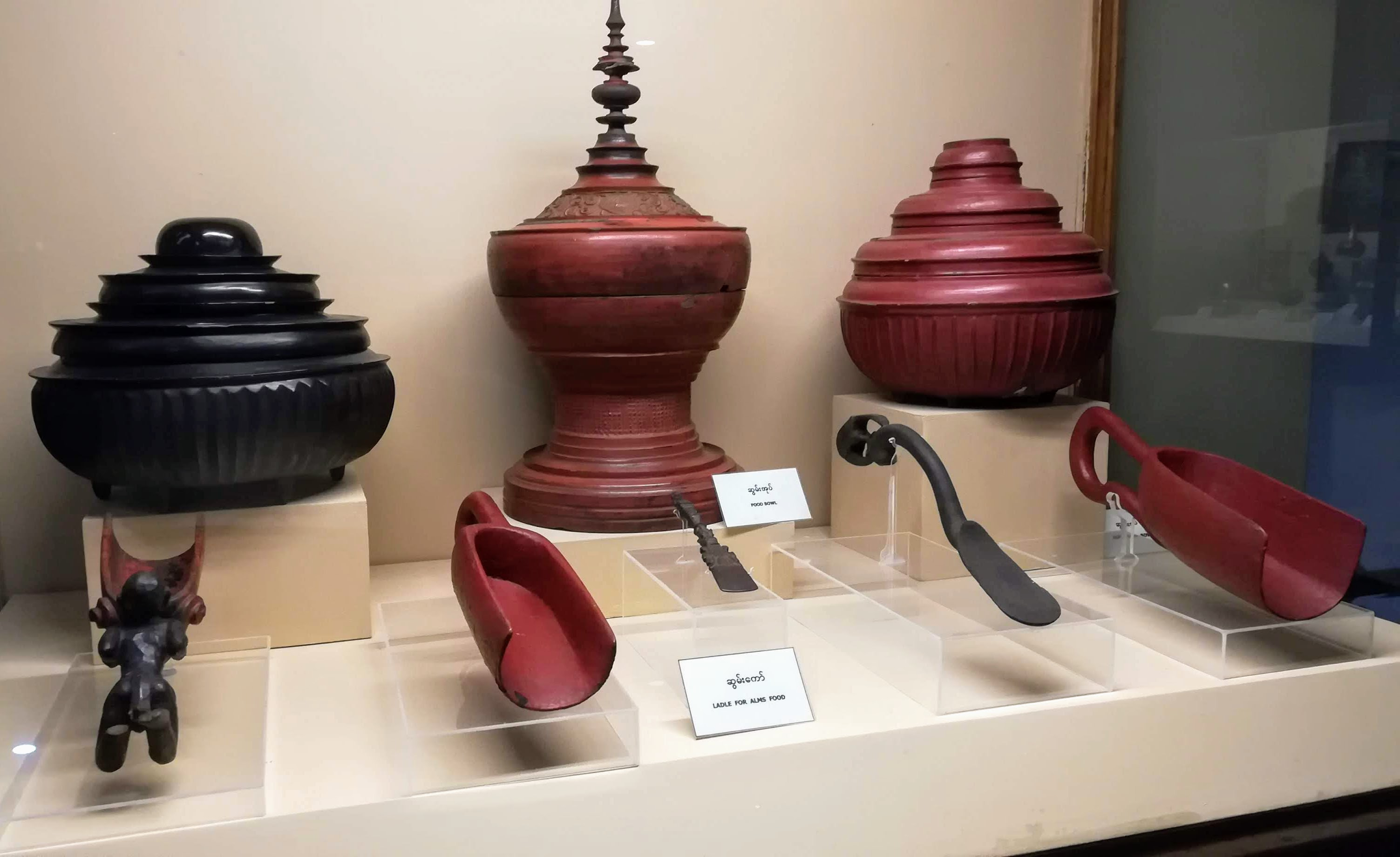
Items used for food for monks

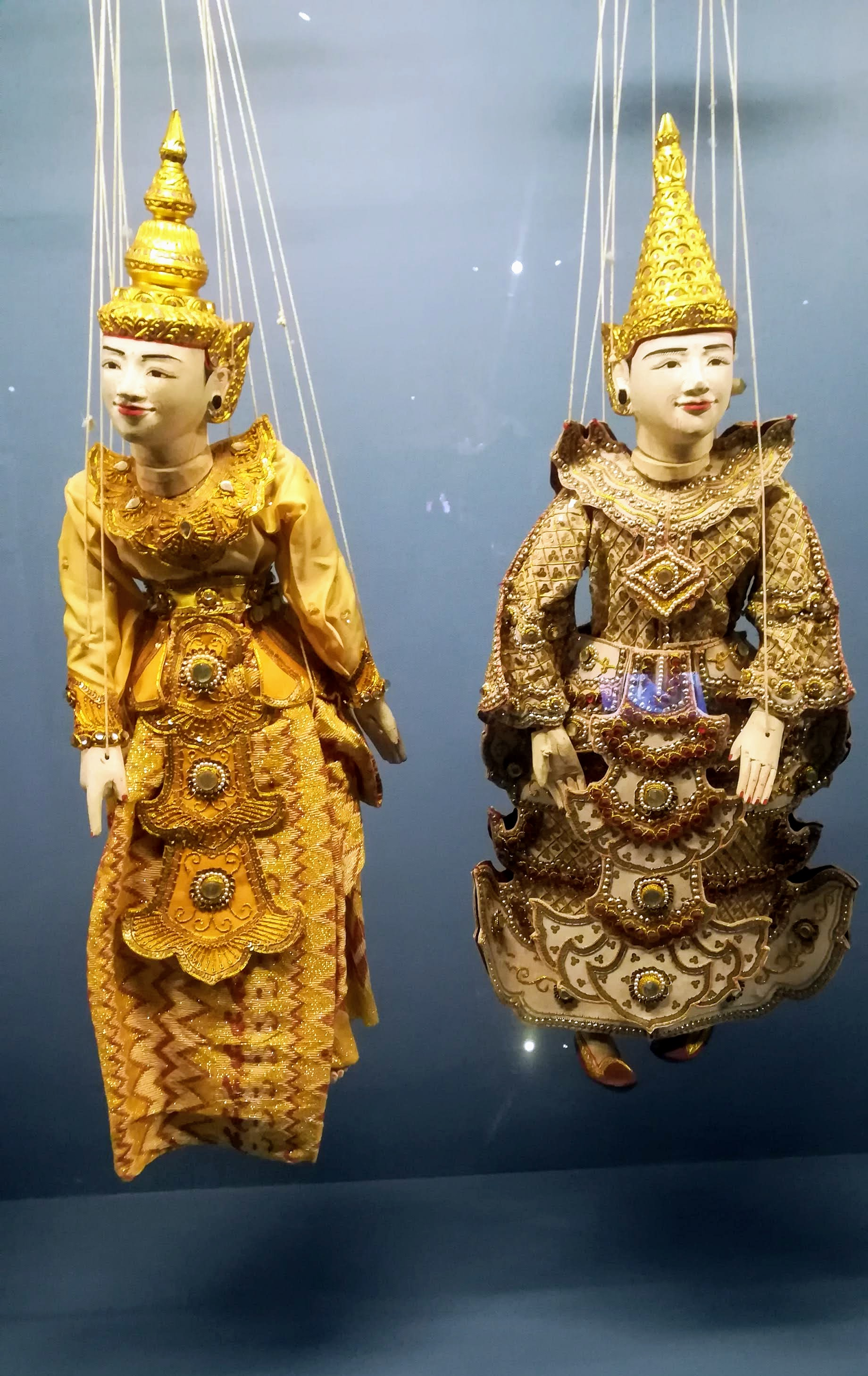
Burmese marionettes (Yoke thé)

=== Historic periods ===
- In the exhibition hall on Natural History, there are many fossils, dating back millions of years, including a 40-million-year-old anthropoid primate, found in the Pondaung region in Upper Myanmar.
- The hall of Pre-historic Times houses a replica of the Padah-Lin Caves, complete with its over 10,000-year-old Stone Age drawings, stone weapons of the Neolithic period, and bronze weapons of a later age. The hall also has exhibits on Pyu period (1st to 9th century), artifacts such as clay pots, urns, votive tablets and necklaces, as well as those found in archaeological excavations at the ancient Pyu city of Sri Ksetra.
- In the hall of Burmese History are exhibits on the pagodas, temples, monasteries and ordination halls of the Bagan Period and the marvelous murals of the Pinya, Inwa, Taungoo, and Konbaung periods. Rare ancient votive tablets with moldings from scenes of the jataka stories are also on display.
- The Royal Regalia hall houses displays of beautifully ornamented objects used in royal ceremonies of ancient kings from different periods, including 141 royal objects dating to the Konbaung dynasty after their return from the Indian Museum, Kolkata.
- The Throne Room houses miniature models of the eight kinds of thrones of ancient Burmese kings and the magnificent Royal Lion Throne of the last Burmese monarch King Thibaw in all its original majesty, used in Hluttaw Hall (or Hall of Council of Ministers).
- The Yadanabon Period Exhibit hall has displays on clothing fashions, furniture and other household articles, such as a palanquin used by King Thibaw's Chief Abbot.

== Organisational development and international cooperation ==
In 2015, the museums of Myanmar joined the International Council of Museums (ICOM) for wider international cooperation. In order to meet international standards of skills training and development for staff in museums to protect, safeguard and share the country's unique cultural heritage, the National Museum has also cooperated with the British Council Burma and the Collections Trust, a London-based charity. Among other activities, training courses were organized to gain the knowledge and skills necessary to increase the growth and sustainability of galleries and museums in Myanmar.

== See also ==
- List of museums in Myanmar
- National Museum of Myanmar (Naypyidaw)
- Mandalay Cultural Museum

== Literature ==
- Lenzi, Iola (2004). Museums of Southeast Asia. Singapore: Archipelago Press. pp. 200 pages. ISBN 981-4068-96-9.
