= Paw Thame =

Burmese-American painter

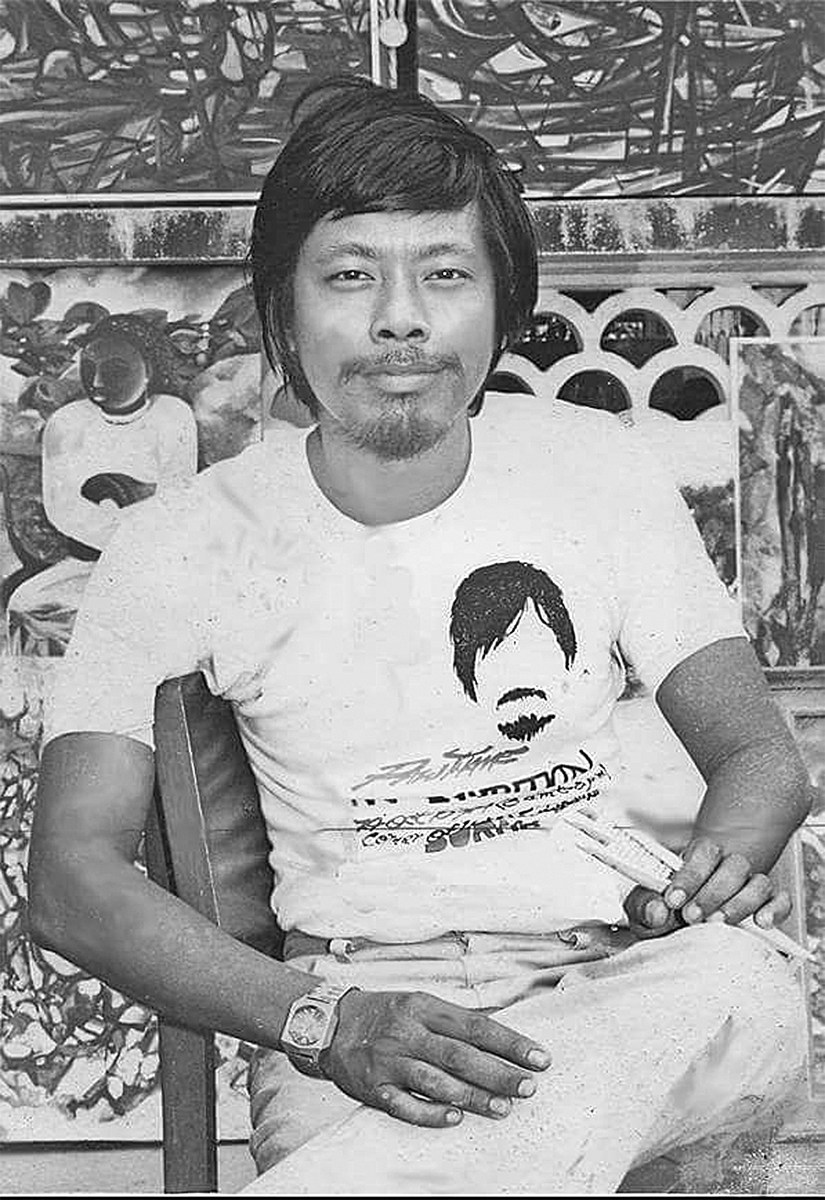
- Born: 1948, Shwebo, Burma
- Died: 2014
- Education: Mandalay University; informal study with Aung Khin and Kin Maung (Bank)
- Known for: Painting, founding of the Peacock Gallery, Rangoon; I Am Cadmium Red (memoir, 2010, Portrait of U Thant
- Movement: Burmese Modernism

Paw Thame (1948–2014) was a Burmese-American painter and one of the central figures of the modernist art movement in Burma during the 1970s and early 1980s. Born in Shwebo, he was largely self-taught, developing his practice through informal study with the pioneer modernists Aung Khin and Kin Maung (Bank), before moving to Rangoon, where he co-founded the Peacock Gallery in 1976 with sculptor Sonny Nyein — the first gallery in Burma devoted entirely to modern art. His circle included Win Pe, Kin Maung Yin, and Bagyi Aung Soe, artists now regarded as the founding generation of Burmese modernism.

Paw Thame emigrated to the United States in 1984, settling initially in Hawaii before moving to the mainland. His memoir I Am Cadmium Red (2010), edited by the Burmese writer Ma Thanegi, is regarded as an important primary document in the history of Burmese modernism.

== Early life ==
Paw Thame was born in 1948 in Shwebo, Burma. He graduated from Mandalay University. He subsequently attempted to enroll at the Mandalay School of Fine Arts, but the school was unable to accommodate his need for evening classes; the school's dean directed him to the studio of Aung Khin (1921–1996), one of the foundational figures of Burmese modernism.

== Education and Artistic Formation ==
Riding his bicycle to Aung Khin's studio, Paw Thame became a regular presence there — a habitué of the master's studio — where he was treated like a son. He absorbed the technical fundamentals of painting by observation, but was drawn not to Aung Khin's Impressionism — which he had already encountered through books — but to more radical modes. The two discussed art over tea, Aung Khin listening patiently to the younger man's restlessness and his dissatisfaction with the prevailing conventions of Burmese painting.

Win Pe (1936–) heard about Paw Thame and gave him support, materials, and access to his studio — the beginning of a lifelong friendship. Win Pe introduced Paw Thame to Kin Maung (Bank) (1910-1983), and the three met regularly at Kin Maung (Bank)'s or Win Pe's house to discuss modernist ideas and paint together. On graduating from Mandalay University, Paw Thame spent a summer working in Kin Maung (Bank)'s studio. He also became close with Bagyi Aung Soe (1924–1990) and Kin Maung Yin (1938-2014). These four — Kin Maung (Bank), Win Pe, Bagyi Aung Soe, and Kin Maung Yin— he called his 'backbones'.

== Peacock Gallery (1976-1984) ==
In 1976, Paw Thame and sculptor Sonny Nyein co-founded the Peacock Gallery in Rangoon — the first gallery in Burma devoted entirely to modern art. Conceived as a hybrid of garden and exhibition space that reflected Paw Thame's love of horticulture, the gallery brought together some of Rangoon's most experimental artists: Bagyi Aung Soe (1924–1990), Win Pe (1936–), Kin Maung Yin (1938–2014), and Sonny Nyein (1949–), among others. Presenting three to four shows annually, it was an immediate draw for collectors and the art community alike. The gallery's private shows operated with a freedom unavailable in official public venues, exempt from the ruling party's censorship rules. Their highly innovative private shows — paper cut-outs, batik, and rare plants — challenged conventional definitions of art in Rangoon at the time.

Other members of the gallery included Shwe Oung Thame, Ma Thanegi, Gyee Saw, Sein Myint and Nyi Nyi. Now recognized as the giants of Burmese modern art, Yangon society in the 1970s disparaged them — 'modern art' was literally translated as 'psychopathic art' or 'crazy art'. The gallery remained the only dedicated modern-art space in Burma until Paw Thame's emigration to the United States in 1984. Among the notable works associated with this period, Paw Thame was commissioned to paint a portrait of U Thant (1909–1974), the Burmese Secretary-General of the United Nations, in connection with U Thant's funeral in 1974/75.

In the historiography of Burmese modernism, Paw Thame is considered one of the leading figures of what Ma Thanegi has characterized as the third generation of Burmese modernists, building on the pioneering work of Kin Maung (Bank) and Bagyi Aung Soe (first generation) and Kin Maung Yin, Win Pe, and Paw Oo Thet (second generation).

== Artistic Style ==
During the 1960s, Paw Thame was drawn above all to the graphic quality he observed in the work of Win Pe and Kin Maung (Bank): solid colors, flat planes and clean lines. Into the 1970s, his paintings showed a consistent inclination toward the reduction of natural forms into geometric structures — an approach rooted in Cézanne's premise to 'treat nature by the cylinder, the sphere, the cone'. Certain works from the middle of the 1970s continue to display close stylistic affinities with the works of Win Pe, Kin Maung (Bank) and Paw Oo Thet. He was a master of both perpendicular and curved lines.

Paw Thame's works are varied, as he refused to limit himself in style or subject. Yin Ker describes his output as marked by great stylistic and thematic eclecticism. He viewed repetition of subject, palette, and composition as a betrayal of the artist's vocation. For Paw Thame, modernism was not a fixed style but a perpetual pursuit of new representational modes. His creativity and the boldness of his brushstrokes, composition and colors seen in his paintings set him apart from many others in his generation.

The New York Series and Washington DC Series, produced during visits to Win Pe in New York City (c.1995) and Washington DC (c.1998) respectively, are considered among his most significant bodies of work.

== Life in the United States (1984-2014) ==
=== Hawaii (1984–c.1990) ===
Paw Thame emigrated to Hawaii in 1984, where he worked as a full-time artist for several years and exhibited his work. In 1986, he curated a group show in Hawaii featuring works by Bagyi Aung Soe, Sonny Nyein, and Kin Maung Yin. He subsequently organized exhibitions in Seoul in 1988 and 1990.

=== Later years (c.1990–2014) ===
Paw Thame later moved to Atlanta, Georgia, and subsequently to Texas, where he lived until his death in 2014. His memoir I Am Cadmium Red (2010), based on email exchanges with a patron friend in late 2008 and early 2009, gives an account of his life and artistic outlook during these years. In the later period of his career he exhibited in Yangon, and in October 2012 he showed 42 paintings at Gallery 65 in Yangon in a joint exhibition with sculptor Sonny Nyein.

== I Am Cadmium Red ==
I Am Cadmium Red (2010) is Paw Thame's memoir, based on email exchanges with Chris Dodge, a patron friend and art dealer, in late 2008 and early 2009, subsequently edited into book form by the Burmese writer Ma Thanegi. Written in the first person, it offers the artist's perspectives on his life, his friendships, and his understanding of modernism in the context of Burmese art.

Yin Ker has described the work as an exceptional document of candor in a milieu where such directness is rare, comparing its function to that of Giorgio Vasari's Lives of the Artists as a primary record of an artistic generation, and regards it as an indispensable contribution to the history of Burmese modernism.

== Legacy ==
Paw Thame is now recognized, alongside Win Pe, Kin Maung Yin, and Bagyi Aung Soe, as one of the central figures of Burmese modernism. In 2016, the Burmese art writer Hlaing Bwa published a monograph on his life and work in Burmese, which has been influential among collectors and scholars of Burmese modern art in Myanmar.
