= Shwe Oung Thame =

Burmese painter (1932–1994)

Shwe Oung Thame (born Aung Thein; 1932–1994) was a Burmese painter with a high reputation among modernists in Burma. Although older than Win Pe and Paw Oo Thet, he did not arrive on the modernist scene until a few years after them. Later he would join Paw Thame and the group at Peacock Gallery in their modernist experimentations. He was born Aung Thein but later changed the spelling of his name in English and added the prefix Shwe, meaning gold, signing his paintings Shwe Oung Thame.

== Life / Early Training ==
Shwe Oung Thame was born in Yangon and was introduced to painting at a young age. He studied under the well-known master, Ba Thet. Beginning in 1961, he showed more than 300 paintings at Sarpaybeikman Exhibitions.

== Work ==
Shwe Oung Thame was an important artist in the middle period in the development of modernist art in Burma. He was an outsider with a witty, grouchy personality. This rebelliousness—common among the modernists at Peacock Gallery—was probably a requirement at a time when modern art was literally translated as "crazy art". Later he would be considered a master in his own right with students who are leading modernists in Burma today, including Win Pe Myint, Tin Maung Oo and Bogie.

Paw Thame collected his work, bringing this collection to the United States and organizing an exhibition in 1986 in Hawaii along with the art of Bagyi Aung Soe, Sonny Nyein and Kin Maung Yin. Later, two more exhibitions were added in Seoul in 1988 and 1990.

Shwe Oung Thame's work is rare. When Andrew Ranard found some excellent examples, he writes, "I am came to understand how he painted. He let everything go. He painted as watercolor is painted. It came out right or it didn't come out right. He didn't correct." Like Lun Gywe, he found his metier in bold fluid strokes—not self-conscious dabbing. "These are rapidly produced paintings in which he seems to mix some of the lightning techniques of Chinese ink and watercolor method with oil painting… it might be called "action impressionism".

He is most known for his richly textured landscapes in oil, painted with a knife in strong colors, many on smaller canvases. Among his most famous subjects are those of the Burmese city Mogok with Mogok lake in the foreground and surrounded by its mountains.

Shwe Oung Thame also wrote two books on his life and aesthetics, The Fool and Going Out of the Golden Cave. His first, A Yoo (Fool) is a satirical and fictionalized record of his life as an artist at odds with "normal people". The book was controversial, causing a huge stir in the conservative literary and artistic world. It quickly became a bestseller.

== Publications ==
- A Yoo = the fool
- Going Out of the Golden Cave
