= Thame (disambiguation) =

Thame is a market town and civil parish in Oxfordshire, England

Thame may also refer to:

- Thame, Nepal, small Sherpa villages in Namche VDC of the Solukhumbu District in Nepal
- River Thame, river in Southern England
- Thame United F.C., football club based in Thame, Oxfordshire, England
- Viscount Bertie of Thame, title of the County of Oxford, in the Peerage of the United Kingdom

== People ==
- Mendes Thame (1946 –2022), Brazilian politician
- Paw Thame (1948–2014), Burmese-American painter
- Rachel de Thame, English gardener, television presenter and actress
- Shwe Oung Thame (1932–1994), Burmese painter with a high reputation among modernists in Burma

== See also ==
- Tame (disambiguation)
- Thames (disambiguation)
