= Saw Than Htut =

Burmese politician

Member of the Amyotha Hluttaw
- Incumbent
- Assumed office 3 February 2016
- Constituency: Kayin State № 2
- Majority: 38184 votes

Personal details
- Born: 2 March 1958 (age 68) Yangon, Myanmar
- Party: National League for Democracy
- Spouse: Ohmar Min Kyi
- Parent(s): Saw Hla Tun (father); Ah Mar (mother)
- Education: B.ECom (Eco), H.G.P
- Alma mater: Yangon Institute of Economics

Saw Than Htut (Burmese: စောသန်းထွဋ်; born 2 March 1958) is a Burmese politician who currently serves as an Amyotha Hluttaw MP for Kayin State No. 2 Constituency. He is a member of the National League for Democracy.

== Early life and education ==
Saw was born on 2 March 1958 in Yangon, Myanmar. He is an ethnic Karen. He graduated with B.ECom (Eco) from Yangon Institute of Economics.

== Political career ==
He is a member of the National League for Democracy. In the 2015 Myanmar general election, he was elected as an Amyotha Hluttaw MP, winning a majority of 38184 votes and elected representative from Kayin State No. 2, parliamentary constituency. And then, he serves as the chairman of Amyotha Hluttaw Public Accounts Committee.
