= Win Pe Myint =

Burmese painter

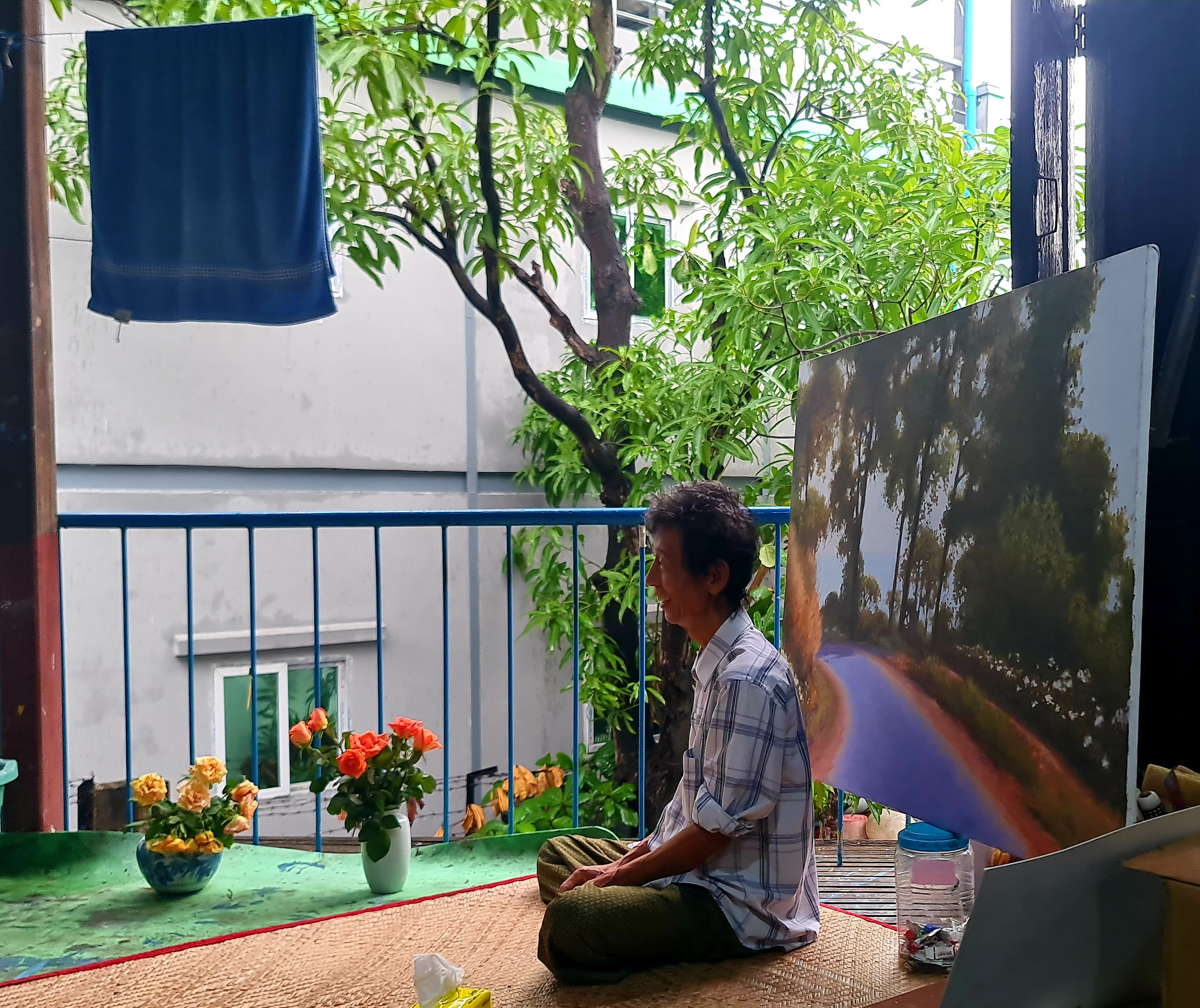
- Win Pe Myint in Yangon, 2023
- Born: June 23, 1948; Minbu Township, Magway Region, Burma (Myanmar)
- Education: Rangoon Arts and Science University (BA, 1970); studied painting under Lun Gywe, Paw Oo Thet, and Min Wae Aung
- Known for: Painting
- Movement: Modernist painting in Burma

Win Pe Myint, WPM (Burmese: ဝင်းဖေမြင့်, pronounced [wɪ́ɰ̃ pʰè mjɪ̰ɰ̃]; born 1948) is a noted Burmese painter. In 1970, he graduated from Rangoon Arts and Sciences University with a Botany major. He was extremely interested in painting since childhood. He studied under 4 outstanding art masters: Lun Gywe, Shwe Oung Thame, Paw Oo Thet and Thein Han (painter). He worked as an art teacher in Regional College - 3 from 1984 to 1986. He should not be confused with the earlier Burmese painter Win Pe of Mandalay, born in 1936, who was a contemporary of Paw Oo Thet, and one of the early founders of modernist painting in Burma.

Win Pe Myint is known for his still lifes; he also paints landscapes and portraits. In February 2005 he opened his studio (True Colour) in Hlaingthaya Township, designed by architect Aung Soe Myint.

== See also ==
- Paw Oo Thet
- Thein Han (painter)
