= Set Aung =

Dr. Set Aung
- ဒေါက်တာဆက်အောင်
- Minister: Kyaw Win

Deputy Minister for Finance and Planning
- Incumbent
- Assumed office 31 July 2017

Deputy Governor of the Central Bank of Myanmar
- In office 31 July 2013 – 31 July 2017

Deputy Minister for National Planning and Economic Development
- In office June 2012 – July 2013

Economic Advisor to the President of Myanmar
- In office April 2011 – June 2012

Personal details
- Born: Myanmar
- Citizenship: Myanmar
- Parent: Set Maung
- Education: Cass Business School; University of Stirling; Yangon Institute of Economics; University of Yangon; Keio University
- Occupation: Economist
- Profession: Economist

Set Aung (Burmese: ဒေါက်တာဆက်အောင်) who is also known as Winston Set Aung is former Deputy Minister of the Ministry of Planning, Finance and Industry. He also had multiple roles as Chairperson of Thilawa Special Economic Zone's Management Committee of Myanmar, member of National Economic Coordination Committee (NECC) and Secretary of the Development Assistance Coordination Unit (DACU) that were chaired by the State Counsellor Aung San Su Kyi, until the Myanmar military launched the coup on 1 February 2021. Additionally, he was also Secretary of Anti-Money Laundering and Countering the Financing of Terrorism Steering Committee chaired by the Vice President of Myanmar, Chairperson of the Kyaukphyu Special Economic Zone, Chairperson of the Myanmar National Airlines and member of the Myanmar Investment Commission (MIC).

When the coup d'état occurred in February 2021, the military junta unjustly prosecuted Winston Set Aung alongside State Counsellor Aung San Suu Kyi, Union Minister Soe Win, and Economic Advisor Dr. Sean Turnell. In Dr. Turnell's case, an Australian professor, the junta accused him of violating the Official Secrets Act by allegedly manipulating and planting official documents on his laptop. Since Turnell was officially appointed by the Ministry of Planning, Finance, and Industry, the junta also prosecuted Soe Win and Winston Set Aung, who held positions as Minister and Deputy Minister in that ministry, accusing them of being responsible for Turnell's actions. Additionally, the junta charged State Counsellor Aung San Suu Kyi with the same offense, claiming that she should also be held accountable for the actions of her minister and deputy minister.

As a result, the junta orchestrated sham and farcical legal proceedings, sentencing all of them to three years in prison. Alongside them, the junta unfairly prosecuted and imprisoned numerous other Cabinet members of the democratically elected civilian government, politicians, and student activists under various charges. Dr. Turnell was released and deported in late 2022. Winston Set Aung was released in 2023 after completing his prison term. However, the former de facto Head of State, Aung San Suu Kyi, remains in prison facing many other spurious legal charges.

Before he held the aforementioned positions, he served as Deputy Governor of the Central Bank of Myanmar until July 2017, Deputy Minister for National Planning and Economic Development from June 2012 to July 2013 and Economics Advisor to President Thein Sein from April 2011 to June 2012. He previously served as Director of Myanmar Development Resource Institute from September 2011 to May 2012 and Secretary of National Economic and Social Advisory Council of Myanmar from January 2011 to April 2012.

Before his involvement in the public sector working for the government of Myanmar, he was involved in the private sector as a Founder and Director of Asia Development Research Co., Ltd., and Asia Language and Business Academy Co., Ltd. He also worked for several multinational organizations in the financial, oil and gas sectors including Lazard, Deutsche, Peregrine, and Shell.

== Early life and education ==
Set Aung earned a BSc degree in Industrial Chemistry from University of Yangon in 1995, an MBA in General Business Administration and Management from Yangon Institute of Economics in 1997, MSc in Banking and Finance from Stirling Management School, University of Stirling, UK in 1998, and an MSc in Investment Management from City University Business School (the name of which was changed later to Bayes Business School), City University London in 2001. He also holds a PhD degree in Media and Governance from the Keio University, Japan, in 2016.

He has been involved in international and regional research projects related to economics, social and policy development in various countries, and has completed over 40 international and regional economic and social research projects in more than 10 countries.

== Publications ==
Set Aung has authored research papers in cooperation with international and regional academic and policy institutes, including the University of Tokyo, Japan, the Institute for Security and Development Policy in Stockholm, Sweden, Chulalongkorn University in Bangkok, Thailand, Mekong Institute in Khon Kaen, Thailand, Stockholm Environmental Institute (SEI-Asia), and the Research Institute on Contemporary Southeast Asia of France, Paris.

== Personal life ==
Set Aung's father, Set Maung, was formerly a deputy minister during the Burma Socialist Programme Party era.
