= Thames (disambiguation) =

The Thames is a river in southern England, including the capital, London.

Thames may also refer to:

== Places ==
=== United Kingdom ===
- Thames (Barking and Dagenham ward), a local government ward in London
- Thames (Reading ward), a local government ward in the Borough of Reading

=== New Zealand ===
- Thames (New Zealand electorate)
- Thames, New Zealand, a town
  - Thames High School
- Thames River (New Zealand), former name of the Waihou River

=== Other places ===
- Thames River (Connecticut), southeastern Connecticut
- Thames River (Ontario), Ontario, Canada
- Thames Street, Rhode Island, Newport, Rhode Island
- Thames Town, in Shanghai, China

== Transportation ==
- HMS Thames, several warships of the Royal Navy
- HMT Thames (1938), a rescue tugboat in the British Royal Navy
- PS Thames, a steamship launched in 1868
- The Thames (steamship), British exploration ship lost in Siberia
- Thames (1818 ship), an 1818 East Indiaman under a license from the British East India Company
- Thames Trader, former British Ford lorry model brand name
- Thames, a GWR 3031 Class locomotive built for and run on the Great Western Railway between 1891 and 1915, renamed the Worcester in 1895
- Thames-class lifeboat, class of lifeboat operated by the Royal National Lifeboat Institution (RNLI) between 1974 and 1997

== People ==
- Eric Thames (born 1986), American baseball player
- Marcus Thames (born 1977), American baseball player
- Mason Thames (born 2007), American child actor
- José Ignacio Thames (1762–1832), Argentine statesman and priest

== Other uses ==
- Battle of the Thames, part of the War of 1812
- Thames A.F.C., former London football club
- Thames (production company), former British television production company
- Thames Rowing Club, rowing club using the River Thames in Putney, London
- Thames Television, former TV broadcaster and production company

== See also ==
- Thame (disambiguation)
