= Aung Tun Thet =

Burmese economist

- အောင်ထွန်းသက်
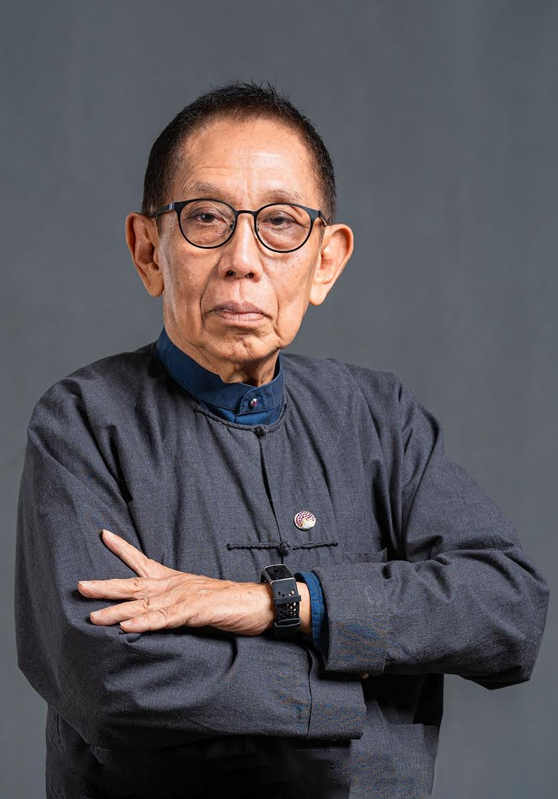

Personal details
- Born: 18 February 1945 (age 81) Bago
- Spouse: Swe Swe Thein
- Children: 1
- Parent(s): Colonel Pe Thet (father); Daw Tin Nyut (mother)
- Education: University of Yangon; University of Warwick; University of Manchester; University of Marburg

Aung Tun Thet (Burmese: အောင်ထွန်းသက်) is a Burmese economist, author, educator, and public speaker. He had worked in academia, government service, private sector and in the civil society. He has published over 30 books and writes regularly in the local press.

Aung Tun Thet has a Bachelor of Commerce degree from Rangoon University, a Master of Science in operations research from the University of Warwick, and a Ph.D. in management sciences from the University of Manchester. He is also a post-doctoral fellow at the University of Marburg.

He is an advisor to the Republic of the Union of Myanmar Federation of Chambers of Commerce and Industry. He is also chairman of the UN Global Compact Network Myanmar and the National Contact Person of the Organisation for Economic Co-operation and Development (OECD) Responsible Business Conduct.

He holds academic positions at the University of British Columbia, Yunnan University Institute of Myanmar Studies, Payap University, University of Yangon, Yangon University of Economics, and Myanmar Imperial University teach at post-graduate courses. He is a well known public speaker delivering motivational talks to the general public. He published many books in English and Myanmar and is a regular columnist in the public media.

== Career ==
=== 1966-1977 ===
After graduating from Yangon University of Economics in 1965, Aung Tun Thet joined the Department of Commerce and Administrative Studies at the Institute as a faculty member in 1966. In 1971, he was awarded the Colombo Plan State Scholarship and went to the United Kingdom for graduate studies. He obtained the postgraduate diploma in management studies from Brighton Polytechnic with credit and distinctions in 1972. In 1973, he gained the Master of Science degree in operations research from University of Warwick. He then undertook doctoral research and in 1977, was awarded the Ph.D. degree from University of Manchester Institute of Science and Technology in management sciences.

=== 1977-1989 ===
Aung Tun Thet continued to serve at the Department of Commerce and Administrative Studies, undertaking teaching, research and publications. He supervised post-graduate students and undertook research in the fields of Cooperatives, Health Economics, Health Systems Research, and Social Issues. He taught the students enrolled at the Post-graduate Diploma in Management and Administration Programme. He served as the consultant at the Ministry of Health and at World Health Organization South East Asian Regional Office in New Delhi, India. He also taught at the postgraduate diploma in tropical medicine. At the University of Medicine, he taught operations research. He read many research papers at the annual Research Congresses as well at Burma Medical Association Conferences. He also served as the advisor at the Ministry of Cooperatives and was instrumental for setting up the Central Cooperatives Training Institute. He was appointed as the Central Executive Committee of Central Cooperative Society, and read research papers at their annual conferences.

In 1986, he was awarded the Alexander von-Humboldt Post-Doctoral Research Fellowship, and spent three years in West Germany undertaking research at the Phillips University of Marburg. The results of his research culminated in a book entitled “Burmese Entrepreneurship: Creative Response in the Colonial Economy”, published by the University of Heidelberg. He also served as a consultant at WHO Headquarters in Geneva, Switzerland.

In 1989, Aung Tun Thet was appointed the director-general of the newly established Department of Planning and Statistics, at the Ministry of Health. Concurrently, he was appointed the secretary of National Health Committee, a supra ministerial body headed by de facto prime minister. He also served as vice-president of Myanmar Children and Women Welfare Association. He initiated the accession of Myanmar to the Convention on the Rights of the Child (CRC). He introduced the family planning programme for the first time in the country and also introduced the comprehensive cost-sharing programme for essential drugs. He participated at the Regional Health Ministers’ meetings. He continues to teach at the Institute of Economics and Institute of Medicine. He also taught at the reorientation programmes for officials from Ministry of Education and Ministry of Health.

=== 1992-2000 ===
In 1992, he was appointed the chief of Costs and Economics Unit at UNICEF, Headquarters in New York. Later, he served as the senior policy advisor at Office of Social Policy. From 1997 to 2000, he served as the senior programme and planning officer for UNICEF, Country Office in Dhaka, Bangladesh. He then moved to Bangkok, Thailand as the Regional Planning and Policy Advisor at UNICEF Regional Office.

Shortly after, he was appointed the principal officer at the newly-opened UN Systems Staff College at Turin, Italy. He was in charge of the UN Country Team training and this capacity visited Asia, Europe, Middle East, Latin American and African countries. He was also a member of the UN Evaluation Offices Committee, and was involved with the promotion of the One-UN Initiative. He supervised the work on the United Nations Global Compact.

=== 2008-2015 ===
He retired from UN service in 2008 and returned to Myanmar. He was appointed as a consultant at UNICEF Country Office, Myanmar. He was involved with the post-Nargis response supporting the Tri-partite Core Group activities in capacity building. Later in 2009, he was appointed as Senior Advisor to the UN Resident Coordinator Office in Yangon, where he supported the coordination activities. He also taught at the master's courses at Yangon University of Economics, Yangon University and National Defence College. He taught at the department of international relations at Yangon University and was the external examiner for six Ph.D. candidates.

In 2010, he was appointed as a Member of Legal and Special Affairs Commission at the Union-Level Parliament. Later he become President’s economic advisor as well the vice-chairman of National Economic and Social Advisory Council. He was also appointed as the Member of the Myanmar Investment Commission. He worked on the administrative reform process and help established the Myanmar Development Institute. He formed the UN Global Compact Network Myanmar, and UN Secretary-General Mr. Ban Ki-Moon inaugurated the launch of the Initiative in Myanmar. He also served as the Advisor at Union of Myanmar Federation of Chamber of Commerce and Industry. He was awarded the Doctor of Letters (honoris causa) by the Yangon University of Commerce and also was appointed as the honorary professor at the University of British Columbia, Vancouver, Canada. He became a member of the UNESCO-India Mahatma Gandhi Institute for Peace, New Delhi India. He gave public seminars on economics, management and social sciences. He also served as the member of the Myanmar Press Council.

=== 2015–present ===
In 2016, he was appointed as a member of Peace Commission, and later as a Member of the Myanmar Investment Commission (MIC). At the Peace Commission. he was responsible for launching the Business for Peace (B4P) Initiative. In 2016, he served as a member of the Maungdaw Investigation Commission which was formed to examine the incidents in Rakhine after the ARSA attacks October and November. He represented Myanmar at the Myanmar Update 2017 Conference held at National University at Canberra, Australia. In 2017, he was appointed as the Chief Coordinator of Union Enterprise for Humanitarian, Resettlement and Development (UEHRD) in Rakhine State and concurrently as Member of UEHRD Committee. In 2018, he was appointed as a member of the Independent Commission of Enquiry, looking into the aftermath of the incidents that occurred in August 2017.

He was also appointed as the Visiting Professor at Payap University, Chiangmai, Thailand. He continues to serve as the Advisor at Union of Myanmar Federation of Chambers of Commerce and Industry. He is teaching post-graduate students undertaking MPA, MBA, MBF and MDevS courses at Yangon University of Economics as well at Yangon University.He continues to give public seminars and also teaches at Strategy First University and Myanmar Imperial University. In 2019, he was invited to attend the Distinguished Guest Programme organized by Korean Foundation. He was appointed as the Academic Advisory Board Member of Institute of Myanmar Studies at Yunnan University, China in 2019. He is also serving as Senior Advisor to the Executive Director of Korea Research Institute, University of New South Wales, Melbourne, Australia. In June 2020, Prof. Thet was awarded the Distinguished Teacher award by Ministry of Education.

Aung Tun Thet has continued conducting online and virtual learning seminars on management, leadership, and sustainable development, with foreign and local universities.

== Personal life ==
Aung Tun Thet was born in Bago, Myanmar on February 18, 1945. He is the eldest son of Colonel Pe Thet and Daw Tin Nyut.

Aung Tun Thet is married to Daw Swe Swe Thein. They have one daughter Thet-Htar Thet. Their daughter is now attending Columbia University School of Public and International Affairs, majoring in Development Practice.

== Education ==
- University of Yangon, B.Com, 1965
- University of Brighton, Postgraduate diploma in management studies, 1972
- University of Warwick, M.Sc. operations research, 1973
- University of Manchester, Ph.D. in management sciences, 1977
- University of Marburg, Postdoctoral research fellow, 1986-1988
- Yangon University of Economics, D.Litt., 2014
