= U Myint =

Burmese economist (born 1938)

- ဦးမြင့်
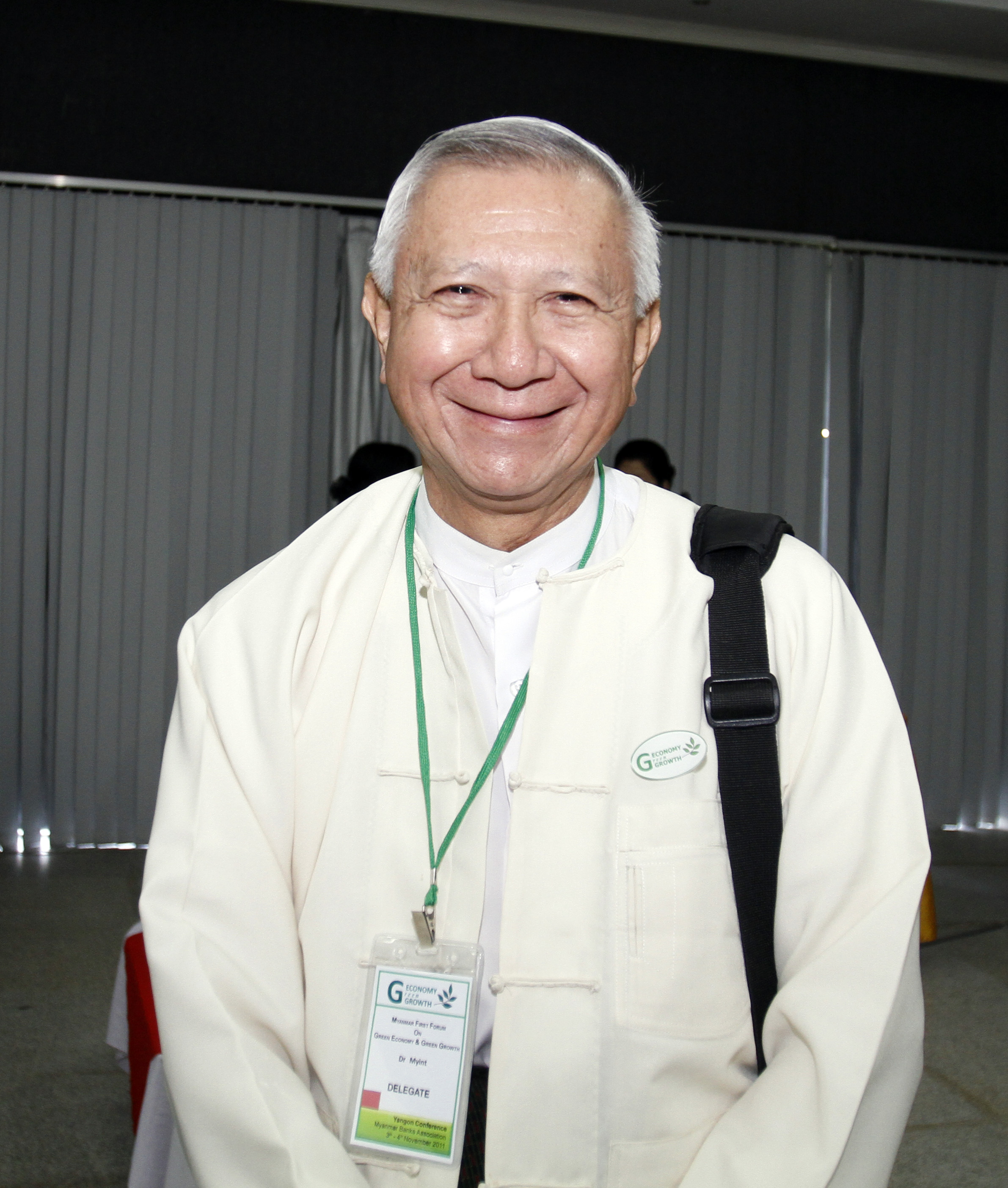

Chief Economic Advisor of the President's Office of Myanmar
- Incumbent
- Assumed office 19 April 2011 Serving with Tin Hla Bo and Aung Tun Thet
- Preceded by: Office established

Personal details
- Born: 1938 (age 87–88)
- Relations: U Aye (ambassador) (Brother)
- Education: Rangoon University (B.A.); Cornell University (M.A.); University of California, Berkeley (Ph.D)
- Occupation: Economist

U Myint (Burmese: ဦးမြင့်) is a Burmese economist and served as the Chief Presidential Adviser to Thein Sein, the former President of Burma, and led his Economic Advisory Unit.

== Career ==
U Myint comes from a well-connected and prominent family. He attended Rangoon University where he received a multiple Bachelor degrees in English, politics, and economics, before moving onto Cornell University, where he earned a master's degree in economics. He then earned a Ph.D in economics at the University of California, Berkeley.

U Myint was previously a professor of economics at Rangoon University's Institute of Economics, and also served as the director of Ministry of Foreign Affairs' economics department. He later led the Research Department at the United Nations Economic and Social Commission for Asia and the Pacific. U Myint currently presides as the director of the Yangon-based Tun Foundation Bank.

In 2011, his appointment as President Thein Sein's chief economic adviser surprised many Burma watchers, as he has a close relationship with Aung San Suu Kyi.

In May 2011, U Myint proposed the creation of an independent research center, the Myanmar Development Resource Institute (MDRI), in a paper entitled "Reducing Poverty in Myanmar: The Way Forward", to combat poverty. The institute was then founded by U Myint and other advisors to President Thein Sein. He currently heads the MDRI's Centre for Economic and Social Development.

== Papers for Myanmar reforms ==
U Myint become notable after he published his paper in 2011 (after new government President U Thein Sein took office); Reducing Poverty in Myanmar, Kyat valuation paper, Anti-corruption paper, FDI Paper, and more. In 2012, U Myint wrote an open letter to the public which he sought to inspire action regarding the restoration of the University of Yangon "to its Former Glory," which was one of the top universities in Asia.

== See also ==
- 2011–2015 Myanmar political reforms
