= List of shipwrecks in July 1877 =

The list of shipwrecks in July 1877 includes ships sunk, foundered, grounded, or otherwise lost during July 1877.

== 1 July ==
List of shipwrecks: 1 July 1877
| Ship | State | Description |
|---|---|---|
| Ann Maria | United States | The fishing schooner was wrecked on the Newburyport, Massachusetts bar. Her crew were rescued. |
| Salier | Germany | The steamship ran aground on the Chico Bank, in the River Plate. She was on a voyage from Bremen to Buenos Aires, Argentina. She was later refloated. |
| Wastdale | United Kingdom | The steamship ran aground at Öregrund, Sweden. She was refloated. |
| No. 1 | United Kingdom | The powder hulk was destroyed by an explosion at Gravesend, Kent with the loss of three lives. |

== 2 July ==
List of shipwrecks: 2 July 1877
| Ship | State | Description |
|---|---|---|
| Governor Morton | United States | The medium clipper was struck by lightning in the Mississippi River and caught fire. She was scuttled but burned to the water's edge. Subsequently refloated and towed to New Orleans, Louisiana, where sold to defray salvage costs. |
| Helena | United Kingdom | The yacht sank at Carrickfergus, County Antrim with the loss of at least one life. |
| Metropolitan | United Kingdom | The steamship collided with the steamship Demetrius (United Kingdom) and sank in the River Thames at Greenhithe, Kent. Metropolitan was on a voyage from IJmuiden, North Holland, Netherlands to London. |
| Sandusky | United States | The ship ran aground in the Cattewater. She was on a voyage from Pensacola, Florida to Plymouth, Devon, United Kingdom. She was refloated. |
| William | United Kingdom | The ship ran aground at Falmouth, Cornwall. She was on a voyage from Falmouth to Malpas, Cornwall. |

== 3 July ==
List of shipwrecks: 3 July 1877
| Ship | State | Description |
|---|---|---|
| E. L. Margaret | United Kingdom | The ship ran aground on the Brake Sand. She was refloated. |
| Lina | United Kingdom | The ship sprang a leak and sank off Dagerort, Russia with the loss of seven of her eleven crew. She was on a voyage from Hull, Yorkshire to Kronstadt, Russia. |
| Orisni | United Kingdom | The ship was damaged by fire at Cardiff, Glamorgan. |
| Reine Blanche | French Navy | The Alma-class ironclad collided with Thétis (French Navy) and was beached in the Îles d'Hyères, Var. |
| The Thames | United Kingdom | The steamship ran aground on the Yenisei River in Russia and became a constructive total loss. |

== 4 July ==
List of shipwrecks: 4 July 1877
| Ship | State | Description |
|---|---|---|
| Matin | United Kingdom | The steamship ran aground at Sunderland, County Durham. She was on a voyage from Sunderland to Dundee, Forfarshire. She was refloated. |
| Venezia | Italy | The barque was driven ashore and wrecked at Alexandria, Egypt. She was on a voyage from Newport, Monmouthshire, United Kingdom to Alexandria. |

== 5 July ==
List of shipwrecks: 5 July 1877
| Ship | State | Description |
|---|---|---|
| Cashmere | United Kingdom | The steamship was wrecked at Cape Guardafui, Majeerteen Sultanate with the loss of seven of the 93 people on board. She was on a voyage from Nossa Be, Madagascar to Aden, Aden Colony. |
| Elphinstone, and Redewater | United Kingdom | The steamships collided in the Saint Lawrence River 10 nautical miles (19 km) downstream of Montreal, Quebec. Elphistone sank and Redewater was beached. All on board both vessels were rescued. |
| Giacomo Giulio | Italy | The barque spang a leak and foundered in the Mediterranean Sea. Her crew were rescued by the steamship Mediterraneo (Italy). Giacomo Giulio was on a voyage from Rio, Elba to Newport, Monmouthshire, United Kingdom. Name also reported as Giæinto. |
| Severen | Sweden | The ship ran aground at Öregrund. She was on a voyage from Stockholm to "Harnas". She was refloated and resumed her voyage. |
| South Tyne | United Kingdom | The steamship was driven ashore at New York, United States. She was on a voyage from a Mediterranean port to New York. She was refloated and taken in to New York. |
| Sylphe | French Navy | The aviso ran aground at Brest, Finistère. |

== 7 July ==
List of shipwrecks: 7 July 1877
| Ship | State | Description |
|---|---|---|
| Ellen Lamb, and Zealandia | United Kingdom | The barque Ellen Lamb collided with Zealandia and sank off Rio de Janeiro, Brazil with the loss of five of her sixteen crew. She was on a voyage from Liverpool, Lancashire to Callao, Peru. Zealandia was on a voyage from London to Wellington, New Zealand. She was severely damaged and put in to Rio de Janeiro sinking at the bow. |
| Gaulois | France | The ship foundered in the Mediterranean Sea off Cape Roux. She was on a voyage Corsica to Marseille, Bouches-du-Rhône. |
| Nef | Norway | The brigantine was abandoned at sea. Her crew were rescued by Reciprocity (United Kingdom). Nef was on a voyage from Agrigento, Sicily, Kingdom of Italy to Söderhamn, Sweden. |
| Sancta Maria | Denmark | The schooner ran aground on the Haisborough Sands, in the North Sea off the coast of Norfolk, United Kingdom. She was on a voyage from Aalborg to Exeter, Devon, United Kingdom. She was later refloated and resumed her voyage, but put in to Dover, Kent, United Kingdom in a leaky condition on 27 July. |

== 9 July ==
List of shipwrecks: 9 July 1877
| Ship | State | Description |
|---|---|---|
| City of Waterford | United Kingdom | The steamship was wrecked in the White Sea. She was on a voyage from Arkhangelsk, Russia to London. |

== 10 July ==
List of shipwrecks: 10 July 1877
| Ship | State | Description |
|---|---|---|
| Maria Giuseppe | Italy | The barque foundered at Buenos Aires, Argentina. |
| Rowland | United Kingdom | The steamship ran aground in the Saint Lawrence River 10 nautical miles (19 km) downstream of Montreal, Quebec, Canada. She was on a voyage from Newport, Monmouthshire to Montreal. She was refloated. |

== 11 July ==
List of shipwrecks: 11 July 1877
| Ship | State | Description |
|---|---|---|
| Eaglet | United Kingdom | The ship departed from Nagasaki, Japan for Shanghai, China. No further trace, reported missing. |

== 12 July ==
List of shipwrecks: 12 July 1877
| Ship | State | Description |
|---|---|---|
| Christian McAusland | United Kingdom | The ship ran aground and sank at Nicholas Point, in the Thousand Islands, Netherlands East Indies. Her crew were rescued. She was on a voyage from Manila, Spanish East Indies to Glasgow, Renfrewshire. |
| Estella de Camihoa | Portugal | The schooner foundered. Her crew were rescued. She was on a voyage from Lisbon to Faial Island, Azores. |
| Fernwood | United Kingdom | The steamship ran aground on the Fahludd Reef, in the Baltic Sea. She was on a voyage from Kronstadt, Russia to London. She was refloated on 15 July. |
| Henry Crossley | United Kingdom | The steamship was driven ashore at "Ossly", Öland, Sweden. She was on a voyage from Riga, Russia to London. She was refloated and resumed her voyage. |
| Quango | United States | The brig was wrecked at Nantucket, Massachusetts. Her crew were rescued. She was on a voyage from Azua, Dominican Republic to Boston, Massachusetts. She was refloated on 30 July and towed in to Portland, Maine. |
| Tongue Lightship | Trinity House | The lightship was run into by the steamship Rhine (United Kingdom) and sank. Her crew were rescued. |
| Vol-au-Vent | United Kingdom | The ship was driven ashore at the Grey Point Fort, County Down. She was refloated and towed in to Belfast, County Antrim. |

== 13 July ==
List of shipwrecks: 13 July 1877
| Ship | State | Description |
|---|---|---|
| Eaglet | United Kingdom | The ship departed from Nagasaki, Japan for Shanghai, China. Presumed subsequently foundered with the loss of all hands, possibly between 16 and 18 July. Wreckage thought to be from Eaglet was sighted off the Japanese coast. |
| Rob Roy, and Thames | United Kingdom | The Thames barges were run down by the steamship William Huntley (United Kingdom) and sank in the River Thames at Gravesend, Kent. Their crews were rescued. |

== 14 July ==
List of shipwrecks: 14 July 1877
| Ship | State | Description |
|---|---|---|
| Andalusia, and Angerona | United Kingdom | Angerona was run into in the River Mersey by the steamship Andalusia, which was being launched. She was beached at Egremont, Lancashire. She was refloated the next day. Andalusia was beached on the Cheshire bank of the River Mersey. |
| Mera | New Zealand | The 237-ton schooner stranded close to the mouth of the Hokianga Harbour, when the wind dropped while she was pushing through a heavy swell. |
| Royal Tar | United Kingdom | The ship was driven ashore on Öland, Sweden and was severely damaged. She was on a voyage from Sandarne, Sweden to Port Adelaide, South Australia. |
| Sappho | United Kingdom | The steam yacht was run into by the steamboat Citizen D. (United Kingdom) and sank in the River Thames All five people on board were rescued, one by Citizen D.. |

== 15 July ==
List of shipwrecks: 15 July 1877
| Ship | State | Description |
|---|---|---|
| Blessing | United Kingdom | The smack was driven ashore at Saltfleet, Lincolnshire. |
| Emma Colley | United Kingdom | The schooner was driven ashore and wrecked at Rattray Head, Aberdeenshire. Her crew were rescued. |
| Eten | United Kingdom | The ship was wrecked at Los Velos Point, near the mouth of the Choapa River, Chile with the loss of 120 lives. There were at least 43 survivors. She was on a voyage from Valparaíso, Chile to Panama City, United States of Colombia. |
| Fijenoord | Netherlands | The paddle steamer ran aground off the Hoek van Holland, South Holland. She was on a voyage from Rotterdam, South Holland to London, United Kingdom. She was refloated and resumed her voyage. |
| Lauderdale | United Kingdom | The ship departed from Nagasaki, Japan for Shanghai, China. Presumed subsequently foundered with the loss of all hands, possibly between 16 and 18 July. Wreckage thought to be from Lauderdale was sighted off the Japanese coast. |
| Thomas Alfred | Norway | The brig was driven ashore at Nasby, on the east coast of Öland, Sweden. She was on a voyage from Härnösand, Sweden to Sunderland, County Durham, United Kingdom. |
| Yarra Yarra | New South Wales | The paddle steamer foundered off Newcastle with the loss of all 30 crew. She was on a voyage from Newcastle to Sydney. |

== 16 July ==
List of shipwrecks: 16 July 1877
| Ship | State | Description |
|---|---|---|
| Alpha | Netherlands | The schooner foundered in the Baltic Sea off "Trindelen", Sweden. She was on a voyage from Malmö, Sweden to London, United Kingdom. |
| Anna Charlotte | Denmark | The schooner was driven ashore at "Segerstadt". She was on a voyage from Saint Petersburg, Russia to Christiania, Norway. |
| Bodotria | United Kingdom | The schooner ran aground in The Skerries, Anglesey and capsized. Her crew were rescued by the tug Spindrift (United Kingdom). Bodostria was on a voyage from Nantes, Loire-Inférieure, France to Liverpool, Lancashire. She was refloated by Spindrift and beached at Holyhead, Anglesey in a capsized condition. |
| Cathinka | Sweden | The ship was driven ashore at Utlängen. She was on a voyage from Kotka, Grand Duchy of Finland to Barrow-in-Furness, Lancashire, United Kingdom. |
| Cest | France | The ship was driven ashore. She was on a voyage from Pensacola, Florida, United States to Brest, Finistère. |
| Cuba | United Kingdom | The ship was towed in to Charleston, South Carolina, United States on fire and was scuttled. She was on a voyage from Montego Bay, Jamaica to London. |
| Loyal Sam | United Kingdom | The barque heeled over in a drydock at New York, United States. She was refloated and re-docked. |
| Marie | France | The steamship was lost near "Bandal". Her crew were rescued. She was on a voyage from Marseille, Bouches-du-Rhône to Nice, Alpes-Maritimes. |
| Sea King | United Kingdom | The ship ran aground in the Boe Group. Her seventeen crew were rescued on 19 July by West Australian (United Kingdom). |
| Sofia | Norway | The brig was driven ashore on the north point of Öland, Sweden. |
| Wallace | New South Wales | The ship was damaged by fire at New York. |

== 17 July ==
List of shipwrecks: 17 July 1877
| Ship | State | Description |
|---|---|---|
| Almora | United Kingdom | The steamship was damaged by fire at Port Said, Egypt. |
| Oregon | Norway | The ship ran aground on the Haaks Bank, in the North Sea off the Dutch coast and was abandoned with the loss of a crew member. She was on a voyage from Bassein, India to Bremen, Germany. She was refloated with the assistance of tugs and taken in to the Nieuwe Diep. |
| Pallas | United Kingdom | The brig was driven ashore at "Ungskar", Sweden. She was on a voyage from Pori, Grand Duchy of Finland to Shoreham-by-Sea, Sussex, United Kingdom. She was refloated on 19 July and towed in to Karlskrona, Sweden in a waterlogged condition. |

== 18 July ==
List of shipwrecks: 18 July 1877
| Ship | State | Description |
|---|---|---|
| Luzitania | Spain | The brig was wrecked near Viana do Castelo, Portugal. She was on a voyage from Almería to Antwerp, Belgium. She was refloated in early August. |
| Osborne | United Kingdom | The steamship was wrecked on the Ortiz Bank, in the River Plate with the loss of three of her eleven crew. Survivors were rescued on 20 July. She was on a voyage from Hull, Yorkshire to Buenos Aires, Argentina. |
| Sea Star | United Kingdom | The ship was abandoned in the Boe Group. Her crew were rescued by West Australian (United Kingdom). |

== 19 July ==
List of shipwrecks: 19 July 1877
| Ship | State | Description |
|---|---|---|
| America | United Kingdom | The barque sprang a leak and was beached near Villajoyosa, Spain. Her crew were rescued. |
| Duncan | United Kingdom | The steamship was wrecked on Fair Isle. Her crew were rescued. She was on a voyage from Dundee, Forfarshire to Arkhangelsk, Russia. |
| Georgios | Italy | The brig collided with the steamship Fenella (United Kingdom) and sank off Cassandreia, Greece. |
| Gustava | Germany | The brig was driven ashore on the east coast of Öland, Sweden. She was on a voyage from Gävle, Sweden to London, United Kingdom. She was refloated with assistance. |

== 20 July ==
List of shipwrecks: 20 July 1877
| Ship | State | Description |
|---|---|---|
| Alwina | Germany | The ship collided with the steamship Germania (Germany and sank in the Baltic Sea off Pillau. Her crew were rescued. Alwina was on a voyage from Königsberg to Lübeck. |

== 21 July ==
List of shipwrecks: 21 July 1877
| Ship | State | Description |
|---|---|---|
| Horatio Sprague | United States | The barque was struck by lightning and destroyed by fire at Montevideo, Uruguay. She was on a voyage from Greenock, Renfrewshire, United Kingdom to Montevideo. |
| Zeta | United Kingdom | The ship caught fire at Milford Haven, Pembrokeshire and was scuttled. |

== 22 July ==
List of shipwrecks: 22 July 1877
| Ship | State | Description |
|---|---|---|
| Annie Torrey | United States | The barque was collided with the full-rigged ship Melpomene (Germany) and was abandoned in the English Channel off Start Point, Devon, United Kingdom.Five of her crew were rescued. by Melpomene, the rest were reported missing. Annie Torrey was towed in to Cowes, Isle of Wight, United Kingdom on 24 July by the schooner Mary Seymour (United Kingdom) and two steamships. |
| George | United Kingdom | The brigantine was run into by Marie Constance (France)) off Nash Point, Glamorgan. George was taken in to by a tug, but consequently sank. All on board were rescued. She was on a voyage from Newport, Monmouthshire to Cork. |
| Sutherland | United Kingdom | The steamship collided with the steamship Duchess of Sutherland (United Kingdom) off Holyhead, Anglesey and was severely damaged. Sutherland was on a voyage from Hamburg, Germany to Liverpool, Lancashire. She was taken in to Holyhead. |
| Ymer | Sweden | The steamship foundered north west of Hanstholmen, Denmark. Her crew were rescued by the steamship Sveridge (Sweden). Ymer was on a voyage from Vestervig, Denmark to Hull, Yorkshire, United Kingdom. |

== 23 July ==
List of shipwrecks: 23 July 1877
| Ship | State | Description |
|---|---|---|
| Albert | United Kingdom | The schooner was driven ashore at Kalmar, Sweden. She was on a voyage from Workington, Cumberland to Kemi, Grand Duchy of Finland. She was refloated. |
| Eckro | Sweden | The schooner put in to Grimstad, Norway in a waterlogged condition. She was on a voyage from Sundsvall to Antwerp, Belgium. |
| Feronia | United Kingdom | The ship was wrecked on Diu Island, Portuguese India with loss of life. She was on a voyage from Bombay, India to Rangoon, Burma. |
| Helena | United Kingdom | The steam lighter foundered 3 nautical miles (5.6 km) off Campbeltown, Argyllshire. Her crew were rescued. She was on a voyage from Kirkintilloch, Dunbartonshire to Campbeltown. |
| Osborne | United Kingdom | The barque was wrecked on the Ortis Bank, in the River Plate with the loss of three of her eleven crew. She was on a voyage from Hull, Yorkshire to Buenos Aires, Argentina. |
| Reliance | United Kingdom | The schooner collided with brig Twalf (Norway) and sank. Reliance was on a voyage from Königsberg, Germany to Leith, Lothian. |
| Tribune | United Kingdom | The ship was driven ashore and wrecked at Ras Hafun, Majeerteen Sultanate. Her crew were rescued. She was on a voyage from Liverpool, Lancashire to Aden, Aden Colony. |
| Four unnamed vessels | Ottoman Empire | Russo-Turkish War: The steamships were attacked at Slobozia, United Principalities by Russian artillery. Three were destroyed and the fourth sank in the Ialomița. |

== 24 July ==
List of shipwrecks: 24 July 1877
| Ship | State | Description |
|---|---|---|
| Criccieth Castle | United Kingdom | The ship ran aground on the Rhinplatte, in the North Sea. She was on a voyage from Hamburg, Germany to Gävle, Sweden. |
| Mary Roberts | United Kingdom | The schooner ran aground on the Hoxey Spit, off the coast of Hampshire. She was on a voyage from London to Silloth, Cumberland. |
| Nautilus | United Kingdom | The ship ran aground near Vaxholm, Sweden. She was on a voyage from Hull, Yorkshire to Stockholm, Sweden. She was refloated and taken in to Vaxholm. |
| Rebecca | Austria-Hungary | The barque collided with the steamship Crosby (United Kingdom) and ran aground at Leith, Lothian, United Kingdom. Rebecca was on a voyage from Leith to Genoa, Italy. |

== 25 July ==
List of shipwrecks: 25 July 1877
| Ship | State | Description |
|---|---|---|
| City of Hobart | Tasmania | The collier sprang a leak and foundered 60 nautical miles (110 km) northeast of Wilson's Promontory, Victoria. Her crew were rescued. She was on a voyage from Hobart to Melbourne, Victoria. |
| Criterion | United Kingdom | The steamship foundered off the coast of Jutland. Her 21 crew were rescued by the smacks Garland and Signal (both United Kingdom). Criterion was on a voyage from Kronstadt, Russia to London. |
| Cromwell | United Kingdom | The steamship ran aground at Liverpool, Lancashire. She was on a voyage from Pomaron, Portugal to Liverpool. She was refloated with the assistance of a tug and taken in to Garston, Lancashire. |
| Cumberland | Canada | Cumberland's wreck, ca. 2008 The sidewheel paddle steamer ran aground on a reef in Lake Superior off the west coast of Isle Royale near Rock of Ages Light. Salvage attempts failed, and she broke up on the reef on 18 August and was completely submerged by early September. |
| Rosario | United Kingdom | The steamship was wrecked near Ouessant, Finistère, France. All on board were rescued. She was on a voyage from Oran, Algeria to London. |
| Susan E. Valis | United States | The barque was driven ashore and wrecked at "Bendamoor Lunkah", on the Coromandel Coast of India. Her crew were rescued. |

== 26 July ==
List of shipwrecks: 26 July 1877
| Ship | State | Description |
|---|---|---|
| Catherina | Denmark | The ship was wrecked in a typhoon at Yokohama, Japan with the loss of four of her crew. |
| Flying Cloud | (United Kingdom) Guernsey | The brigantine ran aground on the Goodwin Sands, Kent. She was on a voyage from Guernsey to London. She floated off but consequently foundered. Her crew were rescued by the tug Cruiser and by Kingsdown boatmen. |
| Milo | United Kingdom | The ship capsized in the Atlantic Ocean and was abandoned. She was on a voyage from Liverpool, Lancashire to Miramichi, New Brunswick, Canada. |

== 27 July ==
List of shipwrecks: 27 July 1877
| Ship | State | Description |
|---|---|---|
| Eliza | United Kingdom | The ketch ran aground on the Drumroe Bank, in the Irish Sea off the coast of County Waterford. She was on a voyage from Waterford to Cardiff, Glamorgan. |
| Sancta Maria | Denmark | The schooner ran aground on the Haisborough Sands, in the North Sea off the coast of Norfolk, United Kingdom. She was on a voyage from Denmark to Exeter, Devon, United Kingdom. She was refloated and put in to Dover, Kent, United Kingdom in a leaky condition. |
| Saucy Polly | United Kingdom | The fishing vessel was run into by the steamship Dudley (United Kingdom) and sank off Southwold, Suffolk. Her crew were rescued by Dudley. |

== 28 July ==
List of shipwrecks: 28 July 1877
| Ship | State | Description |
|---|---|---|
| Anna Ottilie | Flag unknown | The ship ran aground near Bridport, Dorset, United Kingdom. She was on a voyage from Riga, Russia to Bridport. She was refloated and found to be leaky. |
| Bertha | Norway | The barque was driven ashore on Saltholm, Denmark. She was on a voyage from Vyborg, Grand Duchy of Finland to Bordeaux, Gironde, France. She was refloated with assistance from the steamship Harriet (Denmark) and resumed her voyage. |
| Jean Celestine | France | The ship ran aground on the Pennington Spit, off the coast of Hampshire, United Kingdom. She was on a voyage from Nantes, Loire-Inférieure to Boulogne, Pas-de-Calais. |
| Summer Fly | (United Kingdom) Guernsey | The schooner ran aground on the Holm Sand, in the North Sea off the coast of Suffolk. She was on a voyage from Middlesbrough, Yorkshire to Manningtree, Essex. She was refloated and assisted in to Lowestoft, Suffolk. |

== 29 July ==
List of shipwrecks: 29 July 1877
| Ship | State | Description |
|---|---|---|
| Gloucester | United Kingdom | The ship foundered. Her crew were rescued. |

== 30 July ==
List of shipwrecks: 30 July 1877
| Ship | State | Description |
|---|---|---|
| Bylgia | Sweden | The steamship ran aground at Karlsøy, Norway. She was on a voyage from Arkhangelsk, Russia to an English port. She was a total loss. |
| Helena | Netherlands | The steamship ran aground off Goeree-Overflakkee, Zeeland. She was on a voyage from Kronstadt, Russia to Hellevoetsluis, Zeeland. She was refloated the next day with the assistance of tugs and taken in to Hellevoetsluis. |
| Merry Monarch, and Wimbledon Park | United Kingdom | The steamship No. 84 (United Kingdom) collided with the barque Merry Monarch, which was severely damaged and the schooner Wimbledon Park, which sank in the River Wear. Wimbledon Park was refloated and repaired. |
| Vespasian | United Kingdom | The steamship struck the Bishop Rock, Cornwall and was severely damaged at the bow. She was on a voyage from Liverpool, Lancashire to Naples, Italy. She put back to Liverpool. |

== 31 July ==
List of shipwrecks: 31 July 1877
| Ship | State | Description |
|---|---|---|
| Dido | United Kingdom | The barque was driven ashore. She was on a voyage from Runcorn, Cheshire to Llandulas, Anglesey. |
| England | United Kingdom | The fishing smack was driven ashore and wrecked at Flamborough Head, Yorkshire. Her crew were rescued. |
| Excel | United Kingdom | The brig ran aground on the Gunfleet Sand, in the North Sea off the coast of Essex. She was refloated and resumed her voyage in a leaky condition with the assistance of three smacks. |
| Gustave Emile | France | The ship was wrecked near Le Touquet, Pas-de-Calais. She was on a voyage from Havre de Grâce, Seine-Inférieure to Ipswich, Suffolk, United Kingdom. |
| Iquique | United Kingdom | The steamship struck a sunken rock at Iquique, Peru and was a total loss. Her crew were rescued. |
| Maharajah | United Kingdom | The steamship ran aground off Terschelling, Friesland, Netherlands. She was refloated and resumed her voyage. |
| Var | France | The steamship was driven ashore near Agde, Hérault. She was on a voyage from Marseille, Bouches-du-Rhône to Agde. |

== Unknown date ==
List of shipwrecks: Unknown date in July 1877
| Ship | State | Description |
|---|---|---|
| Alice Wilson | United Kingdom | The ship ran aground in the Saint Lawrence River. She was on a voyage from Quebec City, Canada to Liverpool, Lancashire. She was refloated and resumed her voyage. |
| Arethusa | United Kingdom | The steamship ran aground on the Mowscior Reef, off Malta on or before 10 July. She was on a voyage from Alexandria, Egypt to an English port. |
| Bee | United Kingdom | The ship capsized and sank at Cowes, Isle of Wight. Her crew survived. |
| Bertha and Maria | United Kingdom | The ship was abandoned at sea with some loss of life. She was on a voyage from Port-au-Prince, Haiti to Falmouth, Cornwall. |
| Breeze | United Kingdom | The Yorkshire Billyboy collided with HMS Wye (Royal Navy) in the River Thames at Charlton, Kent. She consequently sank at Silvertown, Essex. |
| Carl Johann | Norway | The barque foundered in the White Sea before 27 July. |
| Carondelet | United States | The ship ran aground on Foweys Rock. She was on a voyage from New York to Havana, Cuba. She was refloated and resumed her voyage. |
| Courrier du Canada | France | The ship put in to Tybee Island, Georgia, United States in a waterlogged condition. She was consequently condemned. |
| Die Ceiden Bruder | Germany | The ship was driven ashore near "Bjerregaard", Denmark. She was on a voyage from Fredrikstad, Denmark to Brake. |
| Enterprise | South Australia | The steamship ran aground at the mouth of the Murray River. |
| Fleetford | United Kingdom | The ship was driven ashore. She was on a voyage from Jarvis Island to Queenstown, County Cork. She was refloated and put in to Honolulu, Kingdom of Hawaii. |
| Governor Morton | United States | The ship caught fire at New Orleans, Louisiana and was scuttled. She was on a voyage from New Orleans to Grimsby, Lincolnshire, United Kingdom. |
| Groningen | Netherlands | The ship was wrecked on the coast of Mexico. |
| Guayacaru | Chile | The steamship was driven ashore by a freshet at Constitución. |
| Helga | Norway | The ship was abandoned in a sinking condition 6 nautical miles (11 km) south west of Hanstholm, Denmark. Her crew were rescued. |
| Helsingør | Denmark | The barque was driven ashore at Melby. She was on a voyage from Rauma, Grand Duchy of Finland to Barcelona, Spain. She was refloated and resumed her voyage. |
| Hoppet | Flag unknown | The brig was driven ashore near the Blåvand Lighthouse, Denmark after 19 July. She was on a voyage form Hamburg, Germany to Rauma. |
| Impi | Russia | The schooner was driven ashore at Näsby, on the east coast of Öland, Sweden. She was on a voyage from Russia to Montrose, Forfarshire, United Kingdom. She was refloated and resumed her voyage. |
| Jason | United Kingdom | The ship was driven ashore in the Bedford Channel. |
| Kartal | Ottoman Navy | Russo-Turkish War: The paddle steamer was driven ashore at Kiliia, Russia. She was refloated with assistance from Hifz-ur Rahman (Ottoman Navy). |
| Kurrachee | United Kingdom | The steamship was wrecked on an uncharted rock in the Forrest Strait. |
| Lena | United Kingdom | The steamship caught fire at Alexandria, Egypt. |
| Mary Francis | United Kingdom | The cutter was driven ashore and sank at Saint Aubin, Jersey, Channel Islands. |
| Mary Shepherd | United Kingdom | The East Indiaman was wrecked at Labang, Malaya with the loss of four of her crew. She was on a voyage from Hong Kong to Manila, Spanish East Indies. |
| Modesto | Germany | The sloop was wrecked at Rügenwalde. Her crew were rescued. |
| Nereid | United Kingdom | The ship was wrecked on Machias Seal Island, New Brunswick, Canada. She was on a voyage from Boston to Saint John, New Brunswick. |
| Olga | United Kingdom | The ship was driven ashore. She was on a voyage from Saint John, New Brunswick, Canada to Newry, County Antrim. She was refloated and taken in to Eastport, Maine, United States. |
| Prince Oscar | Flag unknown | The ship collided with Haddon Hall (United Kingdom) and the tug Courthey (India) and ran aground at Diamond Harbour, India before 14 July.Prince Oscar was on a voyage from Mauritius to Calcutta, India. She was refloated the next day. |
| Screamer | United States | The ship was damaged by fire at New Orleans. She was on a voyage from New Orleans to Havre de Grâce, Seine-Inférieure, France. |
| Serene | Belgium | The lighter sank at Antwerp. |
| Sophie | Sweden | The brig was driven ashore on Gotland, Sweden. She was on a voyage from Söderhamn, Sweden to Grangemouth, Stirlingshire, United Kingdom. She was refloated and taken in to Copenhagen, Denmark, where she arrived on 26 July. |
| Souvenir | United Kingdom | The brig was abandoned off Ouessant, Finistère, France. Her crew were rescued by the steamship Cerwyn (United Kingdom). Souvenir was on a voyage from Liverpool, Lancashire to Santander, Spain, or from Santander to Falmouth. |
| Svalen | Norway | The brig was driven ashore on Öland. She was on a voyage from Söderhamn, Sweden to Honfleur, Manche, France. She was refloated and taken in to Copenhagen, where she arrived on 26 July. |
| Trito | Russia | The ship was wrecked on Gross Island, in the White Sea on or before 11 July. Her crew were rescued. |
| Willie | (Canada) | The brigantine was driven ashore at Judique, Nova Scotia. |
| Young Australian | Queensland | The ship was wrecked near Warrnambool, Victoria with the loss of a crew member. |
