= Tun Thura Thet =

Burmese technology specialist and entrepreneur

- Born: 1971 (age 54–55); Yangon, Myanmar
- Education: Nanyang Technological University
- Occupations: Technology specialist, entrepreneur

Tun Thura Thet (Burmese: ထွန်းသူရသက်) is a Burmese technology specialist, a technopreneur and an academic.

Tun is the CEO and Chief Solutions Architect of Nirvasoft Pte Ltd., a Singapore based software company specializing on enterprise AI solutions and digital innovation. Tun is the founder and chairman of Myanmar Information Technology (MIT) Pte Ltd, the leading software development and System Integration Company in Myanmar.

Tun is an Adjunct Professor at Multimedia University, Malaysia. He also teaches at the Yangon University Economics (YUEco), Meiktila University of Economics, and University of Computer Studies, Yangon (UCSY) in Master of Business, Executive Master of Business, Master of Banking and Finance and Master Computer Science programs.

He is also the special guest speaker at the NTU Convocation 2015 and the recipient of the NTU Alumni Achievement Award 2021, Nanyang Technological University, Singapore.

He is also a co-founder and director of Myanmar ICT Development Corporation, the MICT Park; an elected director of Myanmar Institute of Directors, MIoD and an independent director of Myanmar Credit Bureau.

== Education and career ==
Thet received a Bachelor of Commerce degree from Curtin University of Technology in Perth, Australia, in 1995. He went on to earn a Master of Business Administration from the Yangon University of Economics in 1999. He later pursued graduate studies at Nanyang Technological University in Singapore, as an ASEAN scholarship holder completing a Master of Science in 2006 and a Doctor of Philosophy in 2009.

Tun established MIT in 1997 and is considered one of the pioneers in Myanmar's then-nascent field of information technology. MIT provides ICT services in banking, retail, hospitality, healthcare, and digital innovation technology-related services in Myanmar and regional markets. MIT was the ASEAN Business Award winner for the e-ASEAN sector in 2015, ASOCIO 2018 Outstanding ICT Company Award and ASOCIO 2023 HealthTech Award.

In addition, Tun has led Nirvasoft Pte Ltd with his vision of providing affordable Enterprise AI for small and medium-sized enterprises, earning the prestigious ASOCIO AI Service Provider Award 2025, presented by the Asian-Oceanian Computing Industry Organization (ASOCIO).

== Publications ==
- Thet, Tun Thura; Na, Jin-Cheon; Khoo, Christopher S. G. (2007), Automatic Classification of Web Search Results: Product Review vs. Non-review Documents, Lecture Notes in Computer Science, vol. 4822, Berlin, Heidelberg: Springer Berlin Heidelberg, pp. 65–74, doi:10.1007/978-3-540-77094-7_13, ISBN 978-3-540-77093-0
- Thet, Tun Thura; Na, Jin-Cheon; Khoo, Christopher S. G. (2007-08-28). "Filtering product reviews from web search results". Proceedings of the 2007 ACM symposium on Document engineering. New York, NY, USA: ACM. pp. 196–198. doi:10.1145/1284420.1284467. ISBN 978-1-59593-776-6.
- Tun Thura Thet; Na, Jin-Cheon; Wunna Ko Ko (2008-04-03). "Word segmentation for the Myanmar language". Journal of Information Science. 34 (5): 688–704. doi:10.1177/0165551507086258. ISSN 0165-5515.
- Na, Jin-Cheon; Thet, Tun Thura; Goh, Dion Hoe-Lian; Theng, Yin-Leng; Foo, Schubert (2009), "Word Segmentation in Indo-China Languages for Digital Libraries", Handbook of Research on Digital Libraries, IGI Global, pp. 243–250, doi:10.4018/978-1-59904-879-6.ch024, ISBN 978-1-59904-879-6
- Thet, Tun Thura; Na, Jin-Cheon; Khoo, Christopher S. G. (2008), "Sentiment Classification of Movie Reviews Using Multiple Perspectives", Lecture Notes in Computer Science, Berlin, Heidelberg: Springer Berlin Heidelberg, pp. 184–193, doi:10.1007/978-3-540-89533-6_19, ISBN 978-3-540-89532-9
- Na, Jin-Cheon; Thet, Tun Thura (2009-05-19). "Effectiveness of web search results for genre and sentiment classification". Journal of Information Science. 35 (6): 709–726. doi:10.1177/0165551509104233. ISSN 0165-5515.
- Na, Jin-Cheon; Thet, Tun Thura; Nasution, Arie Hans; Hassan, Fauzi Munif (2011). "A Sentiment-Based Digital Library of Movie Review Documents Using Fedora / Une bibliothèque numérique de documents critiques de films basée sur les sentiments en utilisant Fedora". Canadian Journal of Information and Library Science. 35 (3): 307–337. doi:10.1353/ils.2011.0018. ISSN 1920-7239.
- Thet, Tun Thura; Na, Jin-Cheon; Khoo, Christopher S.G.; Shakthikumar, Subbaraj (2009-11-06). "Sentiment analysis of movie reviews on discussion boards using a linguistic approach". Proceedings of the 1st international CIKM workshop on Topic-sentiment analysis for mass opinion. New York, NY, USA: ACM. pp. 81–84. doi:10.1145/1651461.1651476. ISBN 978-1-60558-805-6.
- Na, Jin-Cheon; Thura Thet, Tun; Khoo, Christopher S.G. (2010-04-20). "Comparing sentiment expression in movie reviews from four online genres". Online Information Review. 34 (2): 317–338. doi:10.1108/14684521011037016. ISSN 1468-4527.
- Tun Thura Thet; Na, Jin-Cheon; Khoo, Christopher S.G. (2010-11-15). "Aspect-based sentiment analysis of movie reviews on discussion boards". Journal of Information Science. 36 (6): 823–848. doi:10.1177/0165551510388123. ISSN 0165-5515.
- Na, Jin-Cheon; Thet, Tun Thura; Khoo, Christopher S. G.; Kyaing, Wai Yan Min (2011), "Visual Sentiment Summarization of Movie Reviews", Lecture Notes in Computer Science, Berlin, Heidelberg: Springer Berlin Heidelberg, pp. 277–287, doi:10.1007/978-3-642-24826-9_34, ISBN 978-3-642-24825-2
