= Zaw Zaw Aung =

Burmese artist

- ဇော်ဇော်အောင်
- Born: 1971 (age 54–55); Danubyu, Irrawaddy Division, Burma
- Education: Yangon State School of Fine Arts
- Website: www.artistzawzawaung.com

Zaw Zaw Aung (Burmese: ဇော်ဇော်အောင်; born 1971) is a Burmese artist.

Zaw Zaw Aung was born at Danubyu, Irrawaddy Division, Burma, in 1971. He graduated from Yangon State School of Fine Arts in 1990. He has participated in many local and overseas shows and his works have been collected by the National Museum of Singapore, Jenidong Park Medical Centre, Brunei, Simon & Helena Arts Services, Singapore, Strand Hotel of Yangon, Myanmar and Art Asia NYC, New York. He was co-author of Art Standards with Kin Maung Yin.

== Museum Collections ==
- Singapore Art Museum
