= Tame (surname) =

Tame is a surname. Notable people with the surname include:

- Chris Tame (1949–2006), British libertarian political activist
- David Tame (born 1953), British author
- Grace Tame (born 1994), Australian activist and 2021 Australian of the Year
- Jack Tame (born 1987), New Zealand television and radio journalist
- John Tame (c. 1430-1500), British merchant
- Johnny Tame (1947–2022), German singer songwriter and guitarist
- Kevin Tame (1931–1995), Australian rules footballer
- Michael Tame (born 1956), Australian cricketer
