= Kin Maung =

Burmese painter (1910–1983)

Khin Maung (Bank)
- ခင်မောင်
- Born: 1910; Tantse, Shwebo District, British Burma
- Died: 20 December 1983 (aged 73); Mandalay, Myanmar
- Known for: Painting
- Movement: Mandalay School, Modern art and graphic art

Khin Maung (Bank) (ခင်မောင် [kʰɪ̀ɰ̃ màʊɰ̃]; 1910 – 20 December 1983) was a Burmese painter and sponsor of the arts who was influential in the art world of Mandalay, Myanmar. More importantly, however, he was the major force for the development of a modernistic movement in painting in Burma, which began in the early 1960s.

In 1952, Khin Maung became a bank manager, and thus he is often referred to as Khin Maung (Bank) to differentiate him from another Burmese painter Khin Maung (Yangon). The names of both Khin Maung (Bank) and Khin Maung (Yangon) are sometimes spelled as "Khin Maung".

== Life ==
Khin Maung (Bank) was born in 1910 at Tantse (တန့်ဆည်), Shwebo District, the second son of a merchant, and became interested in painting at an early age. He began his formal training through a correspondence course from the London-based Press Art School in 1933. In 1934, he took further correspondence courses from (Pyinmana) U Hla and the London School of Fine Arts. He started drawing cartoons and commercial paintings in 1935. He was interested in modern art and graphic art, and after World War II first began teaching these subjects to two young Mandalay artists, Win Pe and Paw Oo Thet, who would both, in turn, have a great impact on the movement in modernistic painting in Burma.

He wrote and gave workshops about modern art, explaining the principles to other artists. In the 1960s, when a movement in modernistic painting began to bloom for the first time in Burma, he exhibited his works in Rangoon, as his students Paw Oo Thet and Win Pe and many other painters with modernistic inclinations were also doing. Along with Bagyi Aung Soe, he is considered one of the founders of modernistic art in Myanmar, but it is very likely that Khin Maung's interest preceded Aung Soe's as he was roughly 15 years older than Aung Soe and there is evidence that his first fully conceived work of modernistic painting occurred as early as 1945 or 1946. In Southeast Asian terms, this would roughly put him on par in time with painters such as Affandi in Indonesia, who were turning to modernistic painting during the same decade. With respect to Burma, Khin Maung may be accurately called the "Father of Modernistic Painting" there.

Khin Maung helped organize art exhibitions in Mandalay and Yangon, and in 1971 he was one of the founders of Lokanat Galleries, an early art gallery in Yangon which is still active today. He worked closely with other Mandalay artists such as Aye Kyaw, Ba Thet and Aung Khin. Khin Maung died on 20 December 1983 in Mandalay.

== Work ==
Khin Maung's painting techniques were influenced by European theories and techniques, derived initially from the British artists in Myanmar during the colonial era. He is known, for instance, to have done early paintings in the British Watercolor School style, which his Mandalay predecessors, Ba Zaw, Saya Saung, and Ba Thet, were fond of (though Ba Thet would ultimately rebel against this style). Later, he became intensely interested in the 20th century European and American movements in modernistic painting. His work was not aggressively modernistic, but it did show cubist and other vanguard influences. The most provocative aspect of Khin Maung's work, however, is that in searching for a modernistic idiom which would suit Burma and not disenchant the conservative tendencies of Burmese culture, he also deeply sought inspiration from the mural painting of Bagan, which was 800 years or so old. This leap in thought was rather brilliant, for it revealed to Burmese painters who were interested in modernising stagnant forms of painting in Burma, namely naturalism and realism, that they did not have to wholly mimic or entirely borrow from the outside world to do so. They could find plenty of inspiration for figurative or non-figurative abstraction in the history of Burmese art itself, in the ruins at Bagan.

== See also ==
- Ba Thet
- Paw Oo Thet
- Aung Khin

== Bibliography ==
- Ranard, Andrew (2009). "The Early Mandalay School: The Core Group". Burmese Painting : A Linear and Lateral History. Silkworm Books. pp. 215–225. ISBN 978-974-9511-76-3.
- Amar, Ludu Daw (1997). Modern Burmese Painting (in Burmese). Yarbye Press and Kyibwa Press.
