= Ba Thet =

Burmese painter

- ဘသက်
- Born: 1903; British Burma
- Died: 1972 (aged 68–69)
- Known for: Painting
- Movement: Mandalay School

Ba Thet (1903–1972; Burmese: ဘသက် [ba̰ θɛʔ]) was a Burmese painter who worked in Mandalay, Myanmar and who was known as an advocate of experimentation in the arts. He was an associate of Kin Maung, who is commonly known in Burma as Kin Maung (Bank) to differentiate him from another painter of some renown, Kin Maung (Yangon). Kin Maung (Bank) is generally regarded as the "Father of Modernist Painting" in Burma.

== Early life ==
The early stories about Ba Thet while he was an adolescent and teenager in training to become an artist are of a legendary quality. He was regarded as something of a prodigy of the arts in Burma because he never acquired his skills through formal training, rather by "seeing and doing." In addition, he had little taste for master-apprentice relations and no sooner had he mastered an art form than he was flouting the conventions of the genre. Some of the early stories about him are undoubtedly apocryphal but there are so many of them that they do clearly indicate the unconventional and somewhat rebellious character of the man. For example, there is a story of him as an adolescent learning Traditional Burmese floral painting from a Mandalay master and being able to reproduce such designs, of a high quality, in the space of a single session. Another story tells of him when he was older and studying goldsmithing as an apprentice, casually producing gold bracelets of a high quality for a client when the master stepped out—appalling his fellow apprentices with his audacity. Another time, as a youngster, he was studying with a Mandalay jade sculptor and was able to produce a ball of jade which the master said was of a standard produced by Hong Kong jade masters.

== Work as a painter ==
Ultimately, Ba Thet settled upon painting as his favorite art medium and studied watercolor painting informally from Maung Maung Gyi, Ba Zaw, and Saya Saung, through observation and helping his teachers. It is said that Ba Thet and Ba Nyan were among the first Burmese painters to paint in the western style, but it must be acknowledged that other painters, such as his teachers or M.T. Hla (U Tun Hla), preceded him. He is an important painter because he encouraged individuality, creativity, experimentation and modern concepts in his art.

He remained a watercolor painter for many years, painting many Upper Burma scenes of a rote iconic character (Mandalay Palace scenes, Irrawaddy River scenes, et al.) which were very much in the British Watercolor style. However, in the 1990s, unusual works by Ba Thet began to emerge in Burma that indicated he was much bored with this watercolor style and was searching for a more adventuresome form of painting. The Mandalay painter and art dealer Myo Khin has described Ba Thet's path as one of rebellion against the "Royal Academy Style", meaning British watercolor painting.

In Ba Thet's last years, he began to paint oils and some of these works such as Novitiation Pageant and Ba Thet's Anatomy Lesson (in which he spoofed the painting of the European anatomy lesson in a surgical theater, done by Rembrandt and others) were surprising. Such works have made characterizing Ba Thet's oeuvre very difficult, for it is full of odd leaps and jumps. The man was a true eccentric.

== His students ==
Two of Ba Thet's major students were Win Pe (not be confused with the contemporary painter in his early 60s Win Pe Myint) and Paw Oo Thet. Ba Thet's friend and painter Kin Maung (Bank) was interested in creating a modernist art movement in Burma and Ba Thet shared such sympathies. Thus, after Win and Paw Oo Thet expressed interest in modernist art, Ba Thet sent the two boys to Kin Maung (Bank) for periodic instruction in more modern concepts of painting.

Ba Thet was also the teacher of the major painter Ba Yin Galay and the highly regarded painter Shwe Aung Thein, both of whose work took experimental turns. The watercolorist Lu Tin was another of his pupils, and expressed deep respect for his teachings.

== Museum collections ==
- National Museum of Myanmar

== See also ==
- Saya Saung
- Kin Maung (Bank)
- Paw Oo Thet

== Bibliography ==
- Ranard, Andrew (2009). "The Early Mandalay School: The Core Group". Burmese Painting : A Linear and Lateral History. Silkworm Books. pp. 126–134. ISBN 978-974-9511-76-3.
- Amar, Ludu Daw (1997). Modern Burmese Painting (in Burmese). Yarbye Press and Kyibwa Press.
