= Lu Tin =

- လူတင်
- Born: 1930; Monywa, British Burma
- Died: 2014 (aged 83–84)
- Known for: Painting

Lu Tin (လူတင်, pronounced [lù tɪ̀ɰ̃]; 1930–2014) was a Burmese watercolour artist.

== Life ==
Lu Tin was born in 1930 in Monywa in northwestern Burma, son of a mason, and entered a monastery for his education. In the period immediately after World War II he lived by various jobs including knitting and weaving, masonry and tailoring. In 1950, a monk helped him to start studying under Aung Chit, an artist who painted cover designs for the Ludu Journal in Mandalay. He attended the Mandalay Fine Arts School (1953–1956), obtaining a Bachelor's degree in Fine Arts. After graduating, he taught art at high schools in Mandalay. In 1972 he became an art tutor at the Meiktila Teachers’ College, and in 1978 became head of the Art Department of the University for Development of National Races.

Retiring in 1981, Lu Tin devoted himself to painting. He exhibited in many one-man shows in Yangon, Monywa and Mandalay. In 1991, he opened a gallery in Monywa called "Vision House". In 2000, to mark his 70th birthday, an exhibition 71 Lu Tin’s best paintings was shown in locations around the country. Lu Tin died in 2014.

== Work ==
According to Ant Maung, "throughout his entire life as an artist, Lu Tin has managed like no other to reflect the beauties of the various periods and times of the day – dawn, sunrise, daybreak, daytime, dusk, nightfall, twilight. When I try to picture the best of his works, his watercolours of Myanmar’s coastal regions, the jade mines in Kachin State, and the western stretches of the Ayeyawady River, all stand out in my mind". His work is completed quickly, with painting taking perhaps 20 minutes, but he explains that thinking about what he wants the picture to look like takes much longer. Often the pictures are executed in a green monotone, using tiny brushes, and depict the natural features of Chindwin region. He names Kan Nyunt, Chit Mye, and in particular Ba Thet as his teachers.
