= Tame =

Tame may refer to:

- Taming, the act of training wild animals
- River Tame, Greater Manchester
- River Tame, West Midlands and the Tame Valley
- Tame, Arauca, a Colombian town and municipality
- "Tame" (song), a song by the Pixies from their 1989 album Doolittle
- TAME (IATA code: EQ), flag carrier of Ecuador
- tert-Amyl methyl ether, an oxygenated chemical compound often added to gasoline
- 1,1,1-Tris(aminomethyl)ethane, polyamine chelating ligand
- Tame, a variety of the Idi language of Papua New Guinea
- Tame (surname), people with the surname
- Tame Impala, the psychedelic music project of Australian multi-instrumentalist Kevin Parker.
