= Monywa University of Economics =

Higher education institute in Kachin State, Myanmar

- မုံရွာစီးပွားရေးတက္ကသိုလ်
- Type: Public
- Established: 28 September 1998; 27 years ago
- Affiliations: Ministry of Education
- Rector: Dr Ni Lar Myint Htoo
- Undergraduates: 2100 (2002)
- Postgraduates: 200 (2002)
- Location: Nan-Da-Won Qr, Monywa, Sagaing Region, Myanmar; 22°07′57″N 95°10′47″E
- Campus: Monywa
- Website: www.mue.edu.mm

The Monywa University of Economics (Burmese: မုံရွာ စီးပွားရေးတက္ကသိုလ် [mòʊɰ̃jwà síbwájé tɛʔkəθò]), located in Monywa, Sagaing Region, is one of four universities of economics and business in Myanmar. The university offers undergraduate and graduate degrees and diplomas, mostly in commerce, statistics and economics. It also has a small stable of graduate degree programs, including a full-time MBA program.

== History ==
For allowing easy access to the economics academia to the students from upper Myanmar, an economics college was founded in the east of Monywa, south of Kyaukka Road, on 200 acres of land near Za Loke village, on 1 July 1993.

On 28 September 1998, the Ministry of Education upgraded the Monywa Economics College to the Monywa Institute of Economics. The university has been established to provide economists for national development.

On 3 September 2014, the Monywa Institute of Economics was renamed as Monywa University of Economics. The Monywa University of Economics has opened the first MPA and MBA programs as the economics universities and is one of the country's well-known economics universities in upper Myanmar.

== Programs ==
The university mainly offers PhD, bachelor's degree and undergraduate diploma programs. Regular bachelor's degree programs take four years and Honors programs take five years. The master's programs take two years. The PhD programs take five years. The university's Human Resource Development (HRD) Center offers undergraduate diploma and certificate programs in Certificate in Advanced Business Studies (CABS), Post-Graduate Diploma in Development Studies (Dip.DS), Post-Graduate Diploma in Research Studies(DBS), etc.

=== Overview ===
Program	Bachelor's	Master's	Doctoral
Accounting	BAct	MAct	PhD(Commerce)
Applied Economics	N/A	N/A	N/A
Business Administration	BBA	MBA	PhD(Commerce)
Commerce	BCom	MCom	PhD(Commerce)
Development Studies	N/A	N/A	N/A
Economics	BEcon	MEcon	PhD(Economics)
Management Studies	N/A	N/A	N/A
Population Studies	N/A	N/A	N/A
Public Administration	N/A	MPA	N/A
Statistics	BEcon(Statistics)	MEcon(Statistics)	PhD(Statistics)

== See also ==
- Yangon University of Economics
- Meiktila University of Economics
