= Dong Kingman =

American painter

Dong Kingman (Chinese: 曾景文; pinyin: Zéng Jǐngwén, 31 March 1911– 12 May 2000) was a Chinese American artist and one of America's leading watercolor masters. As a painter on the forefront of the California Style School of painting, he was known for his urban and landscape paintings, as well as his graphic design work in the Hollywood film industry. He has won widespread critical acclaim and his works are included in over 50 public and private collections worldwide, including the Metropolitan Museum of Art; Museum of Fine Arts, Boston; Brooklyn Museum; de Young Museum; Art Institute of Chicago; and the National Gallery of Art in Washington, DC.

== Overview ==
Dong Kingman was born Dong Moy Shu in Oakland, California, the son of Chinese immigrants from Hong Kong. At the age of five and a half, he traveled with his family back to Hong Kong, where his father established a dry goods business. He began his formal education at the Bok Jai School, where he was given a school name in accordance with Chinese customs. Hearing that he aspired to be an artist, his instructor gave him the name "King Man" (lit. "scenery" and "composition" in Cantonese). He would later combine the two names into Kingman, placing his family name first in accordance with Chinese naming conventions, creating the name Dong Kingman.

Kingman continued his education at the Chan Sun Wen School, where he excelled at calligraphy and watercolor painting. He studied under Szeto Wai, the Paris-trained head of the Lingnan Academy. It was under Szeto's instruction that Kingman was first exposed to Northern European trends. Kingman would later state that Szeto was his "first and only true influence."

Kingman returned to the United States in his late teens. In 1929 he attended the Fox Morgan Art School while holding down a variety of jobs. It was at this time that he chose to concentrate on watercolor painting.

His critical breakthrough occurred in 1936, when he gained a solo exhibition at the San Francisco Art Association. This exhibition brought him national recognition and success.

In the late 1930s, Kingman served as an artist in the Works Progress Administration, painting over 300 works with the relief program. In 1942 and 1944, Kingman received the Guggenheim Fellowship. During World War II, he was drafted into the U.S. Army, but was transferred to work as a map artist in the Office of Strategic Services at Camp Beal, California and Washington, D.C, by a fan of his work, Eleanor Roosevelt.

Kingman settled in Brooklyn, New York after the war, where he held a position as an art instructor at Columbia University and Hunter College from 1946 for the next ten years. In New York he was associated with Midtown, Wildenstein and Hammer galleries.

Kingman had married Janice Wong in 1926. She died in 1954 and he married the writer Helena Kuo in 1956. Kuo died in 1999.

During the 1950s, Kingman served as a United States cultural ambassador and international lecturer for the Department of State. In the 1950s and 1960s, Kingman worked as an illustrator in the film industry, designing the backgrounds for a number of major motion pictures including "55 Days at Peking", The Sand Pebbles and the Hollywood adaptation of "Flower Drum Song". Over 300 of his film-related works are permanently housed at the Fairbanks Center for Motion Picture Study at the Margaret Herrick Library of the Academy of Motion Picture Arts and Sciences in Beverly Hills, California.

Kingman was faculty at the Famous Artists School and his students included artists Win Pe and Paw Oo Thet, among others.

In 1981, Kingman made history as the first American artist to be featured in a solo exhibition following the resumption of diplomatic relations between the U.S. and China when the Ministry of Culture of the People's Republic of China hosted a critically acclaimed exhibition that drew over 100,000 people.

The 1990s saw major exhibitions in Taiwan at the Taipei Modern Art Museum in 1995 and the Taichung Provincial Museum in 1999.

Dong Kingman died of pancreatic cancer in his home in New York City in 2000, at age 89.

== Documentary ==
The 2011 Los Angeles Asian Pacific Film Festival featured a unique interactive presentation of James Wong Howe's 1953 Dong Kingman film documentary.

== Partial list of awards and honors ==
- San Francisco Art Association First Purchase Prize, 1936.
- Chicago Art Institute International Watercolor Exhibition Award, 1941.
- Guggenheim Fellowships, 1941 and 1942.
- Audubon Artists Medal of Honor, 1946.
- National Academy of Design, elected associate 1946. Received academy competition awards in 1963, 1971, 1975, 1977, including the 150th Anniversary Gold Medal Award.
- Philadelphia Watercolor Club competition awards, 1950 and 1968.
- American Watercolor Society competition awards, 1956, 1960, 1962, 1964, 1965, 1967, 1972, 1973, 1976, 1977, 1979, 1986, 1988, 1989, 1990, 1991, 1993, 1995 and 1997.
- American Watercolor Society Dolphin Medal Award, 1987.
- Metropolitan Museum of Art Award, 1953.
- Pennsylvania Academy of Art Award, 1953.
- U.S. Department of State International Cultural Exchange, 1954.
- Audubon Artists Award, 1958.
- San Diego Art Gallery Award, 1968
- Detroit Museum Award
- Academy of Art College San Francisco Honorary Doctorate for Human Letters, 1987.
