= Aung Soe Myint =

Burmese politician

- အောင်စိုးမြင့်

Member of the Pyithu Hluttaw
- In office 2 May 2012 – 29 January 2016
- Preceded by: Aung Min
- Succeeded by: Khin Maung Than
- Constituency: Taungoo Township

Member of the Pyithu Hluttaw
- Preceded by: Constituency established
- Succeeded by: Constituency abolished
- Constituency: Taungoo № 2
- Majority: 21,369 (68%)

Personal details
- Born: 3 August 1952 (age 74) Taungoo, Burma
- Party: National League for Democracy
- Education: Rangoon Institute of Economics
- Occupation: Politician

Aung Soe Myint (Burmese: အောင်စိုးမြင့်) is a Burmese politician and political prisoner, previously served as a Pyithu Hluttaw MP for Taungoo Township. He was elected as an Pyithu Hluttaw MP in the 1990 Burmese general election, winning a 68% majority (21,369 votes), but was never allowed to assume his seat.

Aung Soe Myint graduated from the Rangoon Institute of Economics in 1975. He became involved in politics during the 8888 Uprising, serving as a member of the Central General Strike Committee of the Taungoo District People’s Liberation Alliance.

From 31 August 2003 to 23 September 2008, he served a stint at Thayet prison, for purportedly possessing a motorcycle without a license. In fact, he had organized events for the 15th anniversary of the 8888 Uprising. He was released in September 2008, as part of a government amnesty involving the release of 9,002 prisoners.
