= Meiktila University of Economics =

Higher education institute in Mandalay Region, Myanmar

Coordinates: 20°52′0″N 96°51′0″E

- မိတ္ထီလာ စီးပွားရေးတက္ကသိုလ်
- Motto: ဝိရိယ၊ သစ္စာ၊ ဥာဏ၊ သမ္မာဓိ
- Type: Public
- Established: 2001; 25 years ago
- Affiliations: Ministry of Education
- Rector: Dr. Mya Thandar
- Faculty: Commerce, Statistics, Economics, Applied Economics, Management Studies, Myanmar, English, Mathematics, Geography
- Undergraduates: B.Econ. (Economics), (Statistics), B. Com., B.B.A., BPA, BEM
- Postgraduates: M.Econ. (Economics), (Statistics), M. Com., M.B.A., M.P.A., Ph.D.
- Location: Meiktila, Mandalay Region, Myanmar
- Website: www.mtlaeco.edu.mm

The Meiktila University of Economics (Burmese: မိတ္ထီလာ စီးပွားရေးတက္ကသိုလ်, pronounced [meiʔtʰìlà síbwájé tɛʔkəθò]), located in Meiktila, Mandalay Region, is one of three universities of economics and business in Myanmar. The university offers undergraduate and graduate degrees and diplomas, mostly in commerce, statistics and economics. It also has a small number of graduate degree programs, including a full-time MBA and MPA program as well as Ph.D. programs. Established in 2001, it celebrated its 25th anniversary in 2026.

== See also ==
- Yangon Institute of Economics
- Monywa Institute of Economics
