= Yangon University of Economics =

University in Yangon, Myanmar

Coordinates: 16°50′1″N 96°8′4″E

- ရန်ကုန် စီးပွားရေး တက္ကသိုလ်
- seal and logo
- Motto: ဝိရိယ၊ ဉာဏ၊ သစ္စာ၊ သမာဓိ (Pali: viriya, ñāṇa, saccā, samādhi)
- Motto in English: Stamina, Genius; Loyalty, Oath
- Type: Public
- Established: November 1964; 61 years ago
- Affiliations: ASEAN University Network (AUN), ASAIHL
- Rector: Dr. Tin Win
- Faculty: 243 (2007)
- Undergraduates: 5900 (2007)
- Postgraduates: 2200 (2007)
- Location: Kamayut, Yangon 11041, Yangon Region, Myanmar
- Campus: Kamayut, Hlaing, Ywathagyi
- Website: yueco.edu.mm

The Yangon University of Economics (formerly the Institute of Economics, Yangon; Burmese: ရန်ကုန် စီးပွားရေး တက္ကသိုလ် [jàɰ̃ɡòʊɰ̃ síbwájé tɛʔkəθò]) is the finest university of economics and business in Myanmar. Founded as the Section of Economics of Yangon University in 1924, the section became an independent university of higher learning in 1964. The university offers undergraduate and graduate degrees and diplomas, mostly in commerce, statistics and economics. It is also the best business school in the country, offering full-time, executive MBF, MHTM, MMM and MBA degrees.

The university serves over 1000 undergraduate and graduate students over its three Yangon area campuses: the main campus from Yangon University in Kamayut in the city and satellite campuses in Hlaing (also from Yangon University), and Ywarthargyi.

== History ==
The YUE began as Section of Economics under the Yangon University in 1924. The Section of Economics began offering commerce as a special subject in 1940, and courses in statistics in 1953. A separate Commerce Department was established in In 1955, and a separate Statistics Department in 1956. In 1964 the institute became an independent tertiary institute with three academic departments and one separate research department. In 1987, the Research Department was transformed into the Department of Management Studies and another academic department, the Department of Applied Economics, was created. The Institute now has five major academic departments and four supporting academic departments: Burmese, English, mathematics and geography.

It added a full-time MPA (2000), MDevS (2004) a full-time MBA program in 1995, an executive MBA (EMBA) program in 2002, and an online MBA program in 2007.

== Programs ==
The university confers bachelor's, master's and doctoral degrees as well as post-graduate diplomas. Regular undergraduate programs take three years and Honors undergraduate programs take four years. The master's programs take two years.

=== Overview ===
| Program | Bachelor's | Master's | Doctoral |
|---|---|---|---|
| Accounting | B.Act. | M.Act. | Ph.D. (Com.) |
| Business Administration | BBA | MBA | Ph.D. (Com.) |
| Commerce | B.Com. | M.Com, MBF | Ph.D. (Com.) |
| Development Studies | B.Dev.S. | M.Dev.S. | Ph.D. (Dev.S.) |
| Economics | B.Econ (Eco) | M.Econ (Eco) | Ph.D (Eco) |
| Population Studies | B.P.S. | M.P.S. | Ph.D. (Stats) |
| Public Administration | BPA | MPA | Ph.D. (Econ.) |
| Statistics | B.Econ. (Stats) | M.Econ. (Stats) | Ph.D. (Stats) |

=== MBA program ===
The Master of Business Administration (MBA) Program is offered in English by the Department of Management Studies. The two-year program consists of eight quarters (semesters). Three four-credit courses are offered in each quarter. To complete the MBA, the candidates must take 24 courses to obtain the required 96 credit units.

Three types of MBA are available. Day MBA, Executive MBA and online MBA.

=== Post-graduate diplomas ===
Post-graduate diplomas are one-year programs.

- Diploma in Economics Studies
- Diploma in Statistics
- Diploma in Management Administration
- Diploma in Education Management
- Diploma in Development Studies
- Diploma in Marketing
- Diploma in Research Studies

=== Certificate and diploma programs ===
The institute's Center for Human Resource Development conducts short-term training courses, certificate and diploma programs "to meet the needs of public and private sectors of the country." Higher diplomas lead to degree programs.

- Certificate in Business Studies (CBS)
- Certificate in Bookkeeping (CBK)
- Certificate in Basic Computing (CBC)
- Certificate in Business Information Studies (CBIS)
- Certificate in Advanced Business Studies (CABS)
- Certificate in Advanced Accounting (CAA)
- Certificate in Computerized Accounting (CAA)
- Diploma in Business Studies (DBS)
- Diploma in Financial Accounting (DFac)
- Diploma in Management Accounting (DMac)
- Diploma in Business Accounting (DBac)
- Diploma in Development Studies
- Diploma in Secretarial Management (DSM) (in collaboration with LCCI EB of British Council)
- Higher Diploma in Business Studies (HDBS)
- Higher Diploma in Accounting Studies (HDAS)

== International co-operation and collaboration ==
The YIE is member of ASEAN University Network (AUN). The institute is also affiliated with Osaka Sanjo University of Japan, Yunnan University of Finance and Economics (YUFE) of China, Management Development Institute of Singapore (MDIS), University of Utara Malaysia (UUM) and University of Kaiserslautern of Germany.

== Notable alumni ==
- Ronald Findlay
- Aung Soe Myint
- Aung Thet Mann
- Aung Tun Thet
- Htin Kyaw
- Kan Zaw
- Khin San Yee
- Ma Thanegi
- Swe Zin Htaik
- U Myint
- Winston Set Aung
- Hla Myint
- Mauk Kham Wah
- Tun Thura Thet

== See also ==
- Monywa Institute of Economics
- Meiktila Institute of Economics
