= Aung Khin =

Burmese painter

- အောင်ခင်
- Self Portrait, 1960
- Born: 13 February 1921; Monywa District, British Burma
- Died: 13 April 1996 (aged 75); Mandalay, Myanmar
- Education: Apprentice to Ba Nyan
- Known for: Painting
- Movement: Mandalay School, Impressionism, Expressionism, Cubism, Non-Figurative Abstract Painting
- Awards: First Prize, All Burma Competition (1952, USIS Sponsored)

Aung Khin (Burmese: အောင်ခင် [ʔàʊɰ̃ kʰɪ̀ɰ̃], 13 February 1921 – 14 May 1996) was a Burmese painter who became prominent in the Mandalay art world. He is well known as one of the foremost and earliest of modernistic painters in Burma.

== Training, memberships, and associations ==
Aung Khin was born on 13 February 1921 in Nat Kyun Aung Myay village, Hsalingyi township, Monywa district, the youngest of seven children. His uncle and brothers ran a mixed art workshop, where he studied from the age of twelve. When he was sixteen, he moved to Yangon to study for five years as an apprentice under the London-trained Ba Nyan, whose works were primarily in a naturalistic and realistic vein.

In 1947 Aung Khin moved to Mandalay where he married Tin Tin Aye. He became active in the Mandalay Artist's Association, and eventually became Secretary and President of the association. In Mandalay, he became an associate of Kin Maung (Bank)., a well-known Mandalay artist who proselytized heavily for a modernistic movement in painting in Burma through sponsoring workshops and writing papers.

In 1978 he and his daughter Cho Cho Aung, also a painter, set up the Panthu Sanda Children's Art Centre. In 1981 he was elected vice president of the Traditional Art Association, and in 1994 he was made patron of the Mandalay Artists Association. In 1996 he started the Yellow Art Gallery in Mandalay, named after Frank Spenlove-Spenlove's Yellow Door School in London where Ba Nyan had studied. The Yellow Art Gallery is today run by his daughter Cho Cho Aung.

== Early recognition ==
In 1952 Aung Khin won first prize for an oil painting in a USIS-sponsored All Burma Competition, and in 1960-61 he had several one-man shows in Mandalay and Yangon, one of which was sponsored by the Burma-America Institute.

== Oeuvre ==
Aung Khin's work largely reflected the European influence of the colonial-era Burmese artists. This included impressionism, what has been described as a conceptual expressionism and other forms of abstract painting, including cubism. However, he attempted to develop a uniquely Burmese style in his work, often rendering figures in his expressionist paintings with bold outlines and strong color contrast showing influence of the ancient mural painting of Bagan.

One of his more intriguing explorations was using abstract non-figurative painting as a means to express Buddhist concepts beyond the earthly (difficultly-visualized) realm, or one might say life after death in Brahmaloka and Devaloka, asking "How shall I draw the abode of Man and Deva?"

His wife died in June 1994. After his wife died, perhaps realizing that his days left were numbered, he became extremely prolific, painting night and day. When he died, he left in the vicinity of 100 unsold paintings in his home in the care of his daughter Cho Cho Aung. His Buddhist paintings were among these last works. Aung Khin died on 14 May 1996.

== Museum collections ==
- Singapore Art Museum

== See also ==
- Ba Nyan
- Kin Maung (Bank)
- Paw Oo Thet

== Bibliography ==
- Ranard, Andrew (2009). "The Modernist Movement: The Outsiders". Burmese Painting : A Linear and Lateral History. Silkworm Books. pp. 254–263. ISBN 978-974-9511-76-3.
- Aung Khin (1998). Reminiscences of Myanmar Art. Translated by Than Tun. Cape.
- Amar, Ludu Daw (1997). Modern Burmese Painting (in Burmese). Yarbye Press and Kyibwa Press.
