= Myanmar Development Resource Institute =

Myanmar-based think tank

- မြန်မာ့ဖွံ့ဖြိုး တိုးတက်ရေး အရင်းအမြစ် အဖွဲ့အစည်း
- Abbreviation: MDRI
- Formation: 2012
- Type: Policy think tank
- Headquarters: Hlaing Township
- Location: Yangon, Myanmar
- Subsidiaries: Centre for Economic and Social Development (CESD), Centre for Strategic and International Studies (CSIS) and the Centre for Legal Affairs

The Myanmar Development Resource Institute (Burmese: မြန်မာ့ဖွံ့ဖြိုး တိုးတက်ရေး အရင်းအမြစ် အဖွဲ့အစည်း, abbreviated MDRI) is an independent think tank and economic and social policy research organisation based in Yangon, Myanmar. MDRI consists of three specialised centres, namely the Centre for Economic and Social Development (CESD), Centre for Strategic and International Studies (CSIS) and the Centre for Legal Affairs.

MRDI was initially proposed by Burmese economist U Myint in May 2011, in a paper entitled "Reducing Poverty in Myanmar: The Way Forward". The institute was then founded the following year, by U Myint and other advisors to President Thein Sein.
