= David Tame =

British author (born 1953)

David Tame (born 1953) is a British author who writes about music and spirituality. Tame earned his Bachelor of Science in Psychology from the University of East London and a Post-Graduate Diploma in Religious Education from Warwick University. Tame was a co-founder in 1981 of The Summit Lighthouse (UK), which is a national religious charity for England and Wales and is a national branch of the Summit Lighthouse headquartered in the United States. Van Morrison recommended Tame's 1984 book The Secret Power of Music as a sourcebook for those interested in the spiritual side of music.

== Works ==
=== Books ===
- The Secret Power of Music: The Transformation of Self and Society through Musical Energy 1984. Rochester, VT: Destiny Books. ISBN 0-85500-196-8.
  - Translated into German as Die geheime Macht der Musik: die Transformation des Selbst und der Gesellschaft durch musikalische Energie 1984. Zürich, Switzerland: Pan verlag. ISBN 3-907073-38-X
  - Translated into Portuguese as O Poder Oculto Da Musica: A transformação do homem pela energia da música. 1984. Sao Paulo, Brazil: Editora Cultrix. ISBN 9788531603020
- Beethoven and the Spiritual Path 1994. Wheaton, IL: Quest Books. ISBN 0-8356-0701-1.
- Real Fairies: True Accounts of Meetings with Nature Spirits 1999. Milverton, UK: Capall Bann Publishing. ISBN 186163-0719.
- Van Morrison: The 1987 Interviews with David Tame 2013. e-book.

=== Articles ===
- "Conspiracy Theory BC: The Forbidden Mysteries of Enoch" Critique #19/20 (Fall/Winter, 1986)
- "Orthodox Christology as a Mechanism of Control" Critique #23/24 (Fall/Winter, 1986/87)
- "Secret Societies in the Life of Karl Marx" Critique #25 (1987) and #27 (1988)
- "Evil and the Imagery of Anti-life in Rock Music" Critique #28 (1988)
- "Sex and Celibacy in Healing and Spirituality" Critique #29 (1988-9)
