= Organisation for Economic Co-operation and Development controversy =

Controversies of the OECD

Some decisions, actions or reports made at or by the Organisation for Economic Co-operation and Development (OECD) have raised controversy.

== OECD and soft law ==
Unlike many other inter-governmental organizations like the United Nations or the European Commission, the OECD cannot legislate or enforce laws and lacks the power to coerce a country, member or not, to alter its policy.

However, it can have an influence on national policies through soft laws, by issuing "recommendations", "guidelines" and other "manuals", to which countries or companies can refer. Some of these guidelines have become de facto standards, such as the OECD Guidelines for the Testing of Chemicals or the OECD Model Tax Convention.

Also, negotiations and agreements between representatives of member countries can occur at the OECD and have direct consequences in national laws.

== OECD and taxation ==
=== Tax havens ===
The OECD and its Financial Action Task Force regularly publish the list of uncooperative tax havens.

The FATF blacklist was the common shorthand description for the Financial Action Task Force list of "Non-Cooperative Countries or Territories" (NCCTs). The effect of the FATF Blacklist has been significant and arguably has been more important in international efforts against money laundering than has the FATF Recommendations. While under international law, the FATF Blacklist carries with it no formal sanction, in reality, a jurisdiction placed on the FATF Blacklist often finds itself under intense financial pressure. As a result of the FATF 40+8 Recommendations (among other initiatives), most countries now require their banks to report certain suspicious financial activities to the appropriate financial regulators and law enforcement authorities. (In the United States, they are called Suspicious Activity Reports.)

Most larger countries with significant financial centres consider transactions coming from or transferring to a jurisdiction on the FATF Blacklist to be a suspicious activity, which automatically triggers closer regulatory scrutiny (and considerably more paperwork on the bank's part). Thus, many major financial institutions will not conduct business with counterparts based in Non-Cooperative Countries and Territories (NCCTs).

Since many of the countries that FATF originally listed as NCCTs have major financial industries (Bahamas, Cayman Islands, Liechtenstein), such de facto boycotts could have a significant effect on a country's economy (or at least a politically powerful sector of the economy).

=== Pro-tax lobbying ===
Some observers, such as the American conservative FreedomWorks foundation, argue that the OECD is lobbying for more taxes. In book series such as its Economic Survey of countries, OECD analysts advise countries on their policies including tax. Such groups also remark that the OECD is funded by tax money.

== Multi-lateral Agreement on Investment ==
The Multilateral Agreement on Investment was negotiated at the OECD between 1995 and 1998. While the discussion was not secret, it had little public awareness until a draft report was leaked in 1997. That had led to massive outcry and an intensive campaign against it. Eventually, countries gave in and cancelled the agreement.
