= Ma Thanegi =

Burmese writer (born 1946)

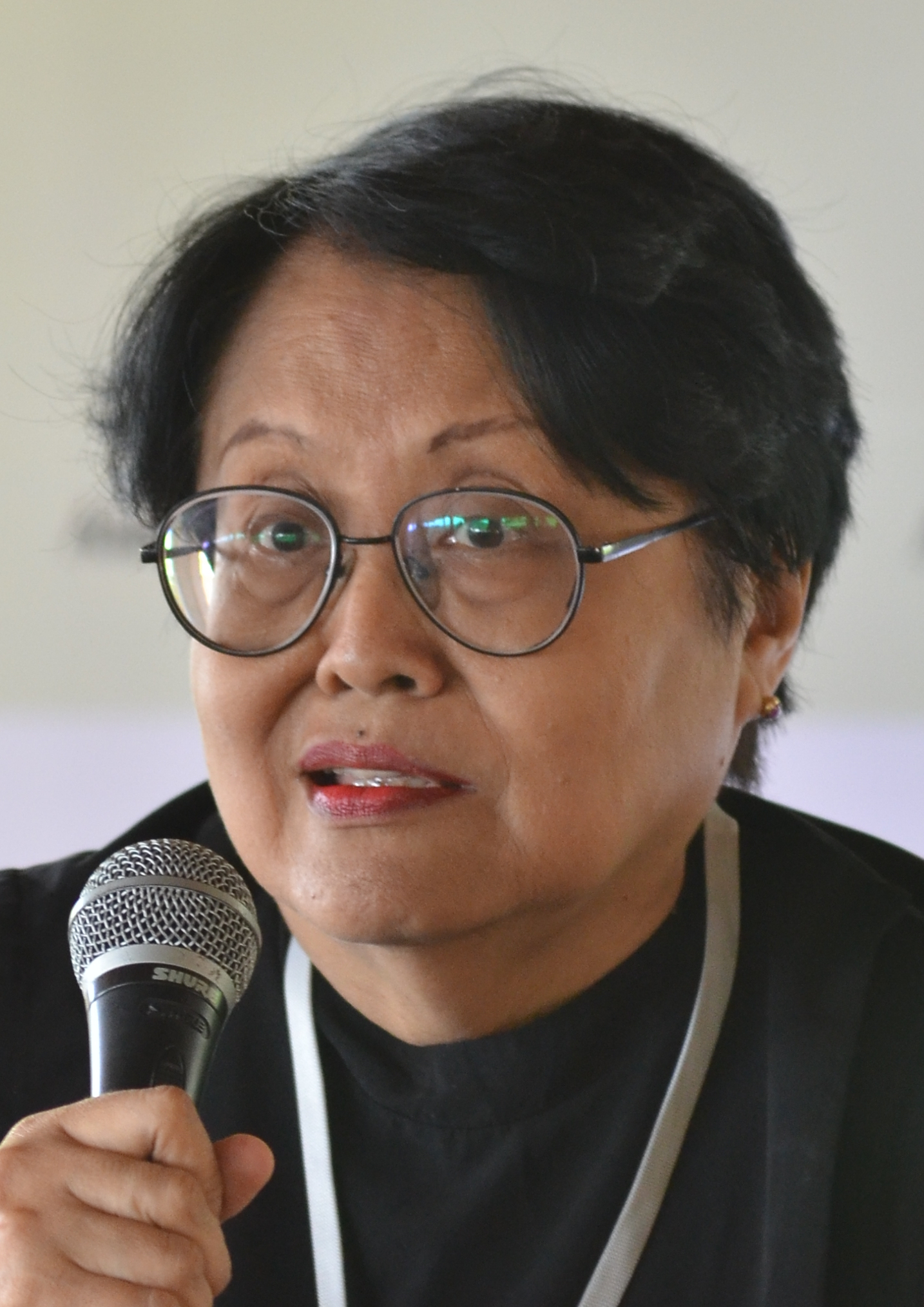
- Ma Thanegi, in 2012
- Born: 1946 (age 79–80); Burma
- Other name: Wyn Tin Tut
- Occupations: Author, painter

Ma Thanegi (Burmese: မသိင်္ဂီ; born 1946) is a Burmese writer, best known for her numerous English works on various Burmese topics, including travel, history and cuisine. She was a contributing editor to the Myanmar Times and editor of Enchanting Myanmar, a travel magazine. She was born to father Tin Tut and mother May Tin Tut. and has one older brother Aye Tut. She attended the prestigious Methodist English High School of Yangon (Rangoon). She was a painter in the early part of her life with many annual group shows (1967 onwards) and seven solo shows (1985 to 1998) after which she began her writing career. She has also translated some Burmese writings of others into English such as works of Khin Hnin Yu and Daw Ma Ma lay etc.

Thanegi attended Methodist English High School, the Rangoon State School of Fine Arts, the Rangoon Institute of Economics, and Institute of Foreign Languages, where she studied German and French.

Thanegi served as Aung San Suu Kyi's personal assistant before her arrest in 1989, following the 8888 Uprising. She served a prison term at Insein Jail until her release in 1992. She fell out of favor among the Burmese pro-democracy movement for her challenge to the National League for Democracy's doctrine that economic sanctions and tourism boycotts were harming the country's poor majority. In 1997, she published "The Burmese Fairy Tale," an essay in the Far Eastern Economic Review, claiming that sanctions hurt the Burmese people without effectively changing the Burmese regime (then known as the State Law and Order Restoration Council)'s behavior.

== Selected works ==
- The Illusion of Life: Burmese Marionettes (1994)
- The Native Tourist: in search of turtle eggs (2000)
- Myanmar Pilgereise (2002)
- The Native Tourist: a holiday pilgrimage in Myanmar (2004)
- Paw Oo Thett: His Life and Creativity (2004)
- An Introduction to Myanmar Cuisine (2004)
- Inle Lake: blue sea in the Shan Hills (2005)
- Splendours of Myanmar (2005)
- Myanmar Architecture: Cities of Gold (2005)
- Myanmar Painting: from worship to self imaging (2006)
- Shwedagon Mystique (2007)
- Inside the Southeast Asian Kitchen (2007)
- Material Choices (2007)
- Burma/ Myanmar (2008)
- Birmanie: voyage intérieur (2008)
- To Myanmar with Love (2009)
- I am Cadmium Red: The Story of Paw Thame (2010)
- Defiled on the Ayeyarwaddy: One Woman’s Mid-Life Travel Adventures on Myanmar’s Great River (2010)
- This is Kin Maung Yin (2010)
- Thanakha: Nature's Gift to Myanmar (2011)
- Naga: A Celebration of Identity (2011)
- Nats: Spirits of Fortune and Fear (2011)
- Bagan Mystique (2012)
- Nor Iron Bars a Cage (2013)
- Ginger Salad and Water Wafers (2013)
- Bagan Lacquerware (2013)
