= Myanmar Press Council =

Media adjudication body in Myanmar

The Myanmar Press Council (Burmese: မြန်မာသတင်းမီဒီယာကောင်စီ; abbreviated MPC; formerly the Myanmar Core Press Council) is a media adjudication body which investigates and settles press disputes, compiles journalism ethics, and protects media personnel in Burma's media landscape. It was initially conceived as a Ministry of Information-appointed body consisting of 20 members led by Chairman Khin Maung Lay, a retired Supreme Court judge, to regulate media affairs following the abolishment of pre-publication censorship. In response to local media criticism, it was reformed as an independent body involving privately owned media representatives.

== See also ==
- Censorship in Burma
- Media of Burma
