= Win Pe =

Burmese artist

- ဝင်းဖေ
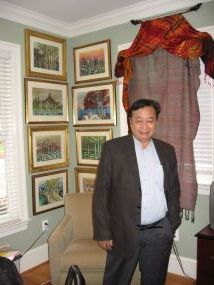
- Born: 1935 (age 90–91); Mandalay, British Burma
- Education: Studied with Ba Thet and Kin Maung (Bank)
- Known for: Painting, Film Director, Short Story Writer
- Movement: Modernism

Win Pe (Burmese: ဝင်းဖေ; born 16 June 1935) is one of Myanmar’s most celebrated living artists. Along with his close friends Kin Maung Yin and Paw Oo Thett, Win Pe was a leader of Myanmar’s modern art movement in the 1960s. In the 1970s and 1980s, he was a successful film director, winning Myanmar’s equivalent of the Academy Award in 1981. He is also a respected short story writer.

== Early Training ==
Win Pe is from Mandalay, the historical and cultural capital of Myanmar and from a prominent Mandalay family. His father, Shwepy U Ba Tin, a famous scholar of Myanmar art, history and culture, was very supportive of Win Pe’s artistic development. While his father was an anti-colonialist and preferred traditional Myanmar music, he was open to his son’s discovery of American Jazz and European classical music which he heard from Radio Ceylon and American movies and sent him to apprentice with the successful painter, Ba Thet. His friend Paw Oo Thett joined him there and after a while Ba Thet sent both of them to study with Kin Maung (Bank) to learn modernist, more abstract art trends. Later, both would take Norman Rockwell’s correspondence course, the Famous Artist School. The work of one of the School’s instructors, Dong Kingman, the Chinese-American watercolorist, was a great influence on Win Pe.

== Career ==
In the early 1960s, Win Pe and Paw Oo Thett left Mandalay for Rangoon where they met Kin Maung Yin, an artist and architect. The three lived together at the architect offices, exchanged ideas, painted together and held many exhibitions especially among the diplomatic community.

In 1966, Win Pe, at age 31, was appointed Dean of the Mandalay State School of Fine Art, Music and Dance. It was his dream job but his vision to mix modern ideas with traditional arts conflicted with the older, conservative teaching staff and he left after four years. He would spend the next 15 years as a film director and short story writer. His first film, Let the Sky Not Fall was well received and in 1981 he won Myanmar’s equivalent of the Academy Awards as Best Director for his film, Red Rose Dream.

In 1993, three of Win Pe’s short stories were published in the book, Inked Over, Ripped Out. The following year, he attended the International Writing Program at the University of Iowa and earned an Honorary Fellowship there.
