= Kin Maung Yin =

Burmese painter (1938–2014)

- ခင်မောင်ရင်
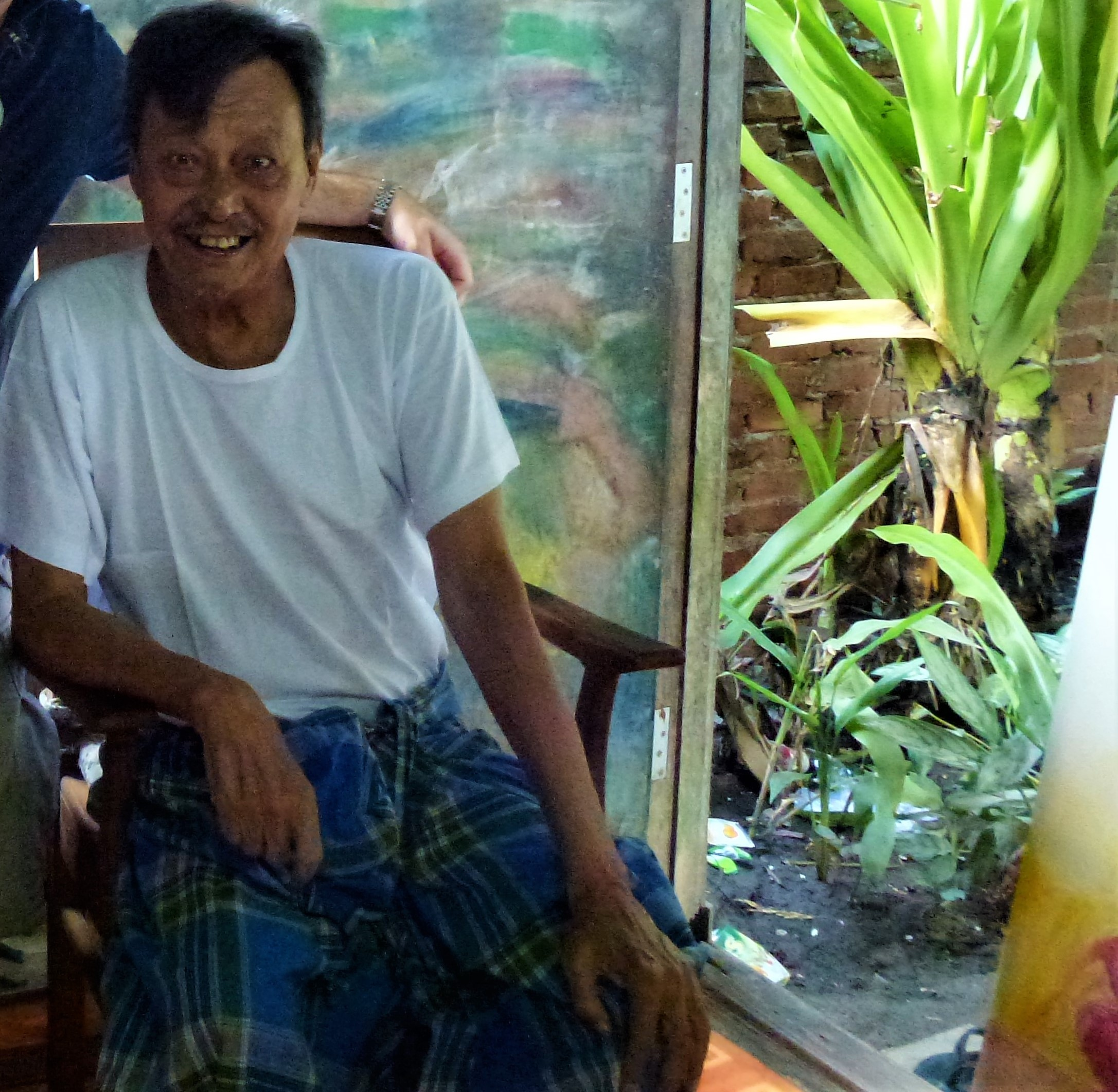
- Born: Henry Sewell; 8 November 1938; Thayagone Village, Pegu
- Died: 10 June 2014 (aged 75); Pinlone Hospital, Yangon
- Resting place: Yayway Cemetery, Yangon

Kin Maung Yin (Burmese: ခင်မောင်ရင်, 1938–2014) was an influential Burmese artist who was recognized as one of the leaders in the first generation of Burma's modern art movement together with Win Pe and Paw Oo Thet. Kin Maung Yin was the leader of this group which in addition to Win Pe and Paw Oo Thett soon included Baji Aung Soe, Nan Waii, Shwe Oung Thame. He died at Yangon on 10 June 2014 at the age of 76.

KMY, as he was sometimes known, was born Frank Sewell. His father was a Scot in the British Army who married a local and lived in the village shunned by other British but he was happy. KMY was the oldest of 10 children

He studied architecture at University of Yangon. He joined the team for 18 months in construction of Kamalapur Railway Station, Dhaka after he graduated. It was his first and the last salary-man job. He was in film business before started painting in 1960s. He was known not only for his paintings but also for his monk-like devotion to art alone and a proclivity for a hermetic life of solitude. He was inspired by Dutch modernist Piet Mondrian during his school days but later some of his works including the portrait of Aung San Suu Kyi were inspired by Italian modernist Amedeo Modigliani. He also wrote several books. One of his well-known books is Koob One. Some others were Art Language, Art Standards (co-author Zaw Zaw Aung), Paw Oo Thet’s Visit, and Kin Maung Yin 72. His biography, This is Khin Maung Yin, by Ma Theingi was published in late 2010.
