= The Thames (steamship) =

British steamship lost in 1877

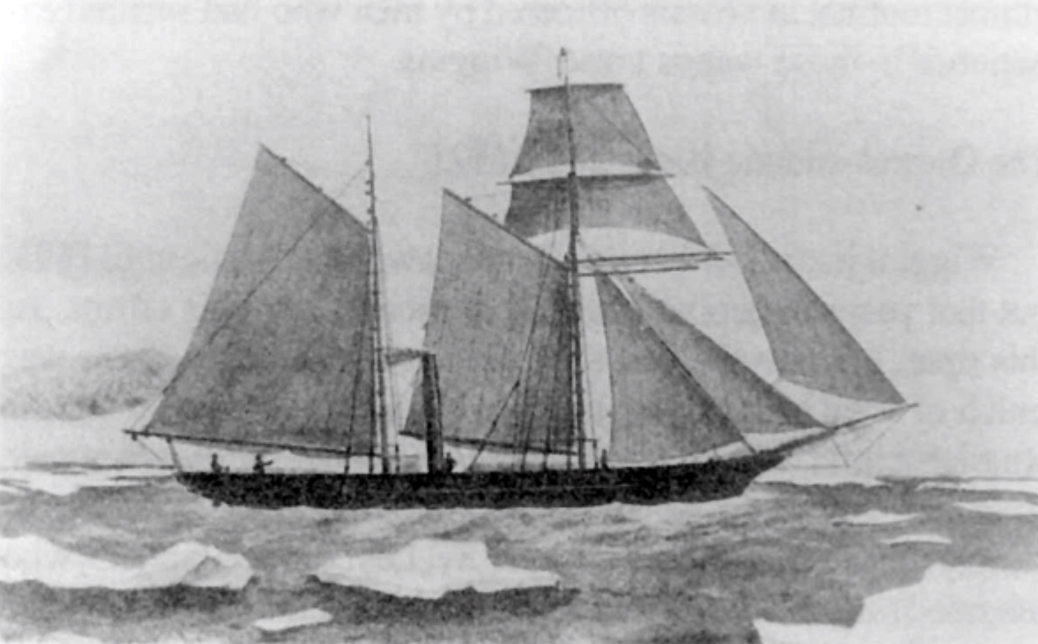
- The Thames

History
- Name: The Thames
- Fate: Ran aground on 3 July 1877

General characteristics
- Type: Screw steamer
- Tonnage: 120 tons

The Thames was a British steamship lost in 1877 while exploring the western part of the Northeast Passage (the sea route east from Europe to northern Russia and East Asia which runs north of Siberia).

With financial backing from Charles Gardiner, Joseph Wiggins – an experienced sea captain who had already twice sailed to the north of Russia, once entering the Kara Sea – purchased The Thames, a 120-ton (Note: or 120 tonnes, according to The Guardian; a "tonne" is 2,204 pounds (1,000 kg) while "ton" usually means either short ton (2,000 pounds (910 kg)) or long ton 2,240 pounds (1,020 kg)); but the terms are used loosely and interchangeably at different times and in different localities and are frequently confused.) screw steamer, with the intent of surveying the Gulf of Ob and the Yenisei River and returning with profitable cargo.

The Thames left Vardø in Norway on 26 July 1876. The ship entered the Yenisei River and reached the Kureika River on 18 October, too late to return home, so Wiggins secured the ship for the winter and traveled overland back to Britain. The Thames and its crew wintered 1876–1877 on the Yenisei, and Wiggins returned to her at the end of April 1877. But she was frozen to the bottom and suffered damage on being freed; headed downriver, she then ran aground on 3 July 1877. Despite the crew's effort, the ship could not be saved, and she was sold for scrap (her main value being her boilers). The crew refused Wiggins's proffered schooner as unsafe and returned with him to Yeniseysk and thence home overland.

In 2016, the wreck of The Thames was found in the Yenisei River (Note: Near the village of Goroshikha 66°23′13.3″N 87°31′47.9″E, according to The Guardian. About 30 miles (48 km) south of that, near Turukhansk 65°47′45.4″N 87°58′06.0″E, according to the Siberian Times.) by Nikolay Karelin and Alexander Goncharov, researchers from Siberian State Aerospace University sponsored by the Russian Geographical Society and the Russian Fund for the Humanities.
