= Paw Oo Thet =

Burmese painter (1936–1993)

- ပေါ်ဦးသက်
- Paw Oo Thet
- Born: Paw Oo; 1936; Mandalay, British Burma
- Died: 13 April 1993 (aged 57); Mandalay, Myanmar
- Education: Apprentice to Ba Thet, Famous Artists School (Correspondence Course, USA)
- Known for: Painting
- Movement: Mandalay School

Paw Oo Thet (Burmese: ပေါ်ဦးသက်, pronounced [pɔ̀ ʔú θɛʔ]; 1936 – 13 April 1993) was a Burmese painter, prominent in the Mandalay art scene who became one of the initiators of a modernistic art movement in Burma in the early 1960s.

== Early training ==
Paw Oo Thet was born in 1936 in Mandalay, son of an artist who taught art in a public school. He lost his mother when he was young, and was brought up by his father, who taught him to draw and paint. At the age of twelve, shortly after the end of World War II, he lost his right hand while playing with a hand grenade and was forced to learn to write and draw with his left hand. As a school student, he won many prizes in art competitions and participated in some exhibitions, but he did not acquire an education beyond high school. He and Win Pe, both born in the same year, studied under Ba Thet, who sent the two young artists to Kin Maung (Bank) (c. 1908−83) to learn about modernistic, more abstract art trends. Both Paw Oo Thet and Win Pe embraced such trends. He and Win Pe would leave Mandalay for Rangoon in the early 1960s where they teamed up with Kin Maung Yin, the leader of the group, in the pursuit of Modernist ideas and held many exhibitions among the diplomatic community.

== Early professional career ==
By the age of twenty-one, Paw Oo Thet was earning enough to make a living from his art as an illustrator and cartoonist in local magazines and newspapers, including the People's Daily in Mandalay, The Mirror, and the Working People’s Daily in Yangon. He won a scholarship in 1959 that let him and Win Pe undertake Norman Rockwell's correspondence course, the Famous Artists School, in the United States. The exposure to the work of Dong Kingman, the Chinese-American watercolorist, often described as an impressionist and who was one of the instructors of the Famous Artists School, influenced both Paw Oo Thet and Win Pe in a large way. In the case of Paw Oo Thet, Kingman's influence carried over in Paw Oo Thet's vibrant use of color, which was a refreshing change in Burmese arts for much Burmese painting until then was characterized by somber and subdued coloring, and in oil painting, heavy and dark use of chiaroscuro, acquired from the style of Ba Nyan.

== His oeuvre ==
Paw Oo Thet's oeuvre possesses four or five genres, or styles. First, there were his light-hearted strip cartoons which he published in magazines; in fact, he became the founder of a popular comic strip, Gali, published in Mandalay. Comic-strip painting was not new to Burma, and Ba Gyan (1902–1953), had earlier won the highest award in Burma for artistic accomplishment, the Alinga Kyaw Zwa, for his cartoon work, poking fun at the pompous and vulnerable side of human nature and sometimes political in nature. This history and taste for cartoon gave artists in Burma the inspiration to explore cartoon art as a serious form of expression.

Paw Oo Thet's second genre was his free-standing watercolor paintings, sold to private collectors, to be framed and hung in homes or offies. These paintings borrowed much from Dong Kingman with their bold vibrant colors, but not often of Kingman's fluid composition. Many of these paintings were done in a geometric format, semi-cubist in style, and it seems that Paw Oo Thet's largest inspiration here came from his training in modernistic painting and design from Kin Maung (Bank). The paintings were often of market or village scenes or squeezed arrangements of temples, the last typical of some of Kin Maung's oil work. Paw Oo Thet's taste for cartoon passed over into this work also, as one of the singular marks in these watercolor paintings are the wide, exaggerated comic grins on the faces of figures. These cheerful paintings had many fans among Burmese, and they sold at a price which could be afforded by middle-class Burmese. These may be called Paw Oo Thet's commercial work, his bread and butter. It is said of these paintings that his nephew, the tapestry artist Sein Myint, would copy Paw Oo Thet's paintings, and sometimes Sein Myint completed the copy before the original was done.

Paw Oo Thet himself differentiated between his commercial work, often executed tortuously and tediously, and his serious painting, inspired by deeper creative impulses, which flowed freely and unconsciously. He regarded himself as an expressionist painter. And it is in this third genre that his most serious work was done, usually in oil. But it is very difficult to describe this work with an ism, for once the inspiration began, the outcome of the painting was fairly unpredictable. In this genre, he did family and group portraits, self-portraits, landscapes, work inspired by Burmese traditions or Bagan mural painting, one entirely non-figurative abstract painting, as well as other work. Some of his outstanding paintings in this genre are Three Blind Men (date unknown and documented only in a black and white photo), Self-Portrait in Robes (1967), Soldier Playing Guitar (1976), Royal Game Hunt (1974), Buddha and the Five Disciples (1971), Family (1979) (with much influence of Henry Moore and done in several versions), Portrait of his Father U Hla Gyi (1967), Marionette Duo (1974) and Expecting Mother (1974) (of his wife). All of these works can be found in Ma Thanegi's Paw Oo Thett (1936–1993), His Life and His Creativity and some of them in Andrew Ranard's Burmese Painting: A Linear and Lateral History.

A last genre of Paw Oo Thet are the works he did on commission to illustrate stories in magazines, book covers, and texts of books such as The Orange-Robed Boy, written in English by Patricia Wallace Garlan and Marjarene Dunstan (1967). In this book, 21 of his watercolor illustrations lavished the text. His commissioned work for books such as this or for the writings of other authors, oddly, seem to be some of his most imaginatively inspired watercolor. In The Orange-Robed Boy, Kingman's influence of a free and open composition sometimes appeared, but if the text was in Burmese and the theme he was illustrating was of a strong traditional bent, he might reach back to the techniques of Traditional painting to do the works.

== Milestones ==
Paw Oo Thet's acquired a large reputation in Burma when his first one-man show, sponsored by the Burma-America Institute, an arm of the USIS, opened in Rangoon on November 22, 1963, the day of John F. Kennedy's assassination, and all the paintings sold out. It is often said that this show kicked off the 1960s modernistic movement in Burma. However, Aung Khin (1921–1996), the Mandalay painter, had exhibited modernistic paintings more than a decade earlier, but Aung Khin's work did not catch fire or initiate a movement.

Later, Paw Oo Thet painted watercolors to raise money for a UNICEF funding campaign, The images for the paintings, Asian Harbor Scene (1974) and Market (1975), were used for diaries, stamps and greeting cards. His illustrations were also used for a literacy campaign, supported by the United Nations and the Burmese Government, and for several educational books.

== Overview ==
It is said that Paw Oo Thet became well known amongst connoisseurs for his blend of Myanmar traditions with modern Western techniques and that he successfully revived the traditional Burmese style in a modern manner. This characterization of Paw Oo Thet makes his work sound much like Ba Kyi's. However, while Ba Kyi (1912–2000) and Paw Oo Thet both dealt with traditional themes of Burmese culture, their paths were quite different. Ba Kyi had little interest in abstract, modernistic forms. Ba Kyi was interested in initiating a Neo-Traditional revival of Burmese painting, through introducing basic techniques of Western painting to Traditional painting to enliven the genre. Paw Oo Thet, on the other hand, like his early teacher Kin Maung (Bank), had a strong interest in modernistic forms of painting and had a close eye on these trends in the outside world. He wanted to introduce expressionism, cubism and other more abstract forms of painting to Burma and to use these forms to express the national culture. There are, however, cases of overlap where Paw Oo Thet's painting might resemble Ba Kyi's or even that of Aung Soe (1924–90) who pushed modernistic painting forward in Burma in a far more pioneering and aggressive fashion. The overlap in these three painter's works occurs when they are doing paintings meant to capture the more ancient moods of Burmese culture and are heavily borrowing techniques from Traditional painting.

One commentator has said that Paw Oo Thet's figurative illustrations of local legends and genre scenes were close to the hearts of the masses. According to Sonny Nyein, a publisher and part-time sculptor who is close to the art community in Burma, "His [Paw Oo Thet's] paintings reflect the mood of the people". Ma Thanegi wrote of Paw Oo Thet, referring to his more commercial work, "He was most known for his colourful and elegantly done water-colours of Myanmar scenes which viewers and collectors from all over the world treasured, but he never felt satisfied that it was truly art born out of his feelings. He may never have realized that in spite of being just 'pretty pictures' as he called them, they gave a true sene of the lives of the people."

== Death ==
Paw Oo Thet was a heavy smoker and died at the age of 57 from lung cancer. His funeral was attended by a great many artists of his period, who compiled a short work of collected poems for the occasion. He was a well-loved artist with a disarming sense of humor and the stumbling, sometimes penetrating, vision of a self-educated individual. Later, his letters to his wife, written to her in Mandalay while he was living in Rangoon and struggling to make a living there, were collected and published along with essays he had published in magazines, interviews others had conducted with him, and eulogies about him written by other painters.

== Museum and library collections ==
- National Museum of Myanmar
- Fukuoka Asian Art Museum
- (Yangon) Universities Central Library

== See also ==
- Ba Thet
- Kin Maung (Bank)
- Ba Nyan
- Aung Khin
- Aung Soe
- Ba Kyi

== Bibliography ==
- Amar, Ludu Daw (1997). Modern Burmese Painting (in Burmese). Yarbye Press and Kyibwa Press.
- Paw Oo Thet--POT (1994) (In Burmese). Yangon: Maung Ye Myint, Tet Lann Sar Pae. [An anthology of Paw Oo Thet's writings, interviews with him, and eulogies written about him after his death.]
- Ranard, Andrew (2009). "The Modernist Movement: The Mandalay Resurgence". Burmese Painting : A Linear and Lateral History. Silkworm Books. pp. 227–237. ISBN 978-974-9511-76-3.
- Thanegi, Ma (2004). Paw Oo Thett, 1936-1993: his life and his creativity. Yangon: Swiftwinds Services. [A short biography of Paw Oo Thett which includes over 130 illustrations of his oils, watercolors and pencil drawings, samples of his cartoons, and translated portions of Paw Oo Thet--POT (1994)].
