= Aung Soe =

Burmese painter (1924–1990)

Bagyi Aung Soe
- ဗဂျီ အောင်စိုး
- Born: 1924; Rangoon, British Burma
- Died: 1990 (aged 65–66); Yangon, Myanmar
- Known for: Painting
- Movement: Modernist (abstract-figurative)Painting

Bagyi Aung Soe (Burmese: ဗဂျီ အောင်စိုး [bədʑì ʔàʊɰ̃ só]; 1924–1990) was a Burmese painter renowned for his modernistic, semi-abstract art, which caused such a shock in Burma when it appeared that many called it "psychopathic art". The name "Bagyi" is his phonetic spelling of the word "pangyi", meaning "painting", which he first added to his name in 1955.

== Santiniketan and Early Life in Burma ==
The Indian government offered him a scholarship in 1951 to study art at Santiniketan, founded by Nobel laureate Rabindranath Tagore, but he chose to return to Burma after only a year. He traveled throughout Burma, studying its handicrafts, classical art and architecture, especially that of Bagan. In early 1953, one of Aung Soe's abstract paintings was published in Shumawa magazine, causing considerable controversy. Some said that the artist was mad.

== Trip to Peshawar, Afghanistan and Russia ==
In the winter of 1953 he was able to visit Peshawar, Afghanistan and Moscow for art studies. It has been alleged that in Russia, he saw the works of modern European masters such as Picasso, Matisse and Kandinsky, but this can hardly be true because the work of the modern European masters was in deep storage in Russia and unavailable to the public view during the Stalinist period and for many years afterwards. However, it is clear that Aung Soe was influenced by European painters such as Picasso and Matisse, probably Japanese painting (one work shows the influence of Sumi-e), and the work of painters at Santiniketan, both contemporary and deceased, whose works were in the Santiniketan Museum. During his time at Santiniketan, Aung Soe met the Indonesian expressionist painter Affandi, who also influenced him. In addition to these foreign influences, Aung Soe was deeply influenced by the long history of Burmese Traditional painting, stretching back to the time of Bagan, which can still be seen on the walls of temples of the old city there.

== Later life in Burma ==
After this, he had to depend on the Rangoon University Library for art books as a source of inspiration. An eccentric, at times drunken and emotional, he had few friends in the artistic community and few who shared his views on art. He worked alone, but did show his work in informal underground exhibitions, introducing concepts such as Cubism and Surrealism.

To earn money, Bagyi Aung Soe painted for magazines and book covers until the end of his career. At times his family was so poor that his wife had to sell mohinga, a noodle soup, to support them. Bagyi Aung Soe suffered poverty and isolation and never found success during his life. He died in 1990, going deaf and blind.

== Work ==
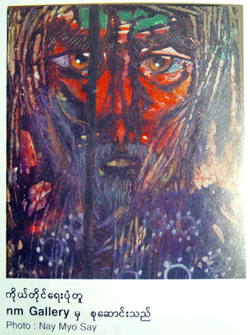
Titled "Self Portrait" by Aung Soe

Aung Soe thought deeply about the relevance of art in 20th-century Burma. According to Yin Ker, "He aspired for his paintings to be visual translations of Buddhist truths, not mere illustrations of episodes from the Buddha's previous lives or pretty pictures of pagodas and monks". In his later years, in poverty and with failing health, he became increasingly obsessed with creating an artistic idiom that reflected the Buddhist laws of impermanence. His biographer has said, "he transposed his spiritual aspirations and experiences into his artistic mission statement and applied their practical methods to the act of creation".

Though Aung Soe's talent was unrecognized during his life, he is now among the most admired and most famous of Burmese modern artists. Less than ten years after his death, his paintings fetched thousands of dollars in Indonesian art galleries. The organizer of a 2009 exhibition in his honour said, "Almost two decades after his death, his art continues to fascinate and stimulate".

Aung Soe was a seminal figure for modern Burmese art through the 20th century, with his unique vision and skill showcasing the interconnectedness of all things inspiring artist towards modernist movements in Myanmar.

== See also ==
- Santiniketan
- Nandalal Bose
- Affandi
