= M.T. Hla =

Burmese painter and watercolorist

M.T. Hla (U Tun Hla)
- Born: 1874
- Died: 1946 (aged 71–72)
- Known for: Painting
- Movement: Western-Style Painting

M.T. Hla (U Tun Hla, Burmese: ထွန်းလှ) (1874–1946) was an early pioneer watercolor and oil painter of Burma who painted in the Western style. M.T. Hla was the signature he used for signing his paintings, which was apparently derived from the initials in the name Maung Tun Hla.

== Childhood years ==
M.T. Hla was born in a village by the name of Gyaung Wyne in the Tuntay township and received a monastic education. It is said that the monastery where he schooled was decorated in traditional Burmese floral arabesque and with imagery of mythical creatures and that M.T. Hla spent his time copying these designs in drawings. Of his own accord, he learned traditional one-line drawing, a singular technique of Burmese depiction in which imagery is often completed with long floral lines or even, from beginning to end, with one stroke of a drawing or painting implement. When he left the monastery, he became a painter, and like other artists such as Saya Chone (1866–1947) and Saya Aye (1872–1930), who had acquired skills in Traditional Burmese painting, he began to decorate pavilions at festivals, religious events, and funerals of monks. M.T. Hla's early background in Traditional painting is significant for although he embraced Western-style painting with much enthusiasm, remnants of Traditional depiction remained in his work, especially in his portraits.

== Ad hoc training from British artists ==
In the early 1900s, M.T. Hla encountered the British artist Sir Gerald Kelly (1879–1972), who came to Burma to paint its scenes and who later established his reputation in England largely through his landscapes of Burma and portraits of Burmese dancers and ladies. Gerald Kelly subsequently became a painter of note in Britain, becoming Official State Portrait Artist of the King and Queen during World War II and holding the office of President of the Royal Academy of Arts from the 1949 to 1954. According to the art scholar Min Naing, M.T. Hla received training of some kind from Gerald Kelly while Kelly was in Burma.

M.T. Hla almost certainly knew of the works of Robert Talbot Kelly (1861–1934), who had traveled to Burma a few years before Gerald Kelly and who published the book Burma Painted and Described with over 70 reproductions of his watercolors. The occasional watercolor by M.T, Hla has emerged which appears to have been inspired by images in Talbot Kelly's book, a point to be expected as Talbot Kelly's book was widely disseminated in Burma and became a kind of manual of watercolor style for early Burmese painters attempting to learn Western painting. Two other early Burmese artists in the Western style, for example, Ba Ohn (c.1877-fl. 1924) and Maung Maung Gyi (1890–1942) learned painting by copying images from Talbot Kelly's book.

With such ad hoc skills, M.T. Hla rose in Burma to become one of the foremost painters in the Western-style in Burma during the 1910s and 1920s, with his paintings decorating Rangoon's best hotels and his postcard paintings selling there. In Rangoon, his works sold readily at the Smart and Mookerdum bookstore, earning him a high income. According to Nyan Shein, his paintings were also reproduced in art publications in Britain. That M.T. Hla's work sold well to British customers is born out by the fact that a large number of his paintings have appeared in the hands of dealers and auctioneers in England over the past 20 years.

== Influence of Ba Nyan ==
M.T. Hla did not study at the Burma Art Club, where a generation of later painters in the Western style, such as Ba Zaw (1891–1942) and Ba Nyan (1897–1945), received more formal instruction by British colonials in Burma who had backgrounds in painting. And when Ba Nyan and Ba Zaw traveled to London to study at the Royal College of Art and returned to Burma in 1930, M.T. Hla's reputation was eclipsed by theirs. Although both Ba Nyan and Ba Zaw studied at the Royal College of Art (Ba Nyan for only a short time), their experience in London (and in Ba Nyan's case, Europe) were quite different. Ba Zaw became a severe standard-bearer of transparent watercolor painting of what may be called the British Watercolor School style, while Ba Nyan learned oil painting and gouache. When the two painters returned to Burma, a split developed in the Burmese art world; the transparent watercolor painters followed Ba Zaw, and the painters who were learning gouache or oil painting fell into Ba Nyan's camp. Despite a difference of a generation of age between M.T. Hla and Ba Nyan, M.T. Hla studied gouache technique from Ba Nyan (and probably oil painting as well); thus, in some watercolors done by M.T. Hla, those most likely done after 1930, opaque white sometimes appears.

Most of M.T. Hla's landscapes are standard riverbank and boat scenes, often including the de rigueur image of a bright-red flamboyant tree. These works, in transparent watercolor, might easily be taken as works by a painter with professional British training. They do not hint much of M.T. Hla's early background in Traditional Burmese arts, acquired when he was young and at monastery.

== M.T. Hla’s portraits ==
M.T. Hla's portraits are a different matter. He is recorded by the art writers G. Hla Maung and Nyan Shein as possessing strong skills in portraiture, to the degree that he could depict faces accurately and realistically, from memory, after 30 minutes or so of exposure to his subjects. While this may be true of faces, most of M.T. Hla's full body portraits reveal awkwardness of anatomical proportion, with figures appearing exaggeratedly short or squat, or standing stiffly as if posing self-consciously for a snapshot. It is possible that M.T. Hla's early background in Traditional Burmese painting, which is pictorially stiff in terms of its depictions, particularly of the Buddha or human figures, influenced these portraits. It is also possible, however, that he was attempting, just as painters such as Saya Aye and Saya Myit (1888–1966) (his student) did, to mix elements of Traditional Burmese painting with the Western style to create original effects.

The ambiguity regarding M.T. Hla's aesthetic aims in his watercolor portraits which bear Traditional elements is complicated by the fact that a fluid and stunning, emotive Western-style watercolor portrait by M.T. Hla appears in Burmese Painting: A Linear and Lateral History, but this painting has proved to be a rare case where M.T. Hla copied from a photograph. Nonetheless, M.T. Hla did produce some original masterpieces of Western-style portraiture. One is a group portrait in oil at the National Museum of Myanmar entitled Ladies from the Hilly Region. The painting is a startling work of realism in many respects, not least of which for its intriguing subject matter. It is a portrait of a bare-breasted group of females in the hills of Burma, amid large baskets of fruits and vegetables, wearing odd cusps over their noses. The ethnic identity of these figures is unknown and has never been identified.

== His legacy ==
M.T. Hla's many portraits of ethnic figures was a first for an artist in Burma. One might consider the tradition in Burmese painting out of which he emerged. In Traditional Burmese painting, the focus of works of art up to his time had been religious (i.e., Buddhist) tales or monarchial events and subjects. In the late 19th and early 20th century, the “family portrait” works of royal or wealthy families by Saya Chone and the portraits of high officials by Saya Aye appeared. But there was very little history of depicting the common person in works of painting, let alone members of distant ethnic groups, somewhat alien to the Burmese. M.T. Hla broke a path for Burmese artists into a new genre of exploration—the many minority groups of the nation. M.T. Hla's portraits may be said to possess a priceless slice of Burmese anthropological history.

Very few, if any, of M.T. Hla's oil works have surfaced abroad. Nyan Shein mentions a handful of oil paintings which he refers to as M.T. Hla's “masterpieces” but the location of most of these works is unknown. In the decade after 2000, the occasional undocumented oil painting appeared in Burma in the hands of art dealers.

In addition to watercolor and oil painting, M.T.Hla was considered a master of glass painting, an art form which he evidently passed on to his student Saya Myit. None of M.T. Hla's works on glass have been found in Burma in recent years, however.

== His death ==
During World War II, M.T. Hla lost his wife and two sons. Despite a healthy income during his productive years, M.T. Hla died in poverty in 1946.

== Museum and University Collections ==
- National Museum of Myanmar
- Denison University Museum

== See also ==
- Ba Nyan
- Sir Gerald Kelly
- Robert Talbot Kelly
- Saya Aye
- Maung Maung Gyi
- Saya Myit

== Bibliography ==
- Andrew Ranard (2009). "Early Pioneers of the Western School: British and Burmese". Burmese Painting: A Linear and Lateral History. Silkworm Books. ISBN 9789749511763.
- Derek Hudson (1975). For Love of Painting : the life of Sir Gerald Kelly. Peter Davies. ISBN 9780432069622.
- Maung, G. Hla (1968). On International and Burmese Painting (in Burmese). Sit Thi Daw Sarpay.
- Shein, Nyan (1998). "U Tun Hla (M.T. Hla) (1874-1946)". On Burmese Painters, Sculptors, and Architects, Vol. 1 (in Burmese). Sarpay Beikman.
- Naing, Min (1974). U Ba Nyan: His Life and His Paintings (in Burmese). Sarpay Beikman.
- Naing, Min (1975). The Royal Artist U Kyar Nyunt, His Age and His Art (in Burmese). Rangoon: Ministry of Culture.
