= Saya Myit =

Burmese painter

- Born: 1888
- Died: 1966 (aged 77–78)
- Known for: Painting
- Movement: Traditional Burmese Painting, Innovations in Western-Style Painting

Saya Myit (Burmese: ရာမြစ်; 1888–1966) was a major painter of the Traditional School in Burma who was a painter of Buddhist works for religious sites in Lower Burma. He is also popularly known for his Buddhist illustrations for books published by Zabhu Meit Swe Publishing House and Byinmazo Company. However, in the 1990s, an unknown, dynamic portion of his oeuvre surfaced in Burma—his more Western-style secular works, which had gone undocumented in Burma.

== Early education ==
Saya Myit was born to a family of peasants in the Tammanaing village, Kawhmu, Twante Township. His father, U Sine, was a respected sculptor and thus Saya Myit studied sculpture under him. Like many children in rural areas during his period, he received a monastic education, where his talent in art was encouraged. It is said that during this time, he once drew a picture of fruit among leaves on the wall of the monastery, and a squirrel, taking the depiction for the real thing, jumped at the picture and slipped down the wall.

== Professional education in art ==
His father died before he had finished his schooling, and his mother sent him to Saya Nyan (not to be confused with Ba Nyan) to study pavilion decoration. By the age of 16, he had fair mastery of this art. He later studied under the professional painter M.T. Hla (U Tun Hla) (1874–1946), who had a background in Traditional art, but who became a pioneer watercolorist of Burma, mastering Western techniques of painting. M.T. Hla picked up these skills through exposure to paintings by Robert Talbot Kelly in his book Burma Painted and Described, or postcards of the paintings from this book which were sold in stores. Hla also had contact and instruction of some kind with the Irish painter Sir Gerald Kelly; both Kellys traveled to Burma in the early 1900s and painted its landscapes and people. Thus, M.T. Hla would likely have trained Saya Myit in both the Traditional and Western style of painting. M.T. Hla was also considered a master of glass painting and apparently passed on these skills to Saya Myit although it seems no works in the glass painting genre have survived by either M.T. Hla or Saya Myit.

== Surprising discoveries of works ==
In the late 1990s and in the early years after 2000, unknown works by Saya Myit were discovered in Burma which called for a reappraisal of his oeuvre and his contributions to Burmese painting. In about 1996, a Burmese art dealer, Tin Win of Beikthano Gallery, happened upon four works by Saya Myit that were in the possession of one of Saya Myit's publishers of Buddhist illustrations for books. The four works belonged to a set of paintings which have been entitled An Auspicious Charity. The two most provocative paintings in the four-piece set, Motor Car Procession and Carriage Procession (both 51 x 78.5 cm), have been reproduced in books. The former painting appears in Old Myanmar Paintings in the Collection of U Win (2006) by Hla Tin Htun and both paintings appear in Burmese Painting: A Linear and Lateral History (2009) by Andrew Ranard. On the basis of the features of the motor car depicted in Motor Car Procession, the works can be dated to the early 1930s. The two paintings with vehicles are dramatically different from anything that had been produced in Burmese painting up until that time, or even now, in style and technique. In both paintings, the vehicles (carriage and motor car) sit in the center of the pieces, surrounded by a large crowd of followers who are depicted in minuscule, realistic detail. The atmospheric effects and linear perspective in the piece are polished and so are the anatomical proportions of all the subjects. In this sense, the paintings are of the Western style, but both possess Traditional features in the statuesque, arrested quality of the scenes. The crowd scenes depict privileged and powerful persons as well as the subservient or anonymous with equal determination of detail, and have been described as possessing a "democratic gestalt".

== Portrait works ==
Saya Myit, like his predecessor in the Traditional arts, Saya Aye (1872–1930), also produced a handful of stunning commissioned portraits. Three or four of these works by Saya Myit have emerged in Burma so far, and all of them, like Aye's portraits, mix features of Traditional Burmese painting—particularly floral arabesque—with Western-style painting. The colors in the paintings are rich and somber, Burmese in character, but unique to Saya Myit's work. Saya Myit was 16 years younger than Aye, and emerged as a painter in Burma later, when techniques of Western painting were more familiar to Burmese artists, and thus Myit's portraits, in technique at least, also reveal greater knowledge of Western painting.

== Origin of Myit's Western skills ==
Myit could not have picked up all his skills in Western-style painting from his master, M.T. Hla, as his work far surpasses M.T. Hla's in quality. Nor was Myit apparently a member of the Burma Art Club, founded in 1913 by amateur British painters who subsequently trained Burmese painters in the Western style. Since the paintings of An Auspicious Charity can be dated to the early 1930s, it seems probable that the portraits were done in the 1930s as well. 1930 was a threshold year in Burmese painting as that was when Ba Nyan returned from approximately eight years of academic and professional study in the painting arts in London. Within months after Ba Nyan's return, political activists, anxious to undermine British authority, called for the creation of a Burmese Artists and Handicraftsmen's Association (BAHA), which all painters might join, including the Traditional painters such as Saya Myit, who had never availed themselves of the privileged education at the Burma Art Club, open only to those painters who spoke English. Ba Nyan agreed to support the movement to create BAHA, and when it was founded, M.T. Hla, Myit's teacher, became the chairman of the organization; Ba Nyan became vice-chairman; and Saya Myit became one of a number of executive members. One of the purposes of BAHA was to provide a venue where the Western-educated painters such as Ba Nyan might mix with the Traditional painters and trade skills. It is quite likely that this is how Myit picked up his advanced skills in landscape and portraiture, through interaction with or observing Ba Nyan. (Saya Aye never had the advantage of such training as he died in 1930, the year Ba Nyan returned from England. Aye was senior to Ba Nyan by almost 30 years and possessed an exalted reputation as a Traditional painter in Burma and probably would not have responded to the opportunity to learn from Ba Nyan.)

== Portrait of Saya Chone ==
In 1949, Myit later produced a masterful portrait in oil of the famous early traditional painter, royal artist Saya Chone, done with a heavy impasto technique and complete mastery of Western painting. This painting possessed, ironically, no Traditional affects. As Chone had died in 1917, the image of Chone was taken from a photograph.

== Buddhist and nat works ==
Myit's Buddhist works were done for religious sites in Lower Burma. Unusual paintings of nats by Myit also emerged in the late 1990s and just after 2000. A painting of the Apannaka Jataka by Myit and one of his nat paintings are in the Fukuoka Asian Art Museum.

== Museum collections ==
- National Museum of Myanmar
- Fukuoka Asian Art Museum

== See also ==
- Saya Aye
- M.T. Hla (U Tun Hla)
- Ba Nyan

== Bibliography ==
- Andrew Ranard (2009). "The Grand Confluence: Traditional Painting Meets the West". Burmese Painting: A Linear and Lateral History. Silkworm Books. ISBN 9789749511763.
- G. Hla Maung (1968). On International and Burmese Painting (in Burmese). Sit Thi Daw Sarpay.
- Nyan Shein (1998). On Burmese Painters, Sculptors, and Architects, Vol. 1 (in Burmese). Sarpay Beikman.
- Min Naing (1974). U Ba Nyan: His Life and His Paintings (in Burmese). Sarpay Beikman.
- Hla Tin Htun (2006). Old Myanmar Paintings in the Collection of U Win. Thavibu Gallery. ISBN 974-9931-82-3.
