= The Great War (TV series) =

1964 First World War TV documentary

- Written by: John Terraine; Corelli Barnett
- Voices of: Marius Goring; Ralph Richardson; Cyril Luckham; Sebastian Shaw; Emlyn Williams
- Narrated by: Michael Redgrave
- Theme music composer: Wilfred Josephs
- Country of origin: United Kingdom
- No. of episodes: 26

Production
- Producers: Tony Essex; Gordon Watkins
- Running time: 40 minutes
- Production companies: BBC TV; Imperial War Museum; Canadian Broadcasting Corporation; Australian Broadcasting Commission

Original release
- Network: BBC2
- Release: 30 May – 22 November 1964

The Great War is a 26-episode documentary series from 1964 on the First World War. The documentary was a co-production of the Imperial War Museum, the British Broadcasting Corporation, the Canadian Broadcasting Corporation and the Australian Broadcasting Commission. The narrator is Michael Redgrave, with readings by Marius Goring, Ralph Richardson, Cyril Luckham, Sebastian Shaw and Emlyn Williams. Each episode is c. 40 minutes long.

== Production ==
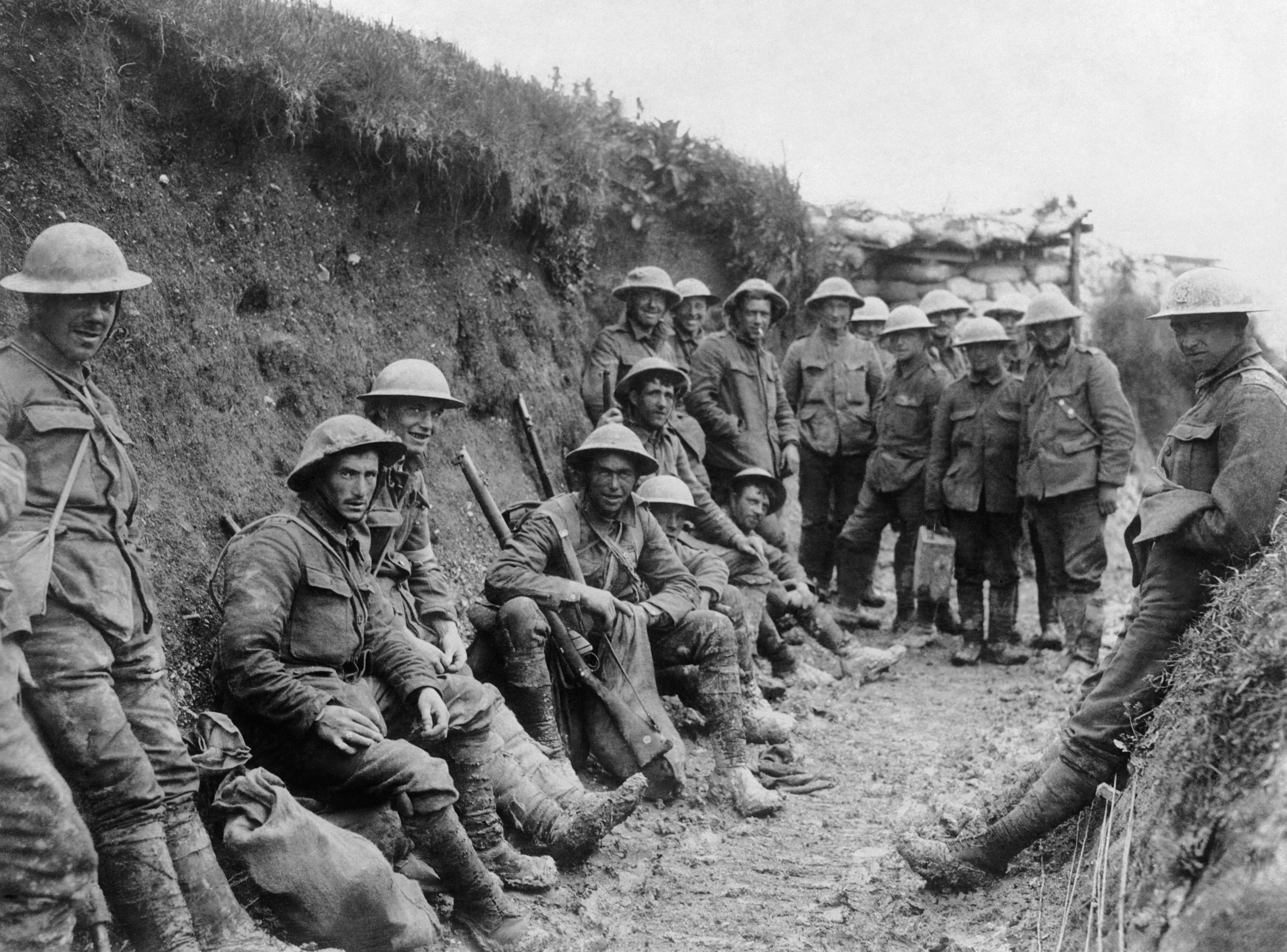
Image from the Imperial War Museum photo archive, part of the opening titles.

In August 1963, at the suggestion of Alasdair Milne, producer of the BBC's current affairs programme Tonight, the BBC resolved to mark the fiftieth anniversary of the outbreak of the First World War with a big television project. The series was the first to feature veterans, many of them still relatively fit men in their late sixties or early seventies, speaking of their experiences after a public appeal for veterans was published in the national press. Those who appeared in the series included Edward Spears, Henry Williamson, Horace Birks, Benjamin Muse, Melvin Krulewitch, George Langley, Keith Officer, Douglas Wimberley, Charles Carrington, Egbert Cadbury, Euan Rabagliati, Robert Cotton Money, Richard Talbot Kelly, Norman Demuth, Walter Greenwood and Cecil Arthur Lewis. The small number of Germans who appeared included Stephan Westmann and Gustav Lachmann. Others who were interviewed by the BBC but not featured in the series included Norman MacMillan, Mabel Lethbridge, Edgar von Spiegel, Edmund Blunden, Martin Niemöller, John Shea, Hans Howaldt, William Ibbett, Marthe Bibesco, Philip Joubert de la Ferté and Eric Dorman O'Gowan.

=== Academic contributors ===
Historians who worked on the series include John Terraine, Corelli Barnett, Victor Bonham-Carter, Alistair Horne, Jerome Kuehl and Harold Shukman. They are credited variously as writers, historical consultants and historical researchers. Max Hastings was employed as an assistant researcher on the series after leaving school.

=== Title sequence ===
In the series title sequence a rostrum camera created a montage of three images. The first shows a British soldier, in silhouette, standing over the grave of a comrade, the camera initially focusing on the grave's cross, where the words IN MEMORY are glimpsed. The second image shows a uniformed, skeletal corpse by the entrance to a dugout. The final image shows a lone Irish soldier, looking directly into the camera, apparently surrounded by corpses; this is a montage of several images combined for dramatic effect. The original image of the staring soldier, showing him surrounded by fellow soldiers rather than corpses, was taken from photograph Q 1 in the Imperial War Museum photograph archive but has been described as having quickly become symbolic of the First World War. (Note: The other two photographs were also taken from the Imperial War Museum photograph archive. The first, of the soldier standing over the grave, was Q 2757 and the second was Q 2041. The photographs were taken by Ernest Brooks, a British Army official photographer.) This title sequence was set against the series theme music, composed by Wilfred Josephs and performed by the BBC Northern Orchestra.

== Episode listing ==
The episode titles are taken from quotations, the origins of which are shown in parentheses. With few exceptions, successive blocks of episodes are devoted to each year of the war: episodes 1–6 to 1914, 7–10 to 1915, 11–14 to 1916, 15–19 to 1917, 20–23 and 26 to 1918.

No.	Title	Original release date
1	"On the Idle Hill of Summer..." (A. E. Housman)	30 May 1964
Profiles of the five European powers engaged at war's start: German Empire, French Third Republic, United Kingdom, Russian Empire and Austria-Hungary. The Balkan Wars and the assassination of Franz Ferdinand.
2	"For Such a Stupid Reason Too..." (Queen Mary)	6 June 1964
Political consequences of the assassination: the July Crisis. Austrian pressure on Serbia, involvement of Russia and Germany, the Schlieffen Plan and diplomatic exchanges leading to the British declaration of war on Germany.
3	"We Must Hack Our Way Through" (Bethmann-Hollweg)	13 June 1964
The start of war in the West. German invasion of Belgium, the Battle of Liège and subsequent atrocities. French advances and retreats in Alsace-Lorraine and the Ardennes, the deployment of the British Expeditionary Force. Interviewees include Stefan Westmann, Edward Spears and Euan Rabagliati.
4	"Our Hats We Doff to General Joffre" (1914 jingle)	20 June 1964
The events preceding the First Battle of the Marne. The fighting retreat of BEF and the French in the West, Russian invasion of East Prussia and German counter-attack at Tannenberg. The Battle of Mons, the First Battle of Guise and preparations for the defence of Paris. Interviewees include Robert Cotton Money, Edward Spears and Stefan Westmann.
5	"This Business May Last a Long Time" (Rudolf Binding)	27 June 1964
The stabilisation of the fronts. The First Battle of the Marne, the Race to the Sea, the Siege of Antwerp and the First Battle of Ypres in the West; Austrian defeats in Serbia and in Galicia in the East. Reprisals against Germans in Britain, mass enlistment in the British Empire and Christmas at the front lines. Interviewees include Edward Spears, Stefan Westmann and Henry Williamson.
6	"So Sleep Easy in Your Beds" (Admiral Fisher)	4 July 1964
The first months of war at sea. Naval supremacy of the Royal Navy and its vulnerabilities to mine and submarine warfare. The seizure of German overseas colonies, the Siege of Tsingtao, the raids of the Emden and the pursuit of Maximilian von Spee. The naval Battle of Heligoland Bight, Battle of Coronel, Battle of the Falkland Islands and the Battle of Dogger Bank.
7	"We Await the Heavenly Manna..." (Russian General)	11 July 1964
War in Europe in the first half of 1915. German success at the Second Battle of the Masurian Lakes, Russian Siege of Przemyśl, German Gorlice–Tarnów Offensive and Russian collapse due to severe shortage of materiel. German use of poison gas at the Second Battle of Ypres, British munitions shortage and the role of wartime industrial production. Interviewees include Gustav Lachmann.
8	"Why Don't You Come and Help?!" (Lloyd George)	18 July 1964
The effects of protracted war on civilian life of the major powers, with focus on Britain. The sinking of RMS Lusitania, reprisals against foreign nationals. The founding of Lloyd George's Ministry of Munitions, employment of women in the war industry, resulting labour disputes. Interviewees include Norman Demuth and Walter Greenwood.
9	"Please God Send Us a Victory..." (soldiers prayer)	25 July 1964
The Ottoman Empire joins the war on the side of the Central Powers. Armenian genocide and Gallipoli Campaign.
10	"What Are Our Allies Doing?" (Russian General)	1 August 1964
The war in the latter half of 1915, marked by successes of Central Powers. German and Austrian advance in the East, Russian withdrawal. Italy enters the war on the Allied side, attacking Austria and is stopped at the river Battles of the Isonzo. The Allied offensive in the Second Battle of Champagne and Third Battle of Artois falters. Serbia is overrun by German and Austrian troops, with Bulgaria joining the war in this operation, on the side of the Central Powers. Allied relief troops land in Salonika but are delayed by Greek internal politics, while Serb and Montenegrin forces and civilians flee through Albania to Corfu. Interviewees include Richard Talbot Kelly.
11	"Hell Cannot Be So Terrible" (a French soldier)	8 August 1964
The Battle of Verdun through June 1916, with a brief look at the civilian life in France at the time.
12	"For Gawd's Sake Don't Send Me" (1916 song)	15 August 1964
The British army in Picardy in 1916. Recruitment and training of volunteers in Britain, deployment in France, logistics of supplying a million-strong force. The artillery barrage preceding the Allied joint offensive. Interviewees include Charles Carrington.
13	"The Devil Is Coming..." (German soldier)	22 August 1964
The Battle of the Somme, with mentions of concurrent Allied offensives: the Brusilov Offensive in Galicia, Romanian invasion of Transylvania and several Battles of the Isonzo in Italy. All sides suffer immense losses, Germany adopts a defensive posture and Britain introduces tanks. Interviewees include Stefan Westmann.
14	"All This It Is Our Duty to Bear" (Lord Lansdowne)	29 August 1964
War-weariness in Europe. In Britain, conscription, loss of shipping to German U-boats, Easter Rising in Dublin, the Battle of Jutland and the death of Earl Kitchener. In Germany and Austria, loss of morale, construction of the Hindenburg Line and the death of Emperor Franz Joseph. In Russia, discontent bordering on revolution. A change of guard in Britain, Germany and France, favouring continuation of war.
15	"We Are Betrayed, Sold, Lost" (French soldier)	5 September 1964
The Western Front in 1917 prior to the arrival of US troops. German withdrawal to the Hindenburg Line, successful British diversion at Arras, French failure in the Nivelle Offensive. Mutinies in the French Army follow but are resolved by General Philippe Pétain. Interviewees include Edward Spears, Henry Williamson and Stefan Westmann.
16	"Right Is More Precious Than Peace" (President Wilson)	13 September 1964
United States enters the war. US foreign policy in early 20th century. Non-interventionism at war's start, swings of public opinion, industrial production favouring the Allies. Wilson's re-election and the declaration of war on Germany, prompted by the Zimmermann Telegram and unrestricted submarine warfare. Preparations for war, conscription, General Pershing's arrival in Europe.
17	"Surely We Have Perished" (Wilfred Owen)	20 September 1964
British and Dominion offensives in Flanders in 1917, originating from the Ypres Salient. The successful capture of Messines Ridge is followed by the Battle of Passchendaele, with many casualties on both sides. Rainy weather sets in early and armies bog down in mud. Interviewees include Cecil Arthur Lewis and Richard Talbot Kelly.
18	"Fat Rodzianko Has Sent Me Some Nonsense" (Tsar Nicholas II)	27 September 1964
Russian revolutions of 1917. Overview of life in imperial Russia and of consequences of war. Food revolts lead to February Revolution, the Czar abdicates. The Provisional Government continues the war, Germany helps Vladimir Lenin return to Petrograd. Failure of Kerensky Offensive, widespread desertions, October Revolution. Germany supports independence of Ukraine and Finland, forces the punitive Treaty of Brest-Litovsk on the Bolsheviks.
19	"The Hell Where Youth and Laughter Go" (Siegfried Sassoon)	4 October 1964
The Western Front at the end of 1917. Experiences: artistic portrayals, sounds and smells of the war, aerial photographs. The discrepancy in perceptions between soldiers and civilians, psychological breakdowns, sense of belonging to the unit. Georges Clemenceau becomes French Prime Minister, the Battle of Cambrai ends in stalemate. Interviewees include Charles Carrington, Horace Birks and Henry Williamson.
20	"Only War, Nothing but War" (Clemenceau)	11 October 1964
Impact of war on everyday life. Shell shock. Censorship and propaganda. British naval blockade leads to starvation diets in Germany. German submarine warfare, countermeasures, food shortages and rationing in Britain. Use of women's labour, better labour policies, women's suffrage. Zeppelin air raids, air defence, Gotha Raids, Mustard gas, railway guns and Paris Gun. Interviewees include Benjamin Muse and Egbert Cadbury.
21	"It Was Like the End of the World" (German soldier)	18 October 1964
The start of German spring offensives in 1918. Shortage of manpower in Allied lines, German reinforcements from the East. German offensives Operation Michael at the Somme and the Battle of the Lys in Flanders. Interviewees include Stefan Westmann.
22	"Damn Them, Are They Never Coming In?" (F. S. Oliver)	25 October 1964
The end of German advance in the West. Delayed deployment of US troops, German offensive in Champagne hastens their arrival. First AEF engagements. The final German assault halted, again at the Second Battle of the Marne. Brief footage of African American regiments. Interviewees include Melvin Krulewitch and Charles Carrington.
23	"When Must the End Be?" (Hindenburg)	1 November 1964
Allied offensives in summer 1918. French counter-offensive at the Marne, the Battle of Amiens, the Second Battle of the Somme, advance to the Hindenburg Line. In Britain, public protests yield to sceptical optimism. In Germany, troops lose morale and leaders realise that victory is impossible. Interviewees include Douglas Wimberley.
24	"Allah Made Mesopotamia – and Added Flies" (Arabian proverb)	8 November 1964
War in the Middle East. British capture Basra and mount an unsuccessful campaign toward Baghdad. Ottomans fail to capture Suez but check the British advance Palestine campaign begins. Britain encourages Arab Revolt against the weakened Ottomans, then captures Baghdad, Jerusalem and in 1918, Damascus. The dissolution of the Ottoman Empire, the seeds of future conflicts. Interviewees include George Langley.
25	"The Iron Thrones Are Falling" (British officer)	15 November 1964
War on the frontiers of Austria-Hungary, in the Balkans and in Italy. Allied troops in Greece establish the Macedonian Front but do not advance, the Central Powers occupy Romania. Allied intervention brings Greece to their side. Austrian and German troops breach the Italian front at the Battle of Caporetto and stop just short of Venice but next Austrian assault at the Piave fails. Allies breach the Macedonian Front, Bulgaria capitulates. Czechoslovakia and South Slavs declare independence, Italy launches counter-offensive Battle of Vittorio Veneto, Austria-Hungary capitulates and dissolves.
26	"...And We Were Young" (A. E. Housman)	22 November 1964
War's end. Allied Hundred Days' Offensive in the West continues, US President Wilson offers Fourteen Points as peace terms. Germany's allies capitulate after defeats on other fronts. Revolution in Germany, Kaiser Wilhelm abdicates, Germany accepts peace terms. Human costs of war, reception and celebration of the armistice. Interviewees include Henry Williamson and Keith Officer.

Two "Extra" episodes exist on the dual-layer DVD edition:

1. "Voices from the Western Front"
2. "The Finished Fighter"

== Musical score ==
The music for the series was composed by Wilfred Josephs. It was performed by the BBC Northern Symphony Orchestra conducted by George Hurst. His expressive yet unsentimental score was widely acclaimed at the time and many have recalled the strong contribution it made to the series. In August 2007, Guardian columnist Ian Jack remembered how at the start of each episode Josephs' "ominous music ushered the audience into the trenches". Much use was made of 20th century symphonies, including Shostakovich's 11th Symphony and Vaughan Williams' Sinfonia Antartica.

== Reception ==
Each episode of The Great War was seen by an average audience of over eight million people, a 17 percent share of the estimated viewing population. The fourth episode, the most popular of the series, reached an audience of over eleven million (22.6 percent of the audience).

=== Awards ===
The programme won a Bafta Special Award in 1964. Following transmission of the series by the Republic of Ireland's national TV station, Telefís Éireann, The Great War won a Jacob's Award at the 1964 presentation ceremony in Dublin.

== First World War centenary ==
On 16 October 2013, nearly fifty years after the release of the series, the BBC announced that unshown interview material, recorded during the making of The Great War, would be used in a new programme, provisionally titled My Great War, to be shown as part of the BBC's programmes during the First World War centenary. The programme was first broadcast on 14 March 2014, retitled I Was There: The Great War Interviews. BBC Four Collections published a selection of the original unedited interviews on BBC iPlayer as The Great War Interviews.

== DVD releases ==
There appear to be two releases as of mid-2007, both in the UK, both Region 2. The audio has been remastered. The first shows copyright 2001 and consists of five volumes, each housing two DVDs (single-layer). On the cover descriptions there is no mention of the Extra episodes The other shows copyright 2002 and consists of seven DVDs – six containing the original 26 episodes and one with the two Extras, the discs being dual-layer. It is distributed by DD Video.

== See also ==
- World War One – CBS production (1964)
- The World at War – Thames Television production (1973)
- The First World War - Channel 4 production (2003)
- The Somme – From Defeat to Victory - BBC production (2006)
