= Saya Aye =

Burmese artist (1872–1930)

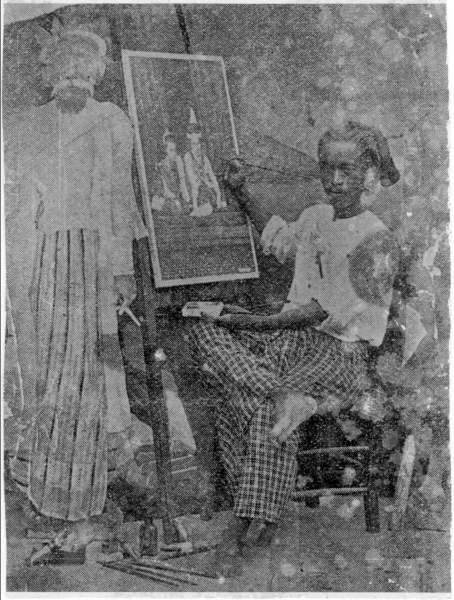
- Saya Aye
- Born: Saya Aye; 1872; Mandalay, Burma
- Died: 1930 (aged 57–58)
- Known for: Painting
- Movement: Traditional School
- Patrons: U Khandi

Saya Aye (Burmese: ဆရာအေး; 1872–1930) was a Burmese painter from Mandalay associated with the Traditional School. He was among the earliest artists in Burma to incorporate modern and Western stylistic elements into both religious and secular painting. His work significantly influenced the development of Burmese painting during the early decades of the 20th century.

== Training and early career ==
Saya Aye received an early monastic education, where his artistic talents were noticed, and he began formal art training at the age of 12 under a professional Traditional artist. He later became an apprentice to the Mandalay painter Saya Chone (1866–1917), a former royal artist during the reign of King Thibaw. Saya Aye learned Traditional painting by copying the works of Saya Chone and earlier royal artists such as Saya Sar and Kyar Nyunt. Although his training was rooted in traditional methods, his style incorporated Western influences from the outset, as Saya Chone himself had been exposed to Western painting and had introduced techniques such as linear and tonal perspective into his work—methods that were relatively new to Burma during the colonial period. Saya Aye eventually established his own studio in Mandalay, gaining recognition for illustrations and decorative art created for funeral ceremonies. He had aspired to become a royal Traditional artist, but this ambition was cut short following the fall of King Thibaw and the Konbaung dynasty to the British in 1885.

Saya Aye’s first major patron was U Khandi, a hermit monk in Mandalay who sought to preserve the customs and values of the Konbaung dynasty through visual art. Much of Saya Aye’s early career was devoted to painting scenes of the former Burmese monarchy and producing numerous Buddhist works—such as depictions of the Buddha’s life and the Jataka tales—for pagodas and religious buildings in Upper Burma, especially on Mandalay Hill. He developed a reputation for his detailed depictions of royal regalia and ornaments, and, alongside the painter Saya Mya Gyi, became one of the most acclaimed artists working in the traditional style during this period.

Before the rise of Western-influenced painting in Burma, marked by the return of Ba Nyan from his training in London in 1930, Buddhist-themed works dominated Burmese art. In the late 19th and early 20th centuries, these paintings were often executed on metal sheets, typically zinc, and hung beneath monastery and pagoda ceilings. Surviving works by Saya Aye can still be found in places such as the Eindawya Pagoda, though many have deteriorated after exposure to the elements for nearly a century, leaving the scenes barely legible. Much of his oeuvre has since been lost, vandalized, or degraded beyond recognition.

== Style ==
At least two of Saya Aye's court scenes of the Burmese monarchy, painted on zinc plates and dated 1918, have survived in relatively good condition. While his teacher, Saya Chone, had incorporated some Western techniques, he generally showed little interest in depicting human features with realism. With the exception of photographs of three or four lost portrait paintings, most of Chone’s figures lack individuation, with faces rendered in a similar manner, comparable to the stylized approach of ukiyo-e painting in Japan. By contrast, Saya Aye’s surviving court portraits display greater attention to individuality and expression, conveying a brooding atmosphere through the use of shadow and darkness. These works also demonstrate his mastery of sfumato.

== Western painting ==
It is not precisely known how Saya Aye acquired his more advanced skills in Western-style painting, but they do not appear to have come from Saya Chone, and Aye had no known formal training in Western art. It has been suggested that he studied Western painting through illustrations in foreign books, which would have been accessible during the colonial period. The early Burmese painter Maung Maung Gyi (1890–1942), who traveled to London around 1906 to pursue training in Western painting, is also said to have provided Aye with some instruction after returning to Burma in 1908 or 1909. According to some accounts, this exchange was reciprocal, with Maung Maung Gyi offering lessons in Western techniques while receiving instruction in Traditional painting from Aye, which continued to be highly valued at the time.

== Secular portrait works ==
In the 1990s, several gouache and oil portraits by Saya Aye were discovered in Burma, numbering about five or six in total. These works were primarily secular, typically depicting high officials or wealthy patrons, and appear to have been commissioned. They represent a departure from the Traditional style associated with his teacher Saya Chone, while still retaining some Traditional elements, particularly in the use of floral arabesque motifs.

The portraits incorporate techniques drawn from Western painting, including anatomical accuracy, depth through perspective, shading, foreshortening, and greater attention to individual expression. Burmese art historians have debated whether aspects of these works should be considered primarily Burmese or Western in influence, often reaching different conclusions. The consensus is that the paintings reflect a synthesis of both traditions, representing one of the earliest significant fusions of Burmese and Western styles. Despite having no formal training in Western art, Saya Aye developed a distinctive approach that marked an important step in the evolution of modern painting in Burma.

== Death and legacy ==
Saya Aye achieved financial success as a painter. In his 50s, he suffered a stroke that left him paralyzed and unable to continue painting. He subsequently passed on his workshop to his sons, Saw Maung and Phoo Gaung. Saw Maung (1900–1969), who received extensive training in Traditional painting from his father, continued the family workshop, producing Traditional religious works for patrons in Burma.

== Museum Collections ==
- National Museum of Myanmar
- Fukuoka Asian Art Museum

== See also ==
- Saw Maung
- Maung Maung Gyi
- Saya Myit
