= Monastic Education Development Group =

Monastic Education Development Group (MEDG) was founded in 2011 by Phaund Daw Oo Monastic Education High School principal, Venerable Vedanta Nayaka to promote Monastic Education High Schools in Myanmar. These monastic schools assist in filling the basic education needs of poor children and children from remote areas who do not have access to free government education. The organization attempts to increase the standards of education in monastic schools through teacher and administration training and is supported by both local and international non-governmental organizations. Currently the organization has trained teachers and staff in at least 355 schools.

The organization is led by Principle Vedanta Nayaka, Secretary Vedanta Vayama, and nine advisory members who are principles or secretaries in Mandalay, Tanintharyi, Yangon, Bago, Sagaing, South Shan State, and Magwe monastic schools.
