= Saw Maung (painter) =

Burmese painter (1900–1969)

- စောမောင်
- Born: 1900; Mandalay, British Burma
- Died: 1969 (aged 68–69)
- Education: Apprentice to Saya Aye
- Known for: Painting
- Movement: Mandalay School
- Awards: Alinga Kyaw Zaw

Saw Maung (Burmese: စောမောင် [sɔ́ màʊɰ̃]; 1900–1969) was a Burmese artist. He was the son of the artist Saya Aye (painter) (1872–1930), who in turn was an apprentice of Saya Chone (1866–1917), a young Royal Artist under King Thibaw. Thus, Saw Maung could directly trace his history of training to the pre-colonial times of Upper Burma when the country was still a monarchy and when Traditional paintings of Buddhist religious scenes was the dominant genre of production.

== Life and work ==
Saw Maung was widely known for his paintings about the life stories of the Buddha and also for a smaller oeuvre of Western-style portraits and landscapes. He was born in Mandalay in 1900, and began his career as an artist at the age of 14, under his father, Saya Aye, whose business he inherited. In the early colonial period, he achieved recognition through his paintings illustrating magazines such as the Myanmar Alin, Dagon and Kawi Myethman. After the Second World War, he visited London, where he studied European styles of painting and also took trips to the USA, China, and Hong Kong. His paintings exhibited fine workmanship. His illustrations of the sixteen point dreams of King Pasenadi of Kosala still hang on the side walls of Kyauktawgyi Buddha Temple.

== Legacy ==
It is difficult to judge Saw Maung's legacy for he spent most of his life painting Buddhist works for pagodas and temples in Upper Burma during a period of time when the vanguard in painting in Burma had switched to secular fine-art works heavily influenced by Western techniques and subjects. Saw Maung had as many as 20 painters working in his crew, depicting Buddhist works throughout Burma. The painters under his instruction or pay did fine art secular work in their free time as Saw Maung did. Among his crew were his close contemporaries, Chit Myae (c. 1903-76) and Chit Maung (1908–73), who became well-known secular-style watercolorists. Other painters in his crew, such as Ba Moe (1912–96) (his son-in-law), Kham Lun (1915–85), Kan Chun (Painter) (1928–95) (not to be confused with Kan Chun, the cartoonist), and Ohn Maung (1918–96) also sometimes produced stunning secular paintings, usually in oil. Because many of these painters were busy making a living under Saw Maung, their secular oeuvres are generally not large, and they and Saw Maung cannot be said to have belonged to a "movement" of art in Burma per se.

== Awards ==
- Awarded the Alinga Kyaw Zaw, the highest title that can be bestowed on an artist. The title has only been awarded to two painters, Saw Maung and Ngwe Gaing.

== Museum Collections ==
- National Museum of Myanmar
- Fukuoka Asian Art Museum
- Singapore Art Museum

== See also ==
- Saya Aye (painter)
