= Stephan Westmann =

German soldier and physician

Stephan Kurt Westmann (23 July 1893 – 7 October 1964) was a German soldier and physician.

In the First World War, Westmann served in the German 29th Infantry Division on the Western and Eastern fronts and then as an Air Force surgeon, although unqualified. He volunteered to serve in the Reichswehr after the war. After he was discharged, he completed his medical studies and became a professor at the University of Berlin, and in the 1930s migrated to England and became a doctor in Harley Street, Westminster. During the Second World War, he was a British medical officer in Scotland, so that in the two World Wars he served on different sides.

In later life, Westmann appeared on BBC television to talk about the First World War from the German point of view and also wrote his memoirs.

== Early life ==
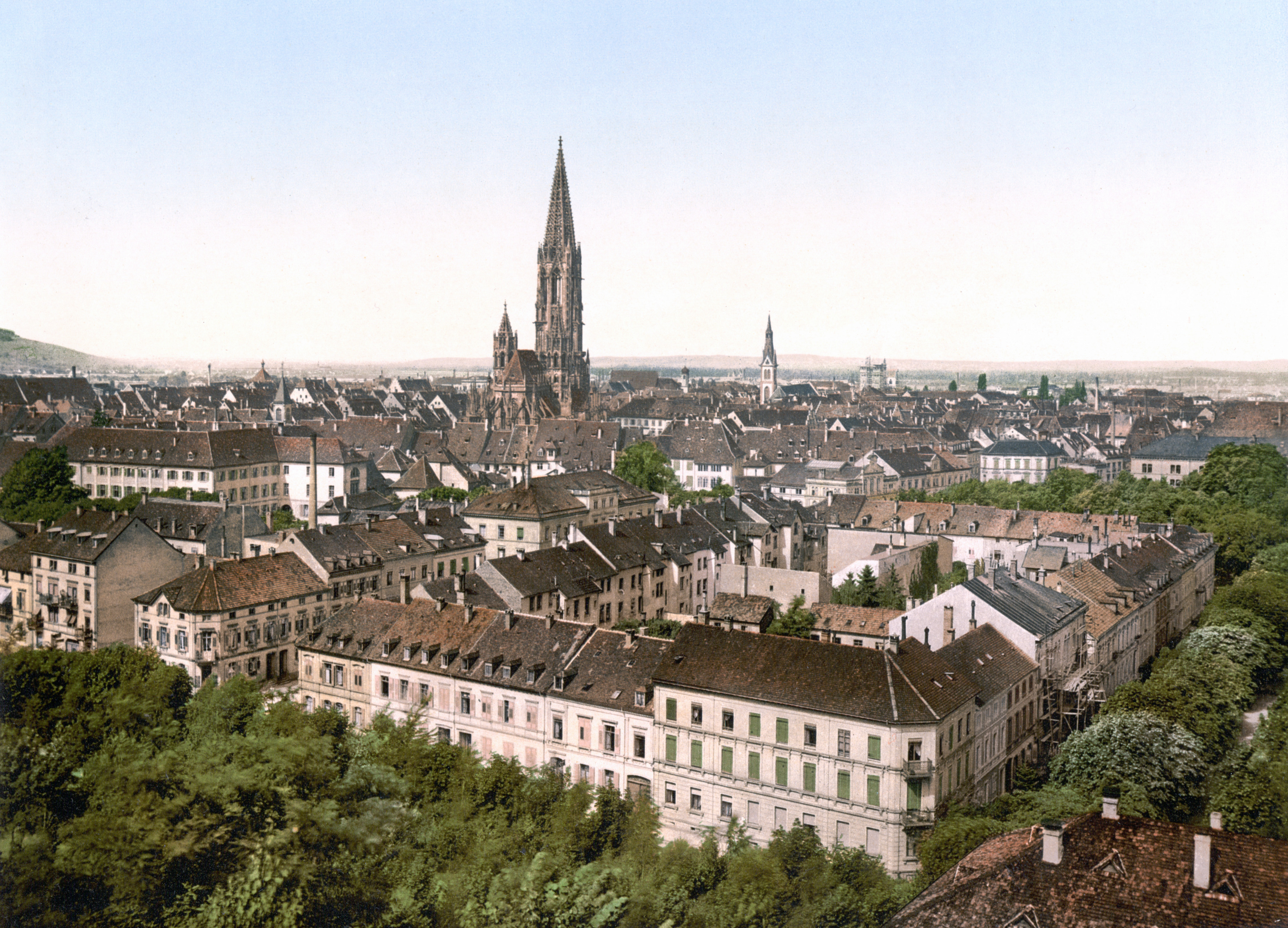
Freiburg

Westmann was born in Berlin, Kingdom of Prussia in July 1893, the son of Louis Westmann, a hat manufacturer. In 1913 he began to study medicine at the University of Freiburg, and early in 1914 was called up to join the German Army. However, initially medical students were part-time soldiers, continuing to study their subject and training with a locally-based regiment.

== First World War ==
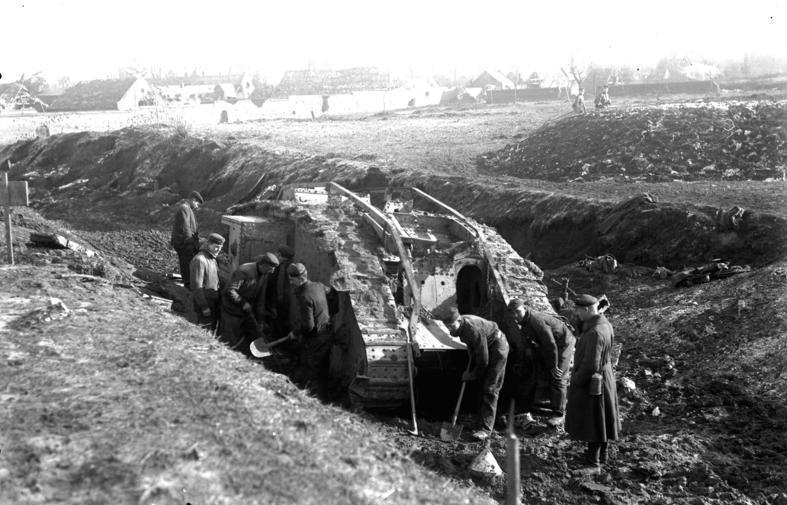
Battle of Cambrai

With the declarations of war of August 1914, Westmann speedily found himself serving with the Freiburg Infantry Regiment No. 113 (5th Baden), part of XIV Corps, and took part in fighting in Alsace-Lorraine, then part of Germany, which had been invaded by French forces. He was with the regiment for a year and became a non-commissioned officer, serving on the Western Front.

Shortly before Christmas Day, 1914, Westmann took part in an infantry assault on a British machine gun emplacement. Large numbers of his colleagues were killed, the survivors lay down, unable to move, and they began to be hit by shells, with body parts flying through the air. Westmann was astonished when the British then stopped firing and sent stretcher-bearers to rescue the German casualties. He was later awarded the Iron Cross (2nd Class) for his courage in fighting at Baccarat. After that, he was transferred for a few months to the Eastern Front.

On his return to the Western Front, Westmann was promoted to medical officer, even though he had not qualified as a physician, and was put in command of an ambulance train. He found himself working as a surgeon, operating on casualties of many nationalities, and also treated both German and Allied soldiers suffering from poison gas attacks. He was posted as a medical officer to the Richthofen Circus of the German Air Force, dealing with casualties of aerial combat. In 1917, he witnessed the British attack with tanks at the Battle of Cambrai.

== Later life ==
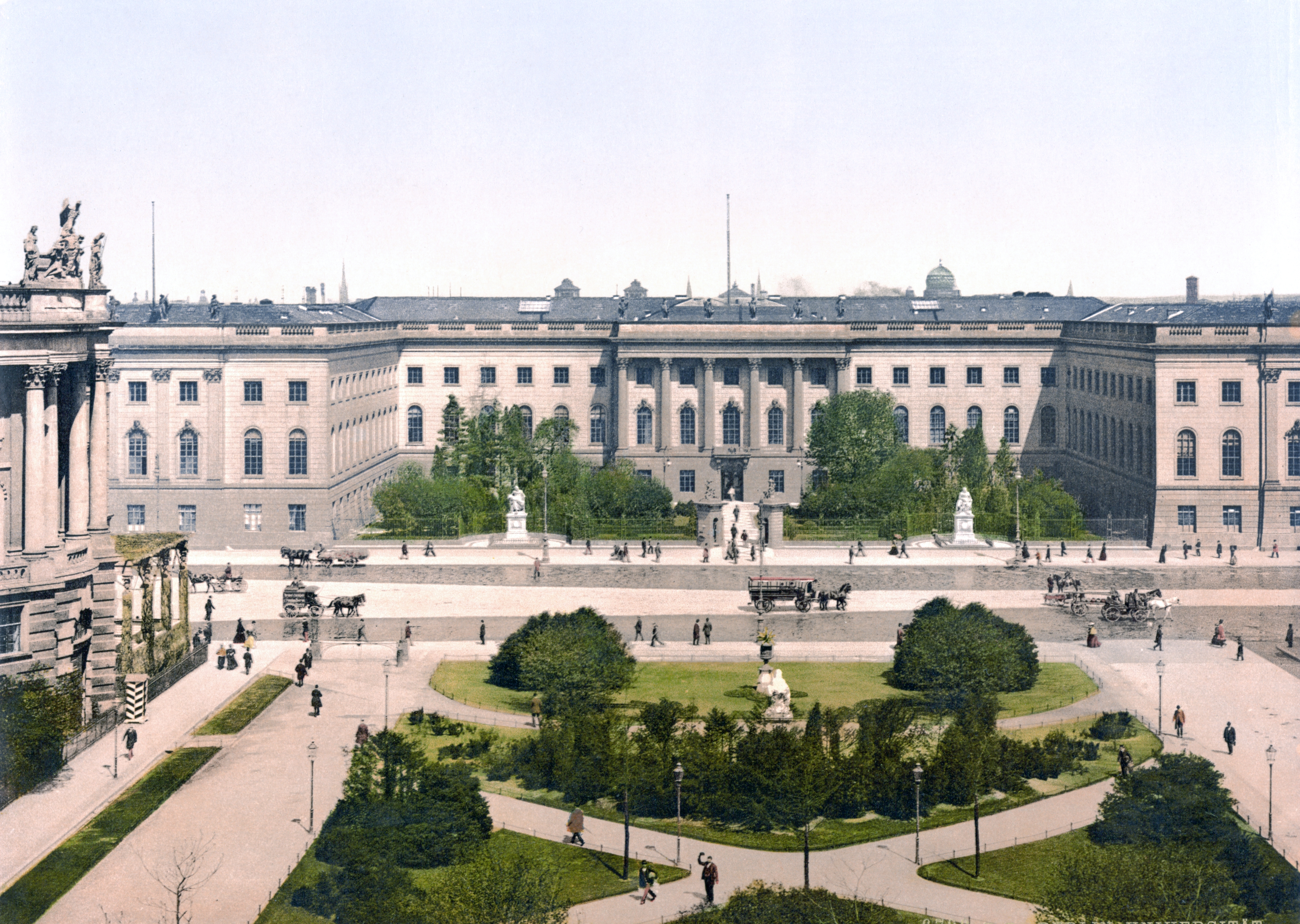
University of Berlin

Soon after the Armistice of 11 November 1918, Westmann was discharged. Almost at once he volunteered to serve in the 8th Hussars, a force to be used in cases of civil disorder, and continued to serve in the Reichswehr until 1920, including a period in the Reichswehrbrigade 15.

After at last being demobilized, Westmann returned home and qualified as a physician in Berlin. There, he married Marianna Goldschmidt, one of Germany's first women doctors. He became Professor of Obstetrics and Gynaecology at the University of Berlin. In the 1930s, he fled to Great Britain with his wife and children, after the subversive group he was a part of failed. He established a medical practice on Harley Street.

In November 1939, shortly after the beginning of the Second World War, Westmann was formally registered as a refugee and exempted from internment. During the war, he was put in charge of an Emergency Hospital in Lanarkshire and became an Honorary Colonel in the Royal Army Medical Corps.

Stephan Westmann died on 7 October 1964.

== Broadcaster and author ==
In 1939, Westmann published Sport, Physical Training and Womanhood, a book in which he considered the effects of sport on women and recommended that "too great indulgence in sports designed for men is not favourable for the child bearer of the race". The work was well-received by The Lancet.

In 1963, Westmann was interviewed by BBC television about his First World War experiences for its project The Great War, first broadcast in 1964. He spoke excellent English, although "with a German accent one could cut with a knife".

He wrote his memoirs of the First World War, which were edited by his grandson Michael Westman, a schoolmaster at Rossall School who was later head of the British International School, Shanghai.

== Publications ==
- S. K. Westmann, Sport, Physical Training and Womanhood (Baltimore: Williams & Wilkins, 1939)
- Stephan Kurt Westmann, Surgeon with the Kaiser's Army (London: William Kimber, 1968) & Michael Westman ed., (London: Pen & Sword Military, 2014, ISBN 978-1473821705)
