= Edgar Bundy =

English painter

Edgar Bundy ARA (1862 in Brighton – 1922 in London) was an English painter.

== Biography ==
Bundy had no formal training but learned some of his craft at the studio of Alfred Stevens. Bundy specialised in historical paintings in oil and watercolour, usually in a very detailed and narrative style, a genre which was very popular in the Edwardian time Bundy lived in. He exhibited at the Royal Academy in 1915 and at the Paris Salon in 1907. In the Tate Gallery is his Royal Academy painting of 1905 entitled The Morning of Sedgemoor depicting the Duke of Monmouth's rebels resting in a barn before the battle.

Influences in Bundy's work include Pre-Raphaelites such as John Millais, William Morris and the works of John Ruskin.

His daughter Dorothy married the painter Richard Barrett Talbot Kelly in 1924.

== Gallery of works ==
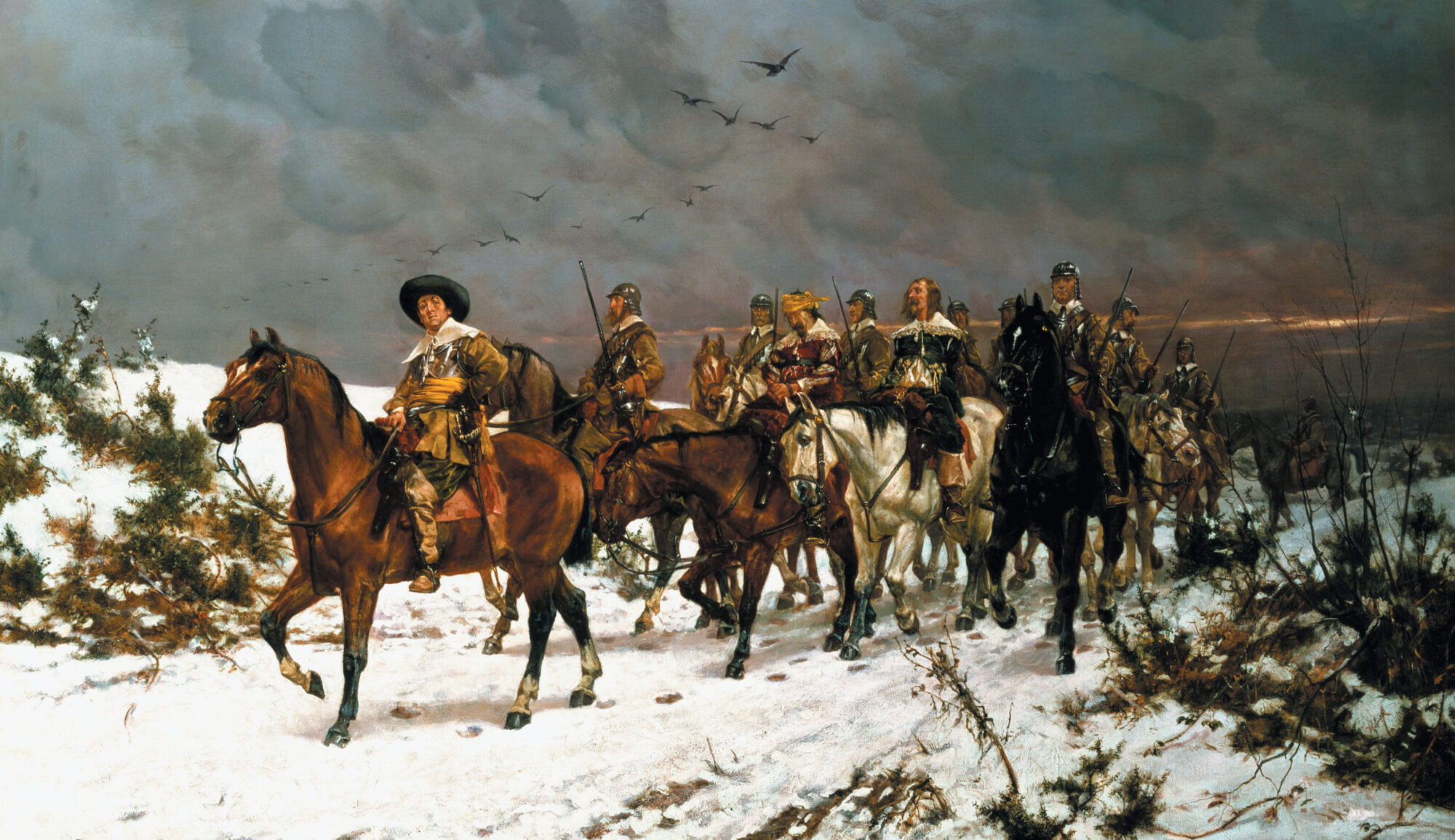
After Naseby (1887)

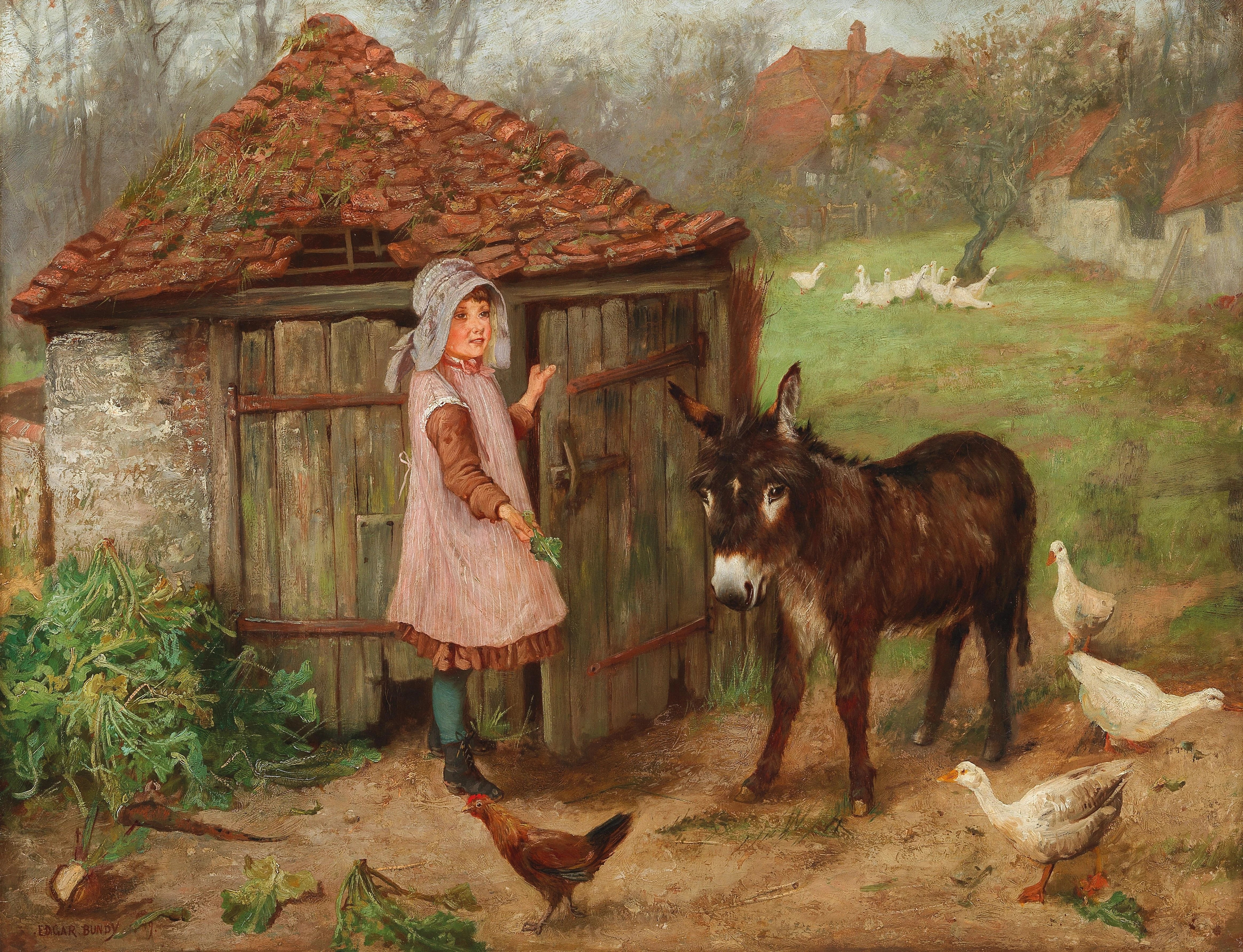
The Little Donkey (1889)

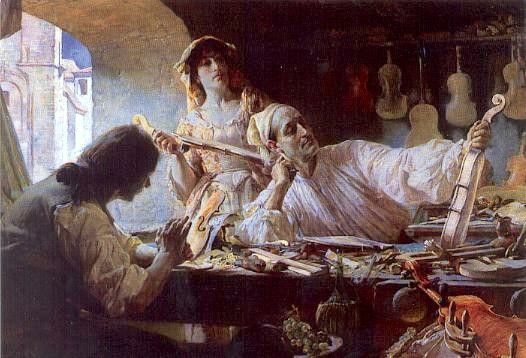
Antonio Stradivari at work in his studio (1893)

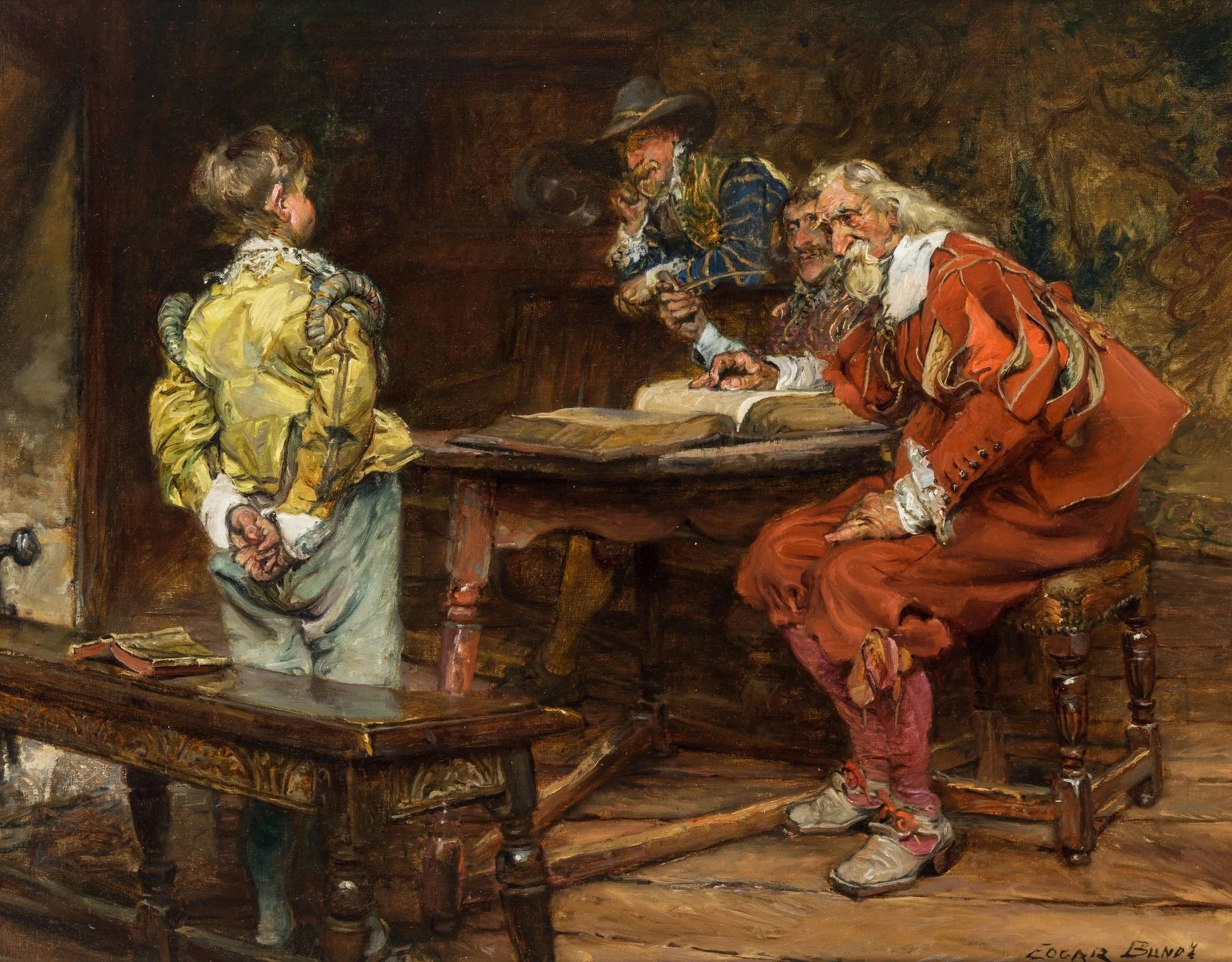
The Prodigal Son

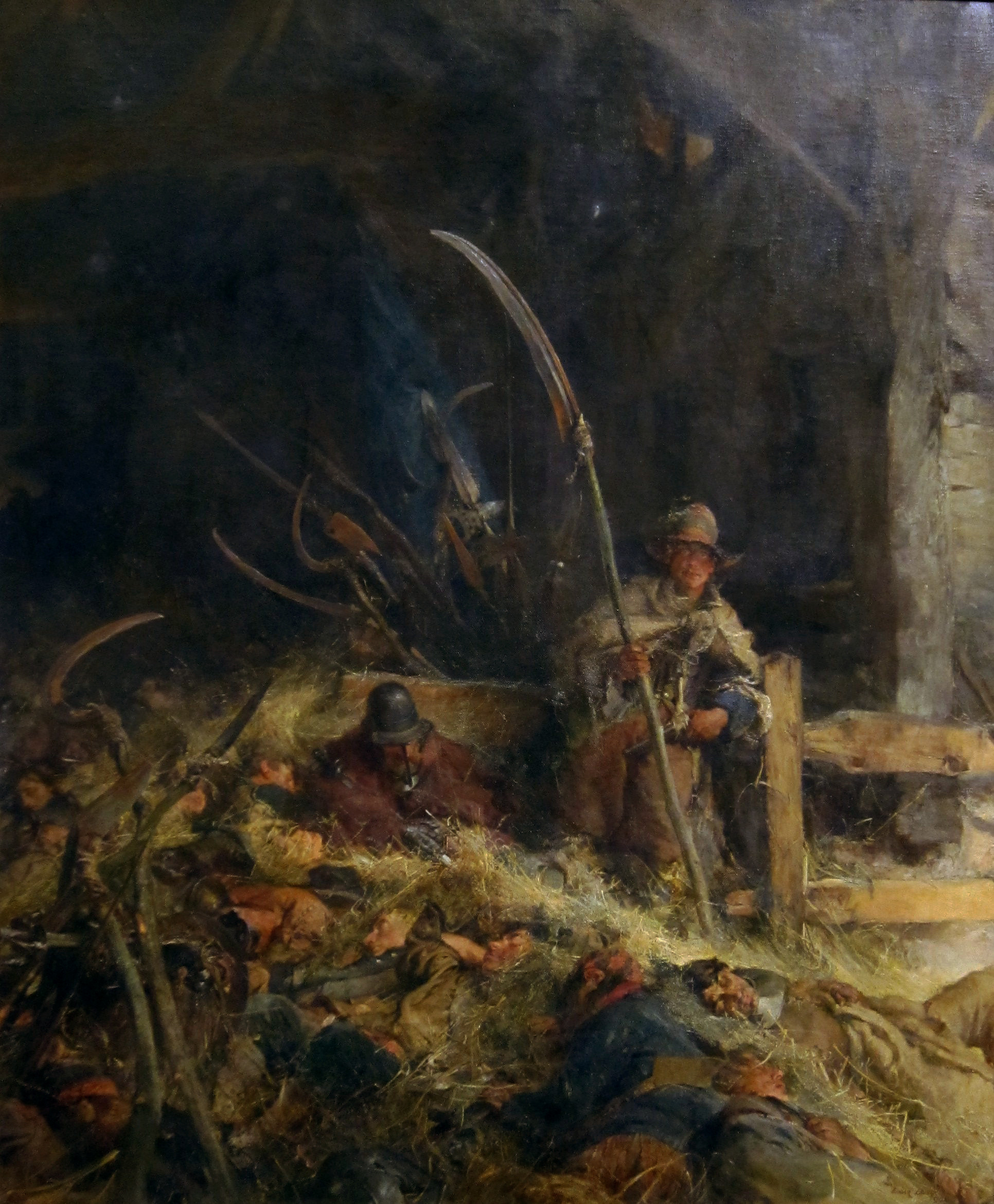
The Morning of Sedgemoor (1905)

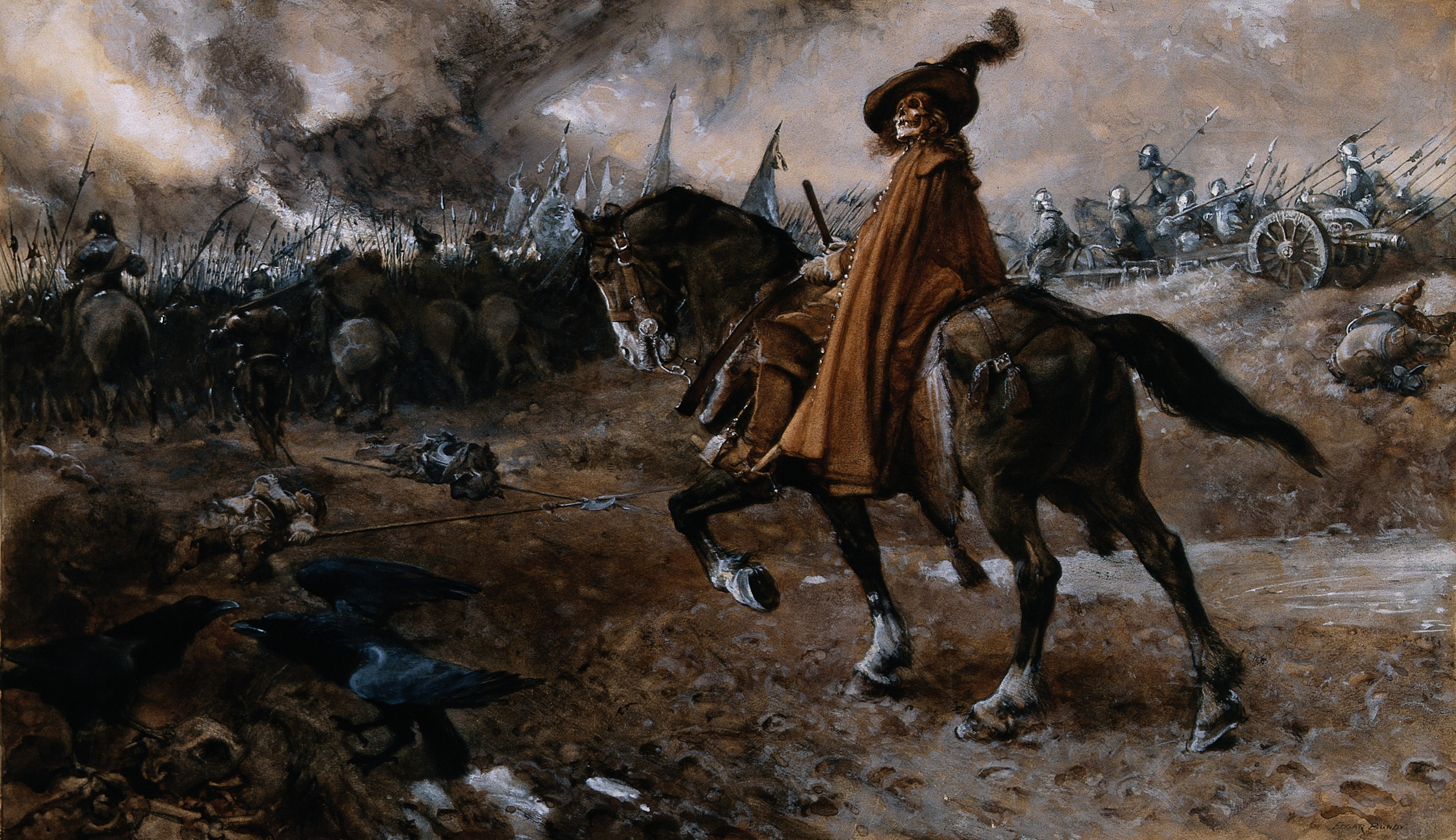
Death as General Rides a Horse on a Battlefield (1911)

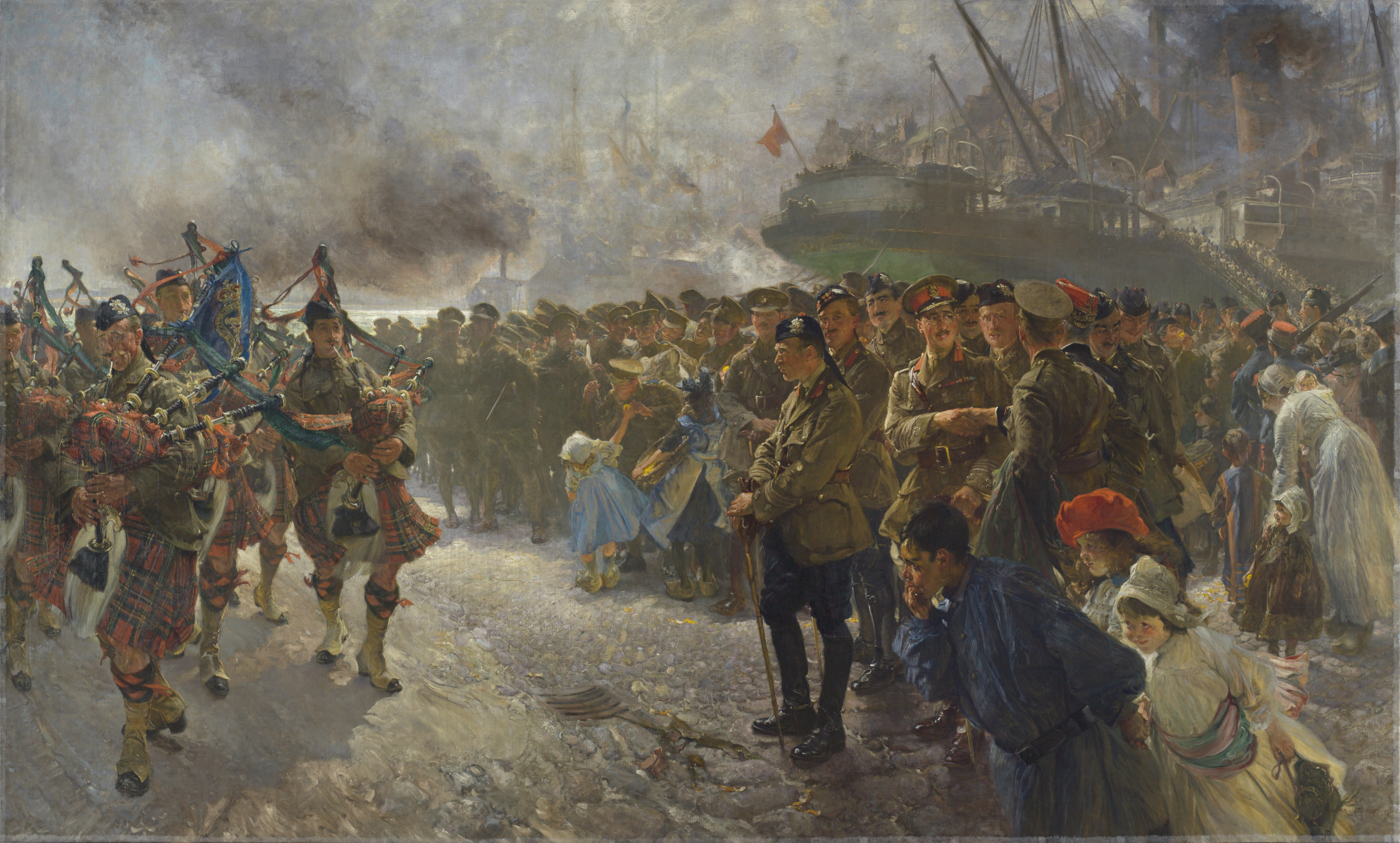
Landing of the First Canadian Division at Saint-Nazaire, 1915 (1918)
