= Phaungdawoo Monastic Education High School =

Monastic secondary school in Mandalay, Myanmar

Coordinates: 21°59′39.9″N 96°07′04.6″E

Phaungdawoo Monastic Education Affiliated High School
- ဖောင်တော်ဦး ဘုန်းတော်ကြီး သင်ပညာရေးတွဲဖက် အထက်တန်းကျောင်း

Location
- 19 Street, Nan Shae; Aungmyethazan Township; Mandalay; Myanmar

Information
- Other name: Phaung Daw Oo Monastic School
- Type: Monastic high school
- Motto: "Free Thought And Freedom"
- Denomination: Theravada Buddhist
- Established: May 5, 1993; 32 years ago
- Co-principals: Ven. Nayaka; Ven Jotika
- Faculty: 283
- Enrollment: 7849 (2015/2016); Primary 841, Secondary 1281, High School 5727, Pre-College 26, Bridging 150 (est)
- Website: pdoeducation.org; www.piueducation.org

Phaungdawoo Monastic Education Affiliated High School (Burmese: ဖောင်တော်ဦး ဘုန်းတော်ကြီး သင်ပညာရေးတွဲဖက် အထက်တန်းကျောင်း) or Phaung Daw Oo Monastic School is a high school of Theravada Buddhist monastic education located in Aungmyethazan Township, Mandalay, Myanmar.

Founded in 1993, the school comprises an Administration Department, Academic Department, Special Projects Development Department, Finance & Account Department, Vocational Department, Information Technology Department and Health Care Department. The school also has a notable HIV/AIDS prevention scheme and support groups. The school has a library, a clinic, and a furniture factory. The school was featured in a 2009 documentary, A Bright Future, for its implementation of child-centred approach (CCA) to teaching.

== History ==
Phaung Daw Oo was founded on May 5, 1993 with 10 teachers and 394 students. Principal U Nayaka's main focus was to provide for students from poor families who would not normally be able to attend school. Students of all religions and ethnicities are welcomed at PDO. Although it is a "monastic" school run by Theraveda monks, it offers a complete secular curricula as well as special classes in Buddhism and Pali for novices monks and any secular students who opt to take them. In addition to its primary education function, the school now partners with MEDG (Monastic Education Development Group)and donor organizations to offer many training workshops for teachers and school administrators.

== Campus ==
- The Japan-Myanmar Friendship Building (178 ft. long by 30 ft. wide) has one hall and 15 classrooms.
- The Australia-Myanmar Friendship Building (238 ft. long by 30 ft. wide) has 21 classrooms.
- The German-Myanmar Friendship Building (144 ft. long by 30 ft. wide) has one hall and 16 classrooms.
- The Win Thu Rein Building (70 ft. long by 30 ft. wide) has four classrooms.
- The Mud House Building (90 ft. long by 30 wide) has three classrooms.
- The NTTC Building ( about 150 ft. by 30 ft. wide) has a computer lab, 2 halls and 15 classrooms.
- The Tech Building 3 story, large hall, 3 computer labs, IT support area, 2 carpentry shops.
- The Clinic Building 2 story, several exam rooms, procedure areas for ophthalmology and dentistry.
- The Office Building administration, finance & payroll, volunteer management, etc.
- Several small buildings used by maintenance and engineering departments.

== Academic Profile ==
=== Mainstream ===
The Mainstream Department is the largest teaching department. It delivers a curriculum that encompasses all academic topics in line with government education reform. In the 2015/2016 academic year, there were 5727 high school students, 1281 middle school students, and 841 primary students, respectively. The school employs nearly 200 teachers, most have been trained in the teaching methodologies consistent with the Child Centered Approach (CCA) and Reading, Writing and Critical Thinking (RWCT). Academic staff are actively involved in Continuing Professional Development (CPD) to improve their own teaching practice.

=== Fast Track ===
The Fast Track English Language Department (FT) began operation in 2002, spearheaded by Principal U Nayaka; who wanted Phaung Daw Oo students to be on a level to compete with international school students. This teaching department consists of twelve classes, kindergarten (KG) through to Grade 8, with about 32 - 34 students in each class. Most teachers in FT have received teacher training in methodologies such as the Child Centered Approach (CCA); Reading, Writing, and Critical Thinking (RWCT); classroom management; and instruction in how to create lesson plans. Most of their trainers, some local and some foreign, were experts in teacher education. Students are normally taught all subjects in English, except Myanmar language. Curricula in FT are based on a combination of government textbooks and other resources: such as foreign texts and materials gleaned from the internet.

=== New Teacher Training Centre ===
The New Teacher Training Centre (NTTC), another teaching department, was founded in 2011 with 10 teachers. Initially, it was a five-year project that complements the FT program. The NTTC Department has continued to this day; sponsored by Forderverein Myanmar e.V.(a German NGO) The objective of the NTTC is to teach in English and promote the best modern teaching methods for students in Grade 5 and over; replacing rote learning with learning methods supported by cognitive science.

=== Library ===
The Sutakarmi Library was founded in 2000. The primary library donors were Diana and her husband, Graham Millington. The library consists of four rooms: a book room and media room (downstairs), and a research room and large study area/movie room (upstairs), staffed by six librarians. The library contains about 20,000 books covering a range of fiction, general and academic subjects; many in English. The majority of books have been donated by both local and foreign donors.

=== Bridging Program ===
The Dutch NGO, World Child Care, is funding the Bridging Program which supports young adults, most of whom are working and attending distance University (independent study with weekend classes). The local teachers have been given special training and are supplemented by foreign volunteers. The program uses the British Council's Cambridge curricula for three levels of study in English and Sociology. Student level is determine by a standardized placement test and most students are expected to progress through all three levels after which many take the qualification test for the PCP program. Student goals are focused on English language skills that will result in better jobs or IELTS exams to qualify for scholarships to foreign universities or fellowships abroad. There are about 100 students in this program. This program also has computers for students use.

=== Pre-College Program (PCP) ===
This program is taught by a combination of foreign teachers and prior graduates teaching a broad "prep school" curriculum that focuses on aspects of social science, civic engagement, leadership and personal development relevant to Myanmar youth. At the end of their academic program, each student travels to a remote, rural village school to participate in "service learning" as an assistant teacher. Many of these students subsequently secure scholarships for short internships, leadership training or graduate study abroad. A maximum of 24 students are accepted each year after a competitive selection process. This program provides learning opportunities delivered with the aid of the latest technology afforded by a dedicated fast broadband connection. Students have access to free Wi-Fi throughout their studies.

=== Vocational and Technical Training ===
PDO also offers training in carpentry, tailoring and computer skills. Students learn woodworking skills in the workshop where much of the school's furniture is made and tailoring in the two large classrooms equipped with sewing machines. Students may also use these machines to make products (longyis, book bags, purses) that are sold to provide a small income to cover materials. Students from all programs can access, and many are required to take, courses to develop basic computer skills. There are several modern computer labs and some students have gone on to work with the school's IT Department, developing vital technological support skills.

=== Phaung Daw Oo International University (PIU) ===
The University level programs has started since 2009.

== Administration Profile ==
=== Boy's Dormitory ===
Being a monastic school, the Boy's Dormitory is a novice dormitory (donated by the German government) which houses over 700 pupils. All of the novices in Phaung Daw Oo come from different families and regions around Myanmar. Most of the novices come from various ethnic groups such as the Palong, the Shan, the PaO, the Wa, the Nega, and the Karen. Most are Plaung and Sha, and the rest Bamar, Wa, PaO, and Nega. They also attend school and have various dreams and goals for a better future. The number of novices is increasing annually, so recently they have faced some difficulties with space and water.

=== Girl's Dormitory ===
The Girl's Dormitory (128 ft. long by 32 ft. wide) was also donated by the German government, and also houses students from other divisions, including 149 teachers. There are 38 rooms housing 73 students, with six rooms for visitors. There are four stairs.

=== Golden House ===
This building was donated by a Mr. Nego from the World Child Care Organization, for children rendered needy and homeless by the 2008 Nargis Cyclone. The principal supports and educates about 150 children and they are cared for by 15 teachers.

=== Ethnic Group ===
There is no donor for this ethnic group. The ethnic house is supported by the principal and they are minority group and only ethnic girls, housing two teachers and 80 students. The principal provides space and water.

=== Hostel ===
The hostel building has two stairs and is for the care of orphans and street children, managed by six teachers who look after almost 52 children.

== Vocational Training ==
=== Tailoring Class ===
With a facility that includes 50 sewing machines and two expert tailors on the teaching staff, this class also operates as a small businesses at Paung Daw Oo, generating income by selling traditional handicrafts and other items to foreigners.

=== Carpentry Workshop ===
The Carpentry Workshop was created in 2003 from funds donated by a Mr.Philippi and a Mr. Jager, of Germany, to train students interested in woodworking. There are six carpenters responsible for making new furniture and repairing old furniture for the school, and they also generate income for the school by serving outside customers.

=== Information Technology ===
The IT Department was opened from 2000–2001 and features 45 computers and seven teachers who give basic computer training to the students on a monthly basis. They are also responsible for all computer repair at the school, and generate revenue for the school by offering computer training to the wider public.

=== Physical Plant ===
The Physical Plant Department is maintained by three staff members who set up and maintain the electric power and water supply for the entire school.

== School Clinic ==
The School Clinic was first opened in 2002. Currently, Dr. Myint Khaing Htay manages the clinic and treats patients. The clinic serves both the students as well as members of the surrounding population who do not have access to healthcare.
