= Jerome Kuehl =

American-British television producer and historian (1931-2018)

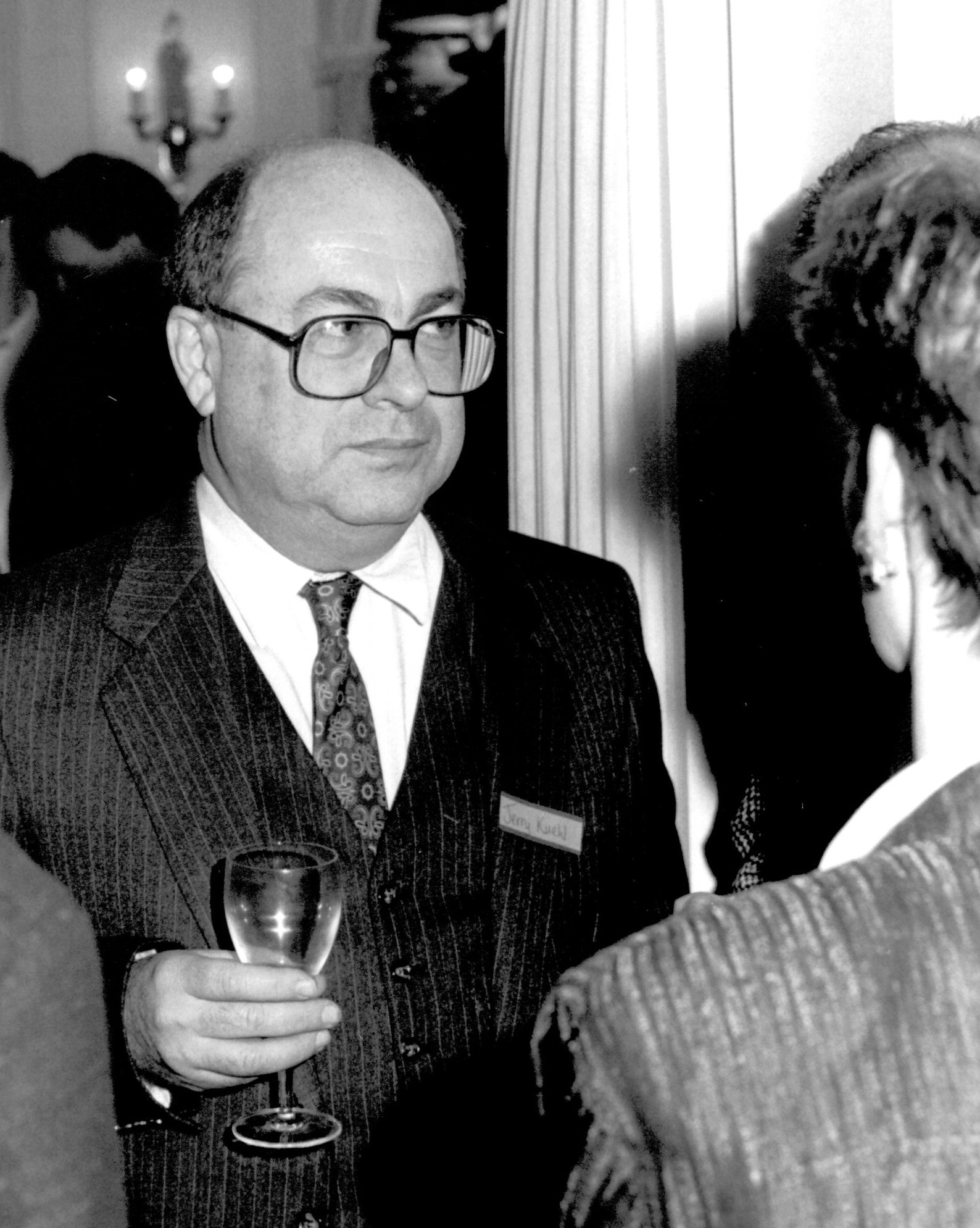
At an Open Media party for After Dark in 1991

Jerome Kuehl (widely known as Jerry Kuehl) (1931-2018) was an American-born television producer and historian who made substantial contributions to three landmark documentary television series The Great War, The World at War, and Cold War, as well as serving as a director of the production company Open Media from 1986 until his death in London in 2018.

== Birth and academic background ==
Born in Milwaukee in 1931, Kuehl read Philosophy and History at the Wesleyan University in Connecticut where he developed an interest in the history of newsreels. After studying at the Sorbonne he moved to the UK in the late 1950s as a post-graduate at St Antony's College, Oxford.

== Film and TV ==
After tutoring at the University of Oxford and teaching intellectual and German history at Stanford University Kuehl joined the BBC in 1963 as a historical adviser for its documentary series The Great War. His subsequent television production career was primarily in the field of film archive research. Kuehl worked for the NBC European Unit in the 1960s and wrote the documentary Chicago Blues for director Harley Cokeliss in 1970. He was then to specialise in writing and producing what he called "visual history" on television. As well as his work on The Great War, The World at War and Cold War, he made significant contributions to, among many other programmes, Auschwitz: The Nazis and 'The Final Solution' and Vietnam: A Television History. The Financial Times dubbed him “Officer Commanding Archive Integrity”. For France 3 he wrote and co-produced La Grande Aventure de la Presse Filmée (The Great Adventure of Newsreels).

In 1982 Channel 4 began transmission of the first of three series of his programme Today's History, described as looking at "official newsfilm and discover(ing) discrepancies between the way events have been presented and accounts of what actually happened". These programmes - which ran until 1984 - were a co-production between the magazine History Today and Visnews, with Kuehl as the executive producer. Subjects featured in the first series included: Poland (with Neal Ascherson), Women (with Juliet Gardiner) and Marx (with Stuart Hall). Each month History Today carried a supplement in the magazine linked to the programme.

Another series produced by Kuehl was his follow-up to The World At War called The World At War: Another Look, a Channel 4 series re-examining the original programmes with the benefit of a decade's hindsight. Transmitted at the end of 1983 and early 1984 - one episode a month - it features a number of academic historians and news cameramen who were responsible for filming some of the archive footage used in World At War. The first episode was described in The Times as dealing “with the political, ethical and strategic pressures on cameramen covering war, and asks how much we should believe of what we are shown.”

== After Dark ==
Kuehl made a considerable contribution to the British television discussion series After Dark between 1987 and 2003. As one of his responsibilities as director of the production company responsible, Open Media, he prepared a job description for potential staff. They would require, he wrote, “considerable experience of current affairs television, versatility, good humour and, above all, sympathy with and knowledge of many different viewpoints and people, not all of them sympathetic.” The historian Taylor Downing commented:

Fascinating discussions ensued on political, economic and cultural subjects. There were 90 episodes...It all seemed very much like a Jerry programme.

== Other work and later life ==
He was Head of General Studies at the National Film School from 1979 to 1981 and extended his work to write about the role of the television historian, for instance in ‘History on the Public Screen’ in The Historian and Film (1976) and in the first edition of the History Workshop Journal.

In 1998 the Observer newspaper quoted Kuehl on what he called the misuse of archive film in British television:

Things were being fudged...Battles were being misidentified. Ships that were not the Titanic were trying to pass themselves off as the Titanic. `Pictures,' (Kuehl) revealed, `do lie.' And what about soundtracks?...(V)iewers may have noticed the lies if that's the word we're using that seem to have been added to almost every piece of apparently silent archive film. Clip-clop go the horses. Choo-choo goes the train. Rarararara goes the restless proletariat all with the acoustic realism of someone with a coconut shell in the school play. Only the H-bomb is allowed to exist in silence.

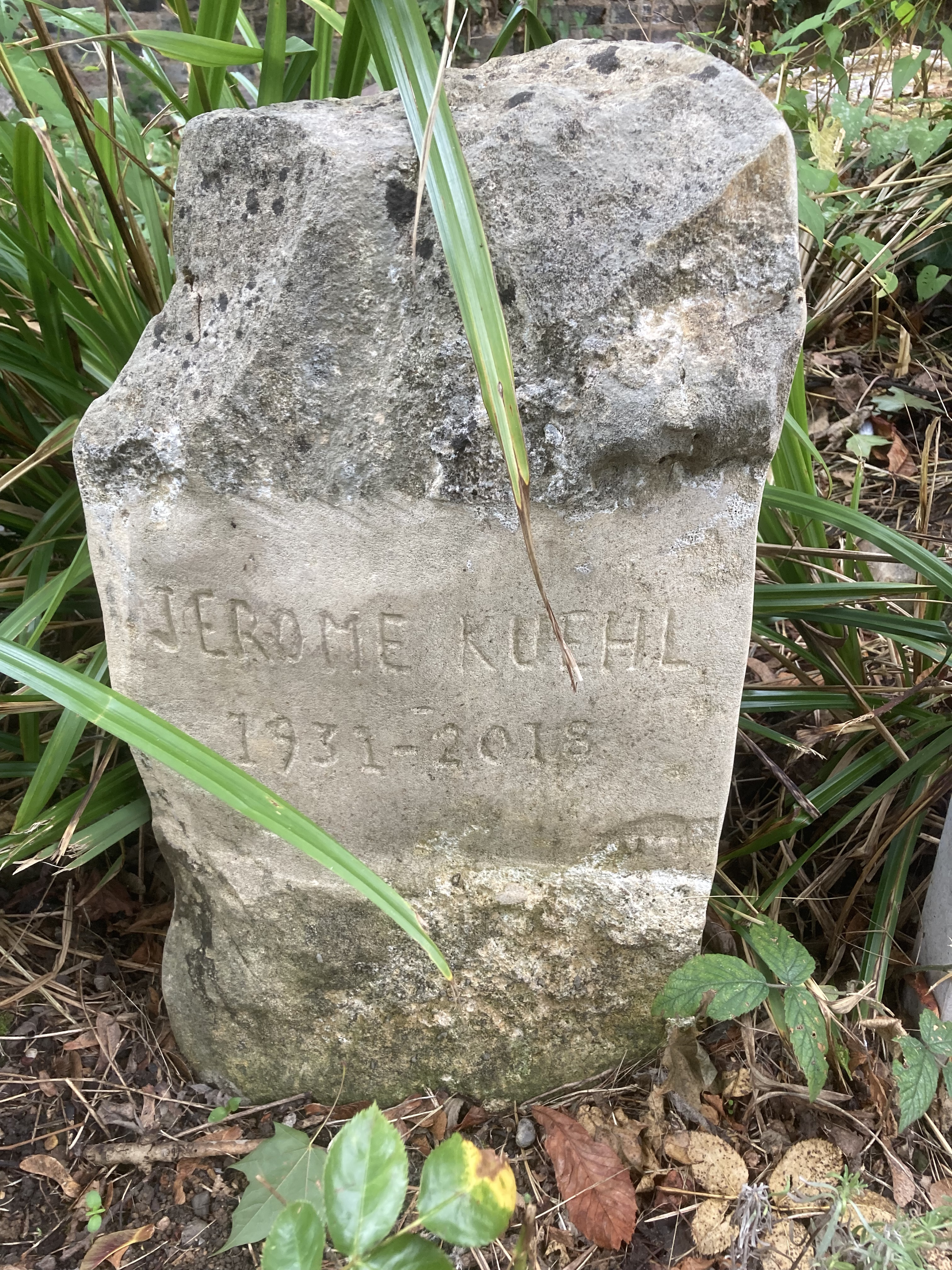
Grave of Jerome Kuehl in Highgate Cemetery

He was a member of the consortium that bought the magazine History Today from Pearson, acting as a director from 1981. In 1986 he was a co-founder of the television production company Open Media. For many years he was a Council member of IAMHIST, the organisation that publishes the Historical Journal of Film, Radio and Television. In 2004 he was awarded the Lifetime Achievement Award by FOCAL International, the Federation of Commercial Audiovisual Libraries.

He died in London on 16 September 2018, aged 86 and is buried on the eastern side of Highgate Cemetery.

== The Office Cat ==
In his long-running column "The Office Cat", he wrote:

unlike human film researchers the Office Cat can find any film whether or not it exists. Thus the Cat could – and did – find ‘film’ of Adolf Hitler marrying Eva Braun in the Führerbunker; of the Wright Brothers’ first flight in 1903; and of the iceberg which sank the Titanic. Producers and Directors demand such images, and film researchers, often with a heavy heart, try to provide them.

Juliet Gardiner said of his work: "Jerry stuck firmly to his creed of popularisation without vulgarisation. His mission (was) to make scholarly history accessible."

== Publications ==
Kuehl wrote for many historical, media and general interest publications, including

- Broadcast
- Cineaste
- International Affairs
- International History Review
- The Journal of the Association of Moving Image Archivists
- The Journal of the British Academy of Film and Television Arts
- Journal of War and Culture Studies
- Sight & Sound
- TLS
