= Robert Talbot Kelly =

English painter (1861–1934)

Robert George Talbot Kelly
- Born: 1861; Birkenhead, Cheshire, England
- Died: 1934 (aged 72–73); London, England
- Known for: Painting
- Movement: British orientalism

Robert George Talbot Kelly (1861–1934) was an English orientalist landscape and genre painter, author and illustrator.

== Early life ==
Kelly was born in Birkenhead, Cheshire, the son of Irish landscape and portrait painter, Robert George Kelly. He left school in 1876 to take up work in a firm of cotton traders, but also received an art education from his father, exhibiting under the name R. G. Kelly Jnr.

== In North Africa ==
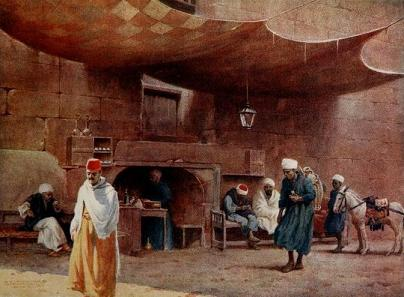
An Arab cafe in Cairo (from Egypt Painted and Described, 1902)

He travelled to Egypt several times. In the early 1880s, inspired by the places he saw while on vacation on an ocean cruise ship, Talbot-Kelly decided to take up his father's profession. He left his employment in 1882, travelled by boat to North Africa, and settled in Egypt in 1883, acquiring a studio in Cairo and becoming fluent in Arabic. He travelled throughout the country, writing about and painting the people and scenes he encountered both in towns and in the desert. He spent a considerable time with the Bedouin tribes whom he described and illustrated in his 1902 book, Egypt Painted and Described (A & C Black). As his name became known he also earned an income from private commissions. He stayed in Egypt until 1915 when, for reasons of health and age, he returned to London - though he continued to paint constantly.

Egypt Painted and Described, his first illustrated travel book, was published in 1902 (by A & C Black), and was an account of his impressions and experiences of that country during his long stay there; an exhibition of his Egyptian views was also held at the Fine Art Society in the same year. His paintings and writing showed a great empathy and respect for local people and culture, especially that of the desert Bedouin Arabs.

Prior to publishing his books on Egypt, Kelly provided illustrations for Von Slatin's Fire and Sword in the Sudan (1896). He also travelled to Iceland.

== In Burma ==
Kelly travelled to Burma, which he wrote about and painted for two books published by A & C Black, Burma Painted and Described (1905) and Burma (1909). The former contains reproductions of 73 of Kelly's paintings and the latter contains 12 reproductions, all of which also appeared in the first book.

On his trip through Burma and the paintings he left of the country, Kelly had a significant impact on the early 20th century development of Burmese painting. In Burma, he is believed to have met and taught the basics of Western painting to a major painter of Burma, M.T. Hla (U Tun Hla) (1874–1946), and the paintings of Maung Maung Gyi (painter) (1890–1942) and Ba Ohn (c.1877-fl.1924) show clear influence of Kelly's style in certain works, to the point, in one case, of an exact replica. The latter two painters may possibly have met Kelly and received some instruction from him, but this would not have been necessary for Kelly's influence to have occurred. Kelly's two books were widely available in Burma, or so were postcard reproductions, which were sold in Burma, of the paintings in his books.

Kelly also did fine art reproductions of his watercolors on Burma (dated 1912) which today sell widely on the internet.

== His media and professional memberships ==
Talbot-Kelly worked mainly in watercolour and black and white. He was a member of the Royal Institute of Painters in Water Colours (RI), Royal Society of British Artists (RBA), Royal British Colonial Society of Artists (RBC) and the Royal Geographical Society (RGS).

He was President of the Liver Sketching Club in Liverpool in 1917 and also a member of the Artists' Club Liverpool, of which his father, Robert George Kelly, was a founder member.

== His death ==
Kelly died in London in 1934. He was married and had a son, Richard Barrett Talbot Kelly (1896–1971), MBE MC RI, who was also an artist, specialising in bird painting and historical subjects and an illustrator and who was a Lieutenant in the Royal Field Artillery in the First World War.

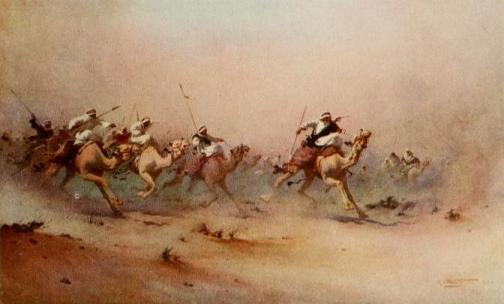
Painting by Robert Talbot Kelly

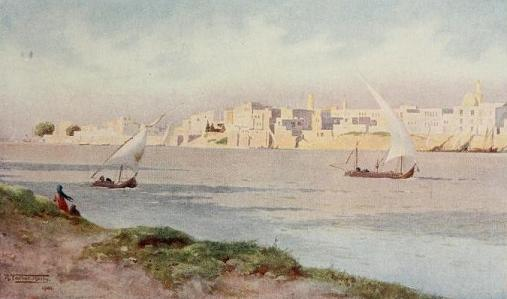
Painting by Talbot Kelly

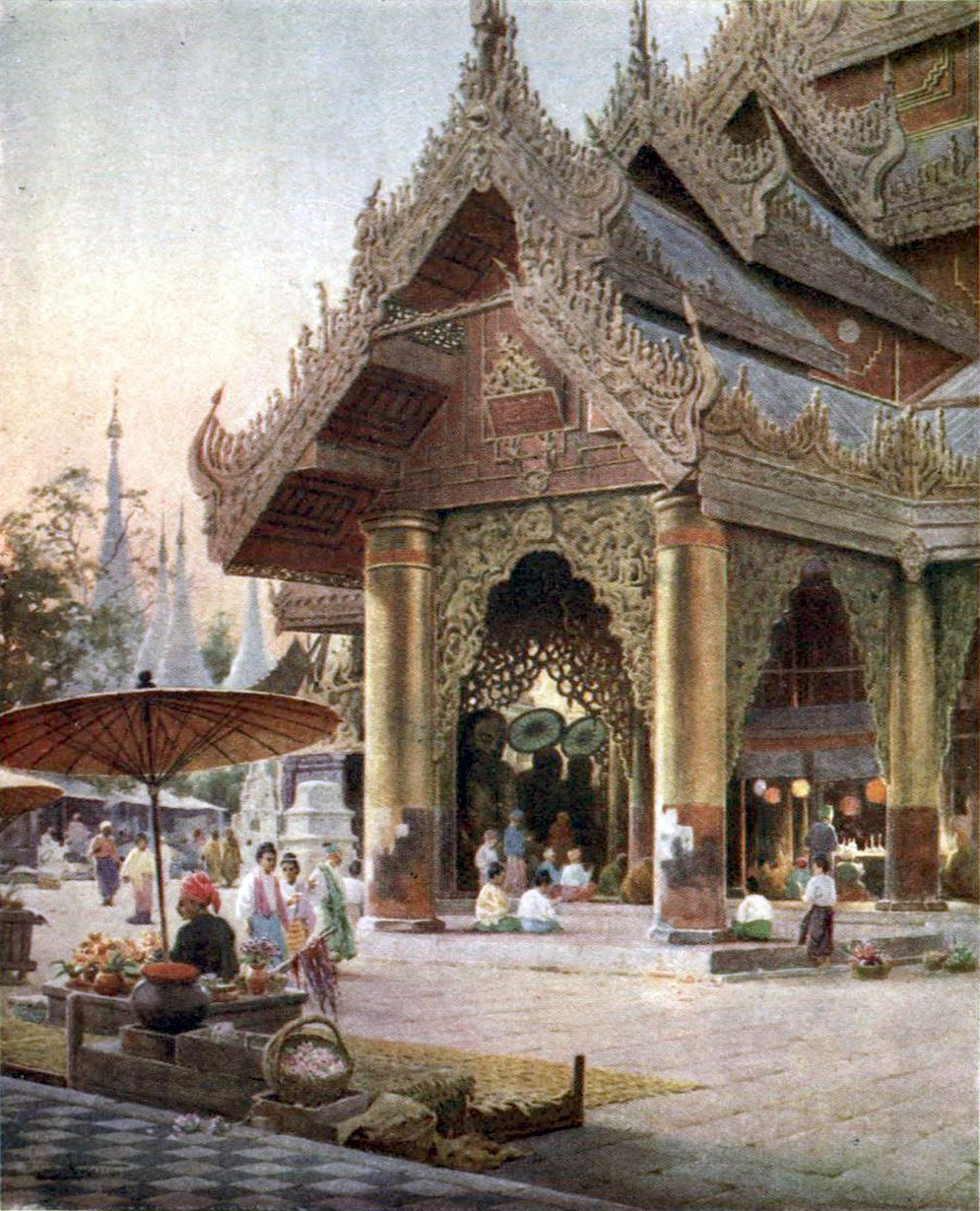
Painting by Talbot Kelly

== See also ==
- List of Orientalist artists
- Orientalism

== Bibliography ==
Written and illustrated by Kelly;

- Egypt Painted and Described (A & C Black, 1902).
- Burma Painted and Described (A & C Black, 1905).
- Burma (A & C Black, 1908).
- Egypt (A & C Black, 1908).
- Burma; the Land and the People (Boston: J. B. Millet, 1910).

Illustrated by Kelly

- Slatin, R. C. F. Von. Fire and Sword in the Sudan (Edward Arnold, 1896).

About Kelly;

- Thornton, Lynne. The Orientalists - Painter-Travellers, 1828-1908 (ACR Edition, 1995) pp. 168–169.
- Pollack, Oliver B. "Robert Talbot Kelly and Picturesque Burma" (Journal of Burma Studies 3, 1998: 35-45.).
- Khatib, Hisham: Palestine and Egypt Under the Ottomans: Paintings, Books, Photographs, Maps and Manuscripts (I. B. Tauris, 2003) p. 110.
- Ackerman, Gerald M. Les Orientalistes De L'Ecole Britannique (ACR Edition, 2010) pp. 138–140.
- Ramm, John A "Talented Inherited:The Kelly Family of Artists" (Antique Dealer & Collectors Guide, Sep/Oct 2004, Vol 58, 2/3)
- Ranard, Andrew. "Early Pioneers of the Western School: British and Burmese." Burmese Painting: A Linear and Lateral History. (Silkworm Books, 2009) pp. 47–69.
