= Maung Maung Gyi =

Burmese painter

- မောင်မောင်ကြီး
- Born: 1890; Rangoon, British Burma
- Died: 1942 (aged 51–52); Japanese Burma
- Known for: Painting
- Movement: Plein air watercolor

Maung Maung Gyi (Burmese: မောင်မောင်ကြီး, pronounced [màʊɰ̃ màʊɰ̃ dʑí]; 1890–1942) was an early watercolor painter from Yangon and the first Burmese to travel abroad for studies in Western painting.

== Early history and training ==
Maung Maung Gyi lost his mother in early childhood and so his father sent him to Yangon High School as a boarding student. There he exhibited an interest in drawing, but he was temperamental and one day quarreled with a teacher and quit school. He then decided to travel to England to study art. The events which followed, attributed to the year 1906, have become a part of Burmese folklore. He allegedly went to Rangoon harbor to find a ship which would carry him to England and asked the captain of one ship there for a job as a seaman. While talking to the captain he drew his portrait, and the captain was so taken with the youth’s portrait of him and his adventuresome spirit that he agreed to take him on board as a seaman. Maung Maung Gyi was about 16 years old at that time.

Maung Maung Gyi reached England and studied there for two or three years. It is not known what school he attended, but his main studies seemed to have been agriculture, as well as art and chemistry. There is some possibility that during his time in England he may also have had to work as a dishwasher to make ends meet. It seems not to have been an institution of higher learning for when he returned to Burma, about 1908 or shortly thereafter, he continued with his secondary education at St. Paul’s English High School in Rangoon for two years. Following his studies at St. Paul’s, he became an agricultural officer for the colonial government, which offered him the chance to tour the country, painting its scenes in his free time.

== Personality and further imbroglios ==
As a youth who had traveled to England in such a daring way, Maung Maung Gyi became famous in Burma, as a model to young Burmese youth who were so provincial and timid that they often feared leaving their villages. He became notorious in other respects. Although he developed a passion for Western-style painting, he had a great resentment of his colonial masters, especially British officers. In 1938, when a Burmese-Indian massacre or riot broke out in Mandalay, Maung Maung Gyi found himself a catalyst in the conflagration. The city of Mandalay was curfewed and two provocateurs, a Shwe Pe and Shwe Sin, were put on trial behind closed doors. Photographs of the accused were forbidden; however, Maung Maung managed to view the court proceedings accompanying a Burmese reporter and memorized the faces of the accused and then sent their portraits to the newspapers where they were printed. According to Nyan Shein, “the massacre spread through the whole of Burma… Therefore the British had to curfew the whole country.” These events are difficult to corroborate, but Cady in his A History of Modern Burma mentions anti-Indian riots occurring throughout Burma in 1938.

Another notorious incident involving Maung Maung Gyi is a quarrel that he had with one of his superior British officers in the agricultural department, alleging punching the man and subsequently quitting his job as an agricultural officer for good. This event may have occurred prior to the incidents of the Indian-Burmese riots above, attributed to the year 1938, for in the following year, 1939, when the State School of Art and Music opened up, he became an instructor there. This was a prestigious position. The principal of the school was San Win, and to other painters of note, Ba Kyi and Maung Maung Mya, were teachers at the school.

== Works ==
Maung Maung Gyi is known to have owned a large collection of paintings, but whether these paintings were strictly his own works or included works which he had collected by other painters in Burma is not known. In any event, during World War II, his house burned down and his entire collection was lost.

Not many works by Maung Maung Gyi have survived. Four of his watercolors are currently in the collection of the Pitt Rivers Museum, Oxford. A fifth painting appears on page 13 of Old Myanmar Paintings in the Collection of U Win (2006) by Hla Tin Htun, and it is said that the National Museum of Myanmar owns a painting or paintings by Maung Maung Gyi but if so, the work has not been on display in recent years.

== Influences and legacy ==
Although Maung Maung Gyi is said to have studied art in England, his greater influences in painting may actually have come through exposure to British painters whom he personally encountered in Burma or whose works he saw there. In particular, one British painter who may have influenced him is B.H. Wiles, who published reproductions of his paintings of Burma in India and England. B.H. Wiles work has appeared in Christie’s auctions in recent years but with little biographical information about him beyond the fact that he was a 19th and 20th century painter. One account of Maung Maung Gyi’s life records that he was a companion painter of B.H. Wiles when Wiles painted in Burma. This account also maintains that Maung Maung Gyi’s paintings were marketed in Germany.

Maung Maung Gyi’s work also shows irrefutable influence of Robert Talbot Kelly, the British painter who traveled throughout Burma in the early 1900s, producing a large tome of his collected scenes of Burma in his book Burma, Painted and Described (1905). One of the four paintings in the Pitt Rivers Museum collection done by Maung Maiung Gyi is an exact replica of a painting entitled Express Steamer Passing Sagaing on page 146 of Talbot Kelly’s book. This is not to suggest by any means that Maung Maung Gyi had a habit of copying works from other painters; rather, as many painters of both the Traditional and Western Schools did in Burma in the early days, he copied the works of painters he admired in order to learn.

Maung Maung Gyi is said to have influenced and been influenced by the early artist of the Traditional School, Saya Aye. After returning from England, Maung Maung Gyi is said to have given Saya Aye instruction in Western painting in exchange for instruction in Traditional art. However, evidence of Traditional techniques hardly exists in Maung Maung Gyi’s work, and while Maung Maung Gyi may have left an influence on Saya Aye in his Western-style works, it is clear from a painting dated 1909 by Saya Aye, entitled Burmese Gentleman and Wife, now in the collection of the Fukuoka Asian Art Museum, that Saya Aye must have already made large steps on his own to learn Western techniques before meeting Maung Maung Gyi.

Maung Maung Gyi’s influence in Burma was largely as a watercolor painter who traveled about Burma capturing its scenes in the plein air style. The plein air mode of painting later became very common among Upper Burma painters such as Saya Saung and Ba Thet in his early works.

== Death ==
In his last years, Maung Maung Gyi acquired heart disease. He died in a small village in Upper Burma. His son, Kin Maung (Yangon)—not to be confused with Kin Maung (Bank)—also became a well-known painter in Burma.

== Museum Collections ==
- Pitt Rivers Museum, Oxford

== See also ==
- Saya Aye (painter)
- Robert Talbot Kelly
