= Richard Talbot Kelly =

British army officer and painter (1896–1971)

Richard Talbot Kelly MBE, MC, RI
- Born: 20 August 1896; Birkenhead
- Died: 30 March 1971 (aged 74); Leicester
- Other names: T.K.
- Alma mater: Rugby School; Royal Military Academy, Woolwich
- Occupation: Painter, officer
- Parent(s): Robert Talbot Kelly
- Awards: Member of the Order of the British Empire; Military Cross (1917)
- Rank: sub-lieutenant, captain, major

Richard Barrett Talbot Kelly MBE, MC, RI, (20 August 1896 – 30 March 1971), known to friends and colleagues as 'TK', was a British army officer, school teacher, and artist, known especially for his watercolour paintings of ornithological subjects.

== Early life ==
Talbot Kelly was born in Birkenhead, then part of Cheshire, England, on 20 August 1896. He was the only son of Lilias Fisher Kelly and Robert Talbot Kelly. His father was also a successful artist, as was his paternal grandfather, the Irish landscape and portrait painter, Robert George Kelly. The family lived in Rochdale, which was then in Lancashire, but moved to London when Talbot Kelly was six. He was educated at The Hall School, Hampstead, followed by a boarding school in Rottingdean, then Rugby School and finally the Royal Military Academy, Woolwich.

== Military career ==
Talbot Kelly was commissioned as a second lieutenant with the Royal Horse Artillery on 22 April 1915. He served as a Forward Observation Officer with the 9th (Scottish) Division, 52nd Brigade, Royal Field Artillery, in France, from May 1915 until January 1917. He saw combat in the Battle of Loos (1915), the Battle of the Somme (1916) and the Battle of Arras (1917).

He subsequently served in an Army Field Artillery Brigade, and was awarded the Military Cross in June 1917. He was wounded by the blast from a shell at the Battle of Passchendaele on 5 August 1917. After convalescing at home, he returned to France in April 1918, then taught camouflage at the School of Artillery in Larkhill. He successfully requested a transfer to the Royal Flying Corps, but before he could undertake pilot training, the war came to an end.

After the war, he remained with the military, serving in the Royal Artillery in India. Having married Dorothy Bundy (daughter of the Pre-Raphaelite painter Edgar Bundy) in 1924, he was discharged from the army in 1929.

In 1939, on the outbreak of World War II, he received his army recall (service number 14791), and was Chief Instructor at the War Office Camouflage Development and Training Centre in Farnham for the duration of the war. He was made a Brevet Major on 3 August 1942, a rank he retained until discharge. For his work at Farnham he was appointed, in the 1944 New Year Honours, a Member of the Order of the British Empire (MBE). At that time he was also credited with the rank of Temporary Major.

His memoir, A Subaltern's Odyssey: Memoirs of the Great War, 1915–1917, was published posthumously in 1980.

== Civilian career ==
After the First World War, Talbot Kelly began to exhibit his bird paintings. In 1925, he was elected to the Royal Institute of Painters in Water Colours.

Upon leaving the army in 1929, Talbot Kelly was appointed Director of Art at his alma mater, Rugby School and, during the 1930s began to publish books of his paintings.

He exhibited at the Royal Academy, the Royal Institute of Painters in Water Colours and the Paris Salon.

He painted posters for British Rail, London Underground, and London Transport.

He was engaged as the design consultant for the Pavilion of Natural Science at the 1951 Festival of Britain.

He was a founder-member, in 1964, of the Society of Wildlife Artists.

While at Rugby, he also worked in museums, curating the natural history collections of Warwick Museum and the National History Museum of Uganda. He retired from teaching in 1966.

In retirement, he worked as a volunteer curator in his new home town of Leicester, and as a book illustrator.

== Death and legacy ==
Talbot Kelly died at his home in Leicester on 30 March 1971, at the age of seventy-four.

A number of his watercolours from the Western Front are in the collection of the United Kingdom's National Army Museum. His painting "Young Lapwing" is in the Ulster Museum. A copy of his 1927 poster for the Underground Electric Railways Company of London, "Zoo: Common and Spiny Lobster", is in the collection of the Art Institute of Chicago. A copy of his poster for British Railways, "Norfolk – Heron & Bearded Tits", and one of his 1960 London Transport poster "When did you last see your Ravens?" are in the Science Museum, London.

His daughter is the ornithological artist Chloe Elizabeth Talbot Kelly, like her father a founder member of the Society of Wildlife Artists. His son Richard Giles Talbot Kelly (1929–2006) was also an artist.

Previewing a 2015 World Land Trust Art Gallery exhibition which included his work, Nikki Hawes wrote of Talbot Kelly:

Familiarity with his subjects, which included both insight and understanding, was the key to Talbot Kelly's work. His ability to exclude what he knew to be the facts and concentrate on what he had seen puts his work into the highest category of bird painting.

== Publications ==
- The Way of Birds. Collins. 1937.
- Paper Birds. Puffin. 1947.
- Mountain And Moorland Birds (Puffin Picture Books, Number 65). Puffin. 1947.
- Bird Life and the Painter. Studio Publications. 1955.
- A Subaltern's Odyssey. A memoir of the Great War 1915–1917. Kimber. 1980.

=== Illustrated by Talbot Kelly ===
- Lockley, R. M. (1945). Birds of the Sea: King Penguin No. 24. Penguin.
- Clive, Simson (1966). A Bird Overhead. H.F. & G. Witherby Ltd.
