= Saya Chone =

Burmese painter

- Born: 1866
- Died: 1917 (aged 50–51)
- Known for: Painting
- Movement: Traditional Burmese painting

Saya Chone (Burmese: ဆရာချုံ, 1866–1917) was a prominent Burmese painter based in Mandalay, Myanmar. He served as a royal court painter during the reign of King Thibaw Min, the last monarch of the Konbaung dynasty. After the British annexation of Upper Burma in 1886, he created many works depicting Burmese palace life.

== Early life ==
Saya Chone’s exact date of birth is unknown, though estimates place it around 1228 ME (1866 CE). He was born in Mandalay during the rebellion of the Myingun and Myingondaing princes against King Mindon. His birth name was Maung Ya Chon, later changed to Maung San Chon, and finally shortened to Maung Chon. He studied Buddhist scriptures such as the Mangala Sutta, Ratana Shwe Cho, and Paritta Gyi at a monastery, where he also developed a passion for drawing and painting.

He began as an apprentice in ceremonial painting, learning tasks such as preparing bamboo scaffolding and applying base coats. At age 14 he was sent to study under Saya Sar, son of the royal painter U Gya Nyunt. When Saya Sar retired due to blindness, Chone succeeded him as a royal painter at the age of 16.

== Career ==
As a royal painter, Saya Chone produced works for the palace, including portraits of the royal family, court officials, and senior monks, as well as murals and scroll paintings illustrating Buddhist Jataka tales and royal ceremonies. His works, such as The Royal Court Session and A Scene from Inside the Palace, display traditional Burmese line work alongside Western perspective techniques.

He documented a wide range of royal regalia, processions, architectural features, hairstyles, ceremonial costumes, mythical beings, and symbolic animals, often by copying from official illustrated royal handbooks. These served as reference materials for palace artists. He also produced paintings of royal barges, ceremonial elephants and horses, and various instruments used in court rituals.

During his career, Chone worked during a transitional period in Burmese art, when scroll painting began to replace murals and artists were organized into ranked positions in the royal court. His use of perspective reflected a stylistic development in court painting during the late Konbaung period.

== Later life ==
Following the fall of King Thibaw in 1885, Saya Chone continued to work as an artist under British colonial rule, painting portraits, landscapes, Jataka tales, and scenes of palace life. Around 1890, he began displaying and selling paintings at public events, a practice regarded as one of the earliest solo exhibitions in Myanmar.

He later lived in Ma Let To village in Maubin Township, painting for monasteries and donors, before moving to Yangon in 1911. In Yangon, he initially struggled to find patrons for traditional Burmese painting and turned to painting signs, film posters, and advertisements, notably for the Tiger Brand paint company. His work in commercial art became well known for its depictions of tigers and elephants.

Aside from painting, Saya Chone practiced alchemy, created sculptures of deities and mythical beings, and collaborated with artisans in Mandalay and the Irrawaddy Delta.

== Students and influence ==
Notable students included U Ba Sein, U Ba Zaw, and U Aung Myat Kyaw. They learned both traditional Burmese painting techniques and skills for commercial art from him. Through his teaching and artworks, Saya Chone preserved many aspects of Burmese court art traditions.

== Death ==
Saya Chone died in 1278 ME (1918 CE) at the age of 50 in Yangon. Over his 34-year career, he worked in painting, sculpture, relief, and decorative arts, and is regarded as one of the last Burmese court painters.

== Gallery ==
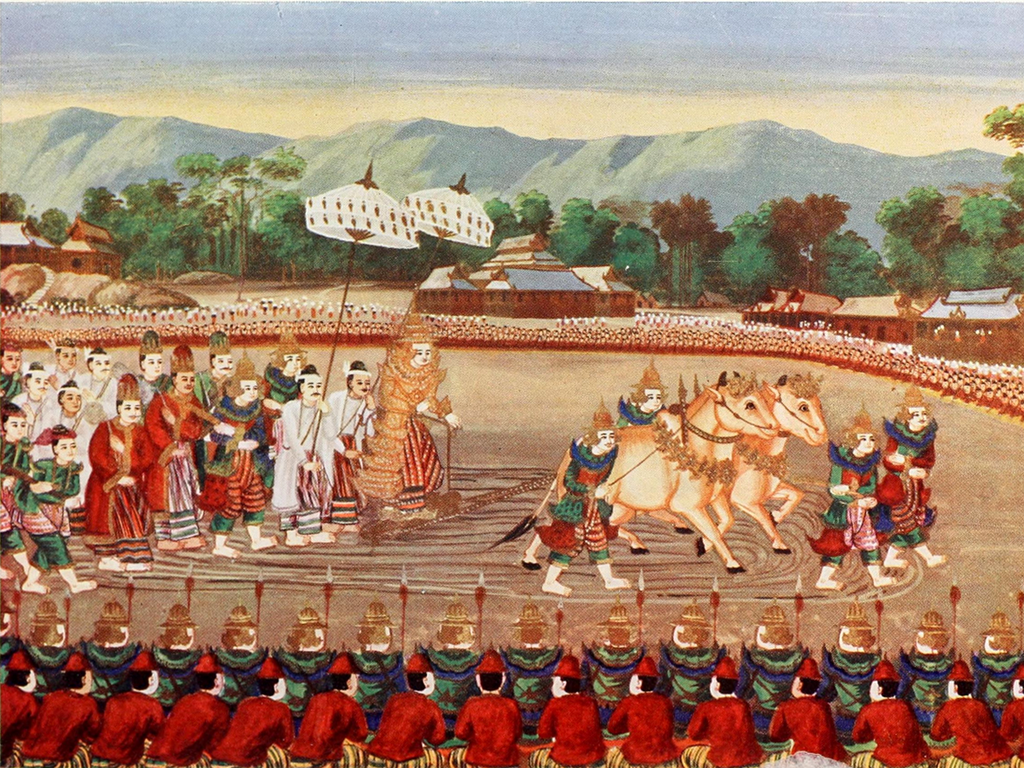
Royal ploughing ceremony

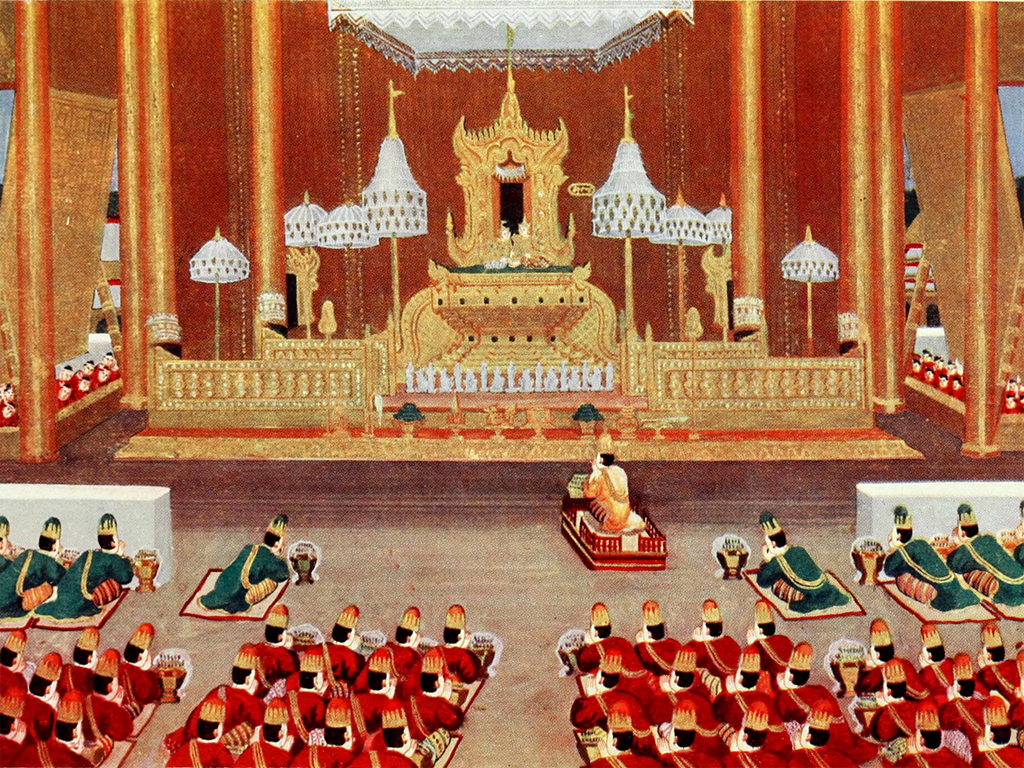
Royal audience

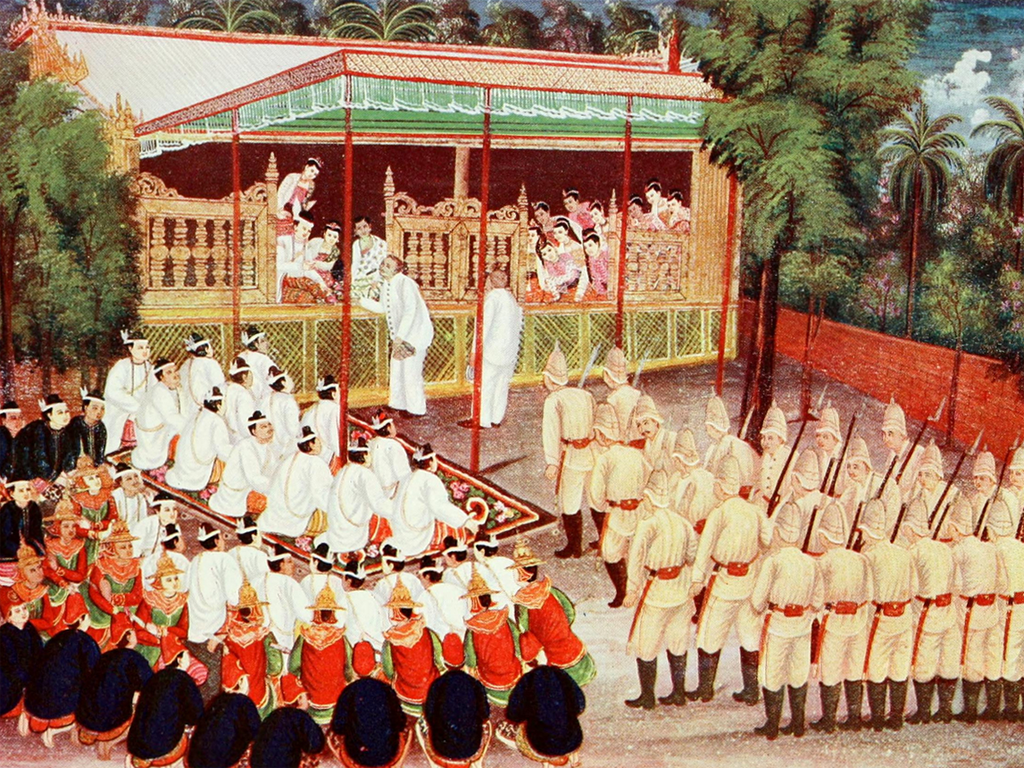
Abdictation of King Thibaw

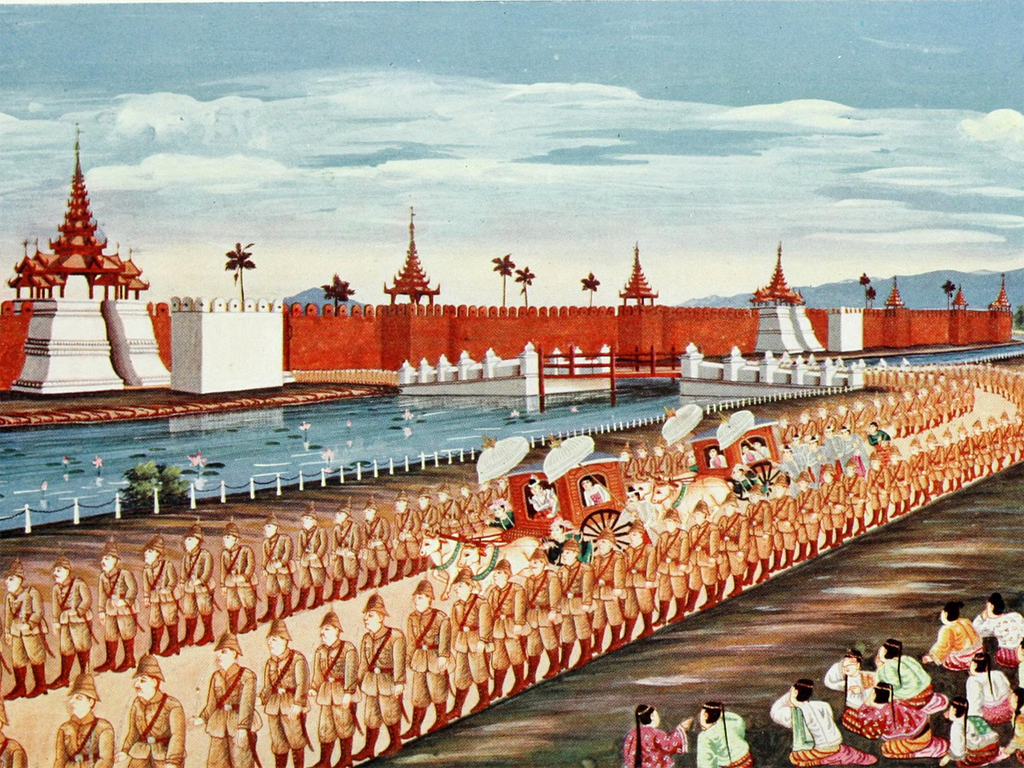
King Thibaw leaving Mandalay

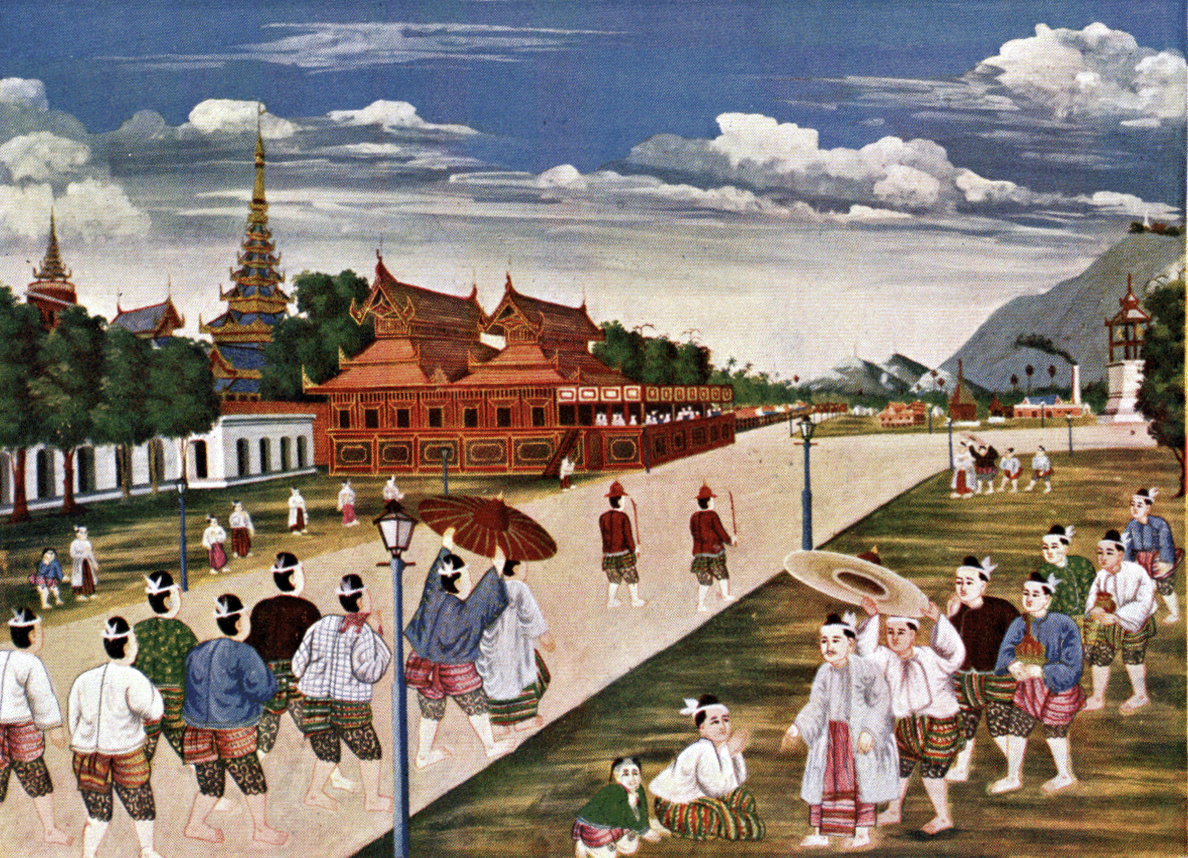
Painting of Mandalay Palace gardens

== See also ==
- Burmese art
