= Monastic education =

Buddhist monastic education system

The Buddhist monastic education system facilitates basic educational needs of the Asian Buddhist countries before the contemporary era. Learning traditions can be traced back to ancient India where learning began with educated monastics, teaching younger monks and the lay people. The monastic instruction was based on Buddhist value system and emphasized that learning was an end in itself, one that is "worth a strenuous pursuit to possess for its own sake" and that "teaching was for ends that were above mere gain".

== System ==
The education system that emerged, particularly from 320 BCE to 500 CE, featured an open framework where learning was free for all including non-Buddhists. The monks used their temples to teach and since these were not enough to address the educational needs of the entire country, learning centers were also built in connection with the monasteries. There were also convents and monasteries offering opportunities for learning and self-culture that catered to women since they were also seen as equal to men, supplementing their work in the spread of their faith.

Monastic education in other countries was heavily influenced by the Indian tradition such as the case of Sri Lanka where the sutra sannayas was heavily used in preaching, serving as one of the foundations of the Lankan monastic education. The formal monastic education introduced in Bhutan in 1621 was also patterned after the ancient Indian system. These developments show an absence of a standardized monastic education system although there were initiatives that sought to establish a curriculum such as those by the Saranamkara and his students, which stressed the importance of grammar and composition.

Nowadays, countries like Myanmar, Thailand, Cambodia, and Laos still practice Buddhist monastic education to fill the gap in the government education system. There are cases, however, when large Buddhist education centers were nationalized within governmental efforts to expand higher education facilities. Some scholars criticized this, citing the destruction of traditional Buddhist education and the politicization of Buddhist monkhood.

== See also ==
- Pali Canon
- Pariyatti
- List of Sāsana Azani recipients
- Buddhist Institute (Cambodia)
- Champasak Sangha College (Laos)
- Myanmar Monastic Schools
- Monastic examinations (Myanmar)
- Pirivena, monastic colleges in Sri Lanka
- Sanam Luang Dhamma Studies (Thailand)
- Tipitakadhara Tipitakakovida Selection Examinations
- Phaungdawoo Monastic Education High School
