= List of Burmese visual artists =

Following is a partial list of Burmese visual artists, including painters, sculptors and photographers.

| Name | Born | Died | Medium |
|---|---|---|---|
| Aikimay | 1977 | | Painter |
| Aung Aung Taik | 1948 | | Painter |
| Aung Khin | 1921 | 1996 | Painter |
| Aung Min Min | 1953 | | Painter |
| Aung Myint | 1946 | | Painter |
| Ba Gyan | 1902 | 1953 | Cartoonist |
| Bagyi Aung Soe | 1924 | 1990 | Painter |
| Ba Kyi | 1912 | 2000 | Painter |
| Ba Nyan | 1897 | 1945 | Painter |
| Bart Was Not Here | 1996 | | Visual Artist |
| Bogalay Kyaw Hlaing | 1914 | | Painter |
| Chan Aye | 1954 | | Painter |
| Di Pa | 1950 | | Painter |
| Gon Yee | 2001 | | Painter |
| Hla Myint Swe | 1948 | | Ink drawing, photography |
| Htein Lin | 1966 | | Painter and performance artist |
| Kan Chun | 1946 | 2009 | Painter |
| Khin Win Kyi | 1952 | | Painter |
| Kin Maung | 1910 | 1983 | Painter |
| Ko Ko Naing (painter) | 1971 | | Painter |
| Kyaw Nyo | 1980 | | Painter |
| K Kyaw | 1967 | | Painter |
| Ko Kyin | 1944 | | Painter |
| Kyaw Ohn | 1945 | | Painter |
| Lun Gywe | 1930 | 2025 | Painter |
| Lu Tin | 1930 | 2014 | Watercolor |
| Min Wae Aung | 1960 | | Painter |
| MPP Yei Myint | 1953 | | Painter, drawings, collage |
| Min Zaw | 1972 | | Painter, collage, Cartoonists |
| Artist Myint Naing | 1967 | | Watercolour Artist |
| Myint Swe | 1951 | | Painter |
| Ngwe Gaing | 1901 | 1967 | Painter |
| Nyein Chan Su | 1973 | | Painter |
| Nyo Mhaing | 1950 | | Painter |
| Nan Da | 1983 | | Painter |
| Nann Nann | 1974 | | Painter |
| Nan Da | 1983 | | Painter |
| Paw Oo Thett | 1936 | 1993 | Painter |
| Po Po | 1957 | | Installation |
| Phyu Mon | 1960 | | Painter |
| San Hlaing | 1923 | 2015 | Painter, Visual artist |
| San Win | 1905 | 1981 | Painter |
| Saw Maung | 1900 | 1969 | Painter |
| Shane Tun | 1925 | | Painter |
| Sitt Nyein Aye | 1956 | | Painter |
| Than Myint Aung | 1965 | 2010 | Painter |
| Than Win Tun | 1948 | | Painter |
| The Maw Naing | 1971 | | Painter |
| Tynt Naing | 1950 | | Painter |
| Thu Shyan | 2005 | | Multidisciplinary Artist |
| Wah Nu | 1977 | | Painter, video |
| Wathone | 1947 | 2008 | Painter |
| Win Pe | 1935 | | Painter, filmmaker, writer |
| Win Pe Myint | 1936 | | Painter |
| Zaw Win Pe | 1960 | | Painter |
