= Art of Myanmar =

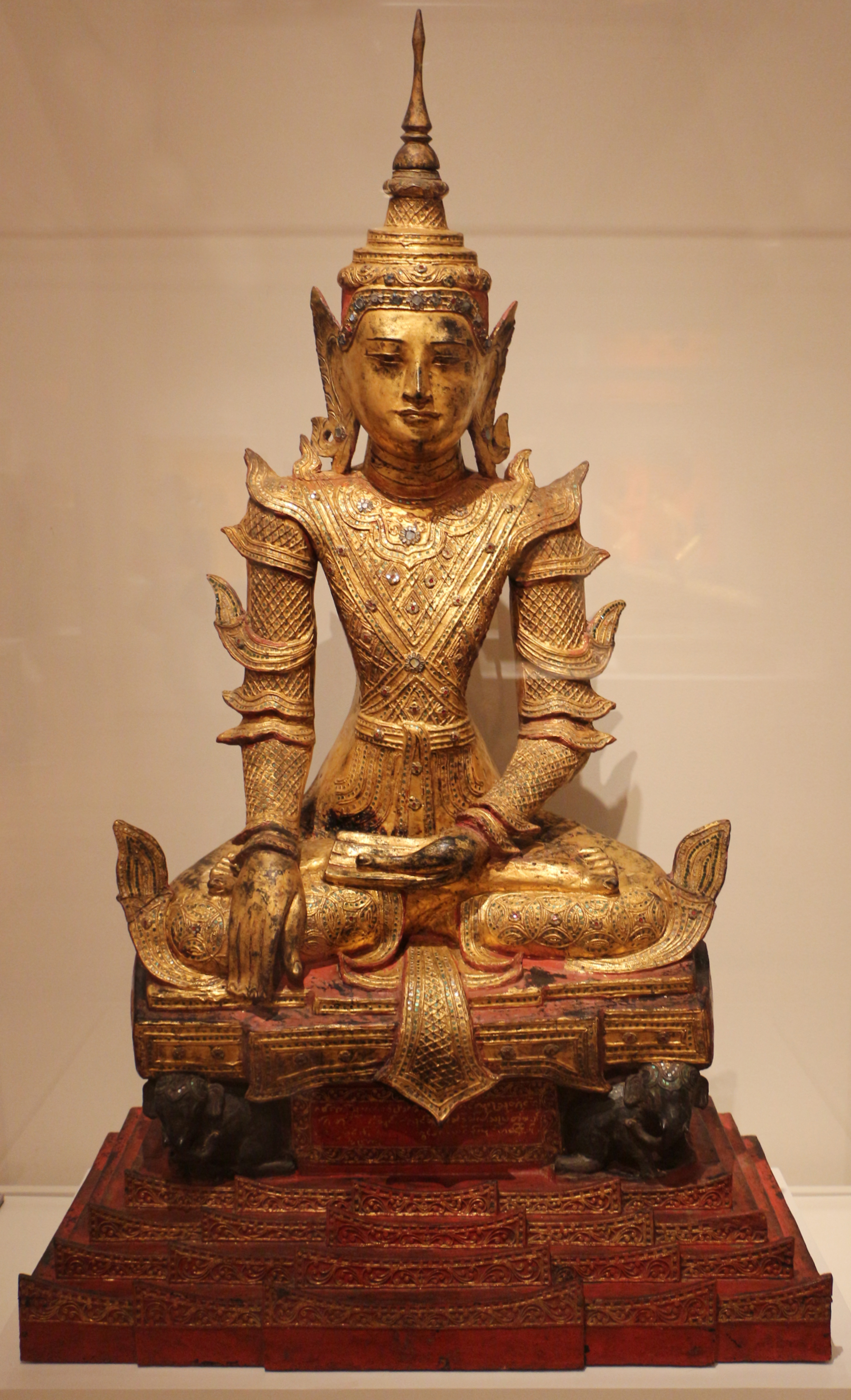
Crowned and jeweled Buddha sitting on an elephant throne; circa 1890; Art Institute of Chicago (USA)

Art of Myanmar refers to visual art created in Myanmar (Burma). Ancient Burmese art was influenced by India and China, and was often religious in nature, ranging from Hindu sculptures in the Thaton Kingdom to Theravada Buddhist images in the Sri Ksetra Kingdom. The Bagan period saw significant developments in many art forms, from wall paintings and sculptures to stucco and wood carving. After a dearth of surviving art between the 14th and 16th centuries, artists created paintings and sculptures that reflect Burmese culture. Burmese artists have been subjected to government interference and censorship, hindering the development of art in Myanmar. Burmese art reflects the central Buddhist elements including the mudra, Jataka tales, the pagoda, and Bodhisattva. Throughout Burmese history, religious art or the royal court were the source of virtually all of Myanmar's visual arts.

== Pyu and Mon period ==
Trade with India during the Pyu period brought deep cultural contacts heavily influencing many aspects of visual culture in Myanmar. However, scholarship and archaeology on Pyu, Mon and Dvaravati art in neighbouring Thailand were biased by colonial attitudes in the 20th century, placing a greater emphasis on comparisons to well-documented Gupta art. The three cultures, traditionally divided by differences in artistic styles, actually share many similarities and evidence of cross-cultural influences within their art.

Nonetheless, contact with India brought Theravada Buddhism to the Pyu city states in the 6th century, most notably in Sri Ksetra. Early Sri Ksetra religious art was influenced by Southeast India and later Southwest India. By the 9th century, there were notable influences from the Nanzhao Kingdom. Other Pyu city-states remained a mix of Ari Buddhist and Mahayana Buddhist with greater influences from Nanzhao through the migration of Mranma people. In Hanlin, Buddha statues were crowned Buddhas differing from Sri Ksetra by lacking an urna on the forehead, indicating less Indian influence.

The Thaton Kingdom and the Mon to the south of the Pyu also exhibited Indian influences in their art. The Mon from this time mainly used alabaster, stone or bronze depicted with the Bhūmisparśa mudra. Mon Buddha images are distinguished from Burmese or Pyu images by the length of the fingers in the mudra. Some of the few pieces of Thaton art dating before the Bagan Kingdom are Hindu showing Vishnu with a tripartite lotus showing the Trimurti (Brahma, Vishnu and Shiva) a configuration unique to Pyu art.

== Bagan Period ==
There is significantly more extant art from the Bagan Kingdom onwards. Most notable are the wall paintings and statues decorating the interior of temples in Bagan. The murals of the Bagan period were painted on a dry surface, as opposed to frescos utilizing wet cement. The wall paintings were often captioned in Pali, Old Mon or Old Burmese and typically depicted the Jataka Tales. Many temples also featured ceiling paintings, which were usually patterns. The lotus was a common motif in ceiling art for its symbolic connection with purity in Buddhist art.

Sculpture was also very prominent in the period. Buddha images for the purpose of worship within temples. Buddha images of the period are distinct for their round face, short urnas and strict expressions. Many surviving statues are made of bronze, iron or sandstone. Other scenes from Buddhist folklore, like the birth of the Buddha, were common subjects for statues and reliefs. Furthermore, many bronze sculptures depicted Parvati, the consort of the Hindu god Shiva, as she was regarded as an important deva in Bagan.

Exteriors of Bagan temples also featured intricate stucco work and reliefs depicting various Buddhist scenes. The art of wooden sculpture also developed in this period with a few surviving pieces being incorporated into the doors of Bagan temples.

During this period, ten traditional arts, called pan sè myo (ပန်းဆယ်မျိုး, lit. 'Ten Flowers'), were established within the culture. The ten arts are as follows: Lacquerware is also a distinct craft originating from the late Bagan period with the earliest fragments of basketry in Bagan being dated to the 13th century.

1. Blacksmith (ပန်းပဲ ba-bè)
2. Woodcarving (ပန်းပု ba-bu)
3. Goldsmith (ပန်းထိမ် ba-dein)
4. Stucco relief (ပန်းတော့ pandaw)
5. Masonry (ပန်းရန် pa-yan)
6. Stone carving (ပန်းတမော့ pantamaw)
7. Turnery (ပန်းပွတ် panbut)
8. Painting (ပန်းချီ bagyi)
9. Lacquerware (ပန်းယွန်း panyun)
10. Bronze casting (ပန်းတဉ်း badin)
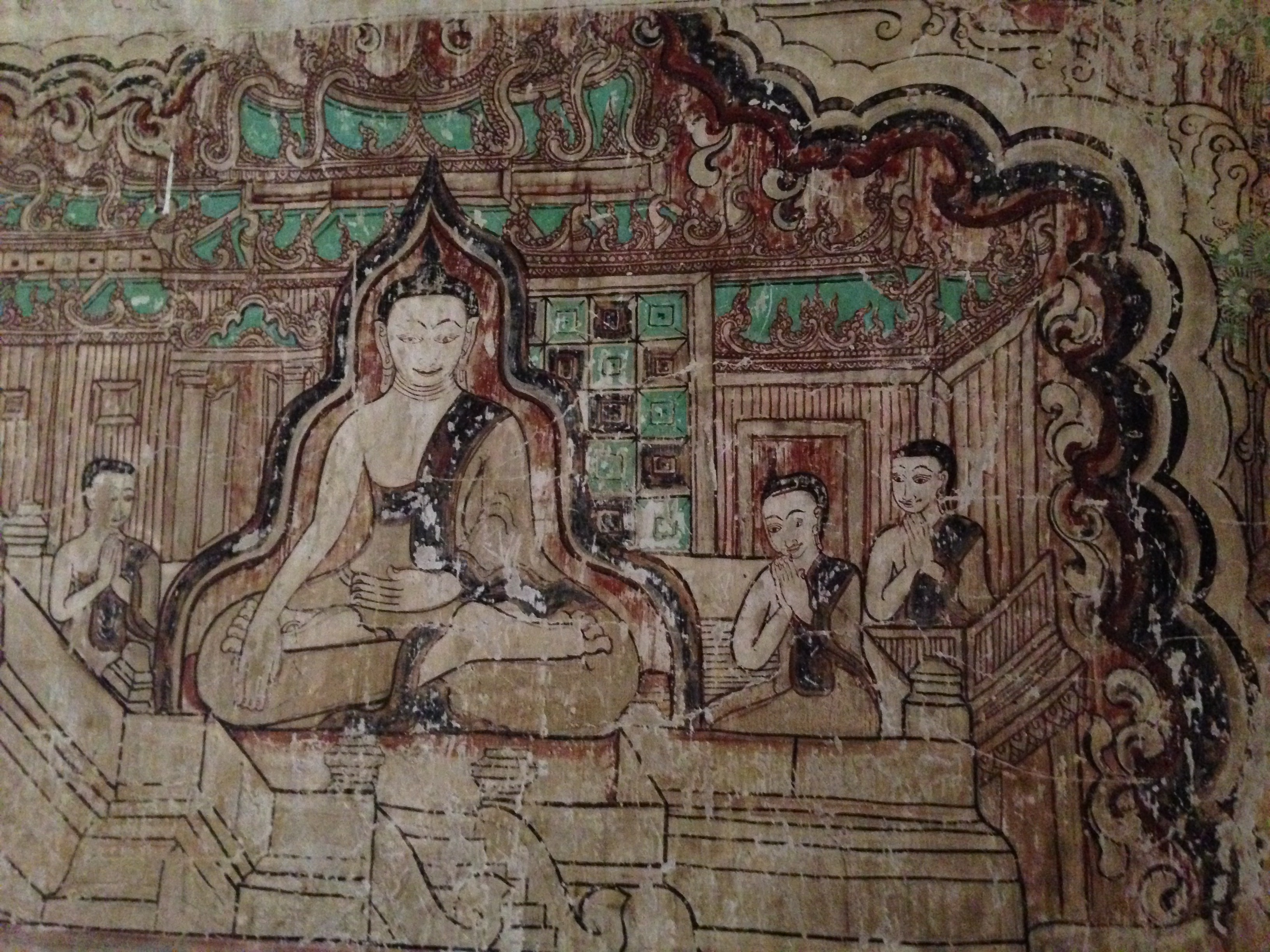
Awakening of Buddha Taṇhaṅkara, Wall Painting in Upali Thein Temple, Bagan

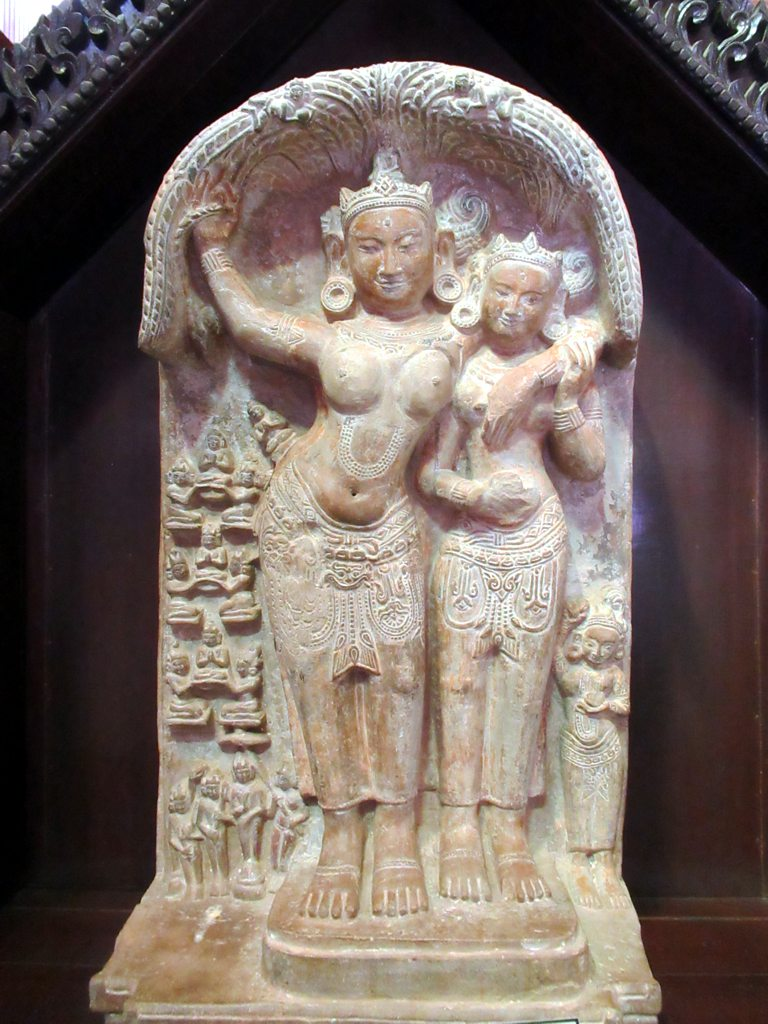
The Birth of Buddha, 12th-century statue, Bagan

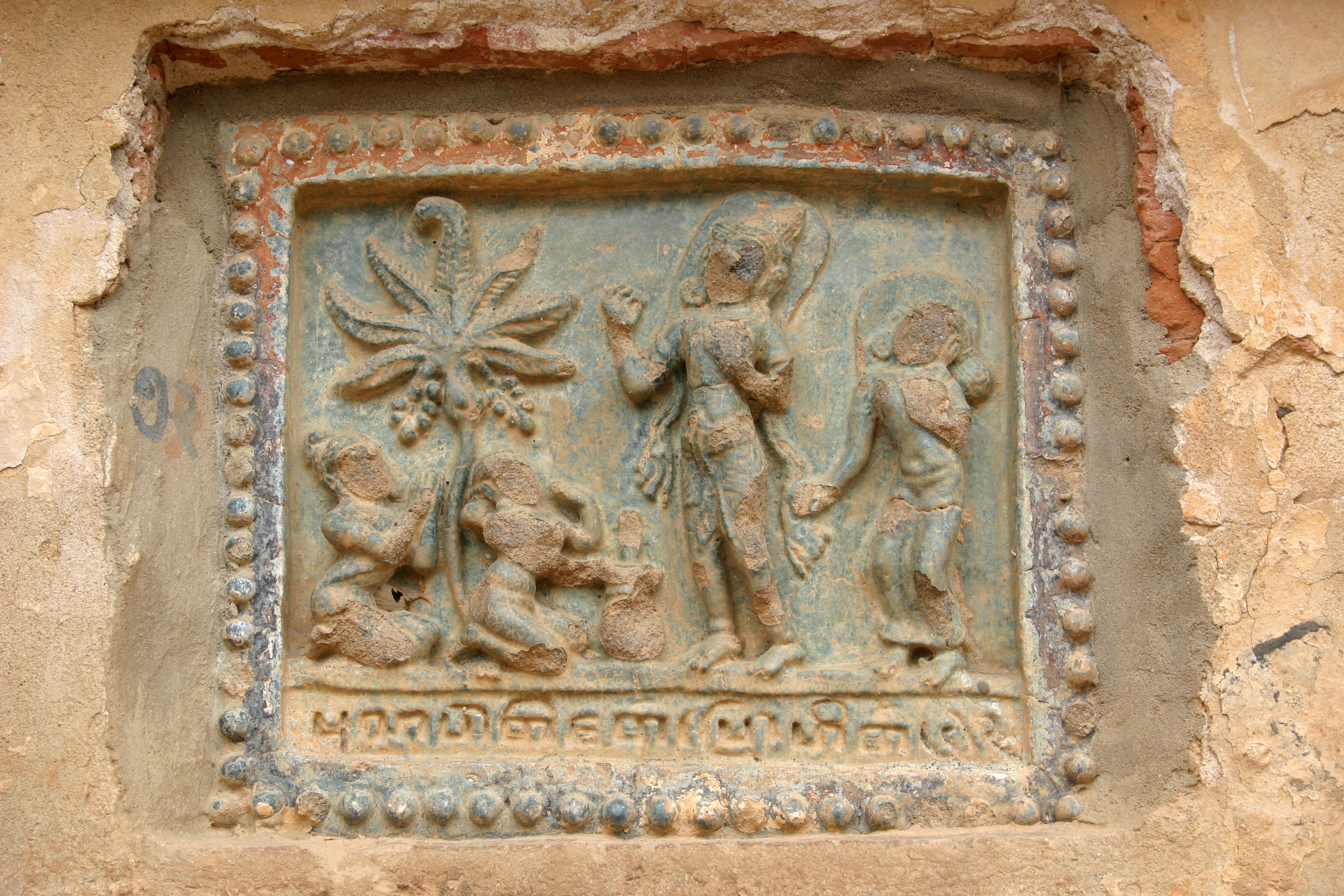
Stucco Mid-Relief on Mingalazedi Pagdoa, Bagan

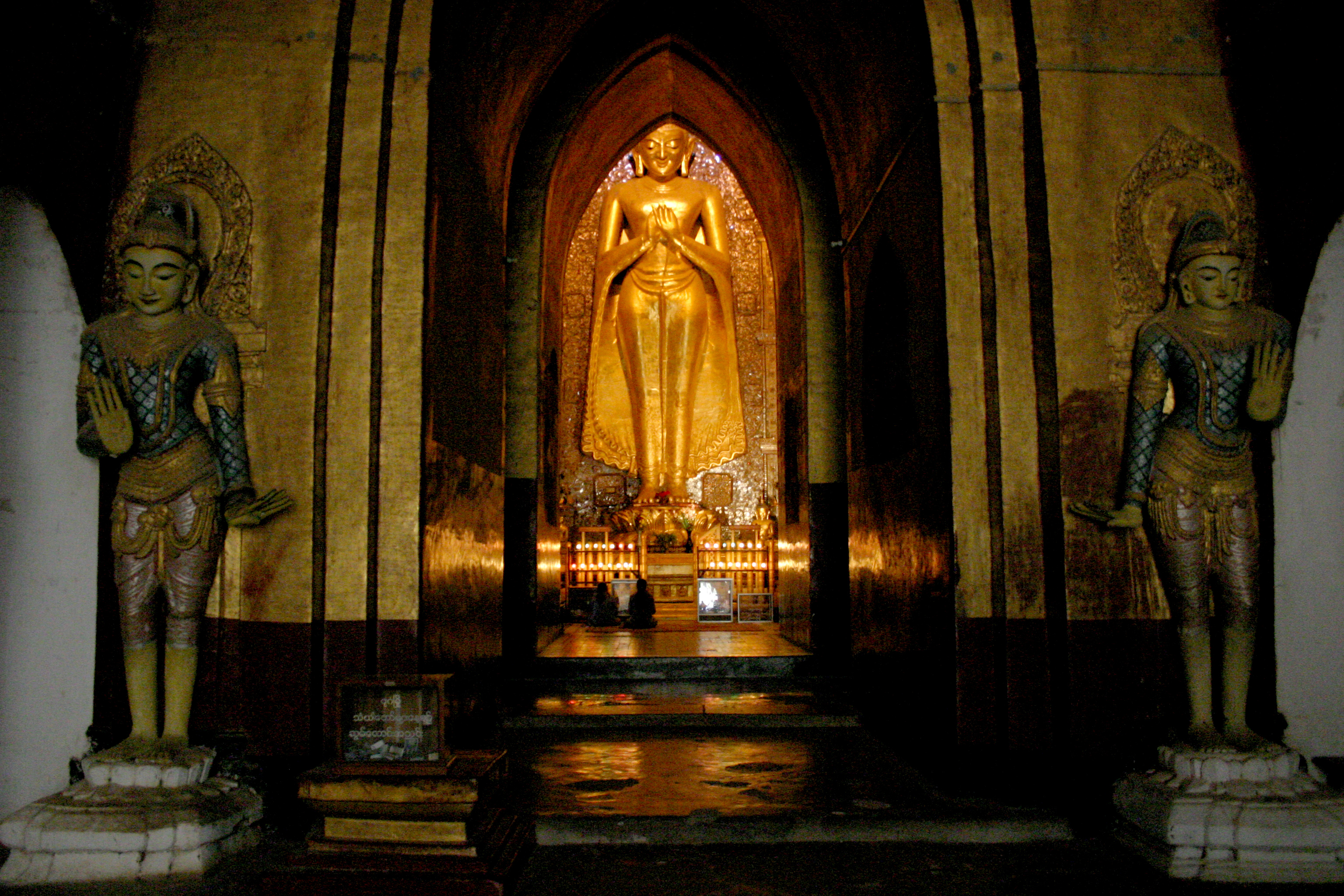
Buddha statue in Ananda Temple, Bagan

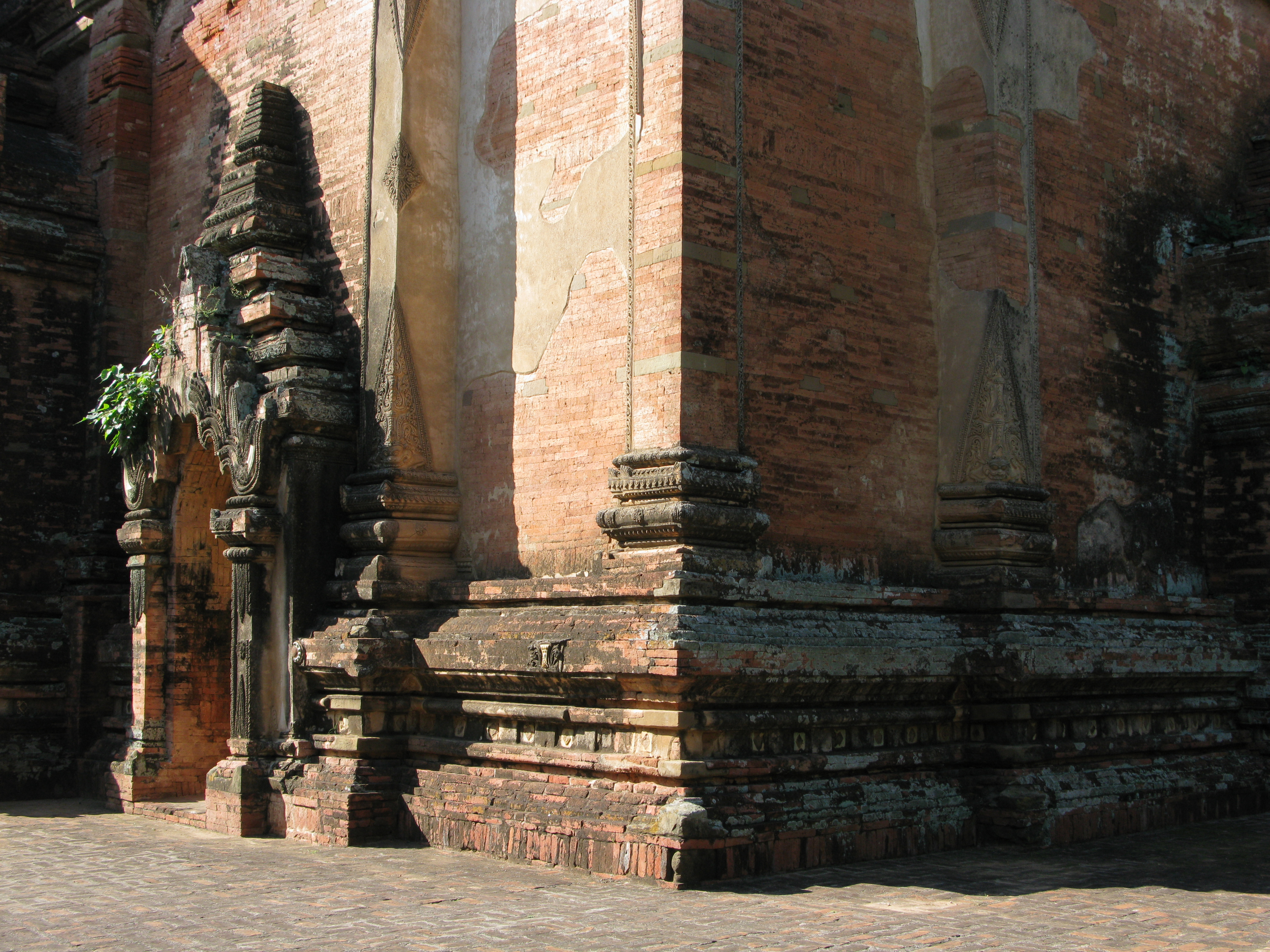
Stucco on facade of Htilominlo Temple

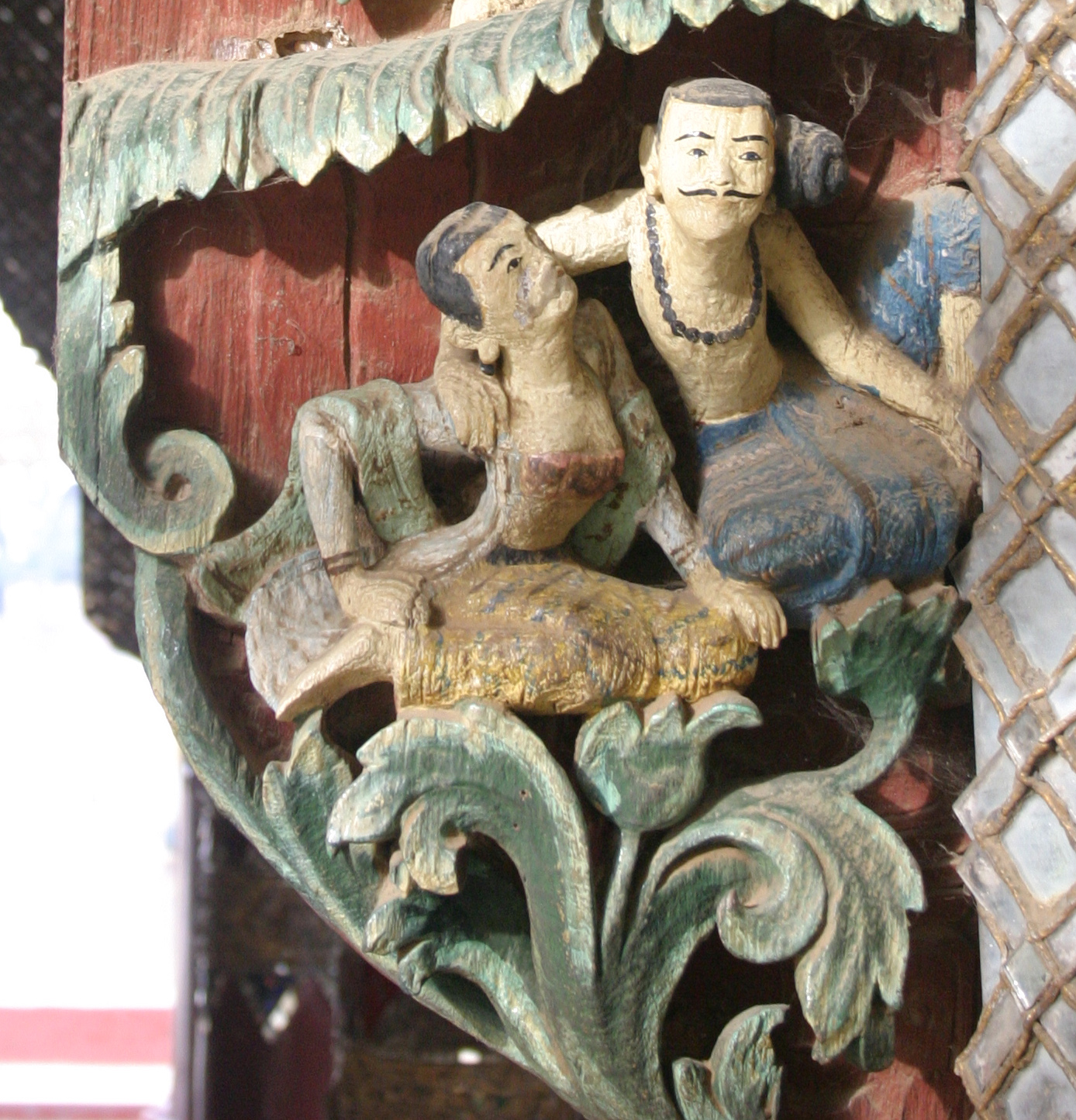
Surviving Wood carvings on Shwezigon Pagoda, Bagan

== Taungoo and Ava periods ==
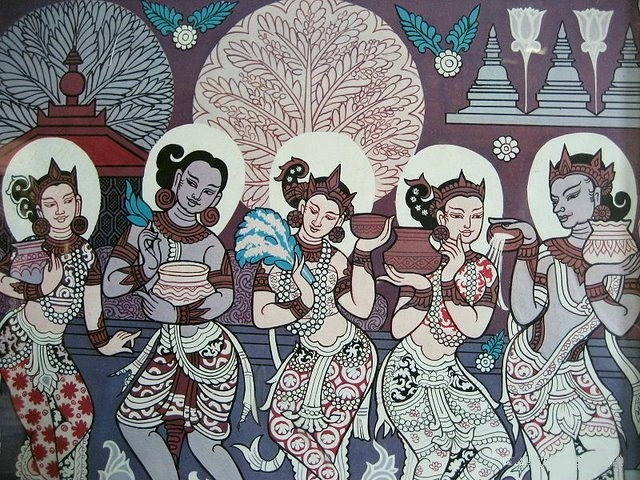
Bagan-style painting of Thingyan in Bagan

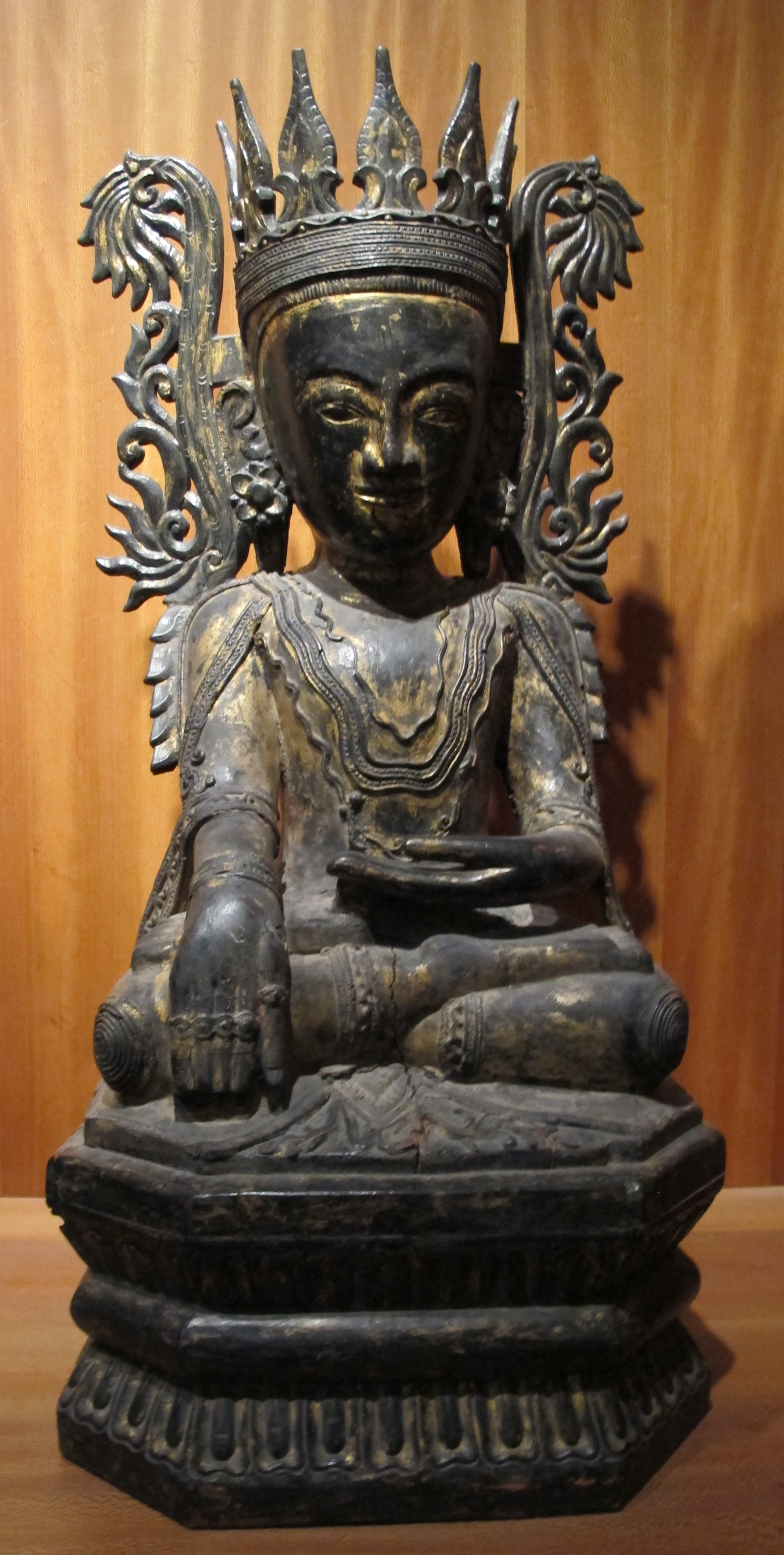
Crowned Buddha image of unknown origin with Shan influences

After the Mongol invasions of Burma and the subsequent decline of Bagan as a cultural center led to three centuries of warfare and internal division. Art produced in the rise of Burmese kingdoms was often plundered, destroyed or burnt especially when rival kingdoms came to surpass them in power. There is, therefore, significantly less art from the 14th to 16th centuries.

Bayinnaung's conquest and subjugation in 1555–1562 of Manipur, Bhamo, Zinme (Chiang Mai), Linzin (Lan Xang), and up the Taping and Shweli rivers in the direction of Yunnan brought back large numbers of skilled craftsmen into Burma. It is thought that the finer sort of Burmese lacquerware, called Yun, was introduced during this period by imported artisans belonging to the Yun or Laos Shan tribes of the Chiang Mai region. Having reunited the various Burmese polities, Bayinnaung built the Kanbawzathadi Palace incorporating gold plates into traditional Burmese architecture. Visitors recorded the palace as being magnificent and splendourous. Art from this period began to see more Shan and Mon influences. Buddha statues from both the Kingdom of Ava and the Taungoo period have larger heads and lotus-petal shaped halos.

After the collapse of the empire and the restoration of the Taungoo Kingdom, the capital was moved back to Ava with many referring to this period as the Ava period. This period is not to be confused with the Kingdom of Ava two centuries prior. Buddha images from this period are distinct for their large forehead and oval-shaped faces. Sculptors also began to work with marble and developed a style where the eyes looked down instead of outwards. Paintings in this period, like those found in the Oke Kyaung Monastery in Bagan, continued the religious theme and subject matter of the Bagan period. However, Ava period paintings gave the settings local contexts like contemporary hair styles and depicted more ordinary activities like fishing. Paintings from this era also saw the use of blues and turquoise pigments creating more vivid images. Sumptuary laws from this period restrict the use of ivory, gold and silver by rank, which played a part in a relative lack of art that survived from this period.

=== Arakan art ===
The Kingdom of Arakan established in the 15th century brought artisans from the Bengal Sultanate and had deep trade and cultural connections to South Asia. The cities of Mrauk U, Dhanyawadi and Waithali had stone sculptures and inscriptions dating between the 6th and 16th centuries. Visitors to the Arakanese court noted the textile splendours and the high respected positions of Weavers within Arakan.

Buddha images from Arakan are more square and angled. When the images are crowned, they have a shorter crown wing. One famous piece of Arakan art is the Mahamuni Image. According to legend, it was carved in Dhanyawadi during a visit from Gautama Buddha. Historically, the image has existed at least since the 11th century when King Anawrahta unsuccessfully attempted to move the image to Bagan. The image was later captured by the Konbaung dynasty and moved to the Mahamuni Buddha Temple in Amarapura in 1784.

=== Shan art ===
Art historians do not have an agreed-upon definition of Shan art, though it generally involves art from the historical and modern-day Shan State. It is believed to have originated between 1550 and 1772 CE, which was around the time that the two kingdoms of Lan Na and Lan Xang were both under the support of the Burmese.

Many pieces of Shan artwork depict a Buddha in a seated position, with his right hand pointed towards the Earth; this position is commonly known as the Maravijaya Posture. In Buddhism, the Maravijaya pose represents Buddha calling the Earth Goddess to witness Gautama Shakyamuni's victory over Mara. Sculptures made in this art style were usually made of bronze and later would be sculpted with wood or in lacquer. Traditional Shan art typically had a Buddha with the characteristic monk's robes, or adorned with a crown and decorated with various other mediums like putty and glass.

Shan sculptures are distinctive and easily recognizable when looking through the history of Burmese Buddhist art. Shan sculptures are often identified with oval shaped faces, soft smiles, and closed relaxed eyes.

== Konbaung period ==
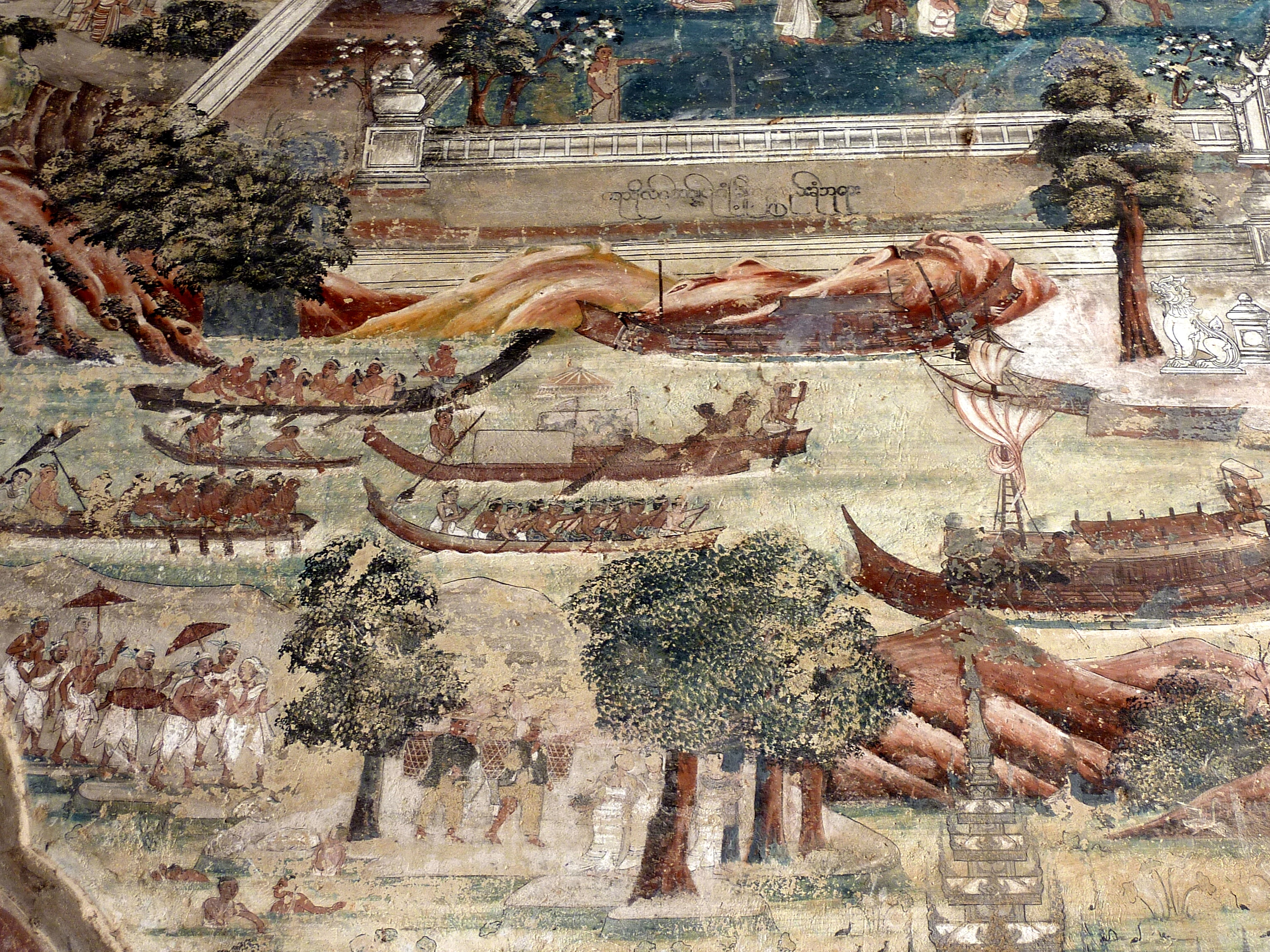
Wall Painting depicting boating in Kyaukawgyi, Amarapura

In 1752, Alaungpaya founded the Konbaung dynasty in response to the collapse of the Taungoo dynasty and the rise of the Restored Hanthawaddy Kingdom. After uniting most of modern-day Myanmar, the Konbaung kings focused on reforms and modernisation with limited success. During the Konbaung period, the techniques of European painting became more established amongst the court and the techniques of linear perspective, chiaroscuro and sfumato entered Burmese painting. Wall painting within temples and monasteries developed these western techniques on traditional Burmese styles, particularly utilizing cast shadows and distant haziness.

This period also saw a proliferation of stupas and temples with developments in stucco techniques. In particular the wooden monasteries of this period remain one of the most uniquely Burmese styles that have survived. The monasteries were decorated with intricate wood carvings of the Jataka Tales. The interiors of the royal court palaces and monasteries were well documented by foreign emissaries of the period who noted intricate wood carvings and the use of visual details and sumptuary laws to indicate the rank of the owner in Burmese material culture- ranging from ornamentation in dresses to "horse furniture" like drinking cups.

The Konbaung period also developed parabaik -folding-book manuscripts that had long been the traditional method of record keeping in Myanmar. White parabaik (Burmese: ပုရပိုက်ဖြူ) was used for painting and drawings, often depicting royal or court activities.

During the Konbaung conquest of Ayutthaya, the Burmese court brought back artisans and adopted the Siamese style of glass mosaics as a form of cultural domination. The style was never fully regained by Siam and continues to be associated with Konbaung-era Burmese art.

Statues from this period, particularly Buddha images, are typically divided into the Amarapura period (1789–1853) and the Mandalay period (1853–1948). King Bagyidaw moved the capital of the Konbaung to Amarapura in 1783 and artisans developed a unique style using wood gild with gold leaf and red lacquer. Images from this period may have been influenced by the capture of the Mahamuni Image with Burmese images featuring rounder faces. In 1853, after the loss of the First Anglo-Burmese War, Mindon Min moved the capital to nearby Mandalay with a planned city following the Buddhist Mandala. Buddha images from the last days of the Burmese monarchy followed a style with a broad band across the forehead and tight curly hair with a prominent ushnisha. Images also returned to various materials including alabaster and bronze. This style was retained through the period of British colonialism.

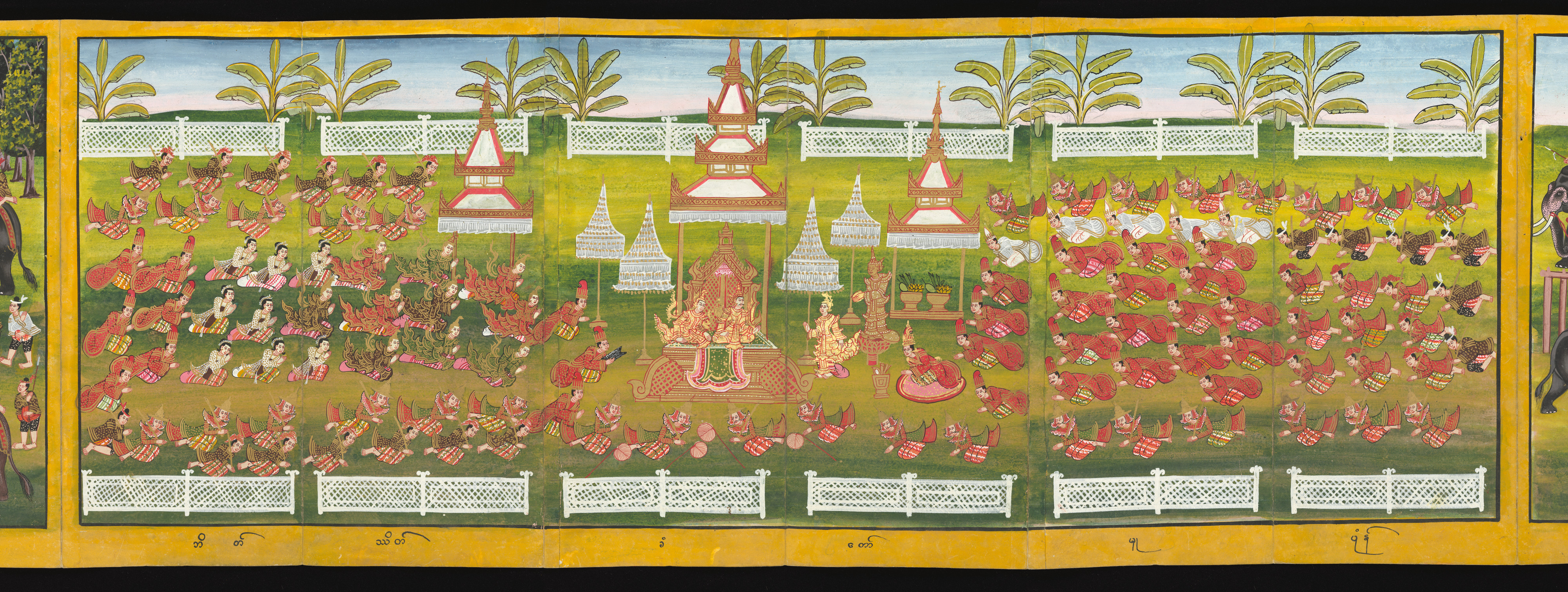
Parabaik of royal activities, 1870s–1880s

== British Burma ==
The early 19th century also saw many prints made by British officers in the country, making sketches of the countryside during their time in the First Anglo-Burmese War (1824–1826)

Burmese European-style painting reached its heights in the early twentieth century from the opening of many art schools and increased travel by Burmese artists to Europe. 20th century painters like Saya Chone, Saya Myo and Saya Saw, painted watercolours depicting aristocratic life. Oil painting also became very popular towards the end of British rule in Burma. The founding father of Myanmar's modern art movement, Ba Nyan, was called the greatest name in Burmese modern painting for his oil paintings.

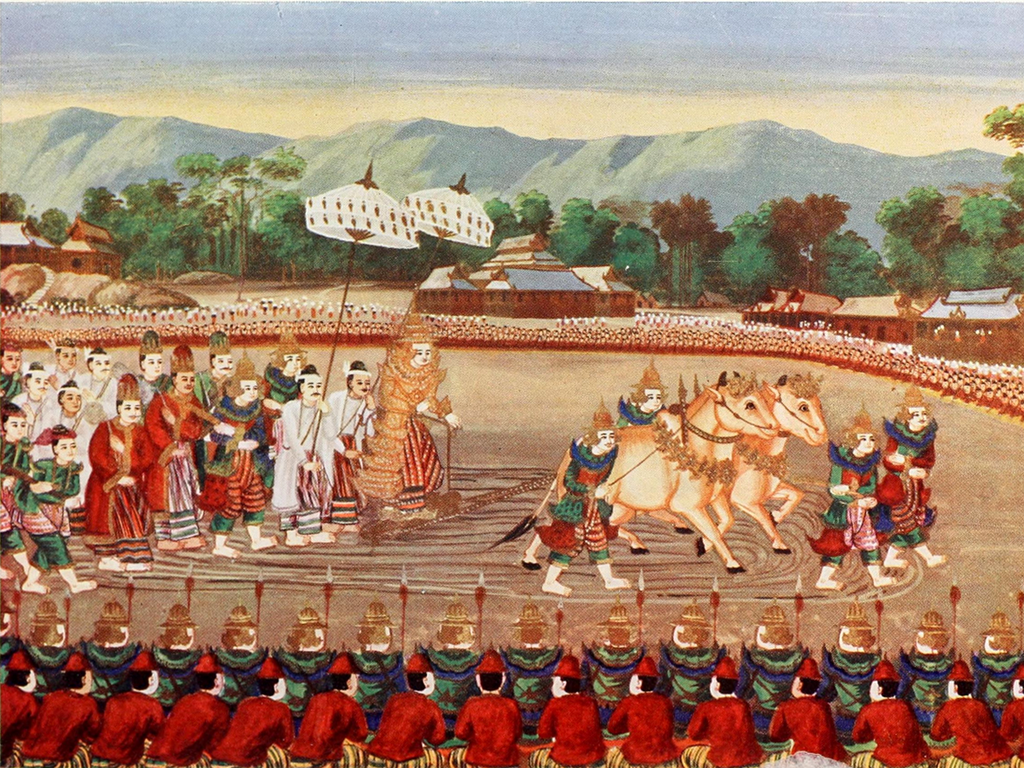
Royal Ploughing Ceremony, Saya Chone, watercolour 1907

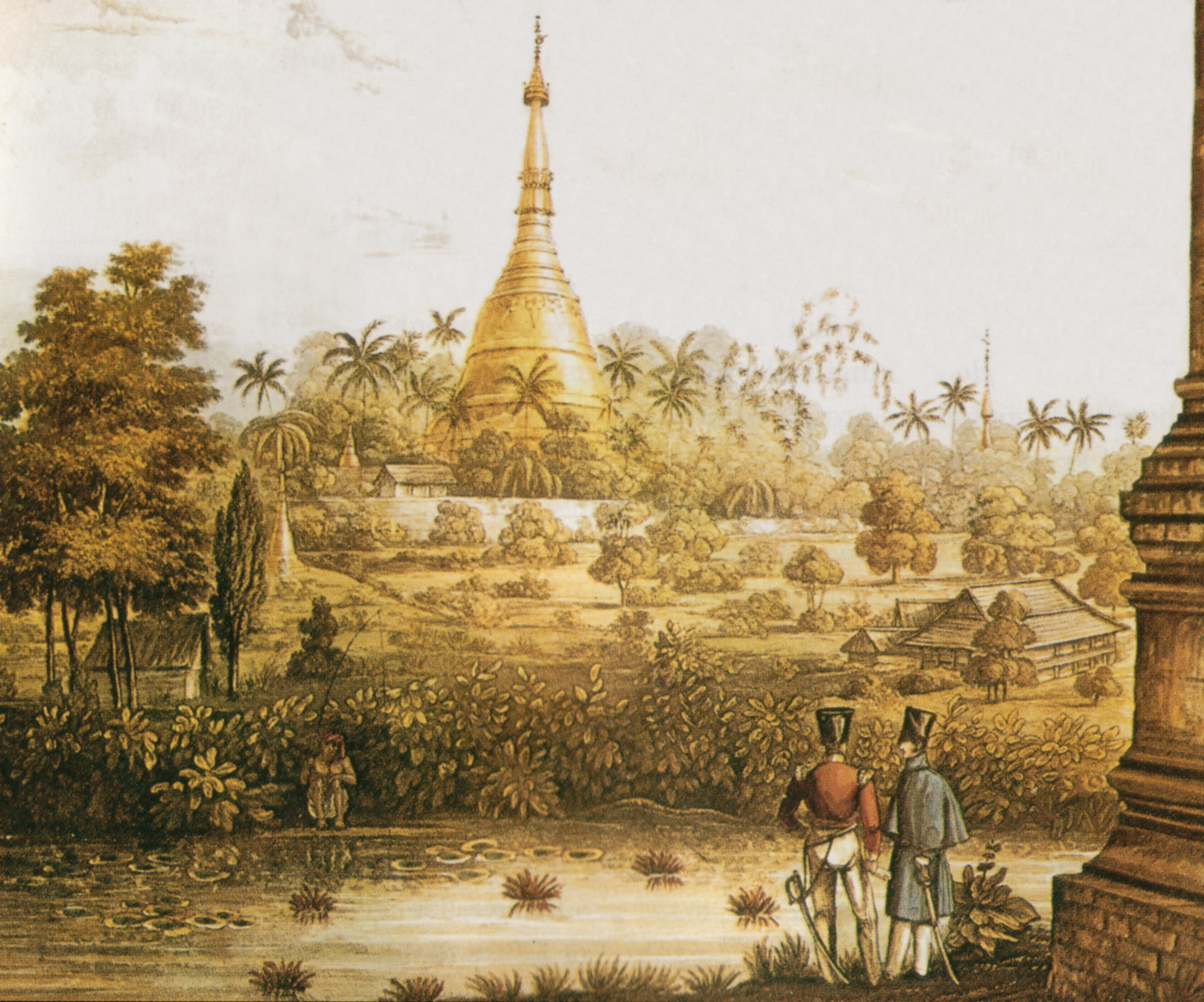
View of the Great Dagon Pagoda, Kingsbury & Co., print 1825

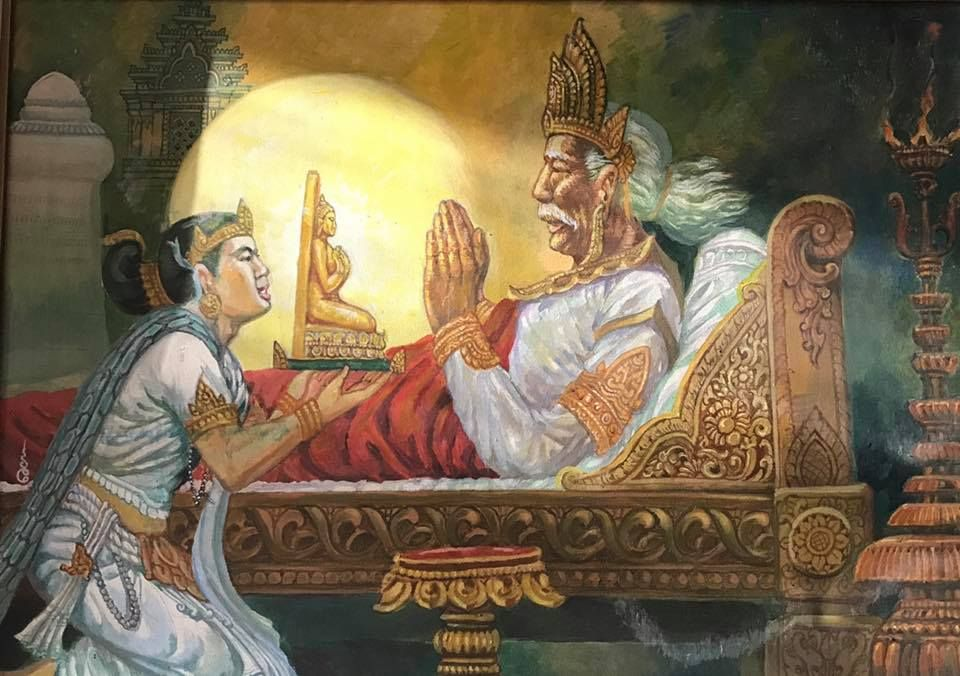
Kyansittha and Rajakumar, 1903 painting by U Ba Nyan

U Ba Oo, 1933 oil painting by U Ba Nyan

== Independence period ==
The 1950s saw the establishment of fine arts schools and active support for the arts. Prominent artists like U Ba Nyan and U Ba Zaw exhibited overseas. From 1962 to 1988, during the Cold War era, postcolonial Myanmar was isolated from the rest of the world as a way to maintain independence. Despite the authoritarian government, propaganda art never reached the levels of similar countries. Instead, the focus of exhibitions continued to be either the ten traditional crafts or traditional landscapes and watercolours as prescribed by Western model of art education.

Mandalay became a site of artistic importance, giving rise to the Mandalay School. Artists of the Mandalay School, like Ba Kyi, created a distinctive Burmese neo-traditional style. Artists like Bagyi Aung Soe and Kin Maung painted using impressionism, cubism and experimental techniques in combination with Burmese traditional art. Aung Soe was a seminal figure for modern Burmese art through the 20th century, with his unique vision and skill showcasing the interconnectedness of all things inspiring artist towards modernist movements in Myanmar.

== SLORC Era and censorship ==
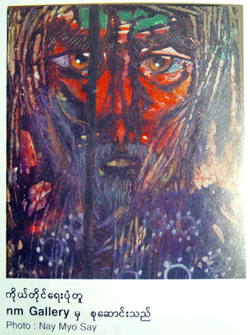
Self-portrait, Bagyi Aung Soe, 1980s

In 1989, Myanmar began to open international trade and state control was relaxed. This allowed Myanmar's artists more opportunities to engage with international artists. Western art became an outlet to criticise the govnerment, leading to a shift towards new mediums and style. However, many artists were arrested with their works seized when they were deemed subversive.

The government of Myanmar banned or confiscated artwork on prohibited subjects censored art exhibitions. The prohibited subjects included political criticism, nudity and even the use of certain colours. In 1970, censors defaced unapproved artworks with stamps reading "not allowed to show" on the front and back. Approved paintings depicted the political leader Ne Win (1910 – 2002), socialism and its agrarian utopia, the purity of Burmese culture and Buddhism. Some artists became defiant of the censorship.

== Contemporary art in Myanmar ==
The contemporary art of Myanmar reflects the country's prolonged period of isolation from 1962 to 2011, and the influence of Buddhism. Many works explore Buddhist themes and the difficult socio-political situation. In this age of globalization, Burmese contemporary art has developed largely on its own terms.

In 1997, access to the internet allowed a contemporary art community in Myanmar to grow. However, government censorship, civil unrest, economic hardship and isolation have affected Myanmar artists and their art. For instance, the government restricted art to religious depictions and expressions of the natural beauty of the nation.

One of the first to study western art was Ba Nyan, one of the pioneers of Western-style painting in the country along with Ngwe Gaing and others.

Lun Gywe (born 1930) is a prominent master of Burmese painting, and the mentor of many younger generations of artists. Lun Gywe is a master with colours, often in an impressionistic manner, and the beauty of women features prominently in his work. His works appear in the National Museum of Myanmar and the National Art Gallery of Malaysia.

San Hlaing was a Burmese artist born on 24 December 1923 in Pyapon, Ayeyarwady Region, Myanmar. He was a versatile artist who not only illustrated the traditional, but also commercial arts. He studied under artists Ngwe Gaing, Hla Maung Gyi, Sayar Mhat and artist U Thein Nyunt.

In the special issues of Taing Lone Kyaw and Myanma Alin Newspaper, all the covers were of U Sann Hlaing's paintings. Shumawa, Ngwe Taryi, Pe Phu Hiwar, Mahaythi, Yadanarmon, Myatsumon magazines, Loke Thar, Pyi Thu Kye, Khit Myanmar, Myitmaka, Byar Deik Pan, Taya Yeik Myaing Journals, U Sann Hlaing works were seen monthly and consecutively. From the No (1) issue of Sit Pyan, he drew illustrations for a long period. The 10 Jataka Tales, 550 Nipats were illustrated by U Sann Hlaing, which were fall with Myanmar styles and cultures.

Aung Kyaw Htet (born 1965) is a devout Buddhist who grew up in a small village, two factors which have a strong influence on his art. His paintings of religious life in Burma show monks and nuns in a realistic manner, though non-essential objects are omitted from the paintings to focus on the religious aspects. Aung Kyaw Htet paints the faces of monks and nuns in great detail to show their humanity. His works are represented in the National Museum of Myanmar and the National Art Gallery of Malaysia.

Other artists whose works have been included in the permanent collection of the National Art Gallery of Malaysia include MPP Yei Myint, Myint Swe, Min Wai Aung and Aung Myint.

The younger generation of upcoming international contemporary artists include Nyein Chan Su and The Maw Naing and the Gangaw Village Artist Group.

Other contemporary artists include Po Po (born 1957), a self-taught artist who lives and works in Yangon, and works with various media especially with installation works. He has staged solo exhibitions since 1987, such as "Untitled" and "Solid Concept". He participated in the Kwangju Biennale 2000, the Flying Circus Project 2004 and Yokohama Triennale 2005.

Wah Nu was born in Yangon in 1977, and launched her artistic career after graduating from the University of Culture, Yangon in 1998, where she majored in music. Since then she has mainly been adopting painting and video as media. In 2004, she held her first solo exhibition, "Cloud Department" in Yangon, followed in 2005 by "Self-Identity" at the Art-U Room gallery, in Tokyo, Japan. She showed in group exhibitions including Bangladesh Biennale 2004, Fukuoka Triennale 2005 and Another Seven Artists in Yangon 2008.

Most of the young artists who were born in the 1980s have greater opportunities to practise art inside and outside the country. Performance art is a popular genre among young Burmese artists, including Aung Ko, Moe Satt, Mrat Lunn Htwann and Nyan Lin Htet. Nyan Lin Htet started making performance art in the early 2000s and later joined the contemporary theatre group Annees Folles for intensive theatre training with Japanese theatre director Arata Kitamura in Japan. Since 2005, Lin Htet has been involved in the international performance art and theatre scenes. After founding the Yangon-based experimental theatre group Theatre of the Disturbed in 2005, Lin Htet directed theatrical adaptations of dramatic and literary works by Samuel Beckett, Eugène Ionesco and Franz Kafka as well as dramatic works by local playwrights including himself. In 2007, he was awarded the two-year artist-in-residency programme at the Cité internationale des arts in Paris, with the support of Alliance Française de Rangoun and the French Ministry of Foreign Affairs.

== Notable Burmese artists ==
- San Hlaing (1923–2015; Burmese: စန်းလှိုင်) — painter and artist for the Burma Socialist Programme Party, famous for his commercial arts as well as traditional Jataka Tales paintings. He was the designer of the Flag of Myanmar used from 1974 to 2010. His family preserved and collected over 400 of his artworks, including oil paintings, watercolors, and pen and ink pieces. In his honor, they established the Anawrahta Art Gallery
- Director Win Pe (Burmese: ဝင်းဖေ) — a cartoonist, painter and film director, worked for the Ludu Kyi-bwa-yay Press in Mandalay. His work was censored by the government. Win Pe said, "The military wanted to be sure of themselves, their security… that there was no direct assault against them through art."
- Aung Khaing — Khaing was a semi-abstract painter. In 1984, at the Bogyoke Aung San Market, Khaing attempted his first solo exhibition of works influenced by those of Gauguin and Monet. During his exhibit, government censors visited him on three separate occasions. During the first few visits, the censors removed around thirty paintings they deemed inappropriate. On the final visit, all remaining artworks left on display were deemed unacceptable to be viewed. In protest, Khaing no longer displayed his paintings. However, in October 2013 at the Bogyoke Aung San Market, he held a solo exhibit.
- Maung Theid Dhi — During a more severe period of art censorship in Burma, Maung was arrested for not complying with censors' orders to alter his artwork. In 1974, at the Wild Eye Art Exhibition in Yangon, Maung exhibited a self-portrait on wood surrounded by a metal chain. Government censors interpreted this piece as a criticism of government restriction of Burmese life, and removed it from the exhibit almost immediately. The censors allowed Maung to retrieve the painting later. However, when it was returned, the work was missing its original adornments. Maung later put the same piece in another exhibit, but this time wrapped in leather and rope and placed atop the skull of a deer. Soon after displaying the new piece, censors arrested him without explanation and Maung spent a week in jail. After his release, Maung continued to exhibit the same piece. As a result, censors and detectives arrived at his home accusing him of creating political artworks. Several such visits caused Maung and his family great distress. Maung was arrested again for his “suspicious” artworks. Such distress left Maung too afraid to create paintings based on his political sketches but he did create paintings depicting the censors.

== See also ==
- List of Burmese visual artists
- Sitt Nyein Aye, painter
- Htein Lin (activist) (born 1966), painter and performance artist
- Asian art
- Yangon Gallery

== Bibliography ==
- Galloway, Charlotte (2020). "Arts". In Simpson, Adam; Farrelly, Nicholas; Holliday, Ian (eds.). Routledge Handbook of Contemporary Myanmar. Routledge. ISBN 9781138820777.
- Aung-Thwin, Michael (1996). "Kingdom of Pagan". In Gillian Cribbs (ed.). Myanmar Land of the Spirits. Guernsey: Co & Bear Productions. ISBN 978-0-9527665-0-6.
- Ching, Isabel (1 July 2011). "Art from Myanmar: Possibilities of Contemporaneity?". Third Text. 25 (4). doi:10.1080/09528822.2011.587688. S2CID 142589816.
- San Tha Aung (1979). The Buddhist art of ancient Arakan: an eastern border state beyond ancient India, east of Vanga and Samatata. Vol. 43. Daw Saw Saw.
- Schober, Juliane (2002). Sacred biography in the Buddhist traditions of South and Southeast Asia. Motilal Banarsidass Publ. ISBN 978-81-208-1812-5.
- Carlson, Melissa (2016). "Painting as Cipher: Censorship of the Visual Arts in Post-1988 Myanmar". Sojourn. 31 (1): 116. doi:10.1353/soj.2016.0001. S2CID 147382023.
- Raymond, Catherine (1 May 2009). "Shan Buddhist Art on the Market: What, Where and Why?" (PDF). Contemporary Buddhism. 10 (1): 141–157. doi:10.1080/14639940902916219. S2CID 144490936.
