= Thavibu Gallery =

Thavibu Gallery (established in 1998) is an art gallery and art book publisher in Bangkok, Thailand.

Since its founding, the gallery has followed the growth of contemporary art practices of Thailand, Vietnam and Burma and has showcased the art that best reflects the cultural identity of these countries. By exhibiting works of both senior established artists as well as upcoming talents, the gallery showcases art that is diverse and appealing to a broad audience. Specially curated exhibitions and documentation have enabled art enthusiasts an insight into the vibrant social environment of these three countries that are historically linked (though they have very different political and economic identities).

The dynamic social fabric of Thailand, which has occasionally found itself in tension with its deep-rooted Buddhist heritage, remains a captivating subject for visual artists. From Vietnam, the romanticism and articulate aesthetics imbued into the visual arts through the influences of Indochina’s French Colonial rule continues to be evident in the unique lacquer works while Burmese contemporary art reflects its current condition.

By participating regularly in major art fairs and interacting with established auction houses such as Sotheby's and Christie's, Thavibu Gallery has showcased the art to a broader audience. Through its interaction with major art institutions in Asia and Europe, Thavibu Gallery enabled artists to participate in non commercial shows. Several of the artists represented by the gallery have works in the permanent collections of art museums in Asia, including the National Museum of Myanmar, the National Art Gallery of Malaysia, Singapore Art Museum, Queensland Art Gallery and the Fukuoka Art Museum.

== Artists represented ==
Thai artists represented include: Pinaree Sanpitak, Vasan Sitthiket, Jirapat Tatsanasomboon, Kritsana Chaikitwattana, Thaweesak Srithongdee, Therdkiat Wangwatcharakul, Angkana Kongpetch, Jittagarn Kaewtinkoy, Navin Rawanchaikul.

Vietnamese artists represented include: Truong Tan, Dinh Quan, Le Quang Ha, Trinh Tuan, Nguyen Trung, Pham An Hai, Van Duong Thanh, Dinh Y Nhi, Nguyen Thi Chau Giang.

Burmese artists represented include: Aung Kyaw Htet, Aung Myint, U Lun Gywe, MPP Yei Myint, Phyu Mon, Aye Ko, Nyein Chan Su, Htein Lin, Chaw Ei Thein.

== Books published ==
1. Flavours – Thai Contemporary Art by Steven Pettifor (ISBN 9749173767)
2. Old Myanmar [Burmese] Paintings in the Collection of U Win by Hla Tin HTun (ISBN 9749931823)
3. U Lun Gywe – A Master Painter from Myanmar by Jorn Middelborg (Ed) (ISBN 9749290569)
4. Dinh Quan – Lacquer Paintings by Jorn Middelborg (Ed) (ISBN 9749206622)
5. Trinh Tuan – Lacquer Paintings by Jorn Middelborg (Ed) (ISBN 9749110390)
6. Cong Kim Hoa – Lacquer Paintings by Shireen Naziree (ISBN 9789749468371)
7. Impressions and Expressions – Vietnamese Contemporary Painting by Shireen Naziree and Phan Cam Thuong (ISBN 9789749433683)
8. Art works by Bui Xuan Phai from the collection of Van Duong Thanh by Jorn Middelborg (Ed) (ISBN 9789749495186)
9. Pham An Hai – Expressions & Abstractions by Jorn Middelborg (Ed) (ISBN 9789747348606)
10. Aung Kyaw Htet – Myanmar Inspirations by Shireen Naziree (ISBN 9789748102931)
11. Feasting the Female Form – U Lun Gywe by Shireen Naziree and Jorn Middelborg (ISBN 9786169072904)
