= Yangon Gallery =

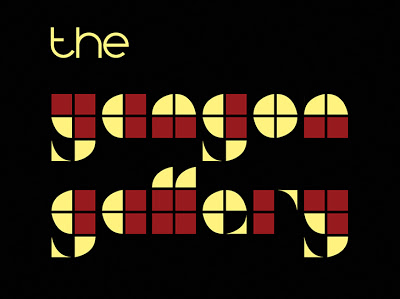
The Yangon Gallery Logo

The Yangon Gallery is a contemporary art center located at People's Square and Park which is one of the most historic places in Myanmar. The Yangon Gallery organizes events of all art forms including painting, fashion, photography, music, film, documentary and literature. The Yangon Gallery is one of the art spaces in Yangon which can host all artistic platforms.

== The Yangon Gallery Art Events ==
=== Monsoon Art Festival ===
Right after the gallery was opened on July 25, 2014, the Yangon Gallery celebrated Monsoon Art Festival which helped introduced the gallery to Myanmar (Burma) art community. The program consisted of 9 art events from July 27 to September 28, 2014. The art events were One Year Sketch in Yangon - A Solo Exhibition by Artist Zaw Mong, Weaver of the Waves - Myanmar Acheik Show by Fashion Designer Mogok Pauk Pauk, Music Fest performed by Sebastian See-Schierenberg and Ensemble, Gitameit Jazz Band, and group performance organized by Side Effect Band while displaying artworks by Artist Than Htay and Zaw Maw, Angelic - A Solo Exhibition by Artist Saw Kyaw Zaw, Film Festival partnered with Wathann Film Fest and Tagu Films, Same Direction - A Group Exhibition by Artist Win Pe Myint and group, Literature Fest - Book Fair and Lectures conducted by Myanmar (Burma) authors including Ju, Photo City Group Show by Photographers Moe Min (Rays), Htin Lin (Golden Arrow), Than Aung (Black & White), Mya Win (City Rays), and Aung Pyae Sone (Black & White), and Wet Canvas - The First Solo Exhibition of Artist, Maung Hla Myint.

=== Wathann Film Fest ===
Wathann Film Fest #4 was held at The Yangon Gallery from September 24–28, 2014.

=== Classical Music Concert in support of Violin Programme for Blind Children ===
On 30 October 2014, The Yangon Gallery hosted the Classical Music Concert in support of Violin programme for blind children, presented by Live4Music and supported by British Council. The purpose of the concert was to raise funds for the music foundation Sebastian See-Schierenberg has founded at the School of Blind in Yangon. The money was raised through donation from the attending guests and from the sale of photographs by Photographers Moe Min, Htin Lin, Than Aung, Mya Win and Aung Pyae Sone, presented by The Yangon Gallery.

=== Fragrance of Myanmar ===
Fragrance of Myanmar was an art exhibition consisting a collection of 96 paintings, of the late but the greatest artists of Myanmar. The displayed artworks were by Ngwe Gaing, Khin Maung (Bank), Thar Dun, Ba Thet, Aung Soe, Maung Ngwe Tun, Paw Oo Thet, Kan Nyunt, Nyein Shane, Nyan Thwin, Kin Maung Yin, Wathone, and Kyaw Lay. The Fragrance of Myanmar Exhibition was displayed at The Yangon Gallery for 3 days from 7 to 9 November 2014.

=== Economic Sanctions 2021 ===
As part of the US economic sanctions initiative against the Burmese military, Yangon Gallery was added to the list of sanctions targets (specially designated nationals or SDNs) March 10, 2021. The Gallery is owned by Aung Pyae Sone, the son of commander-in-chief of Burma's military, Min Aung Hlaing.

== See also ==
- Asian Art
- Burmese Contemporary Art
- People's Square and Park
