= Andrew Stahl (artist) =

British painter (1954–2024)

Andrew Michael Stahl (1954 – 14 October 2024) was a British painter who lived and worked in the United Kingdom. Known for his large figurative paintings, he was a Professor of Fine Art and Head of Undergraduate Painting at the Slade School of Fine Art.

== Biography ==
Stahl was born in London in 1954. In 1979, he won the Abbey Major Scholarship and spent two years at The British School at Rome. He then returned to the UK for his first solo show in London at the Arts Council-funded AIR Gallery in 1981. Since then, his works have been shown widely and internationally.

In 2000, Stahl attended a British Council funded residency at Chiang Mai University. Much of his later work reflects on travels to Japan and Thailand, addressing the conflation of time, space, and cultures that long-haul travels bring. His paintings approach cultural differences and connections using pictorial language, imagination and figuration. This was underpinned by a further series of residencies in Thailand, plus residencies in Australia (Sydney) and China (Guangzhou).

Later solo shows were hosted at locations such as Robert Steele Gallery, New York City and Matthew Bown Gallery, London, 2007; as well as Anywhere Anytime Anyhow, Ardel Gallery Bangkok 2009. New Paintings, Robert Steele Gallery, New York, 2010 was a two-person show with Panya Vijinthanasarn hosted in 2014 at Thavibu Gallery Bangkok. Group shows included the British Council show Monologue/Dialogue featuring artists from the UK and Thailand, Part 1 in Bangkok, 2006 and Part 2 in London, 2008; Stew, Artspace, London, 2008; Same as it ever was, University of the Arts, London, 2008; Painting of the 80s, Matthew Bown Gallerie, Berlin, 2009 and Select, Peppercannister Gallery, Dublin, 2010. In June 2014, being interested in transcultural interaction, Stahl both curated and participated in Monologue/Dialogue 3 Fragility and Monumentality, a group show at the BACC in Bangkok, Thailand of 12 British and Thai Artists funded by the British Council and the Thai Ministry of Culture.

Stahl died after a long illness on 14 October 2024.
