= Mezaligon =

Coordinates: 23°8′0″N 95°21′0″E

Mezaligon (aka Mezaligôn)is a village in the Sagaing Division, northern Burma. It is located to the north of Henzada in the Irrawaddy Delta.

The village was the birthplace of the painter and performance artist Htein Lin in 1966.
