= Kyi Phyu Shin =

- ကြည်ဖြူသျှင်
- Born: 26 December 1975 (age 50); Rangoon, Burma
- Education: B.A. Burmese
- Alma mater: Yangon Film School
- Occupation: Film director
- Years active: 1997-present
- Parent(s): Tin Win Shin; Khin Lay Theint
- Awards: Best Short Award (2008)
- Website: www.kyiphyushin.com

Kyi Phyu Shin (Burmese: ကြည်ဖြူသျှင်) is a Burmese film director. At the 2008 National Geographic Society's All Roads Film Festival, she won the Best Short Award for her documentary A Sketch of Wathone. She attended at BEHS 2 Latha and Yangon Film School. She is on the Bogyoke Film Executive Board, which was formed to develop a biopic about Aung San, the country's founding father.
