= Vicky Bowman =

British diplomat (born 1966)

UK Ambassador to Myanmar
- In office 2002–2006
- Monarch: Elizabeth II
- Prime Minister: Tony Blair
- Preceded by: Sir John Jenkins (diplomat)
- Succeeded by: Mark Canning

Personal details
- Born: Victoria Jane Robinson; 12 June 1966 (age 59)
- Spouse: Htein Lin
- Children: 1
- Parent: Neville Robinson (father)
- Relatives: Andrew Robinson (brother)
- Education: Oxford High School
- Alma mater: Pembroke College, Cambridge (BA Hons, Natural Sciences - Pathology)

Victoria Jane Bowman CMG (née Robinson; born 12 June 1966) is a British former diplomat who served as UK Ambassador to Myanmar between 2002 and 2006. She has been Director of the Myanmar Centre for Responsible Business (MCRB) since July 2013.

She was educated at The Dragon School, Oxford High School, Pembroke College, Cambridge and the University of Chicago.

"Bowman " is the family name of her first husband. Bowman first served as a junior diplomat in what was then called Burma in 1990.

On 24 August 2022, she was detained at her home in Yangon along with her second husband Htein Lin, a prominent artist and former political prisoner, and charged with immigration offences. In September 2022, she was sentenced to one year in prison for staying at an address different to the one she had registered under.

On 17 November 2022, the Myanmar military released Bowman, along with 6,000 prisoners, to mark Myanmar National Day. She was subsequently deported.

She was made a Companion of the Order of St Michael and St George (CMG) in the 2023 Birthday Honours.
