= Po Po =

Burmese artist

- Born: Hla Oo; 1957 (age 68–69); Pathein, Irrawaddy Division, Myanmar
- Known for: Painting
- Movement: Performance Art

Po Po (born 1957) is a Burmese installation and performance artist. His work has been exhibited in Japan, South Korea and Berlin.

== Life ==
Po Po was born in 1957 in Pathein, Myanmar. His formal name is Hla Oo and he is self-taught. Since 1987, Po Po has held many solo exhibitions, and his work has been shown at the Yokohama Triennale in Yokohama, Japan, the Gwangju Biennale in Gwangju, South Korea, Fukuoka Triennale in Fukuoka, Japan and in the House of World Cultures, Berlin. A May 2004 report described Po Po as one of the younger Myanmar artists who were creating impressive works in isolation and in conditions of penury. However, Po Po is one of the few "contemporary" Myanmar artists who have been able to travel for participating in the Fukuoka Asian Art Museum's event in 1999, for instance. He was also able to take part in Saigon Open City in Vietnam. In June 2010 he visited Singapore to give a talk at the Osage Art Foundation.

== Work ==
Po Po, and another self-taught artist Aung Myint, are pioneers in the performance art field in Myanmar, with Po Po staging a 30-minute seminal performance in 1997. Po Po is widely regarded as Myanmar's first practitioner of this art form. Many of his works are playful, impulsive, ironic and sociable. Other works are provocative and shocking. His installation work "rice terrace" at the Osage Gallery in Singapore in May/June 2010 involved 1000 Styrofoam boxes, each with about 100 grains of growing rice, with the boxes arranged on mud terraces in the gallery. He describes his computer-installation Scream of the Dead, which features an open mass grave, as a metaphor for life in Myanmar and the world today. His work is thoughtful and full of depth. In his photography he employs elements of cubism, which he considers to be the "highest state of intellectual approach" to painting. A critic has said: "At best, his works reflect the lightness of being, joyfully, bearably so".
