= Aye Ko (artist) =

Burmese artist

- အေးကို
- Born: 7 August 1963 (age 63); Pathein, Myanmar
- Known for: Painter
- Awards: Myanmar contemporary art awards(Final List) 2004; Asia Culture council awards 2005; Joseph Balestier Award 2017

Aye Ko (Burmese: အေးကို; born 7 August 1963) is a painter and former political prisoner from Myanmar. He is one of Myanmar's most profiled contemporary artists internationally. On 10 January 2017, he received the 2017 Joseph Balestier Award for the Freedom of Art. He is one of the founders of New Zero Art Space.

== Biography ==
Aye Ko was born on 7 August 1963 in Pathein, Myanmar. Under the master artist, U Min Soe, he trained in classic and traditional painting. In 1990, he was arrested and sentenced to a three-year imprisonment about student revolution and the underground movement for democracy. In 2008, He founded New Zero Art Space with his colleagues.
