= Sitt Nyein Aye =

Burmese artist and activist (1956–2023)

- စစ်ငြိမ်းအေး
- Born: Sein Aye; 24 April 1956; Nyaung-U, Burma
- Died: 1 September 2023 (aged 67); Colorado, U.S.
- Education: Mandalay Fine Arts School
- Known for: Painting
- Movement: Burmese contemporary art

Sitt Nyein Aye (Burmese: စစ်ငြိမ်းအေး, IPA: [sɪʔ ɲéiɰ̃ ʔé]; 24 April 1956 – 1 September 2023) was a Burmese artist.

Sitt Nyein Aye came from a small village, near Nyaung-U Township in Upper Myanmar. He was born Sein Aye (စိန်အေး) to Daw Than Swe and U Tun Pe. His parents were farmers with no money for education. Monks in the village monastery provided the resources needed for him to attend high school. He secretly studied modern art but this was frowned upon by his teachers, being dubbed "mad art". He failed to achieve the top prize that would have allowed him to study abroad. Instead, he lived on the streets and sold artworks to passers-by.

Sitt Nyein Aye spent two months in custody for sketching the ruins of a student union that had been blown up by Ne Win in 1962. As a supporter of the pro-democracy movement in Burma, he had lived in exile in India.

Originally called Sein Aye, he changed his name to Sitt Nyein Aye, which means War and Peace, after reading the novel by Leo Tolstoy, in his twenties.

Htein Lin, the Burmese painter and performance artist, studied under Sitt Nyein Aye.

Earlier report said that Aye died on September 1, 2023.

== See also ==
- Burmese contemporary art
