= Chan Aye =

Burmese artist

- ချမ်းအေး
- Born: 1954 (age 71–72); Mandalay, Myanmar
- Occupations: sculptor, installation artist, painter, and writer
- Spouse: Phyu Mon

Chan Aye is a Burmese sculptor, installation artist, painter, and writer.

He won the Philip Morris Group of Companies Myanmar Art Awards 2001/2002 and the 2004 Sovereign Annual Contemporary Asia Art Prize.

== Selected exhibitions ==
=== Solo exhibition ===
- 2013 Cheimt & Chan: Collaborate Works, Lokanat Galleries, Yangon, Myanmar

=== Group exhibitions ===
- 2017 Yangon Made My Heart Beat Fast: New Contemporary Art from Myanmar, Karin Weber Gallery, Central, Hong Kong, Hong Kong

== Personal life ==
In 1985, Chan Aye married to the artist Phyu Mon.
