= Aung Kyaw Htet =

Painter

- အောင်ကျော်ထက်
- Born: 12 June 1965 (age 60); Myaungmya
- Education: Studies at the State School of Fine Arts, Rangoon and with Art masters Thukha and Aung Moe
- Known for: Painter

Aung Kyaw Htet (Burmese: အောင်ကျော်ထက်; born 1965) is a painter from Myanmar. His paintings of religious life in Myanmar show monks and nuns in a realistic manner, though non-essential objects are omitted from the paintings.

== Biography ==
Aung Kyaw Htet was born in 1965 in Myaungmya and studied at the State School of Fine Arts in Yangon, after working on a river boat for years in order to save enough money for his art education. His paintings of religious life in Myanmar show monks and nuns in a realistic manner, though non-essential objects are omitted from the paintings. He has participated in several exhibitions internationally. His paintings are in the museum collections of the National Museum of Myanmar and the National Art Gallery of Malaysia. His work is now exclusively shown at the Thavibu Gallery in Bangkok.
