= Aung Aung Taik =

Burmese artist (born 1948)

- Born: 1948 (age 77–78); Yangon, Burma
- Citizenship: United States (from 1994)
- Education: State Academy of Art, Rangoon; San Francisco Art Institute
- Known for: Painting, mixed media, sculpture, writing
- Notable work: Visions of Shwedagon (1989); Under the Golden Pagoda: The Best of Burmese Cooking (1993)
- Movement: Zero Art Group
- Website: aungaungtaik.com

Aung Aung Taik (born 1948) is a Burmese artist.

== Early life and education ==
Born in Yangon, Burma in 1948, he received the traditional education of his class. Following boarding school he decided not to follow in his father's footsteps through medical school, but rather chose to study painting. He attended the State Academy of Art in Rangoon and took private lessons from two of Burma's leading artists, U Ba Kyi and U Ngwe Gaing. His mentors, the writers Ludu U Hla and his wife Daw Amar introduced him to the world of letters and philosophy. He accompanied them on a number of anthropological expeditions into the remote regions of Burma and illustrated a series of books published by Ludu U Hla. He had successful exhibits of his work in Burma and Japan but as his work moved in an abstract philosophical direction the government put increasing pressure on him to conform to representational forms and heroic socialist subject matter.

== In the United States ==
Wanting more artistic freedom he immigrated to the United States in 1972 and continued his studies at the San Francisco Art Institute. A series of exhibitions led to his first one-man show in the United States in 1981, where Tom Albright commented in the San Francisco Chronicle that Aung Aung's paintings “...suggest some of the strange stage sets of Francis Bacon carried to a greater degree of abstraction...”

== Concepts ==
Fascinated by the act of dissection, Aung Aung Taik's later mixed media works are the result of a deep curiosity regarding the study and comprehension of the source of life and the death that follows.

== Writing ==
Intense engagement with the diversity of cultural life in the San Francisco of the 80s led him to a mastery of the English language and the desire to express himself in poetry and prose. His autobiographical novel Visions of Shwedagon in which he wrote of art, love, death and religious contemplation along with a deep devotion to his home country was published in 1989. A renewed interest in the Theravada tradition of Buddhism native to his homeland led to a series of sculptural representations of the Buddha and the essay, A View from the Lower Life' (1992). An accomplished cook, he wrote Under the Golden Pagoda - The Best of Burmese Cooking, an early introduction of Burmese cuisine to the West. Aung Aung Taik became an American citizen in 1994.

== Return to Burma ==
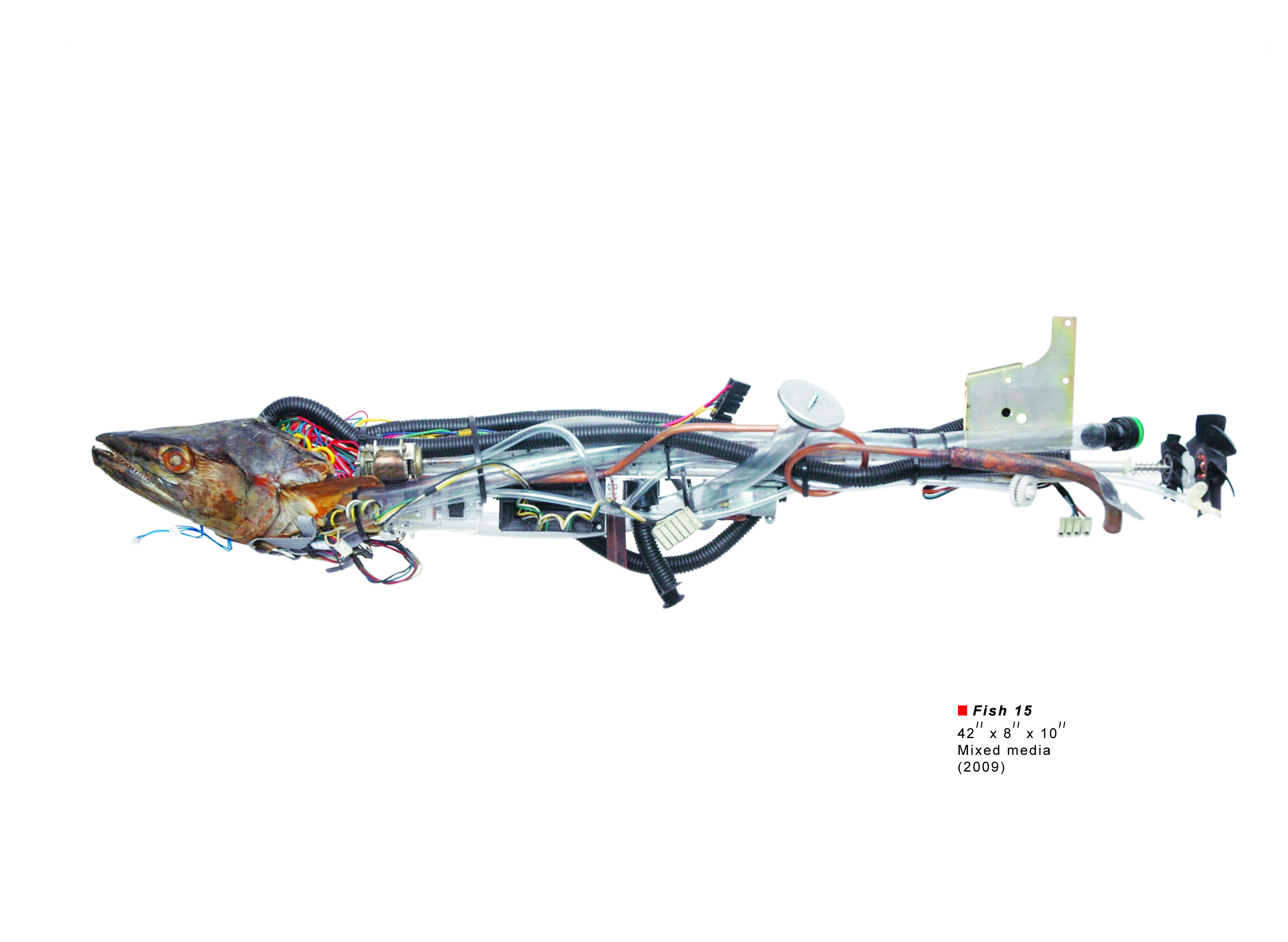
Fish Sculpture

In 2001, he returned to Burma to paint, and had his first solo exhibition there after 30 years in America. He has returned annually and has had one man shows and group shows in Rangoon and Mandalay. He conducts art workshops and forums at the Htanyeiknyo Art Center in Mandalay.

Aung Aung Taik is a member of a group of Burmese modern artists called the New Zero Art Group as well as the founder of [Friends of Myanmar Arts], a non-profit organization formed to benefit the arts community in Burma.

== Selected exhibits ==
- 2004 Group show-Fresno Art Museum.
- 2009 Fresno Art Museum-One man show.
- 2011 Poetry in the Garden-Solo Reading- UC Davis, Ca.
- 2011 International Art Show for Peace-Losing Count- Zacatecas, Mexico.
