= Nann Nann =

Burmese painter

- နန်းနန်း
- Born: 5 January 1974 (age 52); Yangon
- Education: Studies at the State School of Fine Arts, Rangoon
- Known for: Painter, Sculptors

Nann Nann (Burmese: နန်းနန်း; born January 5, 1974) is a painter and modern sculptor from Myanmar.

She won many domestic and international art awards. Since 1978, she has been awarded 30 different local arts awards, and over 45 from international organisations. She also won the Myanmar Times Contemporary Art Award in 2004.

== Early life and education ==
Nann Nann was born on January 5, 1974 in Yangon. She is the daughter of the artist U Mya Aye and artist Daw Nwe Nwei. Nann Nann grew up with a passion for painting and performed outstandingly in many children's exhibitions. At the age of 8, she took part in the second Women's Art Exhibition (1982).

Later on, she graduated with a Diploma of Fine Art from State School of Fine Art, Yangon at 1993 and a Bachelor of Art Degree in Sculpture from the University of Culture, Yangon at 1998.

== Awards ==
- 1978 – 1990 Over 45 awards from various international organizations and Over 30 awards from various Burmese government organizations
- 2004 Honourable Mention – Myanmar Contemporary Art Awards
