= Phyu Mon =

Burmese artist

- ဖြူမွန်
- Born: 1960 (age 65–66); Mandalay, Myanmar
- Occupations: Painter, poet
- Spouse: Chan Aye

Phyu Mon is a Burmese writer, photographer, performance artist, and painter. She is also known for being very much gender-aware.

Mon is best known as a leading digital artist and has participated in art exhibitions in many countries such as Italy, Japan, Philippines, Indonesia, Korea, Hong Kong, Singapore and France.

== Biography ==
Phyu Mon was born in 1960 in Mandalay, Myanmar. She graduated from Mandalay University with B.A. in Literature. From 1978 to 1979, she studied painting under the Master artist U Ba Thaw.

From 1989 to 1995, together with her husband, Phyu Mon started an embroidery company. At the same time, she continued her passion for story-writing and drawing.

In 1981, she published her first short story, which was featured in the annual "University" magazine. Later on, in July 1986, another short story, "Suffering", was shown in Dagon magazine.

In 1997, she started performance art in Mandalay. In 2000, she collaborated with Japanese artist Seiji Shimoda.

Under Pekka Niskanen, she studied film art from the High Tech Training School of Finland in 2005. She screened her film Blend the World in 2007 in Denmark.

In 2013, Phyu Mon studied video and film production through a program from the High Tech Training School of Finland. In 2014, she received her diploma from the National University of Culture and Art.

In 2017, she showed Blooming Sound at the Wathann Film Festival. Her films were also screened abroad, in Japan, Indonesia, Philippines and Thailand.

== Selected exhibitions ==
- Hope – T.H.E.O. Arts Professionals, Singapore, 2013
- Dream Lands – Asia Fine Art Limited, Hong Kong, SAR, 2012

=== Group exhibitions ===
- Beyond Burma, Bangkok, 2012
- One Hundred Years International Days, Hong Kong, 2011
- Magnetic Power, Seoul, 2009
- Aye Ko, Aung Myint, Nyein Chan Su, Burma – Speaking Alone, Bangkok, 2009
- Myanmar Contemporary Art Festival, Landon, 2010
- Multimedia Art festival, Yangon, 2010
- Blend the World, Copenhagen, 2010
- Blue Wind Contemporary art Exhibition, Yangon, 2009
- We are Burma, Berkeley, USA, 2009

== Personal life ==
Phyu Mon married artist Chan Aye in 1985.
