= Mongol invasions of Burma =

There were two wars known as the Mongol invasions of Burma:

- The First Mongol invasion of Burma (1277–1287)
- The Second Mongol invasion of Burma (1300–1301)
