= San Hlaing =

Burmese artist (1923–2015)

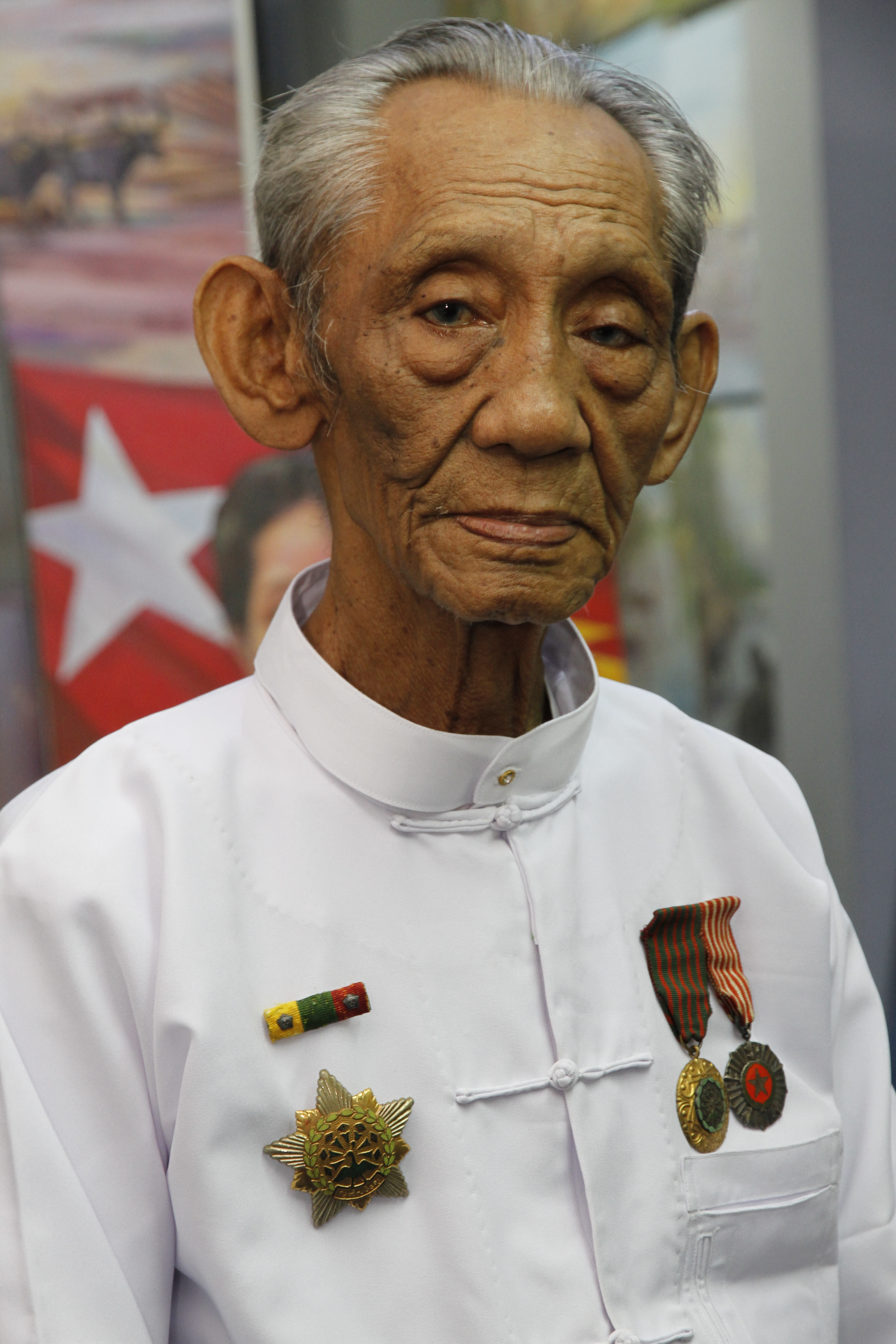
San Hlaing

San Hlaing (Burmese: စန်းလှိုင်; 24 December 1923 – 15 December 2015) was a Burmese artist born in Pyapon, Ayeyarwady Region, Myanmar. He was a versatile artist who not only illustrated the traditional, but also commercial arts. He drew traditional Jataka Tales Paintings, propaganda paintings and drawings in the realism style. He was the designer of the flag of Myanmar used from 1974 to 2010.

== Biography ==
San Hlaing was born to U Khant and Daw Tint on 24 December 1923. He was the fifth child in a family of seven.

When he was younger, he attended Pyapon U Po Thit School and finished the English-Myanmar seventh grade there. Because his passion in painting began at an early age, he studied under Sayar Mhat and artist U Thein Nyunt once he grew up. These two teachers taught him how to paint in both oil and watercolor. In Yangon, he studied under artists Ngwe Gaing and Hla Maung Gyi. At the age of 14, his elder brother acquainted him with U Ba Tun from the British Burma Films Company and U Aung Zan of A-1 Films to learn film posters and advertising under the supervision of U Aung Zan. His career as an artist began when he was 13 or 15 years old.

=== Military career ===
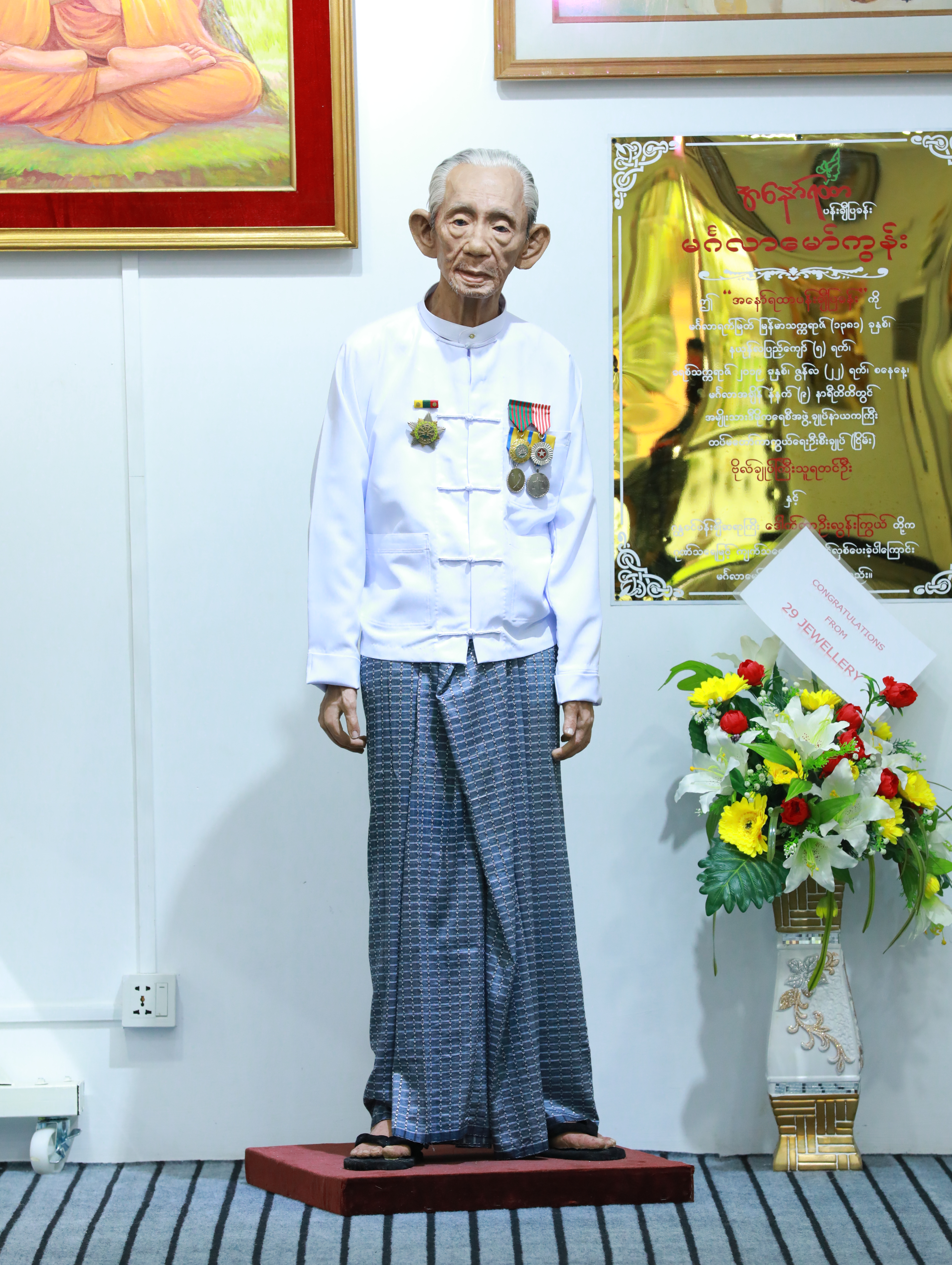
Portrait silicone sculpture of U San Hlaing exhibited at Anawrahta Art Gallery

When the Second World War spread to Myanmar, he joined the Burmese Defense Army (BDA) in Pyapon. In 1943, his posting was in the office of the Yangon War Minister. He was on sentry duty at the guard post. From there, he was sent to Mingaladon Training Corps. He took part in Yangon Conquest Fighting and Sittaung Plateau Fighting. After the war, he went back to Pyapon and continued painting. In February 1946, he joined the armed forces again. After nearly a year, he quit the armed forces. He joined the people's Comrade Corps, which was led by Bo Gyoke Aung San. He became the General Secretary of the People's Comrade Corps in Pyapon.

After his marriage with Daw Tin Aung in 1947, he joined the Regiment, led by commanding officer Bo Minn Gaung. He served nearly one year as a port of sergeant. Then quitted and founded " San Hlaing's Art Studio" in the 27th street, Yangon and started his career as a professional artist from then onwards. In 1956, he held the exhibition in Jubilee Hall, Yangon. In 1958–59, the Burma Artist Union's chairman was Ba Khin and an Hlaing served as the committee member.

=== Socialist Burma ===
Flag of Myanmar (1974–2010), designed by San Hlaing

In 1964, he served as an artist (First Class) at Lanzin News Branch, Education Department of Burma Socialist Programme Party Headquarters. He had designed many insignias and emblems for the workers, peasants, and youth organizations. He was also called an "honorable legendary artist" in the Myanmar painting world. He is a versatile artist who not only illustrated traditional and commercial arts but also drew traditional Jataka Tales paintings, propaganda paintings, and realism drawings. He also created paintings of Myanmar culture and the fascist revolution as he portrayed the political situation of the past.

In the special issues of Taing lone Kyaw and Myanma Alin Newspaper, all the covers were of his paintings. Shumawa, Mgwe Taryi, Pe Phu Hlwar, Magaythi, Yadanarmon, Myatsumon magazines, Loke Thar, Pyi Thu Kye, Khit Myanmar, Byar Deik Pan, Taya Yeik, Myaing Journals, and San Hlaing works were seen monthly and consecutively.

=== Later life and death ===
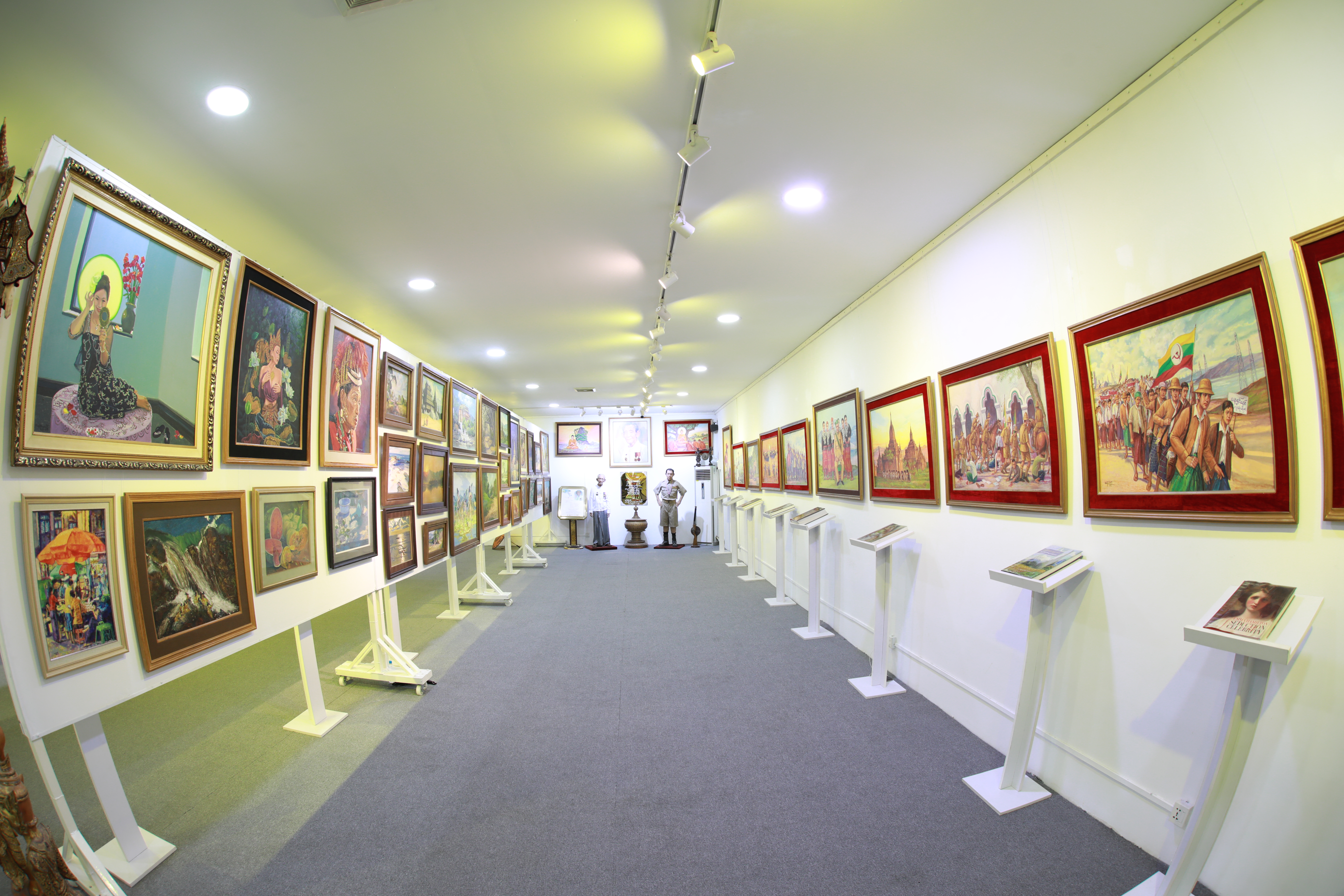
Portrait silicone sculpture of U San Hlaing exhibited at Anawrahta Art Gallery.

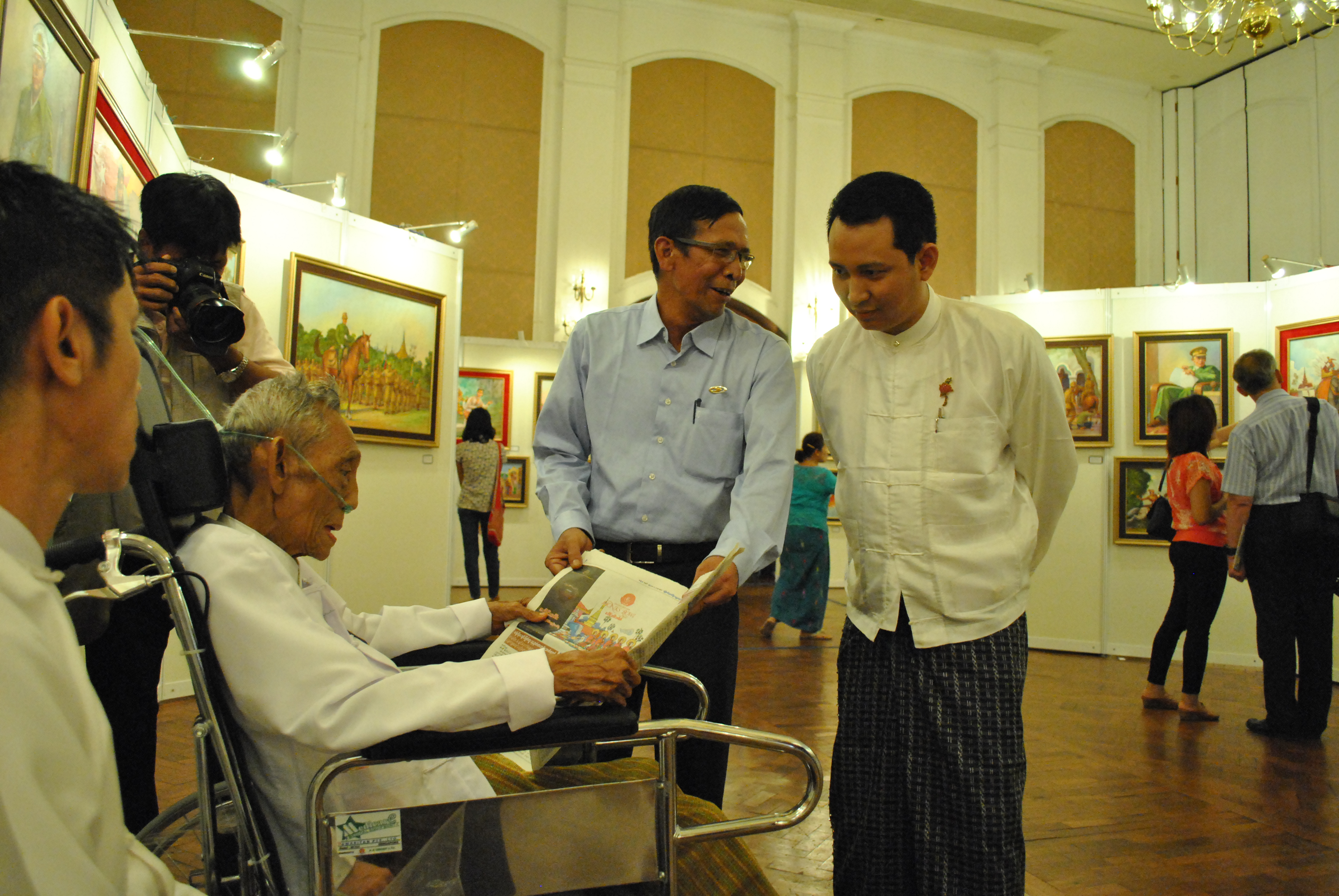
U San Hlaing at his final art exhibition at The Strand Hotel, Yangon (December 18, 2005), engaging with his artwork catalog while in a wheelchair. This historic moment marks the celebration of his legacy in traditional Burmese art, proudly supported by Anawrahta Art Gallery.

He died on December 15, 2015, at the age of 93, following a two-day solo art exhibition by Master U San Hlaing at the Strand Hotel in Yangon on November 17 and 18, 2015. He was the oldest Myanmar artist who had continued to paint until his death at the age of 93. In honor of the legendary painter U San Hlaing, the family conserved and collected priceless items after his death, including more than 400 oil, watercolor, and pen and ink paintings. Establishing and opening a modest art museum was their goal. Firstly, the Anawrahta Art Gallery was founded under the direction of his grandson, U Myo Thaw, and a committee of seasoned artists was formed to oversee the gallery. The grand opening was meticulously planned.
