= Nyein Chan Su =

Burmese painter

- ငြိမ်းချမ်းဆု
- Born: Nyein Chan Su; 1973 (age 52–53); Rangoon, Myanmar
- Died: 24/2/2020; Yangon
- Education: State School of Fine Arts
- Known for: Painter

Nyein Chan Su, known as NCS (Burmese: ငြိမ်းချမ်းဆု; born 1973) is a Burmese painter. He showcases works inspired by nats, the spirits worshipped in central Burma alongside Buddhism. His paintings are eclectic and versatile. He is a co-founder of an artist-run space, Studio Square Art Gallery.

== Early life ==
Nyein was born on 1973 in Rangoon, Myanmar. In 1994. He graduated from the State School of Fine Arts (Yangon) and studied under artists Kyaw Lay, Mya Aye, Sayoe, Tin Aye (MDY), Thit Lwin Soe and Hlaing Bwa. He started his painting career in 2006 and collected photographs of his aunt from family albums, old newspapers and old film posters.

== Career ==
He participated in several shows inside Myanmar as well as in Japan, Hong Kong, Singapore, and Thailand. His participation in the 1999 Fukuoka Art Triennale in Japan launched his international art career.

Nyein Chan Su’s artworks are in the permanent collections of the Singapore Art Museum, the Fukuoka Art Museum as well as in private collections in Europe and Asia.

In 2013, he held a solo exhibition at the Societe Generale Gallery at the Alliance Francaise of Singapore.

Nyein plans a solo exhibition titled “In Past Journeys: 1970s” at Studio Square Art Gallery in Pearl Condominium from October 12 to 20, 2019. His show features 12 large photographs printed on vinyl, with highlight added using acrylic ink. Nyein Chan Su’s artwork Spirituality in High Spirits is on display in Burma’s commercial capital, a series of acrylic and canvas renditions each turn on its head the traditional depiction of nats as foreboding and reproachful figures.

== Awards ==
- 2011 Gold Fish, Video Art, Nominated Artworks of Signature Art Prize 2011 by Singapore Art Museum
- 2010 Highly Commended, Myanmar National Portrait Awards 2011, Organized by River Gallery, Yangon, Myanmar
- 2004 2nd Prize, Myanmar Contemporary Art Awards, Myanmar Times, Myanmar
- 2001 Certificate of Recognition, Philip Morris Group of Companies ASEAN Art Award

== Selected exhibitions ==
=== Group exhibition ===
- Aye Ko, Aung Myint, Phyu Mon, Burma – Speaking Alone, Bangkok, 2009
