= Wah Nu =

Burmese artist

- ဝါနု
- Born: 1977 (age 48–49); Yangon, Myanmar
- Occupation: Artist

Wah Nu is a contemporary artist from Myanmar, known for her introspective approach to art that intertwines personal narratives with broader cultural themes. Her works often explore themes of memory, identity, and the passage of time, utilizing mediums such as painting and video. Collaborating with her husband, artist Tun Win Aung, she has gained international recognition, with her works featured in prominent exhibitions and collections worldwide.

== Early life and education ==
Wah Nu was born in 1977 in Yangon, Myanmar. In 1998, she graduated from the University of Culture, Yangon where she majored in music.

== Career ==
After graduating, she launched herself on an artistic career. Since then, she has developed a personal expression by mainly adopting painting and video as media.

In 2004, she held her first solo exhibition “Cloud Department” in Yangon and showed in group exhibitions including Bangladesh Biennale. She also showed her second solo exhibition “Self-Identity” in the Art-U room gallery, Tokyo, Japan and participated in group exhibitions, Fukuoka Triennale in 2005.

In 2008, she participated in a group exhibition in Another Seven Artists in Yangon. In 2009, she participated with her husband, artist, Tun Win Aung in The 6th Asia Pacific Triennial of Contemporary Art in Brisbane.

== Selected exhibitions ==
=== Selected solo exhibitions ===
- 2020 Wah Nu: Clouds, Richard Koh Fine Art, Singapore
- 2008 Wah Nu: The Rising Sun, Art-U room, Shibuya-ku, Tokyo, Japan
- 2005 Wah Nu: Self-Identity, Art-U room, Shibuya-ku, Tokyo, Japan
- 2004 Wah Nu: Cloud Department, Lokanat Galleries, Yangon, Myanmar

=== Selected group exhibitions ===
- 2019 Montage of the Time - Expansion of Video Art in Asia, Fukuoka Asian Art Museum, Fukuoka, Japan
- 2018 Hakarie Contemporary Art Eye Vol. 10 - Eight Contemporary Artists from Southeast Asia, Cube 1 2 3, Tokyo, Japan
- 2017 Beyond Narrative, Wizaya Cinema, Yangon, Myanmar
- 2011 Inner Voices, 21st Century Museum of Contemporary Art, Kanazawa, Japan

=== Selected collective solo exhibitions ===
- 2018 Sound Weaving, National Museum, Yangon, Myanmar
- 2016 Blurring the Boundaries (2007-2012), Chan + Hori Contemporary, Singapore
- 2011 Tun Win Aung and Wah Nu, Meulensteen Gallery, Chelsea, New York, USA
- 2011 Tun Win Aung and Wah Nu: Some Pieces (of White), Art-U room, Shibuya-ku, Tokyo, Japan

=== Selected collective group exhibitions ===
- 2016 An Atlas of Mirrors, Singapore Biennale 2016, Singapore Art Museum, Singapore
- 2015 Convergence, The National Gallery, Bangkok, Thailand
- 2013 No Country: Contemporary Art for South and Southeast Asia, Solomon R. Guggenheim Museum, New York, United States
- 2011 Back to the Museum Per Se, The 4th Guangzhou Triennial, Guangdong Museum of Modern Art, Guangzhou, China

== Public collections ==
- Fukuoka Asian Art Museum, Fukuoka, Japan
- Solomon R. Guggenheim Museum, New York, United States
- Kadist, San Francisco, United States
- Centre Pompidou, Paris, France
- Queensland Art Gallery / Gallery of Modern Art, Brisbane, Australia
- Singapore Art Museum, Singapore

== Personal life ==
Wah Nu is married to artist Tun Win Aung, who works in multimedia installations and performance arts.
