= Yei Myint =

- ရဲမြင့်
- Born: 1953 (age 72–73); Myingyan, Burma
- Known for: Painting

MPP Yei Myint (Burmese: ရဲမြင့်, pronounced [jɛ́ mjɪ̰ɰ̃]; also spelled Ye Myint; born 1953) is a Burmese artist. He was born in 1953 in Myingyan and studied at the State School of Fine Arts in Mandalay. Yei Myint is a student of Win Pe, who taught at this school. He was one of two Burmese artists who participated in the 1999 Philip Morris ASEAN Art Awards. He is one of the most recognized artists in Myanmar. He stands out as an important contemporary artist in Myanmar for his innovative use of visual vocabulary.

Yei Myint creates drawings, paintings and collages with a variety of styles. His innovative paintings use bold brush strokes. He is known for a series where he juxtaposed Vincent van Gogh, whom he admires, with images of Bagan, the ancient capital of Burma. He has exhibited in Burma, Japan (1995, 1999), Singapore (1996, 1998, 2005), Taiwan (1996), Malaysia (1997, 1999), Germany (1999) and Finland (2001). His work is exhibited by the Singapore Art Museum, the National Art Gallery of Malaysia and the Fukuoka Asian Art Museum, Japan.

== Museum Collections ==
- Fukuoka Asian Art Museum
- Singapore Art Museum
- National Art Gallery (Malaysia)
