= Min Wae Aung =

Burmese contemporary artist

- မင်းဝေအောင်
- Born: 1960 (age 65–66); Danubyu, Myanmar
- Education: Studies at the State School of Fine Arts, Rangoon
- Known for: Painter

Min Wae Aung (Burmese: မင်းဝေအောင်; born 1960) is an international contemporary artist from Myanmar whose realistic work is characterized by its strong relationship to Burmese culture and Buddhist philosophy. He is the owner of New Treasure Art Gallery in Yangon's Golden Valley.

== Biography ==
Min Wae Aung was born in 1960 in Danubyu, Ayeyarwady Region. He lives with his wife, Than Than, and their two teenage sons in Yangon. He studied at the State School of Fine Arts in Yangon.
