= Wathone =

- ဝသုန်
- Born: Khin Hla; 1 December 1947; Rangoon, British Burma
- Died: 21 October 2008 (aged 60); Thingangyun Township, Yangon, Myanmar
- Occupation: Artist
- Spouse: San Aye
- Children: Four

Wathone (Burmese: ဝသုန်, lit. "Earth" from Pali vasundra), born Khin Hla, was a prominent Burmese painter, best known for his watercolor and batik paintings. He was the subject of a documentary called A Sketch of Wathone, directed by Kyi Phyu Shin, which won the best shorts award at the National Geographic Society's 2008 All Roads Film Festival. He died at his home in Thingangyun Township, Yangon, in 2008.
