= Htein Lin (artist) =

Burmese artist (born 1966)

- ထိန်လင်း
- Born: 31 December 1966 (age 59); Ingapu, Ayeyarwady Region, Myanmar
- Known for: Painting
- Spouse: Vicky Bowman
- Children: 1

Htein Lin (Burmese: ထိန်လင်း, IPA: [tʰèiɰ̃ lɪ́ɰ̃]; born 31 December 1966) is a Burmese painter, performance artist, and writer.

== Early life ==
Htein Lin was born in Ingapu, Ayeyarwady Region in Burma. From 1985, he studied for a Bachelor of Law (LLB) degree at Yangon University. Together with other students, he was expelled in 1988 for protesting about the lack of investigation into the death of Hpone Maw prior to the 8888 uprising.

Following involvement with protests, Htein Lin, together with other activists, withdrew to camps on the border with India. Here he became a member of the All Burma Students' Democratic Front (ABSDF), opposed to the Burmese military regime. During this period, he studied with the artist Sitt Nyein Aye from Mandalay, learning about western artists such as Pablo Picasso and Vincent van Gogh. He used his skills to add illustrations the publications of the ABSDF. Moving to Pajau ABSDF camp in Kachin State near the Chinese border, he and other students were detained for around 9 months from 1991-1992 and suffered physical abuse at the hands of other students in the most notorious episode of the opposition group’s history, which he wrote about in his autobiography Ma Pa and appeared as a comic book (Pajau) by Wooh. After escaping in May 1992 from the camp, and returning to Yangon, Htein Lin continued his law degree in 1993, which he completed in 1994.

== Artistic career ==
Instead of working in the legal profession, Htein Lin became an artist and also an actor in comic films (as "Htein Htein") in the mid 1990s. He led the way with modern Burmese performance art. His artistic performances included The Little Worm in the Ear, in Yangon, and Guitarist in 1996.

Htein Lin spent 6½ years as a political prisoner in Burma from 1998-2004. He continued to perform for fellow inmates in prison. Officially, he was not permitted to paint while imprisoned. However, he managed to produce several hundred paintings secretly, using white cotton prison uniforms, as well as about a thousand drawings. He bribed the prison guards to smuggle paint to him, but it was too dangerous to have a paintbrush in his cell. Instead, he used various objects that were available to him, including cigarette lighters, pieces of glass, plates, nets, razor blades, syringes, or simply his fingers and hands. He used a monoprint technique.

After his release from prison in 2004, he returned to art and performance. His May 2005 Rangoon street performance entitled Mobile Art Gallery/Mobile Market meant he was interrogated by the authorities again.

He was introduced in 2005 to the British Ambassador in Yangon, Vicky Bowman, who took receipt of his prison paintings and ensured their preservation by loaning them to the Burma Archives Project at the International Institute of Social History in Amsterdam. He later married Bowman and they moved to live in London for seven years.

During his time in the UK, Htein Lin undertook performance art in Trafalgar Square, central London, on 1 June 2008.

He also had exhibitions and performed in Finland, France, Norway, Thailand, Czech Republic and the United States of America. In addition, he has performed at the 2007 Venice Biennale and at festivals in Finland, Japan, Malaysia, and the Philippines. His performances draw on his artistic life as well as aiming to raise awareness of the Burmese political situation.

Htein Lin has continued to use the monoprint technique in his subsequent paintings. These draw on his Theravada Buddhist faith, Burmese symbols and traditions, his early experience as a comedian in "anyeint" satirical performances, and events such as Cyclone Nargis and the Saffron Revolution.

In 2013, Htein Lin returned to live in Rangoon, and commenced his project A Show of Hands Project. In 2014 he returned one week in prison to train prisoners to Vipassana meditation and monoprint painting techniques In November 2015, Htein Lin campaigned in the delta area for the National League for Democracy of Aung San Suu Kyi and his native township Ingapu.

In the aftermath of the 2021 Myanmar coup d'état, he was reportedly detained in Yangon on 24 August 2022, along with his wife Vicky Bowman, and charged with immigration offences. PEN America called for his immediate release. He was released in November 2022, as part of a mass pardon to mark National Day.

== Exhibitions ==
Htein Lin has exhibited at the following solo and group shows:

- Ingenuity, Richard Koh Fine Art, Singapore, November - December 2026
- Angels & Mara, Bangkok Art Biennale 2026, Bangkok, October 2026 - February 2027
- Zootopia, West Eden, Bangkok, Thailand, October - December 2026
- Ek kha ya, West Eden, Bangkok, Thailand, August - October 2025
- 'Escape', IKON Birmingham, March - June 2025
- Solo and group shows in France, l'Isle sur la Sorgue, 2017, 2019, 2025
- Solo and group shows in Rangoon, Burma, 1996, 1997, 2005, 2006
- Burma: Inside Out, Asia House, London, UK, July - October 2007 (prison paintings)
- Asian Attitudes (group show), National Museum, Poznań, Poland, July 2007
- Beyond Burma (group show), Chocolate Factory, London, UK, February 2008
- 20 Years On, Suwunnabhumi Gallery, Chiang Mai, March 2008
- The Cell, Karin Weber Gallery, Hong Kong, March 2008
- Out Of Burma, Quest Gallery, Bath, UK, May–July 2008
- Crossings (group show), Olson Gallery, Northern Illinois University, DeKalb, Illinois, United States, August - October 2008
- 00235, Carcere le Nuove, Turin, Italy, October 2008 (prison paintings)

== Family ==
He is married to the former British Ambassador to Myanmar, Vicky Bowman, and they have one daughter.

== Legacy ==
The US Embassy in Yangon has acquired two paintings by Htein Lin. Other works are held in private collections in Belgium, Hong Kong, the Netherlands, Singapore, Spain, Sweden, Thailand, the United Kingdom, and the United States.

The International Institute of Social History in Amsterdam holds Htein Lin's papers.

== Bibliography ==
- Ko Ko Thett (2008-07-15). "Htein Lin: A Moving Monument". The Irrawaddy. Archived from the original on 2011-12-24.
- Perlez, Jane (2007-08-13). "From a Burmese Prison, a Chronicle of Pain in Paint". The New York Times. ISSN 0362-4331.
- "The way I see it: Htein Lin". New Statesman. 2007-07-26. Archived from the original on 2016-05-06.
- "A prisoner's tale". The Economist. 2007-08-04. ISSN 0013-0613.
- Gaudoin, Tina (2007-07-21). "Coolhunter: Htein Lin". The Times. ISSN 0140-0460.

== See also ==
- Burmese contemporary art
