= Aung Myint =

Burmese painter and performance artist

- အောင်မြင့်
- Born: 27 October 1946 (age 79); British Burma
- Known for: Painting
- Movement: Burmese contemporary art

Aung Myint (Burmese: အောင်မြင့်, pronounced [ʔàʊɰ̃ mjɪ̰ɰ̃]; born 27 October 1946) is a Burmese painter and performance artist. He is considered a pioneer in experimental art, rejecting traditional romanticism and confronting social and critical issues through a range of distinctive styles and media.

== Life ==
Aung Myint was born on 27 October 1946, and attended the Rangoon Arts and Science University, graduating in 1968 with a major in psychology. A self-taught painter, Aung Myint began to exhibit his work in the 1960s. He became a leading figure in Yangon's contemporary art scene. Aung Myint co-founded The Inya Gallery of Art. In 1995, he made his first stage performance with the work Beginning n End. Aung Myint had his first solo exhibition in his Inya Gallery of Art in 1994, and since then has held many more in Yangon. He has also had solo exhibitions in Tokyo, Germany, Singapore and New York City. He co-authored the book Myanmar Contemporary Art 1 with Aung Min.

== Work ==
Aung Myint's paintings, installation art and performance art have a broad range of unique styles. Although he is interested in the work of artists such as Willem de Kooning and Jackson Pollock, he refuses to categorize his work in terms of "isms". His work includes both representational and abstract images. In the mid-1960s his work was semi-abstract, with cubist elements. This evolved through a period in the 1970s and 1980s when he "fragmented" his images, and then into a highly emotional style in the 1990s with splashing, smearing and dripping of paint in strokes, which strongly evoked the works of Jackson Pollock's "action paintings" but also derived its inspiration from the circle and swirls of the Myanmar alphabet. Other painters of the American New York School of the post-war period, such as de Kooning, have influenced his work where in harrowing portraits the features of faces are tortured and twisted. But Aung Myint also reaches back into Burmese painting history for inspiration. In an unusual and provocative piece done in 2001 entitled Five Continents, he filled the bottom of the painting with images of Edvard Munch's "scream faces", in rows, as effigies of the Buddha might appear on the walls of Bagan temples. The upper portion of the painting was divided into five panels dripping in violent red paint."

His more recent monochromatic drawings of mother and child are well known in Southeast Asia. According to Steven Pettifor, "the works are skillfully made using a single flowing line that conveys the artist's emotions and mood. These drawings are rooted in feelings of loss and abandonment from the death of his mother when the artist was an infant. The works also evoke the fluid line and form of works by such modernist masters as Henry Moore and Pablo Picasso". The "flowing line" in such works derives from one-line painting, a term which in Burma refers to a technique used in the mural works of Bagan and on into the Traditional painting of the early 20th century. In one-line painting an image is not painted in short strokes or dabs as is often the case in Western painting, but in a single flowing line from beginning to end.

The "Mother and Child" series won the "Jurors' Choice Award" at the ASEAN Art Award in Bail.

Aung Myint's work is held in the Singapore Art Museum, Fukuoka Asian Art Museum, National Art Gallery (Malaysia) and in private collections in Singapore, Japan, Thailand, Germany, Netherlands, Hungary, Australia and the United States.

== Awards and honors ==
- 2002 PEN/Barbara Goldsmith Freedom to Write Award

== Museum Collections ==
- Fukuoka Asian Art Museum
- Singapore Art Museum
- National Art Gallery (Malaysia)
- Solomon R. Guggenheim Museum

== See also ==
- Aung Soe
- New York School Painters
