= National Art Gallery (Malaysia) =

Art gallery in Kuala Lumpur, Malaysia

Coordinates: 3.173525°N 101.705208°E

- Balai Seni Negara بالاي سني نڬارا
- The Balai
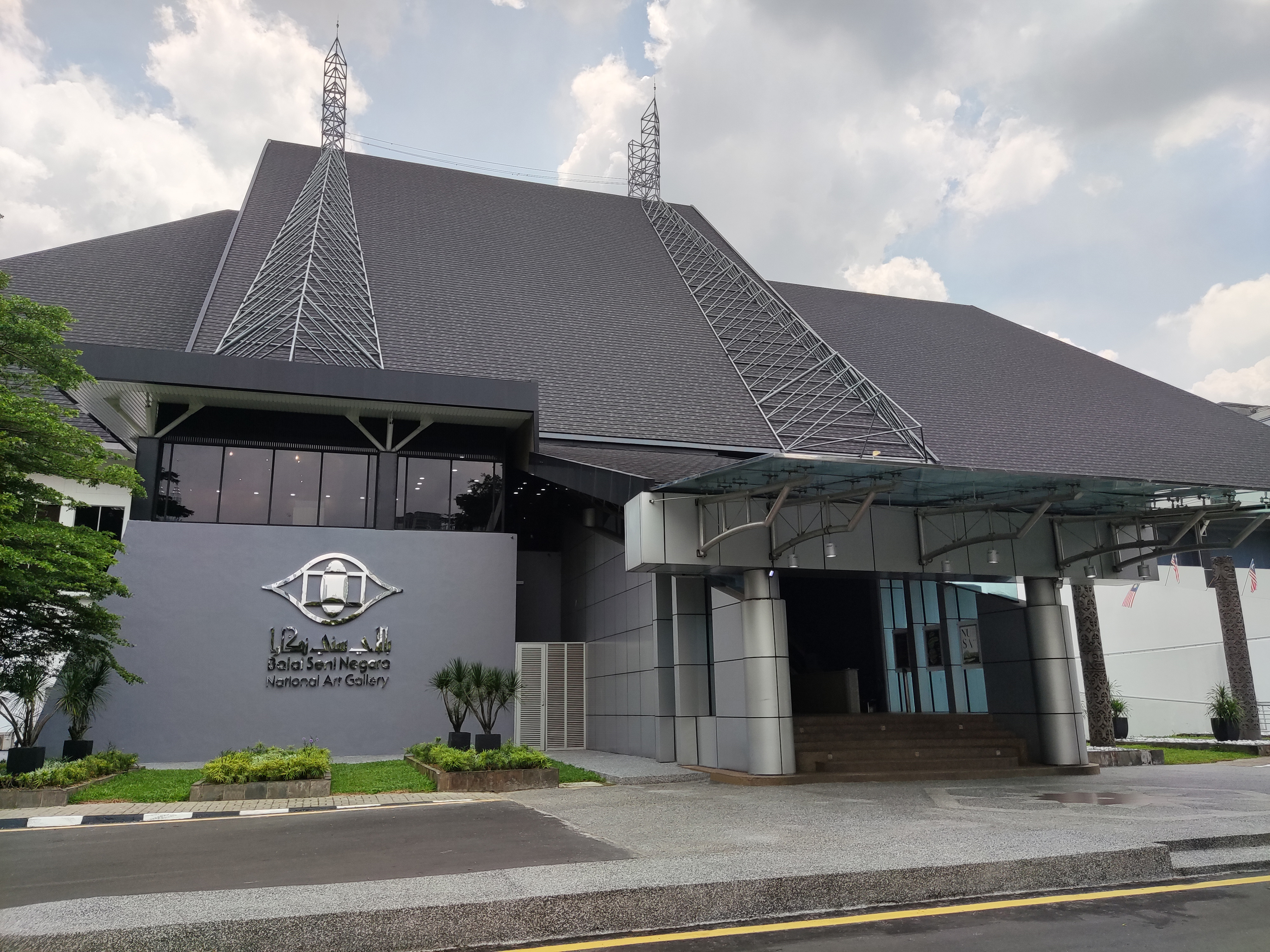
- Interactive map of National Art Gallery
- Full name: Balai Seni Negara / National Art Gallery
- Former names: Balai Seni Lukis Negara (1958-1977) Muzium Seni Negara (1978-1980) Balai Seni Lukis Negara (1981-2010) Balai Seni Visual Negara (2011-2017)
- Address: No 2 Jalan Temerloh off Jalan Tun Razak 53200 Kuala Lumpur
- Location: Kuala Lumpur, Malaysia
- Owner: The Government of Malaysia
- Operator: National Visual Art Development Board
- Type: Art gallery public art museum
- Acreage: 5.67 acre
- Public transit: PY18 Hospital Kuala Lumpur MRT station

Construction
- Built: own building built by YTL Corporation 1996-1998
- Opened: officially launched first exhibition 27 August 1958 at 109 Jalan Ampang own building opened 27 September 2000 at Jalan Temerloh off Jalan Tun Razak
- Renovated: after 3 September 1999
- Expanded: 2000 Public Art Competition for sculptures in and around the National Art Gallery building
- Cost: MYR40 million
- Architects: MAA Akitek, Dato' Mir Shahriman
- Main contractor: YTL Corporation

The National Art Gallery of Malaysia (Malay: Balai Seni Negara; Jawi: بالاي سني نڬارا) is a public art gallery in Kuala Lumpur, Malaysia.

The gallery is situated along Jalan Tun Razak, on the northern edge of central Kuala Lumpur. It is located next to the Istana BudayaMalaysia's main venue for all types of theatre including musical theatre, operetta, classical concerts and opera from local and international performances. As of today, this art agency, a statutory body under the Ministry of Tourism Art and Culture is simply known as the "National Art Gallery".

The 'National Art Gallery' was designed by Dato' Ar. Mir Shariman of Arkitek MAA Sdn Bhd, with gallery spaces flanking the circular ramp serve as exhibition areas for more intimate and contemplative viewing. Spiral ramp in the middle provides dynamic visual experience to visitors from different angles at every level.

== History ==
The Arts Council of the Federation of Malaya formed by the then senior civil servant Mubin Sheppard in 1952, had been put to task by the Federal Government 'to encourage and develop a greater knowledge, understanding and practice of the Arts in the Federation of Malaya'. In 1958 the council was asked to name a committee to establish a National Art Gallery . The working Committee functioned for several years until in 1963 that a newly appointed Board of trustees was convened . The first Chairman appointed was Professor Ungku Aziz and the Deputy Chairman was P.G. Lim.

The first exhibition on 28 August 1958, by Tunku Abdul Rahman, the first Prime Minister of Malaysia as the Balai Seni Lukisan Negara or 'National Art Gallery. The gallery which was established since 1958, had thrived for 25 years in a temporary abode at the Dewan Tunku Abdul Rahman, the country's first House of Parliament on the site known today as the Malaysian Tourism Center .

The Balai changed its name to the National Visual Arts Gallery in 2011 with the establishment of the National Visual Art Development Board Act of 2011 (Act 724) the Akta Lembaga Pembangunan Seni Visual Negara 2011.The Balai is also a statutory body and an agency under the Ministry of Tourism, Art and Culture, of Malaysia.

== Transportation ==
The gallery is accessible via Rapid KL bus route 402.

It is also within walking distance from the Hospital Kuala Lumpur MRT station on the Putrajaya Line.

== See also ==
- List of national galleries
- Malacca Art Gallery

== Literature ==
- Lenzi, Iola (2004). Museums of Southeast Asia. Singapore: Archipelago Press. pp. 200 pages. ISBN 981-4068-96-9.
- Anuar, Zanita; et al. (2013). 55 Years National Visual Arts Gallery. Kuala Lumpur: National Visual Art Gallery. pp. 218 pages. ISBN 978-983-3497-87-4.
- Lim, PG (2012). Kaleidoscope: The Memoirs of PG Lim. Selangor: Strategic Information and research development Centre. pp. 397 pages. ISBN 978-967-5832-39-0.
- Mohd Tahir, Badrolhisham; et al. (2018). Membingkai Semula:60 Tahun Balai Seni Negara. Kuala Lumpur: National Art Gallery. pp. 192 pages. ISBN 978-967-0914-24-4.
