= Tin Tin Nwet =

Burmese film actress

- တင်တင်နွဲ့
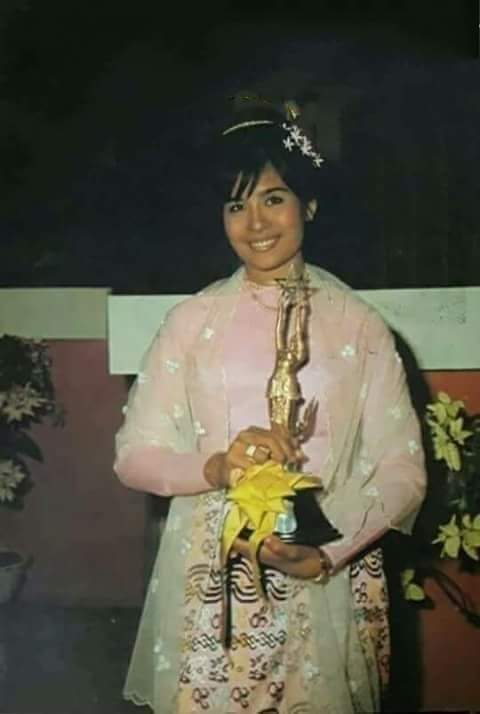
- Tin Tin Nwet at the Myanmar Academy Awards Ceremony in 1971
- Born: 9 December 1944; Rangoon, British Burma
- Died: 10 November 2015 (aged 70); Yangon General Hospital, Yangon, Myanmar
- Occupation: Actress
- Years active: 1963–1978
- Spouse: Thet Htun (m. 1970; died 2015)
- Children: Soe Thura Htun (son); Zarni Win Htun (? – 2009) (son)
- Parent(s): U Kyaw Yin (father); Daw Tin Yone (mother)
- Awards: Myanmar Motion Picture Academy Awards (Best Actress Award for 1970)

Tin Tin Nwet (Burmese: တင်တင်နွဲ့; 9 December 1944 – 10 November 2015) was a Burmese actress. She won Best Actress Award in the 1970 Myanmar Motion Picture Academy Awards. She had acted as a leading actress in about 43 Burmese films.

== Early life ==
Tin Tin Nwet was born on 9 December 1944 to parents, U Kyaw Yin and Daw Tin Yone in Yangon, Burma during British rule. She attended at B.E.H.S (1) Kyeemyindaing.

== Career ==
She started her career with the film Myat, directed by Chit Khin alongside Win Oo, Myint Myint Khin and Chit Sabal.

Tin Tin Nwet acted with stars contemporary actors such as Win Oo, Nyunt Win, Kyi Soe, Win Nyunt, Twante Thein Tan, Aung Lwin, Kawleikgyin Ne Win, Sein Myint, Soe Naing, Lin Htin, Zaw Lin, Kyaw Hein, Khin Maung Htwe, Soe Shwe, Htun Wai, Win Swe, Lin Aung, Zaw Lwin, Khin Maung Chin, Wah Wah Win Shwe, Khin Than Nu, Khin Yu May, San Shar Tin, Aye Aye Thin, San San Aye, Thi Thi, Sandar, Swe Zin Htaik, Yin Yin Aye, Soe Myat Thuzar. Due to the natural tone of the voice, compassion was used in dramas.

During the Cassette era, she co-starred with Kawleikgyin Ne Win in the radio drama Bo Aung Din and appeared on several popular radio broadcasts. The cassette stories of Tin Tin Nwet, Kawleikgyin Ne Win and Danu Phyu Kyi Kyi Thein, organized by Director Maung Kyay Mone and Gandawin Maung Wine was well known in the world of radio dramas.

Among the films starring Tin Tin Nwet, Zagar Pyaw Thaw Athel Hnalone, Kyun Ma Mhar Main Ma Thar, Nan Ta Lain Pan Ta Lain, Chit Thu Yway Mal Chit Wae Lal, Shwe Dakhar Gyi Phwint Par Oo, Mayar Htaung Chauk, Myat, Myitta Pearl Thwe, Chit Oo Tain Pan Chi, Saydanar Man Thaw Kantayar, La Kwal Moe Hnaung, A Pyet Ma Pyaw Nae Ma Chaw, Sunt Sar Chin A Tu Tu Bal Thu Myat Tha Lae, U Paung Sin Nae Myin Nyo Shin, Maung Ma Ma Nyein, Taung Pyar Tan and Pan Thazin films were popular. She won Best Actress Award in the 1970 Myanmar Motion Picture Academy Awards for the film Kyun Ma Mhar Main Ma Thar, directed by Thukha. Filming continued until 1978, after which she stopped filming due to ill health. Tin Tin Nwet had been hospitalized 13 times in Thailand, due to a heart attack. Tin Tin Nwet's last film was Thet Lal, a 1978 film directed by Ko Lin Lin.

== Personal life ==
She was married to Wunna Kyawhtin Thet Htun, who was a Judge of the Supreme Court of Myanmar in 1970. They had two sons, named; Soe Thura Htun and Zarni Win Htun. Her son, Zarni Win Htun died in 2009.

== Death ==
She died at the age of about 71 on 10 November 2015 at the Yangon General Hospital.
