= Win Oo =

Burmese actor, singer, director writer and publisher

- ဝင်းဦး
- Born: Hla Myint; 13 March 1935; Rangoon, British Burma
- Died: 14 December 1988 (aged 53); Yangon, Myanmar
- Other name: Ko Oo
- Occupations: Actor, singer, director, writer and publisher.
- Awards: Myanmar Motion Picture Academy Awards (Best Leading Actor for 1967, 1970)

Win Oo (Burmese: ဝင်းဦး; pronounced [wɪ́ɰ̃ ʔú], 13 March 1935 – 14 December 1988) was a two-time Myanmar Motion Picture Academy Awards winning Burmese actor, singer, director, writer and publisher. He became publicly known for his acting, singing and directing. Win was considered one of the most important actors in history of Burmese cinema. He died of colorectal cancer in 1988.

== Youth ==
Win Oo was born on 13 March 1935 as Hla Myint in Rangoon (now Yangon) to his parents U Ba Nyunt (Chit-Dukkha), a history professor at Rangoon University, and Daw Hnin Yi, as the third of five children. He matriculated at TTC (Practicing High School, passing his 10th standard examinations at the age of 14.) He subsequently attended Rangoon University, where he studied mathematics, economics, and French and wrote short stories under the pen name "Nyo Min Lwin."

In 1952, during his third year, he departed from his university studies and joined the Burmese Army. Win Oo was stationed in Maymyo (now Pyin Oo Lwin) and Meiktila, and spent 9 months in 1959 training in Australia. Upon his return to Burma, he became a more prolific writer, penning nineteen stories in Shumuwa, including a novel, A University Student (တက္ကသိုလ်ကျောင်းသားတစ်ဦး), in 1960. He was honourably discharged from the army as a captain in 1962.

== Career ==
He launched his acting career in 1962, starring in Hna-Yauk Hte Nay-Gyin-De, adapted from his eponymous novel, directed by Tin Yu. But this movie was not his first film. Chit-Thaw-Thu-Ta-Yauk was his first film in cinema but this movie was not commercially successful. He both directed and starred in Saung Einmet and Hmon Shwe Yee. He founded the Sanda movie company, established first "color offset printer" in Burma, established "Sanda Magazine Office" and published Sanda Magazine. He won numerous Myanmar Academy Award for his performances, including Best Actor for Hmon Shwe Yee in 1970. He starred in 27 films, before dying in 1988. He wrote 31 novels. His most famous book is Main ma Hla Ah Mone.

== Legacy ==
He is best known for his image, acting, unusual voice, and way of speaking and singing, which some artists often imitate as a fun way of entertainment, especially in traditional live performances on the stage. The BBC (Myanmar) described that in Myanmar, not many artists have great success beyond their age and grave, and that Win Oo is one of the few whose success and influence extend till these days. The late Hla Htut, a famous Myanmar pianist and composer, remarked that his use of low-pitched, nasal and legato voices in several songs like "Maung Do Cherry Myay" (Our Cherry Land) and his voices of interjection in such songs as "Mee Pon Pwe" (Bonfire) and "Ma Ma Moe" (Lady Moe) were quite distinct and earned his place in the category of remake-western songs in Myanmar. He directed and appeared as an actor in many films; in Ah Twe Ah Tar, an unusual film for that time because no actress appeared; the main roles are a child-actress and him only, and in a self-directed film, Chit Thu Yway Mae` Chit Ware Le` he acted in an octa-role with many actresses, which he even made it successful in spite of lack of high film-technology for that period. Hmon Shwe Yi is one of his prominent works, through which some elements and aspects of Myanmar Stage Performance and Entertainment can be observed. Last but not least, his love for songs by Myoma Nyein and participation in Mandalay Thingyan festival over a decade is still considered to be a cultural icon in Myanmar.

== Filmography ==
Lists of Films
| No. | Year | Film | Co-Stars | Note |
|---|---|---|---|---|
| 1 | 1962 | Chit Thaw Thu Ta Yauk | Khin Than Nu | |
| 2 | 1962 | Hna Yauk Htae Nay Chin Tal | Tin Tin Mu, Daisy Kyaw Win | |
| 3 | 1962 | Mone Ta Hlae Pyone Ta Hlae | Tin Tin Aye | |
| 4 | 1963 | Saung Ta Nya Wal | Wah Wah Win Shwe | |
| 5 | 1963 | Bain Mi Thar Ra | Tin Maung, Kyi Kyi Htay, Kyi Kyi Nyunt | |
| 6 | 1963 | Mharna Takhon | Tin Tin Aye | |
| 7 | 1963 | Padauk Yake Wal | Tin Tin Aye, Hnin Si | |
| 8 | 1963 | Bawa Mattan | Tin Tin Aye | |
| 9 | 1963 | Myat | Myint Myint Khin, Tin Tin Nwet, Chit Sabal | |
| 10 | 1963 | Ta Pwint Tae Pan Mal | Kyi Kyi Htay, Thi Thi | |
| 11 | 1963 | Maung Doh Cherry Myay | Khin Than Nu | |
| 12 | 1963 | E San Eain Wal | Wah Wah Win Shwe | |
| 13 | 1963 | Chit Thaw Mg Mg | Thi Thi | |
| 14 | 1963 | Maung Chawt Myu Pa Mal | Kyi Kyi Htay | |
| 15 | 1963 | Yin Thway Yin Nit | May Thit, Wah Wah Win Shwe | |
| 16 | 1964 | Thit Sar Tu Pyaing | Myint Myint Khin | |
| 17 | 1964 | Bal Yat Htar Nay | Wah Wah Win Shwe | |
| 18 | 1964 | Maung A Chit Taw | Tin Tin Mu, Chit Sabal | |
| 19 | 1964 | Myittar Pan | Myint Myint Khin, Khin Than Nu | |
| 20 | 1964 | Thi Kyar Say Thet Thay Nhyun | Wah Wah Win Shwe, Khin Than Nu | |
| 21 | 1964 | Nyi Nyi Lwin | Wah Wah Win Shwe | |
| 22 | 1965 | Mone May Par Naing | Tin Tin Mu, Thi Thi, Wah Wah Win Shwe, Aung Lwin | |
| 23 | 1965 | Chit Thel | Wah Wah Win Shwe | |
| 24 | 1966 | Su Htoo Nge Pan Ywal Thun | Daisy Kyaw Win, Nwet Nwet San | |
| 25 | 1967 | Yee Sar Da Mya | Khin Than Nu | |
| 26 | 1967 | Maung Maung Nae Theingi | San Shar Tin, San San Win | |
| 27 | 1967 | Hnin Pyauk Tae Nway | Tin Tin Mu, Tin Tin Aye | |
| 28 | 1967 | Saung Einmet | Tin Tin Aye, Aye Aye Thin | |
| 29 | 1968 | Ko Chit Thu Bal Mhar Shi Tal | Khin Than Nu | |
| 30 | 1968 | Thoe | Khin Than Nu | |
| 31 | 1968 | Tein Hlwar Moht Moht Lwin | Myint Myint Khin | |
| 32 | 1969 | Kyaukme A Kyin Thar | Khin Than Nu | |
| 33 | 1970 | Hmone Shwe Yee | Khin Than Nu, Aung Lwin, Po Par Gyi | |
| 34 | 1971 | Ta Kyawt Hna Kyawt Tay Ko Thi | Tin Tin Mya, Cho Pyone | |
| 35 | 1972 | A Twal A Tar | Sandar Lin | |
| 36 | 1973 | Latt Latt | Khin Than Nu | |
| 37 | 1973 | Mone Par Tal Maung Ko | Myint Myint Khin | |
| 38 | 1973 | Pan Myo Taw Tho Chay Lann Lay Sal | Kyaw Swar Win, Cho Pyone | Guest |
| 39 | 1975 | Chit Thu Yway Mal Chit Wae Lal | Myint Myint Khin, Tin Tin Nwet, San San Aye, Myint Myint Khine, Cho Pyone, Nwet Nwet Mu, Sandar | |
| 40 | 1976 | Min Bal Pyay Ma Lae Mi Cho Thel | Sandar | |
| 41 | 1977 | Tein Oo Lay Pyay Maung Ko Say | Khin Yu May, Tin Tin Nwet | |
| 42 | 1980 | Thet Tan Paw Ka Lu Ta Yauk | Khin Than Nu, Aye Aye Thin | |
| 43 | 1981 | Main Ma Nae Yauk Kyar | Myint Myint Khine, Yin Yin Aye | |
| 44 | 1981 | Kyun Taw Pyaw Thaw A Chit A Kyaung | Khin Than Nwe | |
| 45 | 1981 | Myittar Kabar Char Lay Thu | Nwet Nwet Mu | |
| 46 | 1981 | Chit Thu Kyin Thu Myat Noe Thu | Myint Myint Khin, Myint Myint Khine | |
| 47 | 1981 | Zar Ti Thway | Kyi Kyi Htay, Swe Zin Htaik | |
| 48 | 1982 | Yarma Lattkhana Lo A Chit Myo | Swe Zin Htaik | |
| 49 | 1982 | Woot | Kyaw Swar Win, May Win Maung | |
| 50 | 1982 | Moe Palae Yadanar | Saw Mya Thandar, Thidar Win | |
| 51 | 1982 | Hna Yauk Htae Nay Chin Tal | Aye Min Win, Cho Pyone, May Win Maung | Director |
| 52 | 1987 | Ngwe Hlaing Zar Paw Mhar | Kyaw Swar Win, Cho Pyone | |
| 53 | 1992 | Khine Mar Lar Hnin Si | Yan Aung, Khin Than Nu | |

== Awards ==
| Year | Award | Category | Nominated work | Result |
|---|---|---|---|---|
| 1967 | Myanmar Motion Picture Academy Awards | Best Actor | Saung Einmet | Won |
| 1970 | Myanmar Motion Picture Academy Awards | Best Actor | Hmone Shwe Yee | Won |
