= Thet Tan Paw Ka Lu Ta Yauk =

1980 Burmese film

- Burmese: သက်တန်ပေါ်ကလူတယောက်
- Directed by: Tekkatho Win Pe
- Starring: Win Oo; Khin Than Nu; Aung Lwin; Aye Aye Thin
- Production company: Mya Yadanar Film
- Release date: 1980
- Running time: 113 minutes
- Country: Myanmar
- Language: Burmese

Thet Tan Paw Ka Lu Ta Yauk (Burmese: သက်တန်ပေါ်ကလူတယောက်) is a 1980 Burmese black-and-white drama film, directed by Tekkatho Win Pe starring Win Oo, Khin Than Nu, Aung Lwin and Aye Aye Thin.

== Cast ==
- Win Oo
- Khin Than Nu
- Aung Lwin
- Aye Aye Thin
