= Alinkar Kyawswa =

Burmese national honor

Alinkar Kyawswa (Burmese: အလင်္ကာကျော်စွာ) is the highest national honor of recognition of an individual for their artistic skills by the government of Myanmar. From 1949 to 2022, there were about 57 recipients of this award in Myanmar.

There are only over 20 recipients from post-independence parliamentary governments to post-2011 Union governments. In 2022, under the caretaker government formed by the Tatmadaw, 25 people were awarded in March and 8 people were awarded in April. This is the first time in history that many people have been awarded at the same time.

Shwe Man Tin Maung's son Nyunt Win was awarded in March 2022, making them the first father and son who received Alinkar Kyawsaw. Nandawshae Saya Tin's son Shwe Nan Tin was awarded in April 2022, making them the second father and son who received Alinkar Kyawsaw.

== Recipients by year ==
=== 1950 ===
- Thakin Kodaw Hmaing — Burmese poet, writer, and 20th century political leader.

=== 1953 ===
- U Han Pa — hsaing musician
- U Baka Lay — one of the most famous musicians in the Mandalay music industry.
- Sayar Nyein — a modern harpist
- Saw Mya Aye Kyi — musician
- Ngwe Gaing — painter that had a strong influence on the next generation of artists, and his works are now treasured. He was posthumously recognized as one of the greatest painters in Myanmar.
- Shwe Man Tin Maung — traditional dancer

=== 1955 ===
- Ba Maung — hsaing musician
- Shwe Pyi Aye — musician
- Ba Than — Burmese musician
- Ba Gyan (b. 1902) — pioneering Burmese cartoonist; born in Nyaungdon. He created the first cartoon movie released in Burma in 1935. He created the cartoon films Kyetaungwa in 1934 and Athuya in 1935 jointly with cartoonist Hein Son.

=== 1956 ===
- Myoma Nyein (1909–1955) — renowned Burmese musician and composer and a founder of the band Myoma. He was born on 25 January 1909 in Mandalay, British Burma. His father is U Nyi, a goldsmith, and his mother is Daw Chit Oo, a lacquerware merchant.

=== 1958 ===
- San Kho — scenario writer
- A1 Tin Maung — two-time Burmese Academy Award-winning film actor, director, and producer. He was born in Pyay, a small town in Lower Burma during the British colonial rule. He began his film career at age 10 in 1923 while appearing in Taw Myaing Zon Ga Lwan Aung Phan.
- Saw Maung(b. 1900) — prominent figure painter; born and lived in Mandalay.
- Sein Wai Hlyan — Burmese songwriter and singer. He was born the four of six siblings in Shwebo District, Tabuyin, Yinswe Village. His father was U Sein and his mother was Daw Tout.
- Thukha (1910–2005) — six-time Burmese Academy Award-winning film director, writer, songwriter, script writer, film actor, and film producer. He was born in the Ayeyarwady delta in British Burma and began to write poetry as a middle school student.
- U Nu (b. 1902) — writer, author, and director; born in Thegone Township, Pyay District, Myanmar. His father was Moe Aye and his mother was Daw Sein.
- Chin Sein (b. 1910) — Burmese writer and film director and actor; born in Nyaung U, Mandalay Region
- Nyar Na — a Burmese writer, author, and film director.

=== 2016 ===
- Soe Moe – film director
- Zinyaw Maung Maung - film director
- Hinthada Myint Ngwe - composer

=== 2020 ===
- Sein Stine — hsaing musician

=== 2022 ===
==== March ====
- Bogalay Tint Aung - composer, director and writer
- Kyaw Zin Nyunt (Takatho Myat Thu) - writer, Editor-in-Chief
- Kyi Soe Tun - film director
- Lay Myaing - writer
- Dr Khin Maung Nyunt - writer
- Dr Thaw Kaung - writer
- Dr Khin Aye (Maung Khin Min (Danubyu)) - writer
- Tin Hlaing (Laltwinthar Saw Chit) - writer
- Myint Kyi (Takatho Myat Soe) - writer
- Khin Maung Soe (Maung Paw Tun) - writer
- Ko Lay (Innwa GonYi) - writer
- Tinkha (Takatho) - writer
- Kyauk Saung Thar Noe (Maung Thar Noe) - writer
- Than Tun (Thein Than Tun) - writer
- Myint Lwin (Phoe Kyawt) - writer
- Tun Yi (Archaeologist) - writer
- Tin Maung Myint - writer
- Tun Aung Chaing - writer
- Maung Maung Latt (Naung) - writer
- Sein Hlaing (Thura Zaw) - writer
- Cho Cho Tin (Ma Sandar) - writer
- Nyunt Win - actor and son of Shwe Man Tin Maung
- Maung Ko Ko - musician and composer
- Win Oo - actor, singer, director, writer and publisher
- Kawleikgyin Ne Win - film actor and director

==== April ====
- Nandawshae Sayar Tin - composer
- Shwe Taing Nyunt - composer
- Shwe Nan Tin - traditional dancer and son of Nandawshae Sayar Tin
- Twante Thein Tan - songwriter, actor, and film director
- Sandayar Chit Swe - singer-songwriter and pianist
- Sandayar Hla Htut - musician, composer, pianist, singer and writer
- Thu Maung - film actor, singer, writer and film director
- Sein Bo Tint - hsaing musician
