= Bo Ba Ko =

Zayyakyaw Htin Wannakyaw Htin Major Bo Ba Ko
- ဗကို
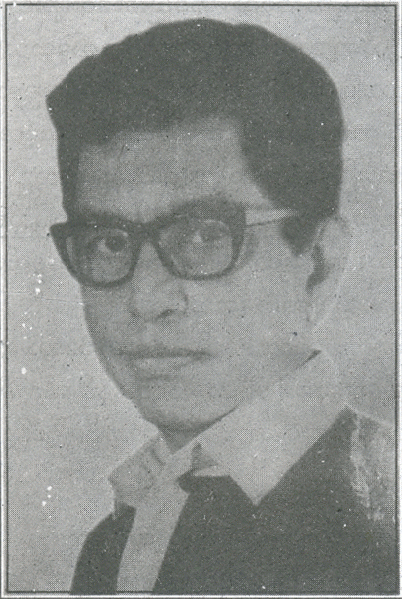

Personal details
- Born: December 11, 1919 Mandalay, Burma
- Died: June 22, 1985 (aged 65) Yangon Myanmar
- Spouse: Khin Kyi(Myanmar)
- Children: 2
- Parent(s): U Thant; Daw Tint
- Education: Yangon University, Yale University
- Occupation: military service, writer, actor, film director, University lecturer
- Known for: Ashike (1983)
- Awards: Zayakyaw Htin, Wanna Kyaw Htin၊ Independence (the second tier); Myanmar Academy Awards(1970,1971)

Bo Ba Ko (Burmese: ဗိုလ်ဗကို) was one of the revolutionary leader in Fascist Japan Revolution and two-time Myanmar Academy Award winning film actor, military service, writer, film director, and University lecturer in Myanmar.

== Early life and education ==
Bo Ba Ko was born on 11 December 1919 in Mandalay to U Than and Daw Tint. In 1941, he achieved the Academy of Arts (Honors) from the University of Yangon by the first phase.

Later he joined the Burmese Independence Army and was involved in the struggle for independence. He had retired as Major army in 1951 after independence. He had been received Zayakyawhtin Medal and Wannakyawhtin Medal by the government.

After, he received a law degree. In 1955, he received a master's degree from The United States Yale University. In 1958, he received the Star of Independence (the second tier) due to be carried out seeking independence.

== Career ==
In Myanmar, he became actor at first Panorama film of Hollywood. In 1970 and 1971, he won the Myanmar Academy Awards for the "Thida Pyone"(Thida smile) and "Turn the World"(Ta Kwae Ta Kabar) movies. Since 1976, he had worked as the vice president of the organizing committee of Film Council, as the external examiner of Yangon University, Mandalay University, Pathein University and Mawlamyine College. And then, he served as Linguistics teacher at the Myanmar Department of University of Yangon.

== Death ==
He died at Yangon on 22 June 1985 at the age of 65.

== Popular movies ==
Lists of Films
Year	Film	Director	Co-Stars
1954	"The People Win Through"		
1969	"Phoo Sar Lan Sone"	Himself	
1970	"Thidar Pyone"		Khin Than Nu, Soe Shwe, Kawleikgyin Ne Win
1971	"Ta Kwae Ta Kabar"		
	"Ta Moe Thout Thaw"		
1981	"Thu Ye Kaung Lay Myar"	Maung Tin Oo	Zaw Wine, May Win Maung, Bo Ba Ko, Aunt Zaw, San Ma Tu, Wine Chuu, Wai Tharli Maung Phone, Dr.Khin Lay Swe, Sein Than, Mya Maung, Nyi Nyi Min
	Saung Einmet		Win Oo, Tin Tin Aye, Aye Aye Thin

== Awards and nominations ==
Year	Award	Category	Nominated work	Result
1970	Myanmar Academy Award	Best Actor	Thidar Pyone	Won
1971	Myanmar Academy Award	Best Actor	Ta Kwe Ta Kabar	Won
