= Mone May Par Naing =

1965 Burmese Film

- Burmese: မုန်းမေ့ပါနိုင်
- Directed by: Win Oo
- Starring: Win Oo; Tin Tin Mu; Thi Thi; Wah Wah Win Shwe; Aung Lwin
- Production company: Sandar Films
- Release date: 1965
- Running time: 110 minutes
- Country: Myanmar
- Language: Burmese

Mone May Par Naing (Burmese: မုန်းမေ့ပါနိုင်) is a 1965 Burmese black-and-white drama film, directed by Win Oo starring Win Oo, Tin Tin Mu, Thi Thi, Wah Wah Win Shwe and Aung Lwin.

== Cast ==
- Win Oo
- Tin Tin Mu
- Thi Thi
- Wah Wah Win Shwe
- Aung Lwin
