= Thi Kyar Say Thet Thay Nhyun =

1964 Burmese Film

- Burmese: သိကြားစေသက်သေညွှန်း
- Directed by: Thukha
- Starring: Win Oo; Wah Wah Win Shwe; Khin Than Nu
- Production company: Bago Films
- Release date: 1964
- Running time: 110 minutes
- Country: Myanmar
- Language: Burmese

Thi Kyar Say Thet Thay Nhyun (Burmese: သိကြားစေသက်သေညွှန်း) is a 1964 Burmese black-and-white drama film, directed by Thukha starring Win Oo, Wah Wah Win Shwe, Than Aung and Khin Than Nu.

== Cast ==
- Win Oo
- Wah Wah Win Shwe
- Than Aung
- Khin Than Nu
- Zeya
- Myint Myint Htay
- Kyauk Lone
- Than Nwet
