= Saung Ta Nya Wal =

1963 Burmese Film

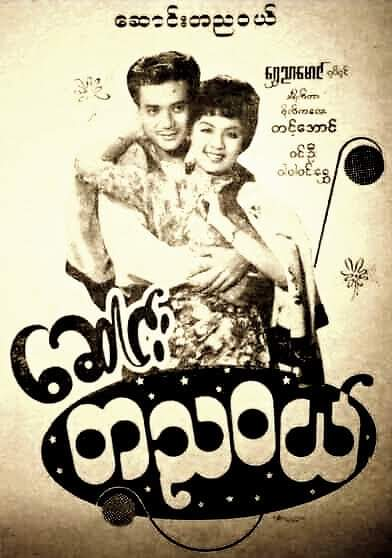
- Film Poster
- Burmese: ဆောင်းတညဝယ်
- Directed by: Bogalay Tint Aung
- Starring: Win Oo; Wah Wah Win Shwe
- Production company: Shwe Nyar Maung Films
- Release date: 1963
- Running time: 110 minutes
- Country: Myanmar
- Language: Burmese

Saung Ta Nya Wal (Burmese: ဆောင်းတညဝယ်) is a 1963 Burmese black-and-white drama film, directed by Bogalay Tint Aung starring Win Oo and Wah Wah Win Shwe.

== Cast ==
- Win Oo
- Wah Wah Win Shwe
