= Khine Mar Lar Hnin Si =

1992 Burmese film

- Film poster
- Burmese: ခိုင်မာလာနှင်းဆီ
- Directed by: Win Oo; Kyi Soe Tun
- Screenplay by: Win Oo
- Produced by: Irene Tin Hla
- Starring: Win Oo; Yan Aung; Khin Than Nu; Myint Myint Khine; Khine Khin Oo; Kyaw Ye Aung
- Production company: Sandar Film
- Release date: November 27, 1992
- Running time: 113 minutes
- Country: Myanmar
- Language: Burmese

Khine Mar Lar Hnin Si (Burmese: ခိုင်မာလာနှင်းဆီ) is a 1992 Burmese drama film, directed by Win Oo and Kyi Soe Tun starring Win Oo, Yan Aung, Khin Than Nu, Myint Myint Khine, Khine Khin Oo and Kyaw Ye Aung. During its filming, director and actor Win Oo died, and was replaced by director Kyi Soe Tun and actor Yan Aung. It premiered on November 27, 1992.

== Cast ==
- Win Oo
- Yan Aung
- Khin Than Nu
- Myint Myint Khine
- Khine Khin Oo
- Kyaw Ye Aung
