= Tein Oo Lay Pyay Maung Ko Say =

1977 Burmese Film

- Film Poster
- Burmese: တိမ်ဦးလေပြေမောင့်ကိုစေ
- Directed by: Win Oo
- Screenplay by: Win Oo
- Story by: Win Oo
- Starring: Win Oo; Khin Yu May; Tin Tin Nwet
- Cinematography: Thein Aung; San Maung
- Music by: Sandayar Hla Htut
- Production company: Sandar Films
- Release date: 1977
- Running time: 110 minutes
- Country: Myanmar
- Language: Burmese

Tein Oo Lay Pyay Maung Ko Say (Burmese: တိမ်ဦးလေပြေမောင့်ကိုစေ) is a 1977 Burmese black-and-white drama film, directed by Win Oo starring Win Oo, Khin Yu May and Tin Tin Nwet.

== Cast ==
- Win Oo as Kyaw Min Win
- Khin Yu May as May Hnin
- Tin Tin Nwet as Mu Yar
- Kyaw Swar Win as Kyaw Swar Win
- Thida Win as Thida Win
- Jolly Swe as Thaw Tar Sein
