= Kyaukme A Kyin Thar =

1969 Burmese film

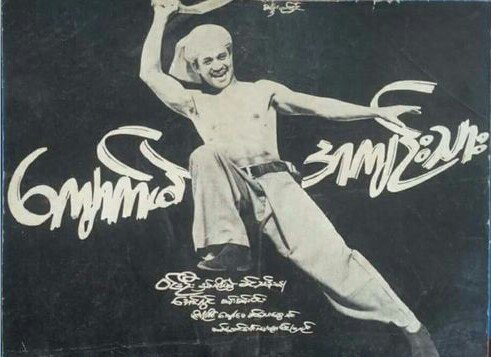
- film poster
- Burmese: ကျောက်မဲအကျဉ်းသား
- Directed by: San Shwe Maung
- Starring: Win Oo; Khin Than Nu; Aung Lwin; Phoe Par Gyi; San San Win
- Cinematography: Thein Aung; One Maung
- Music by: Shwe Pyi Aye
- Production company: Sandar Film
- Release date: 1969
- Running time: 133 minutes
- Country: Myanmar
- Language: Burmese

Kyaukme A Kyin Thar (Burmese: ကျောက်မဲအကျဉ်းသား) is a 1969 Burmese black-and-white action drama film, directed by San Shwe Maung starring Win Oo, Khin Than Nu, Aung Lwin, Phoe Par Gyi and San San Win.

== Cast ==
- Win Oo in dual role as Yan Paing, Ko Ko Maung
- Khin Than Nu as Mya Sandar
- Aung Lwin as Kyaw Zay Ya
- Phoe Par Gyi as U Kan Kywal
- San San Win as Nan Aye
