= Chit Thaw Mg Mg =

1963 Burmese film

Chit Thaw Maung Maung
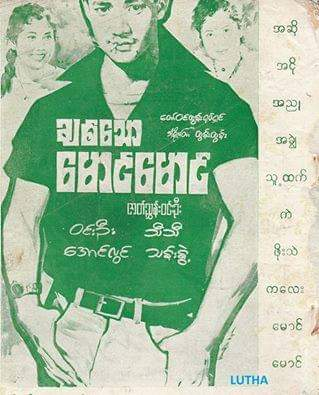
- Film poster
- Burmese: ချစ်သောမောင်မောင်
- Directed by: Htun Htun
- Screenplay by: Win Oo
- Starring: Win Oo; Aung Lwin; Thi Thi; Than Nwet
- Production company: Taw Win Tun Film
- Release date: 1963
- Running time: 113 minutes
- Country: Myanmar
- Language: Burmese

Chit Thaw Maung Maung (Burmese: ချစ်သောမောင်မောင်) is a 1963 Burmese black-and-white drama film, directed by Htun Htun starring Win Oo, Aung Lwin, Thi Thi and Than Nwet.

== Cast ==
- Win Oo
- Aung Lwin
- Thi Thi
- Than Nwet
