= Yee Sar Da Mya =

1967 Burmese Film

- Burmese: ရီးစားဓမြ
- Directed by: Maung Maung Soe; Maung Maung Myint
- Starring: Win Oo; Khin Than Nu
- Production company: Maung Maung Soe Films
- Release date: 1967
- Running time: 110 minutes
- Country: Myanmar
- Language: Burmese

Yee Sar Da Mya (Burmese: ရီးစားဓမြ) is a 1967 Burmese black-and-white drama film, directed by Maung Maung Soe and Maung Maung Myint starring Win Oo and Khin Than Nu.

== Cast ==
- Win Oo as Bo Son Nyo
- Khin Than Nu as Khin Phone Myint
- Kyaw Than
- Win Swe
- Jolly Swe
- Khin Ohn Myint
