= Myanmar Police Band =

Musical band

The Myanmar Police Band (Burmese: ရဲတပ်ဖွဲ့ တီးဝိုင်း) is a military/police band formation in the Myanmar Police Force. Being a battalion-sized organization (it consists of 240 musicians in total), it follows a British and Malaysian military format for marching bands. It is today regarded as Myanmar's oldest brass band, having established in 1945. It is also one of many militarized marching bands in the Myanmar Armed Forces, with the police band being based in Yangon.

== History ==
It was founded in 1945, three years prior to the country gaining its independence from the British Empire. It was at that time, Indians soldiers and Gurkhas from Nepal were recruited to perform during flag-raising ceremonies. The newly formed band consisted of 13 recruits that were trained in Mandalay and sent to towns to train other uniformed musicians. Since 1997, the band has played at military parades and official receptions. The band took its first trip abroad in 2006 to Malaysia to perform with 10 other bands from ASEAN. In 2017, the band hosted the International Police Band Concert in the Kyauktada Township for the first time. It takes part in that event every year, where it performs with police bands from Vietnam and Singapore.

== Conductor ==
One of the musicians trained in Tharyarwaddy was U Ba Tin, who would lead the Rangoon Armed Police Band (RAP) with 35 members, working as its band director for almost three decades. His son is Major U Myo Kyi, who is the current director of the band. He took over in 1997 during the military rule of the State Peace and Development Council. He learned clarinet in 1974 and later learned the saxophone before joining the band in 1977 at the age of 18. He expanded the band's profile by personally providing background music for films and radio. One of the more famous movies he performed in was Sone Yay, which was released in August 1990.

== Organization ==
The band is organized into three companies:

- A Company (42 members)
- B Company (62 members)
- C Company (120 members)

A Company is responsible for performing at national ceremonies such as Armed Forces Day and Independence Day. B and C Companies perform at small scale events such as graduation ceremonies.
