= Tein Hlwar Moht Moht Lwin =

1968 Burmese film

- poster
- Burmese: တိမ်လွှာမို့မို့လွင်
- Directed by: San Shwe Maung
- Starring: Win Oo; Myint Myint Khin; Aung Lwin; Khin Lay Swe; Phoe Par Gyi
- Edited by: Phone Wai Moe
- Music by: Shwe Pyi Aye
- Production company: Nyunt Myanmar Film
- Release date: September 20, 1968
- Running time: 148 minutes
- Country: Myanmar
- Language: Burmese

Tein Hlwar Mhot Mhot Lwin (Burmese: တိမ်လွှာမို့မို့လွင်) is a 1968 Burmese black-and-white drama film, directed by San Shwe Maung, starring Win Oo, Myint Myint Khin, Aung Lwin, Khin Lay Swe and Phoe Par Gyi.

== Cast ==
- Win Oo as Kyaw Soe Moe
- Myint Myint Khin as Kay Thi
- Aung Lwin as Dr. Thant Zin
- Khin Lay Swe as Mya Khin
- Phoe Par Gyi as U Mg Par Gyi
