= Hmone Shwe Yee =

1970 Burmese Film

- Burmese: မှုံရွှေရည်
- Directed by: Win Oo
- Screenplay by: Win Oo
- Produced by: U Ko Ko Gyi
- Starring: Win Oo; Khin Than Nu; Aung Lwin
- Cinematography: Thein Aung
- Edited by: Phone Wai Moe; San Shwe Maung
- Music by: Maung Ko Ko
- Production company: A Paung Let Kha Nar Films
- Distributed by: A Paung Let Kha Nar Films
- Release date: December 10, 1970
- Running time: 150 minutes
- Country: Myanmar
- Language: Burmese

Hmone Shwe Yee (Burmese: မှုံရွှေရည်, lit. 'golden pollen') is a 1970 Burmese black-and-white drama film starring Win Oo, Khin Than Nu and Aung Lwin. The film won the Best Picture Award and Win Oo won the Best Actor Award in 1970 Myanmar Motion Picture Academy Awards.

The film's namesake comes from an eponymous song, which was written by an anonymous composer in the early 20th century. It remains a popular classic performed on radio and performances, including a prominent cover by a classical singer named Tin Tin Mya.

== Cast ==
- Win Oo as Myint Thu
- Sandar Lin as Khin Sandar (his daughter)
- Myat Thu as Myat Thu (his son)
- Khin Than Nu as Khin Hmone (his wife)
- Aung Lwin as Captain Ye Aung
- Phoe Par Gyi as Ko Par Gyi
- Khin Lay Swe as Khin Lay Swe
