= Nge Kywan Swe =

1968 Burmese film

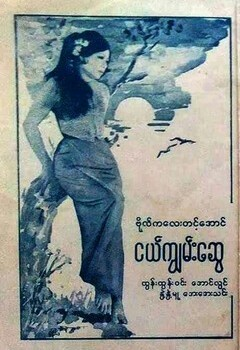
- poster art
- Burmese: ငယ်ကျွမ်းဆွေ
- Directed by: Bogalay Tint Aung
- Screenplay by: Bogalay Tint Aung
- Based on: Nge Kywan Swe (play) by Bogalay Tint Aung
- Starring: Htun Htun Win; Aung Lwin; Nwet Nwet Mu; Aye Aye Thin
- Music by: Bogalay Tint Aung
- Release date: 1968
- Running time: 120 minutes
- Country: Myanmar
- Language: Burmese

Nge Kywan Swe (Burmese: ငယ်ကျွမ်းဆွေ) is a 1968 Burmese black-and-white drama film, directed by Bogalay Tint Aung starring Htun Htun Win, Aung Lwin, Nwet Nwet Mu and Aye Aye Thin.

== Cast ==
- Htun Htun Win
- Aung Lwin
- Nwet Nwet Mu
- Aye Aye Thin
