= Pyo Chit Lin =

1950 Burmese silent color film

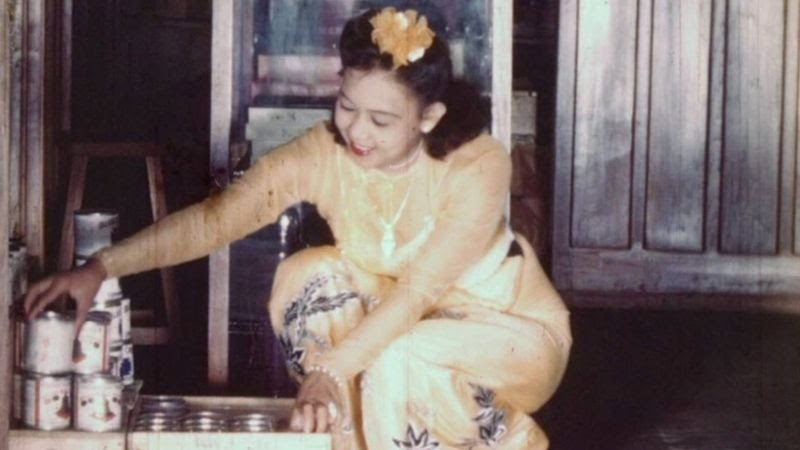
- Image from movie
- Burmese: ပျို့ချစ်လင်
- Directed by: Tin Myint
- Starring: Phoe Par Lay; Phoe Par Gyi; Kyu Kyu
- Edited by: Shwe Taw
- Production company: Yangon Film
- Release date: January 20, 1950
- Running time: 75 minutes
- Country: Myanmar
- Languages: Silent with Burmese inter-titles and English subtitles

Pyo Chit Lin (Burmese: ပျို့ချစ်လင်), also known as My Darling, is one of the very few Myanmar classics still in existence, and is the country’s earliest surviving colour film, directed by Shwe Baw, starring Phoe Par Lay, Phoe Par Gyi and Kyu Kyu.

== Synopsis ==
This romantic comedy revolves around two friends who move to Yangon to look for work. They meet a beautiful young woman named Kyu Kyu, who lives with her aunt since her parents died. Though she is rich and owns her own company, Kyu Kyu is humble and attracts the attention of several suitors, including a police officer, an air force captain, and a writer. Starring many of the major Burmese actors of the time and one of the only surviving films of the era, the film is a valuable document of the prolific and vibrant movie industry in Myanmar then.

== Cast ==
- Po Par Lay
- Phoe Par Gyi
- Kyu Kyu
