= Zin Mar Oo =

Burmese actress (died 2021)

Academy Zin Mar Oo
- Born: 1969 or 1970
- Died: 11 March 2021 (aged 51); Yangon
- Occupation: Actress
- Notable work: Thida Konnatan; Sone Yay
- Awards: Myanmar Motion Picture Academy Awards (1993)

Zin Mar Oo (Burmese: ဇင်မာဦး; 1969/70 – 11 March 2021) was a Burmese actress who won the Myanmar Academy Award in the 1993 film Thida Khonnatan.

== Career ==
In the 1993 film Thida Khonnatan, Zin Mar Oo took on the leading role and won the Myanmar Academy Award for the Best Actress.

She also starred in some well-known films which made her rise in popularity such as Doe (1989), Kyi Soe Tun's Sone Yay (1990), Taikpwe Khawthan (1995) and Ngayetha (2000).

== Personal life and death ==
Her husband, Thiha Tin Soe, is also an actor. The couple have a son and a daughter.

Zin Mar Oo had suffered from lung disease for two years and died of chronic illness on 11 March 2021.

== Awards and nominations ==
Year	Award	Category	Nominated work	Result
1993	Myanmar Motion Picture Academy Awards	Best Actress	Thida Khonnatan	Won
