= Kyun Ma Mhar Main Ma Thar =

1970 Burmese Film

- Burmese: ကျွန်မမှာမိန်းမသား
- Directed by: Thukha
- Starring: Soe Naing; Daisy Kyaw Win; Tin Tin Nwet; Thein Maung
- Music by: Shwe Pyi Aye
- Production company: Thukha Films
- Release date: 1970
- Running time: 134 minutes
- Country: Myanmar
- Language: Burmese

Kyun Ma Mhar Main Ma Thar (Burmese: ကျွန်မမှာမိန်းမသား) is a 1970 Burmese black-and-white drama film, directed by Thukha starring Soe Naing, Daisy Kyaw Win, Tin Tin Nwet and Thein Maung.

== Cast ==
- Soe Naing as Saw Naing
- Daisy Kyaw Win as Kyawt
- Tin Tin Nwet as Myintzu Nwet
- Thein Maung as U Shwe San
- Jolly Swe as Jolly

== Awards ==
Year	Award	Category	Nominee	Result
1970	Myanmar Motion Picture Academy Awards	Best Director	Thukha	Won
1970	Myanmar Motion Picture Academy Awards	Best Actress	Tin Tin Nwet	Won
