= Chit Thaw Thu Ta Yauk =

1962 Burmese film

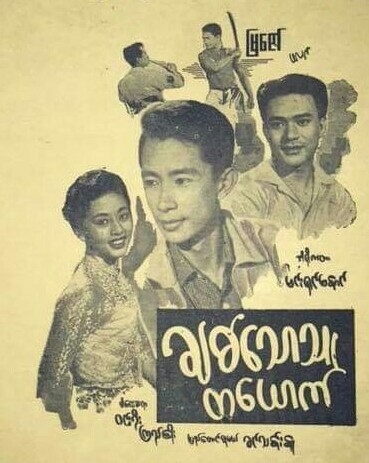
- Film poster
- Burmese: ချစ်သောသူတစ်ယောက်
- Directed by: Min Shin Naung
- Based on: Chit Thaw Thu Ta Yauk by Min Swe
- Starring: Win Oo; Khin Than Nu; Kyi Soe; Than Nwet; Gyan Sein
- Production company: Mya Zaw Film
- Release date: June 1, 1962 (Myanmar)
- Running time: 113 minutes
- Country: Myanmar
- Language: Burmese

Chit Thaw Thu Ta Yauk (Burmese: ချစ်သောသူတစ်ယောက်) is a 1962 Burmese black-and-white drama film, directed by Min Shin Naung starring Win Oo, Khin Than Nu, Kyi Soe, Than Nwet and Gyan Sein. The film was premiered on June 1, 1962.

== Cast ==
- Win Oo
- Khin Than Nu
- Kyi Soe
- Than Nwet
- Gyan Sein
