= Saung Einmet =

1967 Burmese film

Saung Einmet (Death is a Dream)
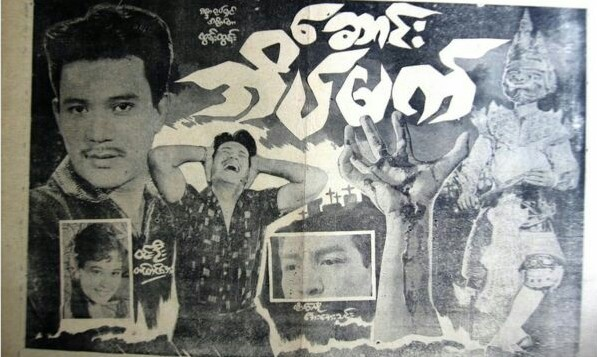
- film poster
- Burmese: ဆောင်းအိပ်မက်
- Directed by: Htun Htun
- Starring: Win Oo; Bo Ba Ko; Aye Aye Thin; Tin Tin Aye; Kyaw Pe; Khin Lay Swe; Myint Htay
- Production company: Sandar Film
- Release date: 1967
- Running time: 142 minutes
- Country: Myanmar
- Language: Burmese

Saung Einmet (Death is a Dream) (Burmese: ဆောင်းအိပ်မက်) is a 1967 Burmese black-and-white psycho thriller drama film, directed by Htun Htun starring Win Oo(In his double lead role), Bo Ba Ko, Aye Aye Thin, Tin Tin Aye, Kyaw Pe, Khin Lay Swe and Myint Htay. Win Oo won the Best Actor Award in 1967 Myanmar Motion Picture Academy Awards for this film.

== Cast ==
- Win Oo as Kyaw Min
- Bo Ba Ko as the Doctor
- Aye Aye Thin as Nu Nu Mar
- Tin Tin Aye as Myint Myint Nwe
- Kyaw Pe as Kyaw Min's father
- Khin Lay Swe as Kyaw Min's mother
- Myint Htay as Young Kyaw Min, Kyaw Min's young life
