= Hna Yauk Htae Nay Chin Tal =

1962 Burmese film

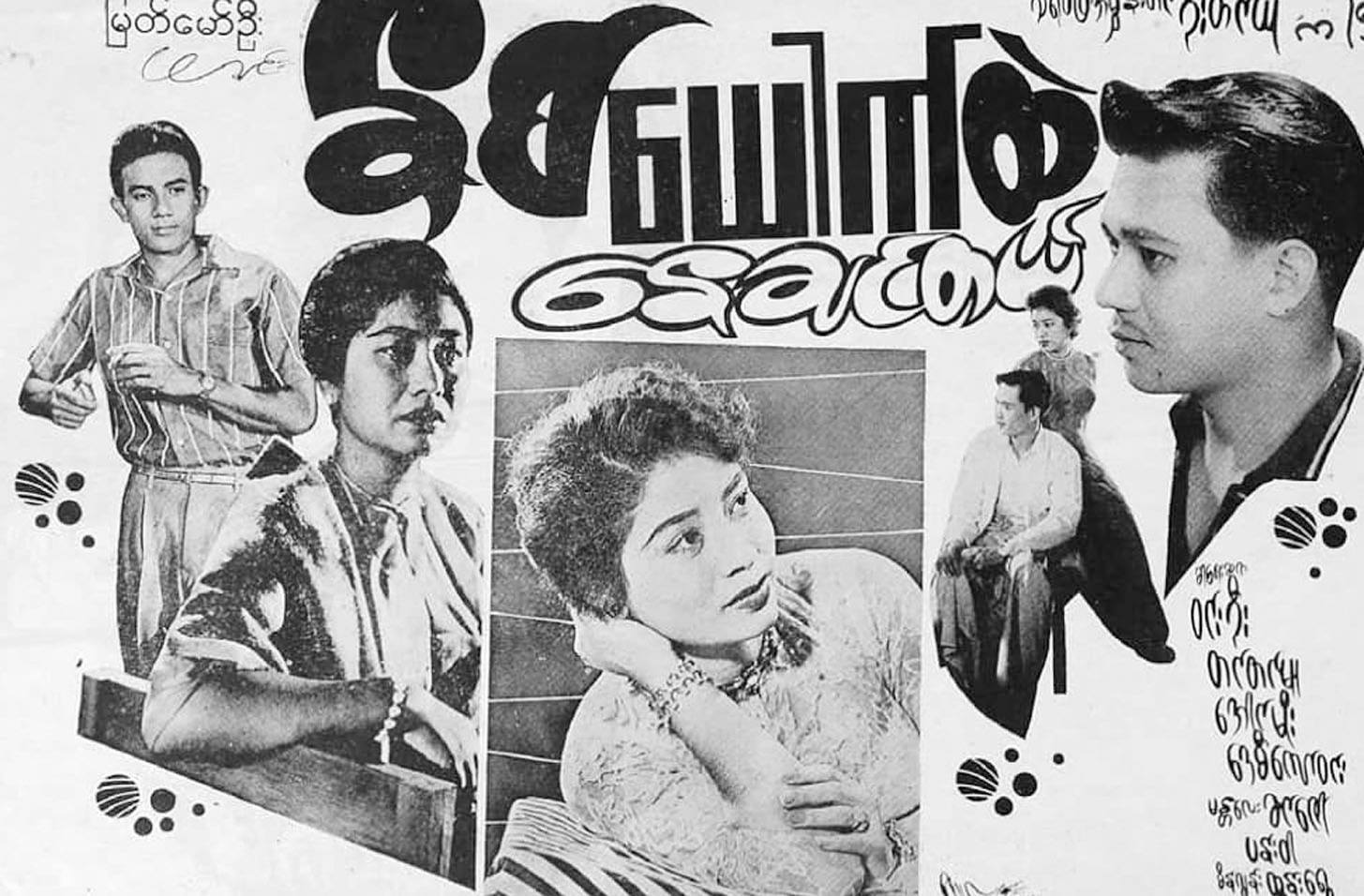
- Film poster
- Burmese: နှစ်ယောက်ထဲနေချင်တယ်
- Directed by: U Tin Yu
- Screenplay by: Win Oo
- Starring: Win Oo; Tin Tin Mu; Aung Moe; Daisy Kyaw Win
- Cinematography: Htun Myint (Mya Zaw)
- Music by: A1 Khin Maung; Maung Soe Myint
- Production company: Myat Maw Oo Film
- Release date: 1962
- Running time: 120 minutes
- Country: Myanmar
- Language: Burmese

Hna Yauk Htae Nay Chin Tal (Burmese: နှစ်ယောက်တည်းနေချင်တယ်) is a 1962 Burmese black-and-white drama film, directed by U Tin Yu starring Win Oo(In his lead role debut), Tin Tin Mu, Aung Moe and Daisy Kyaw Win.

== Cast ==
- Win Oo as Tun Tun
- Tin Tin Mu as Daw Ma Ma Khin
- Aung Moe as Cho
- Daisy Kyaw Win as Nyo Nyo
