= Chit A Mhya (1979 film) =

1979 Burmese film directed by Thukha

- Film poster
- Burmese: ချစ်အမျှ
- Directed by: Thukha
- Screenplay by: Ko Ko
- Produced by: U Than Swe (MDY); U Myo Myint (YGN)
- Starring: Zaw Lin; Khin Yu May; Cho Pyone
- Edited by: Ko Tin Gyi; Soe Moe Naing
- Music by: Maung Ko Ko
- Production company: Thukha Films
- Release date: September 26, 1979
- Running time: 106 minutes
- Country: Myanmar
- Language: Burmese

Chit A Mhya (Burmese: ချစ်အမျှ) is a 1979 Burmese black-and-white drama film, directed by Thukha starring Zaw Lin, Khin Yu May and Cho Pyone. The film is a remake of the 1940 film of the same name.

== Cast ==
- Zaw Lin as Tin Oo
- Khin Yu May as Aye Aye Thwe
- Cho Pyone as Tin Tin Mar
- Eant Kyaw as Ba Than Tin
- Jolly Swe as Shwe Taung

== Award ==
Year	Award	Category	Nominee	Result
1979	Myanmar Motion Picture Academy Awards	Best Actress	Cho Pyone	Won
