= Phoe Pyonn Cho =

- official film poster
- Burmese: ဖိုးပြုံးချို
- Directed by: Mya Maung
- Screenplay by: Tint Tal
- Starring: Phoe Par Gyi; Zeya; Tin Tin Mu; Win Mar; U. Ba Chit
- Production company: Shwe Wal Thiri Film Company
- Release date: December 2, 1955
- Running time: 113 minutes
- Country: Myanmar
- Language: Burmese

Phoe Pyonn Cho (Burmese: ဖိုးပြုံးချို) is a 1955 Burmese black-and-white drama film directed by Mya Maung. The film picked up three Myanmar Motion Picture Academy Awards including Best Film, Best Actor, Best Child Actor.

== Cast ==
- Phoe Par Gyi as Phoe Pyonn Cho
- Zeya as Hla Maung
- Tin Tin Mu as Mu Mu
- Win Mar as A Par, son of Phoe Pyonn Cho
- U. Ba Chit as U Ba Chit

== Awards ==
Year	Award	Category	Nominee	Result
1955	Myanmar Motion Picture Academy Awards	Best Picture	Shwe Wal Thiri Film Company	Won
1955	Myanmar Motion Picture Academy Awards	Best Actor	Phoe Par Gyi	Won
1955	Myanmar Motion Picture Academy Awards	Special Award (Child Actor)	Win Mar	Won
