= Shwe Man Tin Maung =

Burmese dancer

Alinga Kyaw Swa Shwe Man Tin Maung
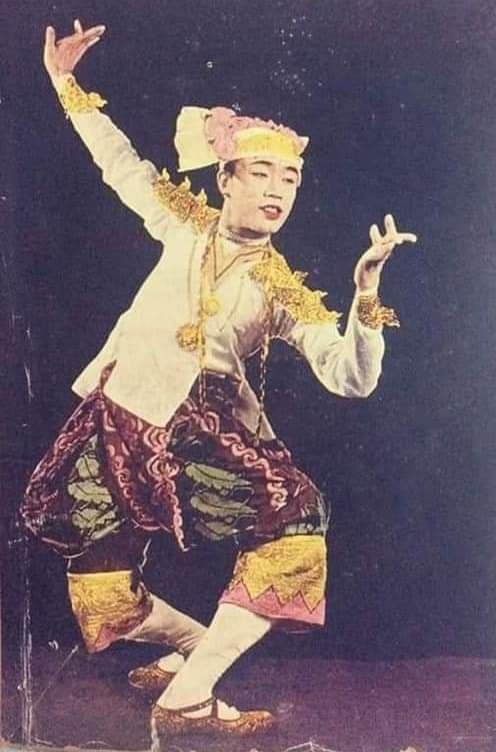
- Born: Tin Maung; 21 December 1918; Mandalay, Burma
- Died: 29 November 1969 (aged 50); Minhla, Magway
- Organization: Shwe Man Thabin (ရွှေမန်းသဘင်)
- Known for: Burmese dance
- Spouse: Daw Thein Nyunt
- Children: Nyunt Win; Win Bo; San Win; Khin Chit Win; Khin Win Kyi; Win Maung; Chan Thar
- Parent(s): U Pya (father); Daw May (mother)
- Awards: Alinkar Kyawswa (1953)

Shwe Man Tin Maung (Burmese: ရွှေမန်းတင်မောင်, 21 December 1918 – 29 November 1969) was an influential Burmese dancer and founder of the Shwe Man Thabin family dance troupe, the last of its kind in Burma. He was considered one of the three most skilled zat pwe performers of his day, along with Kenneth Sein and Sein Aung Min, and led the Burmese Zat Thabin industry, following the example of Po Sein.

A bronze statue of Tin Maung stands before the National Theatre of Mandalay. His oratorical skills gave rise to the Burmese saying "Talking like Shwe Man."

== Early life ==
Tin Maung, the youngest of nine siblings, was born in Mandalay in 1918 to U Pya and Daw May. His father died when he was eight years old. He became interested in singing and dancing and started performing as a Zeetheekauk Minthale at his uncle's marionette show.

== Career ==
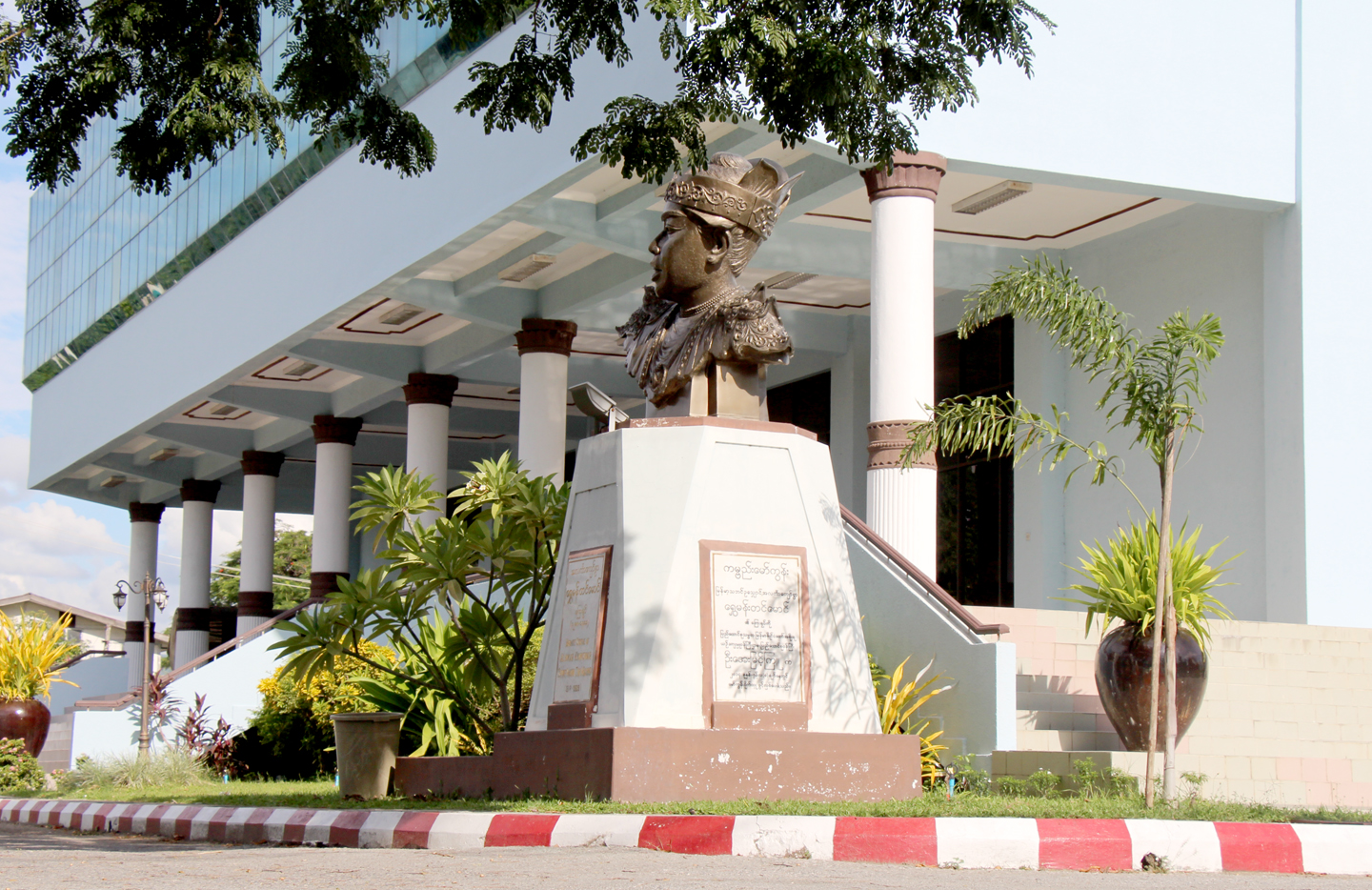
Bronze figure of Shwe Man Tin Maung at the National Theatre of Mandalay

After studying traditional drama under Mya Chay Gyin Ma Ngwe Myaing for three years, he founded the Shwe Man Thabin dance troupe in 1933. Four generations of his family would eventually become members.

He was the first to use a searchlight on stage, breaking away from older lighting traditions, and introduced half-night dances, which included a dance duet and an opera, instead of the usual all-night performances. He was awarded the title of Alinkar Kyawswa by the Burmese government in 1953. In 1959, he was invited to the United States as a representative of the Myanmar dance troupe tradition.

He performed well-known songs, such as "Aungbaze" and "Shwekyayzi", and in operas, including Ywekonthe, Htwatyatlan, Maung Mhue and Gitayoo. The Buddhist Jataka operas he performed are still remembered in rural traditional festival circles.

== Death ==
On the night of 29 November 1969, Tin Maung died of hypertension while dancing on stage during the Mahapeinne pagoda festival near Minhla, Magway.

== Family ==
He and his wife Daw Thein Nyunt had seven children: Nyunt Win, Win Bo, San Win, Khin Chit Win, Khin Win Kyi, Win Maung and Chan Thar. Nyunt Win became a performer and earned seven Myanmar Motion Picture Academy Awards. His other four sons are dancers, and his grandchildren Tin Maung San Min Win and Kyaw Kyaw Bo are also artists.

== See also ==
- Burmese dance
