= Beyond the Horizon (film) =

- Film poster
- Burmese: မိုးကုတ်စက်ဝိုင်းကိုကျော်လွန်၍
- Directed by: San Shwe Maung
- Cinematography: Naing Nu Shain
- Release date: 2005
- Running time: 145 minutes
- Country: Myanmar
- Language: Burmese

Beyond the Horizon (Burmese: မိုးကုတ်စက်ဝိုင်းကိုကျော်လွန်၍) is a 2005 Burmese drama film directed by San Shwe Maung. In this film, Htun Eaindra Bo won her third Myanmar Academy Award for Best Actress and Naing Nu Shain (aka) Pha Hti got Academy Award for Best Cinematography.

== Plot ==
The film tells the story of a man whose dreams are premonitions of the future.

The protagonist is psychologically disturbed by recurring nightmares. Something is adrift in a river inlet, drawing ever closer to him. To seek solace, he approaches a psychiatrist and for a short while is freed from nightmares until he meets a woman and falls in love.

== Cast ==
- Lwin Moe
- Yan Kyaw
- Htun Eaindra Bo
- Khine Thin Kyi
- Myat Kay Thi Aung

== International showing ==
In 2005, this film was released in Myanmar. On August 7–13, 2006, this film was screened at the ASEAN Film Festival in Singapore.
