= Sone Yay =

- Directed by: Kyi Soe Tun
- Screenplay by: Mit Mit (Pyay)
- Starring: Kyaw Hein; Khin Than Nu; Zin Mar Oo; Min Oo
- Cinematography: Kyi Soe Tun
- Release date: August 10, 1990
- Running time: 120 minutes
- Country: Myanmar
- Language: Burmese

Sone Yay (Burmese: စုန်ရေ; lit: Downstream) is a 1990 Burmese drama film starring Kyaw Hein, Khin Than Nu, Zin Mar Oo and Min Oo. The film was directed by Kyi Soe Tun.

== Plot ==
Aung Wai is working in the Construction Department in Yangon. His wife dies and Aung Wai is left with their son and daughter. Aung Wai wife's sister takes care of the children. When the children are old enough to attend the school, he is moved to Pyay.

== Cast ==
- Kyaw Hein as Aung Wai
- Zin Mar Oo as Chit Thel Wai (his daughter)
- Min Oo as Khin Maung Wai (his son)
- Khin Than Nu as Khin Htway Yi
