= National Theatre of Mandalay =

- အမျိုးသား ဇာတ်ရုံ (မန္တလေး)
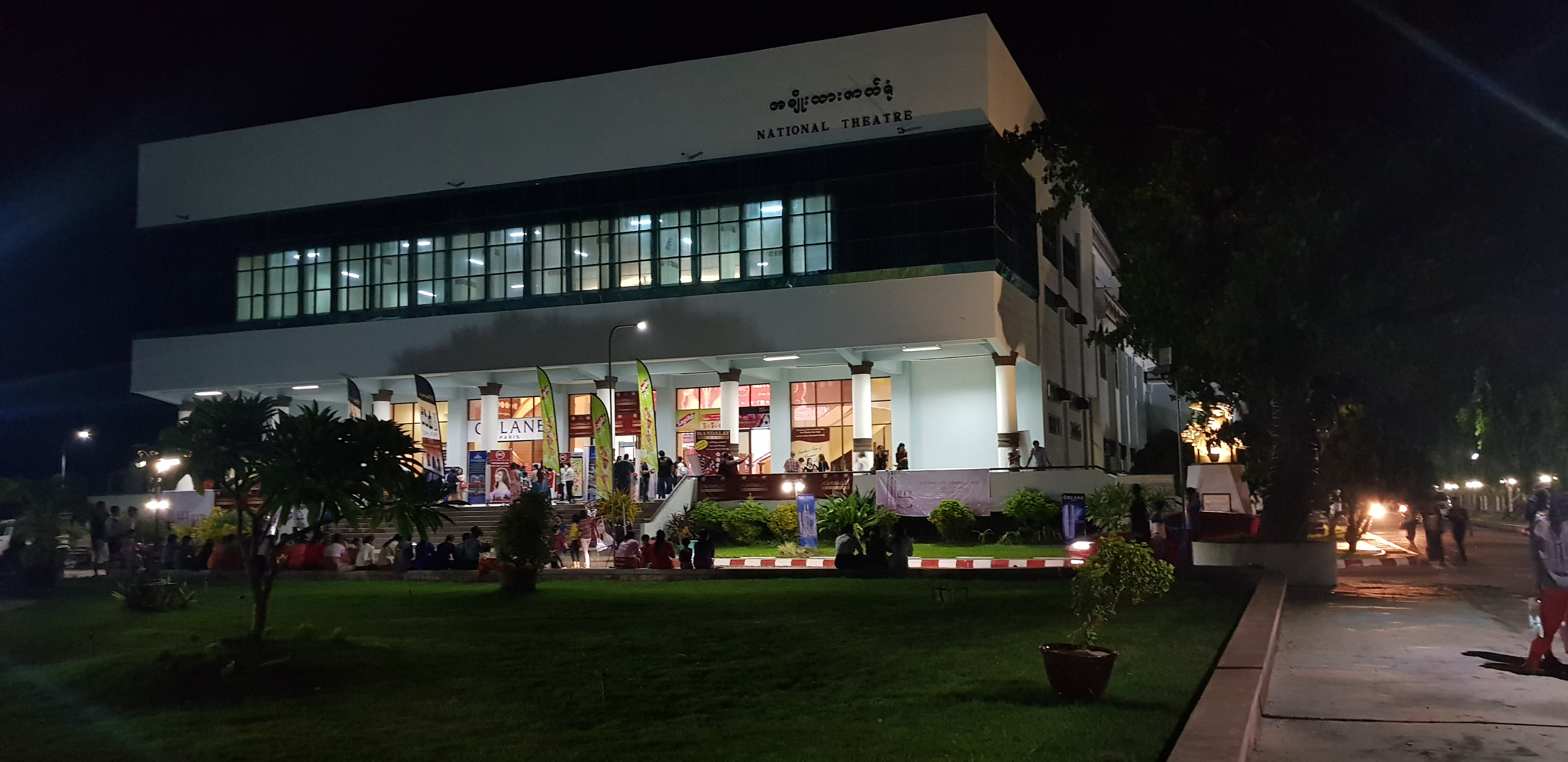
- National Theatre of Mandalay
- Interactive map of National Theatre of Mandalay
- Location: 66th Road, bet. 21st and 22nd Streets; Aungmyethazan, Mandalay
- Coordinates: 21.989826°N 96.107742°E
- Owner: Ministry of Religious Affairs and Culture

Construction
- Built: 1 January 1993
- Opened: 16 October 1999

The National Theatre of Mandalay (Burmese: အမျိုးသား ဇာတ်ရုံ (မန္တလေး)), located in Aungmyethazan Township, Mandalay, is a national theatre of Myanmar. The theatre is used for cultural exchange programs with foreign countries, departmental workshops, religious ceremonies, award ceremonies, performing arts competitions, and musical concerts.

== Gallery ==
Bronze busts of famous Mandalay artists lined up in front the theatre

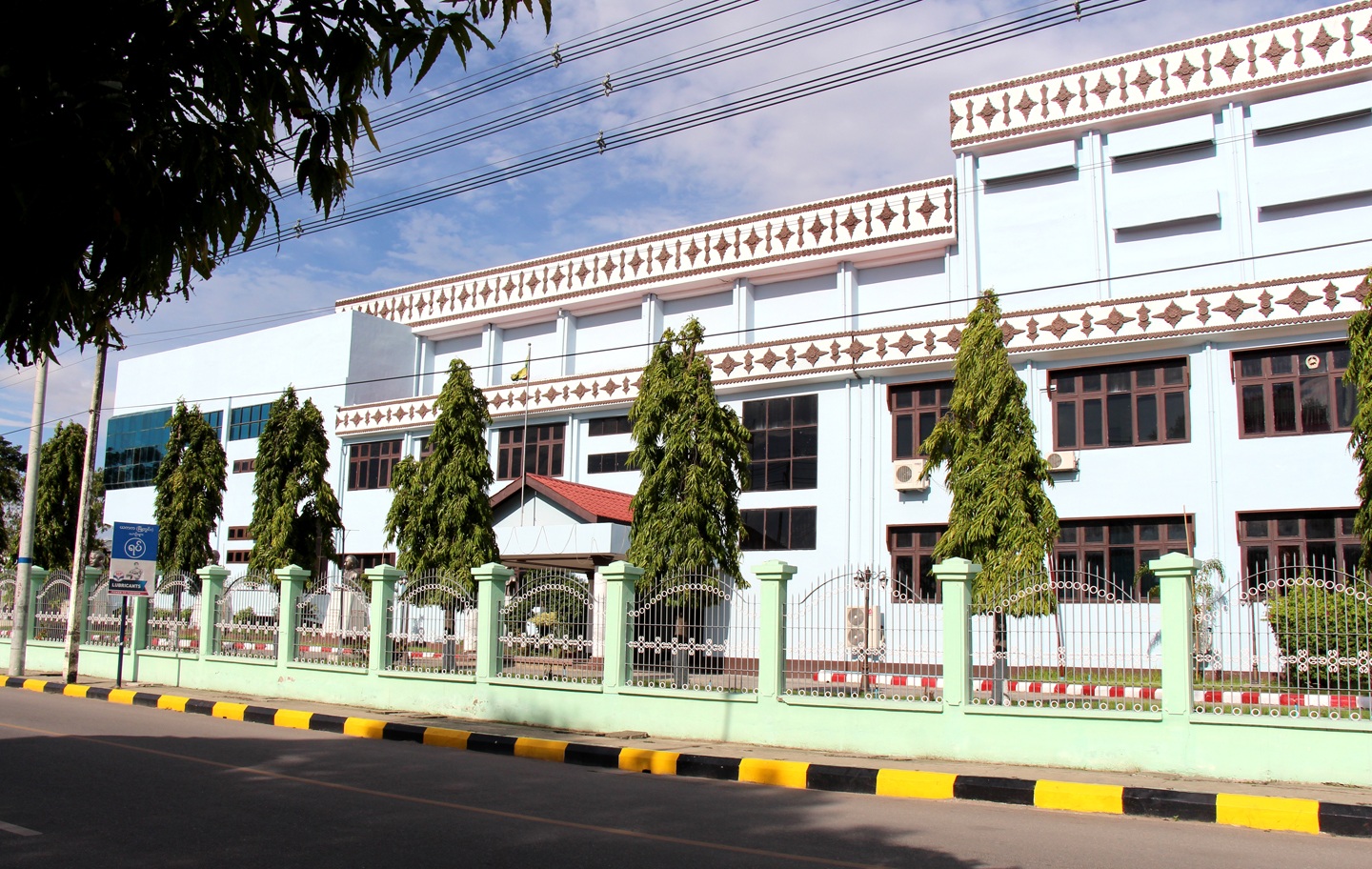
View from outside

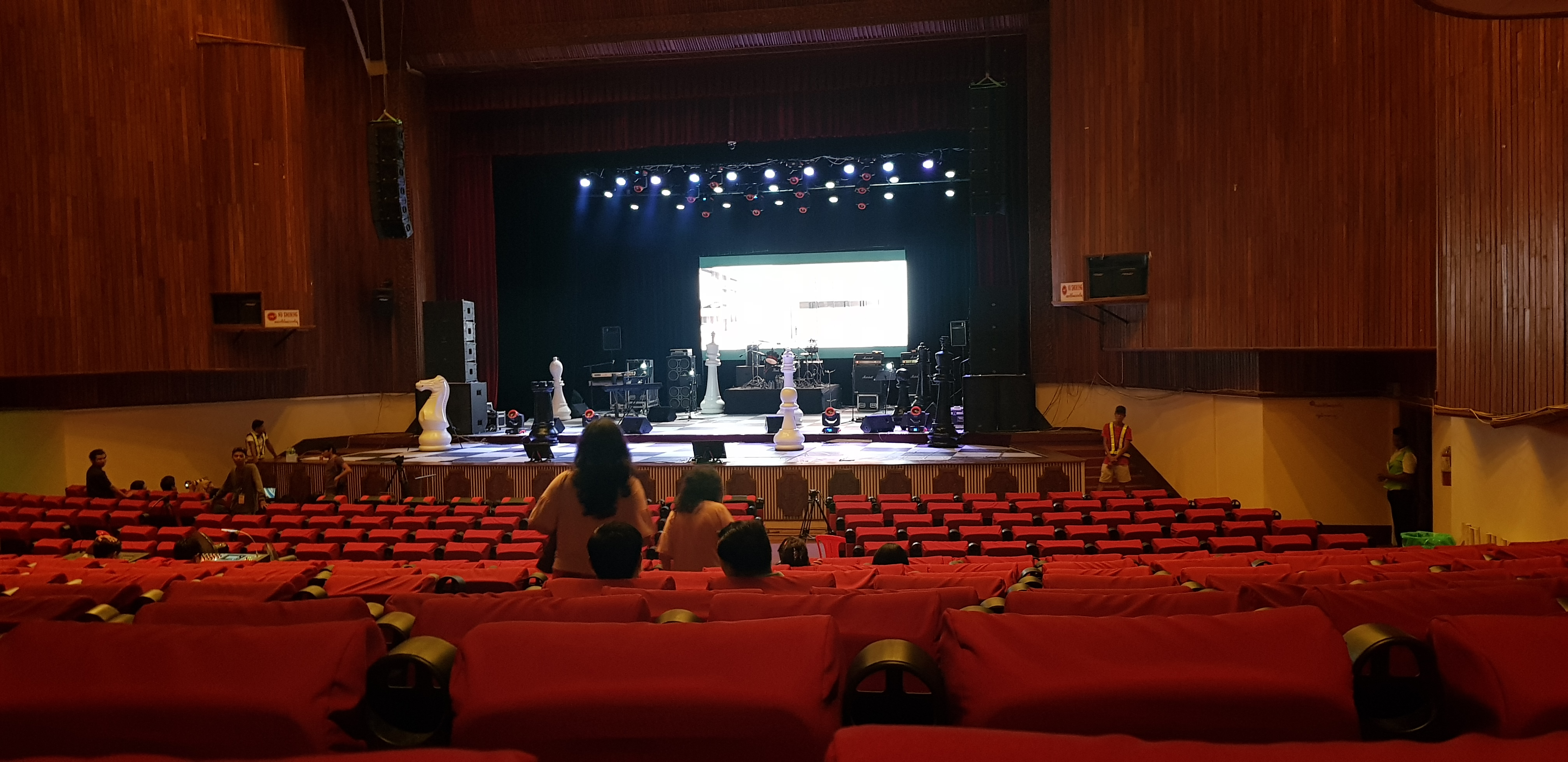
Inside the theatre

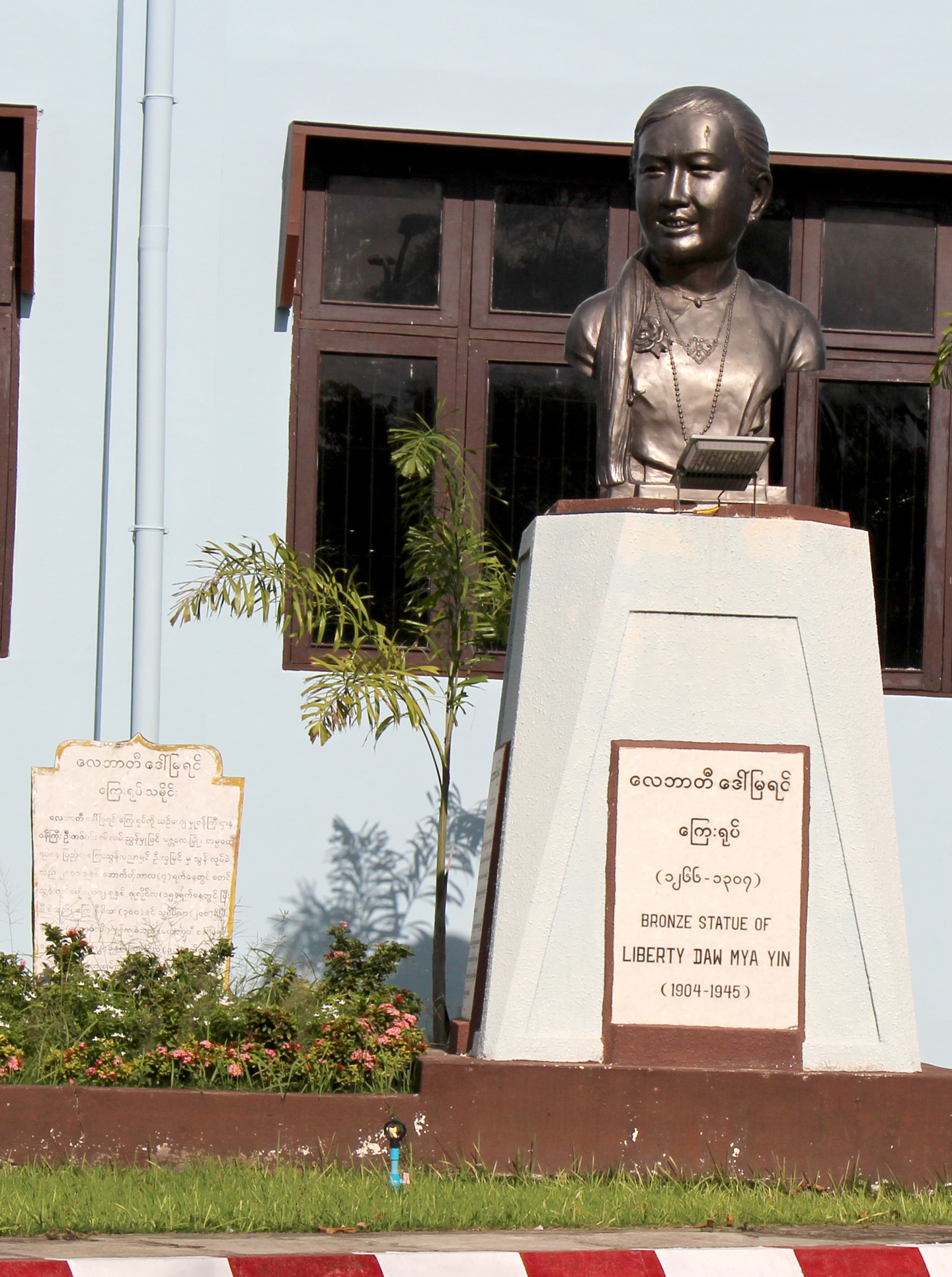
Liberty Ma Mya Yin

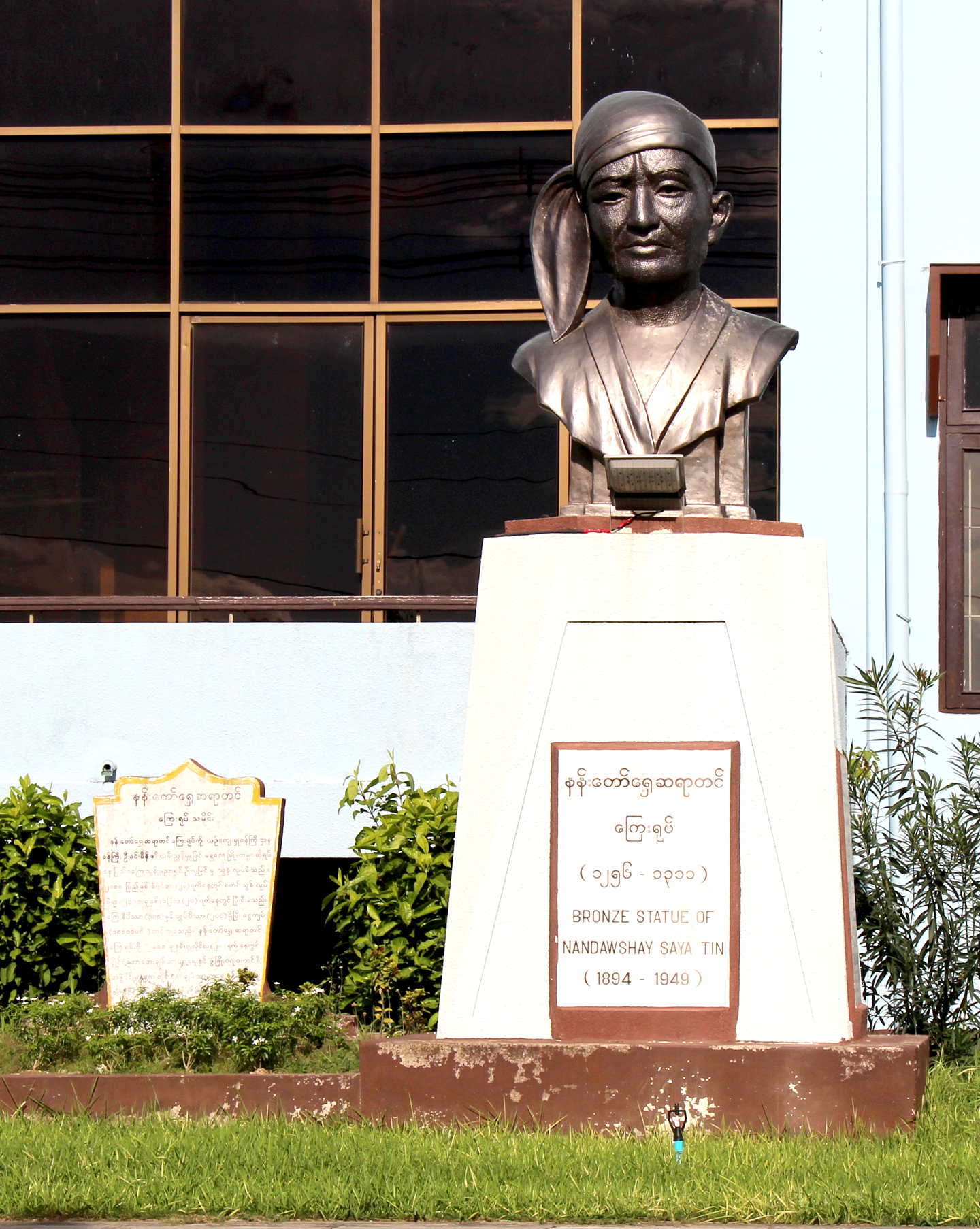
Nandawshay Saya Tin

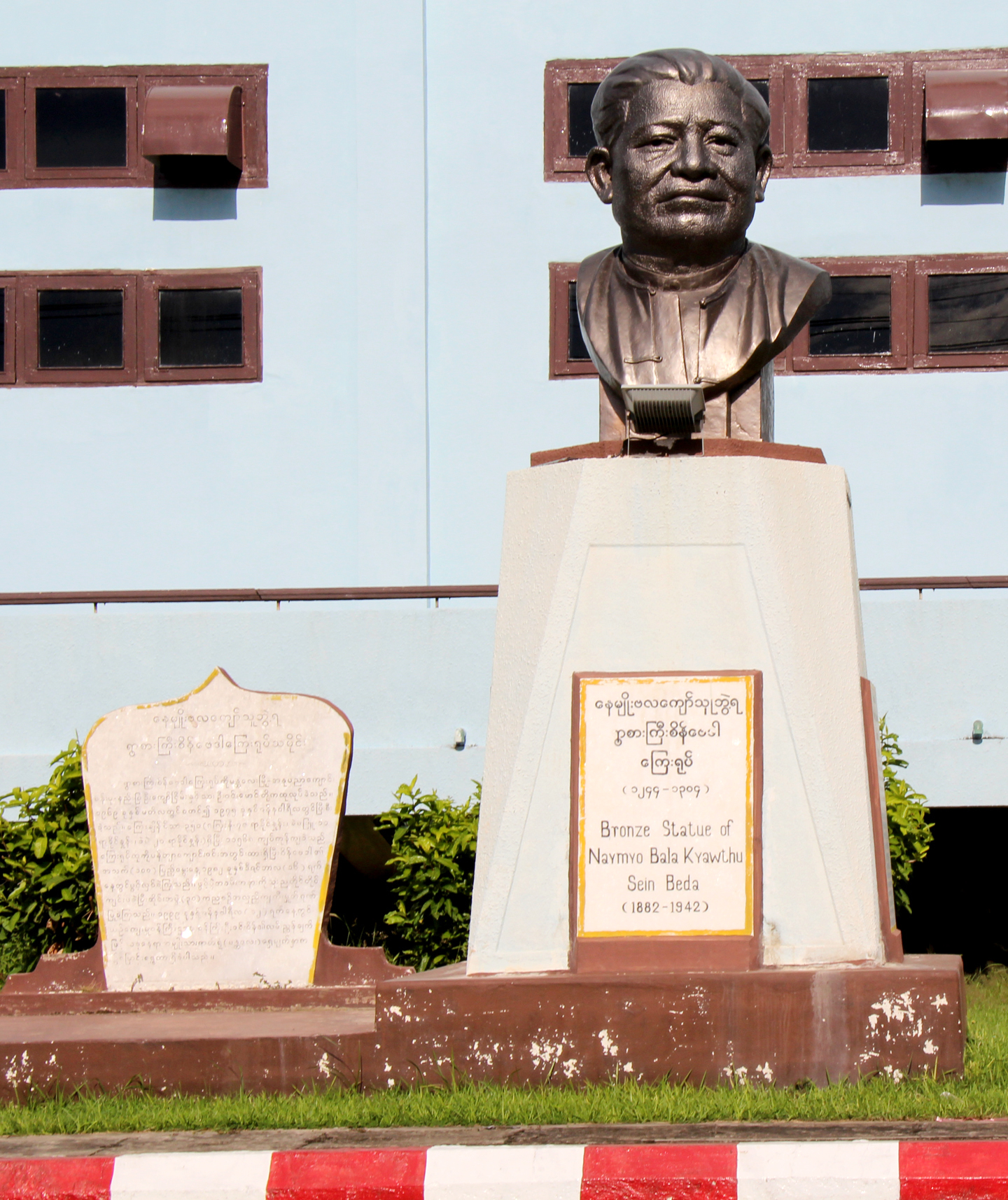
Sein Beda

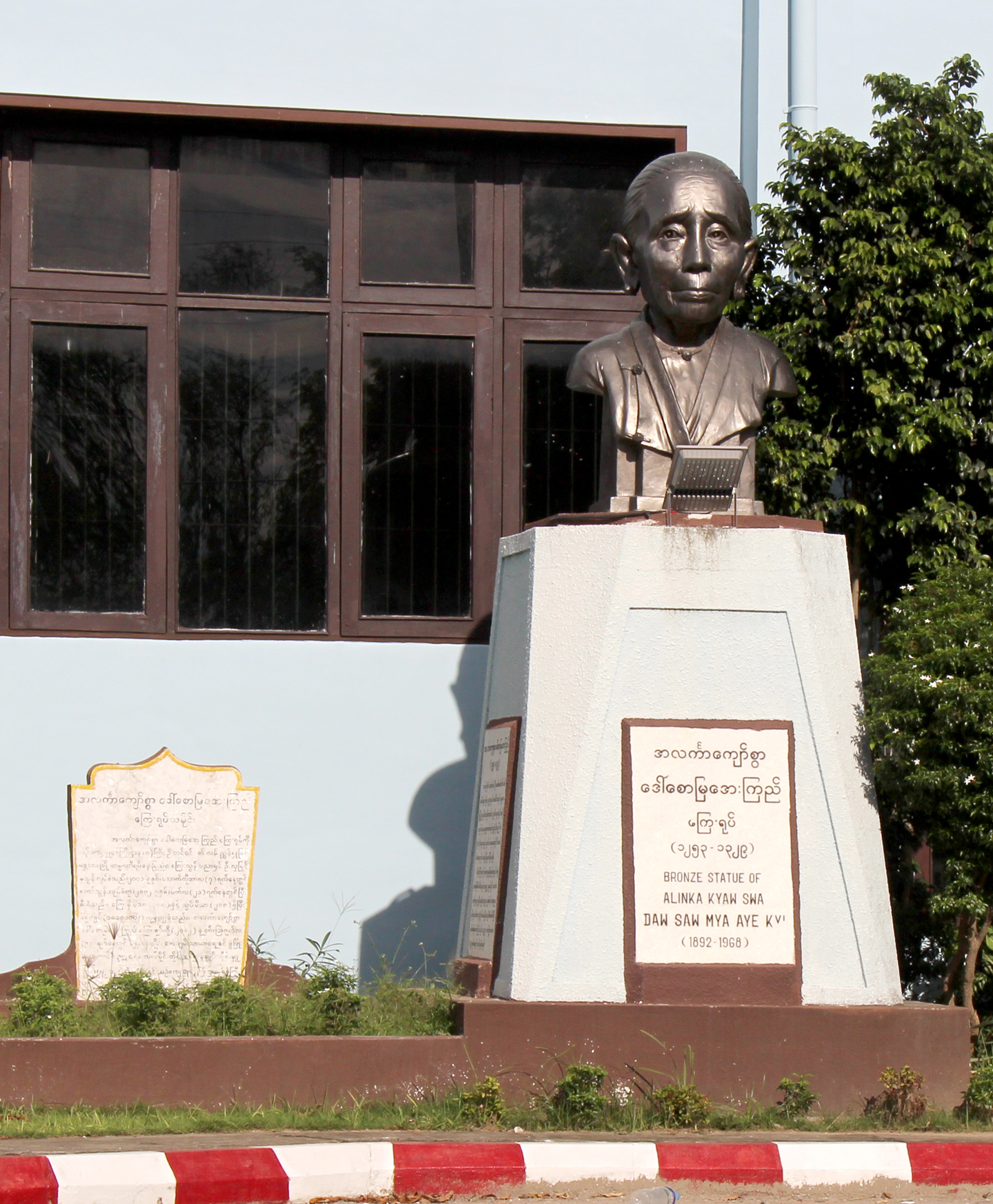
Bronze bust of Saw Mya Aye Kyi outside the national theatre

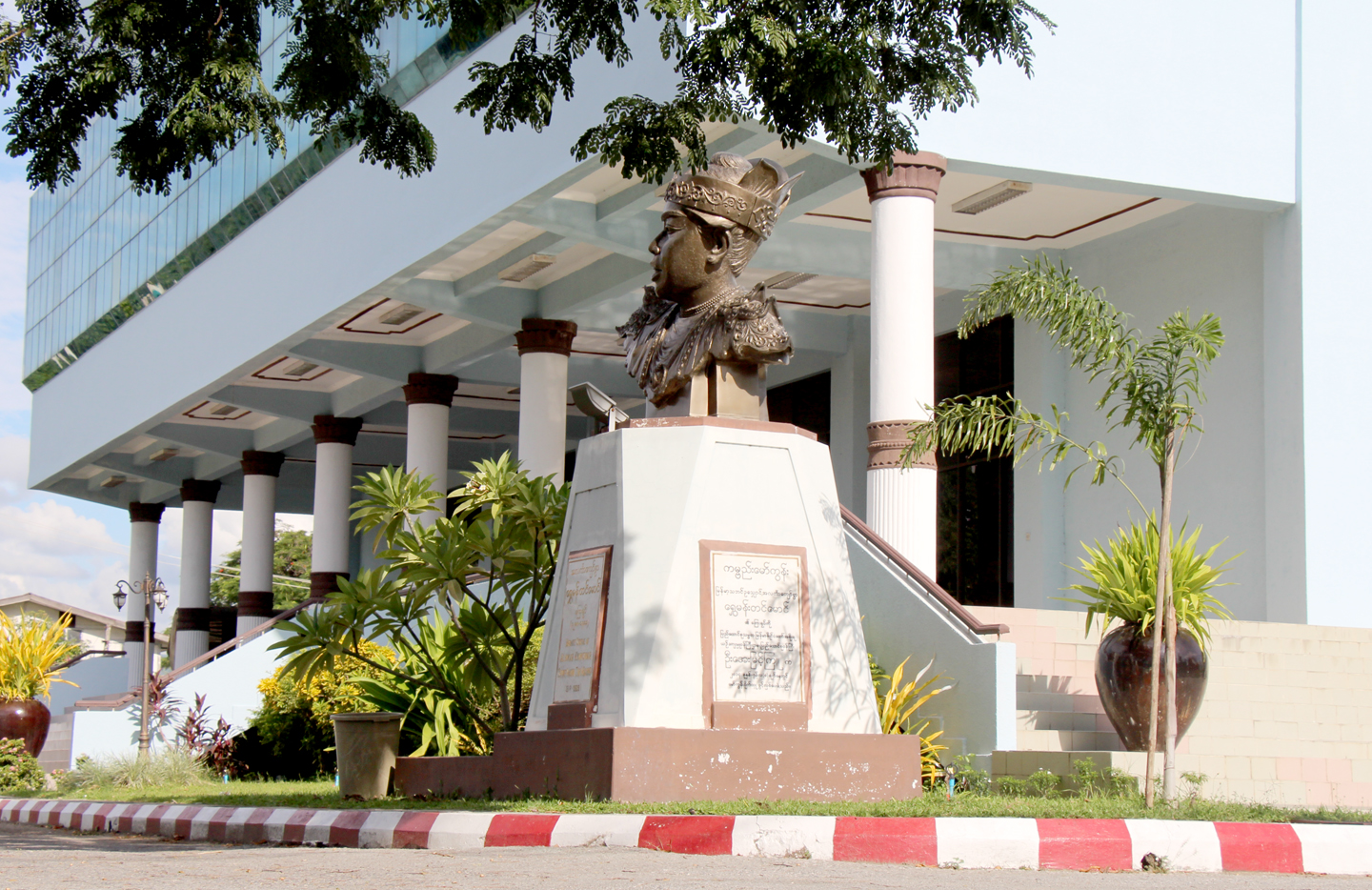
Shwe Man Tin Maung
