= A Twal A Tar =

1972 Burmese film

- film poster
- Burmese: အတွယ်အတာ
- Directed by: Win Oo
- Screenplay by: Win Oo
- Starring: Win Oo; Sandar Lin
- Cinematography: Thein Aung; One Maung
- Edited by: Khaing Myint Win; Swe Sett
- Music by: Maung Ko Ko
- Production company: Sandar Film
- Release date: 1972
- Running time: 152 minutes
- Country: Myanmar
- Language: Burmese

A Twal A Tar (Burmese: အတွယ်အတာ) is a 1972 Burmese black-and-white drama film, directed by Win Oo starring Win Oo and Sandar Lin.

== Cast ==
- Win Oo as Win Zaw
- Sandar Lin as Mi Chaw
