= Sein Stine =

Burmese musician (1949–2019)

Alinkar Kyawswa Sein Stine
- Born: Tin Aung; 9 January 1949; Danubyu, Burma
- Died: 3 November 2019 (aged 70); Yangon, Myanmar
- Occupation: musician
- Parent(s): Mahn Delone, Naw Aye Chan
- Awards: Alinkar Kyawswa (2020)

Sein Stine (Burmese: စိန်စတင်း, born Tin Aung, 9 January 1949 – 3 November 2019) was a Burmese Hsaing waing musician of the late twentieth and the early twenty-first century. He was one of the three hsaing musicians who have been awarded the title of Alinkar Kyawswa.

== Life ==
Sein Stine was born to Mahn Delone and Naw Aye Chan at Danubyu Township, Ayeyarwady Region in 1949.

He started performing hsaing at the commemoration ceremony of YMB Saya Tin at the age 16. Thereafter, he became popular until his death in 2019.

== Musical career ==
He was posthumously awarded the title of Alinkar Kyawswa by the government of Myanmar on 4 January 2020, honoring his contributions to the field of hsaing industry. On 4 January 2021, Sein Stine's son Sein Min Naing accepted the title on his behalf, at the ceremony conferring honorary titles by the President Win Myint.
