= Kenneth Sein =

Burmese dancer and singer

Wunna Kyawhtin Kenneth Sein
- Born: Khet Sein; 19 September 1916; Rangoon, Burma
- Died: 28 November 1973 (aged 57); Rangoon, Burma
- Other name: Kanak Sein (ကနက်စိန်)
- Organization: Sein Maha Thabin (စိန်မဟာသဘင်)
- Known for: Burmese dance
- Spouse: Daw Ngwe Kaing
- Children: Ye Sein; Nyi Win Sein a daughter
- Parent(s): Po Sein and Daw Kyin Yone
- Awards: Wunna Kyawhtin

Kenneth Sein (Burmese: ကက်နက်စိန်, 1916–1973) was a Burmese dancer of the twentieth century under the label of Sein Maha Thabin dance troupe. He was considered one of the three most skilled zat pwe performers of his days, along with Shwe Man Tin Maung and Sein Aung Min. His dancing skill gave rise to the Burmese saying "Dancing like Kenneth Sein."

== Early life ==
Khet Sein, eldest of seven siblings, was born on 19 September 1916 to the Great Po Sein and Daw Kyin Yone at Rangoon.

When he went to Saint John's school, his name became Kenneth Sein.

== Career ==
Later, he joined his father Po Sein's dance group, Sein Maha Thabin. His stage name Kanak Sein was inspired by the Kanakkadan of the Burmese royals. But he was also known as Kenneth Sein since the Burmese pronunciation for both Kanak and Kenneth are mostly the same.

He was invited to the United States, Japan, China, and India to perform Burmese dance in the 1950s.

In 1959, he and his brother Tathet Sein performed an opera "The Exile" which was very popular at its time.

For his contributions to the field of zat pwe, he became to receive the title of Wunna Kyawhtin from the Burmese government.

Kenneth Sein died of cardiovascular disease on 28 November 1973, 4:40 pm at Rangoon.

== Family ==
He and his wife Daw Ngwe Kaing had two sons–Ye Sein and Nyi Win Sein– and a daughter. Like father like son, his two sons were also the famous dancers.

== Publication ==
Kenneth Sein published a book named "The Great Po Sein: A Chronicle of the Burmese Theater" with the help of J. A. Withey in 1965.
