= Nauk Ma Kya Kyay =

- Starring: Dwe; Khine Thin Kyi; Eaindra Kyaw Zin; Aung Lwin; Nhat Pyaw Kyaw; Pho Phyu; A Yine; King Kong; Ku Tho; Aye Yar; Nyi Nanda; Min Kha; Nyo Min Lwin; Zin Myo; Phoe Kyaw; Shon Lai Oo; University Gone Pone; Ein Phyu; Phu Sone
- Cinematography: Nyein Min
- Distributed by: Lucky Seven film production and distribution company
- Release date: December 3, 2004
- Country: Myanmar
- Language: Burmese

Nauk Ma Kya Kyay (Burmese: နောက်မကျကြေး) or Don't Late is a 2004 Burmese musical dramatic film, directed by Mg Myo Min (Yin Twin Phit). In this film, starred Myanmar movie stars, Dwe, Khine Thin Kyi, Eaindra Kyaw Zin, Aung Lwin, Nhat Pyaw Kyaw, Pho Phyu, A Yine, King Kong, Ku Tho, Aye Yar, Nyi Nanda, Min Kha, Nyo Min Lwin, Zin Myo, Phoe Kyaw, Shon Lai Oo, University Gon Pon, Ein Phyu, Phu Sone. The film was produced by Lucky Seven film production and distribution company.

== Synopsis ==
A university student, Saw Oo, struggles with his former girlfriend, Khin Naun, and his new partner, Nat Ta Mi. Khin Naun once loved Saw Oo, but marries another man due to Oo's unenthusiastic nature. This film follows his life as he tries to find love and harmony.

== Cast ==
- Dwe as Saw Oo
- Khine Thin Kyi as Khin Naun
- Eaindra Kyaw Zin as Nat Ta Mi
- Aung Lwin
- Goon Pone
- Nhat Pyaw Kyaw
- Pho Phyu
- A Yine
- King Kong
- Ku Tho
- Aye Yar
- Nyi Nanda
- Min Kha
- Nyo Min Lwin
- Zin Myo
- Phoe Kyaw
- Shon Lai Oo
- Ein Phyu
- Phu Sone

== Release ==
Naug Ma Kja Kyay was released on December 3, 2004, at Twin, Tamata, Mingalar in Yangon, Win Lite, Myo Ma in Mandalay, Nyunt, Shwe Hin Tha, Ye Tan Kon in Bago, Bandola in Taunggyi and Gong in Baik, Tanintharyi Division.
