= Maung Mu Paing Shin (1964 film) =

1964 Burmese film

- poster
- Burmese: မောင့်မူပိုင်ရှင်
- Directed by: Aung Win
- Starring: Htun Wai; Collegian Ne Win; Daisy Kyaw Win; Khin Than Nu
- Music by: Sandayar Hla Htut
- Production company: Mandalay Film
- Release date: 1964
- Running time: 138 minutes
- Country: Myanmar
- Language: Burmese

Maung Mu Paing Shin (Burmese: မောင့်မူပိုင်ရှင်) is a 1964 Burmese black-and-white drama film, directed by Aung Win starring Htun Wai, Collegian Ne Win, Daisy Kyaw Win and Khin Than Nu. A remake of the film was released in 2000.

== Cast ==
- Htun Wai as Soe Min
- Collegian Ne Win as Myint Naung
- Daisy Kyaw Win as Thin Thin Naing
- Khin Than Nu as Nu Nu Swe
- Than Nwet as Than Nwet
