= Padauk Yake Wal =

1963 Burmese Film

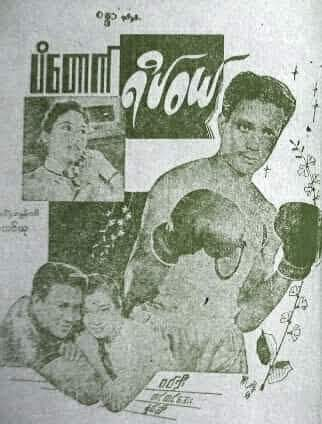
- Film Poster
- Burmese: ပိတောက်ရိပ်ဝယ်
- Directed by: U Tin Yu
- Starring: Win Oo; Tin Tin Aye; Hnin Si
- Production company: Sandar Films
- Release date: 1963
- Running time: 110 minutes
- Country: Myanmar
- Language: Burmese

Padauk Yake Wal (Burmese: ပိတောက်ရိပ်ဝယ်) is a 1963 Burmese black-and-white drama film, directed by U Tin Yu starring Win Oo, Tin Tin Aye and Hnin Si.

== Cast ==
- Win Oo
- Tin Tin Aye
- Hnin Si
