= Ta Kyawt Hna Kyawt Tay Ko Thi =

1971 Burmese film

- Burmese: တကျော့နှစ်ကျော့တေးကိုသီ
- Directed by: Htun Nyunt Oo
- Screenplay by: Nanda Thu
- Story by: Nanda Thu
- Starring: Win Oo; Tin Tin Mya; Cho Pyone
- Cinematography: Thein Aung; One Maung
- Edited by: Phone Myint; Maung Maung; Myint Wai; Tin Myint
- Music by: A1 Khin Maung; A1 Soe Myint
- Production company: Sandar Film
- Release date: September 17, 1971
- Running time: 148 minutes
- Country: Myanmar
- Language: Burmese

Ta Kyawt Hna Kyawt Tay Ko Thi (Burmese: တကျော့နှစ်ကျော့တေးကိုသီ) is a 1971 Burmese black-and-white drama film, directed by Htun Nyunt Oo, starring Win Oo, Tin Tin Mya (who also sang a song for the flm) and Cho Pyone.

== Cast ==
- Win Oo as Kyaw Swar
- Tin Tin Mya as Wai Wai Soe
- Cho Pyone as Thin Thin Htwe
- Khin Lay Swe as Ma Aye Kyi
