= Zagar Pyaw Thaw Athel Hnalone =

- film poster
- Burmese: စကားပြောသောအသည်းနှလုံး
- Directed by: Thukha
- Screenplay by: Thukha
- Starring: Soe Naing; Tin Tin Nwet; Kyi Kyi Htay; Myo Nyein; Thein Maung; Kyauk Lone; Thida Khin Htwe; Ba Chit
- Distributed by: Thukha Film
- Release date: 1968
- Country: Myanmar
- Language: Burmese

Zagar Pyaw Thaw Athel Hnalone (Burmese: စကားပြောသောအသည်းနှလုံး, English: Talking Heart) is a 1968 Burmese black-and-white drama film directed by Thukha. The film won three Myanmar Academy Awards including Best Film, Best Director and Best Supporting Actor.

== Cast ==
- Soe Naing as Myo Khine
- Tin Tin Nwe as Tin Tin Maw
- Kyi Kyi Htay as Mi Mi Khine, Thel Au
- Myo Nyein as U Kyaw Khine
- Thein Maung as U Thein Zan
- Kyuk Lone as Ba Kunt
- Thida Khin Htwe as Daw Ma Ma
- Ba Chit as Ba Chit
- Thukha as U Thukha

== Awards ==
Year	Award	Category	Nominee	Result
1968	Myanmar Motion Picture Academy Awards	Best Picture	Thukha Film	Won
1968	Myanmar Motion Picture Academy Awards	Best Director	Thukha	Won
1968	Myanmar Motion Picture Academy Awards	Best Supporting Actor	Thein Maung	Won
