= Hnin Pyauk Tae Nway =

1967 Burmese film

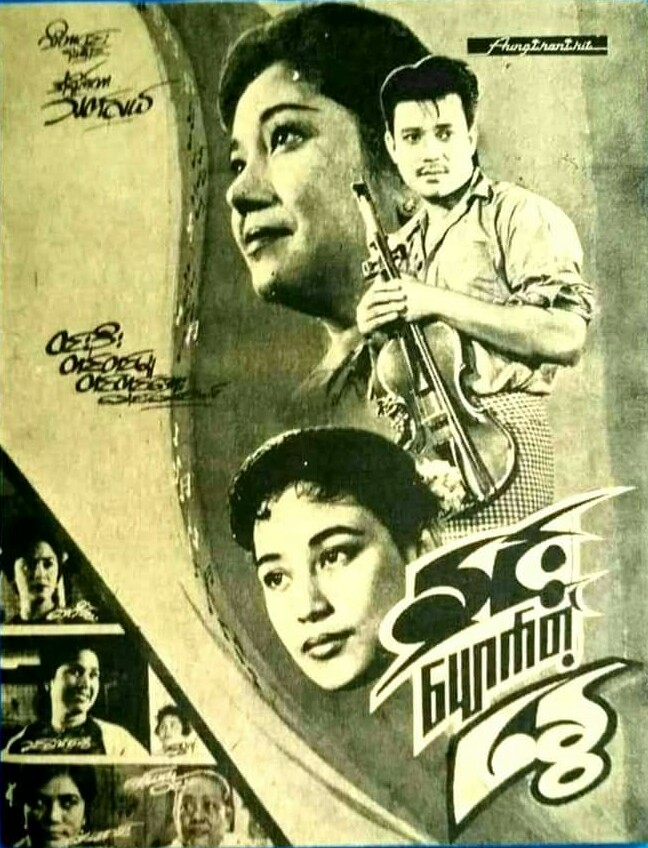
- Film poster
- Burmese: နှင်းပျောက်တဲ့နွေ
- Directed by: Thet Lal
- Starring: Win Oo; Tin Tin Mu; Tin Tin Aye
- Production company: Thida Win Film
- Release date: February 1967 (Myanmar)
- Running time: 113 minutes
- Country: Myanmar
- Language: Burmese

Hnin Pyauk Tae Nway (Burmese: နှင်းပျောက်တဲ့နွေ) is a 1967 Burmese black-and-white drama film, directed by Thet Lal starring Win Oo, Tin Tin Mu and Tin Tin Aye.

== Cast ==
- Win Oo
- Tin Tin Mu
- Tin Tin Aye
