= Chit Khae Tar A Mhan Par Pae =

1958 Burmese Film

- Film Poster
- Burmese: ချစ်ခဲ့တာအမှန်ပါပဲ
- Directed by: Shwe Baw
- Starring: Myint Aung; Phoe Par Gyi; Kyi Kyi Htay
- Production company: Yangon Film
- Release date: July 4, 1958
- Running time: 90 minutes
- Country: Myanmar
- Language: Burmese

Chit Khae Tar A Mhan Par Pae (Burmese: ချစ်ခဲ့တာအမှန်ပါပဲ) is a 1958 Burmese drama film, directed by Shwe Baw, starring Myint Aung, Phoe Par Gyi and Kyi Kyi Htay. It was the first Burmese coloured feature motion picture with synchronized sound and was introduced to media on June 19, 1958, in Yangon. It was premiered to public on July 4, 1958, in Yangon. It was being released coloured feature motion picture but black and white films were made until early 1990s in Myanmar.

== Cast ==
- Myint Aung
- Phoe Par Gyi
- Kyi Kyi Htay
