= Maung Doh Cherry Myay =

1963 Burmese Film

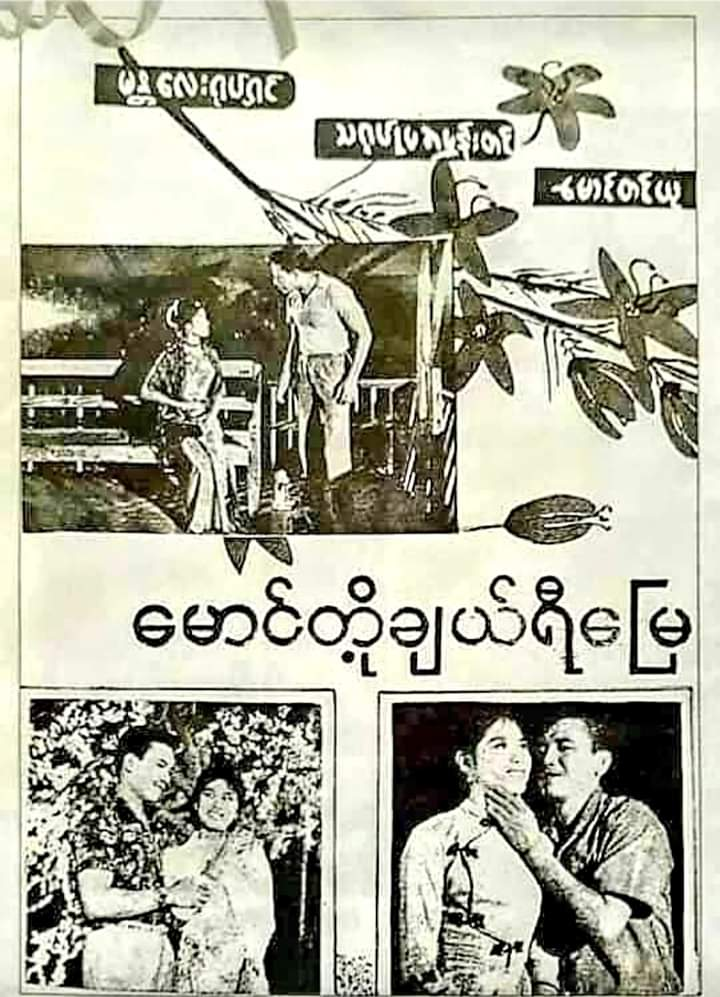
- Film poster
- Burmese: မောင်တို့ချယ်ရီမြေ
- Directed by: U Tin Yu
- Screenplay by: Win Oo
- Starring: Win Oo; Khin Than Nu
- Cinematography: U Maung Lay; Kyaw Soe; Ba Than
- Edited by: San Shwe Maung
- Production company: The Mandalay Film Limited
- Distributed by: The Mandalay Film Limited
- Release date: 1963
- Running time: 117 minutes
- Country: Myanmar
- Language: Burmese

Maung Doh Cherry Myay (Burmese: မောင်တို့ချယ်ရီမြေ) is a 1963 Burmese black-and-white drama film starring Win Oo and Khin Than Nu. The film showed the nice scene of Mandalay Thingyan Festival.

== Cast ==
- Win Oo as Mg Ko U
- Khin Than Nu as Khin Than Nu
