= Thamee Shin =

2000 Burmese Film

- Poster
- Burmese: သမီးရှင်
- Directed by: Khin Maung Oo & Soe Thein Htut
- Screenplay by: Khin Maung Oo & Soe Thein Htut
- Story by: Mi Ko Zu Zin
- Starring: Yan Aung; Dwe; Eaindra Kyaw Zin; Khin Than Nu
- Production company: Moe Kaung Kin Film Production
- Release date: 2000
- Running time: 137 minutes
- Country: Myanmar
- Language: Burmese

Thamee Shin (Burmese: သမီးရှင်) is a 2000 Burmese drama film, directed by Khin Maung Oo & Soe Thein Htut starring Yan Aung, Dwe, Eaindra Kyaw Zin and Khin Than Nu. Khin Than Nu won the Best Supporting Actress Award in 2000 Myanmar Motion Picture Academy Awards.

== Cast ==
- Yan Aung as Kyi Thar
- Dwe as Kaung Htet
- Khin Than Nu as Daw Mi Mi Latt
- Eaindra Kyaw Zin as Nge Nge Htun Kyaw
- Cho Pyone as Mother of Kaung Htet
- Myo Thandar Htun as May Mi Htun Kyaw
- Wyne as Min Lwin
- Soe Moe Kyi as Devi Htun Kyaw
- Sai Bo Bo as Wai Lwin

== Awards ==
Year	Award	Category	Nominee	Result
2000	Myanmar Motion Picture Academy Awards	Best Supporting Actress	Khin Than Nu	Won
