= Saw Mya Aye Kyi =

Traditional Burmese musician

Alinkar Kyawswa Saw Mya Aye Kyi
- စောမြအေးကြည်
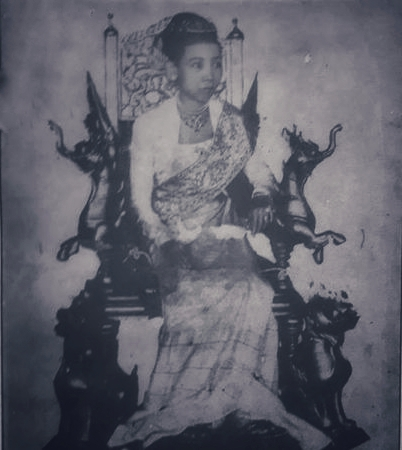
- Saw Mya Aye Kyi as royal mistress
- Born: Khin Sein Kyi; March 1892; Mandalay, British Burma
- Died: 10 February 1968 (aged 75); Yangon, Myanmar
- Occupation: Musician
- Spouses: Sir Sao Chel; Yagan U Tin
- Parents: Maung Maung Tin; Khin Phwar
- Awards: Alinkar Kyawswa (1952); Honorary Bachelor of Arts (1954); Sao Oakka; Siri Ukkațhavatī
- Musical career
- Genres: Mahāgīta
- Instruments: Vocals; Burmese harp
- Years active: 1904–1968

Saw Mya Aye Kyi (Burmese: စောမြအေးကြည်, 1892 – 1962) was a Burmese musician who specialized in performing the collection of Burmese classical songs known as the Mahāgīta. She was a royal mistress of Sir Sao Chel, Saopha of Hsipaw State. She has been dubbed as the "mother of Mahāgīta." A bronze bust of Saw Mya Aye Kyi stands outside the National Theatre of Mandalay.

== Early life ==
Saw Mya Aye Kyi was born in Mandalay to Maung Maung Tin, a royal privy council officer, and Khin Phwar, the property custodian of the Princess of Saw Hla. Her given name was Khin Sein Kyi. She was a descendant of the Prince of Swetawoak, a member of the Konbaung royal family.

== Royal mistress ==
At the age of 12, Saw Mya Aye Kyi started learning traditional singing and dancing at Manusadda Shwedaung Kyaw Thu U Lugyi. A year later she went to the Hsipaw Palace to continue studying the Mahāgīta. She married Sir Sao Chel, Saopha of Hsipaw, when she was 17.

Sir Sao Chel recognized her proficiency in various parts of the Mahāgīta, awarding her the title of Sao Okka at the age of 20. This was followed at age 22 by the title of Siri Ukkațhavatī, awarded for the patpyoe "Moe Deva". She also composed the patpyoe "Lamin Thawda" (lit. 'The Moon'). These were the last two songs to be included in the Mahāgīta.

Saw Mya Aye Kyi left Hsipaw Palace in 1928 and accompanied Yagan U Tin to Yangon. There she learned more traditional songs, eventually becoming regarded as the mother of the Mahāgīta.

== Later career ==
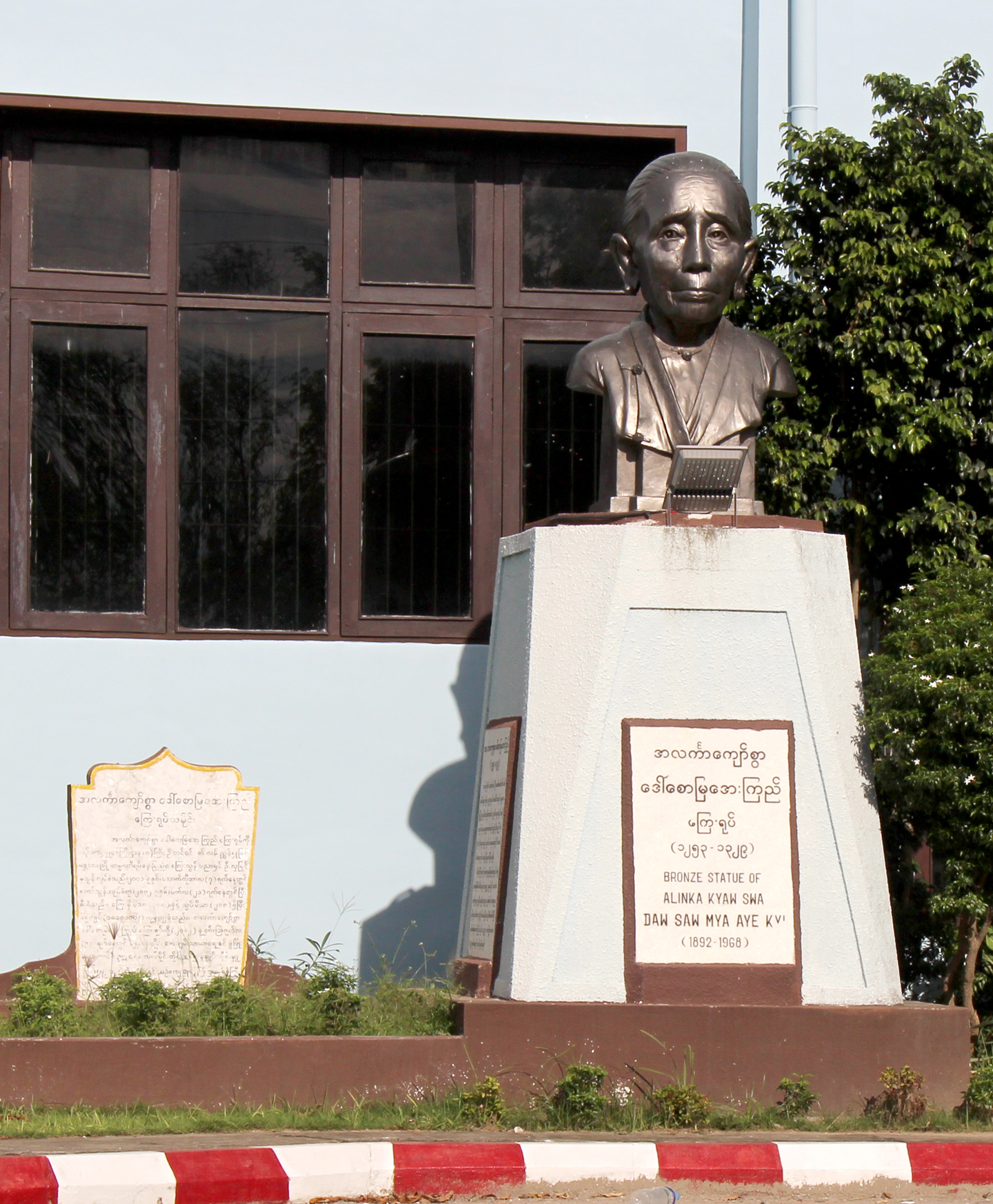
Bronze bust of Saw Mya Aye Kyi at the National Theatre of Mandalay.

Saw Mya Aye Kyi worked as a music teacher (pantya) until World War II, and tutored at the Yangon Music and Art School from 1953 to 1958. She was awarded the title of Alinkar Kyawswa by the government of Myanmar in 1952, honoring her contributions to the field of music. In 1954 she became the only person in Myanmar to receive an honorary Bachelor of Arts in the field of fine arts from the University of Yangon.

She worked for the History Commission as a music research fellow in 1962, and as a member of the Myanmar Radio and Television Mahāgīta music scrutiny board. She also served as chairwoman of the Myanmar Musical Instrument Federation. She continued to teach the Mahāgīta until her death. Tin Tin Mya was one of her students.

== Death ==
Saw Mya Aye Kyi died on February 10, 1968, in Yangon. Her hands and lips were gilded in accordance with tradition.
