= Tin Tin Mya =

Burmese singer (born 1936)

Tin Tin Mya တင်တင်မြ
- Born: 25 April 1936 (age 90); Rangoon, British Burma
- Genres: Burmese Classical Music
- Occupation: Singer
- Instrument: Vocals

Tin Tin Mya (Burmese: တင်တင်မြ; born 25 April 1936) is a Burmese singer. She is best known for her classical songs. She acted in one film named Ta Kyawt Hna Kyawt Tay Ko Thi, directed by Win Oo and sang a song of the same name in this film.

== Biography ==
Tin Tin Mya was born on 25 April 1936 in Rangoon, British Burma to U Than (also known a Shwe Maung Than), a music curator for the Voice of Burma (now MRTV), and his wife Tin Nyunt. She was the third eldest daughter of 6 children.

Tin Tin Mya entered the music industry between 1946 and 1947, under the tutelage of Saw Mya Aye Kyi. Throughout her early years, she studied the Mahagita classical genre under the guidance of prominent songstresses, including Kyi Aung, Sein Pati, Aye Mi, May Shin, and Kyi Kyi Htay. In 1948, she won first place in the patpyo category in a national Mahagita competition.

She launched her career with the kalabaw song "Shan Hta-ne" (ရှမ်းဌာနေ), followed by a hit, "Pe Phu Hlwa" (ပေဖူးလွှာ), written by Sein Wai Lyan. Throughout her career, she record hit songs for radio, records, soundtracks, and stereo. Among her most prominent hit songs include the Mahagita classic "Pan Myaing Le" (ပန်းမြိုင်လယ်), "Htoo Ma Cha Na" (ထူးမခြားနား), "Pan Hewan" (ပန်းဟေဝန်), "Hlyat Pan Khwe Nwe" (လျှပ်ပန်းခွေနွဲ့), "Mya Mya Maung Maung" (မြမြမောင်းမောင်း). In October 1957, she joined the Voice of Burma as a radio announcer, before retiring in 2006 as an assistant director of music.

== Personal life ==
In 1959, she wed A1 Soe Myint, a local music director. She currently resides in Tamwe Township, Yangon.
