= Shwe Ba =

Burmese film actor (1918–1988)

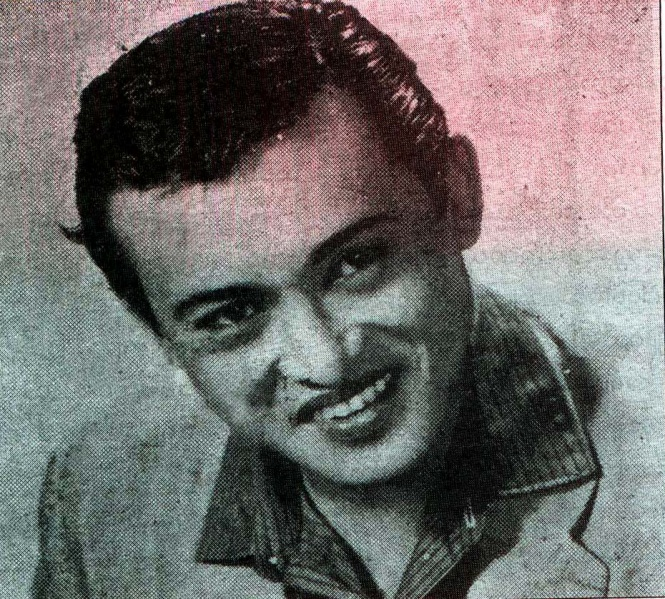
- Born: 30 March 1918; Pathein, British Burma
- Died: 1 December 1988 (aged 70); Myanmar
- Occupation(s): Actor, director
- Parent(s): Aung Myat; Kun

Aye Kyi (Burmese: အေးကြည်), better known by his stage name Shwe Ba (ရွှေဘ) (30 March 1918 – 1 December 1988), was a Burmese actor and director. He founded the film group known as Thamada Lu Gyan, which produced popular action films in the late 1940s.

In 1983, Shwe Ba was admitted to Yangon General Hospital for emergency surgery. He died from heart disease on 1 December 1988, at the age of 70.
