= Daisy Kyaw Win =

Burmese actress

Academy Daisy Kyaw Win
- ဒေစီကျော်ဝင်း
- Occupation: Actress
- Notable work: Arr Nwae Thu Par Shin; Maung Mu Paing Shin
- Awards: Myanmar Motion Picture Academy Awards (1971)

Daisy Kyaw Win (Burmese: ဒေစီကျော်ဝင်း) is a Burmese actress who won the Myanmar Academy Award in the 1971 film Arr Nwae Thu Par Shin. The 1964 film Maung Mu Paing Shin made her rise in popularity.

Her parents Kyaw Win and Tin Tin Mu also won the academy awards in 1952 and 1965 respectively; hence they became the first and only academy-winning family in history.

== Filmography ==
The following is the list of some well-known films starred by Daisy Kyaw Win.

1. Hna Yauk Htae Nay Chin Tal (1962) (နှစ်ယောက်ထဲနေချင်တယ်)
2. Maung Mu Paing Shin (1964) (မောင့်မူပိုင်ရှင်)
3. Banto Lu Kalay Hnint Thuzar (1968) (ဗန်တိုလူကလေးနှင့်သူဇာ)
4. The Thaung Yan Hmar Ma Khwar Yet Naing Tal (1968) (သည်သောင်ယံမှာ မခွာရက်နိုင်တယ်)
5. Pa Yin Yaung (1969) (ပယင်းရောင်)
6. Ngo Ywae Yal Ywae Ma Ya Thaw Myat Nar (1969) (ငို၍ရယ်၍မရသော မျက်နှာ)
7. Kyun Ma Mhar Main Ma Thar (1970) (ကျမမှာ မိန်မသား)
8. Arr Nwe Thu Par Shin (1971) (အားနွဲ့သူပါရှင်)
9. Hmae Ta Pout (1973) (မှဲ့တစ်ပေါက်)
10. Chit Han Saung Mone Thu Moh Lar (1977) (ချစ်ဟန်ဆောင်မုန်းသူမို့လား)

== Awards and nominations ==
Year	Award	Category	Nominated work	Result
1971	Myanmar Motion Picture Academy Awards	Best Actress	Arr Nwae Thu Par Shin (lit. 'I am a weak girl')	Won
