= Po Par Gyi =

- ဖိုးပါကြီး
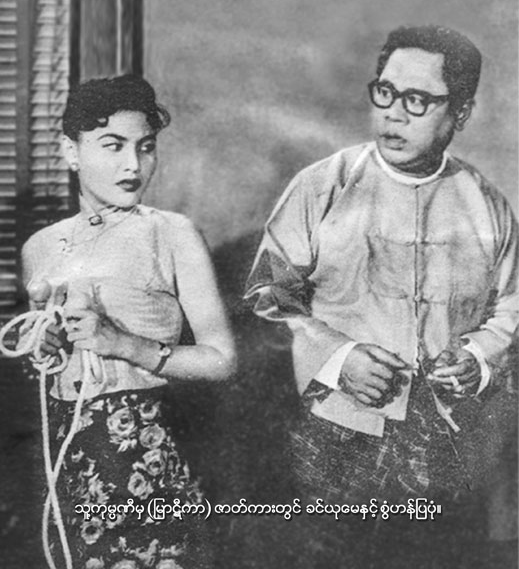
- Po Par Gyi and Khin Yu May
- Born: Nyunt Hlaing; March 1917; Pathein, British Burma
- Died: January 14, 1980 (aged 62); Yangon, Burma
- Years active: 1938 - 1980
- Spouses: Khin Myaing; May Chit
- Parent(s): U San Pe and Daw Hla
- Awards: Wunna Kyawhtin (1) Po Pyonn Cho (1955) (2) Ta Kha Ga Ta Bawa (1978)

Po Par Gyi (Burmese: ဖိုးပါကြီး, pronounced [pʰó pà dʑí]; March 1917 – January 14, 1980) was a popular traditional Burmese opera performer and two-time Myanmar Academy Award winning actor known for his comic roles.

== Biography ==
Po Par Gyi was born Nyunt Hlaing in Bassein, Irrawaddy Division (now Pathein, Ayeyarwady Region) to San Pe, a customs Inspector and his wife Hla. He graduated from Hinthada Government High School in 1936. Pursuing his interest in singing and dancing, he got his first break in 1938 with a starring role in a silent film Lu Pyo Tho produced by the Rangoon Film Company.

But he would achieve fame in traditional Burmese opera. During the Japanese occupation (1942–1945), he moved to Yangon and became an opera actor in Director Kyaw Aye's Ye Ye Khaw Daw Opera. He continued to gain success in opera after Burmese independence in 1948. His notable opera performances include Pyo Letsaung, Nge Kyun Swe, and Ko Kyait Ta Ko Loat. Between 1960 and 1961, he starred in the renowned opera Po Par Gyi. His best opera performances are considered to be Chin Taung Nga Lone and Gon Ne Marna.

Po Par Gyi also found success in films as a comic actor and focused on his film career from the 1960s onwards. He starred in dozens of movies from the 1940s until his death in 1980.

== Awards ==
In 1958, he was awarded the title Wunna Kyawhtin, the highest honor given to an artist by the Burmese government. He also won two Burmese Academy Awards, for his roles in Phoe Pyonn Cho (1955) and Ta Kha Ga Ta Bawa (1978).

== Filmography ==
- Phoe Pyonn Cho (1955)
- Chit Khae Tar A Mhan Par Pae (1958)
- Tein Hlwar Moht Moht Lwin (1967)
- Kyaukme A Kyin Thar (1969)
- Hmone Shwe Yee (1970)
- Ta Kha Ga Ta Bawa (1978)
