= Bogalay Tint Aung =

Burmese composer, director and writer (1922–2021)

Sithu Bogalay Tint Aung
- ဗိုလ်ကလေးတင့်အောင်
- Born: Tint Aung; 3 June 1922; Bogale, Pyapon District, Ayeyarwady Division, British Burma, British Raj
- Died: 16 December 2021 (aged 99); Yangon, Burma
- Occupation(s): Composer, director and writer
- Years active: 1940–2021
- Notable work: Pann Wingaba; Nge Kywan Swe
- Awards: Excellent Performance in Social Field (First Class); Excellent Performance in Arts (First Class); Myanmar National Literature Award (1996); Sithu title (2012); Myanmar Motion Picture Academy Awards (Lifetime Achievement Award (Everlasting Outstanding Honorary Award)) (2017); Myanmar's Pride Awards (Lifetime Achievement Award) (2019)

Bogalay Tint Aung (Burmese: ဗိုလ်ကလေးတင့်အောင်; 3 June 1922 – 16 December 2021) was a Burmese composer, director and writer. The first recipient of the Myanmar Academy Award for lifetime achievement, Tint Aung was a patron of the Myanmar Motion Picture Organisation.

== Early life and education ==
Tint Aung, the second of six siblings, was born on 3 June 1922 in Bogale, Pyapon District, Ayeyarwady Division to U Ba Thin and Daw Phwar Thein. His younger brother Maung Ko Ko is also a musician.

When a labor strike broke out in Burma, in 1938, Tint Aung dropped out of school in the 8th grade and took part in the revolution. He joined the Burma Independence Army (BIA) in 1942, alongside Bo Aung Myint, Bo San Shar and Bo Than.

== Career ==
Tint Aung made his career debut in 1948 as the author of the play Myat Mon Yadana. He started his stage director career with the 1950 play Apyone Lethsaung (lit. 'Smile Gift'). His works include Thet Saing Thu Thoh, New Year Chit Oo, Thanyawzin, Mon Toh Htar Nay, May Myat Nwe, Myet Wun Lae Pyar Pyar, Zayar, Jin Malay Jann, and Mhway Lwon Thih Pann. His 1975 play Nge Kyawn Swe was a remake of the film of the same name.

Pann Wingaba, an anthology of his newspaper articles from 1980 to 1982, won the 1996 Myanmar National Literature Award for belles-lettres. He was also honored with the first-class medals for excellent performance in social field and in arts by the Burmese government.

Tint Aung received the title of Sithu in 2012. In 2018, he was awarded the Myanmar Motion Picture Academy Award for lifetime achievement for the year 2017.

He died in Yangon on 16 December 2021, at the age of 99.

== Awards ==
Awards and nominations
Year	Award	Category	Nominated Work	Result
1996	Myanmar National Literature Award	Belles-lettres	Pann Wingaba	Won
2012	Order of the Union of Burma	Sithu	—	Won
2017	Myanmar Motion Picture Academy Awards	Lifetime Achievement Award (Everlasting Outstanding Honorary Award)	—	Won
