= Shwe Pyi Aye =

Burmese musician and composer

Alinka Kyawswa Shwe Pyi Aye
- ရွှေပြည်အေး
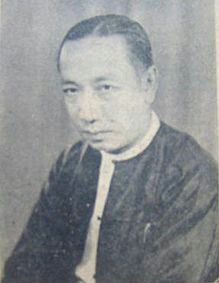
- Born: Tin Maung Aye; 13 February 1909; Rangoon, British rule in Burma
- Died: 22 October 1977 (aged 68); Yangon, Burma
- Education: Rangoon University, Yale University
- Occupations: Musician, Composer
- Parent(s): U Nu (father); Daw Hlaing (mother)
- Awards: Alinkar Kyawswar

Shwe Pyi Aye (Burmese: ရွှေပြည်အေး; born Tin Maung Aye 13 February 1909 – 22 October 1977) was a Burmese musician and composer.

== Biography ==
Shwe Pyi Aye was born in Yangon in Burma during British rule on 13 February 1909 to his father, the amateur pianist U Nu and his mother, Daw Hlaing. He was the fourth son of five siblings.

At the age of five, he started learning the basics of rhythm from his uncle, a Burmese harp artist. At the age of 8 he was able to play and sing by himself. At the age of 10, he had mastered the violin. Growing up with violinists Nyein, U Ba Thwin, and Ko Ba Yee's mastered the violin while still young. He became a violinist by the musical direction of violinist U Ba Latt and Ko Ba Yee. He became proficient in the piano under the musical direction of U Thar Din and became known as pianist Maung Aye in the 1930s. When the tape was first recorded at Columbia Records in 1932, the name "Shwe Pyi Aye" was assigned by Benjo Ko Nit and Ma Kyi Aung.

The piano playing style of Shwe Pyi Aye became innovative. "When a film scene disappeared, the music disappeared." As soon as the next film scene continued, the music changed suddenly. At the time no one was better than Shwe Pyi Aye in finding songs that fit the plot. He was a good songwriter and was able to adapt to the story when film companies hired him.

Burmese films with sound began to appear in 1932, starting with the film "Ngwe Pay Lo Ma Ya". But silent films continued to be produced without reduction. Shwe Pyi Aye was a musician for many years as a film music composer both in many silent films and in films with sound. From the era of independence to the late 1960s, academy pianist Hla Htut wrote that it would not be wrong to call it the "Shwe Pyi Aye era" of movie songs. Pianist Hla Htut also wrote that more than half of the popular movie songs of the period were the works of Sayar Shwe Pyi Aye.

In Mawlamyaing, during the screening of "Shwe Hnin Si" film, the song "Pan Hay Wan", was performed by Shwe Pyi Aye playing the music to accompany the vocalist Pyi Ba Shin. The film watchers from the Mawlamyaing Film theater were surprised by this. When Shwe Pyi Aye returned to Yangon he practiced with Ma Aye Mi for the song "Pan Hay Won" and also co-sang and played music in silent films. He became famous in the music world. He was recorded practicing the song " Pan Hay Won" with Ma Aye Mi in Columbia Record; the tape was released in July 1935 by the favour of company manager Mr. Katt and the song "Pan Hay Won" became popular throughout Burma. "Pan Hay Won", a song of Shwe Pyi Aye and Ma Aye Mi was became well-known music and is still popular in Myanmar today.

In 1954, he was awarded the "Alinkar Kyawswar" title by the state for his portrayal of Burmese culture.

== Death ==
He died on 22 October 1977.
