= Kyi Soe Tun =

Sithu Kyi Soe Tun
- ကြည်စိုးထွန်း
- Born: 9 December 1945 (age 80); Yangon, British Burma
- Years active: 1977 – present
- Parent(s): U Tun and Daw Hla
- Awards: Doe (Best Director, 1989); Thu Kyun Ma Khan Bi (Best Director, 1997); Upstream (Best Director, 2002); Hexagon (Best Director, 2006); Hexagon (Best Screenplay, 2006)

Kyi Soe Tun (Burmese: ကြည်စိုးထွန်း, pronounced [tɕì só tʰʊ́ɰ̃]; born 9 December 1945) is a five-time Myanmar Academy Award winning film director, producer and screenwriter of Burmese cinema. He served as the chairman of the Myanmar Motion Picture Organization.

== Biography ==
Kyi Soe Tun is the son of Daw Hla and her husband U Tun in Yangon. He received a Bachelor of Science degree from Yangon University. He began his film career in 1977, and first served as director in 1980 in the film Chan Myay Pa Say. He won five national awards academy.

== Filmography ==
Kyi Soe Tun's films include:

- Sone Yay or Downstream (1990)
- San Yay or Upstream, about a boy who is raised in a monastery after he is abandoned by his parents. Searching for them, he discovers Buddhism.
- Thu Kyun Ma Khan Bi or Never Shall We Be Enslaved (1997) is about the last king of Burma, Thibaw Min. British and French colonialists interfere in the internal affairs of the Burmese kingdom which leads to its destruction and a subsequent revolt to regain independence. (See also History of Myanmar.)
- Sacrificial Heart (2004) is a drama set in the Pagan Kingdom. In 1074, King Anawrahta sent his son, General Kyansittha to help the Mon people overcome invaders. Kyanzittha fell in love with the Mon king's wife, thus beginning a love triangle amidst the war.
- True Love (2005) is about a romance between a Japanese man and a young Burmese woman.
- Hexagon (2006) is a comedy about six pregnant women who are very optimistic about the future of their children to be.
