= Khin Yu May =

Myanmar Academy Award winning actress (1937–2014)

- ခင်ယုမေ
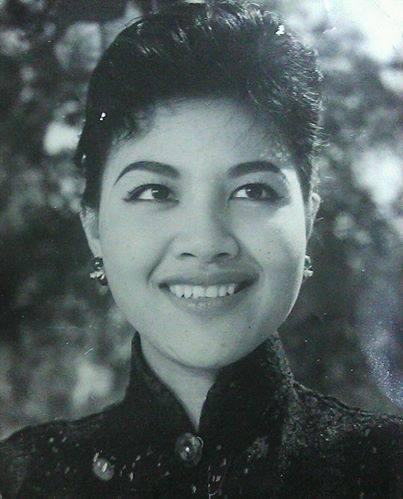
- Born: March 23, 1937; Rangoon, British Burma
- Died: 23 January 2014 (aged 76); Yangon, Myanmar
- Resting place: Yayway Cemetery
- Occupation: Actress
- Years active: 1958–2008
- Parent(s): Yu Swan; Kyin Myan
- Awards: Myanmar Academy Award

Khin Yu May (Burmese: ခင်ယုမေ, pronounced [kʰɪ̀ɰ̃ jṵ mè]; 23 March 1937 – 23 January 2014) was a two-time Myanmar Academy Award winning actress and singer.

== Biography ==
She was born on 23 March 1937 in Yangon, Myanmar, daughter of U Yu Swan and Daw Kyin Myaing. Her sister, Khin Yu Swe, is a singer. In 1953, she began her recording career with the song May Pan Chi written by Myo Ma Thi. In 1958, she crossed over to films with a role in A-Thet by famous director Chin Sein, and I Bawa We, directed by Po Par Gyi. The Three B Company signed her to do three films, and selected her to star in the film Bo Mya Din. She won two Myanmar Academy Awards in her career: in Ko Paing Myitta in 1961 and Shwe Chi Ngwe Chi Tan Ba Lo in 1975.

She died on 23 January 2014 at the age of 76 in Yangon and cremated at Yayway Cemetery.

== Filmography ==
- A Thet (1958)
- I Bawa We (1958)
- Bo Mya Din
- Ko Paing Myitta (1961)
- Shwe Chi Ngwe Chi Tan Ba Lo (1975)
- Pale Myetyay
- Pan Dway Ne Way
- Hmwe Lunn thee Pan
- Chit A Mhya
- Tacha Gaba Ga Chit-Thu Ye
- Pon Pama
- Hlaing Hteit-hta Ne Kyan Taing Aung

== Discography ==
- Yaing De Zinyaw
- Myie Lae Lay Nae Kaw
- Thet-Hsaing Thu Go
- Sakar Tekkatho
