= Wah Wah Win Shwe =

Burmese actress

- ဝါဝါဝင်းရွှေ
- Born: 30 December 1943 (age 81); Rangoon, Burma
- Occupation: Actress
- Spouse: Than Htut (m. 1971)
- Children: Win Htut Win; Wa Zin
- Parent(s): Tun Shwe; Than Tin
- Awards: Myanmar Motion Picture Academy Awards (1965, 1969, 1977)

Wah Wah Win Shwe (Burmese: ဝါဝါဝင်းရွှေ, also spelt War War Win Shwe) is a three-time Myanmar Academy Award winning Burmese film actress. She is considered one of the most commercially successful actresses in the Myanmar entertainment industry.

== Early life and education ==
She was born on 30 December 1943 to Tun Shwe and Than Tin in Rangoon, Burma, the youngest of four children. She attended Methodist English High School and enrolled at Rangoon University for higher education.

== Film career ==
She began her career in film at the age of 16, with her debut film, Seit (စိတ်, lit. "Mind"). Throughout the course of her career, she has starred in hundreds of films and directed over 50. She won three Myanmar Motion Picture Academy Awards, for her work in Chit Thami (Lovely Daughter) in 1965, Chaung Ko Pyit Ywe Myit Ko Sha in 1969, and Meingalay Shin Ei Sanda in 1977.

== Business interests ==
She founded the Wah Wah Win Shwe Film Production company in 1970. She also has interests in real estate, particularly in Yangon. She owns Su Htoo Pan Cinema. In 2012, she began work with Great Father Land Construction to redevelop the site of the historic cinema into a 14-storey condominium. In 2013, contractual disputes surfaced between the two parties, with Wah Wah Win Shwe claiming that the company had performed occult rituals on the site. The company accused her of retreating from an agreement to pay 1.2 billion kyat to build the tower and subsequently filed a defamation lawsuit in late June. In July of that year, Father Land Construction withdrew the lawsuit and cited her inability to pay for the remaining costs of construction.

== Personal life ==
Wah Wah Win Shwe wed Than Htut, an actor, in 1971. They have two sons, Win Htut Win and Wa Zin. She is reported to have been romantically linked to Kokang ‘War lady’ Olive Yang. In the 1960s, Olive began a romantic relationship with her, making headlines when the Wah Wah Win Shwe was put onto the deed of one of Olive's houses in Yangon. Wah Wah Win Shwe has since maintained that the two were only friends.
