= Aung Lwin =

Arakanese actor and director

- အောင်လွင်
- Born: 23 October 1935 (age 90); Akyab, British Burma
- Other names: San Shwe Maung, Ba Gyi Aung
- Years active: 1957 - present
- Spouse: Daw A Mee
- Parent(s): Aung Kyaw Zan; Daw Kywe
- Awards: Myanmar Academy Award (Best Supporting Actor) in Naw Kue Ma in 1974

Aung Lwin (Burmese: အောင်လွင် [àʊɰ̃ lwɪ̀ɰ̃]; born 23 October 1935) is a Myanmar Academy Award winning Burmese actor and director, having made his film debut in 1957.

== Early life and career ==
Aung Lwin was born in Sittwe, Rakhine State, Myanmar. His parents are of ethnic Rakhine, U Aung Kyaw Zan and Daw Kywe. He also studied at No.3, Basic Education High School, Botahtaung, for about five years. He made his film debut in 1957 and starred in the 2004 film Naug Ma Kja Kyay. He also directed the Myanmar film Moe Goke Set Wyne Ko Kyaw Lun Yeuh (Beyond the Horizon). He is a board member of Myanmar Academy Awards selection committee of the Myanmar Motion Picture Organisation. He resigned from the Myanmar Academy Awards selection committee in July 2014. When he acts as a director, he uses the name "San Shwe Maung". Nowadays, he is the manager of the archive, spearheading the movement to preserve these important artefacts. He is usually starred with another Rakhine actor Nay Toe in some of his films.

== Filmography ==
- Tein Hlwar Moht Moht Lwin (1967)
- Kyaukme A Kyin Thar (1969)
- Hmone Shwe Yee (1970)
- Moe Nya Einmet Myu (2009)
- A Tway (1962)
- Nge Kywan Swe (1968)
- Naw Kue Ma (1974)
- Beyond the Horizon (director)
- Nay Kyauk Khae (1983)
- Nauk Ma Kya Kyay
- Hatred in The Wind (2010)
- Pin Lay Yay Kan Nwe Mar Kan (2010)
- A Mhway Sein (2011)
- A Mhone Lwan Thaw (2011)
- Ko Lu Pyo Gee & Juliet (2011)
- Country's famous actress husband (2012)
- Tha Ye Tacay Shi Lar (2013)
- Wife's Relative (2014)
- Pan Pyu Sa Tay Nya (2014)
- Online Ghost (2015)
- Kingdom of Mrauk U Opera (2016)
- Mhway Chet Chet Tay Myer Nay Tay (2018)
- Nhay Par Thwar Update (2019)
- Problem (2019)
- Longing with Love (2020)
