= Aye Aye Thin =

Burmese actress, model, and singer (1945–2020)

- အေးအေးသင်း
- Born: 23 September 1945; Myanmar
- Died: 17 December 2020 (aged 75)
- Occupations: Actress; singer
- Parent(s): Boe Waie; Khin Mya
- Awards: Myanmar Academy Award (1971, 1973)

Aye Aye Thin (Burmese: အေးအေးသင်း; 23 September 1945 – 17 December 2020) was a two-time Myanmar Academy Award-winning Burmese actress and singer.

Aye won her first Best Supporting Actress Myanmar Academy Award in 1971 with the film Maya Htaunggyauk (မာယာထောင်ချောက်) and in 1973 with the film Za Khan Si Naukkwe Hma (ဇာခန်းစီးနောက်ကွယ်မှာ).

== Death ==
She died of a heart attack on 17 December 2020.
