= Khin Than Nu =

Burmese actress

- ခင်သန်းနု
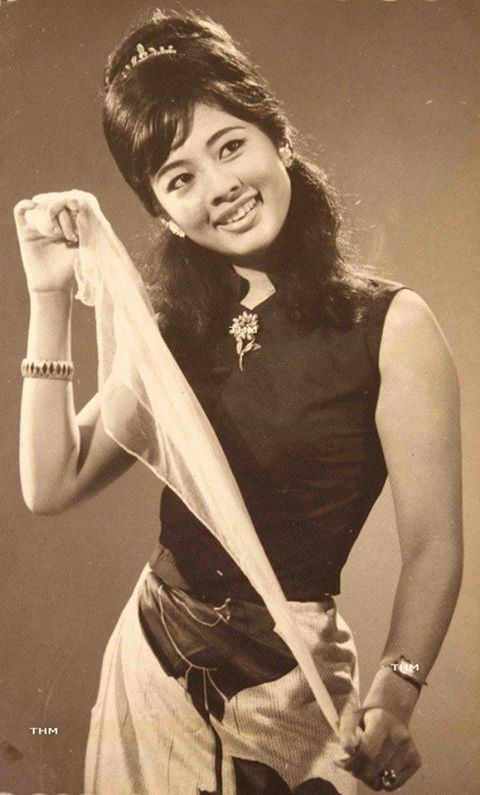
- Born: December 7, 1945 (age 80); Pyinmana, British Burma
- Occupation: Actress
- Spouses: Myat Thura Soe (m. 1988) Maung Maung Khin (m. 1975; div. 1988)
- Children: Wai Yan Min Khin (son); Hnin Hla Nu (daughter); Myat Than Nu Soe (daughter)
- Parent(s): U Aung Than; Daw Nu
- Awards: Miss Pyinmana pageant, Miss Mandalay pageant, Miss Ottara pageant, Miss Union Burma pageant (1961), Myanmar Motion Picture Academy Awards (Best Leading Actress for 1967, 1990), (Best Supporting Actress for 2000)

Khin Than Nu (Burmese: ခင်သန်းနု, [kʰɪ̀ɰ̃ θáɰ̃ nṵ]; born 7 December 1945) is a Myanmar Motion Picture Academy Awards-winning Burmese actress, winning Best Actress in 1967, 1990 and 2000. In Myanmar, Khin Than Nu is recognized as the most beautiful actress of all time.

== Early life ==
Khin Than Nu was born on December 7, 1945, in Pyinmana, British Burma to parents U Aung Than and Daw Nu, and is the eldest of four children.

== Career ==
She began her career, after winning the 1961 Miss Pyidaungzu Beauty Pageant. Her debut film was Tint Hla Pay Han ( တင့်လှပေဟန် ), directed by Maung Thin ( မောင်သင် ).

Khin Than Nu was romantically involved with many well-known actors in the Burmese movie industry, including Shwe Ba, Tin Nyunt, Win Oo, Sein Myint and Myat Lay. In 1975, she married Colonel Maung Maung Khin and had a son, Wai Yan Min Khin, as well as a daughter, Hnin Hla Nu.

In 1988, Khin Than Nu divorced Colonel Maung Maung Khin and married Dr. Myat Thura Soe. The couple had a daughter, Myat Than Nu Soe.

== Filmography ==
- Maung Doe Cherry Myay (1963)
- Maung Mu Paing Shin (1964)
- Ko Yal Toe Yal Soe Soe Yal (1967)
- Kyaukme A Kyin Thar (1969)
- Hmone Shwe Yee (1970)
- Kanyar Pyo Nae Zayar Ao (1972)
- Thingyan Moe (1985)
- Khun Hna Sin A Lwan (1990)
- Thamee Shin (2000)

== Awards ==
Year	Award	Category	Nominated work	Result
1967	Myanmar Motion Picture Academy Awards	Best Actress	Ko Yal Toe Yal Soe Soe Yal	Won
1990	Myanmar Motion Picture Academy Awards	Best Actress	Khun Hna Sin A Lwan	Won
2000	Myanmar Motion Picture Academy Awards	Best Supporting Actress	Thamee Shin	Won
