= Chit Tae Yet Ko Kyo Nay Mal =

1983 Burmese Film

- Film poster
- Burmese: ချစ်တဲ့ရက်ကိုကြိုနေမယ်
- Directed by: U Tin Yu
- Screenplay by: Ko Ko
- Story by: Daung Nwe Swe
- Starring: Collegian Ne Win; Kyaw Hein; San Shar Tin; Nwet Nwet Mu
- Cinematography: Ba Swe; Aye Ko; Kyaw Lwin
- Edited by: Maung Myint Khine; Maung Maung Toe; Tin Nyein
- Music by: Maung Ko Ko
- Production company: Thu Marlar Films
- Release date: July 29, 1983
- Running time: 112 minutes
- Country: Myanmar
- Language: Burmese

Chit Tae Yet Ko Kyo Nay Mal (Burmese: ချစ်တဲ့ရက်ကိုကြိုနေမယ်) is a 1983 Burmese black-and-white drama film, directed by U Tin Yu starring Collegian Ne Win, Kyaw Hein, San Shar Tin and Nwet Nwet Mu. The title theme song of the film was sung by Swe Zin Htaik.

== Cast ==
- Collegian Ne Win as U Ne Win
- Kyaw Hein as Kyaw Hein
- San Shar Tin as Daw San Shar Tin
- Nwet Nwet Mu as Nwet Nwet Mu
- Aung Lwin as Aung Lwin
- Kyauk Lone as U Kyauk Lone
- May Thit as Daw May Thit
- May Nwet as Daw May Nwet
- Kyaw Win as U Kyaw Win
- May Lwin as May Lwin
