= Pyin Ma Ngote To =

1981 Burmese Film

- poster
- Burmese: ပျဉ်းမငုတ်တို
- Directed by: Maung Hla Myo
- Screenplay by: Tekkatho Maung Hla Thu
- Story by: Khin Maung Win
- Produced by: Sein Hlaing
- Starring: Collegian Ne Win; Kyaw Hein; Nwet Nwet Mu; Yin Yin Aye; Eant Kyaw
- Cinematography: Chit Min Lu; Naing Nu Shein
- Edited by: Maung Hla Myo; Ko Net Too; Phoe Si; Aye Chan
- Music by: Sandayar Chit Swe
- Production company: Kyaw Soe Films
- Release date: 1981
- Running time: 119 minutes
- Country: Myanmar
- Language: Burmese

Pyin Ma Ngote To (Burmese: ပျဉ်းမငုတ်တို) is a 1981 Burmese black-and-white drama film, directed by starring Collegian Ne Win, Kyaw Hein, Nwet Nwet Mu, Yin Yin Aye and Eant Kyaw.

== Cast ==
- Collegian Ne Win as Chit San
- Kyaw Hein as Maung Too
- Nwet Nwet Mu as Khin Nu
- Yin Yin Aye as Mi Cho
- Eant Kyaw as Say Yoe
