= Sandar (actress) =

Burmese actress

- စန္ဒာ
- Born: San San Shin; 22 March 1949; Rangoon, Burma
- Died: 23 December 2006 (aged 57)
- Education: Basic Education High School No. 2 Sanchaung
- Occupation: Actress
- Spouse(s): Kyaw Hein; Zaw Lin
- Parents: Mya Maung (father); Marla Myint (mother)
- Relatives: Khin Oo Maw; Win Mar; Toe Nyunt (Shwe Gaung Pyaung); Mya Zaw (Fuji); Swe Lin
- Awards: Myanmar Academy Award (Best Actress for 1967)

Sandar (Burmese: စန္ဒာ; 22 March 1949 – 23 December 2006) was a Burmese actress. She won the Myanmar Academy Award for Best Actress in 1967 with the film Nhaitmwa Athel.

== Early life ==
Sanda was born on March 22, 1949, in Rangoon, Burma to parents Mya Maung and Marla Myint. Her birth name was San San Shin (စန်းစန်းရှင်). She was the fourth oldest of her siblings Khin Oo Maw, Win Mar, Swe Lin, Toe Nyunt, Sanda and Mya Zaw (Fuji). Her siblings also worked in the film industry.

== Career ==
While Sanda was studying at Basic Education High School No. 2 Sanchaung she starred in a number of films under her stage name. She gained recognition as the young version of Win Mar in films such as 1953's Yadanarbon (ရတနာပုံ) and in 1995's Pho Pyone Cho (ဖိုးပြုံးချို). She became popular and later starred in many other famous films such as Akyaw Amaw (အကျော်အမော်), Naung Thitsar (နှောင်းသစ္စာ), Swetae Metta (စွဲတဲ့ မေတ္တာ), Metta Shwe Yi (မေတ္တာရွှေရည်) and Min Htin Shwe Hmone (မင်းထင်ရွှေမှန်).

In 1967, she starred in two separate roles in director Tin Maung's film Nhaitmwa Athel (နှစ်မွှာအသည်း), winning her the Myanmar Academy Award for Best Actress in 1967. The film also won the best director award and the photography award. In the film, Sanda plays the role of a boy with short hair, which influenced many young girls to cut their hair short. The hairstyle was known as Sanda hair.

In the romance film Metta, she co-starred with actor Kyaw Hein, whom she later married. During her marriage she acted in many films such as Tahkyethkote Nhaithkyet Pyat, Phusar Lansone and Aywe Yine. After her troubled marriage, she and Kyaw Hein divorced and she left the film industry. After a long hiatus from the film industry, she co-starred with her brother Win Hlaing in the film Shwe Gaung Pyaung (ရွှေဂေါင်းပြောင်). She also co-starred with actor Tiger Ko Myint in Rupamala. In her last film she co-starred with Moht Moht Myint Aung and Yan Aung in the film Mae Thida Lo Main Galay (မယ်သီတာလို မိန်းကလေး). She later remarried, to second husband Zaw Lin and retired from acting.

== Filmography ==
- Phoo Sar Lan Sone (1969)
- Nu Nu Nge Nge (1970)
- Chit Thu Yway Mal Chit Wae Lal (1975)
- Shwe Gaung Pyaung (1976)

== Death ==
Sanda died on December 23, 2006, at the age of 58.
