= Ta Oo Ka Saytanar Ta Oo Ka Myittar =

1976 Burmese Film

- Film poster
- Burmese: တစ်ဦးကစေတနာတစ်ဦးကမေတ္တာ
- Directed by: Thukha
- Screenplay by: Thukha
- Based on: Ma Hla Pay Mae Chit Tat Thu by Kauk Hlaine
- Starring: Collegian Ne Win; Kyaw Hein; Tin Tin Nyo
- Cinematography: Maung Kyi; Soe Khin; Thein Zaw
- Music by: Maung Ko Ko
- Production company: Aung Tay Za Films
- Release date: 1976
- Running time: 96 minutes
- Country: Myanmar
- Language: Burmese

Ta Oo Ka Saytanar Ta Oo Ka Myittar (Burmese: တစ်ဦးကစေတနာတစ်ဦးမေတ္တာ) is a 1976 Burmese black-and-white drama film, directed by Thukha starring Collegian Ne Win, Kyaw Hein and Tin Tin Nyo.

== Cast ==
- Collegian Ne Win as Saya Chit
- Kyaw Hein as Bo
- Tin Tin Nyo as Khin Moe
- May Thit as Daw May Thit
- Kyauk Lone as U Aung
