= Mahuyar =

1976 Burmese Film

- Film poster
- Burmese: မဟူရာ
- Directed by: Win Pe
- Starring: Htun Wai; Collegian Ne Win; Kyaw Hein; Myint Myint Khin; San Shar Tin; Nwet Nwet Mu
- Production company: Yan Kin Films
- Release date: July 15, 1976
- Running time: 100 minutes
- Country: Myanmar
- Language: Burmese

Mahuyar (Burmese: မဟူရာ) is a 1976 Burmese black-and-white drama film, directed by Win Pe starring Htun Wai, Collegian Ne Win, Kyaw Hein, Myint Myint Khin and San Shar Tin, Nwet Nwet Mu.

== Cast ==
- Htun Wai as U Ba Nyo
- Collegian Ne Win as U Tin Maung
- Kyaw Hein as Yan Aung
- Myint Myint Khin as Daw Mi Mi Yee
- San Shar Tin as Daw Tin Mi
- Nwet Nwet Mu as Kyi Kyi Htun
