= Kyoe Tann =

2008 Burmese Film

- Film poster
- Burmese: ကြိုးတန်း
- Directed by: Mee Pwar
- Screenplay by: Nay Win Myint
- Based on: Kyoe Tann by Khin Khin Htoo
- Produced by: U Khin Maung Zaw; Daw Aye Aye Min
- Starring: Kyaw Hein; Kyaw Ye Aung; Soe Myat Thuzar; Htun Eaindra Bo
- Cinematography: Than Nyunt
- Production company: Nal Thit Oo Films
- Release date: 2008
- Running time: 105 minutes
- Country: Myanmar
- Language: Burmese

Kyoe Tann (Burmese: ကြိုးတန်း) is a 2008 Burmese drama film, directed by Mee Pwar starring Kyaw Hein, Kyaw Ye Aung, Soe Myat Thuzar and Htun Eaindra Bo. It was based on the popular novel "Kyoe Tann", written by Khin Khin Htoo. It was the last film of Kyaw Hein.

== Cast ==
- Kyaw Hein as Kyauk Ni
- Kyaw Ye Aung as Hla Saung
- Soe Myat Thuzar as Ma Kyawt
- Htun Eaindra Bo as Hla Sein
- Zaw Win Naing as Nga Oar

== Award ==
Year	Award	Category	Nominee	Result
2008	Myanmar Motion Picture Academy Awards	Best Cinematography	Than Nyunt	Won
