= Pa Yin Yaung =

1969 Burmese Film

- Photo from movie
- Burmese: ပယင်းရောင်
- Directed by: Khin Soe
- Screenplay by: Pyae Sone
- Based on: A Yet Tha Mar by Phoe Kyar
- Starring: Collegian Ne Win; Daisy Kyaw Win; May Thit; Kyauk Lone
- Cinematography: U Par
- Production company: Thudamasari Films
- Release date: 1969
- Running time: 149 minutes
- Country: Myanmar
- Language: Burmese

Pa Yin Yaung (Burmese: ပယင်းရောင်) is a 1969 Burmese black-and-white drama film, directed by Khin Soe starring Collegian Ne Win, Daisy Kyaw Win, May Thit and Kyauk Lone.

== Cast ==
- Kawleikgyin Ne Win as Ba Khet
- Daisy Kyaw Win as Htway Yee, Hla Hla (dual role)
- May Thit as Daw May Thit
- Kyauk Lone as Kyauk Lone
- Gyan Sein as Daw Saw
- Jolly Swe as Jolly

== Award ==
Year	Award	Category	Nominee	Result
1969	Myanmar Motion Picture Academy Awards	Best Actor	Collegian Ne Win	Won
