= Kanyar Pyo Nae Zayar Ao =

1972 Burmese Film

- Burmese: ကညာပျိုနဲ့ဇရာအို
- Directed by: Bake Ka Lar Tae Ngan Pyar Yay
- Screenplay by: Maung Nay Myo
- Produced by: Htun Tin
- Starring: Collegian Ne Win; Kyaw Hein; Khin Than Nu; San Shar Tin
- Cinematography: Hla Ngwe; Soe Myint; Han Nyunt
- Edited by: Hla Shwe
- Music by: Maung Ko Ko
- Production company: Kyaw Soe Films
- Release date: 1972
- Running time: 128 minutes
- Country: Myanmar
- Language: Burmese

Kanyar Pyo Nae Zayar Ao (Burmese: ကညာပျိုနဲ့ဇရာအို) is a 1972 Burmese black-and-white drama film, directed by Bake Ka Lar Tae Ngan Pyar Yay starring Collegian Ne Win, Kyaw Hein, Khin Than Nu and San Shar Tin.

== Plot ==
Dr. Aung Zeya (Collegian Ne Win) is the legal guardian of Kyaw Kyaw (Kyaw Hein). Kyaw Kyaw has started to date an actress, Win Pa Pa (Khin Than Nu). Dr. Aung and his wife, Htar, do not approve of the youngsters relationship.

Later, the actress tries to flirt with the doctor and he falls for it. Hilarity & frustration ensue as the older man tries to conceal the affair from his wife, his work and social circle.

== Cast ==
- Collegian Ne Win as Dr. Aung Zeya
- Kyaw Hein as Kyaw Kyaw
- Khin Than Nu as Win Pa Pa
- San Shar Tin as Htar
- Khin Lay Swe as Wai Wai
- Myint Pe as Shwe Ao
