= Nu Nu Nge Nge =

1970 Burmese Film

- Film poster
- Burmese: နုနုငယ်ငယ်
- Directed by: Tin Aung Myin Oo
- Screenplay by: Htun Lwin
- Story by: Htun Lwin
- Starring: Win Nyunt; Kyaw Hein; Kyi Kyi Htay; Sandar; Kyauk Lone
- Cinematography: Ko Kyi; Soe Khin
- Edited by: Tin Htun Naing; Khin Maung Win
- Music by: Ko Aung Ko
- Production company: Mawlamyine Films
- Release date: December 4, 1970
- Running time: 132 minutes
- Country: Myanmar
- Language: Burmese

Nu Nu Nge Nge (Burmese: နုနုငယ်ငယ်) is a 1970 Burmese black-and-white drama film, directed by Tin Aung Myin Oo starring Win Nyunt, Kyaw Hein, Kyi Kyi Htay, Sandar and Kyauk Lone.

== Cast ==
- Win Nyunt as U Kyaw Thet
- Kyaw Hein as Thet Htway
- Kyi Kyi Htay as Daw Htar Htar
- Sandar as Nu Nu
- Kyauk Lone as U Ba Thet
- Thar San as Hla Maung

== Award ==
Year	Award	Category	Nominee	Result
1970	Myanmar Motion Picture Academy Awards	Best Supporting Actress	Kyi Kyi Htay	Won
