= Kyee Yaung Saung Thaw Daung =

1985 Burmese Film

- Film Poster
- Burmese: ကျီးယောင်ဆောင်သောဒေါင်း
- Directed by: Myo Nyunt Thwin
- Screenplay by: Shwe Done Htun Lwin
- Based on: Kyee Yaung Saung Thaw Daung (Ko Pyar Laung comic) by Tin Aung Ni
- Starring: Kyaw Hein; Cho Pyone; Moht Moht Myint Aung
- Cinematography: Tin Win; Khin Thein; Than Shwe; Kyaw Tint
- Edited by: Daw Khin Yu; Tin Myint; Kyin Sein; Myo Myint
- Music by: Maung Ko Ko; The Rays
- Production company: Pyin Sa Yu Pa Films
- Release date: August 23, 1985
- Running time: 136 minutes
- Country: Myanmar
- Language: Burmese
- Box office: > 30 million Ks (currency of 1985), equivalent to > 4.9 million USD (2024)

Kyee Yaung Saung Thaw Daung (Burmese: ကျီးယောင်ဆောင်သောဒေါင်း; lit. A peacock pretending to be a crow) is a 1985 Burmese drama film, directed by Myo Nyunt Thwin starring Kyaw Hein, Cho Pyone and Moht Moht Myint Aung. Kyaw Hein acted in two character as a man (Pyar Laung) in main story and as a woman (Maung Missaka) in telling a story. The film grossed the currency of that era more than Ks.30 million. It was Kyaw Hein's most successful film.

== Plot ==
Pyar Laung is interested in Datu and thinks of himself as Natshinnaung in the story of Datu Kalyar and Natshinnaung. Because Datu's name is similar to Datu Kalyar. One day he met his friend Cho Yee. Her life was ruined by Khin Maung Zaw. She has a daughter by Khin Maung Zaw. Cho Yee did not care a daughter of Khin Maung Zaw, so Pya Laung told her about "Maung Missaka". It was a true story in life of Buddhahood. "Thaw Yay Ya Lu Lin, Maung Missaka was a young man who had become a woman because he had mistaken the Arhat "Shin Maha Kitsee" for being his wife. He had two children in man life and another two in woman life. His friend asked him which life he loves the children more, he replied that he loved the child more in a woman's life." Cho Yee understand a little bit. Pyar Laung confesses his love for Datu and fall in love. He told Datu that he was riding a rickshaw, but Datu did not believe him. One day, Datu was disappointed to see him riding a rickshaw. Pyar Laung met Datu and he said her that he told about his life before but datu did not accept. He tried to get married without loving Cho Yee. But, in the next day, she left her daughter in front of her husband Khin Maung Zaw house and fell to her death on her way back to her daughter. Finally, according to Pyar Laung's explanation, Khin Maung Zaw thought that his daughter's life would be ruined and repented and accepted her as his daughter. Datu understands the Pyar Laung and rekindles a love story.

== Cast ==
- Kyaw Hein as Pyar Laung. Maung Missaka in telling a true story
- Cho Pyone as Cho Yee
- Moht Moht Myint Aung as Datu
- Zaw Htoo as Khin Maung Zaw
- Lu Mone as Nay Myo
