= Bone Pyat Ba Maung =

1983 Burmese Film

- screenshot from film
- Burmese: ဘုံပြတ်ဘမောင်
- Directed by: Myat Tin Aye
- Screenplay by: Shin Lone
- Story by: Min Theinkha
- Starring: Collegian Ne Win; Kyaw Hein; Win Nyunt; San Shar Tin; Khin Thida Htun
- Cinematography: U Than Maung
- Edited by: Maung Maung Naing; Thein Swe; Phone Myint
- Music by: Maung Ko Ko
- Production company: Myanma Lutlatt Yay Films
- Release date: 1983
- Running time: 91 minutes
- Country: Myanmar
- Language: Burmese

Bone Pyat Ba Maung (Burmese: ဘုံပြတ်ဘမောင်) is a 1983 Burmese black-and-white drama film, directed by Myat Tin Aye starring Collegian Ne Win, Kyaw Hein, Win Nyunt, San Shar Tin and Khin Thida Htun.

== Cast ==
- Collegian Ne Win as Sapalin Hnin Maung
- Kyaw Hein as Ba Maung
- Win Nyunt as U Htin Kyaw
- San Shar Tin as Daw Khin Myo Tint
- Khin Thida Htun as Thin Thin
