= A Kar Ka A Chit A Hnit Ka Myittar =

1979 Burmese Film

- Film poster
- Burmese: အကာကအချစ်အနှစ်ကမေတ္တာ
- Directed by: Thukha
- Screenplay by: Thukha
- Based on: Ta Thet Lone Phone Tha Mhya Kone Kar Mha Paw by P Moe Nin
- Produced by: Daw Kyin Ti
- Starring: Collegian Ne Win; Kyaw Hein; Swe Zin Htaik
- Cinematography: U Than Maung; Aung Nan (Yananchaung)
- Edited by: Tin Gyi; Soe Moe Naing (Yaw)
- Music by: Maung Ko Ko
- Production company: San Pya Films
- Release date: November 28, 1979
- Running time: 111 minutes
- Country: Myanmar
- Language: Burmese

A Kar Ka A Chit A Hnit Ka Myittar (Burmese: အကာကအချစ်အနှစ်ကမေတ္တာ) is a 1979 Burmese black-and-white drama film, directed by Thukha starring Collegian Ne Win, Kyaw Hein and Swe Zin Htaik.

== Cast ==
- Collegian Ne Win as U Aww
- Kyaw Hein as Ba Tint
- Swe Zin Htaik as Khin Khin Nu
- Sein Khin as Daw Khin Sein
- San Ma Tu as U Kun Zaw

== Awards ==
Year	Award	Category	Nominee	Result
1979	Myanmar Motion Picture Academy Awards	Best Actor	Kyaw Hein	Won
1979	Myanmar Motion Picture Academy Awards	Best Supporting Actor	Collegian Ne Win	Won
1979	Myanmar Motion Picture Academy Awards	Best Supporting Actress	Sein Khin	Won
