= Par Par Lay =

Burmese comedian (1947–2013)

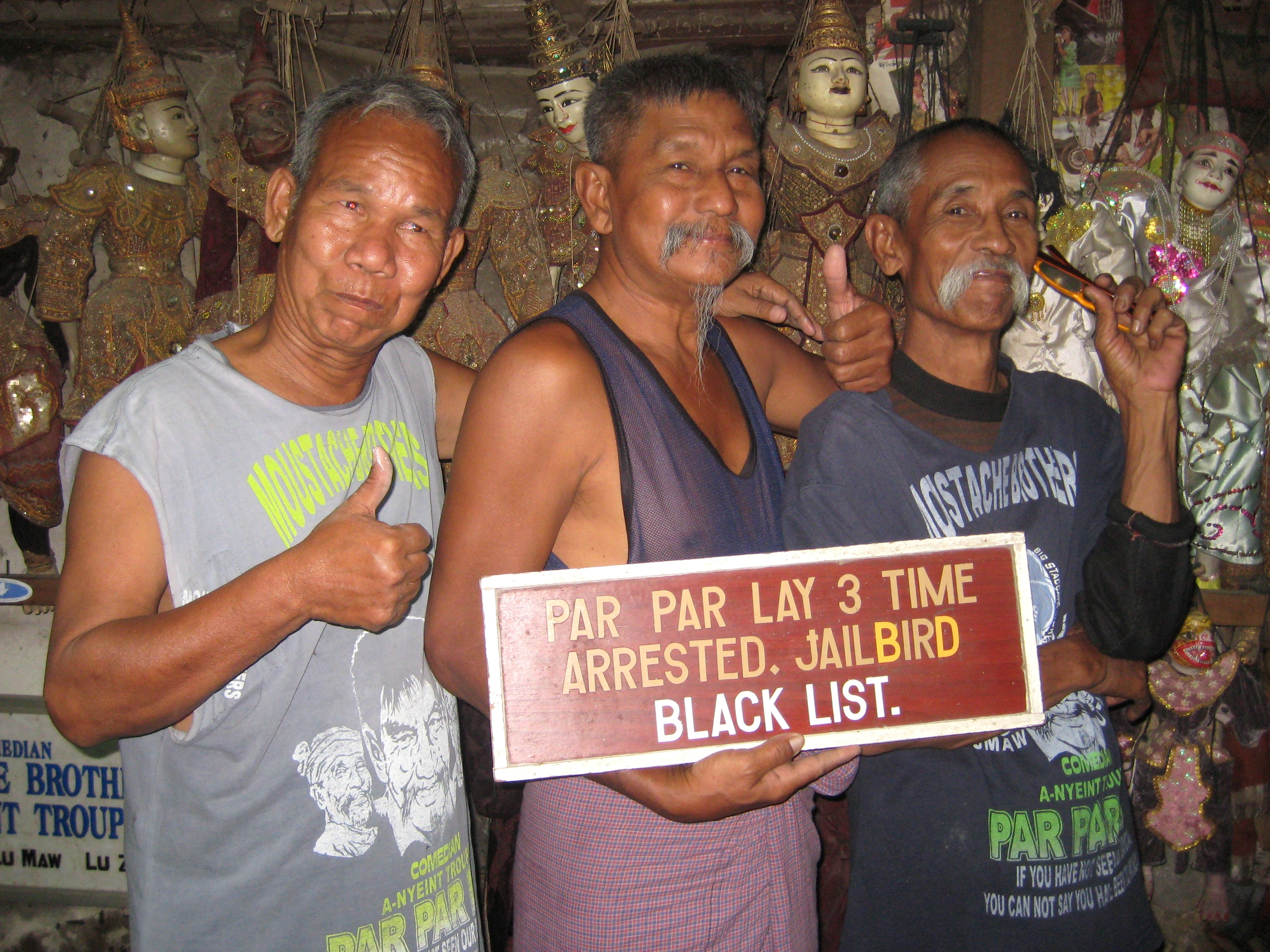
Par Par Lay (centre), with the other members of The Moustache Brothers, Lu Zaw (left) and Lu Maw (right).

Par Par Lay (1947 – 2 August 2013) was a Burmese comedian, satirist and entertainer. He formed the comedic troupe, The Moustache Brothers, with his younger brother, Lu Maw, and their cousin, Lu Zaw. A critic of the Burmese military regime, Par Par Lay often parodied the ruling generals and their government. He was arrested and imprisoned on three separate occasions by the military government.

Par Par Lay was born in a village near Shwebo, Burma, in 1947 to a family of traditional, travelling Burmese entertainers. His grandfather and father were Ah Nyeint performers, a form of Burmese entertainment where the participants mix satire, humor, dance and music. Par Par Lay began his career as an entertainer when he was fourteen years old.

In 1990, he was arrested for the first time and sentenced to six months in prison for campaigning during the run-up to the general election.

In 1996, Par Par Lay, Lu Zaw and two other entertainers traveled from their home in Mandalay to Aung San Suu Kyi's home in Yangon for an Independence Day celebration. All four achieved international attention when they were arrested in the middle of the night in Mandalay just three days later. The five men were held in custody for the next five years. Par Par Lay was imprisoned at Ching Krang Hka in the northern Kachin State. He was forced to smash rocks in the prison, but other prisoners agreed to break the rocks for him in return for performing for them.

Par Par Lay was arrested for the third time in 2007 for supporting the Saffron Revolution. He was jailed from September to November 2007.

Par Par Lay campaigned throughout Burma on behalf of Aung San Suu Kyi's National League for Democracy (NLD) during the 2012 Burmese parliamentary by-elections campaign. He urged supporters to have "no fear" during the election. The NLD won the by-elections by a wide landslide, taking 43 of the 44 contested seats.

Par Par Lay died from kidney disease in Mandalay on 2 August 2013, at the age of 67. He was survived by his wife, Ma Win Mar, younger brother, Lu Maw, and their cousin, Lu Zaw. Lu Maw and Lu Zaw will continue to perform as The Moustache Brothers as a duo. Their first performance without Par Par Lay was held four days after his funeral.
