= Nay Kyauk Khae =

1983 Burmese Film

- Film poster
- Burmese: နေကျောက်ခဲ
- Directed by: Thin Thin Yu
- Screenplay by: Nay Lin Htun
- Based on: Inlay Mhar Ywar Tae Moe (Comic) by Ko Ko Win
- Starring: Kyaw Hein; Swe Zin Htaik; Khin Thida Htun; Aung Lwin; Htun Htun Naing; Nwet Nwet San
- Cinematography: U Ba Swe; U Aye Ko
- Edited by: Daw Khin Yu; Tin Myint; Kyin Sein; Mya Than
- Music by: Maung Ko Ko
- Production company: Thitsar Oo Films
- Release date: 1983
- Running time: 113 minutes
- Country: Myanmar
- Language: Burmese

Nay Kyauk Khae (Burmese: နေကျောက်ခဲ) is a 1983 Burmese black-and-white drama film, directed by Thin Thin Yu starring Kyaw Hein, Swe Zin Htaik, Khin Thida Htun, Aung Lwin, Htun Htun Naing and Nwet Nwet San.

== Cast ==
- Kyaw Hein as Nay Kyauk Khae
- Swe Zin Htaik as Phyu Hnin
- Khin Thida Htun as Moe
- Aung Lwin as Dr. Min Kyaw
- Htun Htun Naing as Bo Bo
- Nwet Nwet San as Daw Nan Htay
