= Hsaung =

1966 Burmese Film

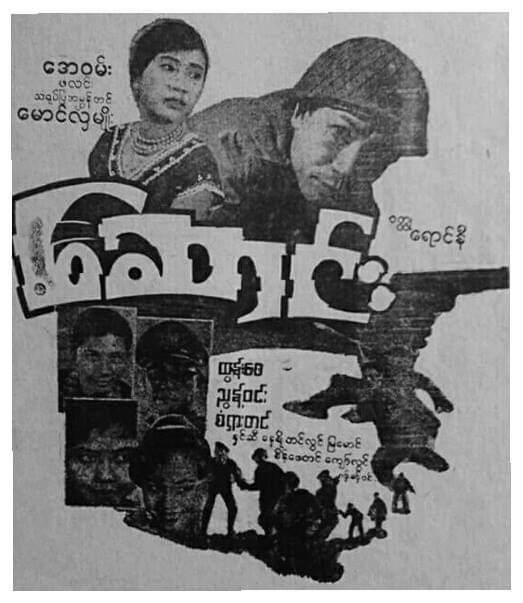
- film poster
- Burmese: ဆောင်း
- Directed by: Maung Hla Myo
- Screenplay by: Sein Phay Tin
- Based on: Hsaung by Yaung Ni
- Starring: Htun Wai; Nyunt Win; San Shar Tin; Hnin Si; San San Win
- Cinematography: U Chit Bwal; U Hla Maung; Phoe Htaung; San Myint
- Music by: A1 Khin Maung; Sandayar Chit Swe; Ko Ye Aung
- Production company: A1 Film Company
- Release date: 1966
- Running time: 175 minutes
- Country: Myanmar
- Language: Burmese

Hsaung (Burmese: ဆောင်း; lit. Winter) is a 1966 Burmese black-and-white drama film, directed by Maung Hla Myo starring Htun Wai, Nyunt Win, San Shar Tin, Hnin Si and San San Win.

== Cast ==
- Htun Wai as Kyaw Swar, Maung Maung Latt
- Nyunt Win as Htun Kyaw
- San Shar Tin as Naw Phaw Lu
- Hnin Si as Kyawt Yee
- San San Win as Yee Yee
- Gyan Sein as Daw Pu

== Awards ==
Year	Award	Category	Nominee	Result
1966	Myanmar Motion Picture Academy Awards	Best Picture	A1 Film Company	Won
1966	Myanmar Motion Picture Academy Awards	Best Actress	San Shar Tin	Won
