= The Moustache Brothers =

Burmese comedic trio

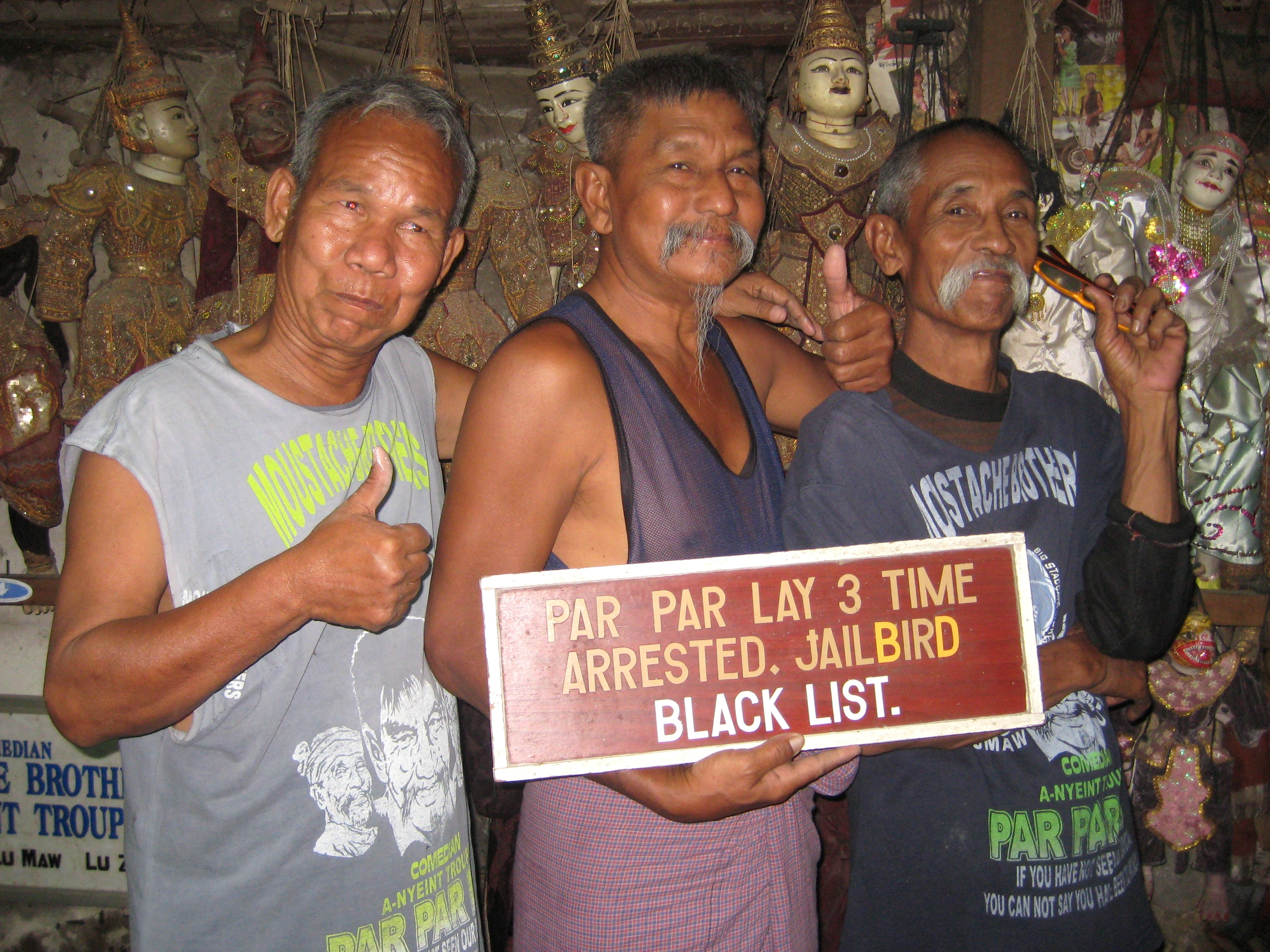
The Moustache Brothers in 2011. Lu Zaw (left), Par Par Lay (centre) and Lu Maw (right).

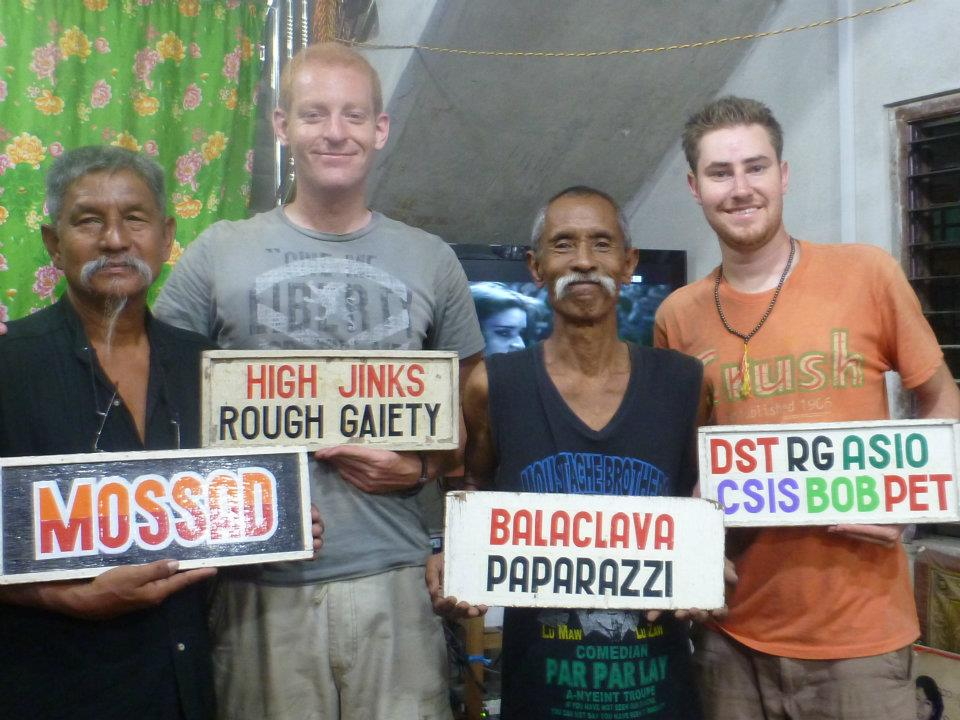
Two foreigners with The Moustache Brothers in Mandalay, Burma 2012

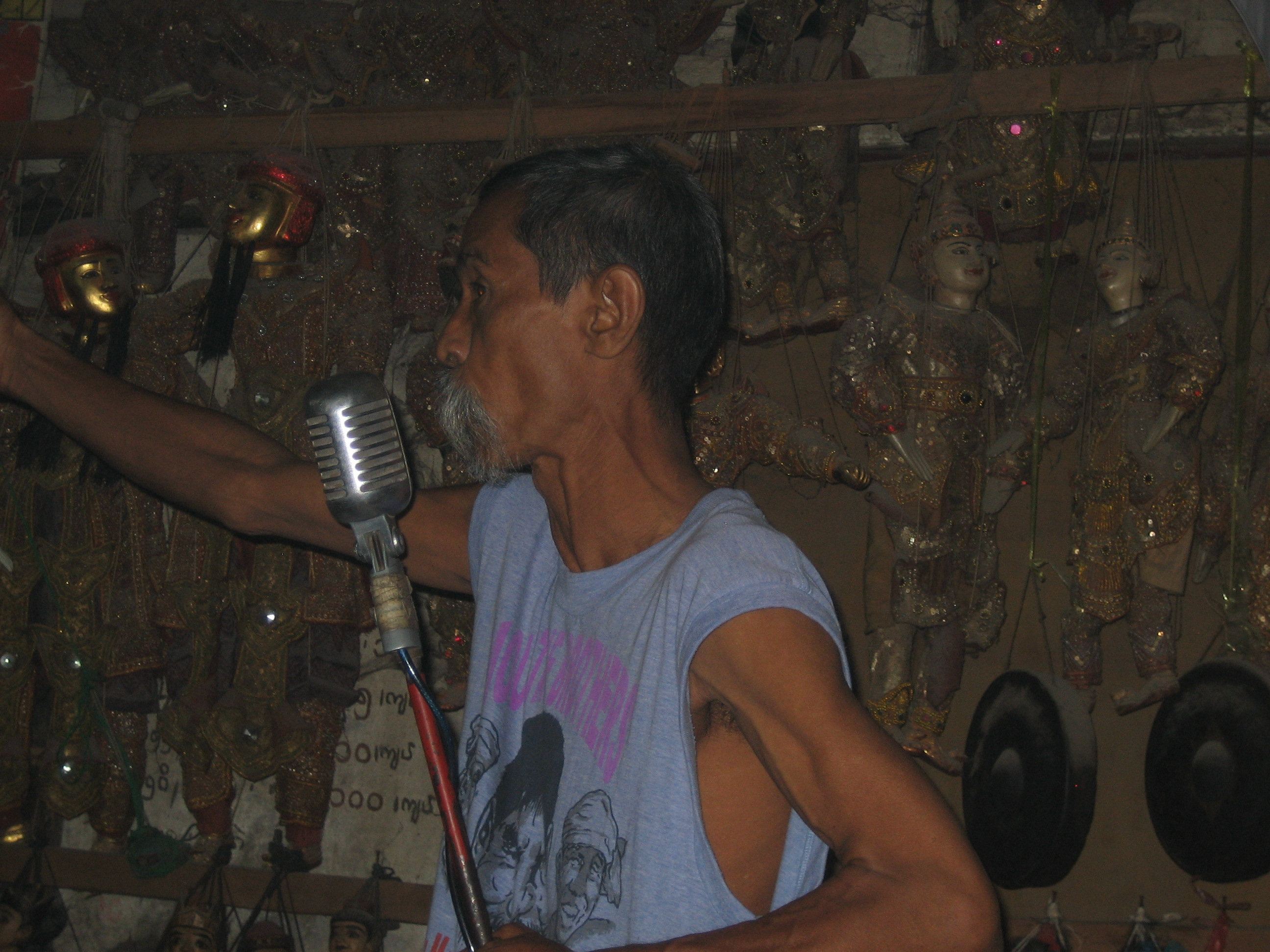
Lu Maw performing at home in Mandalay

The Moustache Brothers are a comedic trio from Mandalay, Burma known for live performances that combine screwball comedy, classic Burmese dance, and sharply satirical criticism of the totalitarian Burmese military regime.

The Moustache Brothers originally comprised U Par Par Lay, U Lu Zaw and U Lu Maw. Par Par Lay and Lu Maw were biological brothers, while the trio's third member, Lu Zaw, is their cousin.

Lay and Zaw served almost six years of a sentence to seven years in labour camp for criticizing the government in a performance at the home of Aung San Suu Kyi in Rangoon in 1996. Two National League for Democracy members who had arranged the performance were also arrested and served the same time. Amnesty International led a campaign for their release, and negotiations by Suu Kyi are suspected of having contributed to their release. As part of the conditions for their release and the fact that they were under house arrest regulations, they were allowed to perform only for foreigners, within the garage of their Mandalay house.

Par Par Lay was arrested on 25 September 2007 as part of the crackdown on the anti-government protests and held until 1 November.

In August 2013, Par Par Lay died from kidney disease, allegedly caused by the lead paint on the walls of a water tank that he drank from in prison. Lu Maw and Lu Zaw continue to perform as the Moustache Brothers as a duo. Their first public performance without Par Par Lay was held four days after his funeral.
