= Pann Pan Lyet Par =

1963 Burmese Film

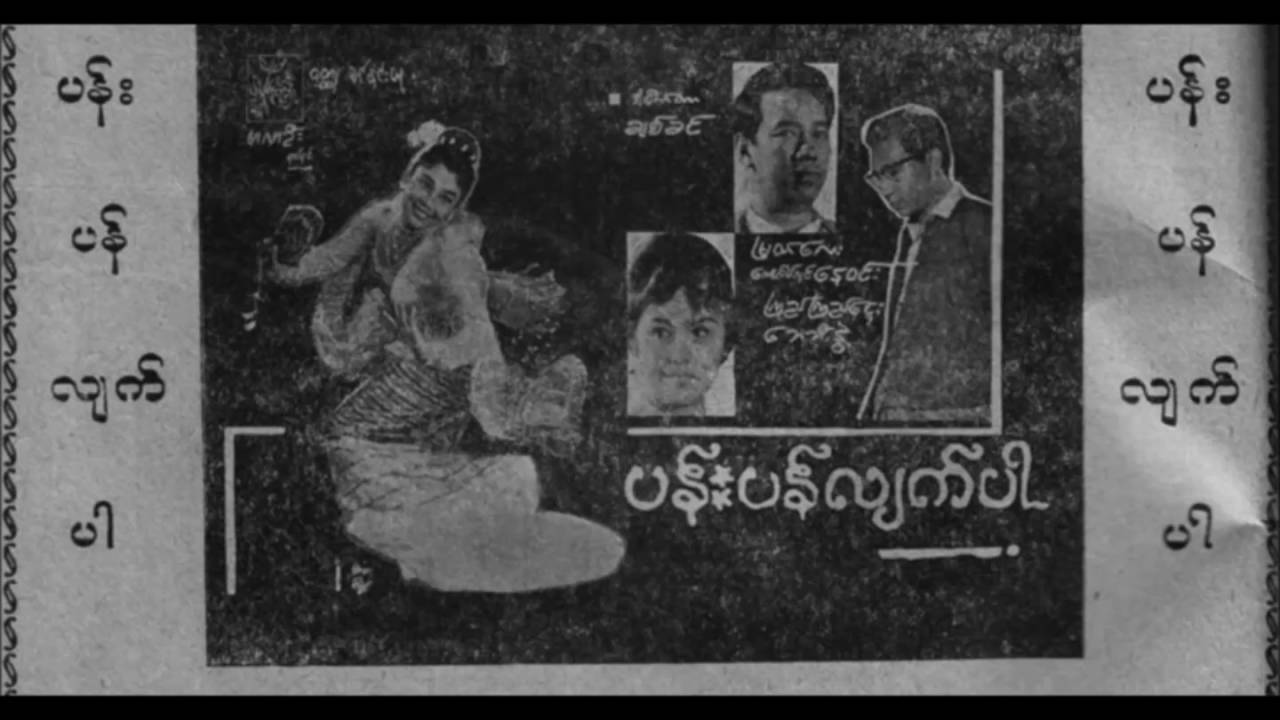
- Film poster
- Burmese: ပန်းပန်လျက်ပါ
- Directed by: Chit Khin
- Based on: Pann Pan Lyet Par by Khin Hnin Yu
- Starring: Collegian Ne Win; Myat Lay; Kyi Kyi Htay; Baby Nwet
- Cinematography: U Maung Lay; Thet Swe; Ba Than
- Edited by: Hla Shwe; Ko Lay
- Music by: Sandayar Chit Swe
- Production company: Marlar Oo Films
- Release date: November 1963
- Running time: 119 minutes
- Country: Myanmar
- Language: Burmese

Pann Pan Lyet Par (Burmese: ပန်းပန်လျက်ပါ) is a 1963 Burmese black-and-white drama film, directed by Chit Khin starring Collegian Ne Win, Myat Lay, Kyi Kyi Htay and Baby Nwet. It was based on the popular novel Pann Pan Lyet Par, written by Khin Hnin Yu.

== Cast ==
- Collegian Ne Win as Saw Htun
- Myat Lay as Kyaw Sein
- Kyi Kyi Htay as Ma Baydar
- Baby Nwet as Khin Ma Ma
