= Chit Thu Yway Mal Chit Wae Lal =

1975 Burmese film

- poster
- Burmese: ချစ်သူရွေးမယ်ချစ်ဝဲလယ်
- Directed by: Win Oo
- Screenplay by: Win Oo
- Produced by: Tin Oo; Tin Kyaing
- Starring: Win Oo; Sandar; Myint Myint Khin; Cho Pyone; Tin Tin Nwet; Myint Myint Khine; Nwet Nwet Mu; San San Aye
- Cinematography: Ba Kyi; Thein Aung
- Edited by: Khaing Myint Win; Maung Maung Lwin; Swe Sett
- Music by: Sandayar Hla Htut
- Production company: Sandar Film
- Release date: 1975
- Running time: 144 minutes
- Country: Myanmar
- Language: Burmese

Chit Thu Yway Mal Chit Wae Lal (Burmese: ချစ်သူရွေးမယ်ချစ်ဝဲလယ်) is a 1975 Burmese black-and-white drama film, directed by Win Oo starring Win Oo, Sandar, Myint Myint Khin, Cho Pyone, Tin Tin Nwet, Myint Myint Khine, Nwet Nwet Mu and San San Aye.

== Cast ==
- Win Oo as Win Oo, Win Htoo, Win Myuu, Win Naing, Win Khaing, Win Latt, Win Myat and their father (octuple role)
- Sandar as Sandar
- Myint Myint Khin as Myint Myint Khin
- Cho Pyone as Cho Pyone
- Tin Tin Nwet as Tin Tin Nwet
- Myint Myint Khine as Myint Myint Khine
- Nwet Nwet Mu as Nwet Nwet Mu
- San San Aye as San San Aye
