= Moht Moht Myint Aung =

Burmese actress

- မို့မို့မြင့်အောင်
- Born: Moht Moht Myint Aung; 25 May 1961 (age 65); Yangon, Burma
- Occupation: Actress
- Years active: 1979–present
- Spouse(s): Hlwan Moe (1980-1983)(divorced); Maung Maung Kyaw (1987–2022)(divorced)
- Parent(s): Myint Aung and Than Yin
- Awards: Myanmar Academy Award (1984, 1989, 1991, 1994, 2008)

Moht Moht Myint Aung (Burmese: မို့မို့မြင့်အောင် [mo̰ mo̰ mjɪ̰ɰ̃ àʊɰ̃], also Moh Moh Myint Aung) is a five-time Myanmar Academy Award winning Burmese film actress, best known for her leading lady roles in several Burmese films from the 1980s to the 2000s.

== Early life ==
Moht Moht Myint Aung was born in Yangon, the fifth child and youngest daughter of Myint Aung, a successful Burmese actor and director. She grew up in the Kyaukmyaung section of Tamwe Township. She wanted to be an actress like the leading ladies of the day like Wah Wah Win Shwe and Khin Than Nu. She attended high school at BEHS 1 Tamwe but failed the university matriculation exam several times. With most of her friends attending college, she gave up attending college and decided to focus on a film career.

== Career ==
Moht Moht Myint Aung was virtually unknown until Kyaw Hein, one of the top leading men of his era, chose her to star in one of his films, Mun-Tet-Chein-Mha Nay-Win-Thi (The Sun Sets at Noon), in 1979. She was still in 8th Standard at the time. After winning her first Academy Award for 1984, Mo Mo Myint Aung established herself as one of the leading actresses of Burmese cinema.

She is one of very few actresses in Burmese film history to lead a successful multi-decade career in a leading lady role. Mo Mo Myint Aung continues to appear in films in age appropriate roles. She won her latest Myanmar Academy Award for Best Actress in 2008.

=== Television ===
Moht Moht Myint Aung is on the judges panel in the show Myanmar's Got Talent, the Burmese franchise of the Got Talent series.

== Filmography ==
Moht Moht Myint Aung has made several movies over her over-three-decade-long career. She has won five Myanmar Academy Awards for both Best Actress and Best Supporting Actress categories.

=== Film (Cinema) ===
- Moon Tae Chain Twin Nay Win The (1982)
- Myo Pya Hna Lone Thar (1984)
- Kyee Yaung Saung Thaw Daung (1985)
- Khat Sein Sein Nay Pa Mal (1989)
- Thamee Nae A May Myar (1991)
- Ma Thudamasari (1994)
- Eain Met Yar Thi (2001)
- Ma Nyein Thaw Mee (2002)
- Myint Mo Htet Ka Tharaphu (2008)

=== TV series ===
- Forever Mandalay (2014)
- Kyee Myat Thaw Martar (2018)
- The Beloved (2023)
- Sparkle Hearts (2023)

== TV show ==
- Myanmar's Got Talent

== Awards and nominations ==
Year	Award	Category	Film	Result
1984	Myanmar Academy Award	Best Supporting Actress	City Of Heart	Won
1989	Myanmar Academy Award	Best Actress	Behave Like Strangers	Won
1991	Myanmar Academy Award	Best Actress	Daughter and Mothers	Won
1994	Myanmar Academy Award	Best Actress	Ma Thudamasari	Won
2002	Myanmar Academy Award	Best Actress	Ma Nyein Thaw Mee	Nominated
2008	Myanmar Academy Award	Best Actress	Crown Atop Mount "Myint Moh"	Won
