= Ma Thudamasari =

1982 novel by Moe Moe (Inya)

- Book Cover
- Author: Moe Moe (Inya)
- Original title: မသုဓမ္မစာရီ
- Language: Burmese
- Release number: 2
- Genre: Social; Realist
- Publisher: Inya Sarpay
- Publication date: February 1982 (first edition); December 1999 (second edition)
- Publication place: Burma
- Pages: 265 (second edition)

Ma Thudamasari (also spelt Ma Sudhammacārī; Burmese: မသုဓမ္မစာရီ) is a social realist novel written by Burmese author Moe Moe (Inya). Having been adapted for the 1994 film of the same name, the novel follows Thein Mya, a young Burmese woman who abandoned the human society and became a Buddhist nun. The book was first published in Burma in February 1982 by Inya Sarpay. Its second edition was published in December 1999.

== Synopsis ==
=== Main characters ===
- Thein Mya aka Ma Thudamasari is the novel's protagonist.
- Ngwe Hmone is Thein Mya's mother whose storyline depicts a quarter of the novel.
- Thaung Pe is Ngwe Hmone's third husband and is Thein Mya's uncle.
- Hla Khaing is Thein Mya's husband.
- Shwe Hmone is Ngwe Hmone's elder sister i.e. Thein Mya's aunt.
- Htwe Sein is Thein Mya's best friend.
- Sein Thaung is son of Thaung Pe and Ngwe Hmone.

== Legacy ==
=== Film version ===
Based on the novel, Kyi Soe Tun's film Ma Thudamasari was released in 1994. Starring by Moht Moht Myint Aung as Ma Thudamasari, the film won the academy awards in two categories: Best Actress and Best Cinematography.
