= Sakawma =

1959 Burmese Film

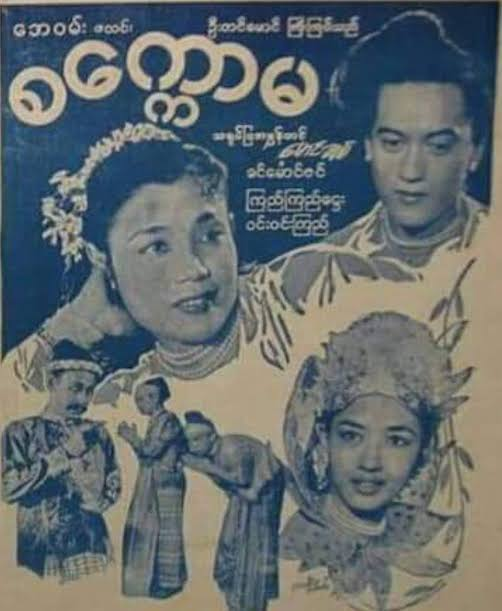
- Film poster
- Burmese: စက္ကောမ
- Directed by: Maung Chit
- Screenplay by: Dagon U San Ngwe
- Starring: Khin Maung Zin; Kyi Kyi Htay; Aye Ngwe Gyi
- Production company: A1 Film Company
- Release date: 1959
- Running time: 107 minutes
- Country: Myanmar
- Language: Burmese

Sakawma (Burmese: စက္ကောမ) is a 1959 Burmese black-and-white drama film, directed by Maung Chit starring Khin Maung Zin, Kyi Kyi Htay and Aye Ngwe Gyi.

== Cast ==
- Aye Ngwe Gyi as The King
- Khin Maung Zin as The Prince
- Kyi Kyi Htay as The Princess (Wunna Sandi)
