= Sein Nae Tay Zar =

1983 Burmese Film

- Film poster
- Burmese: စိမ်းနဲ့တေဇာ
- Directed by: Myo Myint Aung
- Screenplay by: Nay Lin Htun
- Based on: Maung Ma Ma Nyein by Aung Lin
- Starring: Kyaw Hein; San Shar Tin; Swe Zin Htaik
- Cinematography: Chit Min Lu; Naing Nu Shein
- Edited by: Tin Nyein; Kyaw Htun
- Production company: Pyi Kyaw Films
- Release date: 1983
- Running time: 99 minutes
- Country: Myanmar
- Language: Burmese

Sein Nae Tay Zar (Burmese: စိမ်းနဲ့တေဇာ) is a 1983 Burmese black-and-white drama film, directed by Myo Myint Aung starring Kyaw Hein, San Shar Tin and Swe Zin Htaik. The film is a sequel to Tay Zar.

== Cast ==
- Kyaw Hein as Tay Zar
- Swe Zin Htaik as Sein
- San Shar Tin as Daw Tin Tin
- May Nwet as Daw Htway
- Myint Naing as Ba Kyi
- Eant Kyaw as Yin Maung
- Zaw Htoo as Soe Tint
- Khin Nu Nu as Mya Yee
- Kay Thwe Moe as Too Mar
- Phyu Mar as Pu Sue Ma
- Han Saw as Nga Soe Lay

== Award ==
Year	Award	Category	Nominee	Result
1983	Myanmar Motion Picture Academy Awards	Best Supporting Actress	San Shar Tin	Won
