= Yar Zar Nay Win =

Burmese film actor and singer (born 1968)

- ရာဇာနေဝင်း
- Born: Yar Zar Nay Win; 1968 (age 57–58); Rangoon, Burma
- Occupations: film actor, singer
- Years active: 1990s – present
- Parents: Kawleikgyin Ne Win; Khin Marla

Yar Zar Nay Win (Burmese: ရာဇာနေဝင်း; pronounced [jàzà nè wɪ́ɰ̃]; also spelt Yaza Ne Win, born 1968) is a Burmese film actor and singer. He was one of the most successful leading men of Burmese cinema during the first half of the 2000s.

Ne Win comes from a well known artistic family. He is the son of Kawleikgyin Ne Win, a two-time Myanmar Academy Award winner, the elder brother of famous singer Hayma Ne Win and a first cousin of Eindra Kyaw Zin, one of the most successful models and leading ladies of Burmese cinema. His maternal grandfather was Bo Zeya, one of the Thirty Comrades that founded the modern Burmese Army in 1941.
