= Moe Moe (Inya) =

Burmese writer

- မိုးမိုး အင်းလျား
- Born: 24 October 1944; Daik-U, Bago Region, Myanmar
- Died: 13 March 1990 (aged 45); Yangon, Myanmar
- Education: Yangon University (B.Sc)
- Occupations: Writer, novelist
- Spouse: Myo Nyunt
- Writing career
- Notable awards: Myanmar National Literature Award (1974, 1980, 1982, 1986)

Moe Moe (Burmese: မိုးမိုး, 24 October 1944 – 13 March 1990) was a Burmese writer and novelist. She is considered one of the most influential Burmese women writers and won the Myanmar National Literature Award four times. She wrote 101 short stories and serial novels, 24 full-length novels, and 55 articles.

== Early life and education ==
Moe Moe (Inya) was born in Daik-U, Bago Region, Myanmar on 24 October 1944. Her father was Biritsh U Tun and her mother was Daw Mya Shin. She graduated with a B.S. in Math from Yangon University. She married a publisher and settled in Rangoon.

== Career ==
Under her pen name Inya, she began writing poems while attending Yangon University in 1964. In 1972, she wrote her first novel, Pyauk-thaw-lann-hmar san-ta-war, which received the National Literature Award in 1974. In 1980, 1982 and 1986, she received the National Literature Award for her short stories and anthologies. From 1989 to until the period before her death, she worked as the editor of Sabel Phyu Magazine.

Moe Moe was a key figure in the realism movement, writing about the experiences of Burmese women from common circumstances. She wrote about the difficulties of young rural women acclimating to urban areas and women whose husbands were unfaithful.

== Published works ==
- Kywaymalo Nat Way Waymalo Nat Kyway (ကြွေမလိုနဲ့ဝေ ဝေမလိုနဲ့ကြွေ) - 1981
- Joe (ဂျိုး)- 1980
- Ngapali Zat Lann (ငပလီဇာတ်လမ်း) - 1976
- Nyein ko Shet Par (ငြိမ်းကိုရှက်ပါ)- 1981
- Nyimalay Ka Achitko Koekwaethatetlar (ညီမလေးက အချစ်ကို ကိုးကွယ်သတဲ့လား) - 1981
- Pyautethaw Lan Mhar Santawar (ပျောက်သောလမ်းမှာ စမ်းတဝါး; Bewildering on the Lost Road) - 1974
- Ma Thudamasari (1982)

=== Novels made into film ===
- Achit Sothaw Ayar (အချစ်ဆိုသောအရာ) 1976
- Mhataparr Acharmashi Pyi (မှတစ်ပါး အခြားမရှိပြီ) 1987
- Ma Thudamasari, 1994 film adaptation of Ma Thudamasari

== Death ==
She died in Yangon on 13 March 1990. (At the age of 46) At the time of her death, she was outlived by her husband, Myo Nyunt (also a literary figure), her two sons, and one daughter.
