= Collegian Ne Win =

Burmese actor and director (1928–1983)

- ကောလိပ်ဂျင်နေဝင်း
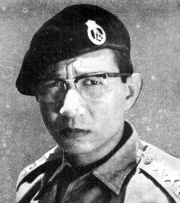
- Born: Ne Win; 1 October 1928; Hinthada, British Burma
- Died: 2 June 1983 (aged 54); Rangoon, Burma
- Occupations: actor, director
- Years active: 1959–1983
- Spouse: Khin Marla
- Children: Thandar Ne Win; Yaza Ne Win; Hayma Ne Win; Yupar Ne Win
- Parent(s): U Thet Pe, Daw Tin
- Awards: Burmese Academy Award; Payin Yaung 1969; Aka-Ga A-Chit Anhit-Ga Myitta 1979

Collegian Ne Win (Burmese: ကောလိပ်ဂျင်နေဝင်း, pronounced [kɔ̀lèdʑɪ̀ɰ̃ nè wɪ́ɰ̃]; 1 October 1928 – 2 June 1983) was a two-time Burmese Academy Award winning Burmese film actor and director.

== Early life ==
Ne Win was born in Hinthada (Henzada), Ayeyarwady Division, the son of Daw Tin, a teacher, and U Thet Pe, a police officer. Born Ne Win, he was given his famous moniker after his successful debut film, Kawleikgyin (The Collegian), so as not to be confused with the late Burmese dictator with the same name, Gen. Ne Win. After graduating from Coming High School in Hinthada, Ne Win enlisted in the Burmese Navy in 1946. He left the navy in 1951 to enroll in Rangoon University. At the university, Ne Win played for the Rangoon University football team as a striker forward. Ne Win proved a talented footballer. He played for the Burmese national team in 1955 and won the Best Player award given by the Burma Football Federation in 1956. Ne Win earned a Bachelor of Arts degree in 1958.

== Career ==
Ne Win made his film debut in 1959 with Kawleikgyin. Director Chinn Sein cast Ne Win, a nationally well-known footballer, to play as the main character in the film about a love story between a beautiful girl and a carefree Rangoon University athlete. The film's immense popularity instantly made Ne Win to become of the most influential actor in the Burmese entertainment industry. Known as Kawliekgyin Ne Win from then on, remained as one of the leading actors till 1960s, starring in dozens of films.

Starting in the late 1960s, Kawleikgyin Ne Win successfully switched into older, father-figure roles. He won his two Burmese Academy Awards late in his career in 1969 and 1979.

== His family ==
Kawleikgyin Ne Win was married to Khin Marla, daughter of the late Bo Zeya, a member of the legendary Thirty Comrades and military leader of the Communist Party of Burma. He has 4 children. His only son and his second youngest daughter are both successful artists in their own right. His son Yaza Ne Win is a comedic actor and singer, and was popular in the late 1990s and early 2000s. The daughter Hayma Ne Win is one of the most successful Burmese singers, popular during the late 1980s and 1990s. His eldest daughter Thandar Ne Win has her own business firm and owns hotels. His youngest daughter, Yupar Ne Win who got married and settled in America. Kawleikgyin Ne Win never witnessed his children's professional success which came after his death in 1983.

== Filmography ==
- The Collegian (1959)
- Pann Pan Lyet Par (1963)
- Maung Mu Paing Shin (1964)
- Pa Yin Yaung (The Colour Amber) (1969)
- Kanyar Pyo Nae Zayar Ao (1972)
- A Kar Ka A Chit A Hnit Ka Myittar (The Shell Is Love; The Yoke Is Loving Kindness (metta)) (1979)
- Ta Oo Ka Saytanar Ta Oo Ka Myittar (1976)
- Mahuyar (1976)
- Lu Zaw (1978)
- Tay Zar (1981)
- Pyin Ma Ngote To (1981)
- Sein Nae Tay Zar (1983)
- Bone Pyat Ba Maung (1983)
- Chit Tae Yet Ko Kyo Nay Mal (1983)
- Htar Tha-Khin
- Moane
- Kyauk-Baloo & Pa Pa Win
- Arr Nwe Thu Par Shin
- Ma-Moane Lay Ne` Ngapali
- Ma-Hu-Yar
- Hninn-Si-Nee Ein-Met
- Seik Say-tha-Teik
- Myay Hmar Pwint Thaw Myitta Pann
