= Tay Zar =

1981 Burmese Film

- Film poster
- Burmese: တေဇာ
- Directed by: Myo Myint Aung
- Screenplay by: Nay Lin Htun
- Based on: Baydar by Aung Lin
- Starring: Collegian Ne Win; Kyaw Hein; San Shar Tin; Swe Zin Htaik
- Music by: Maung Ko Ko
- Production company: Pyi Taw Aye Films
- Release date: 1981
- Running time: 104 minutes
- Country: Myanmar
- Language: Burmese

Tay Zar (Burmese: တေဇာ) is a 1981 Burmese black-and-white drama film, directed by Myo Myint Aung starring Collegian Ne Win, Kyaw Hein, San Shar Tin and Swe Zin Htaik.

== Cast ==
- Collegian Ne Win as U Pe Win
- Kyaw Hein as Tay Zar
- San Shar Tin as Daw Tin Tin
- Swe Zin Htaik as Sein
- May Nwet as Daw Htway
- Khin Nu Nu as Mya Yee
- Myo Myo Soe as Too Mar
- Eant Kyaw as Yin Maung
- Kyaw Gyi as Soe Tint
- Htet Htet Khaing as Pu Sue Ma
- Min Latt as Nga Soe Lay
