= Chit Thet Wai =

1952 Burmese Film

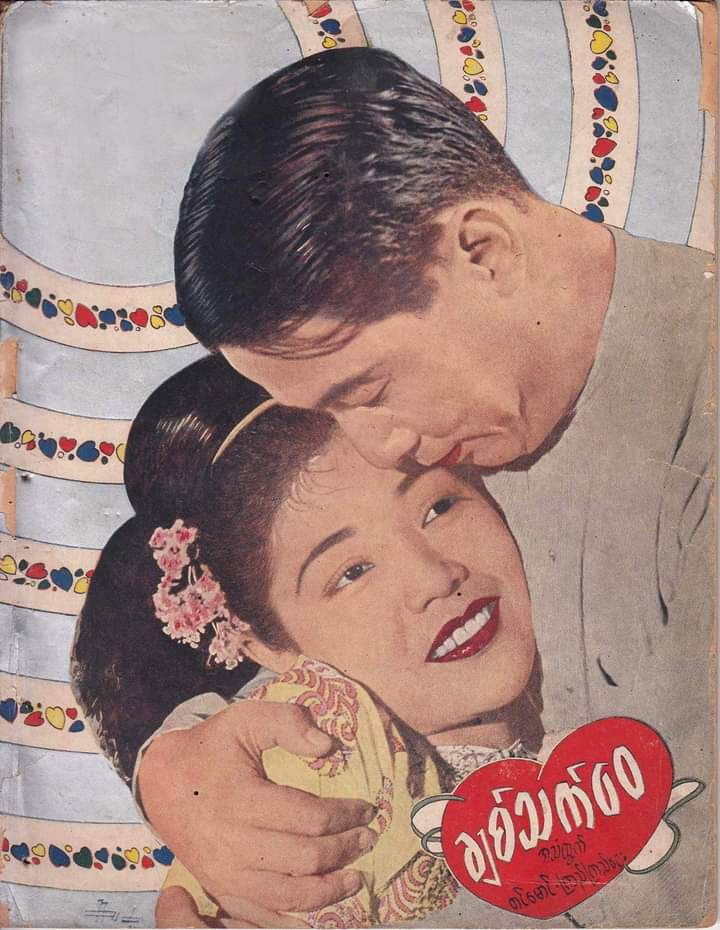
- Film poster
- Burmese: ချစ်သက်ဝေ
- Directed by: Tin Maung
- Starring: Tin Maung; Kyi Kyi Htay; Thein Zaw; May Lwin
- Cinematography: Hla Maung; Chit Phwal
- Music by: Shwe Pyi Aye; Myoma Nyein; Saya Nhyar; Saw Nyein
- Production company: A1 Film Company
- Release date: September 1, 1952
- Running time: 163 minutes
- Country: Myanmar
- Language: Burmese

Chit Thet Wai (Burmese: ချစ်သက်ဝေ) is a 1952 Burmese black-and-white romantic-drama film, directed by Tin Maung starring Tin Maung, Kyi Kyi Htay, Thein Zaw and May Lwin.

== Cast ==
- Tin Maung as Tin Aung
- Kyi Kyi Htay as May Khin
- Thein Zaw as May Aung
- May Lwin as Khin May Lwin
- Thar Gaung as Thar Gaung
- Ba Thit as Ba Thit

== Awards ==
Year	Award	Category	Nominee	Result
1952	Myanmar Motion Picture Academy Awards	Best Picture	A1 Film Company	Won
1952	Myanmar Motion Picture Academy Awards	Best Actress	Kyi Kyi Htay	Won
