= San Shar Tin =

Burmese actress and anyeint dancer

- စံရှားတင်
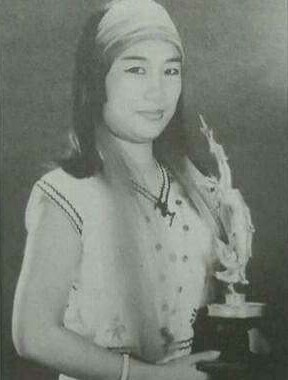
- Born: November 11, 1934 (age 91); Katha, British Burma
- Occupations: Actress, anyeint dancer
- Years active: 1957 – 1998
- Spouse: Tekkatho Htun Naung ( Dr. Htun Naung)
- Parent(s): U Chone M (father); Daw Nhyar (mother)
- Awards: Myanmar Motion Picture Academy Awards (Best Actress Award for 1966, Best Supporting Actress Award for 1983); Sithu Title (2012)

San Shar Tin (Burmese: စံရှားတင်; born 11 November 1934) is a Burmese actress and anyeint dancer. She won Best Actress Award for 1966 and Best Supporting Actress Award for 1983 in Myanmar Motion Picture Academy Awards.

== Early life ==
San Shar Tin was born on 11 November 1934 to parents, U Chone M and Daw Nhyar in Moetar Village, Katha, Sagaing Region, British Burma. She is youngest of seven siblings. She attended education until Grade 7.

== Career ==
At the age of 18, she performed as Anyeint dancer with Shwe Man Tin Maung at the Shwe Nan Tin Zat Pwe. After three years performed in the Shwe Man Thabin, she took a break for a year. Then she contacted director Shwe Done Bi Aung and planned to make a Yamet film, but it did not happen. She starred both in "Hsu" and "Chit Hmone Tine" films. Hsu film took a long time to make, so Chit Hmone Tine film premiered first. So her first film was Chit Hmone Tine. Then she starred in above 100 films.

Popular film of San Shar Tin were Maung Maung Hnint Theingi, Lu Hla Hnint Yu Pa, Kanyar Pyo Nae Zayar Ao, Shwe Lu Wun Hnint Kyun Nyo Shin, Thu, Chit Taw Chit Tal, Bar Lo Lo, Ko Lo Chin Thaw Pan, Yin Mhar Pyo Thaw Pan, Htawara Myittar, Wunna Theingi, Kayah Thazin Pwint Lay Hlyin, Phyit Lay Yar Bawa Kwal, Myay, Myittar Hu The, Ngo Thar Ngo Ma So Tae Myet Yay, Thet Htar Shwe Wah, Mone Tine Sae Thaw Lae, Pyone Pyone Shwin Shwin Chit Pyi Yin Lae Chit Mal, A Tway, Hsaung, San Eain Ko Sein Nae Moon Mal, Chit Thet Kaday Kadar and Sein Nae Tay Zar.

She won Best Actress Award in 1966 Myanmar Motion Picture Academy Awards for Hsaung film. She also won Best Supporting Actress Award in 1983 Myanmar Motion Picture Academy Awards for Sein Nae Tay Zar film.

She starred in 1986 film Thamee Thamet Kamee Kamet. Then, she starred in 1997 film Never Shall We Be Enslaved as the character Hsinbyumashin.

== Filmography ==
- A Tway (1962)
- Hsaung (1966)
- Phoo Sar Lan Sone (1969)
- Kanyar Pyo Nae Zayar Ao (1972)
- Mahuyar (1976)
- Tay Zar (1981)
- Sein Nae Tay Zar (1983)
- Bone Pyat Ba Maung (1983)
- Chit Tae Yet Ko Kyo Nay Mal (1983)
- Never Shall We Be Enslaved (1997)

== Personal life ==
She is married to Tekkatho Htun Naung.
