= A Phay Ta Khu Thar Ta Khu =

1977 Burmese Film

- Film poster
- Burmese: အဖေတစ်ခုသားတစ်ခု
- Directed by: Maung Nanda
- Screenplay by: Man Aung Kyi
- Story by: Maung Lu Din
- Starring: Sein Myint; Zaw Lin; Swe Zin Htaik; Thida Khin Htwe; Aung Htun Lay
- Edited by: Daw Phwar Thant; Daw Khin Yu; Tin Myint; Myint Khine
- Music by: Maung Ko Ko
- Production company: New Burma Films
- Release date: 1977
- Running time: 119 minutes
- Country: Myanmar
- Language: Burmese

A Phay Ta Khu Thar Ta Khu (Burmese: အဖေတစ်ခုသားတစ်ခု) is a 1977 Burmese black-and-white drama film, directed by Maung Nanda starring Sein Myint, Zaw Lin, Swe Zin Htaik, Thida Khin Htwe and Aung Htun Lay.

== Cast ==
- Sein Myint as Chan Thar
- Zaw Lin as Kyaw Zay Ya
- Swe Zin Htaik as Mi Moe
- Thida Khin Htwe as Daw Htwe Nge
- Myint Pe as San Htoo
- Aung Htun Lay as Kan Kaung

== Awards ==
Year	Award	Category	Nominee	Result
1977	Myanmar Motion Picture Academy Awards	Best Actor	Sein Myint	Won
1977	Myanmar Motion Picture Academy Awards	Special Award (Child Actor)	Aung Htun Lay	Won
