= Lwan Nay Mal Ma Ma =

1986 Burmese Film

- Film Poster
- Burmese: လွမ်းနေမယ်မမ
- Directed by: U Tin Yu
- Screenplay by: Maung Ni Lwin
- Based on: A Lal Ka Lu Sakar Wae Ei by Nwam Jar Thaing
- Starring: Kyaw Hein; Cho Pyone; Swe Zin Htaik
- Cinematography: Chit Min Lu
- Edited by: Maung Thitsar; Maung Maung Kyaw Htun
- Production company: Mya Nandar Films
- Release date: 1986
- Running time: 110 minutes
- Country: Myanmar
- Language: Burmese

Lwan Nay Mal Ma Ma (Burmese: လွမ်းနေမယ်မမ) is a 1986 Burmese musical-drama film, directed by U Tin Yu starring Kyaw Hein, Cho Pyone and Swe Zin Htaik. It was based on the popular novel "A Lal Ka Lu Sakar Wae Ei", written by Nwam Jar Thaing.

== Cast ==
- Kyaw Hein as Yan Naing
- Cho Pyone as Aye Ma Ma
- Swe Zin Htaik as Nwe Mon
- Zaw Htoo as Maw Si
- May Thit as Mother of Yan Naing
- Myint Naing as Saw Oo
- Eant Kyaw
