= Mone Par Tal Maung Ko =

1973 Burmese film

- poster
- Burmese: မုန်းပါတယ်မောင့်ကို
- Directed by: Tin Htun Naing
- Screenplay by: Win Oo
- Story by: Win Oo
- Starring: Win Oo; Myint Myint Khin; Phoe Par Gyi; Aung Lwin
- Edited by: Khaing Myint Win; Swe Sett
- Music by: A1 Soe Myint; Shwe Pyi Aye; Sandayar Hla Htut
- Production company: Sandar Film
- Release date: 1973
- Running time: 134 minutes
- Country: Myanmar
- Language: Burmese

Mone Par Tal Maung Ko (Burmese: မုန်းပါတယ်မောင့်ကို) is a 1973 Burmese black-and-white drama film, directed by Tin Htun Naing starring Win Oo, Myint Myint Khin, Phoe Par Gyi and Aung Lwin. Myint Myint Khin won the Best Actress Award in 1973 Myanmar Motion Picture Academy Awards for this film.

== Cast ==
- Win Oo as Win Oo
- Myint Myint Khin as Myint Myint May
- Phoe Par Gyi as U Kan Gyi
- Aung Lwin as Aung Lwin
