= Hay Mar Nay Win =

Burmese singer

Hay Mar Nay Win ဟေမာနေဝင်း
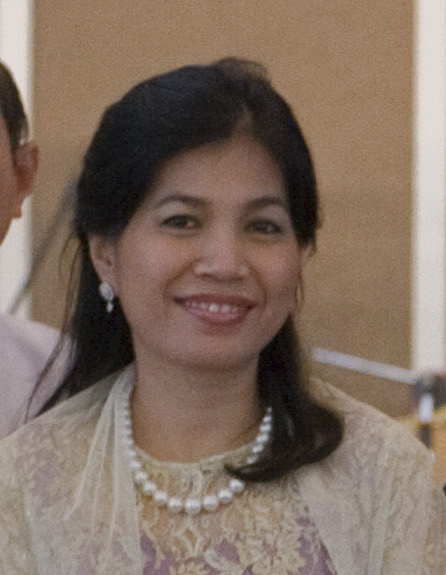
- Hay Mar Nay Win in 2010

Background information
- Born: Hay Mar Nay Win; Yangon, Myanmar
- Genres: Burmese pop
- Occupation: Singer
- Years active: 1980s–present

Hay Mar Nay Win (Burmese: ဟေမာနေဝင်း, pronounced [hèmà nè wɪ́ɰ̃]; commonly spelt Hayma Ne Win) is a Burmese singer who was popular during the late 1980s and early 1990s. She is considered one of the most successful singers of her generation, releasing over 25 albums since her debut. She began her singing career by making appearances on stage shows with Thein Tan's band LPJ, eventually singing songs written by Kaiser and Thukhamein Hlaing, such as "Butterfly" (လိပ်ပြာ) and "Where Does Love Start?" (အချစ်ကဘယ်ကစ).

== Early life ==
Hay Mar comes from a well known artistic family. She is the daughter of two-time Myanmar Academy Award winning Kawleikgyin Ne Win, and the younger sister of actor Yar Zar Nay Win and a first cousin of Eaindra Kyaw Zin, an actress and model. Her maternal grandfather was Bo Zeya, one of the Thirty Comrades that founded the modern Burmese Army in 1941. Additionally, her uncle was Dagon Taryar, a renowned writer, who taught Hay Mar singing while he played the piano.

Growing up, she had always had an interest in music, singing songs that her father would play on the piano. Her father did not support her music career, and he died before he could see Hay Mar's great success.

== Career ==
Her father was friends with Myanmar Pyi Thein Tan, from the LPJ band and prominent singer in the 1970s-1980s. He saw her talent and offered to help create her first album, Chit Lu Soe. Throughout her career, her main supporters were her aunt Daw Ni and uncle Dagon Taryar. The success of her song Yone Lar broadcast on MRTV in 1985 was the main start of her popularity among audiences. However, she moved to the United States (Los Angeles) in July 1988 and had a short break in her career. Before leaving the country, she prerecorded two albums: Khwint Hlut Naw (released in August 1988) and Pyan Yaw Pay (released in December 1988.) After the tremendous success of her 1990 album Poe Hpa Lan where her vocals were recorded in the United States, she returned to Myanmar in 1991 to continue making music and continued to see more success. During this time period, she also released numerous Myanmar genre songs.

In 2004, she had a 2-hour live show of her biggest hits featuring both younger and older singers. This was one of her bestselling albums, released through both VCD Karaoke and CD.

== Album discography ==
Hay Mar Nay Win released mostly Western cover albums in the mid-1980s-early 1990s. After this period, she released more Myanmar genre songs. The following is a partial list of her albums.

=== Solo albums ===
- Chit Lu Soe ချစ်လူဆိုး (July 1985)
- Thamin Lae Pyan သမင်လည်ပြန် (1986)
- Min Kyaunt မင်းကြောင့် (May 1986)
- Hay Mar Nay Win Hnit Yaut ဟေမာနေဝင်းနှစ်ယောက် (August 1986)
- Pa Hta Ma Yee Sar ပထမရည်းစား (1987)
- Ma Pyaw Ma Shi Nae Naw မပြောမရှိနဲ့နော် (March 1987)
- Gyo Tu Tha Din ဂြိုဟ်တုသတင်း (November 1987)
- Khwint Hlut Naw ခွင့်လွှတ်နော် (August 1988)
- Pyan Yaw Pay ပြန်လျော်ပေး (December 1988)
- Poe Hpa Lan ပိုးဖလံ (November 1990)
- Chit Pya Mal ချစ်ပြမယ် (November 1991)
- Saung Gadibar ဆောင်းကတ္တီပါ (1992)
- Pyaing Pwel Kyee ပြိုင်ပွဲကြီး (June 1992)
- Eain A Pyan အိမ်အပြန် (October 1992)
- Hay Mar Yae Hay Mar ဟေမာရဲ့ဟေမာ (October 1992)
- Padauk Yate Wel ပိတောက်ရိပ်ဝယ် (December 1992)
- Nay Kaung Thwar Hmar Par နေကောင်းသွားမှာပါ (January 1993)
- Hma... Tho... Chit Thu မှ...သို့...ချစ်သူ (February 1993)
- Maung မောင် (May 1993)
- A Chit Nae Mile Paung Gaday အချစ်နဲ့မိုင်ပေါင်းကုဋေ (June 1993)
- Shwe Dat Pyar ရွှေဓာတ်ပြား (August 1993)
- Tain Hlwar Moh Moh Lwin တိမ်လွှာမို့မို့လွင် (August 1993)
- Shwe Phyit Tot Khit Huang Yay ရွှေဖြစ်တော့ခေတ်ဟောင်းရေ (1993)
- Shwe Kha Yee ရွှေခရီး (January 1994)
- Poe Hpa Lan 3 ပိုးဖလံ ၃ (February 1994)
- May Par Naing မေ့ပါနိုင် (April 1994)
- 972 ကိုးရာခုနှစ်ဆယ့်နှစ် (May 1994)
- Bel Yee Sar Ko A Chit Sone Lae ဘယ်ရည်းစားကိုအချစ်ဆုံးလဲ (May 1994)
- A Myo Thar Tway Tha Di Htar အမျိုးသားတွေသတိထား (May 1994)
- Shwe Yupar Yone ရွှေရူပါရုံ (May 1994)
- A Hman Khun Ar Pay Tha Nar Par အမုန်းခွန်အားပေးသနားပါ (August 1994)
- Maunt La Pyae Wun မောင့်လပြည့်ဝန်း (September 1994)
- Myet Lone Yine မျက်လုံးရိုင်း (September 1994)
- Hlay Kalay လှေကလေး (1995)
- A Tate Ei A Yate အတိတ်၏အရိပ် (March 1995)
- A Chit Yuu Lay Pone Pyin အချစ်ရူးမလေးပုံပြင် (March 1995)
- U Lay Gyi ဦးလေးကြီး (April 1995)
- Chit Tae Thu Nge Chin ချစ်တဲ့သူငယ်လေ (July 1995)
- Maung Lu Chaw မောင်လူချော (July 1995)
- Ta Kabar Char Lae Chit Nay Mal တစ်ကမ္ဘာခြားလည်းချစ်နေမယ် (August 1995)
- Shwe Dat Pyar 2 ရွှေဓါတ်ပြား ၂ (September 1995)
- Ma Nay Tat Tot Buu မနေတက်တော့ဘူး (1996)
- Ko Pyan Lar Pyi ကိုယ်ပြန်လာပြီ (July 1996)
- Thu သူ (1996)
- Hay Mar A Chit Sone Tha Chin Myar ဟေမာအချစ်ဆုံးသီချင်းများ (1996)
- Hay Mar A Chit Sone Tha Chin Myar 2 ဟေမာအချစ်ဆုံးသီချင်းများ ၂ (January 1997)
- A Sone Mae A Chit အဆုံးမဲ့အချစ် (September 1997)
- Chit Thu A Twet ချစ်သူအတွက် (October 1997)
- Sel Ko Khwel Hnin Si ဆယ်ကိုယ်ခွဲ နှင်းဆီ (December 1997)
- Yin Khone Than Nan Net Khin ရင်ခုန်သံနံနက်ခင်း (1998)
- Shwe Dat Pyar 3 ရွှေဓါတ်ပြား ၃ (July 1998)
- Mya Nandar မြနန္ဒာ (August 1998)
- Kyay Say Ta Man ကျေးစေတမန် (October 1998)
- Pa Hta Ma Sone Tha Chin Myar ပထမဆုံးသီချင်းများ (December 1998)
- Ma Lay Let Khat Than မလေးလက်ခတ်သံ (September 1999)
- A Chit Myar Swar Phyint Thar အချစ်များစွာဖြင့်သာ (February 2000)
- Doe Kalay ဒိုးကလေး (July 2002)

=== With other artists ===
- Kyo Pote (+ S Kenneth) ကြိုပို့ (+ အက်စ်ကဲနက်) (1987)
- Char Tate Hay Mar (+ Ah Tun) ချာတိတ်ဟေမာ (+ အထွန်း) (1988)
- Chit... Kaung Lay (+ Sai Htee Saing, Zaw Win Shein, Jet Mya Thaung) ချစ်...ကောင်လေး (+ စိုင်းထီးဆိုင် ၊ ဇော်ဝင်းရှိန် ၊ ဂျက်မြသောင်း) (May 1989)
- Poe Hpa Lan 2 (+ Chit Kaung) ပိုးဖလံ ၂ (+ ချစ်ကောင်း) (November 1991)
- Let Yay Ta Pyin Tae (+ Sai Htee Saing) လက်ရည်တစ်ပြင်တည်း (+ စိုင်းထီးဆိုင်) (February 1994)
- Mingalar Law Ka (+ Chit Kaung) မင်္ဂလာပါလောက (+ ချစ်ကောင်း) (July 1994)
- Chit Pann Thone Pwint (+ Ni Ni Win Shwe, Poe Darli Thein Tan) ချစ်ပန်းသုံးပွင့် (+ နီနီဝင်းရွှေ ၊ ပိုးဒါလီသိန်းတန်) (September 1995)
- Ma Ma Moe (+ Aung Yin) မမမိုး (+ အောင်ရင်) (November 1995)
- Hnit Ko Tu Chit Tha Hmya (+ Aung Yin) နှစ်ကိုယ်တူချစ်သမျှ (+ အောင်ရင်) (December 1998)
- Yin Twin Su (+ May Sweet, Ni Ni Win Shwe) ရင်တွင်းဆု (+ မေဆွိ ၊ နီနီဝင်းရွှေ) (January 1999)
- Nate Thit Tway Htae Hmar (+ Zaw Win Htut) နေ့သစ်တွေထဲမှာ (+ ဇော်ဝင်းထွဋ်) (May 2000)
- Kyal Ta Pwint Mway Phwar Chin (Live Show) ကြယ်တစ်ပွင့်မွေးဖွားခြင်း Live Show (December 2004)
