= Chit Khwint Ma Paing =

1956 Burmese Film

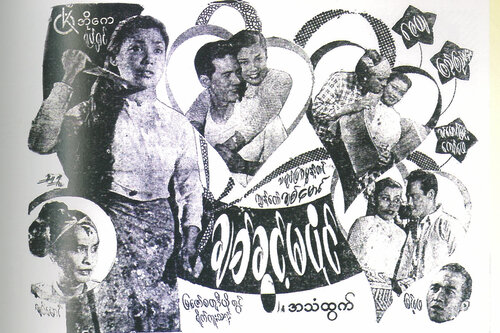
- Film poster
- Burmese: ချစ်ခွင့်မပိုင်
- Directed by: Chit Maung
- Starring: Zeya; Kyi Kyi Htay; Khin Maung Myint; Kyaw Pe
- Cinematography: Htun Myint
- Music by: A1 Khin Maung; Soe Myint
- Production company: OK Films
- Release date: 1956
- Running time: 114 minutes
- Country: Myanmar
- Language: Burmese

Chit Khwint Ma Paing (Burmese: ချစ်ခွင့်မပိုင်) is a 1956 Burmese black-and-white drama film, directed by Chit Maung starring Zeya, Kyi Kyi Htay, Khin Maung Myint and Kyaw Pe.

== Cast ==
- Zeya as Min Din
- Kyi Kyi Htay as Mal Kyi
- Khin Maung Myint as Phoe Khin
- Kyaw Pe as Pe Tin
- Chit Maung as Chit Maung
- Myint Pe as Myint Pe

== Award ==
Year	Award	Category	Nominee	Result
1956	Myanmar Motion Picture Academy Awards	Best Actress	Kyi Kyi Htay	Won
