= Pan Myaing Lal Ka Oo Yin Mhu =

1989 Burmese Film

- Film poster
- Burmese: ပန်းမြိုင်လယ်ကဥယျာဉ်မှူး
- Directed by: Maung Tin Oo
- Screenplay by: Maung Thar Ra
- Story by: Maung Tin Oo
- Produced by: Maung Sein Nwe
- Starring: Kyaw Hein; Nay Aung; Theingi Htun
- Production company: Shwe Pyi Taw Films
- Release date: 1989
- Running time: 106 minutes
- Country: Myanmar
- Language: Burmese

Pan Myaing Lal Ka Oo Yin Mhu (Burmese: ပန်းမြိုင်လယ်ကဥယျာဉ်မှူး) is a 1989 Burmese drama film, directed by Maung Tin Oo starring Kyaw Hein, Nay Aung and Theingi Htun.

== Cast ==
- Kyaw Hein as Tar Tee
- Nay Aung as Myint Htway
- Theingi Htun as Nyo Ma

== Award ==
Year	Award	Category	Nominee	Result
1989	Myanmar Motion Picture Academy Awards	Best Actor	Kyaw Hein	Won
