= Moon Tae Chain Twin Nay Win The =

1982 Burmese Film

- Film poster
- Burmese: မွန်းတည့်ချိန်တွင်နေဝင်သည်
- Directed by: Kyaw Hein
- Screenplay by: Kyaw Hein
- Starring: Kyaw Hein; Cho Pyone; Moht Moht Myint Aung; Khin Khin Thite
- Cinematography: Nay Htake Khaung
- Edited by: Kyin Maung
- Music by: Sandayar Hla Htut
- Production company: Zabyu Htun Su Paung Films
- Release date: September 10, 1982
- Running time: 101 minutes
- Country: Myanmar
- Language: Burmese

Moon Tae Chain Twin Nay Win The (Burmese: မွန်းတည့်ချိန်တွင်နေဝင်သည်) is a 1982 Burmese black-and-white drama film, directed by Kyaw Hein starring Kyaw Hein, Cho Pyone, Moht Moht Myint Aung and Khin Khin Thite.

== Cast ==
- Kyaw Hein as Ko Wyne
- Cho Pyone as Kha Yay
- Moht Moht Myint Aung as Ma Phyu
- Khin Khin Thite as Khin Khin Thite
- May Thit as Daw May Thit

== Awards ==
Year	Award	Category	Nominee	Result
1982	Myanmar Motion Picture Academy Awards	Best Actor	Kyaw Hein	Won
1982	Myanmar Motion Picture Academy Awards	Best Actress	Cho Pyone	Won
