= The Collegian (film) =

1959 Burmese film

- poster
- Burmese: ကောလိပ်ဂျင်
- Directed by: Chin Sein
- Based on: College Student by Za Wa Na
- Starring: Collegian Ne Win; Myint Myint Khin
- Production company: Zabyu Aye Films
- Release date: February 1959
- Running time: 119 minutes
- Country: Myanmar
- Language: Burmese

The Collegian (Burmese: ကောလိပ်ဂျင်) is a 1959 Burmese black-and-white drama film, directed by Chin Sein starring Collegian Ne Win and Myint Myint Khin.

== Cast ==
- Collegian Ne Win as Ko Thein Pe
- Myint Myint Khin as Ma Aye Sein
