= Shwe Gaung Pyaung =

1976 Burmese Film

- Film poster
- Burmese: ရွှေဂေါင်းပြောင်
- Directed by: Toe Nyunt
- Screenplay by: Thit Oo
- Based on: Shwe Gaung Pyaung (comic) by Aung Aung
- Starring: Toe Nyunt; Myo Thant; Sai Wunna; Win Hlaing; Sandar; Eant Kyaw; May Thit
- Cinematography: Than Maung; Maung Maung
- Edited by: Toe Nyunt
- Music by: A1 Khin Maung; Myint Zaw
- Production company: Mya Zaw Films
- Release date: 1976
- Running time: 104 minutes
- Country: Myanmar
- Language: Burmese

Shwe Gaung Pyaung (Burmese: ရွှေဂေါင်းပြောင်) is a 1976 Burmese black-and-white action film, directed by Toe Nyunt starring Toe Nyunt, Myo Thant, Sai Wunna, Win Hlaing, Sandar, Eant Kyaw and May Thit.

== Cast ==
- Toe Nyunt as Shwe Gaung Pyaung
- Myo Thant as Thiha
- Sai Wunna as Kyaw Swar
- Win Hlaing as Thet Hnin
- Sandar as Wutt Hmone
- Eant Kyaw as Phoe Mya
- May Thit as mother of Shwe Gaung Pyaung
- Thar Gaung as the Villager
