= Phoo Sar Lan Sone =

1969 Burmese Film

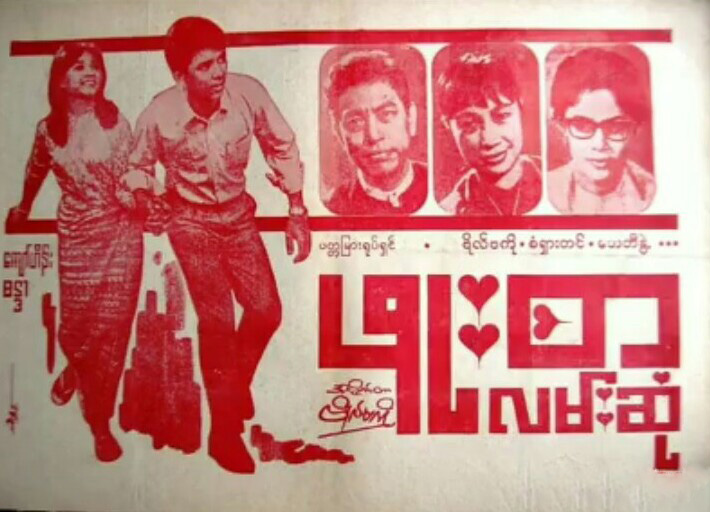
- Film poster
- Burmese: ဖူးစာလမ်းဆုံ
- Directed by: Bo Ba Ko
- Starring: Kyaw Hein; Sandar; Bo Ba Ko; San Shar Tin; Baby Nwet
- Production company: Padamyar Films
- Release date: 1969
- Running time: 113 minutes
- Country: Myanmar
- Language: Burmese

Phoo Sar Lan Sone (Burmese: ဖူးစာလမ်းဆုံ) is a 1969 Burmese black-and-white drama film, directed by Bo Ba Ko starring Kyaw Hein, Sandar, Bo Ba Ko, San Shar Tin and Baby Nwet.

== Cast ==
- Kyaw Hein
- Sandar
- Bo Ba Ko
- San Shar Tin
- Baby Nwet
