= Ma Thudamasari (film) =

1994 Burmese Film

- Film Poster
- Burmese: မသုဓမ္မစာရီ
- Directed by: Kyi Soe Tun
- Screenplay by: Kyi Soe Tun
- Based on: Ma Thudamasari by Moe Moe (Inya)
- Starring: Kyaw Ye Aung; Moht Moht Myint Aung; Zaw Lin; Myint Myint Khine; San San Aye; Khin Soe Paing
- Edited by: U Tin Myint; U Myo Myint; Daw Nu Nu Aye; Daw Su Su Win
- Music by: Maung Ko Ko
- Production company: Thar Nyunt Films
- Release date: 1994
- Running time: 119 minutes
- Country: Myanmar
- Language: Burmese

Ma Thudamasari (Burmese: မသုဓမ္မစာရီ) is a 1994 Burmese drama film, directed by Kyi Soe Tun starring Kyaw Ye Aung, Moht Moht Myint Aung, Zaw Lin, Myint Myint Khine, San San Aye and Khin Soe Paing. It was based on the popular novel Ma Thudamasari written by Moe Moe (Inya).

== Cast ==
- Moht Moht Myint Aung as Ma Thudamasari, Thein Mya
- Myint Myint Khine as Ngwe Hmone, mother of Ma Thudamasari
- Zaw Lin as Thaung Phay
- Kyaw Ye Aung as Hla Khine
- San San Aye as Shwe Hmone, aunt of Ma Thudamasari
- Khin Soe Paing as Htway Sein

== Awards ==
Year	Award	Category	Nominee	Result
1994	Myanmar Motion Picture Academy Awards	Best Actress	Moht Moht Myint Aung	Won
1994	Myanmar Motion Picture Academy Awards	Best Cinematography	Ko Ko Htay	Won
