= Nwet Nwet Mu =

Burmese actress

- နွဲ့နွဲ့မူ
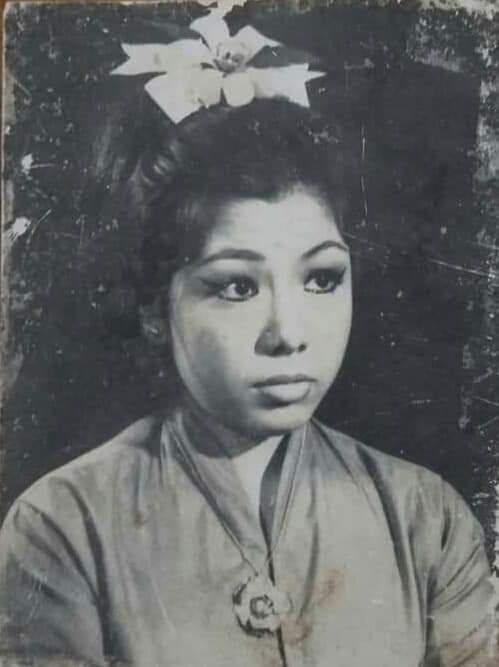
- Born: Mya Than Nwet; 18 August 1950; Hinthada, Burma
- Died: 13 June 2011 (aged 60); New Yangon General Hospital, Yangon, Myanmar
- Occupation: Actress
- Years active: 1965–2011
- Children: 2
- Awards: Myanmar Motion Picture Academy Awards (Best Actress Award for 1974)

Nwet Nwet Mu (Burmese: နွဲ့နွဲ့မူ; born Mya Than Nwet 18 August 1950 – 13 June 2011) was a Burmese actress. She won Best Actress Award in 1974 Myanmar Motion Picture Academy Awards. She was famous from the 1970s until her death.

== Early life ==
Nwet Nwet Mu was born on 18 August 1950 to parents, U Thaw and Daw Thein Shin in Hinthada, Burma.

== Career ==
Nwet Nwet Mu first entered the art world in 1965 at the age of 15 with the wish of her mother with the film Myitta Moe Myay directed by Shwe Myint Moe Film Company. She returned to the art world at the age of 16 with the film "Weretiger" directed by Thein Htut and Than Htut from the A1 Film Company and was recognized by the audience. She continued acted in films Myittar Sein Sein, Myittar A Kyin Thar, Pyin Oo Lwin Mha Sein Ta Pwint, Yaw Sayar Gyi, San Shwe Myint Yae Mar Mar, Bawa Thitsar, Thitsar Shin Ma Lay Hnint Thu, Kyun Taw Chit Thel Mar Na Khae, Nge Kywan Swe, A Thel Phyu Ma Lay Naw May Phaw, Myat Hsu Win Yae Chit San Eain, Du Ma Htauk Let Ma Myauk and Pyin Ma Ngot To.

In the Burmese film world around 1970s, Nwet Nwet Mu was also a popular and successful actor such as Win Oo, Khin Than Nu, Myint Myint Khin, Wah Wah Win Shwe, Nyunt Win, Daisy Kyaw Win, Htun Wai, Kyaw Swe, Cho Pyone, Kawleikgyin Ne Win, Aung Lwin among audiences.

Nwet Nwet Mu was successful in the 1970s. Her most famous films were Naw Ku Ma, Pyin Ma Ngot To alongside Kawleikgyin Ne Win, Kyaw Hein, Eant Kyaw directed by A1 Maung Hla Myo, Chit Thu Ngal Chin, Chit Tae Yet Ko Kyo Nay Mal, Nay Chi Phyar Mha Nway Thaw Kyaung, Chit Hlaing Ga Yet, San Shwe Myint Yae Lay Khin Khin, Du Ma Htauk Let Ma Myauk were successful at that time and were accepted by the audience. She won Best Actress Award in 1974 Myanmar Motion Picture Academy Awards for the film Naw Ku Ma directed by Ko Nyein Nyein from Shwe La Min Film Company. Daughter and Mothers, a 1991 film directed by Kyi Soe Tun was also huge success.

In Burmese Video Era, she filmed A Chit Haung Ko Hlae Kyi Par, Law Ba Man Hone, Thi Par Pyi, Nya Ka Wai, Than Yaw Zin Nu Nu, Thar Bay Tar with her Naw Ku Ma Film Production.

== Death ==
Nwet Nwet Mu died of a gastric hemorrhage on June 13, 2011, at 5:50 am at the New Yangon General Hospital (Japan General Hospital). At the time of her death, she left a son, a daughter and three grandchildren.
