= Kyi Kyi Htay =

Burmese actress

- ကြည်ကြည်ဌေး
- Born: Ma Thein Kyin; 19 March 1924; Letpadan, Pegu Province, British Burma
- Died: 4 March 2000 (aged 75); Yangon, Myanmar
- Other names: Aung Mya Kyin, Auk Chin Ma, Marla Yi

Kyi Kyi Htay (Burmese: ကြည်ကြည်ဌေး, pronounced [tɕì tɕì tʰé]; 19 March 1924 – 4 March 2000) was the first winning actress of the Myanmar Academy Award for the Best Female Artiste Award (now Best Actress Award) in 1952. Being a versatile actress in the golden Burmese film world, she was awarded the title Wunna Kyawhtin by the government.

== Early life ==
Kyi Kyi Htay was born in a small town of Letbadan in Bago Division in Lower Burma to U Po Yin and Daw Ohn Kywe. She was the youngest among five siblings. Her original name was Ma Thein Kyin.

== Career ==
Kyi Kyi Htay took part in Burmese traditional opera, Zat Thabin, since her childhood and became famous under the name Aung Mya Kyin, Auk Chin Ma and Marla Yi. She crossed over to films in 1952, and won her first Burmese Academy Award with her debut film Chit Thet-Wai. She won three more Academy Awards in 1956, 1970 and 1978.

She was married to U Aung Thein, and had two children. She died on 4 March 2000 in Yangon.

== Awards and nominations ==
Year	Award	Category	Nominated work	Result
1952	Myanmar Academy Award	Best Female Artiste	Chit Thet Wai (Dear Thet Wai)	Won
1956	Myanmar Academy Award	Best Female Artiste	Chit Khwint Ma Paing (Not Able to Love)	Won
1970	Myanmar Academy Award	Best Actress for Supporting Role	Nu Nu Nge Nge (Delicate and Youthful	Won
1978	Myanmar Academy Award	Best Actress for Supporting Role	Lu Zaw (The Eminent One)	Won
	Wunna Kyawhtin			Won

== Filmography ==
It is said that Kyi Kyi Htay took part as an actress in more than 300 films.

The famous ones are:

- Chit Thet Wai (Dear Thet Wai)
- Yadanabon
- AkyawAmaw (The Renowned One)
- Sakawma (Cakkoma)
- Main Ma Bawa (Woman’s Life)
- Zagar Pyaw Thaw Athel Hnalone (The Speaking Heart)
- Pann Pan Lyet Par (Still Wearing the Flower)
- Chit Khwint Ma Paing (Not Able to Love)
- Nu Nu Nge Nge (Delicate and Youthful)
- Lu Zaw (The Eminent One)
