= A Tway =

1962 Burmese Film

- Film poster
- Burmese: အတွေ့
- Directed by: Shwe Done Bi Aung
- Starring: Maung Thin; Thi Thi; Aung Lwin; San Shar Tin; Kyauk Lone
- Cinematography: Htun Hlaing
- Music by: A1 Saya Nhyar; U Ba Thein
- Production company: Pan Wai Wai Films
- Release date: 1962
- Running time: 92 minutes
- Country: Myanmar
- Language: Burmese

A Tway (Burmese: အတွေ့) is a 1962 Burmese black-and-white drama film, directed by Shwe Done Bi Aung starring Maung Thin, Thi Thi, Aung Lwin, San Shar Tin and Kyauk Lone.

== Cast ==
- Maung Thin as Maung Thin
- Thi Thi as Thi Thi
- Aung Lwin as Maung Lwin
- San Shar Tin as Ngwe Khin
- Kyauk Lone as Kyauk Lone

== Awards ==
Year	Award	Category	Nominee	Result
1962	Myanmar Motion Picture Academy Awards	Best Actress	Thi Thi	Won
1962	Myanmar Motion Picture Academy Awards	Best Supporting Actor	Kyauk Lone	Won
