= Khin Maung Zaw =

Human rights lawyer

U Khin Maung Zaw
- Born: 1948 (age 77–78); Pyinmana, Myanmar
- Education: Mandalay University
- Occupation: Human rights lawyer

Khin Maung Zaw (born 1948), known honorifically as U Khin Maung Zaw, is a Burmese lawyer and human rights activist based in Myanmar. He represented Aung San Suu Kyi, among other Myanmar nationals who receive undemocratic trials.

== Biography ==
Zaw was born in Pyinmana in 1948, soon after British rule in Burma ended. As a student at Mandalay University, he attempted to form a students' union, which had been banned during the ruling of Ne Win. For his activism, he was sent to a prison camp on the Coco Islands. In 1972, he was released, until being re-imprisoned for two years in 1978 for joining a student protest. He obtained a degree in law from Mandalay University at age 37.

In 2017, Zaw took represented two Reuters journalists who were imprisoned for uncovering a massacre of Rohingya muslims.

Zaw serves as the lawyer for Aung San Suu Kyi, a former state counsellor of Myanmar who played a vital role in the country's transition to partial democracy, who was charged for several offences.

When Aung San Suu Kyi’s National League for Democracy won elections in 2015, beginning a precarious power-sharing with the military, Khin Maung Zaw distanced himself from the political party.
