= Cho Pyone =

Burmese film actress and singer

- ချိုပြုံး
- Born: Aye Aye Myint; 17 November 1946 (age 79); Rangoon, Burma (now Yangon, Myanmar)
- Occupations: Actor; Singer
- Parent(s): Chan Htun; Kyi Kyi
- Awards: Myanmar Motion Picture Academy Awards

Cho Pyone (Burmese: ချိုပြုံး; born on 17 November 1946) is a Burmese film actress and singer. She has won multiple Myanmar Motion Picture Academy Awards throughout her career. She has had a prolific film and music career.

Cho Pyone was born Aye Aye Myint in Rangoon, Burma (now Yangon, Myanmar) on 17 November 1946 to Chan Htun and his wife, Kyi Kyi. Her music career debuted with the song "Female Soldier."

== Filmography ==
=== Films ===
- Ta Kyawt Hna Kyawt Tay Ko Thi (1971)
- Aww Main Ma Main Ma (1972)
- Chit Thu Yway Mal Chit Wae Lal (1975)
- Chit A Mhya (1979)
- Moon Tae Chain Twin Nay Win The (1982)
- Kyee Yaung Saung Thaw Daung (1985)
- Lwan Nay Mal Ma Ma (1986)
- A May Chay Yar (1997)
- Da Bae Naw (2003)
- Michelle (မီချယ်) (2026)

=== Television Series ===
- A Yake (အရိပ်) (2018)
- Moe Kaung Kin Eain Met (မိုးကောင်းကင်အိပ်မက်) (2018)
- Where There is Love (ချစ်ခြင်းတရားတို့ရှိရာ) (2019)
- Aye Yake Nyein (အေးရိပ်ငြိမ်) (2022)
- Kar Yan Lwae Myittar (ကာရန်လွဲမေတ္တာ) (2023)
- The Mist Forever (မြူနှင်းတို့ထာဝရဝေ) (2025)
