= Lu Zaw =

1978 Burmese Film

- Film poster
- Burmese: လူဇော်
- Directed by: Zaw Htet
- Screenplay by: Nay Lin Htun
- Based on: Lu Maw by Aung Lin
- Produced by: Than Htun
- Starring: Collegian Ne Win; Kyaw Hein; Kyi Kyi Htay; Swe Zin Htaik; Myint Naing
- Cinematography: Than Maung
- Edited by: Shwe Kat Kyay; Tin Ngwe; Thein Swe; Kyi Shwe
- Music by: Maung Ko Ko; Myat Thu
- Production company: Shwe Nyar Maung Films
- Release date: 1978
- Running time: 123 minutes
- Country: Myanmar
- Language: Burmese

Lu Zaw (Burmese: လူဇော်) is a 1978 Burmese black-and-white drama film, directed by Zaw Htet starring Collegian Ne Win, Kyaw Hein, Kyi Kyi Htay, Swe Zin Htaik and Myint Naing.

== Cast ==
- Collegian Ne Win as U Win Lwin
- Kyaw Hein as Lu Zaw
- Kyi Kyi Htay as Daw Tin Tin Kyi
- Swe Zin Htaik as Khaing
- Myint Naing as U Thet Nyunt
- Min Zaw as Mya Kyaw
- Toe Toe Lwin as Pan Hla
- Saw Naing as Hla Myint

== Award ==
Year	Award	Category	Nominee	Result
1978	Myanmar Motion Picture Academy Awards	Best Supporting Actress	Kyi Kyi Htay	Won
