= Basic Education High School No. 2 Sanchaung =

Coordinates: 16°48′23″N 96°08′6″E

Sanchaung 2 High School အ.ထ.က. (၂) စမ်းချောင်း

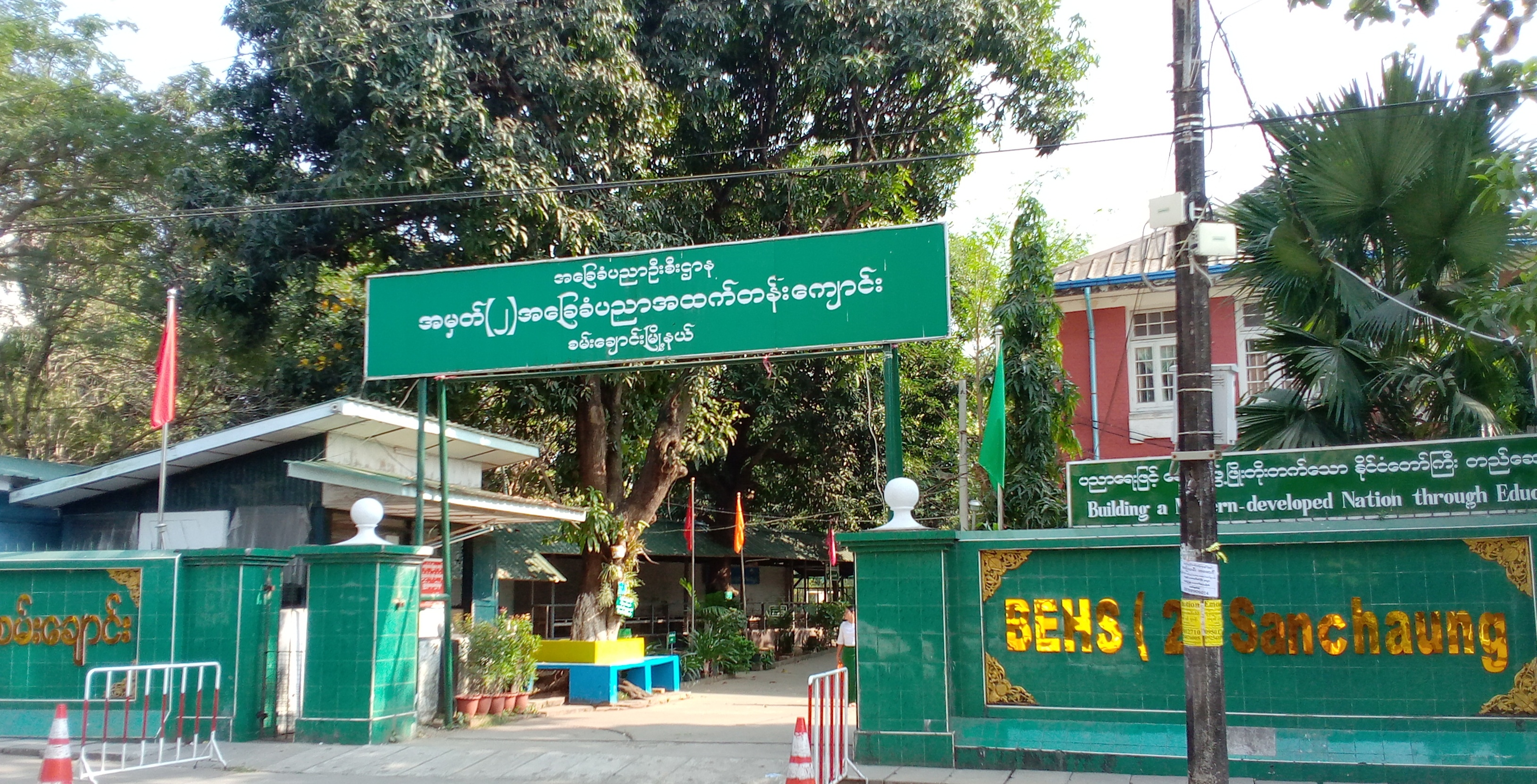
- School gate

Location
- 291 Pyay Road, Sanchaung 11111; Yangon, Yangon Region; Myanmar

Information
- Type: Public
- School number: 2
- Faculty: 150
- Grades: K-10
- Enrollment: ~4500

Designations

Yangon City Landmark

Basic Education High School No. 2 Sanchaung (Burmese: အမှတ် (၂) အခြေခံပညာအထက်တန်းကျောင်း စမ်းချောင်းမြို့နယ်; abbreviated to အ.ထ.က. (၂) စမ်းချောင်း; formerly, St. Philomena's High School; commonly known as Sanchaung 2 High School), located on Pyay Road, Sanchaung township, is a public high school in Yangon, Myanmar. The mostly-girls school offers classes from kindergarten to Tenth Standard (or Grade 1 through Grade 11 in the new nomenclature).

The school's main colonial era building, in its 13-acre (5.26 hectare) campus, is a landmark protected by the city, and is listed on the Yangon City Heritage List. Mahar Myaing Building မဟာမြိုင်ဆောင် (commonly known as အပေါ်‌‌ကျောင်း) was built on December 8th 1926. Malar Myaing Building မာလာမြိုင်ဆောင် (commonly known as ‌အောက်ကျောင်း) was built in 1938.

The school produced the top ranked students in 2009, 2010, 2013, and 2014 at national college matriculation examinations.

== Alumni ==
- Daw Swe Zin Htaik
