= Swe Zin Htaik =

Burmese actress

- ဆွေဇင်ထိုက်
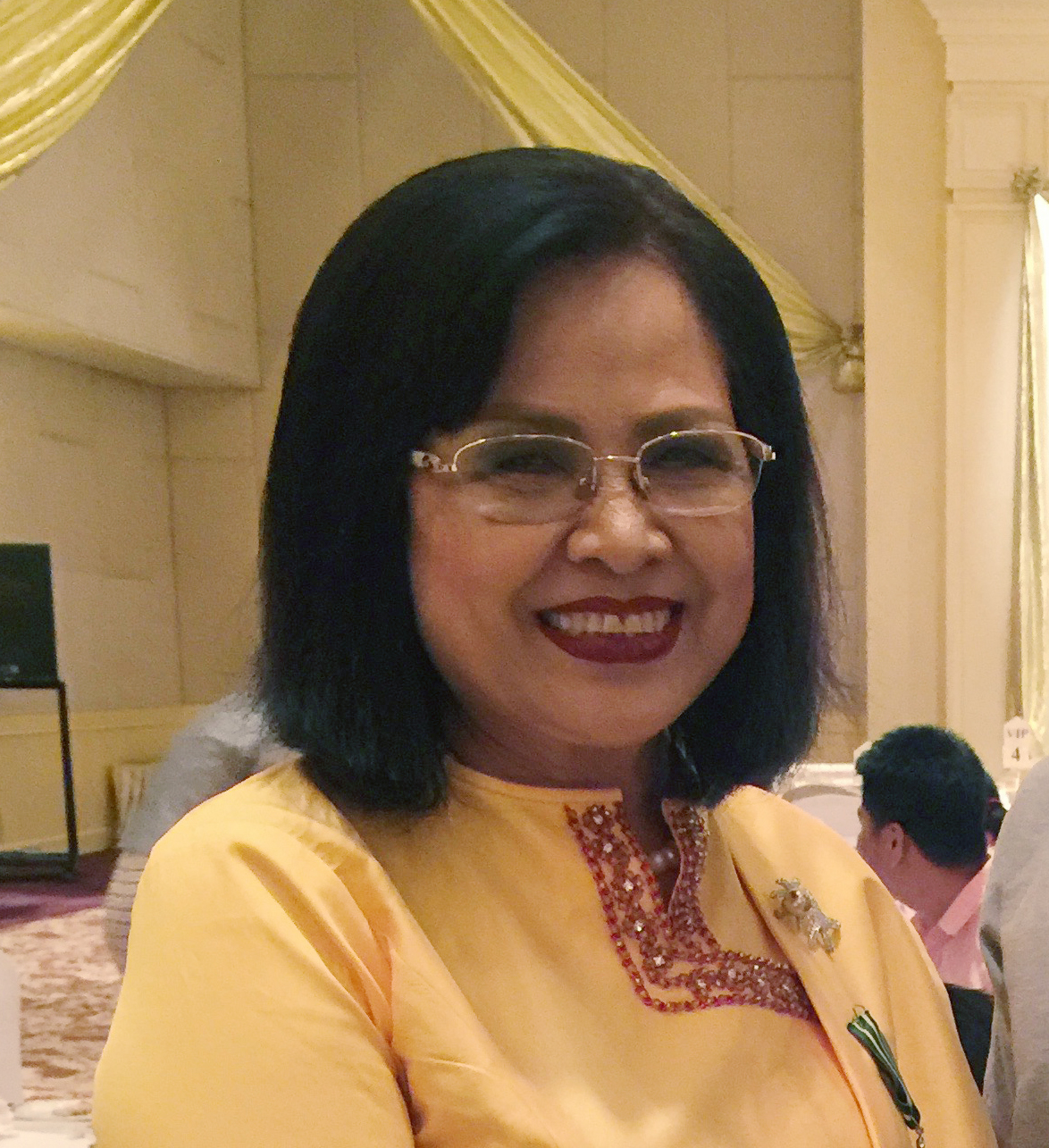
- Born: 13 June 1953 (age 73); Rangoon, Burma
- Other name: Grace
- Education: Rangoon Institute of Economics; State High School No. 2 Sanchaung
- Years active: 1971–1991
- Awards: Myanmar Academy Award (Supporting Actress, 1977)
- Website: www.graceswezinhtaik.blogspot.com

Swe Zin Htaik (Burmese: ဆွေဇင်ထိုက် [sʰwè zɪ̀ɰ̃ tʰaɪʔ]; born 13 June 1953; also spelt Swe Zin Htike and Grace) is a Myanmar Academy Award-winning actress, acting in over 200 movies throughout her film career, debuting in 1971. She retired from filming in 1991. She currently works with Population Services International, an international NGO in Burma, focusing on sex and HIV education. Swe Zin Htaik graduated from State High School No. 2 Sanchaung (now BEHS 2 Sanchaung) and subsequently attended the Rangoon Institute of Economics, graduating in 1977 with a bachelor's degree in commerce.

== Filmography ==
- Say Lo Yar Say (1971)
- A Phay Ta Khu Thar Ta Khu (1977)
- Lu Zaw (1978)
- A Kar Ka A Chit A Hnit Ka Myittar (1979)
- Tay Zar (1981)
- Sein Nae Tay Zar (1983)
- Nay Kyauk Khae (1983)
- Lwan Nay Mal Ma Ma (1986)
