= Kyaw Hein =

Burmese actor, singer, director, monk (1947–2020)

- ကျော်ဟိန်း
- Born: Kyaw Htay; 14 July 1947; Kyaung Kone Road, Sanchaung Township, Burma (present-day Myanmar)
- Died: 11 July 2020 (aged 72); Canberra, Australia
- Other names: Kittisāra (Dharma name); Sayadaw U Kittithara
- Citizenship: Myanmar (Burma)
- Education: Basic Education High School No. 4 Ahlone
- Occupations: Actor; Singer; Film director
- Years active: 1968–2008
- Spouse(s): Sandar (1960s–1970s); Than Nwe Aye
- Relatives: Dwe (nephew)
- Awards: Myanmar Motion Picture Academy Awards (Best Actor for 1979, 1982, 1989, 2003, Best Supporting Actor for 1994)
- Website: https://www.athithedi.com

Kyaw Hein (Burmese: ကျော်ဟိန်း; pronounced [tɕɔ́ hɛ́ɪɰ̃]; born Kyaw Htay (Burmese: ကျော်ဌေး; pronounced [tɕɔ́ hté]; 14 July 1947 – 11 July 2020) was a Burmese actor, film director and singer. He is the five-time winner of the Myanmar Motion Picture Academy Awards. He starred in and directed hundreds of films, and was considered one of the most important actors in Burmese cinema. He retired in 2008, and became a Theravāda Buddhist monk, with the Dharma name Kittisāra (ကိတ္တိသာရ). He died as a monk on July 11, 2020, in Canberra, Australia.

== Early life ==
Kyaw Hein was born on July 14, 1947, on the Kyaung Kone Road in Sanchaung township. His father was a retired District Police Chief named John Maung Sein (DYSP) and his mother was a housewife named Cho Cho. He was the fourth child of six children. At an early age he joined the Sein Goli gang.

In 1952 he was taught at an ABM school from first to fourth grade. He failed the fourth grade exam and had to retake during the two summer holidays. In 1956, he moved to the Ahlone Township. He attended fifth grade at Unit Karen School near Home Road Station. In 1957, he moved again within the township to the Cushion School and attended sixth grade, seventh grade (twice), eighth grade and failed ninth grade (twice), then decided to drop out. In 1964 he had moved from various townships and in total transferred to 23 different Yangon Private schools (including night schools). He later dropped out of school on 16 different occasions and became homeless. In 1965, he moved to Kamaryut township. He successfully passed ninth grade at Daw Thar Htet School. In 1966, Dagon Township, Daw Nu Nu Khin helped Kyaw Hein enrol to the tenth grade, but he joined the Myanmar Navy after only three months at his private school. His ID number was 12205 and he left the Navy in 1967. He returned to finish the tenth grade and passed. He later entered the film industry.

== Career ==
Kyaw Hein made his film debut with 1968's Hpuza Lanzon at age 20, but became widely known with his fourth film called Chit Tha-La Mon Tha-La. In 1970 his wife Sandar entered the film industry and started her career as an actress. He has played multiple roles, most notably in movies such as 1979's A-Ka Ga A-Chit A-Hnit Ga Myitta (အကာကအချစ်၊ အနှစ်ကမေတ္တ), 1982's Mun-Tet Chein Hma Ne Win Thi (မွန်းတည့်ချိန်တွင် နေဝင်သည်), 1989's Pan Myaing Le Ga U-Yin Hmu (ပန်းမြိုင်လယ်က ဥယျာဉ်မှူ), and 2003's Nay Ga Mway De La (နေကမွေးတဲ့လ). All the previously mentioned movies led him to win four National Actor Awards and one Academy Award for Best Supporting Actor in Motion Picture for a total of five Academy Awards. An honorable mention of his movie 1985’s Kyaee Yaung Saungsaw Daung (ကျီးယောင်ဆောင်သောဒေါင်).

In 1970, four years entering the film industry, he directed his first film Sein Shoet Mahote Sein (စိန်သို့မဟုတ်စိမ်). Kyaw Hein was also the lead designer and hand-painted the advertising poster under the pen name Nay Min Hteik Khaung (နေမင်းထိပ်ခေါင်). He was later nationally praised for directing the movie 1982's Mun-Tet Chein Hma Ne Win Thi (မွန်းတည့်ချိန်တွင် နေဝင်သည်).

Kyaw Hein also wrote many short stories and some novels. He was, at the time, the highest paid actor in television commercials. He also collaborated with many Burmese Musicians and even produced some of his own. The last film he directed was Kyaoe Taan (ကြိုးတန်).

In total he made and starred in over 222 films in 1967 to 2008 (over 41 years), 362 video films, and wrote fourteen songs and six books.

== Monastic life ==
On November 4, 2008, Kyaw Hein retired from the film industry and became a theravada monk. Before becoming a monk, Kyaw Hein traveled all over Burma, calling it Kyaw Hein's last farewell visit. He was ordained a monk on July 11, 2020, at 9:27am Burmese Standard Time in Canberra. He acquired the pseudonym Sayadaw U Kittithara as his proper name. Many people have criticised him for holding sermons at monasteries without the time nor experience of learning buddhism as a monk.

In 2008 Sayadaw U Kittithara was one of the patron monks who helped the creation of the Bronze Buddha Image of Knowledge and Awareness at Botahtaung Pagoda in the Botataung Township, Yangon Region. Some have referred to the temple as Kyaw Hein's temple after his contributions.

== Death ==
He had a stroke three years before his death which led to the deterioration of his health. Sayadaw U Kittithara died on July 11, 2020, at 12:55 in Canberra, Australia from complications after a stroke at the age of 73. His nephew, Htin Lin ( Dwe ), died on July 11, 2007, coinciding with the date of their deaths.

== Filmography ==
- Phoo Sar Lan Sone (ဖူးစာလမ်းဆုံ) (1969)
- Nu Nu Nge Nge (နုနုငယ်ငယ်) (1970)
- Kanyar Pyo Nae Zayar Ao (ကညာပျိုနဲ့ဇရာအို) (1972)
- Kyun Not Ko Sar Pyaw Pay Par (ကျွန်တော့်ကိုယ်စားပြောပေးပါ) (1976)
- Ta Oo Ka Saytanar Ta Oo Ka Myittar (တစ်ဦးကစေတနာတစ်ဦးကမေတ္တာ) (1976)
- Mahuyar (မဟူရာ) (1976)
- Ananda Chit Thu (အနန္တချစ်သူ) (1978)
- Lu Zaw (လူဇော်) (1978)
- Ta Khar Ka Ta Bawa (တစ်ခါကတစ်ဘဝ) (1978)
- Manawhari Ah Hla (မနော်ဟရီအလှ) (1979)
- A Kar Ka A Chit A Hnit Ka Myittar (အကာကအချစ်၊ အနှစ်ကမေတ္တာ) (1979)
- San Eain Ko Sein Nat Mhoon Pa Mal (စံအိမ်ကိုစိန်နဲ့မွှန်းပါ့မယ်) (1980)
- Khon Na Hlwar Myat Nar (ခုနစ်လွှာမျက်နှာ) (1981)
- Pyin Ma Ngote To (ပျဉ်းမငုတ်တို) (1981)
- Moon Tae Chain Twin Nay Win The (မွန်းတည့်ချိန်တွင် နေဝင်သည်) (1982)
- Tay Zar (တေဇာ) (1981)
- Bone Pyat Ba Maung (ဘုံပြတ်ဘမောင်) (1983)
- Nay Kyauk Khae (နေကျောက်ခဲ) (1983)
- Sein Nae Tay Zar (စိမ်းနဲ့တေဇာ) (1983)
- Chit Tae Yet Ko Kyo Nay Mal (ချစ်တဲ့ရက်ကိုကြိုနေမယ်) (1983)
- Mount Ah Chit Thiri (မောင့်အချစ်သီရိ) (1984)
- Ah Chit Lu Zoe Lay (အချစ်လူဆိုးလေး) (1984)
- Lwan Nay Mal Ma Ma (လွမ်းနေမယ်မမ) (1986)
- Myat Yay Sane (မျက်ရည်စိမ်း) (1988)
- Pan Myaing Lal Ka Oo Yin Mhu (ပန်းမြိုင်လယ်က ဥယျာဉ်မှူး) (1989)
- Sone Yay (စုန်ရေ) (1990)
- Thamee Khway Ma Thar Thamat (သမီးချွေးမသားသမက်) (1991)
- Chit Lonn Kay Thi (ချစ်လွန်းကေသီ) (1992)
- Ah Phayt Darr (အဖေ့ဓား) (1992)
- Pyar Yay San Thaw Pann Darr (ပျားရည်ဆမ်းသောပန်းဓား) (1992)
- Maung Yin Nga Tay Mike Kan The (မောင်ရင်ငတေမိုက်ကန်းသည်) (1993)
- Darr Taung Ko Kyaw Ywayt Mee Pin Lal Ko Phyat Me (ဓားတောင်ကိုကျော်၍မီးပင်လယ်ကိုဖြတ်မည်) (1994)
- Wai Lae Hmway Kyway Lae Hmway (ဝေလည်းမွှေးကြွေလည်းမွှေး) (1994)
- Nyoe Man Pwat Sane Yat Lay Tha Lar (ငြိုးမာန်ဖွဲ့စိမ်းရက်လေသလား) (1996)
- Nay Ka Mway Tae La (နေကမွေးတဲ့လ) (2003)
- Kyee Yaung Saung Thaw Daung (ကျီးယောင်ဆောင်သောဒေါင်း) (1985)
- Yamat Zaw (ရမ္မက်ဇော) (1985)
- Nwet Soe (နွဲ့ဆိုး) (1986)
- Sein Shoet Mahote Sein (စိန်သို့မဟုတ်စိမ်) (1971)
- Oasis Lo Ah Chit Ah Kyaung (အိုအေစစ်လိုအချစ်အကြောင်း) (1997)
- Nha Lone Thar Nyoe Wat Khan (နှလုံးသားလျှိူ့ဝှက်ခန်း) (1999)
- Maw Ha Myin Pyaing Myar (မောဟမျဥ်းပြိုင်များ) (2000)
- Swe Myo Taw Yin Bal Lo Khaw Ma Lal (ဆွေမျိုးတော်ရင်ဘယ်လိုခေါ်မလဲ) (2001)
- Ah Phay (အဖေ) (2002)
- Kyoe Tann (ကြိုးတန်း) (2008)
- Maw King U Tann (မော်ကင်းဥဒါန်း) (2012) (P.S-Filming has been completed since 2004, but was not released until 2012.)

== Discography ==
=== Album ===
- Let The Tear Birds Perch (မျက်ရည်ငှက်များ နားစေသတည်း)
- Gentlemen, Please Applaud (လူကြီးမင်းများ လက်ခုပ်တီးပါ)
- Yin Mar Tin Set Mu (2) (ယင်းမာတင်ဆက်မှု (၂))
- Self Wind Sailing (တစ်ကိုယ်တော်လေလွင့်ခြင်း)
- Songs From The Stage (စင်ပေါ်က သီချင်းများ)
- Meaningful Person (အဓိပ္ပါယ်ရှိသောလူ)
- Forever Living (ထာဝရရှင်သန်နေမယ်)
- Wi Ra Ra Tha (ဝီရရသ)
- New (အသစ်)
- Dote Dote Dote Dote (ဒုတ် ဒုတ် ဒုတ် ဒုတ်)
- Modern Antique (မော်ဒန်အင်းတစ်ခ်)
- Meaningful (အဓိပ္ပါယ်ရှိသော)
- November - 11 (နိုဝင်ဘာ - ၁၁)
- The Next (It was eventually used as the theme song in the Kyaw Hein video.)

== Books ==
=== Man life ===
- Say It On My Behalf (ကျွန်တော့်ကိုယ်စားပြောပေးပါ) (Novel) (1975, 2nd 1984)
- Colorful Pieces (ရောင်စုံအပိုင်းအစများ) (Short Stories) (2002, 2nd 2008)
- Sate Dar Pya - Dwe's Memorabilia Letter (စိတ်ဓားပြ - ကွယ်လွန်သူ ဒွေးရဲ့ အမှတ်တရစာ)
- Many Kyaw Heins (ကျော်ဟိန်းများ) (Kyaw Hein's Forty Years History) (16-November-2009)
- Acting Book (သရုပ်ဆောင်ကျမ်း)
- Complete White (လုံးဝအဖြူ) (Comic Story Book)(1st+2nd) (About Kyaw Hein)

=== Monk life ===
- Sate Dar Pya Thay Char Lar...Tae (စိတ်ဓားပြ သေချာလား . . . တဲ့)
- Lesson (သင်ခန်းစာ)
- For The Reason The Question Emerged (မေးခွန်းဖြစ်လာရတဲ့ ဖြစ်ကြောင်းကြောင့်) (October-2009)
- Let go of the feelings you feel (ခံစားနေတဲ့စိတ်ကို စွန့်လွှတ်လိုက်ပါ) (December-2009)

== Awards ==
Year	Award	Category	Nominated work	Result
1979	Myanmar Motion Picture Academy Awards	Best Actor	A Kar Ka A Chit A Hnit Ka Myittar	Won
1982	Myanmar Motion Picture Academy Awards	Best Actor	Moon Tae Chain Twin Nay Win The	Won
1989	Myanmar Motion Picture Academy Awards	Best Actor	Pan Myaing Lal Ka Oo Yin Mhu	Won
1994	Myanmar Motion Picture Academy Awards	Best Supporting Actor	Wai Lae Hmway Kyway Lae Hmway	Won
2003	Myanmar Motion Picture Academy Awards	Best Actor	Nay Ka Mway Tae La	Won
