= Myint Myint Khin =

Burmese actress

Sithu Myint Myint Khin
- မြင့်မြင့်ခင်
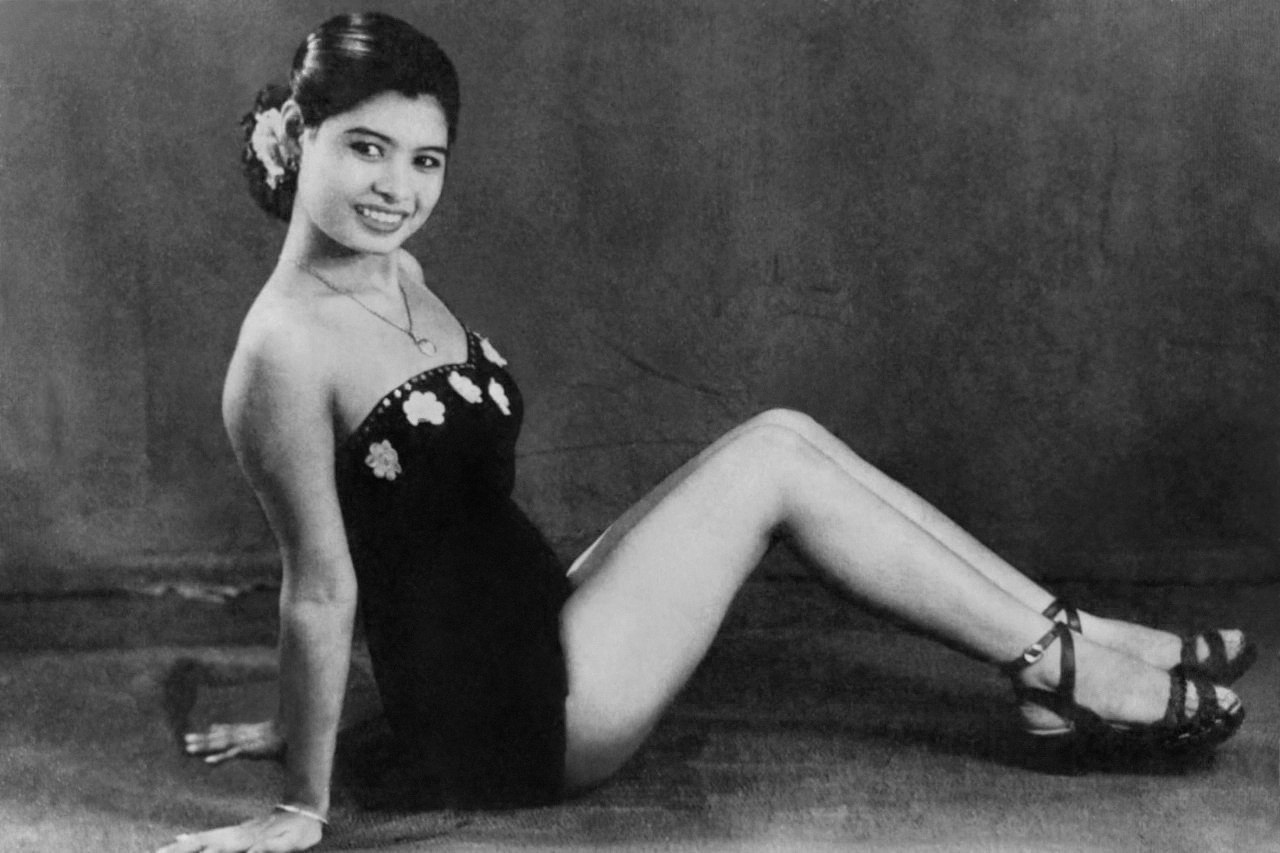
- Myint Myint Khin in the 1950s
- Born: Khin Kyi; 13 August 1934 (age 91); Thanlyin, Pegu Province; British Burma
- Other name: Rita Fairmen
- Years active: 1949–1996
- Spouse: Khin Maung Nyunt (1956–2010)
- Children: 5, including May Sweet)
- Parent(s): U Po Min and Daw Saw Kyi
- Awards: Myanmar Motion Picture Academy Awards for Chit Nyima (1957); Phyay Shaw Khway (1958); Mohn Ba De, Maung Go (1973); Mha Ta-Ba A-Cha Ma-Shi-Bi (1980); Myitmo Taung Oo Ma; Ka Kyu-Tha (1996); Myanmar Motion Picture Award (Lifetime Achievement Award - Everlasting Outstanding Honorary Award)

Sithu Myint Myint Khin (Burmese: မြင့်မြင့်ခင်, pronounced [mjɪ̰ɰ̃ mjɪ̰ɰ̃ kʰɪ̀ɰ̃]; nicknamed Baby; born Khin Kyi ([kʰɪ̀ɰ̃ tɕì]) born 13 August 1934) is a five-time Myanmar Academy Award and Myanmar Academy Award (Lifetime Achievement Award - Everlasting Outstanding Honorary Award) winning Burmese film actress who is considered one of the most talented actors of Burmese cinema. Her daughter is singer and actress May Sweet.

== Biography ==
Myint Myint Khin was born Khin Kyi to Daw Saw Kyi and U Po Min, in Thanlyin in 1934, during the waning days of the British colonial era in Myanmar. Her father, also known as E.A. Fairmen, was an Englishman from India. Myint Myint Khin's English name is Rita Fairmen. She attended a Yangon convent school up to seventh standard. She made her film debut in 1949 with Maya Shin. She was one of the main leading actresses in the 1950s, and won five Burmese Academy Awards in her nearly five-decade-long career.

In the 1950s, Myint Myint Khin also achieved moderate success as a singer. Her most famous hit, Naban Hsan, remains a Burmese standard, having been covered by later singers, including her singer daughter May Sweet.

== Personal life ==
Myint Myint Khin has retired from the film industry and lives in Yangon. She has five daughters. Her husband Khin Maung Nyunt died in February 2010. They had five children.

== Filmography ==
- Maya Shin (1949)
- Son Bo Aung Din (1955)
- Chit Nyima (1957)
- Ei Lu Baung Twin (1958)
- Kawleikgyin (1959)
- Phyay Shaw Khway (1958)
- Tein Hlwar Moht Moht Lwin (1967)
- Mone Par Tal Maung Ko (1973)
- Chit Thu Yway Mal Chit Wae Lal (1975)
- Mha Ta-Ba A-Cha Ma-Shi-Bi (1980)
- Myitmo Taung Oo Ma Ka Kyu-Tha (1996)
