= Sandayar Chit Swe =

Burmese singer-songwriter

- စန္ဒရားချစ်ဆွေ
- Born: Chit Swe; 5 June 1935; Hinthada, Irrawaddy Division, British Burma
- Died: 2005 (aged 69–70); Yangon, Myanmar
- Occupations: Singer-songwriter, pianist
- Parent(s): U Ba Hlaing (father); Daw Kyin Sein (mother)

Sandayar Chit Swe (Burmese: စန္ဒရားချစ်ဆွေ; 1935–2005) was a Burmese singer-songwriter and pianist. He is best known for his songs such as "Chit Arr Nge Ya Thu Mal", "Kha Yay Pin Aut Ka Padauk Chit Thu'", "Chit Thu Way Way Thwar Par Nae Lar", "Nge Chit Haung Nae Hnit Paung Myar Swar" and "Yay Lo Aye Tae Nway Lay Ta Nway".

== Biography ==
Chit Swe was born on 5 June 1935 in Hinthada, Irrawaddy Division, British Burma to parents U Ba Hlaing, a pianist and Daw Kyin Sein. He was eldest of four siblings. At the night of Sandayar Chit Swe birth, his father (the band's leader) took film actor Ye Khaung Chit Swe's name and was named to Sandayar Chit Swe as 'Chit Swe' during Mya Khwar Nyo silent film by A1 Film was screening at the Sharf Cinema (later Tun Lin Cinema) in Hinthada.

He learned to play the piano from his father. He learned to play piano in the silent film from pianist Nyunt Hlaing and Sagaing Hla Shwe. Music teachers of Sandayar Chit Swe were his father U Ba Hlaing, Treasurer of Hinthada U Su, Harp and pianist U Tun Pe. Sandayar Chit Swe played piano with his father when he was 10 years old at the cinema. He arrived to Rangoon in 1949 at the age of 14. There he studied music from Mr.Ben Hot and Khattara Aye.

Chit Swe then played the piano for the first time under the tutelage of musician Shwe Pyi Aye at the Win Win Theater. He then studied film music from guitarist U Ba Nyunt and pianist Sagaing Hla Shwe. In this way, he played piano at Thwin, King, Raj (Brave), Regent (pioneer), Jama, Lwin Lwin, Maw cinemas. He had the opportunity to study music from Au Aww Ba Thaung, Thaton Ba Thein, Paerock Ba Than, Than Pe, Saw Hlaing, Musician Ye Naung, Than Tin, Ko Ni, Sein Party, Hinthar Kyi, Daw Nu, Dagon Khin, Khin Khin Nyunt, Shwe Myaing Kyi. He played piano at Cho Tay Shin, Lay Hlaing Than and Tay Batemann orchestras.

== Discography ==
Year	Song Title	Functioned as		
Year	Song Title	Composer	Singer	Note
	Innya A Mar Taw Pone	No	Yes	composed by Myat Lay
	Khat Khat Ko Ma Lo Chin Tal	Yes	Yes	
	Sate Taing Kya Phit Ya Say Mal			
	Chit Arr Nge Ya Thu Mal	Yes	Yes	
	Chaw Kalayar			
	Chit Thu Way Way Thwar Par Nae Lar	Yes	Yes	
	Myittar A Thae Lay Myar	Yes	Yes	
	Myittar Nu Nu Say Lo Thu			
	Myittar Nu Nu Say Lar Yin			
	Mone Set Set Ma Ywal	Yes	Yes	sang alongside Htar
	Mone Sate Ma Yi Ywal		Yes	sang alongside Khin Yu May
	Chit Yin Lae Pyone Par Lay	Yes	No	sung by Nwet Lay
	Kyal Pwint Ka Lay Myar Ma Chit Wunt Pyi	Yes	No	sung by Pyinmana Ko Myint
	Chit Thanthaya Sate Win Mi Tal	Yes	No	sung by Ko Tin Hlaing
	Takabar Char Lae Chit Nay Mal	Yes	No	sung by Ko Min Naung
	Baydar Yae Baydar Lann	Yes	No	sung by Khin Nyunt Yi
	Thazin Nha Khat Pyaing			
	Mhway Lwun The Pann	Yes	Yes	
	Thanthayar Khayeethal	Yes	No	sung by Aung Lin
	May Kwat Ko Shar	Yes	No	sung by Aung Lin
	Chit A Yake		Yes	
	A Mone Khun Arr Pay Thanar Par	Yes	Yes	
	Tachit Shar Shar			
	Myittar Say Kyun		Yes	
	Tain Ta Man		Yes	
	Moe		Yes	
	Khayay Pin Aut Ka Padauk Chit Thu		Yes	
	A Lwan Nway Ko San Yay Htae Mhar Mhyaw Lite Mal		Yes	
	Nge Chit Haung Nae Nhit Paung Myar Swar		Yes	
	Ponepamar		Yes	
	Chit Lo Lyat Nae Way		Yes	
	Chit Ya The Ka A Thet Htet Sone		Yes	
	Tu Tu Nyi Nyi Yee Yee Pyone Pyone			
	Sein Pann Pyar Nae Way Thu Yal			
	Di Mway Nay Mingalar			
	Nyin Pal Mhar Pae Soe Mi Tal		Yes	
	Pyan Lal Sone Tway Kya Mal		Yes	
	Myet Lone Phwint Pyi Ate Kyi Par		Yes	
	Ate Ma Pyaw Nya Myar		Yes	
	Padauk Lann		Yes	
