= Kyauk Lone =

Burmese actor

- ကျောက်လုံး
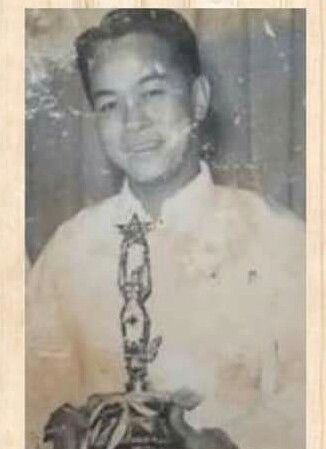
- Born: Aung Gyi; 1917; Natogyi, Myanmar
- Died: 26 May 1981 (aged 63–64)
- Occupation: Actor
- Spouse: Mya Mya
- Parents: U Thay; Daw Tin

Kyauk Lone (Burmese: ကျောက်လုံး; pronounced [tɕaʊʔ lóʊɰ̃]; also spelt as Kyauk Lon) was three-time Myanmar Academy Award-winning Burmese actor. He was the first recipient of the Best Supporting Actor Academy Award in the Burmese film industry.

He won his first Myanmar Academy Award in 1962 with the film Ah Twae (အတွေ့), achieved his second award in 1964 with the film Yinwae Ta Theint Theint (ရင်ဝယ်တသိမ့်သိမ့်) and the third award in 1965 with the film Chit Thamee (ချစ်သမီး).

== Early life and education ==
His birth name is Aung Gyi and he was born in 1917 in Natogyi, Myingyan District, to his father U Thay and Daw Tin. He is the fourth of seven siblings. As a child, he was educated in Myingyan and passed the tenth grade.

== Personal life ==
Kyauk and his wife, Daw Mya Mya, have seven children, and only his granddaughter, Wah Wah Aung, entered the art world.

== Death ==
He died on 26 May 1982 at the age of 63 at his home in Tamwe Township, Rangoon.

== Awards and nominations ==
| Year | Award | Category | Nominated work | Result |
|---|---|---|---|---|
| 1962 | Myanmar Academy Award | Best Supporting Actor | A Tway | Won |
| 1964 | Myanmar Academy Award | Best Supporting Actor | "Yinwae Ta Theint Theint" | Won |
| 1965 | Myanmar Academy Award | Best Supporting Actor | "Chit Thamee" | Won |
