= Maung Ko Ko =

Burmese musician and composer

Gita Lulin Maung Ko Ko
- ဂီတလုလင် မောင်ကိုကို
- Born: Ko Ko; 12 November 1928; Bogale, Irrawaddy Division, British Burma
- Died: 10 October 2007 (aged 78); Yangon, Myanmar
- Occupations: Musician, composer
- Years active: 1940–2007
- Parent(s): U Ba Thin (father); Daw Phwar Thein (mother)
- Relatives: Bogalay Tint Aung (brother)
- Awards: Myanmar Motion Picture Academy Awards (Best Music Award for 1991, 1994, 2002); Excellent Performance in Social Field (First Class) (1996); Excellent Performance in Arts (First Class) (2004); Doctor of Music (2007)

Gita Lulin Maung Ko Ko (Burmese: ဂီတလုလင် မောင်ကိုကို; 12 November 1928 – 10 October 2007) was a Burmese musician and composer. He is best known for his outstanding musical performances and won the Best Music Academy Awards for 1991, 1994 and 2002.

== Early life ==
Maung Ko Ko was born on 12 November 1928 to parents U Ba Thin and Daw Phwar Thein in Bogale, Irrawaddy Division, British Burma. He was fourth son of six siblings. His brother Bogalay Tint Aung was also a composer.

== Career ==
In 1939, Maung Ko Ko began studying music at the Art and Instrument Training School in Rangoon. In 1940, he began broadcasting and recording Colombia record. In 1943, he played music as the band leader in a silent film. In 1946, he became band leader in Play. In 1947, he was a band leader in Burmese sound films. He was the music director for the 1970 film Hmone Shwe Yee and supported the film with several musical blocks. However, the Academy Awards for Music were not awarded at the time.

He was the leader of a film orchestra and formed the National Symphony Orchestra. In 1946, he worked as a music director, composer and presenter for Myay Padaythar Drama, Union Day Drama, Workers' Day Drama, Farmers' Day Drama, and Armed Forces Day Drama.

In 1950 he worked as a music director at Win Win Theater. Ko Ko led a group of film and music artists as a musical movement to perform at the signing ceremony of the Sino-Burmese border in 1960 in Beijing, China. He became chairman of the Myanmar Music Council in 1966. In 1989, he co-founded the Wazira Theater Company and performed Wazira plays. In 1993, he went as Visiting Professor and taught about Burmese music and instruments in postgraduate and postgraduate courses at the Asian Cultural Council of New York, Northern Illinois University, University of Wisconsin–Madison, Illinois Wesleyan University, Kent State University, Wesleyan University, Yale University, University of Connecticut, University of California, Berkeley, University of Montreal and Canada Universities.

From 1994 to 2000 he traveled to Singapore, Malaysia and Thailand to lead a group of Tini artists group formed by Mingun Sayadaw to carry out missionary work for Propagation of the Dharma. He led film and music artists and went to Japan for the Myanmar-Japan friendship and accompanied the artists to the 30th ASEAN Music Festival. He gave a lectures on Burmese music at the University of Cologne in Germany, which was broadcast on the German radio station DW. He also gave a lectures in Berlin. He also gave lectures on Burmese music in London, England.

He also wrote articles of music and Anyeint drama in daily newspapers and monthly magazines. He worked as adviser to the Ministry of Information and member of the Cultural Committee of the Cultural University of the Ministry of Culture. He also served as the Patron of the Myanmar Film Association and Myanmar Music Association. He was member of the Music Censorship Board of the Myanmar Television and Broadcasting Department. He was also member of the judging panel for drama and stage artists. He was also a leader of rural music exploration. He served as chairman of Instrumental performances portion of National Performing Arts Competition. He nurtured and trained the National-Symphony Orchestra and served as a leader of composing music.

He won Best Music Award in 1991 Myanmar Motion Picture Academy Awards for "Mal Thida Lo Main Ma" film. He also won Best Music Award in 1994 Myanmar Motion Picture Academy Awards for "Tike Pwal Khaw Than" film. He also won Best Music Award in 2002 Myanmar Motion Picture Academy Awards for "Hsan Yay" film.

The last songs written by Maung Ko Ko was 10 Christian hymns for the Diamond jubilee of Yangon University. He played the background music for the DVD film "Aryone Tat Lay Nyee Net Lay". He also composed "8 victories of Buddha" and "Goodwill" songs for Myanmar Radio and Television.

Maung Ko Ko was awarded the Excellent Performance in Social Field (First Class) in 1996 and Excellent Performance in Arts (First Class) in 2004. On 10 August 2007, he was awarded an honorary Doctor of Music degree by the Education Department of National University of Arts and Culture, Yangon, to honor a new generation of artists who has excelled in the field of music with his own talents in the field of music.

== Death ==
Maung Ko Ko died on 10 October 2007, at Yangon General Hospital. He was about 79 years old at the time of his death, leaving behind a son and four daughters.
