= Mya Chay Gyin Ma Ngwe Myaing =

Burmese dance performer

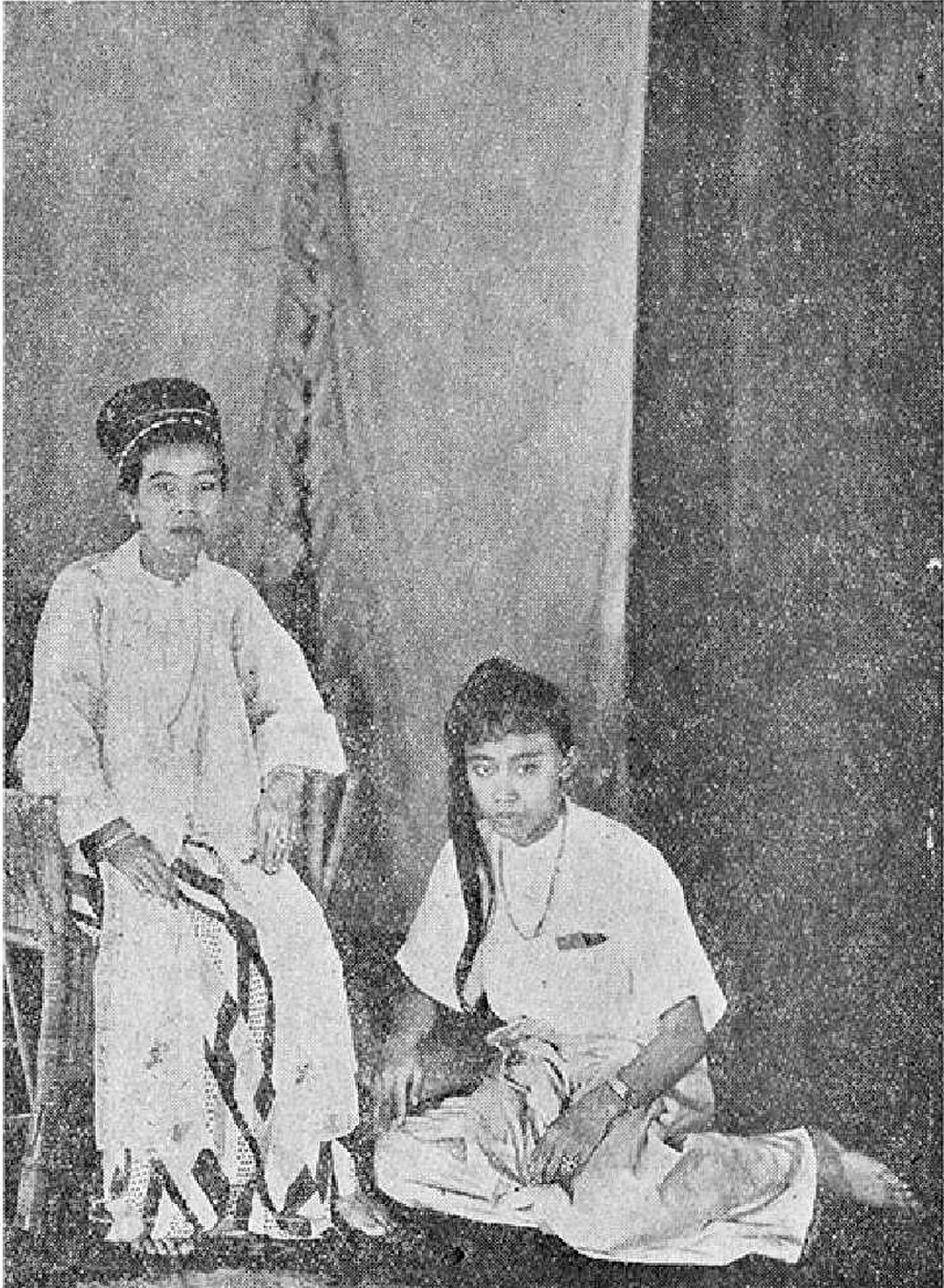
- Mya Chay Gyin Ma Ngwe Myaing and Shwe Man Tin Maung
- Born: Ngwe Hlaing; 21 November 1894; Wednesday, 10th waning of Tazaungmon 1256 ME; Obo ward, Kyimyindaing Township, Rangoon, British Burma
- Died: 20 September 1959 (aged 64); Sunday, 4th waning of Tawthalin 1321 ME; Shanpwe ward, Mandalay
- Citizenship: Burmese
- Occupation: A prominent Burmese dance performer
- Years active: 1906 – 1934
- Spouse: Ko Ko Gyi
- Partner: Aung Si Bala • Ba Hlaing • Po Sein • Sein Beda
- Children: (adopted); Maung Maung (son); Sein Sein (daughter)

"Mya Chay-Gyin" Ma Ngwe Myaing (Burmese: မြခြေချင်း မငွေမြိုင်, pronounced [mja̰ tɕʰè dʑɪ́ɰ̃ maʔ ŋwè mjàɪɰ̃] lit. 'Emerald Anklet Ma Ngwe Myaing'; born Ngwe Hlaing; 21 November 1894 – 20 September 1959) was a Burmese dance performer of the twentieth century, in the tradition of Ma Htwe Lay. She is said to be a mother of the Mandalay's third dramatic arts era.

Unlike her contemporary dancers– Awba Thaung and Liberty Ma Mya Yin who were anyeint dancers– Ma Ngwe Myaing was a zat pwe dancer.

== Biography ==
=== Early life ===
Ngwe Hlaing was born in 1894 to U Aung Ba and Daw Nyein Zan at Obo ward, Kyimyindaing Township, Rangoon, and had nine other siblings.

Being passionate about singing and dancing, her father made her learn traditional dance when she was nine.

=== Career as a dancer ===
After studying for three years, she started her own career as a dance performer with the stage name Mya Chay Gyin Ma Ngwe Myaing at Mandalay.

At her age 19, she entered into the anyeint industry. But after two years, she transferred to her original career– zat dancer.

Her most-partnered duet dancer was Aung Si Bala. She also partnered with Sein Oak, Ba Lun, Ba Tun and Ba Hlaing in duets. She and the Great Po Sein were also popular partners. But she was the main draw as audiences came to see her in the duets. Her peak of popularity was when she danced with Ba Hlaing and Sein Beda at the age of 30.

Shwe Man Tin Maung was one of her students.

=== Later life ===
At her age 40, she retired from professional dancing, and started her life as an agent of Naga Daw Oo's Naga cigar chain.

Ngwe Myaing died on 20 September 1959 in Mandalay.

== Works ==
Her Aung Bala style dance was renowned.

She performed well-known songs composed by YMB Saya Tin, Nandawshe Saya Tin and Sagaing Saya Kyi such as Shwe Kyee Nyo (The Golden Crow), Sandaku Myaing, Arkarthazoe and Saungdawku, and in stage plays, including "The History of Shwethalyaung Temple", "Phawt Phyu Mg Yaw", "Chaepawa Tahtaung Mg Me Gaung", "Aṅgulimāla" and "Hathtilinga".

== Family ==
She was married to sub-inspector Ko Ko Gyi at 21 but had no children. She adopted two children: Maung Maung and Sein Sein.

== See also ==
- Burmese dance
- Anyeint
- Sin Kho Ma Lay
- Yindaw Ma Lay
- Ma Htwe Lay
- Aung Bala
