= Mandalay Thabin =

Dramatic arts industry in Mandalay, Myanmar

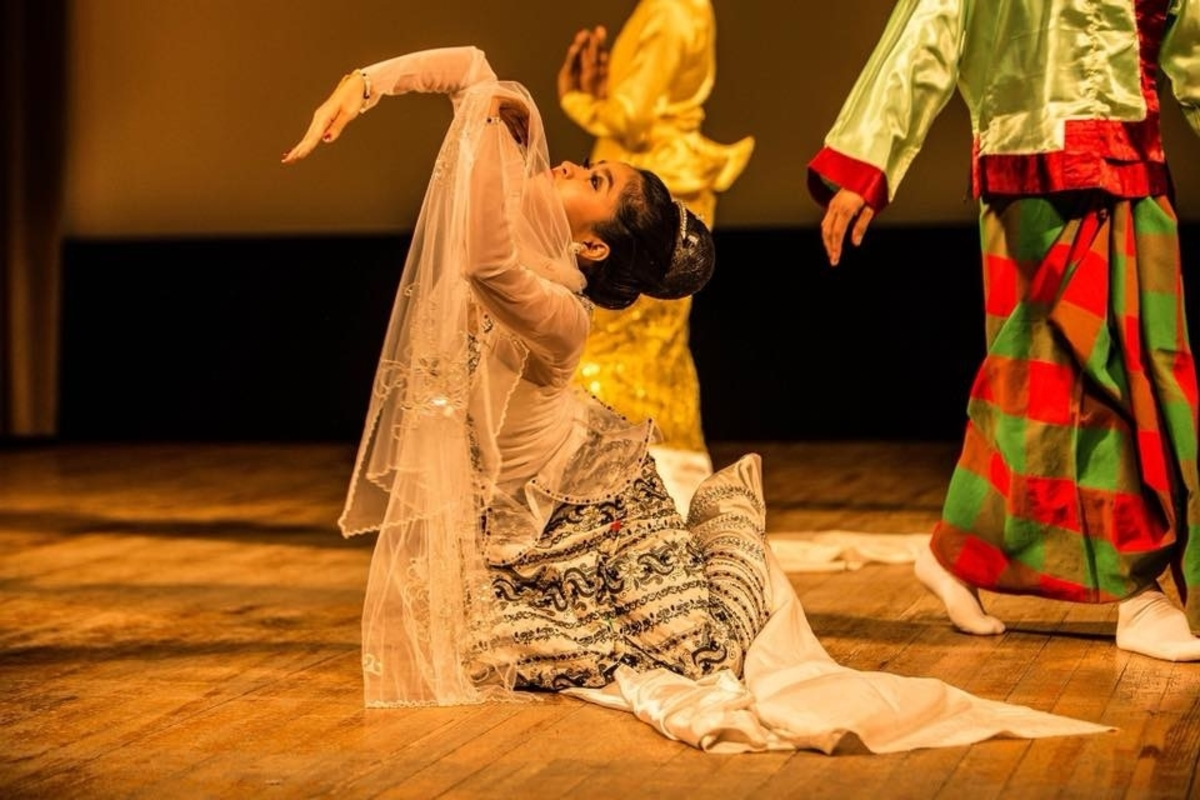
A descendant of Mandalay Thabin

The Mandalay Thabin (Burmese: မန္တလေးသဘင်) refers to the Mandalay-based dramatic arts industry, including yoke thé, anyeint, zat pwe, etc., flourished since the late Konbaung era, during the reigns of King Mindon and King Thibaw.

At first, Mandalay Thabin could be distinguished into Amyint Thabin (High Drama), which could be performed on a raised stage, including yoke thé and royal court dramas and Anyeint Thabin (Low Drama), which had to be displayed on the ground, called Myay Wine. After the abdication of King Thibaw, however, zat pwe and anyeint were developed when the royal troupes of Amyint Thabin were disbanded.

Since they are the descendants of courtiers, dancers from Mandalay are able to perform traditional dances well.

— a Burmese saying

== Early history ==
After the Burmese–Siamese War (1765–1767), the Siamese captives carried off from the Ayutthaya Kingdom, among whom were numerous Thai musicians and dancers, went on to have an important influence on traditional Burmese theatre and dance at the Amarapura court. Following the 1789 royal order of Crown Prince Shwedaung, a royal commission was charged with translating Siamese and Javanese dramas from Thai to Burmese. The translated Burmese versions were entitled Yama Zatdaw (adapted from the Ramakien) and Enaung Zattaw (from the Inao). These versions became the court dramas which only the royal dancers performed.

On the other hand, yoke thé enjoyed great popularity in the courts since the reign of King Singu, and thrived under royal patronage until the conquest of Upper Burma by the British in late 1885.

== First Thabin era ==
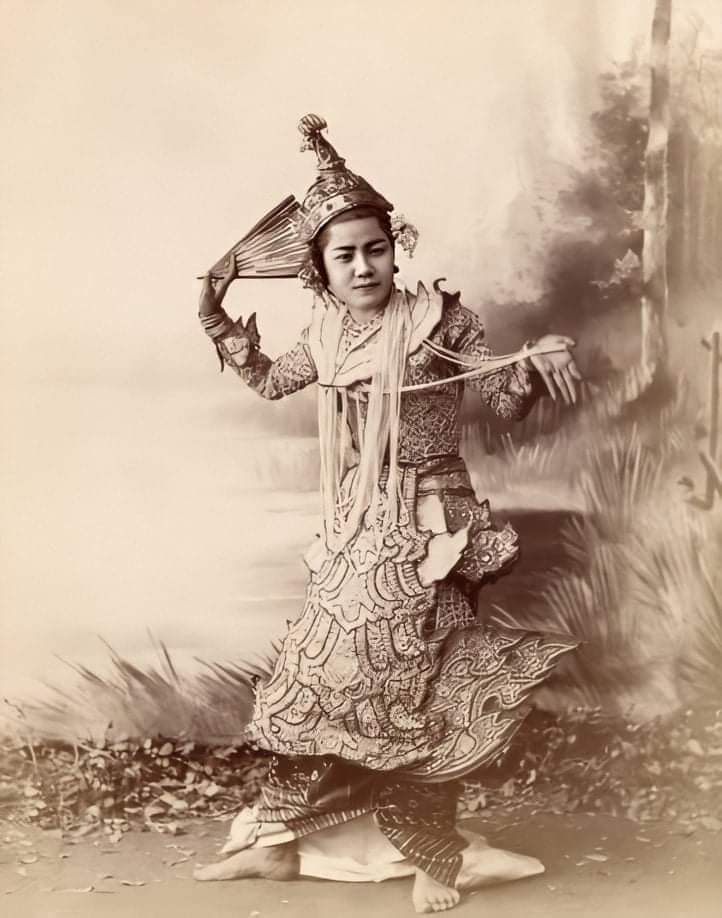
Yindaw Ma Lay as a Putzaba princess

The reigns of King Mindon and his son, King Thibaw when Yindaw Ma Lay, Sin Kho Ma Lay and Kun Ngon performed royal dramas could be marked in the history as the first Mandalay Thabin era or Yadanabon era.

Yindaw Ma Lay assumed leadership of the Grand Imperial Troupe, alongside Enaung Maung San Toke, until Supayalat ordered Sin Kho Ma Lay to lead the troupe. They both are regarded as the mothers of the first Mandalay Thabin.

Madhuthadda Shwedaung Kyawswa Phu Nyo was the popular puppeteer among the yoke thé musicians. As yoke thé accompanies hsaing waing, which is called the Yokthe hsaing, orchestral music industry continued to develop. Nemyo Bala Kyawgaung U Thar Gyin, a Hne musician, was well-known.

King Thibaw bestowed Deva Inda title on Maung Maung Gyi, a saung (harp) musician, who added the 14th string.

== Second Thabin era ==
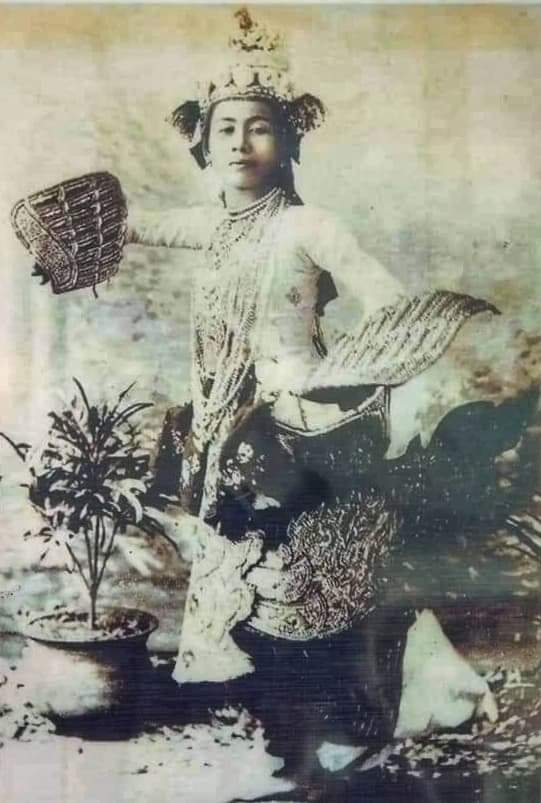
Ma Htwe Lay performing a Kinnari dance

After the end of the Konbaung dynasty in 1885, royal troupes were forced to seek work outside, and popularized a hybrid dance and comedic performance that has become popular throughout Burma, especially appealing to the growing merchant class in British Burma, who patronised and sponsored these performances.

Among them, Ma Htwe Lay was the leading dancer, and is said to be the mother of second Mandalay Thabin era. Learned traditional dramatics under Sin Kho Ma Lay and Yindaw Ma Lay, Ma Htwe Lay is held up as an ideal in the modern Burmese anyeint industry.

Initiated the transition from ground to stage performances by Ma Htwe Lay and her husband Phoe Kun, anyeint and zat troupes became to get the public's attention. The first known anyeint troupe was formed around 1900 by comedian Chit Phwe and his wife, dancer Sein Thone.

Aung Bala, a student of Ma Htwe Lay, was also well-known. He is said to be the only male artist in the whole time who can perform as a perfect female dancer.

In the hsaing music industry, Sein Beda was renowned.

== Third Thabin era ==
During the pre-World War II, Oba Thaung, Liberty Ma Mya Yin and Mya Chay Gyin Ma Ngwe Myaing were the most well-known. In the third era, famous anyeint dancers often became recording artists and were the headlines of anyeint shows, as composers such as Nandawshe Saya Tin, Myoma Nyein and A1 Saya Hnyar wrote individual songs and dances suited to them.

== Fourth Thabin era ==
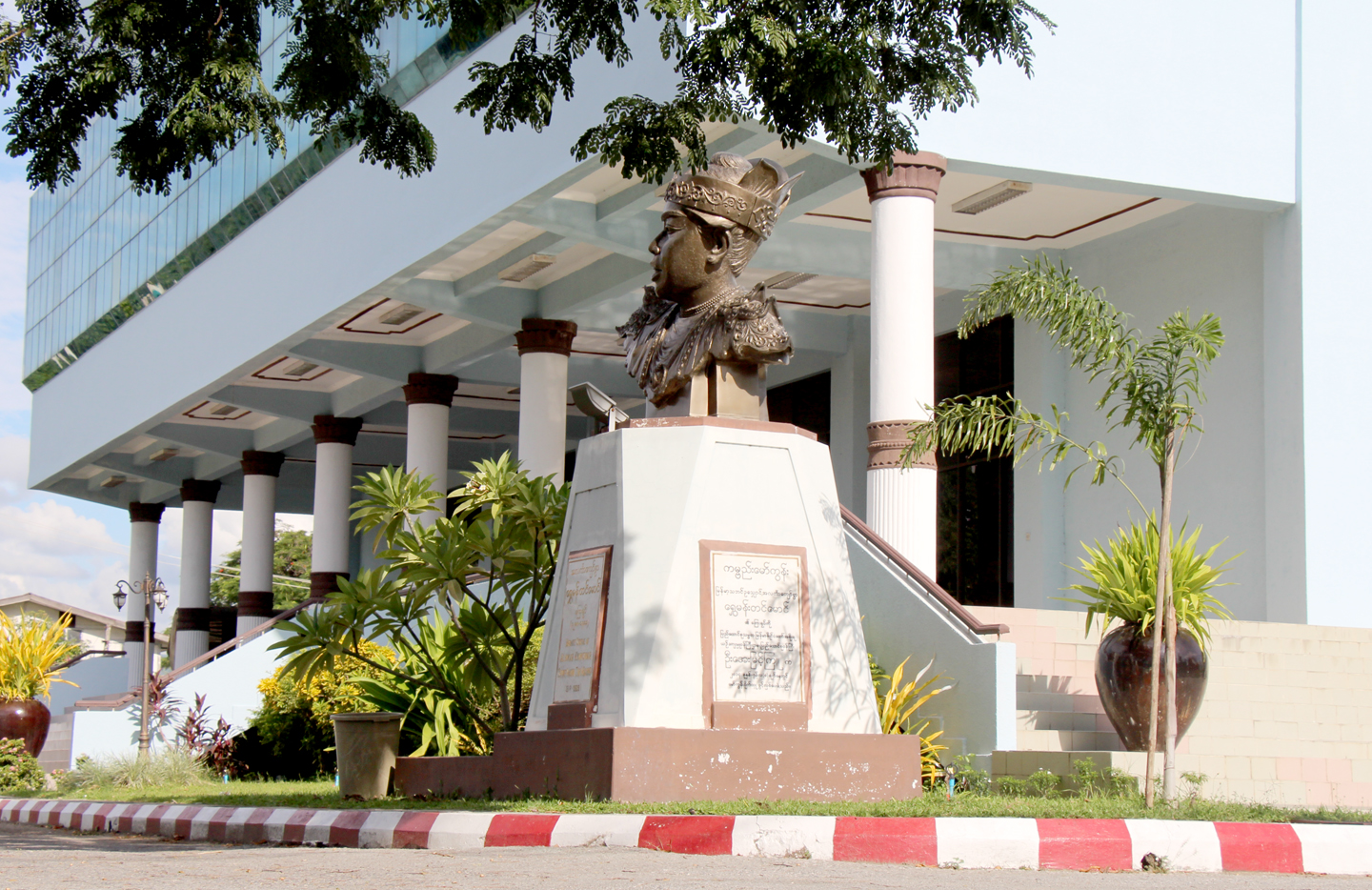
The bronze statue of Shwe Man Tin Maung

After independence from Britain in 1948, there was a period of strong Burmese cultural nationalism that resulted in the establishment of the State School of Music in Mandalay in 1953. Many well-known dancers and musicians such as Oba Thaung, Sein Mya Thwin and Sein Hla Maung tutored at the school.

Mya Chay Gyin Ma Ngwe Myaing's student Shwe Man Tin Maung was considered one of the three most skilled zat pwe performers of his day. Shwe Nan Tin, son of Nandawshe Saya Tin, was also a famous dancer.

== Modern era ==
Thein Zaw, Win Naung and Win Tha Pyay Tun are today's well-known dancers of Mandalay-based Thabin.

== See also ==
- Burmese dance
- Anyeint
