= Aung Bala =

Burmese dancer

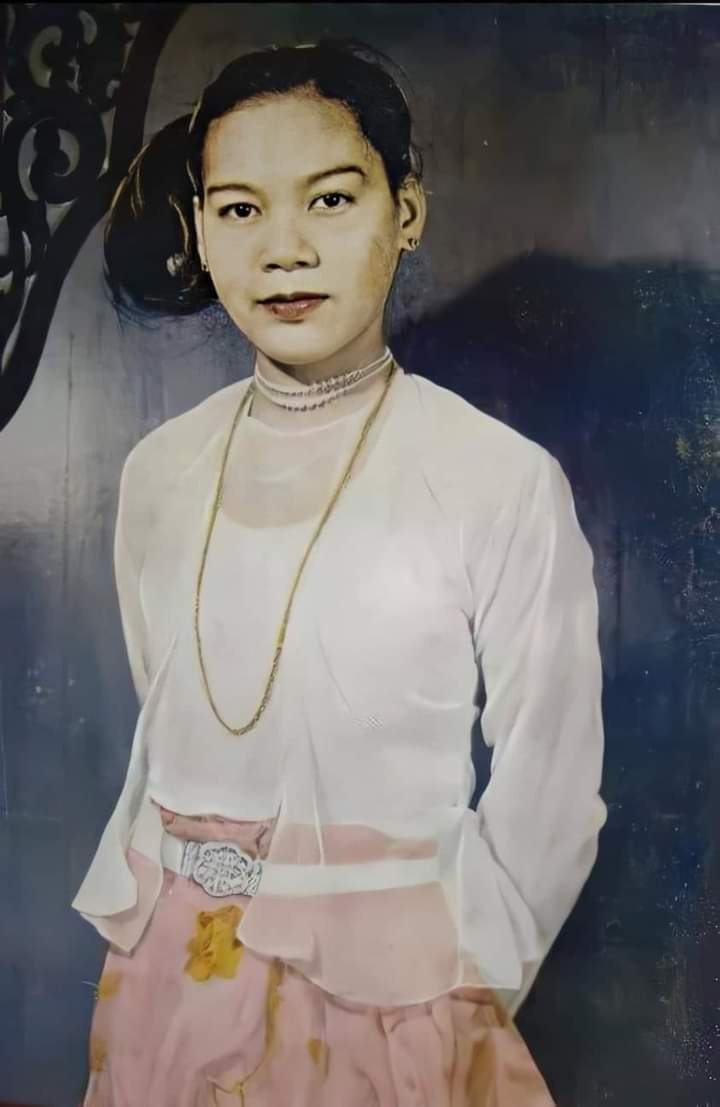
- Aung Bala as a female dancer
- Born: Aung Bala; February 18, 1883; Hsinpyukyun, Magwe Region
- Died: November 22, 1913 (aged 30); Mandalay
- Occupation: Burmese dancer
- Years active: 1893 – 1913
- Partners: Po Sein; Sein Gadone
- Career
- Dances: Toke kyoe dancing; Three-timing

Aung Bala (Burmese: အောင်ဗလ, pronounced [ʔɑʊɴ bələ̯]; 1883 – 1913) was an influential Burmese dancer during the early British colonial era of Burma. He was especially famous for playing female lead roles. He is said to have been the only male artist in the Burmese dramatic arts industry who could perfectly perform as a female dancer.

== Early life and career ==
Aung Bala, the youngest of four siblings, (Note: His elder brothers and sisters were San Tun Oo, Thin Ohn, and Thin Pon.) was born on 18 February 1883 in Hsinpyukyun, Magwe Region to U Lu Gyi, a puppeteer, and Me Pwint. His father died when he was six years old. He developed an interest in singing and dancing, and learned traditional dance from his uncle while he was a student, with his mother's permission.

Years later he became popular in the Hsinpyukyun area, performing at the local yein (choreographed group dance). He studied under Ma Htwe Lay in Mandalay and was the first to dance in the styles known as Toke Kyoe and three-timing (စည်းသုံးကြိုး ဝါးသုံးကြိုး). He collaborated with Sein Gadone and Po Sein; the latter was his most popular dancing partner, and their performance in the jataka opera Kākavalliya (1909) became their signature piece.

== Death and legacy ==
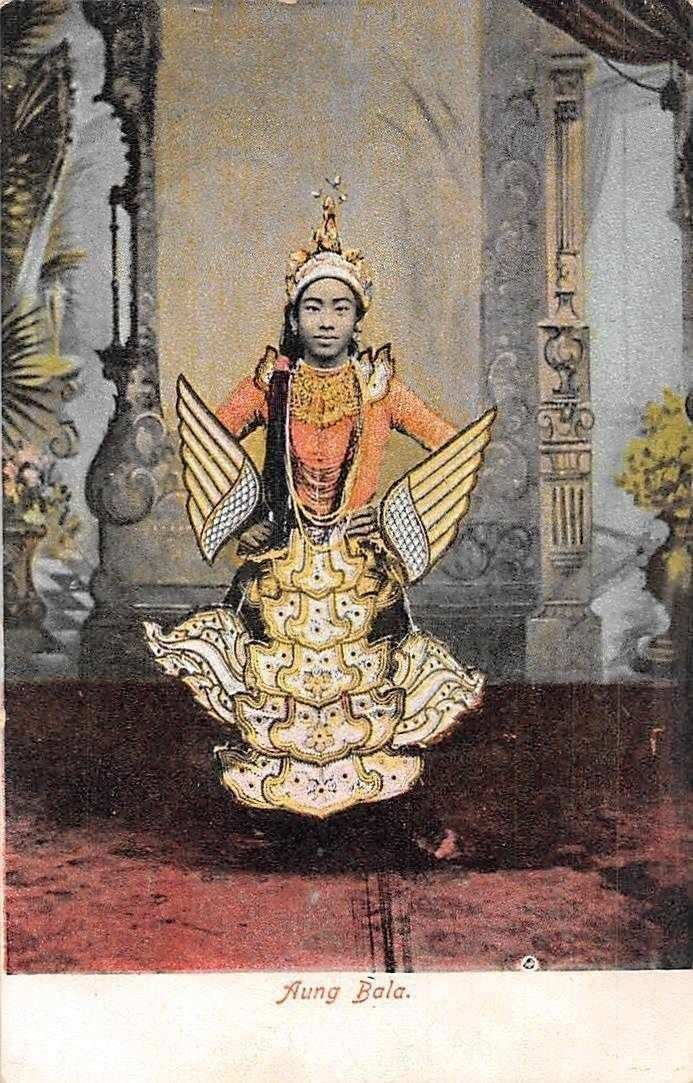
Aung Bala on a postcard

Aung Bala died on 22 November 1913 in Mandalay. The British government honored him with a cannon salute at his funeral. Many believed he was reborn as Bala Pyan, who was also a dancer.

The Aung Bala mont (အောင်ဗလမုန့်), a Burmese-style rice pancake topped with syrup, is named in honor of Aung Bala, as is a style of tin box.

== See also ==
- Burmese dance
- Anyeint
- Sin Kho Ma Lay
- Yindaw Ma Lay
- Awba Thaung
- Liberty Ma Mya Yin
- Mya Chay Gyin Ma Ngwe Myaing
