= Yindaw Ma Lay =

Burmese royal court dancer

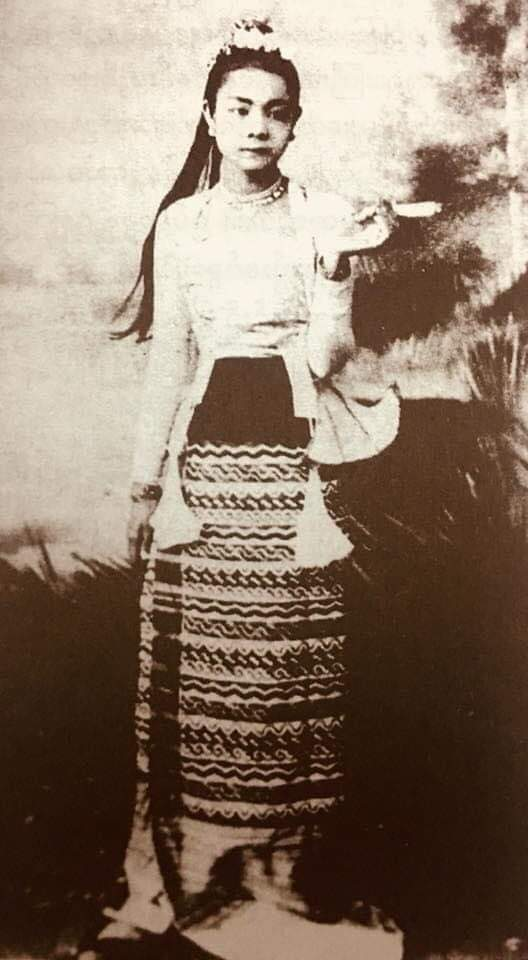
- Yindaw Ma Lay
- Born: 1846; Yindaw, Pyawbwe township, Mandalay
- Died: 1916 (aged 69–70)
- Occupation: Royal court dancer

Yindaw Ma Lay (Burmese: ယင်းတော်မလေး, pronounced [jɪ́ɰ̃dɔ̀ma̰lé]; 1846 – c. 1916) was a Burmese royal court dancer, best known during the late Konbaung era. Yindaw Ma Lay is said to be one of the two mothers of the Mandalay's first dramatic arts era along with Sin Kho Ma Lay, her only contemporary court dancer.

== Early life ==
Yindaw Ma Lay was born in 1846 at Yindaw. (Note: A town between Meiktila and Pyawbwe.) In 1862, she was sent to Mandalay, by the mayor of Yindaw, to serve as a royal anyeint preliminary dancer.

== Career as a royal dancer ==
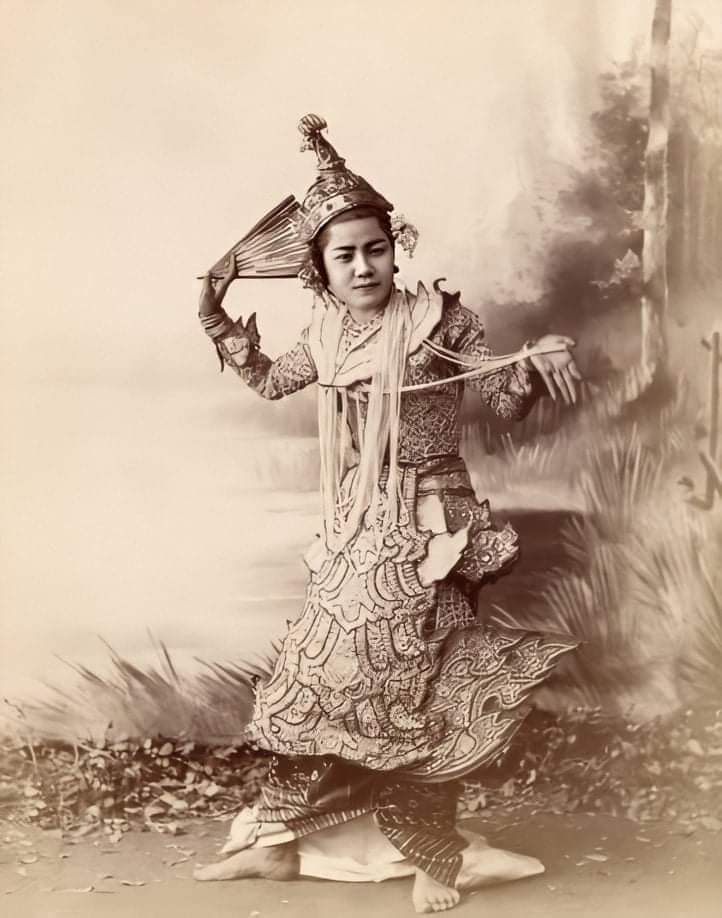
Yindaw Ma Lay as a Putzabar princess

She became a leading court dancer a year later, playing the role of Putzabar princess in Indrāvudha court drama together with Eenaung Mg San Toke. She soon became popular in the royal society. She received the appanage of Yindaw and was hence known as Yindaw Ma Lay (or Duchess of Yindaw).

In 1868 at the request of the Pegu commissioner, the Indrāvudha court drama team led by Yindaw Ma Lay was sent on a mission to perform the royal court drama for the 4th Viceroy of India and Governor-General Richard Bourke, 6th Earl of Mayo, while he was staying in Rangoon.

== Later life ==
After the abdication of King Thibaw in 1885 and since there were no major sponsors, the Indrāvudha court drama troupe was almost disbanded. However, because the wife of Taunggwin mayor supported them, the troupe could perform at ceremonies held in Mandalay.

Eight years after the abdication of King Thibaw, Yindaw Ma Lay went blind one eye. She remained poorly in her sixties. Although ageing, she still participated in some local dance troupes. Whenever she sung about the fall of her time of glory to lower status, all the audience felt sad for her.

No one in her generation inherited Yindaw Ma Lay's knowledge of Burmese royal dance, except Ma Htwe Lay, her pupil, who later became a popular dancer.

== See also ==
- Burmese dance
- Anyeint
- Aung Bala
- Awba Thaung
- Liberty Ma Mya Yin
- Mya Chay Gyin Ma Ngwe Myaing
