= Ma Htwe Lay =

Traditional Burmese dancer

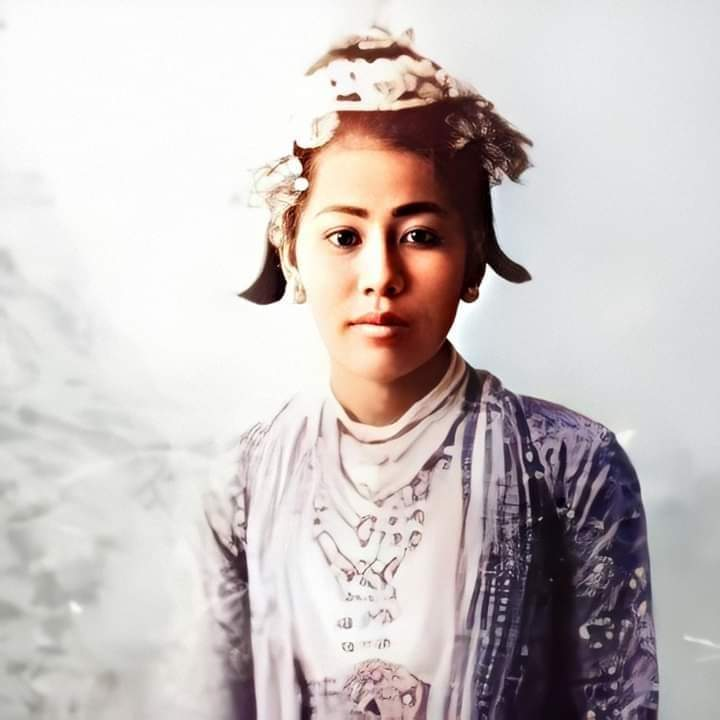
- Ma Htwe Lay
- Born: Khin Htwe; 1867; O-toke Kone village, Kyaukse, Burma
- Died: 1927 (aged 59–60); Inwa
- Occupation: Burmese traditional dancer
- Years active: 1879–1927
- Spouses: Maung Maung Toke; Phoe Kun; Eikin Mg Gyi; Kyar Nyo
- Career
- Dances: Kinnari; Marionette-style

Ma Htwe Lay (Burmese: မထွေးလေး; pronounced [mɑʔ tʰwé lé]; born Khin Htwe, 1867 – 1927) was a Burmese dancer in the tradition of Sin Kho Ma Lay and Yindaw Ma Lay. She is held up as an ideal in the modern Burmese anyeint industry, and is said to be the mother of Mandalay's second dramatic arts era.

== Early life ==
Ma Htwe Lay was born in 1867 in the village of O-toke Kone, Kyaukse, to Min Thiha, the Prince of Khasi and a grandson of Bodawpaya, and his consort Ma Ma Gyi. Although her given name was Khin Htwe, she was called Htwe Lay by Hsinbyumashin, Supayagyi and Supayalat, and that was the name she became generally known by.

== Career ==
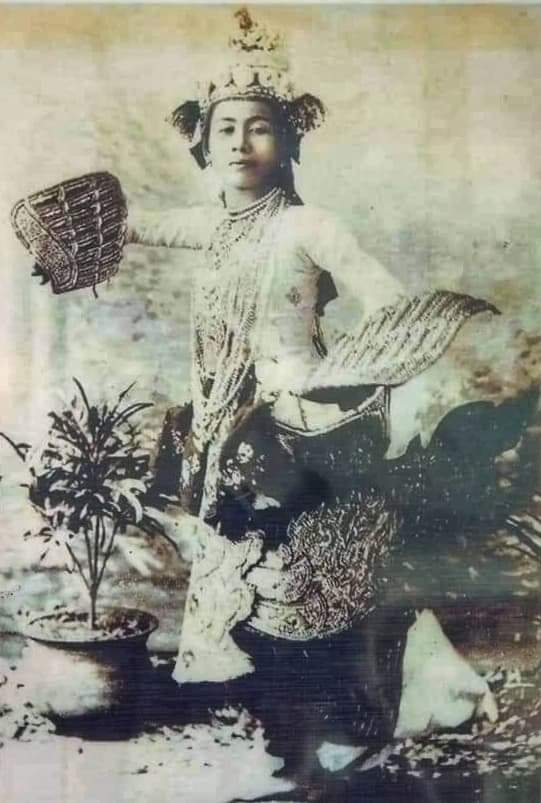
Ma Htwe Lay performing a Kinnari dance

She developed an interest in performing and began to learn traditional dancing at the age of 12, with her father's permission. She married Maung Maung Toke, the Prince of Yanaung, when she was 14 years old, and became a pupil of Sin Kho Ma Lay. She also studied both dancing and singing under Yindaw Ma Lay.

As she was not able to read or write, she was instructed in dictation by her mentors. She specialized in Kinnari and marionette-style dancing, and her Burmese anyeint singing was known for its tremulous musical flourishes (မေးရိုက်မေးဝဲ).

In 1886, Ma Htwe Lay married performer Phoe Kun. Her husband introduced her to Manusadda Shwedaung Saya Pu, from whom she learned more traditional dance techniques. Widowed once again a few years later, she married Eikin Mg Gyi and danced with him throughout Burma. When he died after fifteen years of marriage, she married U Kyar Nyo, who was chief of the village of Zeegan Taungbyone, Inwa.

Ma Htwe Lay's most famous role was as Pațācārī in the opera Ma Pațā and Mg Dāsa. Her performance of Patācārī descending into madness after the death of her parents, brother, husband, and children was very well known. Another popular performance was in Sudhanu Manoharī, particularly the scene of Manoharī Kinnari's return to Ngwedaung.

The transition from ground to stage performances was initiated by Ma Htwe Lay and her husband Phoe Kun. Most newcomers to anyeint in the British colonial era were her pupils, including Awba Thaung and Aung Bala. She died in 1927.

== Donations ==
As meritorious deeds for her husband Eikin Mg Gyi, Ma Htwe Lay donated a building to Thitseint Sayadaw and funded the construction of a pagoda in the compound of Mahākhemikārāma Thitseint monastery, at the foot of Mandalay hill.

== See also ==
- Burmese dance
- Anyeint
- Liberty Ma Mya Yin
- Mya Chay Gyin Ma Ngwe Myaing
