= List of Burmese Muslims =

Muslims arrived in Burma as travelers, adventurers, pioneers, sailors, traders, military personnel (voluntary and mercenary), and a number of them as prisoners of wars. Some were reported to have taken refuge from wars, monsoon storms and weather, shipwreck and for a number of other circumstances. Some are victims of forced slavery but many of them are professionals and skilled personnel such as advisors to the kings and at various ranks of administration whilst others are port-authorities and mayors and traditional medicine men. Burmese Muslims have been serving their adopted country in various positions.

== List of prominent Burmese Muslims ==
- Saya Gyi U Nu

Saya Gyi U Nu (Great Teacher or Guru; 1762–1822) Mayor of Yammar Watti, Shwe Taung Thargathu also known as Mohamed Kassim was a very famous Burmese Muslim writer during King Bodawpaya. He wrote or translated many Islamic religious books. He used Pali and other words and terms from the Burmese religious literature to Burmanise the Islamic literature. Combined with his flowery, poetic Burmese writing, his books are regarded as Myanmar Muslims’ classics. Bodawpaya appointed him as the head of the mission to India to collect and bring back books and Scriptures in Sanskrit, Hindi, Urdu and Persian. Saya Gyi U Nu was appointed as the Mayor of Yammar Wati with the Shwe Taung Tharga title. But recent military rulers prohibited the Muslims from using these Pali words and terms in Islamic religious books.

- U Razak

U Razak (20 January 1898 – 19 July 1947; Arabic: Abdul Razak) was a Burmese politician who was a respected educationalist. While his brothers and sisters chose to be Buddhists, he maintained the Muslim name Razak, in honor of his father. Being Nominally Muslim, Razak was a secularist who deeply loved Burma and encouraged unity in diversity. Razak initiated calls for unity between Burmese Muslims and Buddhists. He was a Muslim and maintained ties to Buddhism, educating himself on Pali, the sacred script of Theravada Buddhism, and helped found the Mandalay College (modern Mandalay University). Razak fathered three children. He was a minister at Aung Sann's pre-independence interim government and was assassinated, along with Aung San and other members, on 19 July 1947. July 19 is celebrated in Myanmar today as Martyrs' Day. U Razak was Minister of Education and National Planning, and was chairman of the Burma Muslim Congress.

- Wazir U Kan Gyi (1870–1960)

Educated in Bombay, Kanji made Burma his home and adopted the Burmese name Kan Gyi. He was given the title of Wazir by his Highness the Aga Khan. He was a wealthy, influential business man who devoted himself to social causes and philanthropy.

- Maung Thaw Ka or Major Ba Thaw

Maung Thaw Ka or Major Ba Thaw (1928–1991) from Navy was a very prominent writer and pioneer NLD leader died in SPDC jail. He was buried at Kandaw Gale Sunni cemetery.

- U Shwe Yoe aka U Ba Ga Lay

U Shwe Yoe (1890–1945) was a Burmese Muslim named, U Ba Ga Lay. He was the pioneer famous Cartoonist, Actor, Comedian and dancer

U Shwe Yoe dance was U Ba Ga Lay's jolly joker dance sequence in, "Ah Ba Yae" (Oh Ah Ba. Ah Ba means old man or father in Burmese) which was one of the pioneer films of Myanmar movie history about rural life. The dance is full of fun and joy and it appealed so much to the Myanmar audience and is adopted as a dance for all festive occasions.

- Colonel Ba Shin

Colonel Ba Shin a noted historian was later a member of The Myanmar History Commission, UTC and Islamic Religious Affairs Council.

- Tun Tun Min

Tun Tun Min is a Burmese Muslim Lethwei fighter, former Openweight Lethwei World Champion.

- Kyar Ba Nyein and family members

Kyar Ba Nyein was a Burmese Muslim Lethwei fighter who represented Burma in the 1952 Summer Olympic Games in Boxing. He successfully trained a lot of boxers and rejuvenated Myanmar traditional boxing.

- Win Nyein (the eldest son of Kyar (Tiger) Ba Nyein)

Win Nyein is a prominent writer and chief editor of the long-lasting Myanmar Literary Magazine "Shwe Ahmhutay".

- Myo Myint Nyein (the fourth son of Kyar Ba Nyein)

Myo Myint Nyein is the writer and editor of many Myanmar magazines and journals such as the Veterans Magazine in 1977, Pay-phoo-lwar magazine, the Ma-hay-the Magazine (1983), the Cinema Essence magazine (1984), the News Magazine (1984) and the News Journal (1985). He was active in democracy movements in 1988, worked as communication and information sector of National League for Democracy Party. He was imprisoned for 7 years in 1989 because he published a poem " What is happening" by Min Lu. He was unstoppable and kept working on freedom of expression in prison later his prison sentence was extended for seven more years. He was awarded of Freedom to Write Award by the Canadian Journalists for Freedom of Expression (CJFE) in 2001 and recognised as an honorary member of PEN International. He was released on 13 February 2002 under amnesty. He and his colleagues tried to take up Myanmar PEN center in 2013. He was elected as a board member and currently he is the President of PEN Myanmar Center. He publishes the Info-Digest bi-monthly news digest journal.

- Karim Ghani

Karim Ghani was born in Sothugudi, Ilayangudi, a politician in South-East Asia of Indian origin Karim Ghani. Before the Second World War Karim Ghani was a parliamentary secretary in Burma under Dr. Ba Maw.

- U Raschid

U Raschid, an Indian Myanmar Muslim, was active in the student movement against the ruling British. He was the first general secretary of the Rangoon University Students’ Union in 1931 together with prominent Myanmar political leaders: Aung San, U Nu, U Kyaw Nyein, U Ba Swe etc. U Nu was the first president of the Rangoon University Students Union (RUSU)in 1935-1936 with Mr. M. A. Rashid as Vice-President and U Thi Han as the General Secretary.

U Raschid was the president of the All Burma Students’ Union, while being concurrently president of the Rangoon University Students' Union in 1936 - 1937. Aung San was then vice-president. In 1952 U Nu appointed him as Minister for Housing and Labour, later in 1954, Minister for Trade and Development, in 1956, Minister of Mines, in 1960 Minister of Commerce and Industry. In 1958 he was the Vice President of the Trade Union Council of Burma. U Nu requested him to change his name to U Yanshin to make him more acceptable to other Buddhist but he declined. General Ne Win arrested him in 1962, during the coup.

- Kan Chun

Kan Chun @ Mohamad Omar is a Satirist, Journalist, Novelist, Cartoonist and Artist (Painter) from Mandalay, Burma. Born in Mandalay on 4 April 1946 from the parents U Ba Htay and Daw Aye Shwin. Died on 20 August 2009 in Mandalay.

- Hajima Pyinmanar (Sein) Daw Pu. Hajima Daw Pu was also a famous Myanmar-Muslim philanthropist. Because of her donation of a new Kidney Hospital and good social relations with General Ne Win, Military Government even awarded her with a medal for her outstanding social deeds.
- Sultan Mahmood (Health Minister)

Wealthy and influential Myanmar Muslim, Sultan Mahmood was the political secretary in U Nu's government and later was appointed as Health Minister.

- Other MPs (Member of Parliament)

Other Rohingya Myanmar Muslims in U Nu's Parliament as parliamentary secretaries were Mr Sultan Ahmed and Mr Abdul Gaffar. Mr Abdul Bashar, Mrs. Zohora Begum @ Daw Aye Nyunt, Mr Abdul Khair, Mr Abdus Sobhan, Mr Abdul Bashar, Mr Rashid Ahmed, Mr Nasiruddin (U Pho Khine), were members of Parliament in different terms in U Nu's Government.

- Colonel (Tat Hmu Gyi) U Pho Kar

He started to enlist in Mindon's Cannon regiment since young. During King Thibaw's reign, he was the Captain on the Sekyar Ngwezin Thulu ship which went to Bhamo to fight in the Sino-Burmese War.

During the third Anglo-Burmese war, he was at Min Hla Fort leading 200 Cannoners. U Pho Kar was together there with his uncles Captain Bo Kyae, Captain Bo U Maung, Sergeant (Thwe Thaut) U Kyar Yone. At the battle, one Captain and 50 soldiers killed. Burmese had to retreat and U Pho Kar retreated with the gunshot wound on the abdomen. After the war he settled in Maymyo. Parliamentarian Haji U Than Nyunt was his son. U Pho Kar died on 10 May 1956 at the age of 95.

- Ambassador U Pe Khin was the most important negotiator and architect of the historical Panglon treaty. Even General Aung San was disappointed, given up and decided to take the flight back to Rangoon that evening. U Pe Khin persuaded General Aung San to stay for one night and to allow him to negotiate with the Ethnic Minority leaders. U Pe Khin successfully negotiated with those Ethnic leaders to get an agreement for this most important treaty in Burma, which was the foundation for the Union of Burma and its Independence.
- Myanmar Muslim activists
- U Aung Thin represented the Myanmar Muslims at the Round Table Committee on whether Burma should be separated from India or not. That was held at London, in 1930.
- Ko Ni

Ko Ni (1953–2017) was a lawyer and an expert on constitutional law.

== Notable Burmese Muslims under Burmese Kings ==
All the list of persons below are taken from the "Twentieth Anniversary Special Edition of Islam Damma Beikman." Myanmar Pyi and Islamic religion. The reprint of the records of the lectures given by Pathi U Ko Lay in 1973. from page 109,110 and 111

- Naymyo Gonnayap Khan Sab Bo @ Abdul Karim Khan. Ambassador to Indochina.
- Minister Mingyi Maha Min Htin Yar Zar @ U Chone, Akhbad Myin Wun, cavalry Captain, Mayor of Pin Lae town.
- Maha Min Kyaw Thiha Min Htin @ U Pho Yit, Mayor of Tapae town.
- Min Hla Min Htin Yarzar @ U Nae Htun, Kala Won.
- Maha Bawga Dana Thiri Yarzar Mulla Ismail(a)Min Hla Maung Maung, Custom Chief. Royal Ship Captain, Mayor of Kyauk Yae town. He donated the Mandalay Soorti Mosque and is buried there. Minhla town named after him by King Thebaw. Later became Minister for taxation to King Thebaw. The British also gave him title of Khan Bahadur.
- Maha Min Hla Min Htin Yarzar @ U Naw Khan, Kalay Tain Nyin Yargazo Mayor.
- Maha Min Khaung Kyaw Htin @ U Pyar, Mayor of Sinku.
- Malar Mon @ U Pwint, Explosive expert. (Yan Chet won)
- Min Hla Min Htin Thu Rain, Western Jail Superintendent.
- Min Htin Yarzar, Chief Clerk.
- Nay Myo Thiha Kyaw Htin @ U Tar, Advocate.
- Nay Myo Yaza Thinkhayar @ Marmet Ebrahim, Advocate.
- Nay Myo Yaza Thinkhaya @ Abdul Rahman, Advocate.
- Nay Myo Min hla Yazar Thu @ U Kyin Oo, Special squad Captain. (Ywe Let Yar Bo)
- Min Htin Thithi Yarzar @ U Khaung, Special squad Captain.
- Maha Thu wunna Thaetha @ U Yan Aung. (Rich man)
- Maha Thiri Thukha Thaetha @ Maung Sein. (Rich man)
- Mantaka Maha Thala @ U San Pyaw (Richman)
- Maha Bawga Punnya @ U Yit (Rich-man)
- Abit Shah Husaini, Chief Islamic Judge (Bodaw).
- Malauvi Kabul, Chief Islamic Judge (Mindon)
- Naymyo Gonnayat @ Khalifa U Pho Mya
- Khalifa U Hwe Lone.
- Royal ship Captain U Pho Mya.
- Bo Min Setkyar Amyoke Tat U Hashim.
- Bo Min Bone Oh Bengla Amyoke Tat, U Yauk.
- Thwe Thauk Gyi (Major of 275 soldiers, Head of 5 Thwe Thauks who had 55 soldiers each under them) Thwe Thauk Gyi of Cannon brigade U Bo. (I could not mention the few dozens of Thwe Thauk Gyis because of limited space)
- Setkyar (Amyoke Tat) Cannon brigade Chief Officer, U Pho Kar.
- Custom Chief, Ar Gar Sherazi (Shia Muslim)
- Price Controller, U Maw.
- Merchant U Shwe Thi.
- Horse Cavalry Chief Captain, Wali Khan.
- Horse Cavalry Captain U Tu Wa, Wali Khan Horse Cavalry.
- Thibaw's personal secretary, U Mulla Hashim.
- Thwe Thauk Gyi (Major) U Danaing (Kindar Kala Pyo Army) Grandfather of Pathi U Ko Ko Lay.
- There are many Thwe Thauk Gyis, Captains and Palace Ladies closed to the queen.

== See also ==
- Burmese Indians
- Chinese people in Myanmar
- Islam in Myanmar
- Panthays
- Rohingya people
