= Sin Kho Ma Lay =

Burmese dance performer (1852-1930)

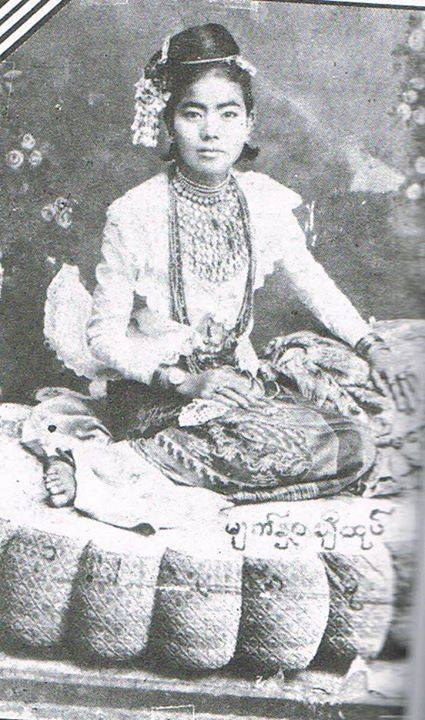
- Sin Kho Ma Lay c. 1870
- Born: Ma Hmyin; 1852; Burma
- Died: 1930 (aged 78)
- Occupation: Royal court dancer
- Spouse(s): Le Daw Oak of Taungdwingy; Prince of Yanaung; Maung Ba
- Children: Nyar Bwar and Thet Hter (with Le Daw Oak); Htwe Tin (with Maung Ba); Ma Pu (adopted)

Sin Kho Ma Lay (Burmese: ဆင်ခိုးမလေး, pronounced [sʰɪ̀ɰ̃ɡóma̰lé]; lit. 'the little maid carried away on an elephant'; born Ma Hmyin; 1852 – 1930) was a Burmese court dancer, best known during the late Konbaung era.

She was so favoured by the Chief Queen Supayalat that a royal verbal order came out in those days that there should be no court dancers in the country other than Sin Kho Ma Lay. Her only contemporary court dancer was Yindaw Ma Lay who led the royal court dramas prior to her. They both are said to be the mothers of the Mandalay's first dramatic arts era.

== Biography ==
=== Early life ===
Ma Hmyin, the eldest of five siblings, (Note: Her four younger brothers were Ko Yin Gyi, Ko Yin Galay, Ko Kyauk Lone and Ko Phoe Thu Taw.) was born in 1852 at Taungdwingyi. She developed an interest in traditional dance, and being a talented one, she became a well-known Myaywine (Note: Myanmar dance and drama of olden times performed on the ground with audience around it.) dancer in the vicinity of Taungdwingyi, at the age of 12. At the age of 19, she married a royal paddy-field administrator (Le Daw Oak) of Taungdwingyi, and gave birth to two sons: Nyar Bwar and Thet Htar.

=== Career as a royal dancer ===
When she arrived at Mandalay to continue studying royal-dance lessons, a powerful and ruthless Prince of Yanaung took her as one of his wives. Yanaung Prince raised her honor up. Even though he had six legal wives, Sin Kho Ma Lay was the house treasurer. Their son died at his young age. More than six years after their marriage, Prince of Yanaung was enraged by the Chief Queen Supayalat due to his involvement in the case of King Thibaw and Daing Khin Khin, and suicided himself at the prison. When her husband died, Sin Kho Ma Lay had to be learned Yodaya (Thai) dance under trainer U Bo Mya for three years, with Supayalat's permission. Eventually, she became the leading dancer of royal Indrāvudha court drama, replacing Yindaw Ma Lay.

Years later, she married Le Daw Oak again. However her husband died shortly after their marriage. After the abdication of King Thibaw in 1885, many royal dancers moved to Yangon for their needs, including Sin Kho Ma Lay. In Yangon, she married Maung Ba, ward elder of Kyimyindaing, and born to Mg Htwe Tin. As she had no daughter, she adopted her niece named Ma Pu.

=== Later life ===
In 1910, Sin Kho Ma Lay went to Ratnagiri to perform royal drama at the ear-boring ceremony of the four daughters of King Thibaw. She received the honorarium 0.15-viss gold coins. When she arrived at her native town, Taungdwingyi, a traditional dance troupe was founded with her family but disbanded after some time. Since then, the old Sin Kho Ma Lay became a hawker selling sandalwood for her livelihood at Minhla.

Surviving as a poor hawker, Sin Kho Ma Lay died in 1930, at the age of 78.

== Etymology ==
Her artist-name Sin Kho Ma Lay literally means "the little maid carried away on an elephant". It is said that she was carried away by Prince of Yanaung on the elephant to marry him. From that time on, whenever she performed dancing, she herself and the audience used the name Sin Kho Ma Lay.

== See also ==
- Burmese dance
- Anyeint
- Ma Htwe Lay
- Aung Bala
- Awba Thaung
- Liberty Ma Mya Yin
- Mya Chay Gyin Ma Ngwe Myaing
