= Kan Chun =

- ကံချွန်
- Born: 4 April 1946; Mandalay
- Died: 20 August 2009 (aged 63); Mandalay
- Known for: Painting, Cartoon

Kan Chun (Burmese: ကံချွန်, pronounced [kàɰ̃ tɕʰʊ̀ɰ̃]; 4 April 1946 – 20 August 2009) was a Burmese satirist, journalist, novelist, cartoonist and painter from Mandalay, Burma (Myanmar). He was a prolific cartoonist and writer; he published 73 books. He died in August 2009 of cancer.

== Early life ==
Kan Chun was born in Mandalay on 4 April 1946 to Aye Shwin and Ba Htay, a Burmese Muslim family. He had two brothers, Bo Maung and Hla Win. He attended the Mandalay 3 High School. After high school, he went on to study arts at the School of Fine Arts, Mandalay where he learned painting and cartooning from Win Maung, Kan Nyunt, Chit Mye, Aye Kyaw, Ba Thet and Aung Khin.

== Career ==
Kan Chun began his artistic career after college. His first published cartoon was in the Hanthawaddy, a daily paper in October 1969. He quickly became a successful cartoonist, with his works regularly appearing in all the major dailies of the day—The Botataung, Kyemon, and The Working People's Daily, as well as in magazines and journals like Shudaung, Thadin, Moe Wai, Cherry, Mahaythi, Kalya, Life Style, Idea, etc.

He also directed the commemorative documentary for the 100th anniversary of Liberty Ma Mya Yin, a pre-war Mandalay-based Anyeint dancer.

== Books written ==
- Modern Student, 1988
- Golden Jubilee of Love and Other Short Stories, 1990
- One Step of Thought
- Humour Salad
- Humour in the Clinic
- Market Economy Concepts
- Humorous Love
