= Gitameit =

Music school in Yangon, Myanmar

Gitameit Music Institute
- ဂီတမိတ် ဂီတသင်တန်းကျောင်း

Location
- Yankin Township, Yangon; Myanmar
- Coordinates: 16.83962155935032°N 96.16693538844886°E

Information
- Former name: Gitameit Music Center
- Type: Music
- Established: 2003
- Founders: Kit Young, Bruce Gaston, Moe Naing, Tin Yi
- Language: Burmese
- Website: Gitameit on Facebook

The Gitameit Music Institute (Burmese: ဂီတမိတ် ဂီတသင်တန်းကျောင်း) is a non-profit music school and community centre in Yankin Township, Yangon, Myanmar. The school offers holistic music programs that incorporate the study of western music genres and traditional and folk Burmese music. Gitameit also houses one of the country's largest musical archives, including digital copies of phonograph records. The school maintains a two-year "teaching artist" program with the University of Washington.

== History ==
In 2003, pianist Kit Young, Bruce Gaston, and Burmese colleagues Moe Naing and Tin Yi, founded Gitameit Music Center in Yangon, to foster a supportive community of local musicians and audiences, and to foster collaboration with the global community. The school's founding helped to fulfill demand for music education in the country, where limited options, such as the National University of Arts and Cultures in Yangon and Mandalay, are available.

On 25 February 2017, a new three-storey building was inaugurated to house the Yangon campus. Gitameit launched Myanmar's first secular men's and women's choir, Gitameit Voices. A new campus in Mandalay opened c. 2017.

== See also ==
- Music of Myanmar
- Inwa School of Performing Arts
