= Bala Pyan =

Burmese dancer

Aka Weizza Bala Pyan
- Born: Saw Nan Shwe (စောနန်းရွှေ); Ma Sein Mya (မစိမ်းမြ); June 27, 1914; Bago Township, Pegu Division, Burma
- Died: 1987 (aged 72–73); Yangon, Burma
- Occupation: Burmese dancer
- Known for: Sandawgyein dancing

Bala Pyan (Burmese: ဗလပြန်, pronounced [bəla̰ bjàɰ̃]; born Saw Nan Shwe; 27 June 1914 – 1987) was a 20th-century Burmese Aka Weizza (lit. 'dance expert') (Note: Weizza designates an expert in a particular branch of knowledge or skill.) who invented the Sandawgyein Aka (lit. 'standard time dance'). She was believed to be the reincarnation of Aung Bala, who was also a dancer.

== Early life ==
Saw Nan Shwe (in Karen tradition), or Sein Mya (in Bamar tradition), was born on 27 June 1914 in Yaeayesan Village, Htonegyi Village Tract, Bago Township, Pegu Division to U Chan Aye and Naw Shwe Mi. She became interested in singing and dancing, and began learning traditional dance under Shwegon, a myay wine (Note: Burmese traditional dance and drama performed on the ground in the middle of the audience.) dancer, as well as from Ba Maung, a zat saya, (Note: Male lead dramatic performer.) and his wife Zawbyan (Note: Zawbyan was famous for performing the zawgyi dance; she was so flexible that she could put her legs on her shoulders while dancing.) in Mandalay.

== Career as a dancer ==
She started performing alongside Burma Sein and Naypyidaw Ba Thet when she was sixteen. Her best known partners were Sein Aung Min and Aung Maung. The Saopha of Hsipaw, Sao Kya Ohn, recognized her performance in the kinnara by awarding her, along with Bo Kay Sein, two silver swords and a silver bowl.

She was honored with a gold medal and the title of Aka Weizza by Colonel Tun Sein of the socialist government for introducing a new dance into yoke thé shows in which the dancers imitated the movements of the marionettes. In 1969–1970 she introduced the Sandawgyein with partner Sein Aung Min.

== Later years ==
Her final partner was Pantya Kyi Lin. She tutored at the Ministry of Culture in the cultural department and performed the bird-crooning dance in kinnara yein, raising the standard for yein dance. Along with Shwe Man Tin Maung and Sein Aung Min, she was sent on cultural exchange tours to China and Vietnam.

She died in 1987 in Yangon.

== Works ==
Her best known performances with Sein Aung Min were Ngamo Yeik, Yaza Thingyan, Min Nyi Naung, Maung Missaka and Wizaya Kumma. With Aung Maung she performed Maha Paduma, Pabe Maung Tintte, Tanoyakkha and Thudhanu Medawi. She was also known for her performance of Min Kutha, Patikkhaya and Udari Kumari.

== Relationship to Aung Bala ==
U Chan Aye and Naw Shwe Mi became close to Aung Bala during a pagoda festival in Bago. He told them that he wanted to adopt their son, Shwe Zan, and novitiate him, but died before the plan could be carried out. Many believed that he was reincarnated as their daughter, Bala Pyan.
