= Bruce Gaston =

Bruce Gaston may refer to:

- Bruce Gaston (American football) (born 1991), American football player from Illinois
- Bruce Gaston (musician) (1947–2021), expatriate American musician in Thailand
