= Liberty Ma Mya Yin =

Burmese dancer and singer

Liberty Mya Yin
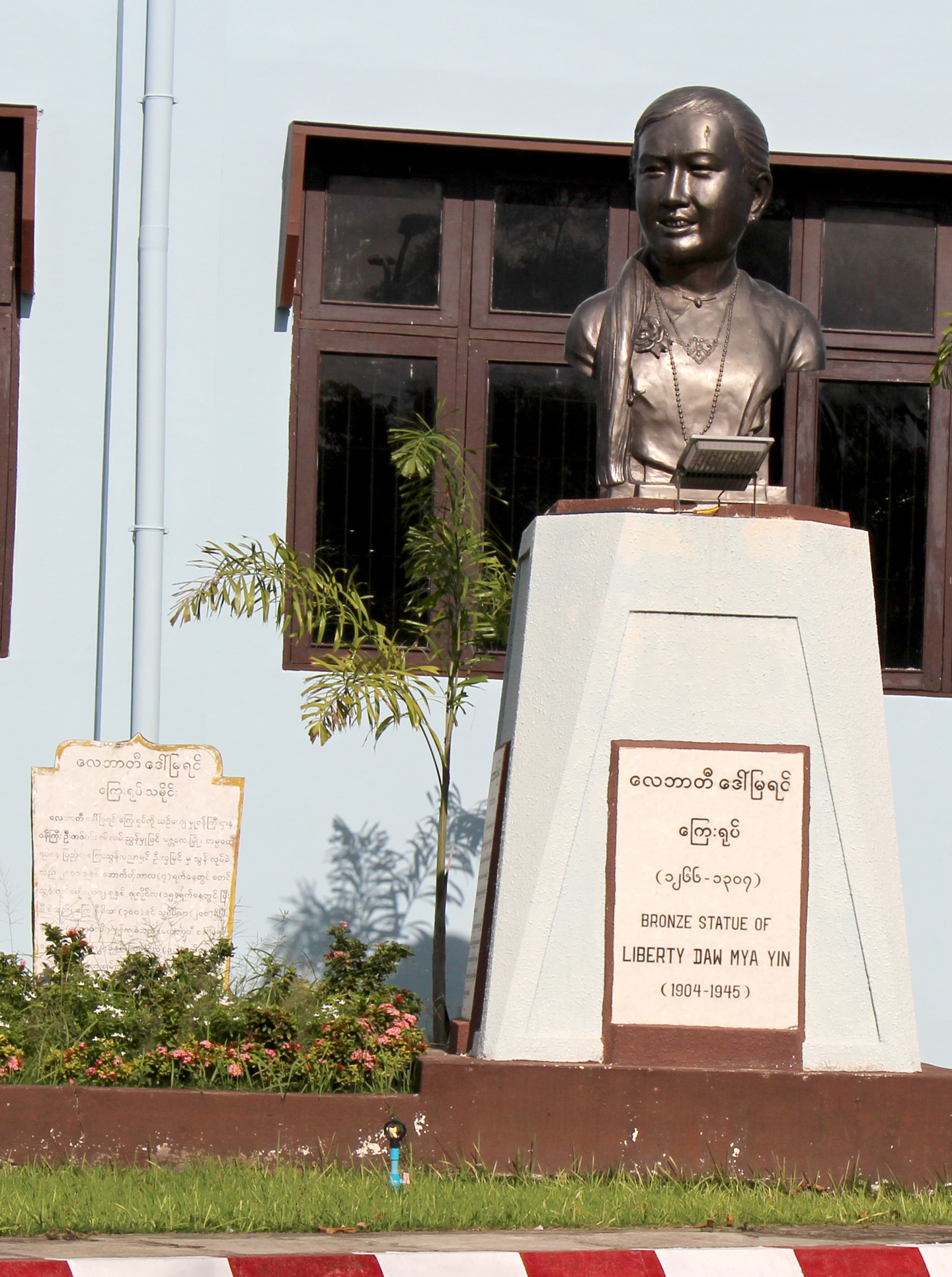
- Bronze bust at the National Theatre of Mandalay
- Born: Mya Yin c. 21 April 1904 c. Thursday, 8th waxing of Kason 1266 ME (Note: Only Mya Yin's birth year, 1266 ME (16 April 1904 to 15 April 1905), is publicly known. But based on her known death date (4th waning of Kason 1307 ME, or 29 April 1945) and age at death (41), her birth date can be narrowed down to between 16 April 1904 (New Year's Day of 1266 ME) and 2 May 1904 (4th waning of Kason 1266 ME). Furthermore, because her name Mya Yin suggests she was born on a Thursday, she was likely born on one of the two Thursdays in the period: 21 April 1904 (8th waxing of Kason 1266 ME) or 28 April 1904 (full moon of Kason 1266 ME).); Shwephalakan Village, Thazi Township, British Burma
- Died: 29 April 1945 (aged 41); Sunday, 4th waning of Kason 1307 ME; Epya Village, Sintgaing Township, British Burma
- Known for: Burmese dance, Anyeint
- Spouse: U Maung Galay

Liberty Mya Yin (Burmese: လေဘာတီမြရင်; c. 21 April 1904 – 29 April 1945) was a Burmese anyeint dancer and singer, best known during the pre-World War II period. She gained the moniker "Liberty" from college fans who advocated Burmese independence.

== Life ==
Mya Yin was born to Po Thit and Nyanyon, who were both traditional dancers, c. 21 April, 1904 in Shwepalagan Village, Thazi Township (now Wundwin Township), British Burma. She started her dancing career at the age of 14. (Note: 15, per Burmese age reckoning -- i.e. in her 15th year) Awba Thaung was one of her contemporaries.

She was married to U Maung Galay, a wealthy businessman and MP in the Legislative Council of Burma.

== Later career ==
Mya Yin's popularity was universal, including the general public, government officials and the elite. At one point, her anyeint had to be booked and partially paid for a year in advance, and donors needed to choose their days depending on when she was free. Her fans included Sir Joseph Augustus Maung Gyi and U Thant.

She performed hundreds of songs; some of the best known were "Tohn-kyaw Ma", "U Thawun-Kyaung", "Ahlushin" and "Shwe Pyi Soe". She also produced gramophone records, including "Moonlight Glory", "Padonma Shwe-Kya", "Khint Thabaw", "Maung Maung's Shwekye", "Htin Thalohn" and "Okay, Seik-Tagu Yok-Koze".

== Death and legacy ==
Mya Yin died on 29 April 1945 of malaria while fleeing conflict in Burma during World War II. She was 41. (Note: Her age at death is reported as 42 in Myanmar, following Burmese age reckoning -- i.e. in her 42nd year.)

In recognition of her prominence as a Burmese artist, a bronze statue of her stands before the National Theatre of Mandalay.

== See also ==
- Burmese dance
- Anyeint
- Sin Kho Ma Lay
- Yindaw Ma Lay
- Ma Htwe Lay
- Aung Bala
- Awba Thaung
- Mya Chay Gyin Ma Ngwe Myaing
