= Inwa School of Performing Arts =

Performing arts school in Mandalay

Inwa School
- အင်းဝ-မြန်မာအကသင်တန်းကျောင်း

Location
- Mandalay; Myanmar
- Coordinates: 21.976261552907467°N 96.11939650451428°E

Information
- Type: Performing arts
- Established: 2013
- Language: Burmese
- Affiliation: Arts Mandalay Foundation
- Website: Inwa School of Performing Arts on Facebook

The Inwa School of Performing Arts (Burmese: အင်းဝ-မြန်မာအကသင်တန်းကျောင်း) is a vocational training school in Mandalay teaching traditional Burmese dance along with English, Math, and professional arts skills. Children from all parts of Myanmar are eligible for scholarships and to train for the school's professional troupe which performs at Mandalay's Mahamuni Buddha Temple and the Mintha Theater as well as festivals like the Asian Youth Theater Festival.

== History ==
The school was founded in 2013 by a group of Mandalay-area artists with financial and logistical support from the Arts Mandalay Foundation and Los Angeles photographer David Heath. Heath cites his interest Burmese zat pwe, a traditional dance form for storytelling, for his motivation to preserve and revitalize the artform. The Suu Foundation helped found the school to preserve disappearing traditional arts and provide opportunities for rural children interested in the arts and traditional culture of Myanmar.

== Curriculum ==
Students of high-school age are instructed in the classical Burmese performing arts (dance, classical singing, classical Myanmar musical instruments, and theater). The curriculum also includes a strong program in English language, Myanmar literature, and math, in part through a cross-training agreement with the Phaung Daw Oo Monastic School nearby in Mandalay.

The dance curriculum follows a modified form of the strict regimen developed by the famous instructor Oba Thaung in the 1950s at the Mandalay State High School for the Arts (Pantya). This includes 125 discrete dance sequences that become the basis for stage improvisations during Myanmar rituals and festivals. It usually takes a minimum of two years of training to learn this repertoire. The school also trains the Mahāgīta, a corpus of Myanmar traditional songs that was cultivated by the royal courts over a period of many centuries, going back to the Pyu and Mon dynasties. Students are also taught a threatened vocal repertoire known as naugh’ pain which accompanies thousand-year-old morality plays and female dirge singing, which is central to traditional funerals of high-ranking monks. The school issues a certificate in the arts after successful completion of two years of training.

Students also perform around the country in rural and minority areas, including Kachin State.
