= Shwe Yoe =

- ရွှေရိုး
- Born: Ba Galay; 9 February 1890; Bassein, British Burma
- Died: 5 June 1945 (aged 55); Burma
- Occupation: Cartoonist
- Known for: Innovating the U Shwe Yoe dance
- Spouses: Khin Khin; Khin Hta
- Parent(s): Bo Thin; The Hmone

U Shwe Yoe (Burmese: ရွှေရိုး, pronounced [ʃwè jó]; born Ba Galay) was a prominent Burmese actor, comedian, dancer and cartoonist. He was a Burmese Muslim.

== U Shwe Yoe and Daw Moe dance ==
He became famous with the Shwe Yoe the jolly joker dance routine which first appeared in 1923 film Ah Ba Ye, an early Burmese language film about rural life. The dance routine was a hit with the audiences, and was soon adopted as a standard dance in many festive occasions. With thick eyebrows, long curved moustache, traditional Burmese headdress, the gaung baung, long scarf around the neck, traditional Burmese jacket taikpon, checked long sarong Taung Shae Pasoe and the small Pathein umbrella. This became the trademark of Shwe Yoe. Later the dancers easily copied his image by using special comical sunglass with artificial plastic nose and eyebrows.

The U Shwe Yoe dance has become an essential part of charitable and other traditional Burmese ceremonies. The performer in the U Shwe Yoe character dances to the music of the traditional Burmese music troupes, twirling his traditional Burmese-style umbrella. This dance is always performed to make amusement by village lads in procession at festivals. This popular traditional Burmese dance is presented with delightful and humorous movements to please spectators. It is also a standard routine at pagoda festivals, Shinpyu ordination ceremonies, and other festive occasions. Burmese folk dances developed together with folk music and songs. So they are inseparably linked to folk music and songs. These three performing arts are complementary.

Originally Shwe Yoe was a solo performer, but over time the Daw Moe Dance was created and appended to the original version. Now the art form is popularly known as the U Shwe Yoe and Daw Moe Dance. The U Shwe Yoe character dances with his comic moustache and comic movements trying to woo the spinster Daw Moe character. The Shwe Yoe Dance has been an essential part of charitable and traditional ceremonies. U Shwe Yoe and Daw Moe are the comic characters. They sing, they dance and they flirt, and make the spectators laugh. The dance is presented with humour in order to make the spectators merry and gay. No religious procession is considered complete without the dance of U Shwe Yoe and Daw Moe.

== Acting career ==
Over a 12-year period, Shwe Yoe starred in 18 movies, 15 of which were silent films. His first movie “Taw Myaing Soon Ka Lwan Aung Phan” was one of the earliest Burmese films, produced by the Myanma Ahsway Film Company. Lead actor was Nyi Pu (first Burmese actor) and actress was Mya Nyunt. Shwe Yoe was a supporting actor in a comedic role. There was a scene in the movie, Daw Moe wanted to be splashed with water in the water festival but pretended not to be. He acted as a naive old man Shwe Yoe, trying to splash water with a short pump. In his second movie he rose to fame with his Shwe Yoe dance.

He later made another eight films with the same film company.

== Filmography ==
- Taw Myaing Soon Ka Lwan Aung Phan, 1923
- Ah Ba Ye, 1923
- Pauk Kyaing, 1924
- Ta Khaing Lone Shwe, 1924
- Ta Khaing Lone Sein, 1924
- Mhaing Wai Wai, 1925
- Pa Loke Toke Toke Sakya Shin, 1925
- Village Boy Shwe Yoe, 1926
- Shwe Min Won, 1926
- Where is Shwe Yoe, 1926
- Shwe Yoe and San Phae, 1927
- Shwe Talay, 1927
- Khin Maung Gyi, 1927
- Honeymoon Period, 1929
- Wai Lwin Lwin, 1929
- Mr Batchelor, 1930
- Love Triangle, 1930
- Shwe Pay Lhwa

== Personal life ==
Ba Galay also known as Mohammed Bashir was a Burmese Muslim, born in Bassein (now Pathein) in 1890 (9th waning of Tabodwe month 1254 Burmese calendar). His parents were Bassein High School teachers U Pho Thi and Daw Thae Mhone.

In June 1938, he received head and back injuries from a collapse of his kitchen. He was treated for three months in Rangoon and later shifted to Bassein. His mental condition deteriorated and when Cartoon Hein Soon visited him with the donations from the friends in Rangoon, he asked about the famous journalist Zawana.

Later because of the bombings, he shifted to Hinthada and again to Gambi town. He died at the age of 52 on 5 June 1945.

== See also ==
- Famous Burmese Muslims
- Islam in Burma
- Dances of Burma
