= Saya Gyi U Nu =

Saya Gyi U Nu U Nu Mohamad Kassim
- ဦးနု;
- Born: Mohamad Kassim; 17 July 1762; Shwebo
- Died: 1822; Amarapura
- Resting place: near Taung Thaman In (Lake), Link Zin Kone, Amarapura
- Occupations: author, royal officer
- Title: Shwe Taung Thargathu, Royal Custom Officer, Royal Purchasing Officer
- Parent(s): Sheik Darwood (father), Daw Nyein (mother)

U Nu Mohamad Kassim, better known as Saya Gyi U Nu, or U Nu (Burmese: ဦးနု; IPA: [ʔú nṵ], July 17, 1762 – 1822), was a leading Burmese Muslim writer during the reign of King Bodawpaya. He combined words and terms from Burmese religious literature with poetic writing and Islamic ideas to produce books which are regarded as classics of Burmese Muslim literature. Bodawpaya appointed him to head a mission to India, to retrieve books and scriptures in Sanskrit, Hindi, Urdu, and Persian. Nu was appointed the Mayor of Yammar Wati (now Ramree Island) with the title Shwe Taung Thargathu, which means "Hero of the Ocean".

== Early life ==
Nu was born in Shwebo on 17 July 1762, during the reign of King Naungdawgyi of the Konbaung dynasty. His father, Sheik Darwood, and mother, Daw Nyein were from the Taung Baloo quarters in Ava. He studied Burmese Classic literature, history and astrology at the Ava Nan Oo Phonegyi Kyaung, and was a friend of the prince Bodawpaya since they were seven years old. At 19 years old, he followed his father to Rangoon, in lower Burma, where he studied Islamic literature, Arabic, Urdu and Persian from Syed Mohamad of Syria. Nu became fluent in the Pali, Thekkata, Hindi and Dekkani languages.

== Career ==
He became an Imam (Islamic religious leader).

He translated a book and named in Burmese Islamic book in Eleven Chapters from Arabic to Burmese when he was 29 years old. as part of his Fard. When he was 32, he finished translation into Burmese and named the Islamic book in Three Chapters which he emphasized Islamic belief and basic concepts that Muslims should accept.

When he was 50, he wrote Islamic book in Six Chapters. In 1814, he wrote Analysis of Philosophy (Panyat Khwetan) in 16 paragram poem.

He finished the Saerajay Sharaei in 35 Chapters (Light of Islam) which addressed various topics in Islam. The 35 Chapters book was later published in 1929 and reprinted in 1931 under the title Guardian of the Burmese-Muslim Race Oopanisha scripture. The slogan, “If the wrongs prevail, the Rightful path will disappear” was published in Burmese and Arabic. He later wrote Disciplinary teachings in Seven Paragraph Poems as an appendix to the 35 Chapters Book.

He wrote ”Royal Report Book” in response to Bowdapaya's query about the various religions, including Islam.

He also wrote the Golden book on Miraj (المعراج) (the Ascension to the Seven Heavens during the Night Journey).

On 30 November 1805, Nu went to Bengal for trading. He exported Areca nut or Betel nut through Hantharwaddy port of lower Burma and four towns in Arakan. Later he went to Arakan directly from Ava and based on that trip he wrote a poem with 55 Para.

On 12 February 1807, Bodawpaya sent him to Bengal to retrieve religious, medical and other books. Nu was accompanied by Mindon and Shew Taung Thiri Sith U Myae. The diplomatic group brought back various books, scriptures and presents from King Thargara and King Bayanathi. After the trip, Nu was appointed the Mayor of Yammar Wati (now Ramree Island) with the title Shwe Taung Thargathu, which means "Hero of the Ocean". Nu wrote “Diary on Bengal trip written as a poem.”

On 12 October 1808, Bodawpaya sent Nu to India to draw the map of the surrounding area, and to bring back more Buddhist Scriptures. Nu's expedition team included Indians who had come to Ava. After traveling to places all over India, (Note: U Nu's 1808-1810 expedition included visits to Salin Pha Aing Dalet route to Danyawaddy and continued to Chittagong, Longipura Dacca, Muthu, Yaza Mayan, Ganges river and the confluence with the Asirawaty river, Damma Nagarat, Monkarit and Pathana town. Then they divided into two groups, one of which went to Bodhi Tree in Bodhgaya.) the expedition returned to Sagaing on 18 May 1810, with books, scriptures, various memorabilia and presents.

Nu and the team were also sent as spies disguised as the persons searching for the books and scriptures. They also built a rapport with some of the city-state kings in India, some of them sent some presents and requested the Burmese Army's help to repel the British. U Nu was sent again as a spy to India by Bagyidaw who succeeded Bodawpaya.

King Bodawpaya recognized him as a poet and also appointed him as the Royal Customs Officer and Royal Purchasing Officer.

He had informed the Majesty about the Colonial British and their methods to colonize a country, behaviour, customs, etc. 80 years before Thibaw Min was overthrown and exiled to Ratnagiri, India.

With the help of Nu's Bengal information, Bodawpaya was able to capture the western kingdom of Rakhine, which had been largely independent since the fall of Bagan, in 1784. Bodawpaya also formally annexed Manipur, a rebellion-prone protectorate, in 1813.

U Nu served King Bodawpaya in Amarapura, where he read and wrote articles, poems and books. After Bodawpaya's death in 1819, Nu remained at Amarapura until he died in 1822. He was buried near Taung Thaman In (Lake) at Link Zin Kone in Amarapura.

== Personal life ==
When Nu was 26, he returned to the capital of Nay Pyidaw, and married Ma Mae Ma Marium, who was from Ava, and was the daughter of Thwe Thaukkyi U Thar Dun Sheik Ali. They had a son, Sheik Abdul Kareem Maung Maung Pye, and two daughters: Noor Neza Ma Myat Hla and Khairulneza Ma Myat Htut.

== Books ==
Nu had written and/or translated over sixty books, nine of which were notably published. This is a listing of some of Nu's books and poems:

- Islamic book in Eleven Chapters
- Islamic book in Three Chapters
- Diary on Bengal trip
- Saerajay Sharaei in 35 Chapters - also known as 35 Chapters book (reprinted 1929) and Guardian of the Burmese-Muslim Race oopanisha scripture (1931)
- Disciplinary teachings in Seven Paragraph Poems
- Royal Report Book
- Golden book on Miraj

== Works cited ==
- Zaw, Aung (August 27, 2008). Taing Yin Muslim (Burmese Muslim), famous poets and authors, Book Series in Islam No. 47: Badon Min era Muslim poet Shew Taung Thargathu U Nu. Union of Myanmar Islamic Council Headquarters. 86pp.
- Maung Than Win. Myanmar Literature (in Burmese). Mandalay University: MMSY - Myanmar Muslim Student Youth Organization.

== See also ==
- Islam in Myanmar
