= Oba Thaung =

Burmese anyeint dancer and singer (1898–1971)

- ဩဘာသောင်း
- Born: Thaung Tin; 11 April 1898; Pazundaung Township, Rangoon, British Burma
- Died: 13 January 1971 (aged 72); Mandalay, Burma
- Occupations: Burmese dancer and instructor
- Known for: Kabya Lut Aka
- Awards: Wunna Kyawhtin

Oba Thaung (Burmese: ဩဘာသောင်း, MLCTS: obha saung:), born Thaung Tin (Burmese: သောင်းတင်, MLCTS: saung: tang Burmese pronunciation: [θáʊɰ̃ tɪ̀ɰ̃], 11 April 1898 – 13 January 1971) was an eminent Burmese anyeint dancer and singer, who is credited for codifying the previously undocumented Burmese dance repertory.

She started her dancing career since she was fourteen and had had twenty four years of experiences. In 1953, the State School of Fine Arts was open in Mandalay and Oba Thaung served as first dance instructor for female students. There, she codified 125 steps of the traditional Burmese choreography, literally named Kabya Lut Aka (ကဗျာလွတ်အက; Dance without Verse), which consists of five dance courses intended as a five-year term of study. Each of the five courses is broken into 25 dance sequences comprising a total of 125 stages, with each stage of precisely ten minutes.

She was awarded the title Wunna Kyawhtin, the highest honor given to an artist by the Burmese government.

== See also ==
- Burmese dance
- Anyeint
- Sin Kho Ma Lay
- Yindaw Ma Lay
- Ma Htwe Lay
- Aung Bala
- Liberty Ma Mya Yin
- Mya Chay Gyin Ma Ngwe Myaing
