= Po Sein =

Burmese dance actor

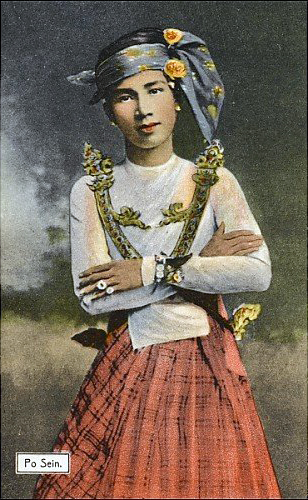
- Born: 27 April 1882; 1st waxing of Kason 1244 ME; Myaungmya Township, British Burma
- Died: 22 December 1952 (aged 70); 7th waxing of Pyatho 1315 ME; Rangoon, Burma
- Organization: Sein Maha Thabin (စိန်မဟာသဘင်)
- Spouse: 3 wives
- Children: Several children, including Kenneth Maung Khe Sein
- Parent(s): U San Dun (ဦးစံဒွန်း) and Daw Shwe Yout (ဒေါ်ရွှေရုပ်)

Po Sein (Burmese: ဘိုးစိန်, pronounced [pʰó sèiɰ̃]; 18 April 1882 – 11 January 1954) was an influential 20th-century traditional leading Burmese dance actor in Myanmar Drama Event and singer, who has been credited with innovating and modernizing Burmese performance arts, in dance, song, costumes, and stagecraft. He also established the Mandalay-based performance troupe, "Sein Maha Thabin" (စိန်မဟာသဘင်), which remained family-run until 1993, when it was closed by his grandson Ye Sein.

== Innovations ==
Po Sein was particularly successful at introducing a variety of stage innovations, by explaining the changes to audience and interacting with them throughout the performance.

Also, he adapted the Buddhist Jataka tales, which had previously been exclusively performed by marionette puppets, for live actors, by creating dances and songs as part of the performance repertoire. Until the late 1800s, it was considered taboo for live actors to depict such sacred stories of the previous lives of the Buddha. His innovations led to a decline in the popularity of the marionette theater troupes, by breaking their monopoly on Jataka plays.

Furthermore, he revolutionized Burmese stagecraft by incorporating a raised stage for dramatic performances, which had been previously confined to marionette theater, which uses a raised platform (hence the name amyint thabin or အမြင့်သဘင်).

He modernized the classical dance drama form, zat pwe (ဇာတ်ပွဲ), by adding variety acts, chorus lines, introducing admission. He was also the first male lead to have intimate onstage interactions with the lead actress, which has since become a norm in couple dances.

=== Costumes ===
Po Sein is credited with introducing stockings and slippers as part of dancers' costumes; they had previously danced barefoot. He also introduced the modern costume worn by comedians (lupyet or lu shwin daw), which consists of a checkered Taungshay-style paso (sarong) and a loose jacket (previously, comedians had performed shirtless).

=== Controversy ===
During the 1920 national boycott against the British administration, he was involved in a controversy for dubbing Mandalay boycotters as "young rebels" in a local newspaper. Students in Mandalay and Yangon responded by boycotting his performances, forcing him to later apologize.

== See also ==
- Burmese dance
- Anyeint
