= Naga Daw Oo =

20th century Burmese business magnate

Aggamahāsīrisudhammasiṅgī Naga Daw Oo
- Born: Oo; 27 April 1910; Mandalay, British Burma
- Died: 11 July 1995 (aged 85); Mandalay
- Occupations: Owner, Naga Cheroot
- Known for: Yay Nan Thuza Mandalay Thingyan; Religious donations
- Spouse: Naga U Htun Chun
- Parent(s): U Htin (father); Daw Su (mother)
- Awards: Aggamahāsīrisudhammasiṅgī

Oo (Burmese: ဦး, pronounced [ʔú]; 27 April 1910 – 11 July 1995), known as Naga Daw Oo (Burmese: နဂါး ဒေါ်ဦး, pronounced [nəgá dɔ̀ ʔú]), was a 20th-century Burmese business tycoon from Mandalay, Myanmar. She is best remembered for her decades-long involvement with the annual Thingyan festivities in Mandalay as well as her contributions to Buddhist causes across the country. She was the first person to receive the title of Agga Maha Thiri Thudhamma Theingi (Pali: Aggamahāsīrisudhammasiṅgī), the highest possible religious title for lay Buddhists in Myanmar.

== Early life ==
Born to U Htin and Daw Su on 27 April 1910 in Mandalay, Oo was the eldest of 12 siblings. She was an elder sister of Ludu Daw Amar, a dissident writer and journalist. Oo was educated at the American Baptist Missionary School before leaving the school in 1927.

== Business career ==
In 1929, Oo married Htun Chun of Myinmu. The couple founded the Naga Cheroot Company, a cigar-cheroot manufacturing company, in 1938. After her husband died during World War II, she assumed leadership of the company. In the 1960s, the Naga Cheroot was nationalized by the Union Revolutionary Council, leading to its eventual failure.

=== Thingyan festival ===
For about 40 years, Oo ran the "Yay Nan Thuza" (or "Naga Me") mandat (pavilion) during the annual Thingyan festival in Mandalay. She personally managed a yein troupe and a water-throwing team, comprising shop owners and staff from the Zegyo Market.

== Later life ==
=== Donations ===
Oo made many meritorious deeds, one of them was Naga Monastery in Mandalay. She was awarded the Sāsanānuggaha title (Sāsanānuggaha loosely translates as support of religious affairs) of Aggamahāsīrisudhammasiṅgī by the government for her contributions to Buddhist causes in Myanmar.

=== Death ===
Oo died in Mandalay on 11 July 1995 at the age of 85.

== See also ==
- Burmese Buddhist titles
- Upāsaka and Upāsikā
