= Bruce Gaston (musician) =

American musician in Thailand (1946/1947 – 2021)

Bruce Gaston (11 March 1946 or 1947 – 17 October 2021) was an American musician who lived in Thailand and helped pioneer a contemporary style of Thai classical music through the Fong Naam band, which he co-founded with Boonyong Ketkong and Jirapan Ansvananda.

Bruce Gaston was born on 11 March 1946 or 1947 in Los Angeles, California. (Note: Sources differ on his year of birth.) He studied music at the University of Southern California, obtaining a bachelor's degree in philosophy and a master's in music in 1969, before electing to work in Thailand under alternative service as a conscientious objector during the Vietnam War. He established a music education program at Payap College (now Payap University) in Chiang Mai, learned Thai classical music, and settled down in the country. He met National Artist Boonyong in 1979, and in 1981 they formed the Fong Naam band, which experimented with the classical tradition by blending in elements of Western electronic music, forming a new contemporary movement. In 2003, he co-founded Gitameit, a music school, in Yangon, Myanmar. Gaston received an honorary Silpathorn Award in 2009 for his contributions to the field.

Gaston died on 17 October 2021 in Bangkok.
