= Sein Beda =

Sein Beda စိန်ဗေဒါ
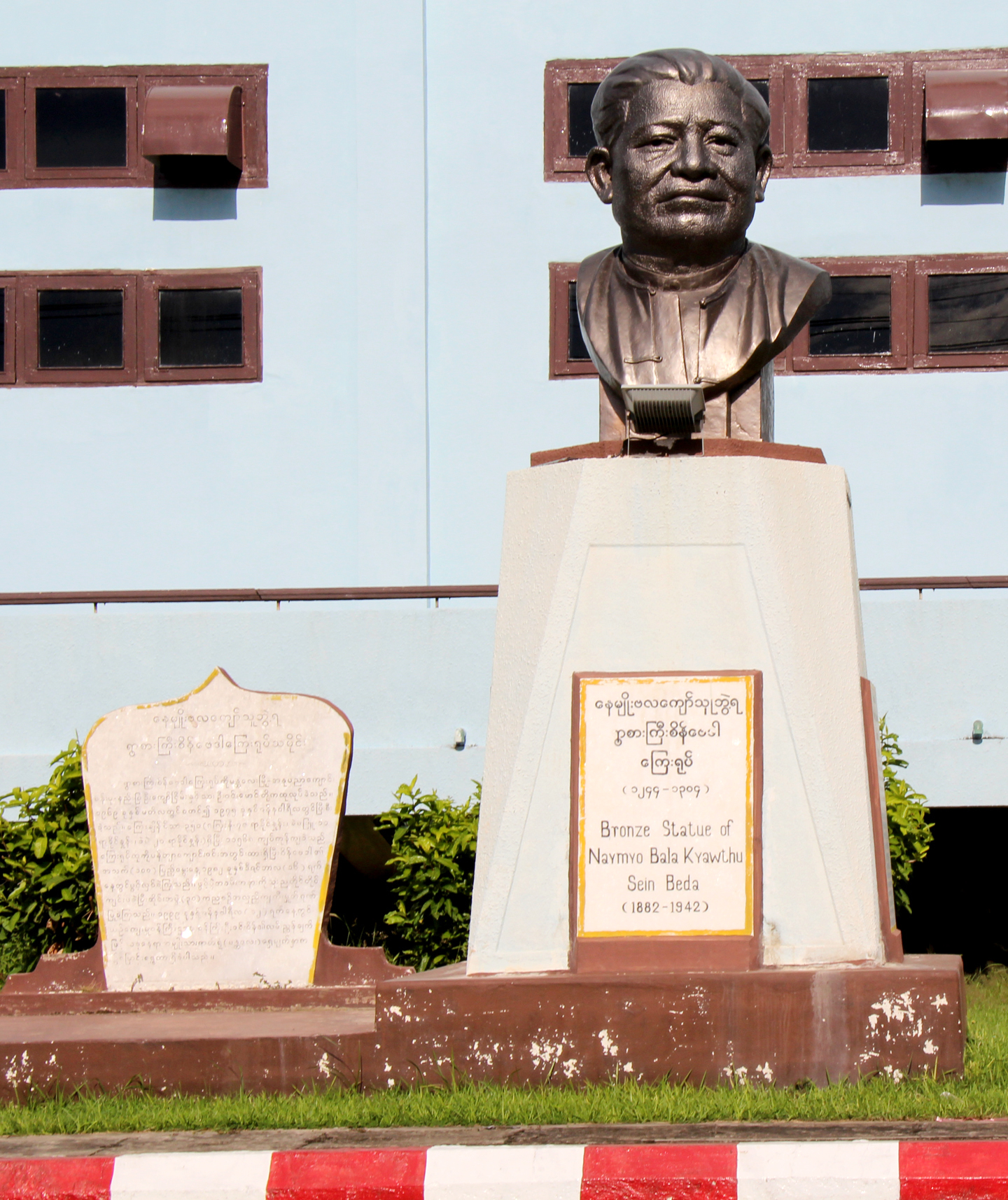
- Bronze bust of Sein Beda

Background information
- Also known as: Maung Ka-Lay
- Born: Tha Hlaing; 10 November 1882; Friday, 1st waxing of Nadaw 1244 ME (Note: His birthday is reported as Friday, New Moon of Tazaungmon 1244 ME, which translates to Thursday, 9 November 1882. If he was indeed born on a Friday—the weekday of birth is quite important in Burmese culture, and is less likely to be misremembered; and indeed his zata name was Tha Hlaing, a Friday born name—the birthdate was most probably Friday, 10 November 1882. The discrepancy may be due to the fact that he was born in the early morning of Friday.); Mandalay, Konbaung dynasty
- Died: 8 October 1942 (aged 59); Thursday, 14th waning of Tawthalin 1304 ME Rangoon, Japanese Burma
- Genres: Mahagita (Burmese classical)
- Occupation: Musician
- Instrument: Hsaing waing

Sein Beda (Burmese: စိန်ဗေဒါ; also spelt Sein Baydar; 10 November 1882 – 8 October 1942) was a prominent Burmese classical musician based in Mandalay, Burma (now Myanmar).

== Career ==
Sein Beda was known for his expertise in the hsaing waing, the Burmese musical ensemble, ranging from traditional instruments such as the saung, mi gyaung, and pattala, to Western instruments like the violin, banjo, mandolin, concertina, and cornet.

Sein Beda began performing at the age of 16. He was a favorite musician of Thibaw Min, the Konbaung dynasty's last reigning monarch, and was conferred the title of Nemyo Bala Kyaw Thu (နေမျိုးဗလကျော်သူ) and an appanage of a large village by Thibaw Min for his musical talents. He became the first Burmese hsaing musician to perform in British India, after being invited to the housewarming of Thibaw Min's residence in Ratnagiri.

During the British colonial period, Sein Beda introduced various innovations to the ensemble, including decorating ensemble stands with traditional Burmese motifs and glass mosaic, introducing a jazz band to the ensemble, creating spotlights, and introducing musician uniforms.

Beda died of a throat problem (possibly cancer) on 8 October 1942 in Rangoon. (Note: (Myint Swe 2014: 78–80): According to Myint Swe, then a resident physician at the wartime makeshift Rangoon General Hospital, Beda showed up at the hospital on the morning of 13th waning of Tawthalin 1304 ME (7 October 1942) to see Dr. Ba Than. Beda had travelled all the way from Mandalay, which took several days because of wartime conditions. His throat problem was diagnosed as too advanced and he was not admitted to the hospital. Ba Than suspected throat cancer. As Beda was a close family friend—Myint Swe's father was Beda's personal physician, and Myint Swe had played music together with Beda at his family house throughout his youth—Myint Swe visited Beda at the house he was staying in, the next day. Beda died at around 7:20 pm with Myint Swe by the bedside.)

== Legacy ==
Among Sein Beda's children was Sein Hla Maung, an orchestra musician. His granddaughter Shwe Aye Aye Myint was a prominent classical dancer from the 1980s to the 1990s.

== Biography ==
- Myint Swe, Wunna Kyawhtin Dr. (2014). The Japanese Era Rangoon General Hospital: Memoir of a Wartime Physician. Translated by Zarny Tun (1st ed.). Yangon: Myanmar Book Centre. ISBN 978-99971-852-9-7.
