= Anyeint =

Burmese entertainment form

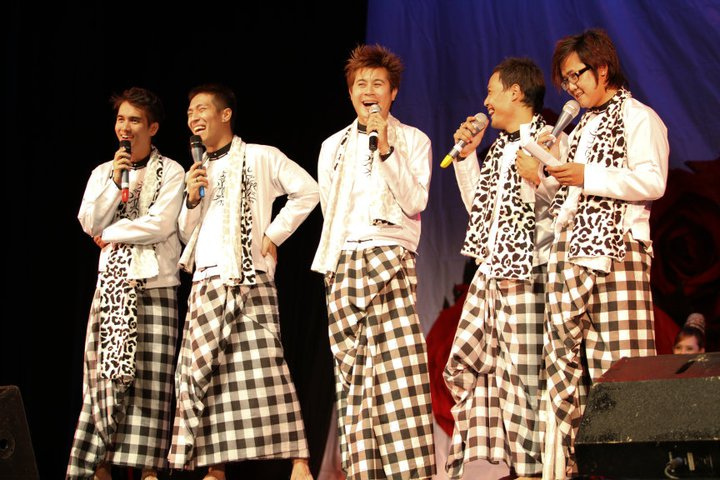
Comedians performing together as part of the Htawara Hninzi troupe (Eternal Rose) in Singapore on 6 Mar 2011.

Anyeint (Burmese: အငြိမ့်; MLCTS: a ngrim.; IPA: [ʔəɲḛiɰ̃]; Burmese: အငြိမ့်; also spelt a-nyeint) is a traditional Burmese entertainment form that combines dance with instrumental music, song, and comedy routines, in theatrical performances. It is a form of pwe, the Burmese word for traditional entertainment. While classical pwe can be quite formal and almost ritualistic, anyeint is considered light entertainment.

In recent years, popular anyeint troupes such as Thee Lay Thee & Say Yaung Zoun (သီးလေးသီးနှင့်ဆေးရောင်ဆုံ) and Htawara Hninzi (ထာရဝနှင်းဆီ) have performed overseas, including Thailand, Singapore and the United States, which have large Burmese immigrant populations. VCDs of popular troupes' performances are also widely distributed; politically insensitive ones, including Say Yaung Zoun (ဆေးရောင်ဆုံ), have been banned by Burmese authorities.

== Characters ==
The lead singer and dancer in an anyeint performance is called the anyeint minthami (အငြိမ့်မင်းသမီး). Well-known film actresses and singers, including May Than Nu and Yadana Khin, are often featured as lead anyeint actresses. The anyeint minthami dances to instrumental music and singing either a cappella or to music are interspersed with comedic dialogue and slapstick performed by clowns. The result is a sequence of solo and group dances. The costumes of anyeint performers are identical to those worn by puppets in traditional marionette theater. Although lead actresses were once the main focus of performances, the focus has now shifted to the comedic skits performed.

Slapstick comedians, known as lu shwin daw (လူရွှင်တော်) or lu pyet (လူပျက်, although this term is falling out of usage) provide entertainment while the minthami changes outfits. Zarganar and Kutho were successful comedians in early anyeint revival. In more recent times, well-known film actors and singers, such as Ye Lay, Nay Toe and Htun Htun, Kyaw Kyaw Bo, have featured as comedians. Comedians typically dressed in checkered-patterned Taungshay-style longyi (sarongs) and wear loose coats, a development innovated by U Po Sein, an influential 19th-century performer.

A small all-male music orchestra, led by the pattala (xylophone) music, accompanies the performance.

== Format ==
Anyeint performances begin with a recitation and explanation of ancient verses, followed by a pari kamma (ပရိကမ္မ), a formal speech by troupe members to introduce themselves and thank the show's patron. Comedians then provide an introductory slapstick skit, before inviting the lead actress to the stage for a performance, during which they will provide improvised jokes and playful insults to the audience. At the end of the dance set, comedians direct jokes at the actress, who rebuts them and defends herself.

In the past, the anyeint performance was concluded with a verse play called zat kyi (ဇာတ်ကြီး), although this portion is now omitted from contemporary anyeint programmes.

== Origins ==
The name "anyeint" comes from a Burmese language word meaning "gentle". The form originated as a royal court dance performed by female dancers and was originally confined to the royal court. However, after the end of the Konbaung dynasty in 1885, anyeint troupes were forced to seek work outside and popularized a hybrid dance and comedic performance that has become popular throughout Burma, especially appealing to the growing merchant class in British Burma, who patronised and sponsored these performances. The first known anyeint troupe was formed in Mandalay around 1900, by comedian U Chit Phwe and his wife, dancer Ma Sein Thone.

In the colonial era, famous anyeint actresses often became recording artists and were the headlines of anyeint shows, as composers wrote individual songs and dances suited to them. However, the importance of the lead actress has diminished. Anyeint reached its height in the 1970s, during a period of socialist rule, with one of the most influential troupes being Mandalay's Lamin Taya (The Hundred Moon Troupe). In 1973, the troupe's scriptwriter, Maung Myat Hmaing wrote Dancer of the Ganges, which was one of the first Burmese plays to include the concept of democracy.

During the colonial, U Nu and Ne Win administrations, troupes commonly included political satire and critiques, including social commentary, as part of their skits. However, since 1988, regulations have become stricter, with comedians who perform political satire subject to arrest. From 1988 to 1992, a military curfew at night prohibited all-night anyeint performances.

Since the release of the anyeint play Hninzi Thakhin (နှင်းဆီသခင်, lit. "Rose Master") in 2010, censorship of play contents have become stricter; the Myanmar Motion Picture Enterprise, the censorship body that regulates all anyeint troupes in the country, now mandates a full dress rehearsal to audit for any questionable content (such as jokes targeted at government officials, or cross-dressing scenes).

The Burmese comedian, Zarganar, has frequently performed in anyeint. In 1986, he formed the Mya Ponnama Anyeint troupe, whose performances have appeared on television. The Burmese performance art Htein Lin has also performed anyeint, which is an influence in his performance art.
