= Burmese dance =

Dance in Myanmar

In the Mintha Theatre (Mandalay) a master teacher of the Inwa School of Performing Arts demonstrates traditional hand movements.

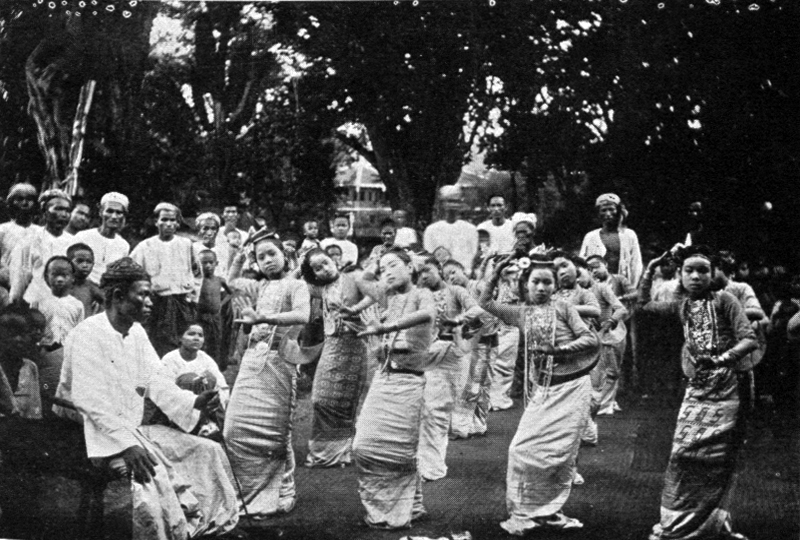
A village group dance in the early 1900s

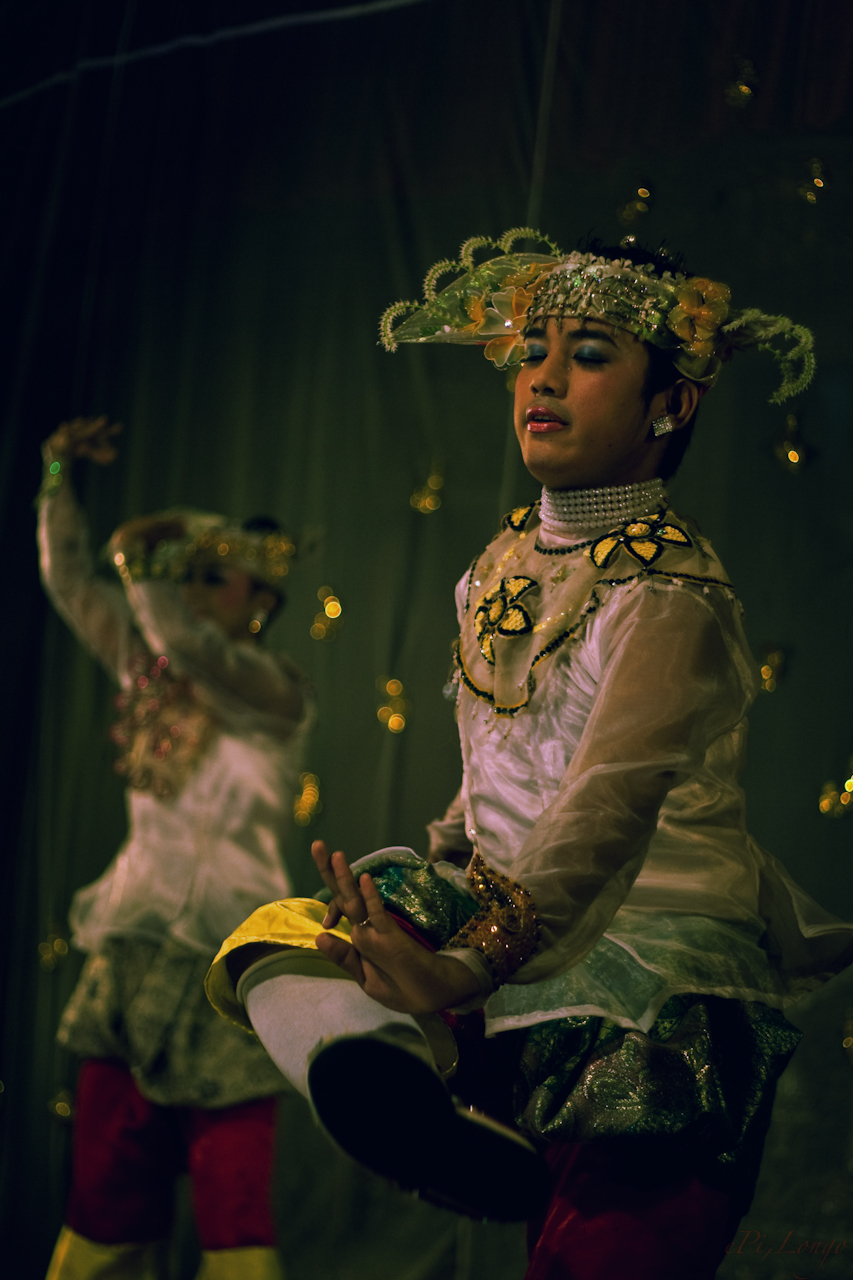
Traditional dance performance at the Karaweik in Yangon

Dance in Burma (since 1989 known as Myanmar) can be divided into dramatic, folk and village, and nat dances, each having distinct characteristics. Although Burmese dance resemble the traditional dancing style of its neighbors, in particular Thailand, it retains unique qualities that distinguish it from other regional styles, including angular, fast-paced and energetic movements and emphasis on pose, not movement.

== History ==
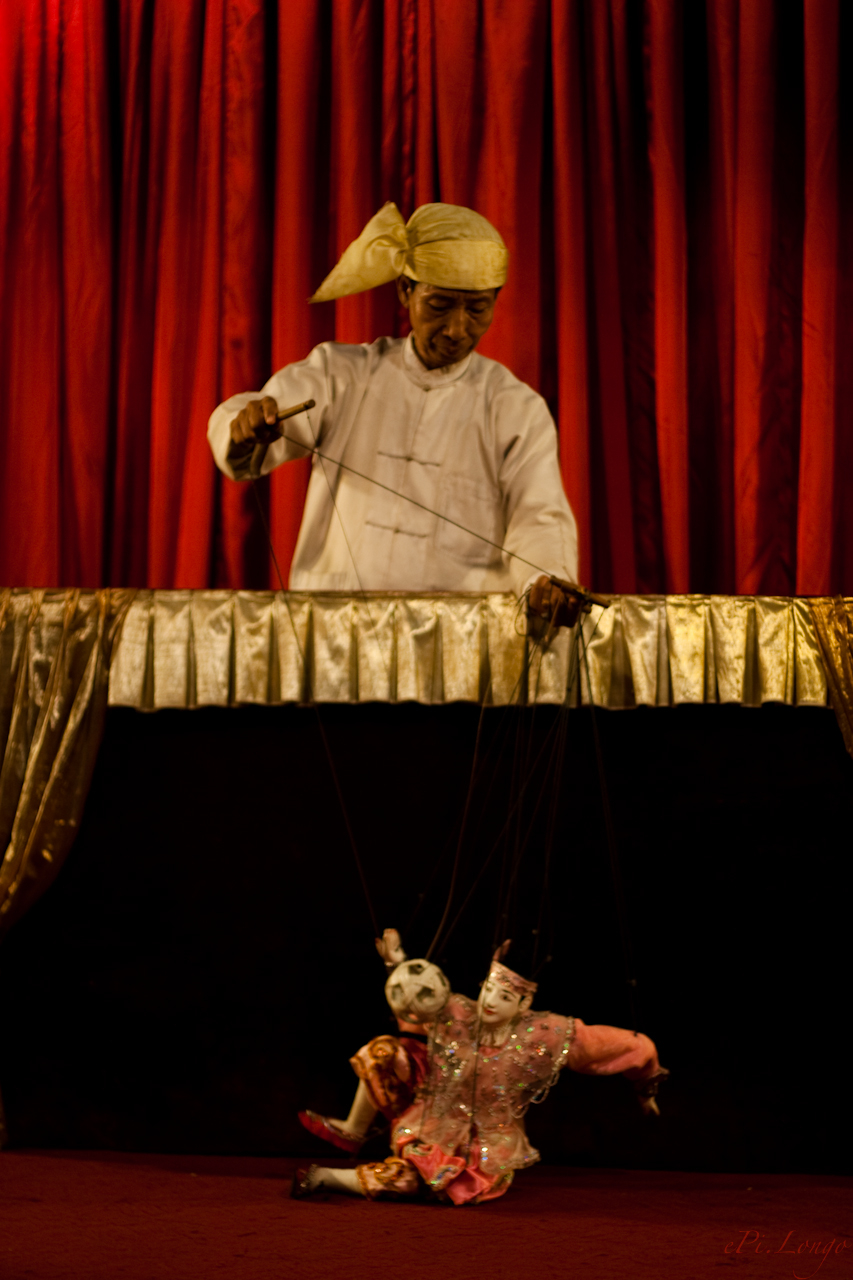
Puppet theatre (အမြင့်သဘင်) is the inspiration for many movements in traditional Burmese dancing, whose movements are reminiscent of puppets.

The origins of Burmese dance are traced to the Pyu, Halin, and Mon cultures in the central and lower Irrawaddy regions from at least two centuries before the Christian era. Archaeological evidence shows Indian influences already in this. There were also influences from Thai and Khmer cultures during the many invasions and counter-invasions that occurred over the next two millennia. There was a particularly well documented infusion of dance forms, such as the Yama Zatdaw (the Burmese version of the Ramayana) in 1767, when the Burmese sacked Ayutthaya (ယိုးဒယား) and expropriated a large component of the Thai court.

Some of the surviving forms (including the belu, nat gadaw and zawgyi dances) honour folklore characters that are quintessentially Burmese, some of these from pre-Buddhist times. There is also a close relationship between the classical Burmese marionette and human dance art forms, with the former obviously imitating human dance, but also with human dance imitating the movements of the marionette.

After independence from Britain in 1948, there was a period of strong Burmese cultural nationalism that resulted in the establishment of the State School of Music in Mandalay in 1953. A well-known dancer of the day, Oba Thaung, is credited with codifying the nearly completely undocumented Burmese dance repertory. Her syllabus at the school was condensed into five dance courses intended as a five-year term of study. Each of the five courses is broken into dance sequences comprising a total of 125 stages, with each stage being precisely ten minutes long.

== Training ==
The Inwa School of Performing Arts in Mandalay is a cultural high school in Mandalay that prepares young artists to perform Myanmar classical dance and music to professional standards.

== Bagan dance ==
This dance originates from the time of the Pyu kingdoms (5th-10th century). A small number of relatively simple musical instruments were used and the dance style is slow and sedate. The costumes of dancers, as depicted in wall paintings, were scanty and revealing.

== Bilu dance ==
The bilus (demons or ogres) are ancient characters, thought to originate from a legendary race that roamed India and Burma circa 2000 BC. Buddhist literature describes them as primitive and feared by other races.

In literature, the Belus are described as having transmogrifying powers—an ability to take on different physical appearances. There are 24 different classical demon forms, each with its own name and role in stories and plays. One of the best known is Dasagiri, a demon in the Indian Ramayana epic.

In any of his forms, the Belus embodies the Devil. He is terrifying, overbearing and diabolical by nature. But he has a gentle side also. In a typical dance, Dasa-Giri often offers a bouquet of flowers to a dainty damsel. The demure lady is unable to overlook the beastly side and declines his darling present. The demon then expresses his dejection at the refusal.

== Kinnara and kinnari dances ==
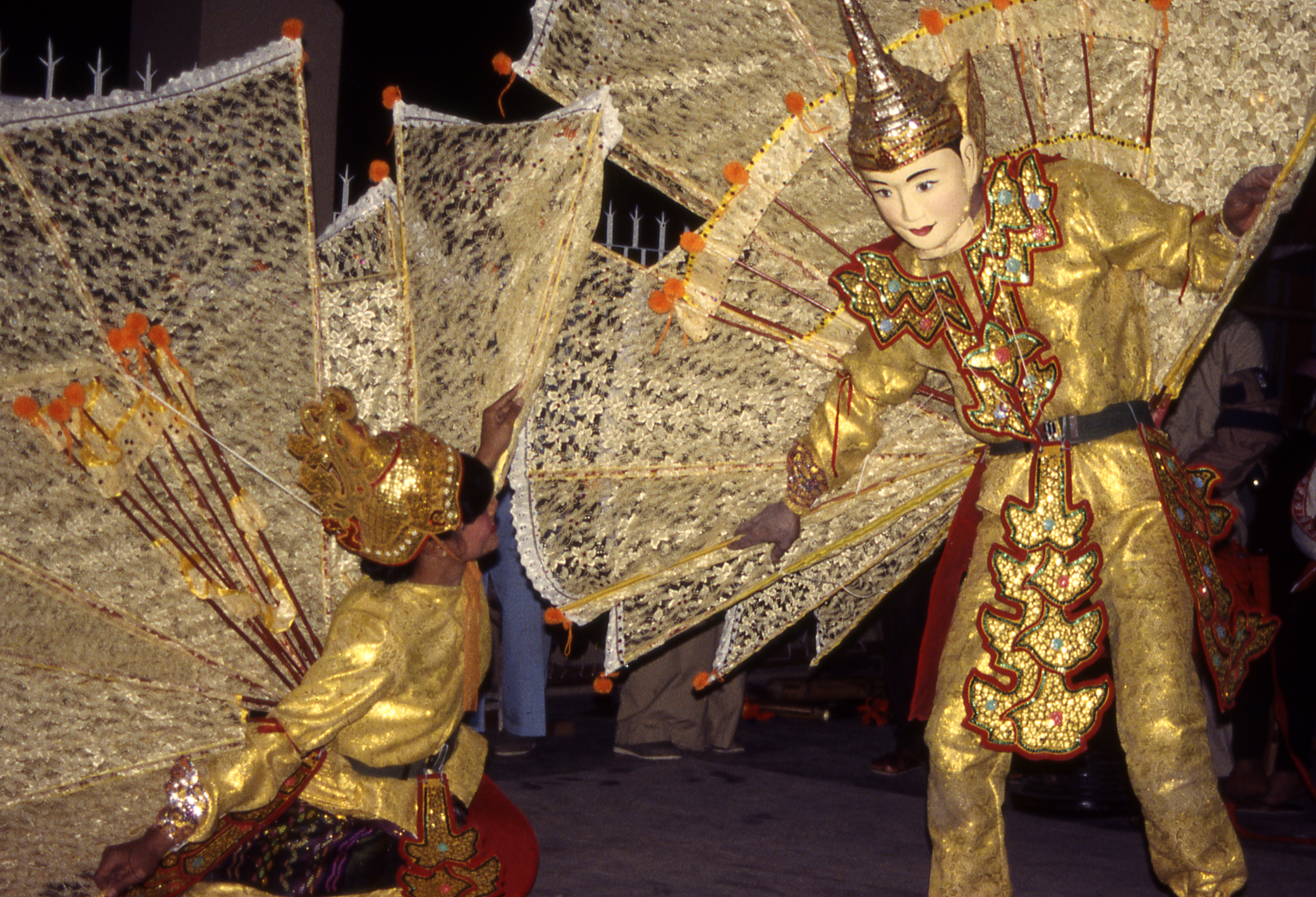
Shan kinnara and kinnari dance

There are many references in the Pali and Sanskrit literature to the mythical birds with human head and torso, Kinnara (male) and Kinnari (female). According to the literature, the birds originated in prehistoric India. They appear in some of the discourses of the Buddha himself.

In Burma, images of the Bird's dancing styles are found painted and carved on the walls at Bagan and (even earlier) from the Pyu kingdoms.

The songs and dances describe the Bird's happy re-union after a separation of 700 nights due to a heavy rainstorm and floods. The dance is a popular emblem of true love and has an ancient history that is kept alive by the Burma dance troupes.

The dancers are attired with flapping wings at their wrists, in contrast to wings at their armpits, as is characteristic of Thailand and other Asian countries. The dance of bird-like movements is very supple and fine, and intricately coordinated with the accompanying music.

== Mount Popa's guardian spirits dance ==
According to Burmese folklore (but probably based on quasi-historical facts), Me Wunna, a beautiful princess was a sister of the king of Thaton in lower Burma. Estranged from her brother, she refused betrothal to a royal descendant and lived in exile and alone in the forests of Mount Popa. As a devout Buddhist she abstained from eating meat and lived solely on flowers and fruits. She generally wore the mask of a demon to frighten away foes and friends alike. Thus she was reputed to be a flower-eating demon.

Later she fell in love with a royal dispatcher of fantastic physique, and begot two able sons with him. Unfortunately, her spouse was then executed for being derelict in fetching flowers from the mount. As a result, he became a nat (spirit).

Me Wunna's two sons, when they grew up, became distinguished heroes in the Royal Army. Unfortunately they fell victim to an intrigue, were executed for pretense, and became transformed into the two famous Spirits, the "Brother Nats" of Taungbyone.

However that was not the end of it. The bad tidings of her sons’ untimely deaths caused Me Wunna to die of heartbreak. So she became a nat as well and became duly enshrined at Mt. Popa, where she became "Super-Exalted" to supreme power in the Realm of the Nats.

The dancer, clad traditionally in regal apparel of green colour, impersonates the Spirit. On her head is perched the mask of a demon. In her hands, she holds two quills of a peacock's tail, the symbol of the sun, to banish Darkness (the evil element). She dances as an apparition with grace and subtlety.

== Nat dance ==
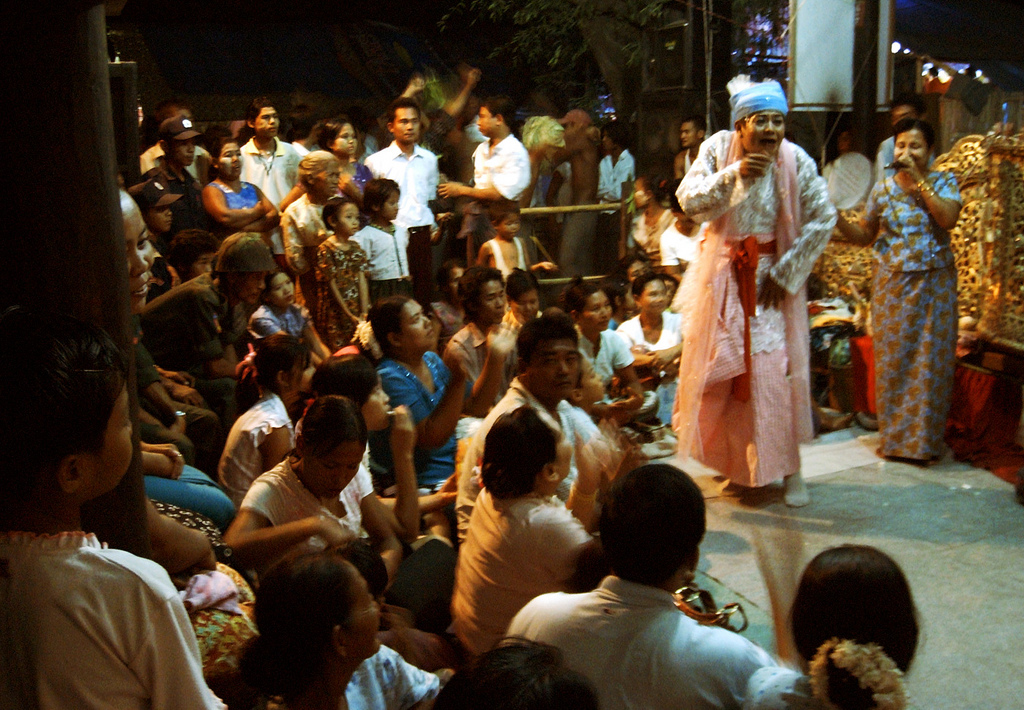
A nat gadaw (spirit medium) dance in Amarapura

In Burma, it is traditional to make an offering of a green coconut, three hands of bananas, and a few other accessories, to the Guardian Spirit of Land (a nat) prior to an important event such as an inauguration. This appeasement of the Spirit is usually done by a professional Spirit Medium (Nakadaw).

The dancer is often attired in red silk, including a red headband and, around the chest, and a tightly knotted red scarf. With the offerings on a tray, she or he dances in propitiation and repeats the sequence three times. As medium dances she sings ritual songs to the 37 National Nats (Spirits) and the Local Nat.

At the onset, the dance is delicate and the music legato. After a verbal injunction, the dancer quickens to the rising intensity of the music. As the Medium enjoins the Spirits, the movements and the music reach a frenzied crescendo.

== Oil lamp dance ==
In the oil lamp dance (ဆီမီးကွက်အက), the traditional oil lamp offered to the Buddha is a lighted wick of cotton soaked in an oil-filled earthenware saucer is the centerpiece of the dance. A lighted candle now usually substitutes in its place. The Rakhine people of western Burma incorporate the oil lamp dance in many of their traditional dances, mostly devotional, to the Buddha.

The performer's hands are always upturned (to retain the oil). Elders who remember performing with traditional lamps say that the secret is to not let the lamp drop while, at the same time, conveying particular expressions with various attitudes of the hands and legs. "It is almost an ordeal", they added.

== Ramayana dances ==
In 1767, King Hsinbyushin of the Konbaung dynasty brought back Siamese captives to the Inwa (Ava), the kingdom's capital. Among the captives were Siamese court dancers who performed the Ramayana (Yama Zatdaw) wearing masks.

In this epic, Rama is the hero and chief character, Sita is the heroine, and Dasa-Giri is the villain demon. In a typical segment, Rama is enticed away by the Golden Deer, who is a transmogrified form of the demon sister of Dathagiri (Ravana). Dathagiri himself is metamorphed as a Hermit. Rama is then seen gravely following the tracks of the alluring Deer. The Deer leaves subtle hints as a trail.

== U Min Gyaw dance ==
U Min Gyaw, alias Pakhan Kyaw, is a well-known Burmese nat (spirit). There are a few different versions of his biography. One is that, being an adept horseman and son of a trusted royal guardian; he was knighted and given the Countship of the country town of Pakhan in central Burma. However, once in office he indulged himself in drinking, gambling (especially cock fighting), and in womanising.

He eventually had the audacity to dethrone and execute the king and others, including two young brothers, sons of a nobleman. These two brothers became famous nats and went on to long careers of mischief. However, in their first act, the two brothers used their new powers to pay back the Count in his own coin, causing the Count's murder and his return as the Nat U Min Gyaw.

When he takes in his human form, U Mingyaw takes relish drinking toddy, the sap of the palmyra tree (aka the "toddy palm"). His favourite hors d'œuvre, to go along with sap, is fried chicken or fowl. Therefore, the most effective propitiation is thought to be a pot of toddy and a fried fowl. Petitioners believe that U Min Gyaw will fulfill any wish that is made to him during his trance, although he usually expects a commission.

In a typical performance, the Medium appeals to U Min Gyaw by presenting him with a bottle of liquor in one hand and a fried fowl in the other. The dancer copies the drunken style of the Spirit.

== U Shwe Yoe and Daw Moe dance ==
U Shwe Yoe and Daw Moe dance in Los Angeles, 2007

Rather than a classic, this dance is an example of contemporary Burmese folk art. The dance has appeared out of the custom of entertaining the crowd, especially volunteers taking part in Flag Days or at community charitable activities. Its purpose is to inspire people to donate and to do meritorious deeds for the betterment of next lives.

The names U Shwe Yoe and Daw Moe are fictitious (not part of any classic text) and chosen for their rhyming effect. There is no established melody for the dance. Instead the orchestra improvises any lively tune, or recorded music is sometimes used. Enthusiastic citizens with no formal dance training often perform. The roles are one Old Bachelor (U Shwe Yoe) and one Spinster (Daw Moe), the latter played by either a male or female dancer. The choreography is spontaneous and designed to give the audience the best medicine.

The costumes are bizarre and flamboyant, with the indispensable elements of U Shwe Yoe's (independently animated) moustache and a twirling Pathein parasol. In a jocular manner, he emotes his love and makes a pass at Daw Moe, while she responds evasively and artfully. The audience, often mostly children and old folk, clap loudly and encourage Shwe Yoe in his persistence.

== Yein group dance ==
Yein is a form of group dance that features multiple dancers synchronously dancing and moving their heads, waists, feet, and hands to the beats of music, often performed by a traditional Burmese orchestra called hsaing waing or drums. It is commonly performed by troupes during Thingyan.

== Zat pwe duet dance ==
All-night performances, which combine melodrama, slapstick, traditional dance, and even pop music are called "zat pwe" in Burma. These seasonal events are staged in enclosed temporary bamboo theatres and are typically part of annual fund raising activities at pagoda festivals. The performers are travelling troupes, usually several dozen professional male and female dancers, musicians, comedians, and actors. These troupes travel widely throughout the country. The Duet Dance, a standard part of the Zat Pwe, typically starts near 2 or 3 a.m., and has a duration of about two hours.

Generally the lead actors dance with the lead actresses. The male dancers make a display, often with highly athletic and inventive elements. The male and female dancers sing in duet and exchange lover's vows.

There is often a competitive aspect to see who in the troupe can win the favour of the loudest cheers. During all of this, the orchestra must synchronise to the action occurring on the stage. When done with excellence, this dance can create national fame for the troupe.

== Zawgyi dance ==
Zawgyi is a Burmese folk character adept in the art of alchemy. He is said to have gained his supernatural skills through occult means. He inhabits thick forests near the Himalaya where he forages herbs for magical purposes. After searching for many years he obtained the Philosopher's stone and thereby gained Zawgyihood. Sometimes, with a touch of his magic wand he brings to life "illusory females" from trees bearing female-shaped fruits in order fulfill his carnal wishes.

The dance illustrates Zawgyi going about the forest, prancing with his wand, pulverising herbs and gamboling in jubilation after acquiring the Stone.

== Gallery ==
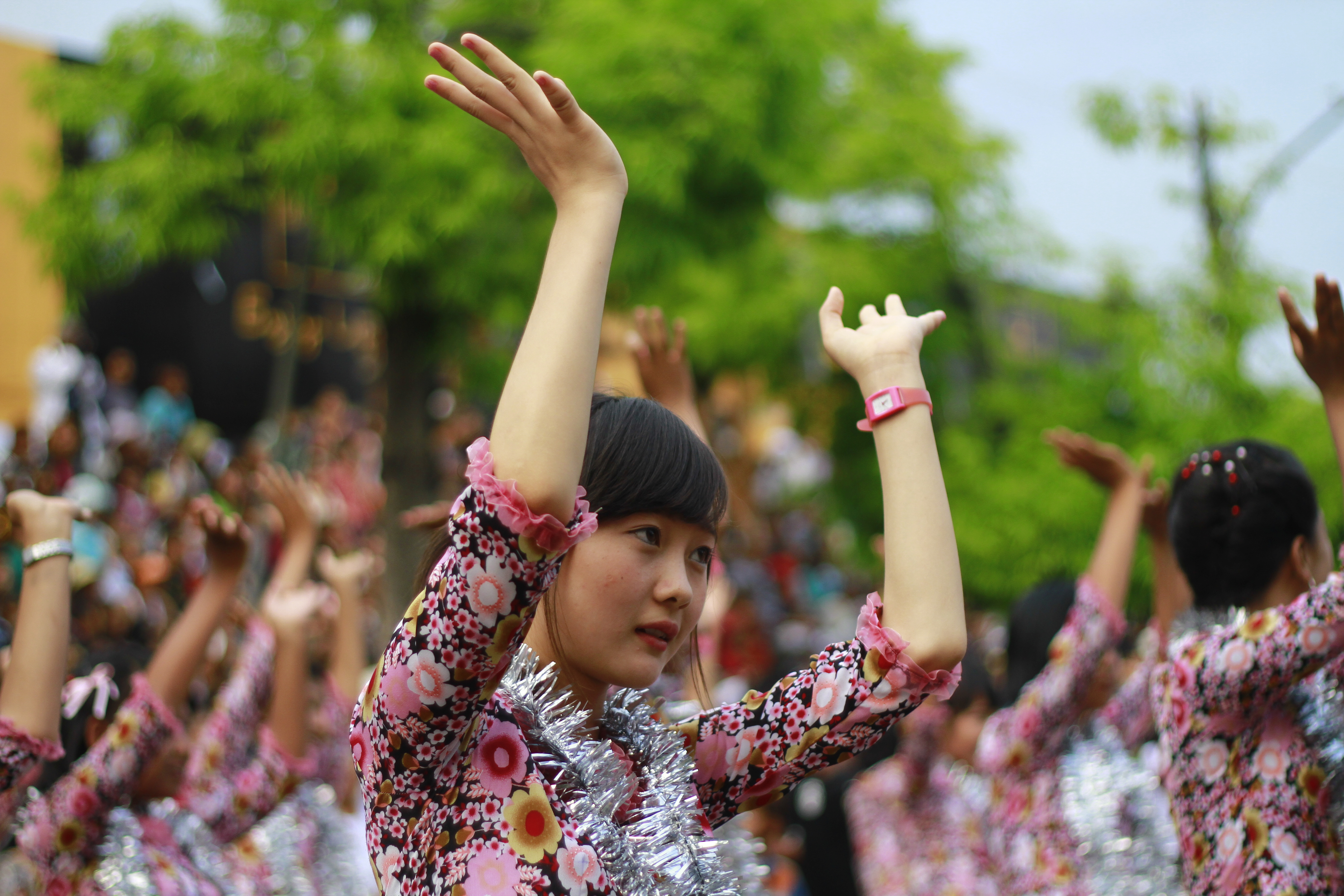
Young students perform traditional Burmese Dance during opening ceremony of Thingyan Water Festival at Mandalay City Hall in Mandalay, Myanmar on 12 April 2012.

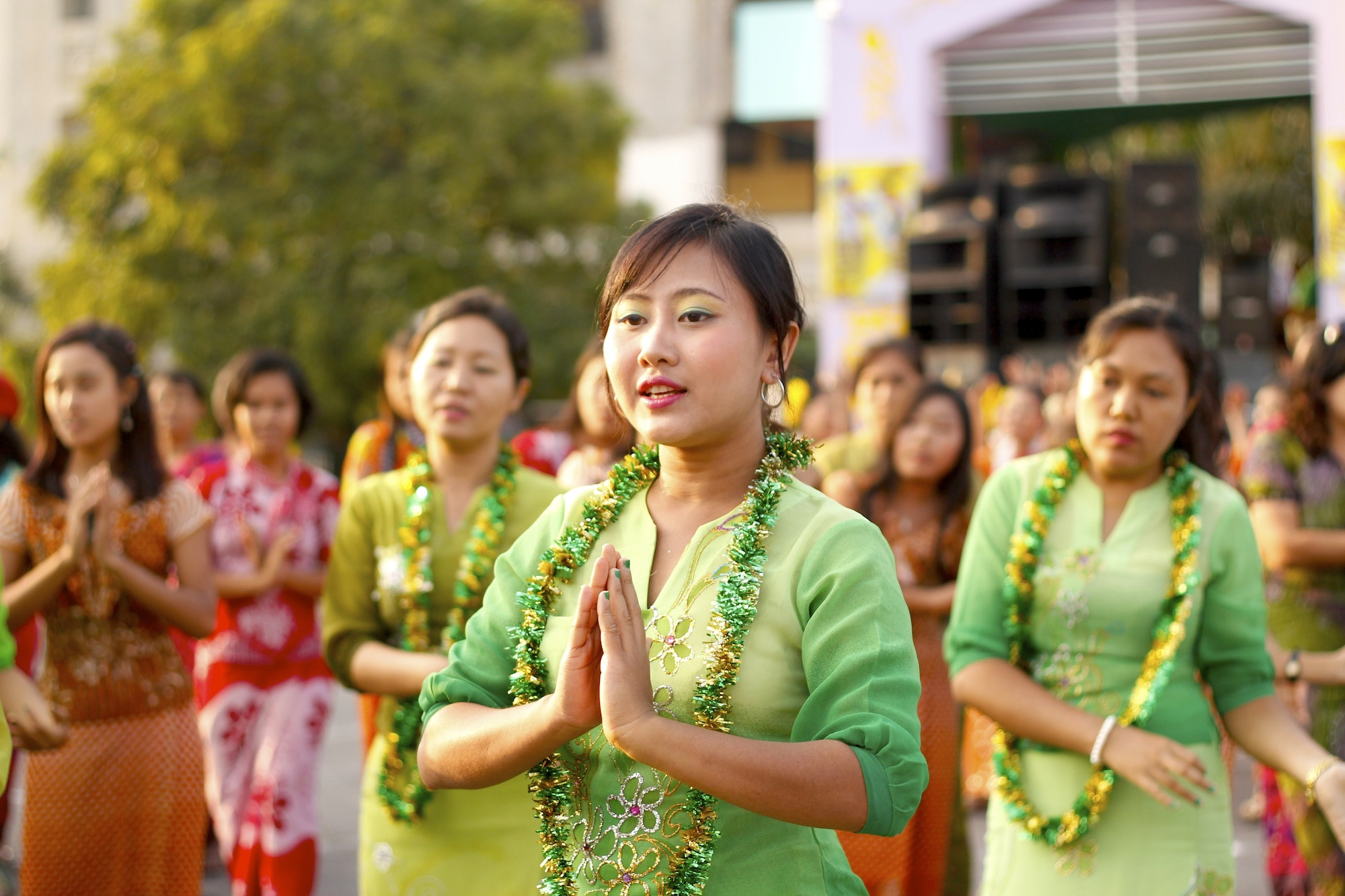
Burmese girls perform traditional dance during closing ceremony of Myanmar New Year Water Festival 2011 in Yangon, Myanmar on 16 April 2011.

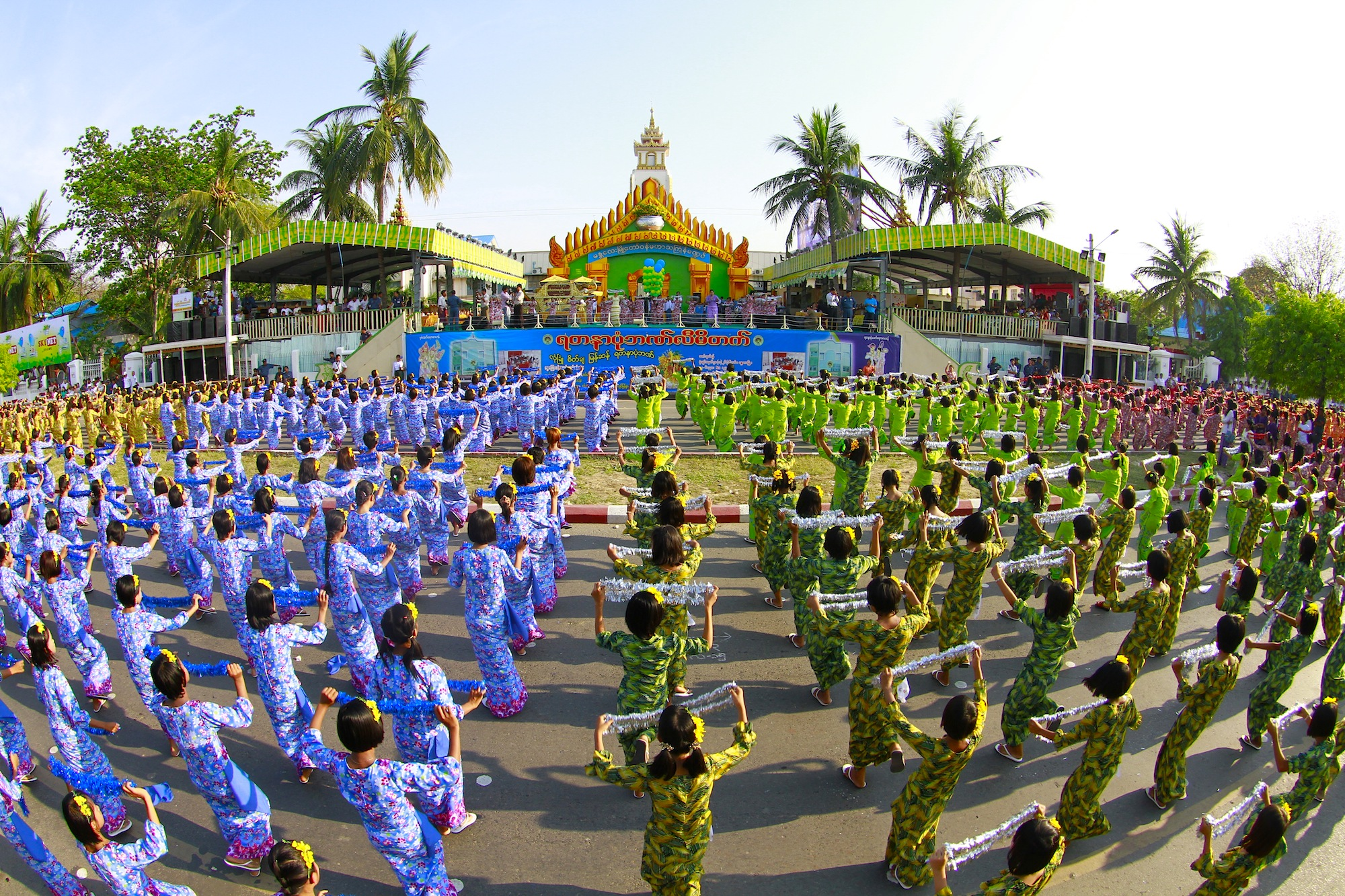
Young students wear Burmese dress and perform traditional dance during rehearsal for the opening ceremony of Mandalay City Hall Thingyan Water Festival 2012 in Mandalay, Myanmar on 10 April 2012.

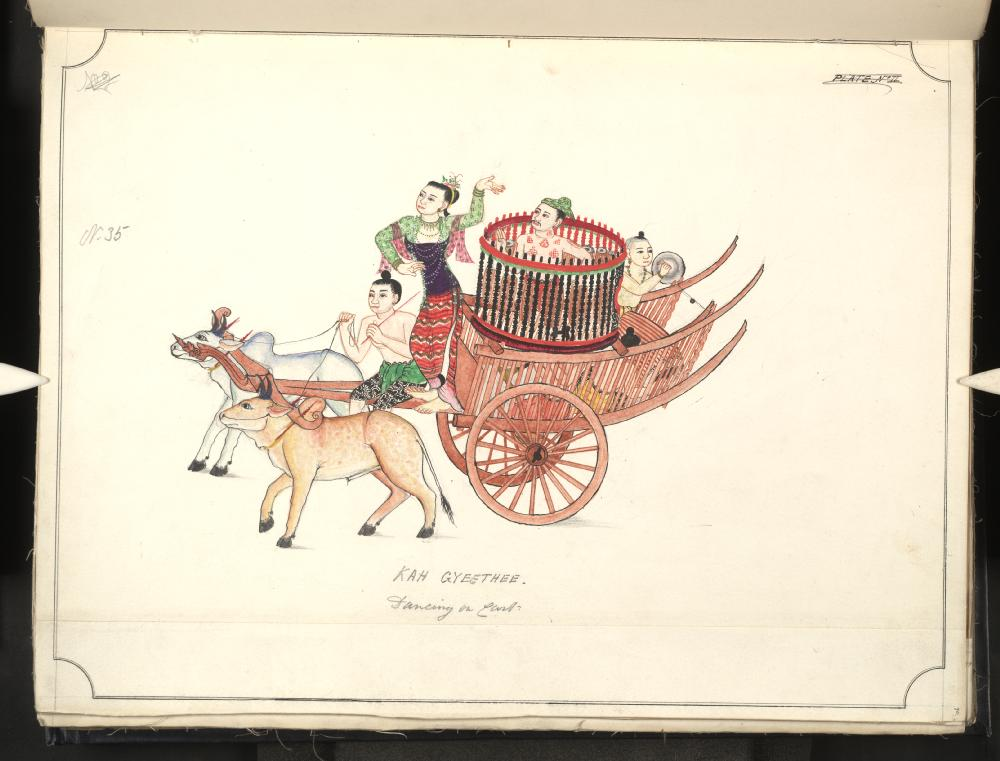
Dancer on a cart with musicians: 19th century watercolour

== See also ==
- Culture of Myanmar
