= List of Burmese film directors =

A list of film directors and DVD movies directors who work in the Cinema of Burma:

== A ==
- Aung Pwint

== K ==
- Kyaw Thu
- Kyi Soe Htun
- Kyi Phyu Shin

== L ==
- Lu Min

== M ==
- Maung Maung Ta
- Maung Wunna
- Midi Z
- Min Min Hein
- Myint Aung

== S ==
- Sein Lyan Htun

== T ==
- Thu Kha
- Tin Maung

== W ==
- Win Oo
- Wyne (Own Creator)

== Z ==
- Zarganar
- Zin Yaw Maung Maung
