= May Thit =

Burmese actress and singer (1925–2001)

Wunna Kyawhtin May Thit
- မေသစ်
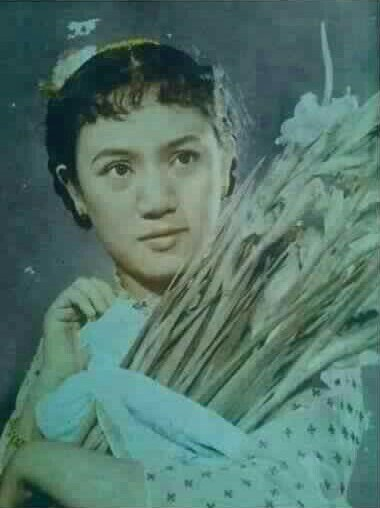
- May Thit in 1958
- Born: Khin Thit; 1925; Bago, Bago Region, British Burma
- Died: 30 September 2001 (aged 75–76); Yangon, Myanmar
- Occupations: Actress, singer
- Years active: 1940–1991
- Spouses: U Ko Ko; U Win
- Awards: Wunna Kyawhtin (1958); Myanmar Motion Picture Academy Awards (Best Actress Award for 1960, Best Supporting Actress Award for 1964, 1976)

May Thit (Burmese: မေသစ်; born Khin Thit 1925 – 2001) was a Burmese actress and singer. She won Best Actress Award for 1960, Best Supporting Actress Award for 1964 and 1976 in Myanmar Motion Picture Academy Awards. She was famous around between 1950s and 1990s.

== Early life ==
May Thit was born on 1925 to parents, Municipal Officer, U Ko Ko Gyi and Daw Than Shwe in Bago, British Burma. She studied education until middle school. May Thit dropped out of school after graduating from middle school because she was more interested in film art than education. She applied for a job as a hobby film actress at A1 Film Company. A1 Film Company had chosen May Thit as the new film actress. She became a film actress under the name 'May Thit' given by A1 Film Company from her original name Khin Thit. May Thit was only 16 years old at the time.

== Career ==
Ma Thet had not been allowed to star in a movie for the first time, but she had only acted as a supporting actress. She made her debut in the silent film Thunder directed by Ba Shin alongside Nyunt Maung, May Nu, May Myint Myint Swe, Thar Gaung, Saing Tin and entered the film industry as a first step. She was cast for the second time in the sound film Chit Yay Sin directed by Tin Maung alongside Tin Maung, May Shin, Yin Yin Shwe, Thar Gaung, Ba Shin, Gyan Sein, Aung Gyi, Shwae Gyi.

She co-starred in the silent film Kay Lar Tha directed by Chin Sein alongside Aye Kyu, May Nu, Aung Gyi, Saing Tin and Bo Thaung for the third time. This film was premiered in Bayin Cinema on 10 January 1941. Then, she co-starred in the film Mar Na Shin directed by Ba Shin alongside Chit Shwe, May Shin, Gyan Sein, Ba Shin and Maung Than Sein. She co-starred in the film Chit Thway Hone directed by Chin Sein alongside Maung Maung Khin, May Myint, Shwe Nyar Maung, Yin Yin Shwe, Saing Tin and Aung Gyi.

When World War II broke out, the film industry ceased to exist. After the war, May Thit returned to school without returning to the film industry. While attending seventh grade at Daw Ami Private School in Insein, she was contacted by A1 Film Company and returned to A1 Film Company. Despite returning to A1 Film Company, she starred as the leading actress in the silent film Min Bar Lal directed by U Tin Yu from Electric Film Company alongside Tin Maung, Aye Kyu and Thar Gaung. Aye Kyu He co-starred with Tha Gaung. She also starred in the silent film Ba Ba Gyi directed by Tin Yu alongside Khin Maung, Aye Ko and Nyo Nyo. She starred as leading actress in the silent film Nyaung Yan Nyi Naung alongside Khin Maung, Aye Ko, Bo Thaung and Gyan Sein. She co-starred in the sound film Gon Yee Matu directed by Thukha alongside Thukha and Khin Maung for the electric film and May Thit became famous as Mal Thone and Pauk Si.

After that, she co-starred as the second actress in the sound film A Chain Tan Pyi, which premiered in Royal and Karhtay Cinemas on 6 November 1948 directed by Ba Shin alongside Tin Maung, May Shin, Gyan Sein, Thar Gaung and Shwae Gyi. May Thit's pitiful and compassionate voice won the hearts of audiences and made her famous again.

Then she starred as leading actress in the silent films Yan Pon Khwin and Thu Htay Laung directed by Tin Yu from Electric Film Company.

May Thit starred as the leading actress in the sound film Chit Mone Man, which premiered in Royal Cinema on 2 September 1949 directed by Tin Maung from A1 Film Company alongside Tin Maung, Thukha, Shwe Nyar Maung, Thar Gaung, U Htaw, Yan Pa and she became famous. She also starred in film Bu Ma Thi Ba Ma Thi directed by Aung Zan from A1 Film Company alongside Aye Kyu, May Nwet, May Mya, May Lwin and May San. She also starred in the film Wizaya, which premiered in Royal Cinema on 4 January 1952 directed by aung Zan alongside Aye Kyu, Gyan Sein and Thauk Kyar.

Then May Thit played the role of Hnin Yee, a painful forest girl in the sound film Myae Tae Thitsar directed by Mya Maung for the electric film alongside Zeya, Aye Kyu, Myint Myint Khin, Aye Kyu Gyi and she attracted the audiences with this film.

After leaving A1 Film Company, May Thit worked as a salaried actress in a British Burma Film Company on a three-year contract with Ks 500 per month.

She starred as leading actress in Ye Thway Ye Man, a silent film directed by Bo Han, A Chit San sound film directed by U Aung Gyi, The Saung Hayman, sound film directed by Thukha, Ma Mhe Tae Pan directed by Chit Khin, Phu Sar Hna Khaing, sound film directed by Hla Oo and Dr. Aung Kyaw Oo, sound film directed by Shwe Done Bi Aung for British Burma Film Company. After that, May Thit starred in the sound film Pan Thar Ma Sar Eu directed by Chin Sein from Pan Thar Film Company alongside Zeya.

She co-starred as a pitiful homeless student in the sound film Bawa Thanthayar directed by Thukha for Mandalay Film Company alongside Zeya, Aye Kyu, Thukha, Nwet Nwet Aye, Gyan Sein and proving to be a top actress.

She co-starred in the film Mya Pan Wutyi directed by Myo Aung for Mandalay Film Company alongside Myint Aung, Jolly Swe, Ba Chit, Nwet Nwet Aye, Mandalay Aung Gyi and Gyan Sein.

She starred in sound film Kyaw Tawt Hlay Thu Gyi directed by Tin Yu from Mya Zaw Film alongside Po Par Gyi, Myint Myint Htay, Win Zaw, Kyal Ni, Sein Khin, Gyan Sein, Myint Pe, Than Nwet, Khin Pyone Zin and Ba Thit.

She starred as a doctor in sound film Dr. Marlar, directed by Hla Maung, for Kaytumadi Film Company alongside Zeya, Aye Kyu, Saw Mu, Man Hla Pe, Thar Gaung and Saw Yin.

She starred as leading actress in sound films Thitsar Nae Myittar directed by Shwe Baw, Than Thar Lay Kan Tine directed by Aung Gyi, Chit A Nu Myu directed by Thukha, Chit Ngwet Ma Pyay directed by Wai Zin, Ma Khwae Tan Kyin Mal directed by Tin Yu, Lwan Tha Lay Maung Gyi directed by Tin Nyunt and Myittar Paing Shin directed by Thet Khine.

In 1958, the government awarded May Thit the title of Wunna Kyawhtin.

She also starred in sound film Myittar Shwe Yee directed by Mya Maung alongside Myint Aung, Ba Myint, Than Nwet, Yee Yee San, Myint Pe and then she won Best Actress Award in 1960 Myanmar Motion Picture Academy Awards for this film. She also won the 'Thurathati award', award of voting by the audiences for this film in 1960.

She also starred in sound film Yin Wal Ta Theint Theint directed by Shumawa U Kyaw alongside Yin Htway, San San Aye, May Nwet, Kyauk Lone, Khin Nyunt, Yin Kyi and then she won Best Supporting Actress Award in 1964 Myanmar Motion Picture Academy Awards for this film.

After won two film awards, she starred as leading actress in films Than Yaw Zin, Chit Thel Oo, Shwe Nyar Myay, B Za, Pwal Gyi Pwal Kaung, A Chit Nae A Pyit, May Kwet Ko Shar, Ta Nay TawvPyan Lar Mal, San Pwint Lar Pyi, A Shet Nae A Thet, Yay Myay Sone Tine, Myar Di Kar, Shwe Wah, Han Ko Pho, Thar, Ngwe Kyun, Pa Khan Ko Gyi Kyaw, Ya Lay Lone, Pan Taing Pwint Par Say, Ta Moe Ta Myay, Saing Thu Paing Thu, Sular Than Bawa, Mahar Than Bawa, Chit Hlaine Than, Chit Wingabar, Tint Hla Pay Han, The Ta Kwae Wal, Gon So Dar, Aung Myin Thaw Nay, Kyite Pyi, Hna Hmwar A Thel.

She also starred as supporting actress in films Myin San Say Chin The Hla Davi, A Pyaw Cho Tae A Pyo Chaw, Ywet Sein, San Yay Pa Mar Mi Myittar, Yone Ywae Kan Ywae, Yat Kyi Thu, Wa Yan Pyay Phoe Thein, Sein Nae Tay Zar, Ngwe, Chit Mone Man, Shwe Pyi Tan, Mhae Ta Pauk, Thway Mha Thatti Shi Thaw Kyaung, Nay Zar, Sanay Ma and Aung Pwal Nae A Tu Pyan Lar Mal.

She starred in film Nwet Myo Sone Lin Nwet Lite Chin directed by Htun Myint alongside Zaw Lin, Khin Thidar Htun, Myint Naing, Than Pe Lay, Sein Gyun Htun Shwe, Khin Ohn Myint and then she won Best Supporting Actress Award in 1976 Myanmar Motion Picture Academy Awards for this film. Then she starred in many films until 1990s.

== Personal life ==
She was married to Zayya Kyawhtin U Ko Ko, Retired Lieutenant Colonel and they got two son; named Ko Ko Oo, Ko Ko Latt and a daughter; named Win Yee. After divorcing U Ko Ko, she was married again to U Win, Regional Religious Officer.

== Death ==
She died on 30 September 2001 at 4:25 pm at Sakura Hospital, Yangon, Myanmar.
