= Nagani =

Nagani may refer to:

- "Nagani" (song)
- Nagani Book Club
