= Khun Hna Sin A Lwan =

1990 Burmese Film

- poster
- Burmese: ခုနှစ်စဉ်အလွမ်း
- Directed by: Maung Wunna
- Based on: Khun Hna Sin A Lwan by Min Lu
- Starring: Thu Maung; Khin Than Nu
- Edited by: Ko Ko (MDY)
- Music by: Sandayar Hla Htut
- Production company: Pan Wai Wai Film
- Release date: 1990
- Running time: 111 minutes
- Country: Myanmar
- Language: Burmese

Khun Hna Sin A Lwan (Burmese: ခုနှစ်စဉ်အလွမ်း) is a 1990 Burmese black-and-white drama film, directed by Maung Wunna starring Thu Maung and Khin Than Nu. Maung Wunna won the Best Director Award, Thu Maung won the Best Actor Award and Khin Than Nu won the Best Actress Award in 1990 Myanmar Motion Picture Academy Awards for this film.

== Cast ==
- Thu Maung as Myat Htun
- Khin Than Nu as Khin Mi
- Zaw Lin as Wai Lin
- Su Hlaing Hnin as Khine Mar Mar

== Awards ==
Year	Award	Category	Nominee	Result
1990	Myanmar Motion Picture Academy Awards	Best Director	Maung Wunna	Won
1990	Myanmar Motion Picture Academy Awards	Best Actor	Thu Maung	Won
1990	Myanmar Motion Picture Academy Awards	Best Actress	Khin Than Nu	Won
