= Khin Maung Yin =

Burmese actor and singer (1902–1946)

- ခင်မောင်ရင်
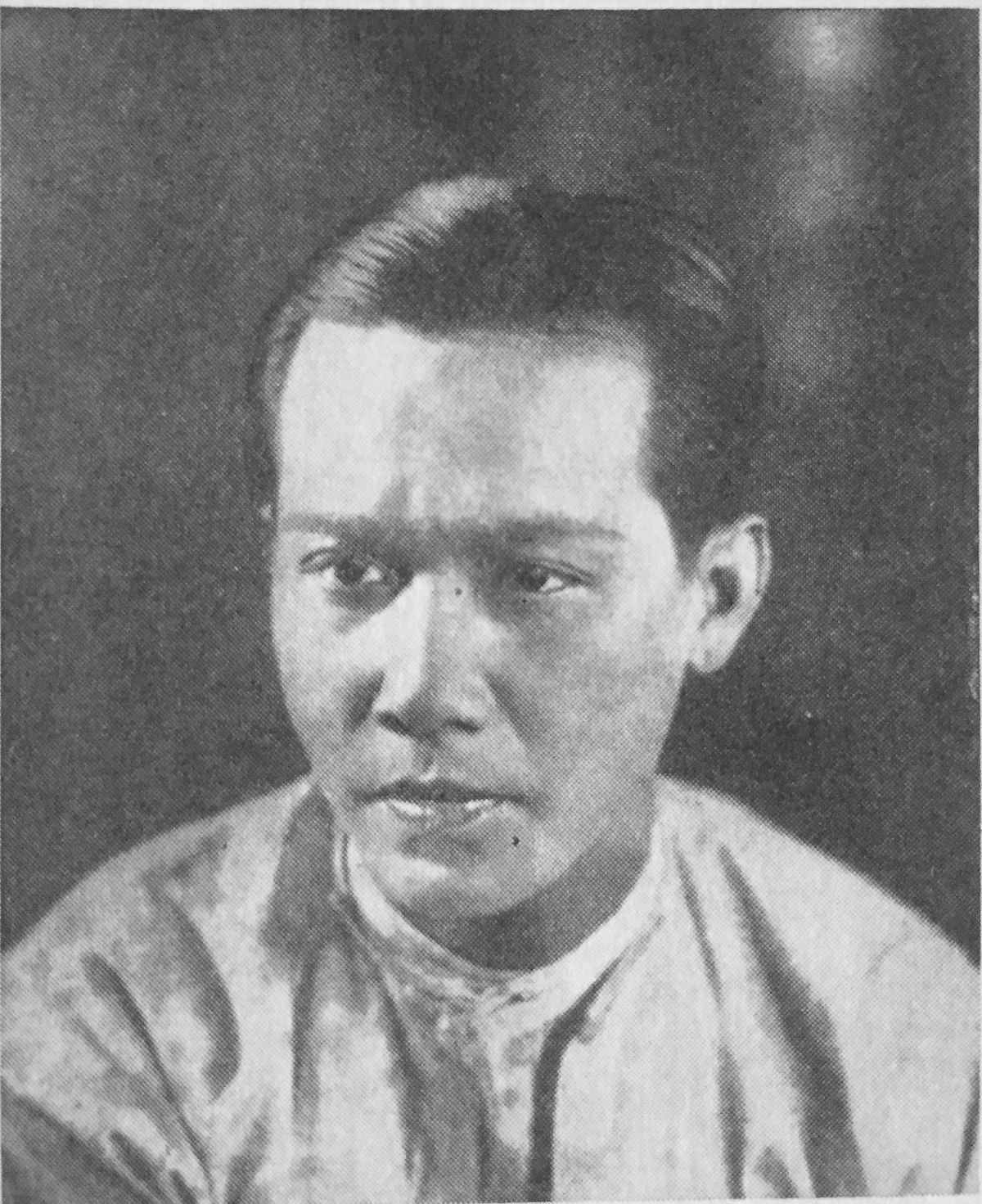
- Born: Maung Tin; 1902; Ma-ubin, Irrawaddy Division, British Burma
- Died: 1946 (aged 43–44); Ma-ubin, Irrawaddy Division, British Burma
- Occupations: Actor; singer
- Notable work: Bo Aung Din
- Spouse: Than Than
- Parents: U Kyaw Hla (father); Daw Thaung May (mother)

Khin Maung Yin (Burmese: ခင်မောင်ရင်; born Maung Tin 1902–1946) was a Burmese actor and singer. He is best known for starring in film Bo Aung Din (1941) as the character Bo Aung Din.

== Early life ==
Khin Maung Yin was born in Ma-ubin, Irrawaddy Division, British Burma in 1902 to U Kyaw Hla and Daw Thaung May. He was the eldest of five siblings.

He was still in high school in Ma-ubin when he participated in the First Nationwide Student Protests against the British in 1920. He then continued his education at Mandalay National High School and the Wesleyan Missionary School.

== Career ==
After high school, he worked as a teacher at the National School in Yezagyo.

After that, he worked for 10 years at the Lithographic Department of Rangoon Government Printing Press. It was then that he became acquainted with Ba Nyein, the owner of the Burma Photo Play Film Company. He made his acting debut in the film Ekapāduka (ဧကပါဒုက) at the urging of Ba Nyein. Shortly after, he married Than Than.

Khin Maung Yin was a hit in his debut. He decided to pursue a film career, and quit his job. He starred in a number of silent films and sound films produced by British Burma Films, including Sun and Moon, Gold and Emerald (နေနှင့်လ ရွှေနှင့်မြ), Duty (ဝတ္တရား), Beloved (အချစ်ဆုံး), Bo Aung Din (ဗိုလ်အောင်ဒင်) and Moe Khaung Kyaw-Swa (မိုးခေါင်ကျော်စွာ), which was his last film.

Khin Maung Yin proved to be a good singer as well. His movie songs such as Setkya Thaik (စကြာသိုက်), Bo Bo Aung (ဘိုးဘိုးအောင်), Naga Ni (နဂါးနီ), Kuthawadi (ကုသဝတီ), Seikkan Tha (ဆိပ်ကမ်းသာ) are still popular today.

Khin Maung Yin sang not only contemporary songs but also traditional Burmese classical songs. He learned to sing Burmese classical music during his school days in Mandalay. He played several musical instruments but was most proficient with the violin.

When the Nagani Book Club was formed in 1937, Khin Maung Yin sang the song Nagani. He also enjoyed sports. While he was working at the government printing press, he played for the French Union football club.

In 1939, Khin Maung Yin left British Burma Films due to his deteriorating health. During World War II, he returned to Ma-ubin and stayed with her siblings. Khin Maung Yin died of typhoid fever in early 1946.

Khin Maung Yin's films and songs are still popular today.
