= The People Win Through =

1954 Burmese Film

- Burmese: လူထုအောင်သံ
- Directed by: Jobisite Jr.
- Screenplay by: Paul Ginglin
- Based on: The People Win Through Play (1951) by U Nu
- Produced by: Humat Moelin
- Starring: Bo Ba Ko; Maung Maung Ta; Hla Maung Lay; Htar Htar; Kyin Hla
- Production company: Cascade Films
- Release date: February 12, 1954
- Running time: 121 minutes
- Country: Myanmar
- Language: Burmese

The People Win Through (Burmese: လူထုအောင်သံ) is a 1954 Burmese black-and-white political-drama film, directed by Jobisite Jr. starring Bo Ba Ko, Maung Maung Ta, Hla Maung Lay, Htar Htar and Kyin Hla. It was based on the popular play The People Win Through, written by U Nu.

== Cast ==
- Bo Ba Ko as Aung Win
- Maung Maung Ta as Aye Maung
- Hla Maung Lay as Bo Tauk Htun
- Khin Maung Zaw as Mya Gyi
- Kyaw Thaung as U Thar Doon
- Ba Zin as U Ba Thein
- Thukha as U Bo Sate
- Jolly Swe as Hla Thaung
- Htar Htar as Khin Nwet
- Kyin Hla as Aye Tin
