= Myat Mon =

Burmese actress

- မြတ်မွန်
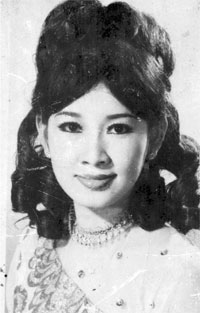
- Myat Mon
- Born: 1942 (age 83–84)
- Occupation: Film actress
- Notable work: Ka Gyi Yay Ka; The Milk Ogre
- Awards: Myanmar Motion Picture Academy Awards (1959)

Myat Mon (Burmese: မြတ်မွန်, pronounced [mjaʔ mʊ̀ɰ̃]; born 1942) is a Burmese actress who won the 1959 Academy Award in the film Ka Gyi Yay Ka.

== Early life and career ==
Myat Mon made her feature film debut when she was sixteen years old, taking on the leading role in Ka Gyi Yay Ka (1958) alongside Htun Wai. She experienced a rise in popularity and won the Myanmar Motion Picture Academy Awards in 1959. She appeared in Bae Pann Tha Loh Yin, Wearing Velvet Slippers under a Golden Umbrella, Shwe Pay Loh Ma Ya and Zar Khan Zi Nauk Kwe Hmar.

After starring in some films, Myat Mon withdrew from the film industry at the age of 32.

== Later days ==
Myat Mon made her film comeback in the 2019 film The Milk Ogre, alongside Lu Min, Zay Ye Htet and Shwe Hmone Yati, where her role became a hit at home and abroad, and led to further recognition.

== Personal life ==
She married Tha Du, the director of Ka Gyi Yay Ka. The couple had three children, artist Ah Yu, Kay Thi Mon and Mar Mar Mon. After divorcing Tha Du, she married an accordion player, Ohn Kyaw, and she gave birth to Thet Ngon Phoo, and Zarni Maung.

== Filmography ==
1. Ka Gyi Yay Ka (ကကြီးရေက)
2. Ahngo Lwe Thi (အငိုလွယ်သည်)
3. Èthe (ဧည့်သည်)
4. Akeywetha (အကယ်၍သာ)
5. Apyay (အဖြေ)
6. First Class (ဖတ်စကလပ်)
7. Bae Pann Tha Loh Yin (ဘယ်ပန်းသာလို့ယဉ်)
8. Tawun (တာဝန်)
9. Thine Thama (သိုင်းသမား)
10. Wearing Velvet Slippers under a Golden Umbrella (ကတ္တီပါဖိနပ်စီး ရွှေထီးဆောင်း)
11. Pushsa Hsan Thaw Meinkale (ပုစ္ဆာဆန်သောမိန်းကလေး)
12. Nganyi Ngamyay Ngaamay (ငါ့ညီ ငါ့မြေ ငါ့အမေ)
13. Chit Thu Thant Thant Khant Khant Chaw (ချစ်သူသန့်သန့်ခန့်ခန့်ချော)
14. Phan Pya Khwet Nae Kyauk Set Yay (ဖန်ပြာခွက်နဲ့ကျောက်စက်ရေ)
15. Shwe Pay Loh Maya (ရွှေပေးလို့မရ)
16. Zar Khan Zi Nauk Kwe Hmar (ဇာခန်းဆီးနောက်ကွယ်မှာ)
17. Thet Htar So Thaw Meinma Chaw (သက်ထားဆိုသော မိန်းမချော)
18. Wathanako Matanae Shin (ဝါသနာကိုမတားနဲ့ရှင်)
19. Chit Yeeza (ချစ်ရည်းစား)
20. The Milk Ogre (နို့ဘီလူး)

== Awards and nominations ==
Year	Award	Category	Nominated work	Result
1959	Myanmar Motion Picture Academy Awards	Best Actress	Ka Gyi Yay Ka	Won
