= Mary Myint =

Burmese film actress, theatre actress, singer and writer (1929 – 1957)

- မေရီမြင့်
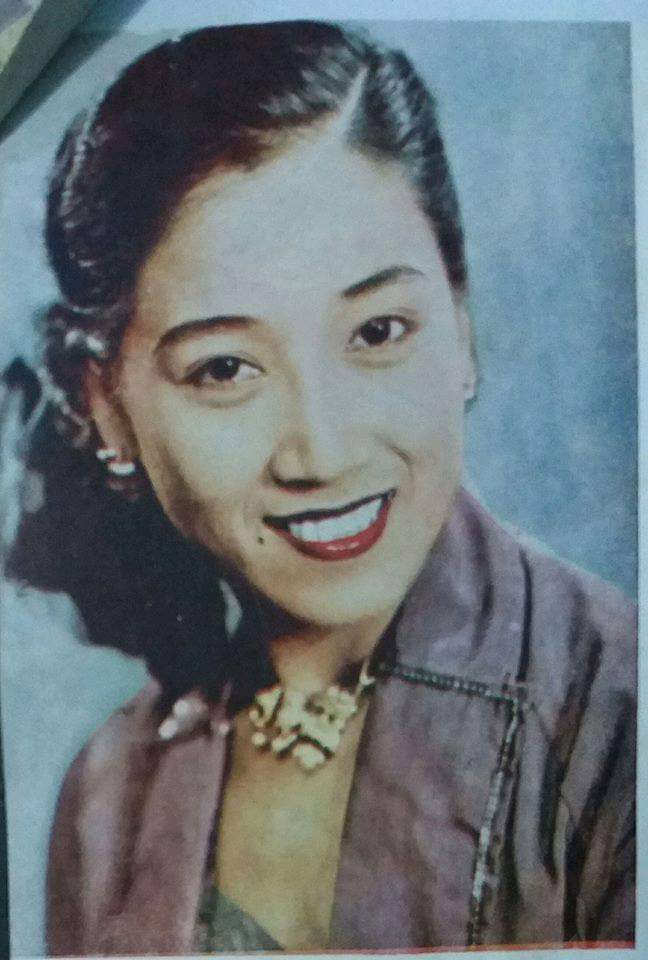
- Born: Ae San; 5 March 1929; Namhkam, British Burma
- Died: 6 May 1957 (aged 28); Rangoon, Burma
- Other names: Thein Shin
- Occupations: Film actress, theatre actress, singer, writer
- Years active: 1951–1957
- Spouse: Captain Min Oo (m. 1955; died 1957)
- Parent(s): U Sai Lone Kham Hein (father); Daw Nan Sui Khat Kham (mother)
- Relatives: Nan Shwe Win (sister); Sai Aik Htun (brother)
- Awards: Shanghai beauty queen (1947)

Mary Myint (Burmese: မေရီမြင့်; born Ae San, 5 March 1929 – 6 May 1957) was a Burmese film actress, theatre actress, singer and writer. She acted as leading actress in 47 Burmese films. She was famous around the 1950s.

== Early life ==
Mary Myint was born on 5 March 1929 to parents, U Sai Lone Kham Hein and Daw Nan Sui Khat Kham in Namhkam, Shan State, British Burma. She was youngest of three siblings. She had a brother, named Sai Aik Htun and a sister, named Nan Shwe Win.

When her parents of the merchants moved to Namtu, she became intimate friends with Khin Phone Tint who lived in the same quarter and became interested in literature.

She attended Indigenous Burmese Middle School in Sayar Myo and learned English from Kindergarten. She performed at school dances and community dances until the seventh grade. Parents also encourage it.

When the war broke out in 1943, they fled to Mansan village, 14 miles from Namtu. In 1945, she moved to China, Shanghai with aunt Khun Nan Nwe and her husband named Namtu Mining Manager Abajet.

== Career ==
She attended a make-up and hairdressing course in Shanghai. She also attended a Korean-run Western Dance Training College and received a diploma.

At the urging of a Korean teacher, she entered the 1947 Shanghai Beauty Pageant and won it. She lived in Shanghai until 1949.

On her return to Namtu from Shanghai, she descended to Rangoon to enter the art world. In Rangoon, she applied work as the actress to A1 Film Company while she was staying at the home of Daw Khin Phone Tint, who was as close as a sister. She could not speak Burmese fluently and A1 Film Company was not accepted for the Burmese sound film.

Then, through the director Shwe Done Bi Aung, she got involved with Win Win Theater. Tekkatho Myo Chit acted as an admiral, Khin Ohn Myint acted as an Indian and she acted as a Chinese girl under the name Shanghai beauty queen May One in the play "Thitsar Pan Hna Khaing".

Later, she renamed to Khin San Myint and Mary Myint, chosen by Shwe Done Bi Aung. Shanghai Beauty Mary Myint has been confirmed. She performed thirty plays. She practiced speaking fluently and became fluent in Burmese. The song 'Shwe Lal Daing' composed by Alinka Kyaw Swa Shwe Pyi Aye was sung by Mary Myint herself in the film Pin Myint Mar Lar which was written and directed by Aung Tha Pyay Film Company. This song was sung by Kyi Kyi Htay in early and Tin Tin Mu sang in Win Oo 's film Mone May Par Naing.

She learned to write from Saw Mon Nyin, a former teacher in Namtu. In Rangoon, she wrote short stories while living in a rented house with her cousin Nan Kham Phone. She wrote short stories such as "Cherry from Shan Thani", "Myaw Hlyat Myaw Sae", "Kyway Lwint Cherry" and "Mann Shwe Nwe Wai Yee" under the pen name Saw Shin Mon and sent her short stories to the Yuwadi Journal published by Dagon Khin Khin Lay. She wrote the novel "Pin Myint Mar Lar" and she directed it as a film with actor Zeya and Shwe Ko.

A member of the Yuwadi Authors Association, Dagon Khin Khin Lay was worried that Mary Myint was renting a room, so she kept her a separate room on her Burmese-era Newspaper house. She also kept her writing joyful. Mary Myint and her sister, who was very young and earning a lot of money for acting, was asked by Dagon Khin Khin Lay to save money and buy a plot of land on Kyeemyindaing and Bahan Windamia Road. Mary Myint initially received only 3,000 kyats for acting, but later increased to 15,000. Acting fees of top actresses around 1960s were 20,000 kyats. The actors and actresses received the same acting fees in that time.

== Personal life ==
She met Captain Mya Hlaing, her audience, during the 1949 "Thitsar Pan Hna Khaing" play and fell in love with her.

After parting ways with Captain Mya Hlaing, she fell in love with actor Khin Maung Kyi, who entered the theater world in 1951. But Khin Maung Kyi did not live long.

In 1953, she met Captain Min Oo, who was serving in the Navy (Pathein) at the Win Win Theater and fell in love. They got married on 23 April 1955 and moved to Shwela Win Road, Sanchaung Township.

== Death ==
Mary Myint felt an ectopic pregnancy and underwent surgery on 25 April 1957 in Sanpya Clinic. However, she remained in good health until 10 a.m. on 6 May, but died of pneumonia on 6 May 1957, at 3:30 p.m.

Mary Myint's body was transported to Rangoon General Hospital in a naval vehicle, where it was stored in the freezer and embalmed.

The body of Mary Myint was taken from the hospital on the morning of 7 May 1957 by the Film Theater Association and her body was prepared at the Thayet Taw Brick Staircase Monastery in Rangoon, and was taken to the Kyantaw Cemetery on 8 May 1957 for burial.

At the time of her death, she was still working on the film Maya Kyar Chi by director Nya Na from Padetha Film Company.

It was four days before the screening of the film Dr. Aung Kyaw Oo. She was only 28 years old at the time of her death.
