= Tender Are the Feet =

Tender are the Feet
- Original poster by Bagyi Aung Soe
- Directed by: Maung Wunna
- Written by: Aung Lin (novel); Min Shin (screenplay)
- Produced by: Min Lwin
- Starring: San San Aye; Zaw Lwin
- Cinematography: Maung Soe
- Edited by: Maung Wunna
- Music by: Master Thein; Sein Bo Tint
- Distributed by: Min Lwin Films
- Release date: 12 October 1973 (Myanmar)
- Running time: 106 minutes
- Country: Myanmar
- Language: Burmese

Tender are the Feet (Burmese: ခြေဖဝါးတော်နုနု, Pronounced as Ché Phawa Daw Nu Nu) is a 1973 Burmese film directed by Maung Wunna. After 42 years of regional release, the film was premiered at the Forum section of the 64th Berlin Film Festival in February 2014.

== Plot ==
Sein Lin (Zaw Lwin) is the drummer for a traditional Burmese dance theater group in Rangoon, who is very passionate about Burmese music, art and cultural traditions. He gets frustrated when, in his opinion, one of the dancers dances against—not with—the beat, and he turns his back on his troupe, only to join another soon after, where he meet and falls in love with beautiful dancer Khin San (San San Aye). Yet Khin San is at first affronted by Sein Lin's teachings. Although they argue incessantly, they cannot deny their attraction for one another. When she leaves the group to pursue a career as a film actress, he gives her a small figure as a keepsake, a symbol of traditional theater. He tells her to return it only when she is certain she wants to stay in film. After celebrating her first cinema successes and deciding to marry producer Hla Tun (Aung Pyae), Khin San finally gives the figure back to the heart-broken Sein Lin. The story takes a different turn however when Khin San realizes that Hla Tun has been keeping something significant from her, and she returns to her traveling theater group.

== Cast ==
- San San Aye as Khin San
- Zaw Lwin as Sein Lin
- Aung Pyae as Hla Tun
- May Nwè as Daw Khyu, Khin San's mother
- Aung Soe as Owner of theater group

== Restoration and international premiere ==
The film was restored by the Yangon Film School with the support of Goethe-Institut and screened at Wathann Film Fest in 2012. It had its international premiere at the 64th Berlin Film Festival in February 2014.
