= Thaung Tun =

Thaung Tun may refer to:

- Thaung Tun (filmmaker)
- Thaung Tun (politician)
