= Kyaw Swe (actor) =

Burmese actor and film director

- ကျော်ဆွေ
- Born: Maw Ni; 10 February 1924; Rangoon, British Burma
- Died: 15 August 1982 (aged 58); Rangoon, Burma
- Occupations: Actor, director
- Years active: 1945–1982
- Spouse: Nwe Nwe
- Children: Win Nwe Swe, Thet Ni Swe, Khaing Mar Kyaw, Win Maw Ni, Kyaw Swe Thet
- Parent(s): Ba Nit and Ohn Sein

Kyaw Swe (Burmese: ကျော်ဆွေ, pronounced [tɕɔ̀ sʰwè]; 10 February 1924 – 15 August 1982) was a Burmese actor and film director.

== Biography ==
Kyaw Swe was born Maw Ni in 1924 in Yangon to U Ba Nit and Daw Ohn Sein. He attended the St. John's High School, and during World War II he was chief of law in Bago. He joined BDA during the war. He entered into film around 1945. He became a film actor, changing his name to Kyaw Swe, and appeared in the film Saw Ya San Sha, a silent film, directed by Ba Shin. It was produced by the British-Burma Film company (later, "Nyunt Myanmar" ).

He moved to the A-One Film Company and he starred in the films of "Bogyoke", "Ta Thwe Ta Mya", and "Ahtauttaw" and "Chit Ye Baw" directed by Chin Sein (Shwe Nyar Maung). He also starred in "Bo Aung Din" and "Thar Bo Aung Din" directed by Shwe Don Bi Aung, "The Hsaung Hayman" directed by Thukha, "Phyay Yort Khway" directed by Chit Khin, "Min Aung Min Naung" directed by Aung Gyi and "Hpuza Nit Khine" directed by Hla Oo (Lu-Gyan Hla Maung Lay) for the British Burma Company.

In 1961, he went to Japan to study film-making. He established his own film company. His first directed film was "Pale Myetyay (Pearl Tear)” and he starred in that film, with actress Khin Yu May, a war film. He also directed "Chit Myitta, "Ma chu tar the", "The myat tar lane", "Sane". Between 1945 and 1982, he regularly worked as both a director and an actor. His last film is "Mwe Mwe chin Che Myin". He died on 15 August 1982. He was survived by his wife, Nwe Nwe, and five children.

== Filmography ==
- Saw Ya San Sha
- Bogyoke
- Ta Thwe Ta Mya
- Ahtauktaw
- Chit Ye Baw
- Son Bo Aung Din
- The Hsaung Hayman
- Phyay Yort Khway
- Min aung Min Naung
- Hpuza Nit Khine
- Pale Myetyay
- Chit Myitta
- Ma chu tar the
- the myat tar lane
- Sane
- Mwe Mwe chin Che Myin
- Thamudaya Thanyawzin (feat his own daughter)
- Poan Pamar
- Ta Char Gabar Ka Chitthu Ye

ิิิ่*Kya-nor Ne Ko Ba Kyaw

- Sein-ta-yit Mya-ta-yit
