= First Class (1966 film) =

1966 Burmese Film

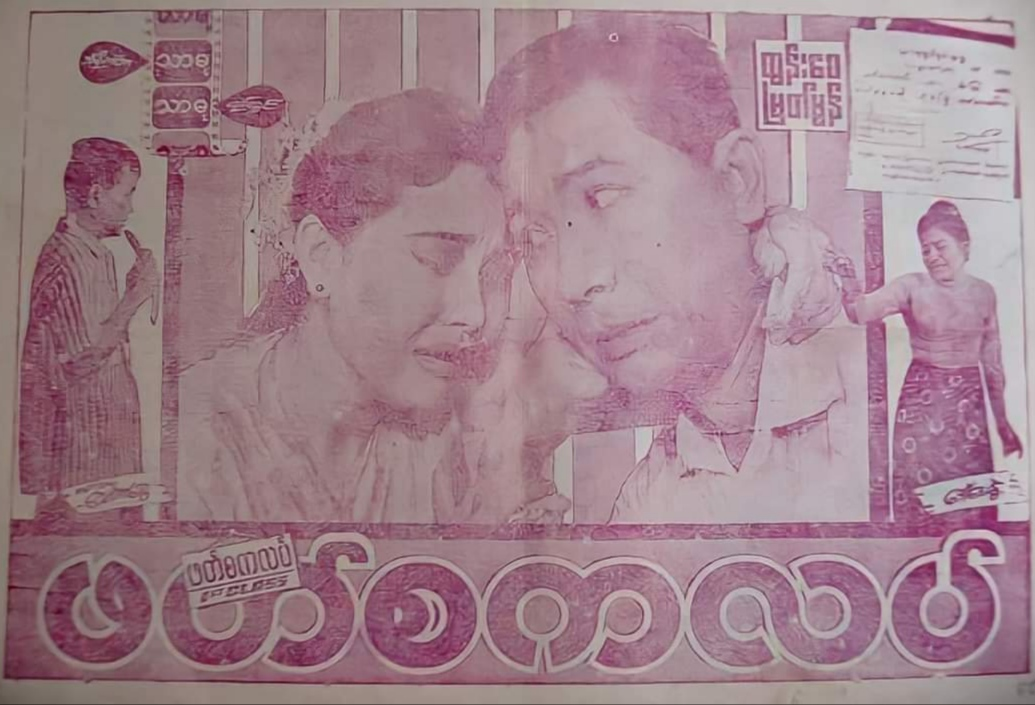
- Film Poster
- Burmese: ဖတ်စကလပ်
- Directed by: Tha Du
- Screenplay by: Tha Du
- Story by: Tha Du
- Starring: Htun Wai; Myat Mon; Thaw Ta Swe; May Nwet
- Cinematography: Aung Soe
- Edited by: San Htun; Ngwe Soe; Wunna
- Music by: Cho Tay Sett; Aung Koe
- Production company: Tha Du Films
- Release date: 1966
- Running time: 121 minutes
- Country: Myanmar
- Language: Burmese

First Class (Burmese: ဖတ်စကလပ်) is a 1966 Burmese black-and-white drama film, directed by Tha Du starring Htun Wai, Myat Mon, Thaw Ta Swe and May Nwet.

== Plot ==
A poor couple, Maung Htun (Htun Wai) and A Shwe (Myat Mon) received free first-class tickets to a film from a rich couple, Thaw Ta (Thaw Ta Swe) and Ma Nwet (May Nwet). To be able to present themselves well at first-class standards, they cost more than the usual ticket. A satirical comedy about people's hypocrisy and arrogance.

== Cast ==
- Htun Wai as Maung Htun
- Myat Mon as A Shwe
- Thaw Ta Swe as Thaw Ta
- May Nwet as Ma Nwet
- Kyi Maung as Kyi Maung
