= Pha Ta Lone Gaung Kyar =

1954 Burmese Film

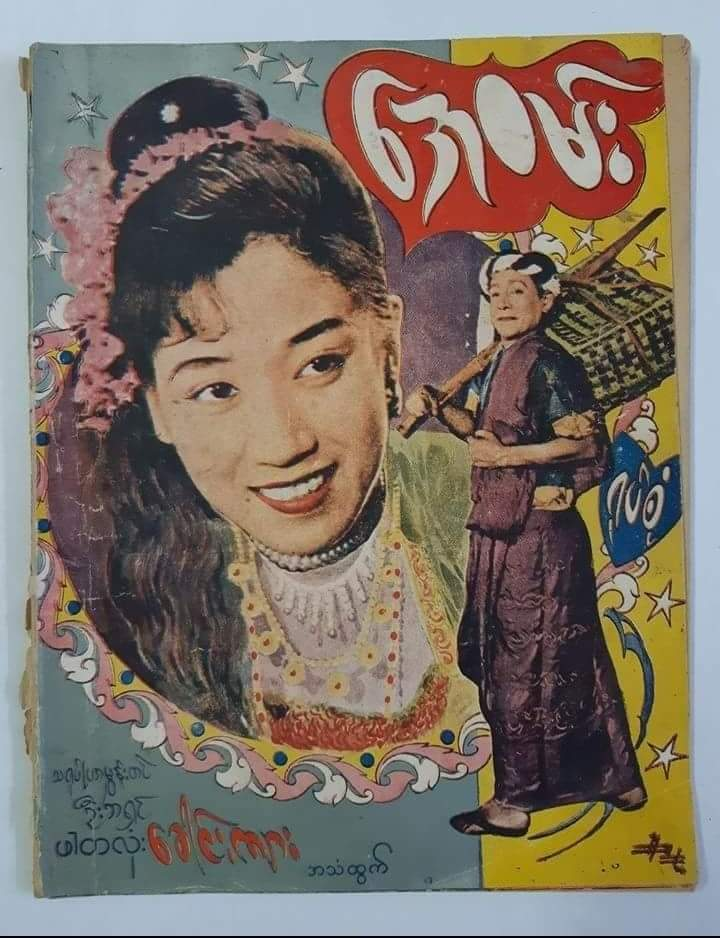
- Film poster
- Burmese: ဖာတစ်လုံးခေါင်းကျား
- Directed by: Ba Shin
- Starring: Khin Maung; Zeya; Mary Myint; May San
- Production company: A1 Film Company
- Release date: 1954
- Running time: 137 minutes
- Country: Myanmar
- Language: Burmese

Pha Ta Lone Gaung Kyar (Burmese: ဖာတစ်လုံးခေါင်းကျား) is a 1954 Burmese black-and-white drama film, directed by Ba Shin starring Khin Maung, Zeya, Mary Myint and May San.

== Cast ==
- Khin Maung as Thatoe Shein
- Zeya as Min Balu
- Mary Myint as Yu Pa Wadi
- May San as Mya Wutyi
- Maung Chit as Thatoe Saw
- Thar Gaung as Kaytumadi Minthar
