= Brahmaso Humanitarian Aid Organisation =

Humanitarian aid service in Myanmar

- ဗြဟ္မစိုရ် လူမူ့ကူညီရေးအသင်း
- Formation: 7 May 1998; 28 years ago
- Headquarters: Mandalay, Myanmar
- Chairman: Than Htun Myint
- Vice-Chairman: Chit Htoo
- Vice-Chairman: Htay Win
- Secretary-General: Thant Sin
- Website: www.brahmaso.org

Brahmaso Humanitarian Aid Organisation (Burmese: ဗြဟ္မစိုရ် လူမူ့ကူညီရေးအသင်း; abbreviated BHAO) is a humanitarian aid organisation based on Mandalay, Myanmar. The organisation is Myanmar's oldest free funeral service organisation.

It was founded by Tikkha, the abbot of the Southern Salin Monastery in 1998, initially providing free funeral services. It has since expanded to providing health care services, as well as education and natural disaster relief services.

== See also ==
- Free Funeral Service Society
