= Wearing Velvet Slippers under a Golden Umbrella =

- Burmese film poster, designed by Bagyi Aung Soe.
- Directed by: Maung Wunna
- Written by: Maung Thara (novel); Maung Wunna (screenplay)
- Produced by: Thadu
- Starring: Myat Mon; Myat Lay; Thet Naung
- Cinematography: Maung Soe
- Edited by: Maung Wunna
- Music by: Sandayar Hla Htut, Sandayar Maung Ye Ngwe
- Distributed by: Tha Du Films
- Release date: 3 September 1970 (Myanmar)
- Running time: 133 minutes
- Country: Myanmar
- Language: Burmese

Wearing Velvet Slippers under a Golden Umbrella (Burmese: ကတ္တီပါ ဖိနပ်စီး ရွှေထီးဆောင်း, Pronounced as Katipa phanat see shwe htee hsaung) is a 1970 Burmese black & white film directed by Maung Wunna starring Myat Mon, Myat Lay and Thet Naung. The film was Maung Wunna's first feature as director and he also wrote the screenplay, based on the novel of the same name by Maung Thara.

== Plot ==
Dr. Kyi Thar (Myat Lay), who works at the intensive-care unit, Mental Health Hospital, Yangon, and the patient Ma Htar Htar (Myat Mon), an elder sister of a friend. They met for the very first time on his duty. Though the friend¹s family was from Mandalay, they came to Yangon, to Dr. Kyi Thar to take the medical treatment with great expectations. They were right as she was getting much better as time went by and in their relationship too. Both of them knew they were deeply in love, attached to each other without mentioning a thing. It was the patient, who tried to start a new beginning of their close relationship on the day they went out together. However, he severed relations with her against his will as he thought it was the best thing to do. He just tried to keep his morals as a doctor. But their separation left her with the feeling of deep hurt instead. She got worse when they met again after some time. The poor patient asked again her beloved doctor to go out together with a pat expression, "let's go out, anywhere!".

== Cast ==
- Myat Mon as Htar Htar
- Myat Lay as Kyi Thar
- Thet Naung as Kyaw Zaw
- Kyaw Min as Saw Myint
- May Myat Swe as Htun Htun

== Awards ==
- 1971 - Myanmar Motion Picture Academy Awards for Best Director (Maung Wunna)
