= Maung Maung Ta =

Burmese actor and politician

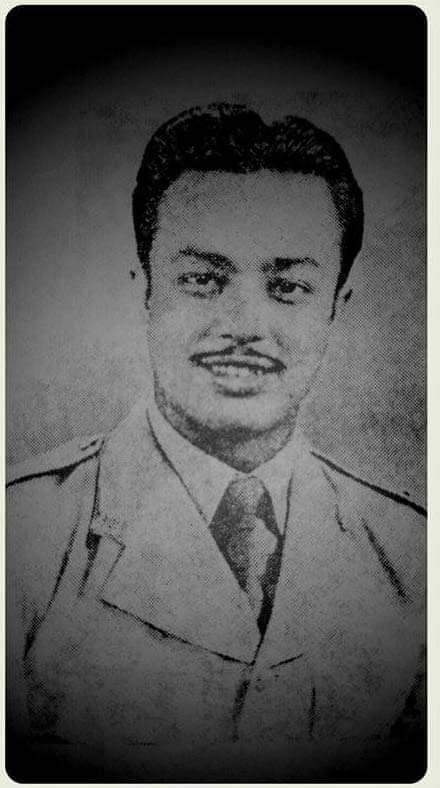
- Born: January 9, 1926; Mandalay, Upper Burma, British Burma
- Died: March 26, 2015 (aged 89); Yangon, Myanmar
- Citizenship: Myanmar
- Occupation: President of the All Myanmar Shia Muslim Organization
- Notable work: Dr. Aung Kyaw Oo
- Spouses: Hajee Bi Bi (after 1944) Sofia San Yu Maw (m. 2002)

Maung Maung Ta (born Mohammed Shafi Ata Sherazee haj 9 January 1926 – 26 March 2015) was a Burmese actor and politician.

== Biography ==
Maung Maung Ta's father, Khan Bahadur Hajee Gulam Hussain Sherazee, was consul for Persia in Burma (1929–1944), as was his grandfather, Khan Bahadur Aga Ali Akbar Sherazee (1910–1929). His secondary education ended in 1941, when the British presence withdrew to India. At that time, he was in the 10th Standard at St Peter's English High School in Mandalay.

=== Military service ===
He joined the Burma Independence Army in 1942.

He became a civilian attaché in 1943, serving as procurement officer within the Arms & Ammunition Department of General Aung San’s War Ministry, in Rangoon, Burma under Japanese Army occupation. He joined the resistance movement against the occupying forces as the Allies advanced into Burma.

Maung Maung Ta joined the post-independence Regular Burma Army in 1948 as a private soldier, then was commissioned in the field and became the Burma Army's first military administrator in the Insein District.

In 1950, Maung Maung Ta became an infantry and staff captain in the Burma Army. He attended the staff duty and administration training at the Burma Army Staff College arranged by the British Services Mission in Burma under Major-General Temple of the United Kingdom. Maung Maung Ta stood first in the Army Staff College Course Examinations of 1950 and for the year 1951.

In 1950, 2/Lt Maung Mg Ta attended Staff College Regimental Course with senior staff and infantry captains and stood first in administration and third in the exam.

=== Movie star ===
From 1955 to 1980 he was a successful actor starring in over 40 feature films. He visited Bombay including the RK Studios, and met Raj Kapoor and director Mehboob Khan who was then filming Mother India.

- 1954

Prime Minister U Nu's anti-communist play The People Win Through (Ludu Aung Than in Burmese) was turned into a feature film in 1954, produced by Cascade Pictures of Hollywood, directed by George Seitz (Jr) and filmed on location in Burma. The English version of the screen script was written by Paul Gangelin, president of the Writers Guild of Hollywood. It was June Rose Bellamy (Yadana Nat Mai) who introduced Maung Maung Ta to the Hollywood team. The cast were Thukha, Bo Ba Kho, Hla Maung Glay, Mya Gyi, Maung Maung Ta, Bo Tauk Tun, Thein Han Gyi, Bagyi, Ohn Mg, Hat Hat and Mai Tin. U Thukha, Maung Maung Ta and Hat Hat were alive till 2004. As of 2007, only Maung Maung Ta is alive.

Maung Maung Ta's debut into the Myanmar cinema industry was spectacular. Prime Minister U Nu himself appeared on the screen of The People Win Through. The premier show was attended by Mahn Win Maung, the third and last president of Burma, with Prime Minister U Nu and his Cabinet Ministers. Maung Maung Ta was seated between U Thant, then information secretary (later to become the UN secretary general) and Chan Htoon, the attorney general, both of whom had earlier accompanied Maung Maung Ta to introduce him to meet the prime minister after being chosen to play the lead role offered by Hollywood.

On the day of the premiere screening the city of Yangon witnessed the height of publicity with Burma Air Force planes littering the city with publicity pamphlets from the skies over-three major cities, viz., Yangon, Pegu and Prome, announcing the arrival and release of 165 copies of the feature film that had arrived from the US for simultaneous release all over the country. The film was a big political success and a blow to communism in Myanmar; it was arranged by the Committee for Free Asia, an American millionaire Association formed to keep communism away from South East Asia.

- 1955

U Nu appointed Maung Maung Ta, aged 26, to be 2nd Secretary at the Burmese Embassy in Washington, D.C., to accompany U Thant, the Burmese Ambassador to the US and later the United Nations Secretary General. He also advised him to quit the army, adding that a prime minister could not easily create an actor, but that he could, someday make him a diplomat with ambassadorial rank. On these assurances Maung Maung Ta chose to be an actor – a matinee idol – and to be an Ambassador later.

- 1956

Maung Maung Ta made his first film Dr Aung Kyaw Oo adapted from the Indian film Shole (with Ashok Kumar and Bina Rai). This Myanmar version won the annual Burma Film Academy Award for the year 1956.

- 1957

Graduated from the Burma School of Jour nalism. In the same year, the Motion Picture Council, Burma, chose him to represent Burma at the 1957 Asian Film Festival held in Manila, Philippines. Maung Maung Ta was received in audience by President Carlo Garcia at the Malacanang Palace ion Manila. He performed the tango on television with Philippine Actress Lita Gutierrez.

- 1958

He established a movie company in Mandalay, the Naypyidaw Film Co. The first production Mhyaw Ta Lint Lint – "Never Say Goodbye – was a top box office success for the year 1962. Maung Maung Ta directed/produced the only Indian movie produced in Yangon, titled “Pardesi Hisdustani", with a local Indian cast. It was a success.

- 1994

In 1994 Maung Maung Ta produced and directed a movie in Los Angeles titled “Love and Hate”, starring himself as the heart specialist Dr Arthur Maughan Ta, with his wife May acted by Ma Thida. The all Myanmar cast included five times Myanmar Academy Award winner Myint Myint Khin as the mother of the lead star Alex, acted by Ali Asgar. Also starring was the vocalist May Sweet and Ali Akbar as Alex's father. The English speaking movie with an all Myanmar cast with Thida Win and Mar Mar Aye in the cast was not permitted to be shown in Myanmar.

=== Political life ===
- 1962

Under Operation “White Elephant” General Ne Win, who had made a coup d'état upon the democratically elected government of Prime Minister U Nu, sent 1200 of the U Nu's supporters to jail custody, Maung Maung Ta was one of them. All detainees were kept for 14 months except for Maung Maung Ta, who was released by order of General Ne Win after two months.

- 1964-1966

As requested by ex Minister for Trade U Raschid and the hospital committee, Maung Maung Ta became the Chief Administrator in control of the Muslim Free Hospital in Barr Street, Rangoon. The Hospital was returned by him in a “better” shape to the Hospital Committee after 3 years sole management.

- 1972

Elected president of the All Myanmar Shia Muslim Organization on the decease of its president in 1971.

- 1973

Maung Maung Ta as president of the AMSMO plays host in Rangoon to Mr Innamullah Khan, the secretary general of the World Muslim Congress - Rabita.

- 1977

Elected vice president of the Islamic Religious Affairs Council (IRAC), Myanmar at its 9th Conference held in Myithkyina. He served at the CEC of the IRAC from 1977 till 1995.

As chairman of the “Islamic University Building Committee” he led a committee that collected enough funds to build an Islamic university in Yangon in 1977.

- 1978

Elected president, by the Holy Prophet Day Celebrations Central Committee, of three consecutive (1450-1452) “Yauman Nabi” years as chairman of the Birthday Celebrations. He is the only Shia Muslim to head a Sunni majority dominated committee in the history of the committee.

- 1979

Host to Hujjatul Islam Mohammed Ali Khatame, representative of Ayatollah Khomeini immediately after the Iranian Revolution.

- 1980

The visiting Brother General from Rome, Italy appointed the old St. Peterite student Maung Maung Ta the chairman of the St. John Baptist de La Salle Tercentenary Celebrations (1680-1980), Myanmar.

- 1983

In London, UK to become one of the Founder Members of the World Ahlul Bayt Islamic League, an Arab-based cover organization for the Shia Muslims of the world. Attended the inaugural conference held in August 1983 and other subsequent tri-annual conferences in London. Appointed by WABIL UK as the resident representative of WABIL in Myanmar.

Performed the Haj at Mecca, Saudi Arabia, together with 150000 Iranian pilgrims as a member of the Iranian Haj caravan at Mecca, with the permission of Ayatullah Kohe’Niha, its commander.

- 1985

Visited the US for the first time to attend daughter Zeenat's wedding. Received a Green Card and had his right eye operated in Los Angeles. Became a resident alien of the US as Resident Alien A 027195222.

- 1988

During the massive anti-government demonstrations and civil turmoil in 1988, he was elected to the Central Executive Committee of the League for Democracy and Peace, a political organization headed by the ex Prime Minister the U Nu.

- 1990

Stood for parliamentary election in 1990 from Mandalay under Myanmar's military regime.

- 1994

In London to attend the World Ahlul Bayt Islamic League conference (9th to 11th Sept.) after an eye surgical operation in California, United States. Invited to visit Iran, as guest of the Foreign Ministry, by Iran's Ambassador to Thailand and Myanmar in Bangkok.

- 1995

Ayatollah Ali Khamenei granted Maung Maung Ta an audience at the Presidential Office in Teheran on January 27.

- 2000

Diamond Jubilee birthday celebrations in Yangon with a lifelong achievement photo and video exhibition at the Mogul Hall, patronised by 8000 guests within 8 days. The materials displayed was vetted by the Myanmar government.

- 2001

Hospitalized on December 17 with “severe multiple gastric erosion’, “bleeding in stomach with melaena stool’, at Taw Win Hospital after he had fasted the full 30 days of Ramadan. 55 bottles of blood transfusion were given within seven days. Clinically dead twice. Discharged from hospital on 16 January 2002.

- 2003

Required by the Interreligious and International Federation for World Peace (IIFWP) to attend the Interreligious and International Peace Council (IIPC) conference in New York City on October 1–3, while the 58th General Assembly of the UN is taking place. Refused a visa to enter the US because of being designated a member of a terrorist organisation by the secretary, Department of Homeland Security

- 2004

Awarded the “Fellowship of the Dublin Metropolitan University of Ireland" in 2004 at aConvocation held in Yangon, Myanmar, on 15-6-2005.

Attended the second conference of the IIFWP/IIPC “World Culture of Hearts“ held on 23–27 July 2004 in Seoul.

Raised and donated a million Kyats to the Yangon General Hospital on 15-3-2004.

- 2005

Invited by Dublin Metropolitan University to travel to London in March 2005 and attend the convocation held at the Athenaeum in London on 29 March. Awarded a PhD from Dublin Metropolitan University; returned to Yangon from London on 17 April 2005. Upon his return he was immediately required to proceed to Bangkok, Thailand to attend two conferences within the same month: the Interreligious & International Peace Council (IIPC) (23–24 April) and United Nations 12th Congress on Crime Protection and Criminal Justice (19–25 May).

- 2006

As Ambassador for Peace (UPF-IIFWP) host to 250 guests of all religious faiths and diplomats at the Central Hotel in Yangon for the Peace and Dialogue Dinner with major communities in Yangon on April 29.

Attended one day “Interfaith Cooperation Seminar“ (Buddhist-Muslim dialogue) at Shalom, in Loikaw Centre, Yangon, Yangon 18 July 6, joined by delegates from Cambodia.

Attended The 3rd Assembly of the Universal Peace Federation, conference in Seoul, Korea (September 10–14).

== Spouses and children ==
Hajee Bi Bi (July 18, 1944-)
Eldest Daughter Zee Nat Mu Mu Ta, His Eldest Son Aung Thun Ta

Gloria Ma Khin Nwe and his sons Aung San Ta, Aung Win Ta, and His Favorite one - Artist and activist, Nay Min Ta(r)

Sofia San Yu Maw (August 30, 2002 – present)
He has ten children.

- Mona Maung Maung Ta (b. May 2004)(youngest daughter)
- Ali Zadeh (b. December 2005)(youngest son)

Maung Maung Ta died at age 90 on March 26, 2015, in Yangon, Myanmar.

== Awards ==
1. 2003: Ambassador for Peace, Interreligious and International Federation for World Peace
2. 2004: Crown of Peace award, IIFWP (USA)
3. 2004: Fellow of the Dublin Metropolitan University
4. 2005: PhD in London from the Dublin Metropolitan University,
5. 2006: Received the Hind Rattan Award in New Delhi in India on the eve of India's Independence Day, 2006.

== Filmography ==
1. 1954: The People Win Through (Lu Htu Aung Than)
2. 1957: Dr. Aung Kyaw Oo
3. 1958: Ei Lu Baung Twin

== See also ==
- Myanmar Motion Picture Museum
- List of Myanmar Motion Picture Academy Awards
