= May May Win =

Burmese actress and dancer

- မေမေဝင်း
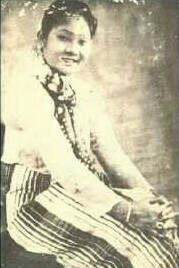
- Born: Khin Mya Mya; 1908; Ma Latto Village, Ma-ubin District, Irrawaddy Division, British Burma
- Died: April 17, 1981 (aged 72–73); Rangoon, Burma
- Occupation(s): Actress, dancer
- Notable work: Bo Aung Din
- Spouse: Maung Win
- Children: Baby Win
- Parent(s): U Pho Sein (father); Daw Aye Khin (mother)

May May Win (Burmese: မေမေဝင်း, born Khin Mya Mya; 1908–1981) was a Burmese actress and anyeint dancer. She is best known for starring in film Bo Aung Din (1941) as the character Ma Mya Win.

== Early life ==
May May Win was born in Ma Latto Village, Ma-ubin District, Irrawaddy Division, British Burma in 1908 to parents U Pho Sein and Daw Aye Khin. Her birth name is Khin Mya Mya.

== Career ==
=== Acting career ===
She started her acting career with a film Date Date Kyae directed by Sayar Khant and produced by United Att at a young age.

After collaborating with A1 Film Company, she has appeared under the name A1 Mya Mya in films such as Midnight (ညဉ့်ဦးယံ), Sein Shwe Shwe (စိမ်းရွှေရွှေ), Dway Nyi Naung (ဒွေးညီနောင်), Aung Pinlal (အောင်ပင်လယ်) and Helmet (သံခမောက်).

When the British Burma Film Company was looking for an actress to make films with sound, she moved to British Burma Film and started acted under the name May May Win in film Modernized Man (ခေတ်ဆန်သူ).

Beloved (အချစ်ဆုံး) and Bo Aung Din (ဗိုလ်အောင်ဒင်) film, directed by Chan Tun and produced by Nyunt Myanmar Film (formerly British Burma), was a huge success.

=== Ayeint dancer life ===
During World War II, she fled to her native village Malatto. After the war, she danced in Sein Aung Min's Zat Pwal (Myanmar Drama Event) in plays of earlier parts.

== Filmography ==
- Date Date Kyae (ဒိတ်ဒိတ်ကြဲ)
- Midnight (ညဉ့်ဦးယံ) (1933)
- Sein Shwe Shwe (စိမ်းရွှေရွှေ) (1934)
- Dway Nyi Naung (ဒွေးညီနောင်) (1934)
- Aung Pinlal (အောင်ပင်လယ်) (1934)
- Helmet (သံခမောက်) (1935)
- Modernized Man (ခေတ်ဆန်သူ) (1936)
- Boycotter (ဘွိုင်ကော့တာ) (1937)
- Flower Pagoda (ပန်းစေတီ)
- Sun and Moon (နေနှင့်လ)
- Taw Lay Wa (တော်လေးဝ)
- Our Relative (ဒို့အမျိုး)
- Bodyguard (ရံရွေတော်)
- Human Art (လောကီပညာ)
- Beloved (အချစ်ဆုံး ) (1939)
- Bo Aung Din (ဗိုလ်အောင်ဒင်) (1941)
- Son Bo Aung Din (သားဗိုလ်အောသ်ဒင်) (1955)

== Personal life ==
She came to Rangoon after she was marrying with Sheriff Maung Win at young age. They had a daughter Baby Win.

== Death ==
In 1981, April 17, Myanmar New Year's Day, she died in Rangoon, Myanmar.
