= Ei Lu Baung Twin =

1958 Burmese Film

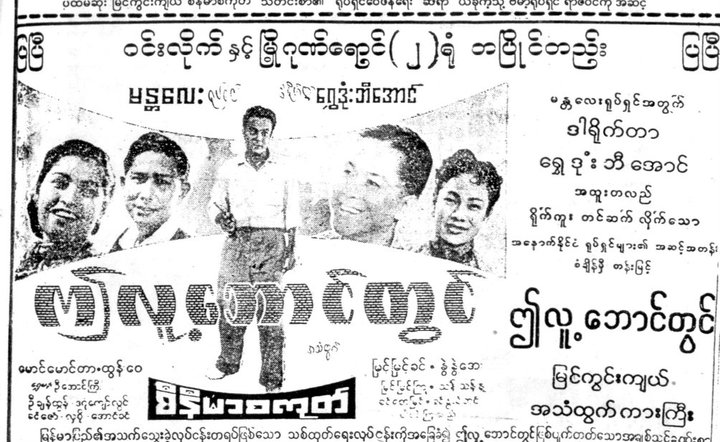
- Film poster
- Burmese: ဤလူ့ဘောင်တွင်
- Directed by: Shwe Done Bi Aung
- Starring: Htun Wai; Maung Maung Ta; Myint Myint Khin; Shwe Man Aung Gyi
- Music by: U Ba Thein
- Production company: Mandalay Films
- Release date: 1958
- Running time: 142 minutes
- Country: Myanmar
- Language: Burmese

Ei Lu Baung Twin (Burmese: ဤလူ့ဘောင်တွင်) is a 1958 Burmese black-and-white drama film, directed by Shwe Done Bi Aung starring Htun Wai, Maung Maung Ta, Myint Myint Khin and Shwe Man Aung Gyi.

== Cast ==
- Htun Wai as Thant Zin
- Maung Maung Ta as Ye Win
- Myint Myint Khin as Myint Myint
- Shwe Man Aung Gyi as Kyauk Lone
- Nwet Nwet Aye as Nwet Nwet Aye
- Than Than Nu as Ma Ma Gyi
