= Kyaiklat =

Town in Ayeyarwady Region, Myanmar

Kyaiklat ကျိုက်လတ်မြို့
- Town
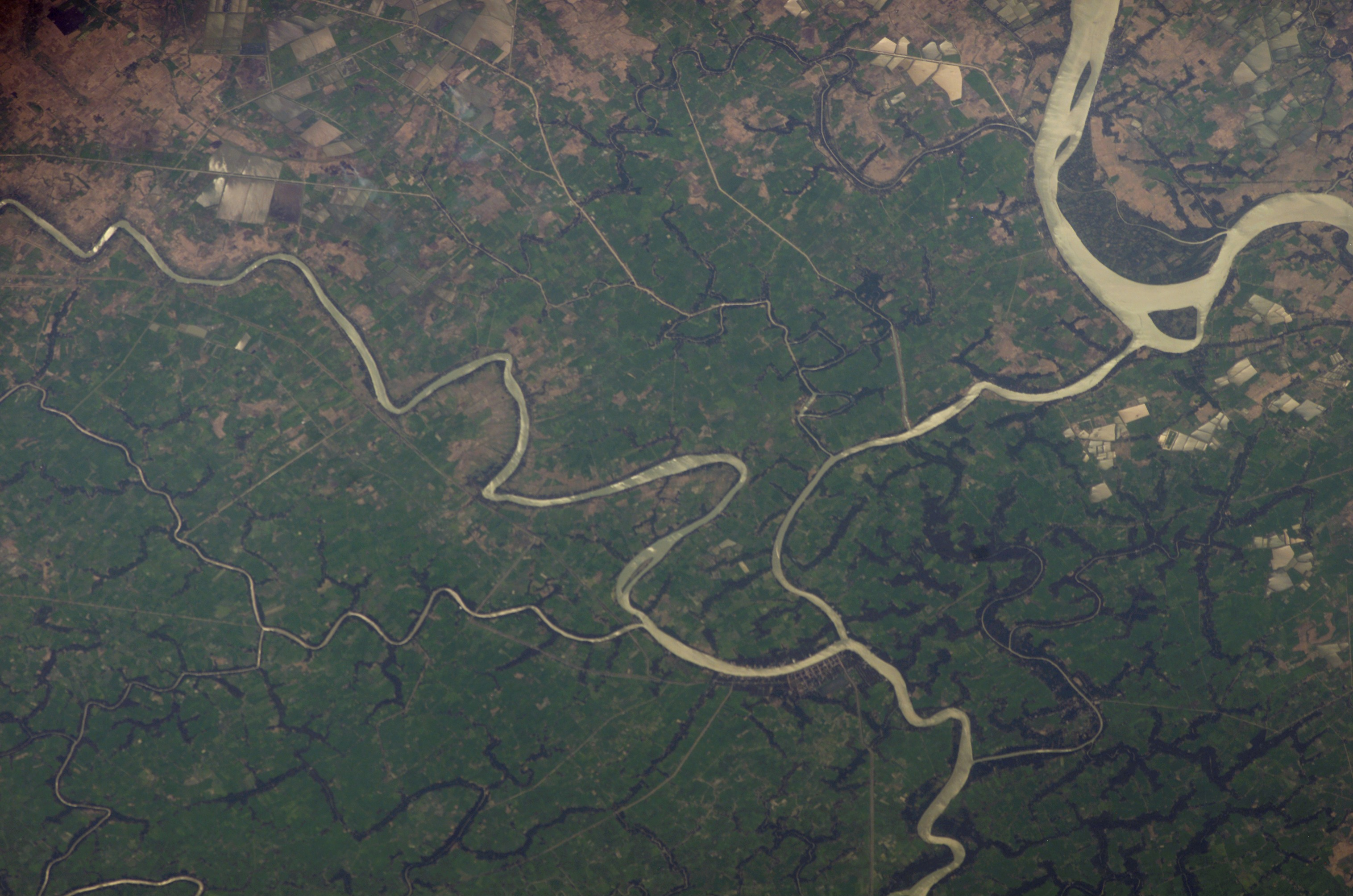
- View of Kyaiklat from the International Space Station
- Interactive map of Kyaiklat
- Coordinates: 16.447°N 95.723°E
- Country: Myanmar
- Region: Ayeyarwady Region
- District: Pyapon District
- Township: Kyaiklat Township

Area
  - Total: 1.22 sq mi (3.2 km^{2})
- Elevation: 10 ft (3.0 m)

Population (2019)
  - Total: 24,132
  - Density: 19,800/sq mi (7,640/km^{2})
- Time zone: UTC+6:30 (MMT)

Kyaiklat (Burmese: ကျိုက်လတ်မြို့) is a town in the Ayeyarwady Region of south-west Myanmar. It is the seat of the Kyaiklat Township in the Pyapon District. In 2019, it had 24,132 people.

The town is divided into six wards, simply numbered one through six. It is also the hometown of notable Burmese musicians.

== History ==
The town was settled in the 1840s by Mon refugees fleeing war further east. The settlers built a stupa 9 cubits tall close to the riverbed, but flooding and shifting deltaic flows caused the stupas to collapse soon after. The name of the town comes from a Mon phrase "Kyaik Lwoik" (Burmese: ကျိုက်လွိုက်) meaning Pagoda Toppled. The western part of the town was formerly Photaw Hill and was recorded to have several ponds and villages in the vicinity. After the Third Anglo-Burmese War, in 1887, the town was incorporated within the Thongwa District. The town's first mayor, a Mr. Maxwell, was appointed in 1882 by the British.

The late 19th century saw significant population growth as many moved in to farm the newly farmable rich deltaic soil. In the year 1900, a town committee was formed for Kyaiklat, and the municipality was officially incorporated in 1905. The town continued growing in the 20th century and received a high school and a hospital from the now independent Burmese government. As of the 1956 census, the town had a population of 15,790 people. In 2019, it had 24,132 people.

== Notable people and places ==
Kyaiklat is the hometown of several notable Burmese people, including Pyone Cho, Thukha, Dagon Taya, Sein Bo Tint, and U Tin. The town's main landmarks are the Laydaung Lake and the Tilaka Marazin Buddha Image, which is 9 cubits and 1 foot tall.
