= Free Funeral Service Society =

Free Funeral Service Society (Yangon)
- နာရေးကူညီမှုအသင်း
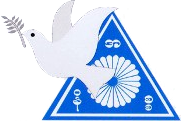
- Founded: 1 January 2001; 25 years ago
- Founder: Thukha
- Location: Yangon, Myanmar
- Region served: Yangon Region
- Key people: Kyaw Thu (Chief); Than Myint Aung (Vice Chief); Thukha (founder)
- Website: www.ffssyangon.org

The Free Funeral Service Society (Yangon) (Burmese: နာရေးကူညီမှုအသင်း, abbreviated FFSS), a civil society organisation based on Yangon, Myanmar, founded by Burmese film director Thukha, provides free funeral services to people from any religion, race and socioeconomic status at no cost in Yangon Region. It was founded on 1 January 2001 by film director Thukha and is headed by many prominent persons in the entertainment industry, including actor Kyaw Thu. FFSS has helped fund around 200,000 funerals since it first started.

In 2006, FFSS opened a free health care clinic called Thukha Clinic. In 2009, its free clinic was ordered by a local court to be closed, after being forcibly relocated from Thingangyun Township to North Dagon Township in Yangon's outlying suburbs. In September 2010, FFSS opened Thukha Ahara (သုခအဟာရ), a low cost restaurant in Yangon's North Dagon Township. In 2011, it opened another clinic in Bago Region's Pyay Township.

It applied for government registration in 2008 but has yet to be approved, as of November 2012.

FFSS has expanded its humanitarian services by operating free Ambulance and Fire Brigade services, providing humanitarian assistance to victims of war and natural disasters, opening Thukha Alin Charity Education centre which runs free vocational classes, computer, sports, arts, English and more classes.

On 8 January 2017, FFSS marked its 16th anniversary by opening a low-cost dialysis centre. Because of the cost of dialysis, FFSS will not be able to extend the services for free, but they will offer them at a much-reduced cost. "Thanks to our donors, we were able to buy new equipment and medicine for dialysis. But the course of treatment is very expensive, so we cannot offer services free of charge. A private clinic would charge K80,000, and we will offer the treatment for K25,000," said U Kyaw Thu.

As part of the response to the 1 February military coup, emergency response teams from the FFSS helped treat injured protesters in attacks by police and military. On the night of 3 March 2021, soldiers and police raided the office of the Free FFSS in Yangon's North Okkalapa Township on Wednesday night. They seized computers, phones, computers and documents from the office and destroyed the rest of the property on the premises. Staff were beaten and injured by the soldiers and police. U Kyaw Thu was not in the offices at the time and has gone into hiding.

== See also ==
- Brahmaso Humanitarian Aid Organisation
