= Nagani (song) =

Single by Khin Maung Yin
- Language: Burmese
- English title: Red Dragon
- Released: 1938
- Composer(s): Shwedaing Nyunt
- Producer(s): Nagani Book Club

"Nagani" (Burmese: နဂါးနီ, lit. 'Red Dragon') is a traditional Burmese song that became an anthem of British Burma's independence movement from Great Britain. Thu Maung's rendition of the song remains a classic in Myanmar today.

Nagani was produced by the Nagani Book Club in 1938, as a means to promote the nascent enterprise. Composed by Shwedaing Nyunt, it was first performed by Khin Maung Yin, a Burmese actor and singer. The song was an immediate hit due to its tune and lyrics, which invokes the "Burmese dream," including the right to self-determination, national pride, and a means out of poverty.
