= Dr. Aung Kyaw Oo =

1957 Burmese film

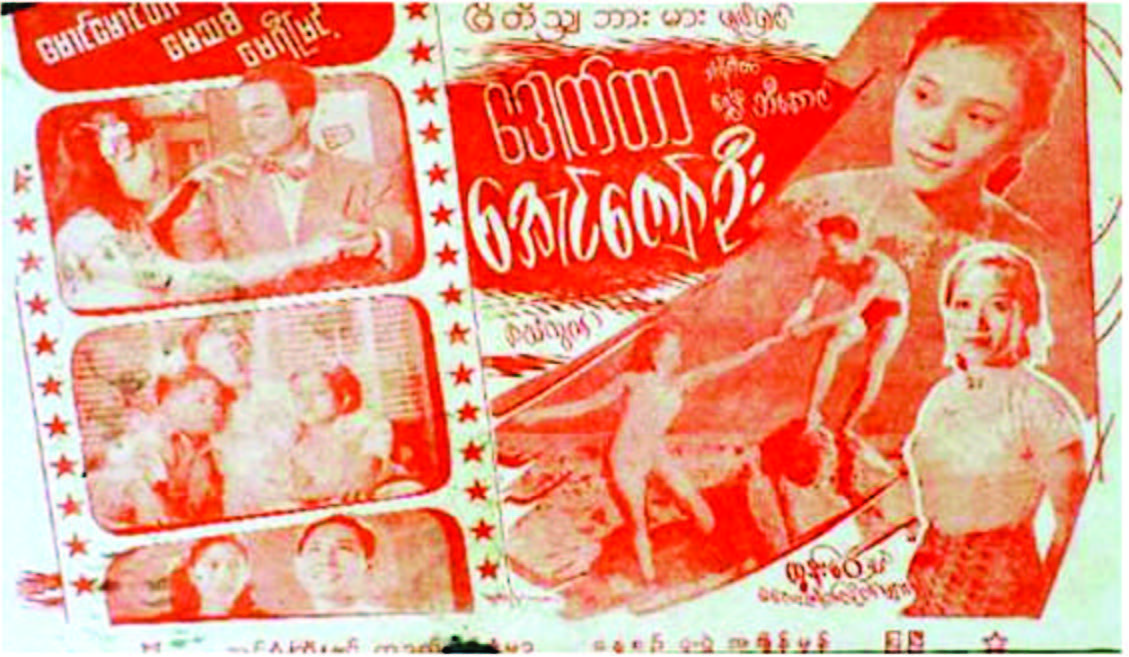
- poster art
- Burmese: ဒေါက်တာအောင်ကျော်ဦး
- Directed by: Shwe Done Bi Aung
- Starring: Maung Maung Ta; May Thit; Mary Myint
- Production company: British Burma Film
- Release date: May 10, 1957
- Running time: 160 minutes
- Country: Myanmar
- Language: Burmese

Dr. Aung Kyaw Oo (Burmese: ဒေါက်တာအောင်ကျော်ဦး) is a 1957 Burmese black-and-white drama film, directed by Shwe Done Bi Aung starring Maung Maung Ta, May Thit and Mary Myint. British Burma Film won the Best Picture Award and Shwe Done Bi Aung won the Best Director Award in 1957 Myanmar Motion Picture Academy Awards.

== Cast ==
- Maung Maung Ta as Dr. Aung Kyaw Oo
- May Thit as Khin
- Mary Myint as Mary Myint
- Htun Wai as Htun Wai
