= Boycotter =

1937 Burmese Film

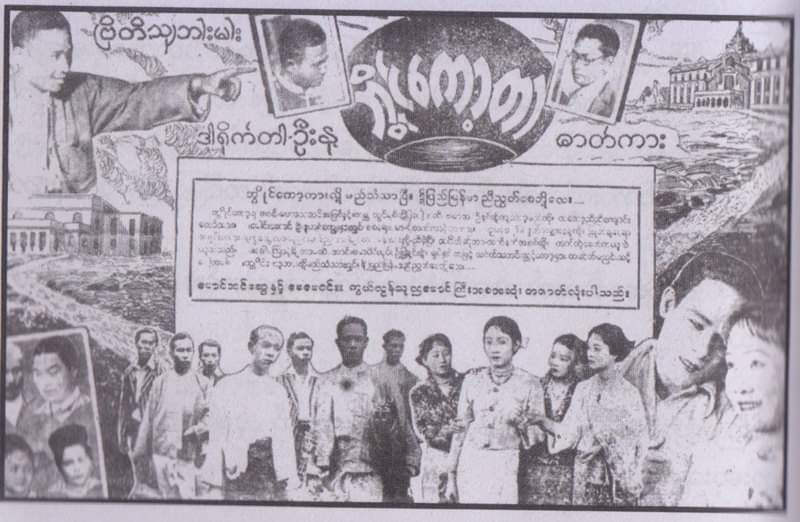
- Film poster
- Burmese: ဘွိုင်ကော့တာ
- Directed by: Ba Zin; U Nu
- Screenplay by: U Nu
- Starring: Aung San; U Nu; U Raschid; U Htun Ohn; Tin Swe; Hla Maung Gyi; May May Win
- Production company: British Burma Films
- Release date: September 18, 1937
- Running time: 117 minutes
- Country: Myanmar
- Language: Burmese

Boycotter (Burmese: ဘွိုင်ကော့တာ) is a 1937 Burmese black-and-white political-drama film, directed by Ba Zin and U Nu starring Aung San, U Nu, U Raschid, U Htun Ohn, Tin Swe, Hla Maung Gyi and May May Win.

== Cast ==
- Aung San
- U Nu
- U Raschid
- U Htun Ohn
- Tin Swe
- Hla Maung Gyi
- May May Win
