= Ka Gyi Yay Ka =

1959 Burmese Film

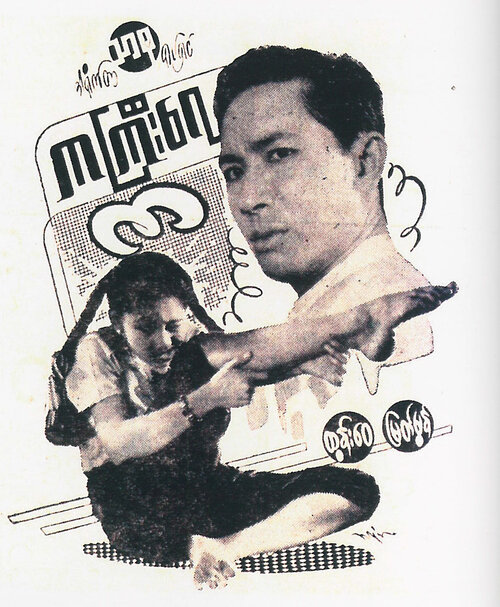
- Film poster
- Burmese: ကကြီးရေက
- Directed by: Tha Du
- Starring: Htun Wai; Myat Mon; Khin Nyunt
- Production company: Tha Du Films
- Release date: 1959
- Running time: 123 minutes
- Country: Myanmar
- Language: Burmese

Ka Gyi Yay Ka (Burmese: ကကြီးရေက) is a 1959 Burmese black-and-white drama film, directed by Tha Du starring Htun Wai, Myat Mon and Khin Nyunt.

== Cast ==
- Htun Wai
- Myat Mon
- Khin Nyunt

== Awards ==
Year	Award	Category	Nominee	Result
1959	Myanmar Motion Picture Academy Awards	Best Director	Tha Du	Won
1959	Myanmar Motion Picture Academy Awards	Best Actor	Htun Wai	Won
1959	Myanmar Motion Picture Academy Awards	Best Actress (tied)	Myat Mon	Won
1959	Myanmar Motion Picture Academy Awards	Best Actress (tied)	Khin Nyunt	Won
