= Son Bo Aung Din =

1955 Burmese Film

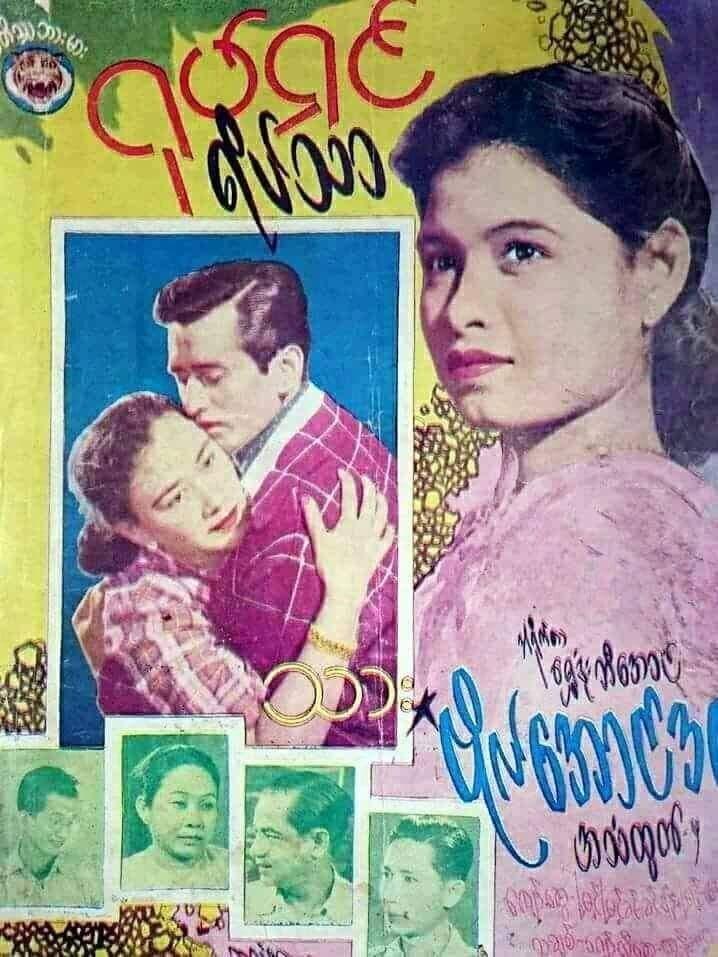
- Film poster
- Burmese: သားဗိုလ်အောင်ဒင်
- Directed by: Shwe Done Bi Aung
- Starring: Kyaw Swe; Myint Myint Khin; Khin Ohn Myint; Htun Wai; Ba Chit; May May Win; Jolly Swe
- Cinematography: U Htun Kyaing; U Ba Kyi
- Music by: Shwe Pyi Aye
- Production company: British Burma Films
- Release date: 1955
- Running time: 130 minutes
- Country: Myanmar
- Language: Burmese

Son Bo Aung Din (Burmese: သားဗိုလ်အောင်ဒင်) is a 1955 Burmese black-and-white drama film, directed by Shwe Done Bi Aung starring Kyaw Swe, Myint Myint Khin, Khin Ohn Myint, Htun Wai, Ba Chit and May May Win. The film is about Bo Aung Din's son "Bo Mya Din" and is a sequel to Bo Aung Din.

== Cast ==
- Kyaw Swe as Bo Mya Din
- Myint Myint Khin as A Mar
- Khin Ohn Myint as Kyar Khin Sein
- Htun Wai as Htun Wai
- Ba Chit as U Ba Chit
- May May Win as Ma Mya Win
- Jolly Swe as Jolly

== See also ==
- Bo Aung Din
