= Bawa Thanthayar =

1956 Burmese film

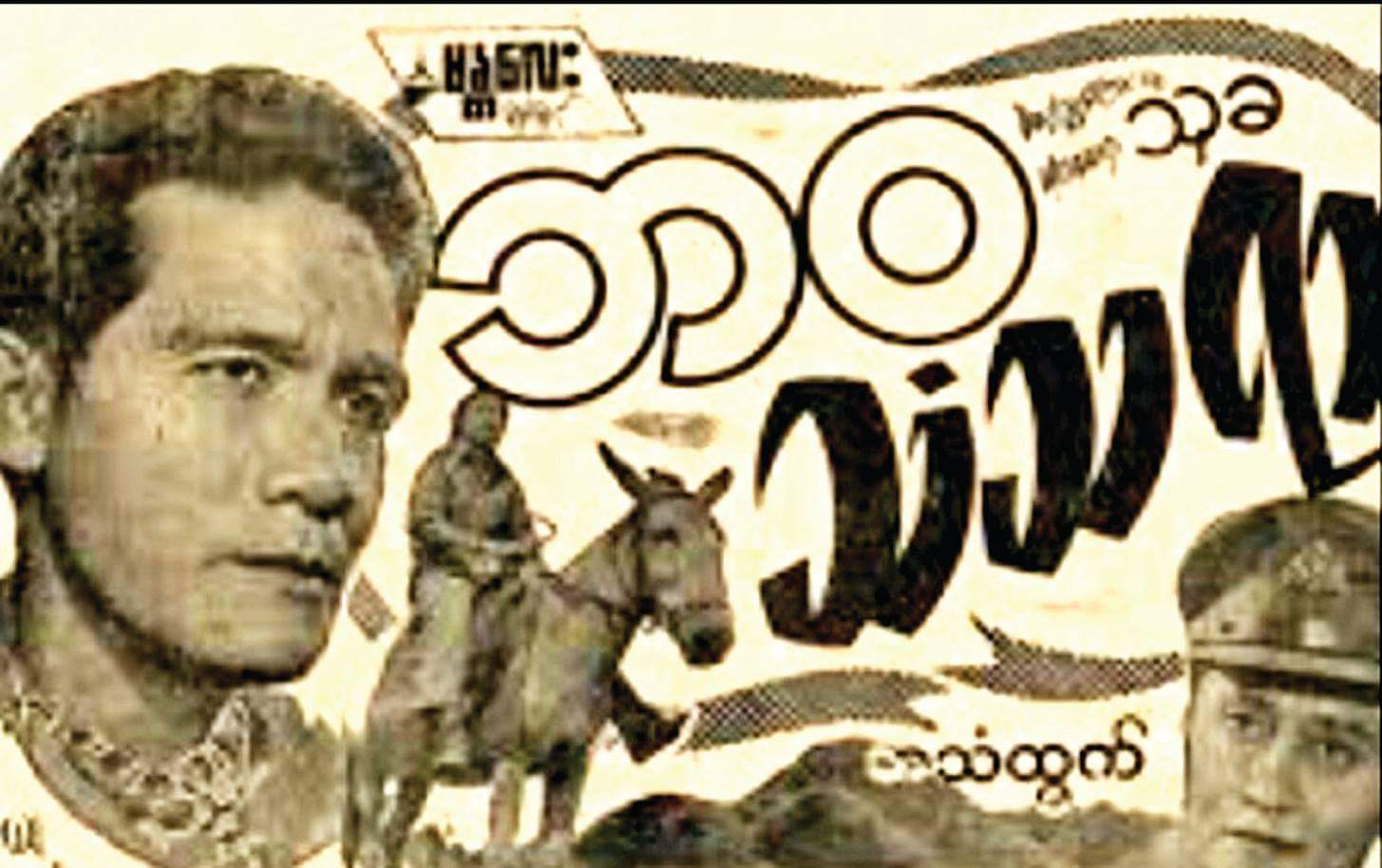
- poster art
- Burmese: ဘဝသံသရာ
- Directed by: Thukha
- Screenplay by: Thukha
- Starring: May Thit; Zeya; Thukha; Aye Kyu; Gyan Sein
- Music by: Thukha
- Production company: Mandalay Film
- Release date: December 14, 1956
- Running time: 120 minutes
- Country: Myanmar
- Language: Burmese
- Box office: Ks.5,02,567/- (Myanmar); £stg.3,000 (China)

Bawa Thanthayar (Pali: Bhava Samsara) (Burmese: ဘဝသံသရာ; lit. 'Cycle of Life') is a 1956 Burmese black-and-white drama film, directed by Thukha starring Zeya, May Thit, Thukha and Aye Kyu. It is one of the most famous films in the history of Burmese cinema and was only released at the end of the year, but was the highest grossing film of 1956.

== Making film ==
It was the debut film of Mandalay Film and was shot by Thukha in 1955 and took about a year.

== International released ==
On December 14, 1956, it broke the record for the highest grossing sound film in Rangoon cinemas. It earned Ks.5,02,567/-. It was premiered in China and earned £stg.3,000.

== Cast ==
- May Thit
- Zeya
- Thukha
- Aye Kyu
- Gyan Sein

== Awards ==
Year	Award	Category	Nominee	Result
1956	Myanmar Motion Picture Academy Awards	Best Picture	Mandalay Film	Won
1956	Myanmar Motion Picture Academy Awards	Best Director	Thukha	Won
1956	Myanmar Motion Picture Academy Awards	Best Actor	Zeya	Won

== Soundtrack ==
The song "Life Cycle", written and sung by Thukha and accompanied by U Ba Thein from Mandalay Film, is still popular today.
