= U Tin (musician) =

Burmese slide guitarist

Man Yar Pyae U Tin မန်းရာပြည့် ဦးတင်
- Born: 8 July 1931; Kyaiklat, British Burma
- Died: 5 February 2019 (aged 87); Yangon, Myanmar
- Genres: Mahāgīta; classical
- Occupation: Musician
- Instruments: Slide guitar; banjo; mandolin; saung
- Years active: 1947–2019
- Spouse: Cho Cho

Man Yar Pyae U Tin (Burmese: မန်းရာပြည့် ဦးတင်) was a traditional Burmese musician, best known for adapting the slide guitar to play folk and classical Burmese music.

== Early life ==
U Tin was born in Kyaiklat, British Burma on 8 July 1931 to farmers Ba Aye and Than Yi. He learned from Rangoon-based musicians who fled to Kyaiklat during World War II.

== Career ==
He moved to Rangoon in 1947, beginning a career as a plumber whilst studying music. U Tin's reputation as a slide guitarist grew, which enabled him to perform abroad in Japan, Thailand, Germany, the Philippines, and the United States. U Tin earned the honorific Man Yar Pyae (lit. 'Mandalay's centennial') in 1957, for his performance of Mahagita songs on the slide guitar at the 100th anniversary of Mandalay's establishment. In 1959, he began an eponymous band, performing frequently on Burma Broadcasting Service.

During his career, he won several national prizes. He continued working at Yangon City Development Committee until the age of 60 as a plumber. From 2003 until his death, he worked at Gitameit Music Institute.

In 2015, his performances were recorded in Music of Burma - Burmese Guitar - U Tin.

== Personal life ==
He was married to Cho Cho, and had three daughters (Win Win Toe, Win Win Nwe, and Myint Myint Nwe), and three sons.

== Death ==
He died on 5 February 2019 in Yangon, Myanmar, from diabetes complications.
