= Bo Aung Din =

1941 Burmese Film

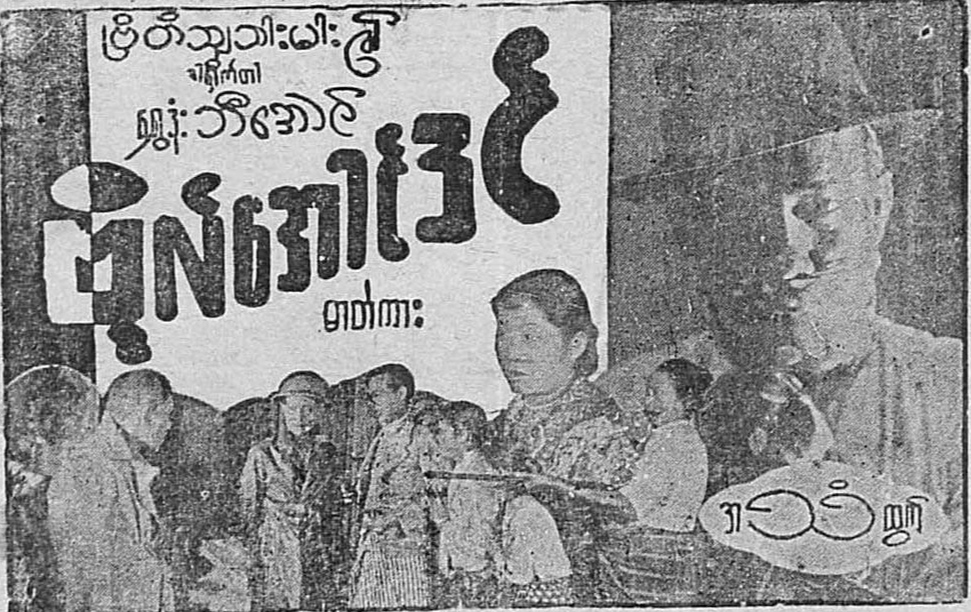
- Film Poster
- Burmese: ဗိုလ်အောင်ဒင်
- Directed by: Shwe Done Bi Aung
- Screenplay by: Shwe Done Bi Aung
- Starring: Khin Maung Yin; Ba Chit; May May Win
- Production company: British Burma Film Company
- Release date: March 25, 1941
- Running time: 174 minutes
- Country: Myanmar
- Language: Burmese

Bo Aung Din (Burmese: ဗိုလ်အောင်ဒင်) is a 1941 Burmese black-and-white drama film, directed by Shwe Done Bi Aung, starring Khin Maung Yin, Ba Chit and May May Win. The film, produced by British Burma Film Company, was one of the most popular films in the history of Burmese cinema.

== Cast ==
- Khin Maung Yin as Bo Aung Din
- Ba Chit as U Ba Chit
- May May Win as Ma Mya Win

== See also ==
- Son Bo Aung Din
