= The Milk Ogre =

2019 Burmese film

- Film Poster
- Burmese: နို့ဘီလူး
- Directed by: Lu Min
- Screenplay by: Nyein Min
- Based on: The Milk Ogre by Shwe Aye Ko
- Starring: Lu Min; Zay Ye Htet; Shwe Hmone Yati; Myat Mon
- Production company: Aung Thiri Film Production
- Release date: March 29, 2019 (Myanmar)
- Running time: 111 minutes
- Country: Myanmar
- Language: Burmese

The Milk Ogre (Burmese: နို့ဘီလူး) is a 2019 Burmese drama film, directed by Lu Min starring Lu Min, Zay Ye Htet, Shwe Hmone Yati and Myat Mon. The film, produced by Aung Thiri Film Production premiered in Myanmar on March 29, 2019.

== Plot ==
The story of the Milk Ogre curse is still accepted in some Burmese villages. The women living in that kind of village misbelieve that if a woman has a curse of milk ogre upon her, her baby will die by taking her breast milk. So, to avoid this tragedy, she denies to breastfeed her baby and rather sells the baby to someone else for adoption and then break the curse. The film was directed for the purpose of expressing this strange obsession.

== Cast ==
- Lu Min as The Milk Ogre
- Zay Ye Htet as Phoe La Min
- Shwe Hmone Yati as Byine Phyu
- Myat Mon as Daw Swal Mi

== Awards and nominations ==
Year	Award	Category	Nominee	Result
2020	Druk International Film Festival	Best Narrative Feature Outstanding Achievement Award	The Milk Ogre	Won
2020	Druk International Film Festival	Best Director Outstanding Achievement Award	Lu Min	Won
2020	Druk International Film Festival	Best Actor Outstanding Achievement Award	Lu Min	Won
2020	Druk International Film Festival	Best Supporting Actress Outstanding Achievement Award	Shwe Hmone Yati	Won
2020	Calcutta International Cult Film Festival	Best Narrative Feature Outstanding Achievement Award	The Milk Ogre	Won
2020	Calcutta International Cult Film Festival	Best Director	Lu Min	Won
2020	Calcutta International Cult Film Festival	Best Actor Outstanding Achievement Award	Lu Min	Won
2020	Calcutta International Cult Film Festival	Best Supporting Actress Outstanding Achievement Award	Shwe Hmone Yati	Won
2020	Calcutta International Cult Film Festival	Best Producer Award	Dr. Kyaw Kyaw Oo	Won
2020	Eurasia International Monthly Film Festival	Best Director	Lu Min	Won
