= Pho Thauk Kyar =

Burmese singer and actor

- ဖိုးသောကြာ
- Born: 5 February 1982 (age 44); Rangoon, Burma
- Occupations: Singer, actor
- Spouse: Hlaing Yadanar Hsu
- Parent(s): Thu Maung (father); Aye Aye May (mother)
- Musical career
- Genres: Burmese classical music
- Instrument: Vocals

Pho Thaukkyar (Burmese: ဖိုးသောကြာ; born Maung Thauk Kyar on 5 February 1982) is a Burmese singer and actor.

== Early life and career ==
Pho Thaukkyar, the second son of four siblings was born on 5 February 1982 to parents Thu Maung, film actor and his wife Aye Aye May. He began his career with film, Sein Che Phya Yaung Lin (စိန်ခြယ်ဖျာရောင်လင်း), starring alongside his father.

== Filmography ==
- Sein Che Phya Yaung Lin

== Discography ==
- Naga Ni (2018)

== Awards ==
- 2018 - Yangon City FM Award for Bestselling Traditional Burmese Album Producer
- 2018 - Yangon City FM Award for Bestselling Traditional Burmese Male Vocalist

== Personal life ==
He married Hlaing Yadanar Hsu on 16 March 2014.
