= Maung Wunna =

Burmese film director

- မောင် ဝဏ္ဏ
- Maung Wunna in 1991.
- Born: 19 January 1947; Rangoon, British Burma
- Died: 11 January 2011 (aged 63); Thingangyun Township, Yangon, Myanmar
- Occupations: Director, Writer
- Spouse: Cho Cho Yi
- Children: 1 daughter, 2 sons
- Relatives: Thu Maung, Min Lu (brother)
- Awards: Myanmar Academy Award (1971, 1990)

Maung Wunna (Burmese: မောင် ဝဏ္ဏ, 19 January 1947 – 11 January 2011) was a two-time Myanmar Motion Picture Academy Awards-winning Burmese director and writer. He came from a family heavily involved in the entertainment industry—his father Thadu was a director and his brother Thu Maung was a prominent singer and actor and Min Lu was a reputed satirist. Maung Wunna died of lung cancer in 2011.

== Career ==
Wunna worked from an early age as a sound engineer and film editor for his novelist and filmmaker father, Thadu. In 1970 he earned a BA in philosophy from University of Yangon. His first film as a director, Wearing Velvet Slippers under a Golden Umbrella, was released in 1971, and he won the National Award for Best Direction. Alongside his work as screenwriter and director, Maung Wunna published articles on film, short stories and novels.

After 42 years of regional release, his 1973 film Tender Are the Feet was premiered at the Forum section of the 64th Berlin Film Festival in February 2014.

== Filmography ==
- Wearing Velvet Slippers under a Golden Umbrella (Katipa phanat see shwe htee hsaung) (1971)
- Tender are the Feet (Ché phawa daw nu nu) (1973)
- Behind the Lace Curtain (Zar khan zee naut kwai hmer) (1973)
- Deep and Unforgettable Sorrow (Hnaung ta myaih myaih) (1975)
- The Palest of Pink (Pan nu yaung ma yint ta yint) (1976)
- Miss. Wai, Filled with Flowers (Pan tway nè wai) (1977)
- Self-less Ego (Atta ma San lo thaw Atta) (1978)
- I am Summer, My Lover is Winter (Kya-ma Ka Ngwe Ko ka Saung) (1978)
- To My Bosom Friend (Chit tè thu ngè lé) (1979)
- Across the Jungle (Sone Nathar Myaing) (1980)
- Wai Lwin Lwin (1981)
- Tree of Love (Achit Thit-pin) (1981)
- Is the Sky Going to Pour Down? (Pyo Hmar Lay lar Moe Ye) (1983)
- Let Compete our Love (Chit chin nge Pyaing Mal) (1986)
- Love with Heart and Life (Athe Athet Ne Atu) (1986)
- Maung Sein Thaung, Ma Hnin Yee (Maung Sein Thaung, Ma Hnin Yee) (1987)
- Seventh Degree Multiple Sorrow (Khun Hna Sin A Lwan) (1990)
- Miss Gyan Bone, from the Seven Hut District (Khwun na eain tan ka Ma Gyan Bone) (1994)
- Something to Laugh About (Yi saya maw sayar) (1996)
- Practical Experience (Atwe lay yae tae hma oh a-kyone) (1996)
- We are… (Kya-naw Kya-ma Toe Thi) (1998)
- Women and Money (Main-ma ne Ngwe) (1998)
- Winter in My Heart (Yin htè ka hsaung yarthi) (1999)
- Energy Boost (Dat khè) (2002)
- A Man who Can Laugh as Melancholy (Lwan aung yé tat thu) (2005)
- Right to the Core of the Heart (Yin nint aung hmwe) (2007)

== Awards ==
Myanmar Motion Picture Academy Awards

- 1971: Academy Award for Best Director, Katipa phanat see shwe htee hsaung (Wearing Velvet Slippers under a Golden Umbrella)
- 1990: Academy Award for Best Director, Khun hnit sint ah-lwan (Seventh Degree Multiple Sorrow)
