= Htun Wai =

Burmese actor, model and singer

- ထွန်းဝေ
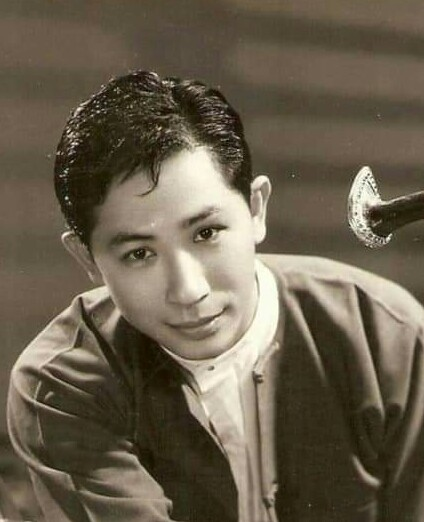
- Born: Htun Wai; October 23, 1920; Natalin, Bago Region, Myanmar
- Died: August 8, 2005 (aged 84)
- Occupation: Actor

Htun Wai (Burmese: ထွန်းဝေ, also spelt also Tun Wai; 23 October 1920 – 8 August 2005) is a three-time Myanmar Academy Award winning Burmese actor.

Htun won his first Myanmar Academy Award in 1957 with the film Bo Mya Din, achieved his second award in 1959 with the film Kagyi yae Ka and third award in 1983 with the film Tatiya arwale ei dutiya Waydanar .

== Early life and education ==
He was born on 23 October 1920 in Nattalin, Pegu Division, British Burma (now Bago Region, Myanmar), the eldest of his siblings. His father is Kyaw Sein and mother is Shwe Yin.

== Filmography ==
- Son Bo Aung Din (1955)
- Dr. Aung Kyaw Oo (1957)
- Bo Mya Din (1957)
- Ei Lu Baung Twin (1958)
- Ka Gyi Yay Ka (1959)
- Maung Mu Paing Shin (1964)
- First Class (1966)
- Hsaung (1966)
- Mahuyar (1976)
- Tatiya A Ywal Ei Dutiya Waydanar (1983)

== Awards and nominations ==
Year	Award	Category	Nominated work	Result
1957	Myanmar Academy Award	Best Actor	Bo Myadin	Won
1959	Myanmar Academy Award	Best Actor	Ka Gyi Yay Ka	Won
1983	Myanmar Academy Award	Best Supporting Actor	"Tatiy aarwale ei dutiya waydanar"	Won

== Personal life ==
Htun first married Daw Saw. After the death of his wife, Daw Saw, he remarried his wife's niece, Daw Htwe Htwe. They have two sons.

== Death ==
At Yankin Township, Yangon, Thiri Zeyar Road, he died at his home on August 8, 2005, at 1:25 am. He is survived by his wife, Daw Htwe Htwe, and children and his grandchildren.
