= Thaung Tun (filmmaker) =

Burmese editor, filmmaker, and poet

Thaung Tun (pen name Nyein Thit) is a Burmese editor, filmmaker, and poet. He was imprisoned from October 1999 to January 2007 after releasing videos that exposed the harsh conditions in his country. While in prison he received an International Press Freedom award.

== Life ==
Thaung Tun worked for the MV media group. He worked on the Rangoon city magazine Padaut Pwint Thit, while producing video reports for a privately owned production company. He was arrested in early October 1999 and sentenced to eight years in prison after releasing documentary videos about life in Burma that included scenes of the harsh conditions in rural areas. In an interview after his release he said "We were not jailed for taking video shots but because we had written articles and poems in some publications published by democratic forces whom the junta had declared outlawed groups. In those articles and poems, we called for the results of the 1990 election to be respected, and for a parliament to be formed according to the results of the 1990 elections".

While in prison, health care was poor and Thaung Tun suffered from forms of torture such as having to stand all night with his hands tied, or being forced to kneel on broken glass. Amnesty International named him a prisoner of conscience, and in 2004 he was given an International Press Freedom award by The Committee to Protect Journalists. After this award his conditions improved. Thaung Tun was released on 3 January 2007 along with 3,000 other prisoners in a new year's amnesty. His cameraman Aung Pwint, who had been arrested around the same time, had been released in July 2005.

After his release, Thaung Tun participated in antigovernment protests. He went into hiding to avoid re-arrest, but on 25 September 2007 his wife, Khin Mar Lar, was arrested in her family home in Mandalay. Their three children were left without support.
