= Min Lu =

Burmese writer (1954–2013)

- Born: Nyan Paw; 18 May 1954; Yangon, Burma
- Died: 14 August 2013 (aged 59); Yangon, Burma
- Education: Yangon University
- Spouse: San San Aung
- Children: Thu Ma, Yu Ya

Min Lu (Burmese: မင်းလူ; 18 May 1954 – 14 August 2013) was a Burmese writer. His real name was Nyan Paw (ဉာဏ်ပေါ်). He was born in Yangon in 1954, the fourth and youngest son of Thadu, a film director and writer, and Khin Nyo, a school headmistress. His brothers, Thu Maung and Maung Wunna, were also well known writers.

He studied philosophy at Yangon University from 1972 to 1977. His first novelette, Pan Kyaung (Flower School), was published in 1977. He went on to publish nearly 50 books in his career. He became a screenwriter in 1992. Several of his books were converted into movies and he wrote scripts for most of them.

He was arrested twice for his involvement in popular movements against government. He was arrested the first time for participating in the U Thant incident in 1974. He was sentenced for seven years but released after seven months because he was a student at that time. He was again sentenced for seven year in 1989 for his poem, Bartway Phyit Kone Kya Pi Lae (ဘာတွေ ဖြစ်ကုန် ကြပြီလည်း) but was released after three years. Over one thousand people were arrested by then military government for publishing and distributing the poem.

Lu had a wife, San San Aung, a university librarian, with whom he had two daughters. He died of lung cancer in Yangon on 14 August 2013.
