= May Nwet =

Burmese actress and singer (1914–2008)

May Nwet မေနွဲ့
- Born: Madi; 14 February 1914; British Burma
- Died: 20 January 2008 (aged 93); Yangon, Myanmar
- Occupation: Actress
- Spouse: Kyi Maung
- Awards: Best supporting actress (1962, 1975)

May Nwet was a Burmese actress and singer. She won the first Best Supporting Actress Award in the history of Burmese film industry. She starred in numerous films and videos from World War II to the video era.

== Early life and careers ==
May Nwae was born on February 13, 1919, to U Pe Hla and Daw Thein Shin. She was the youngest of five siblings. He studied up to the seventh grade and studied music with Sayar Nyein Gyi, Shwe Pyi Aye, Khin Myint Gyi and Saw Mya Aye Kyi. She also learned traditional Burmese dance from Lakshna U Kyaw, Sein Op and Thein Op. She has been performing in Myanmar Drama Event since she was 9 years old. She later appeared as a Burmese dance actress as "Hinthar Sein".

In 1936, she made her film debut with actor Ba Tint at the age of 17, starring in "Ye Bet Taw" and entered the film industry. After fleeing the war in World War II, she co-founded Aung Mingalar Drama troupe with a play led by Dagon Tin and performed throughout Upper Burma. She also co-played in Drama troupes such as Aung Lan Taw Khin Sein, U Phoe Sein Gyi, U Sein Aung Min and Bo K Than Sein. In 1938, she sang the songs of the period and formed the San Thida Band. She also sang in dramas and movie soundtracks. In 1949, she re-entered the film industry with the film Yan Pyae Man Pyae, directed by Shwe Don Be Aung, and made several films as the lead actress. She won the Best Supporting Actress award for her films Shwe Yin Thein Thit in 1962 and Shwe Chi Ngwe Chi Tan Bar Loh (Gold and Silver Ribbons) in 1975.

== Awards and nominations ==
Year	Award	Category	Nominated work	Result
1962	Myanmar Academy Award	Best Supporting Actress	Shwe Yin Thein Thit	Won
1975	Myanmar Academy Award	Best Supporting Actress	Shwe-Chi Ngwe-Chi Tan-Bar-Loh (Gold and Silver Ribbons)	Won

== Personal life ==
May married to U Kyi Maung. They have two daughters and three sons.

== Death ==
She died in Yangon on January 20, 2008, at the age of 89.
