= Sein Bo Tint =

Burmese 'hsaing waing' musician

Sein Bo Tint စိန်ဗိုလ်တင့်
- Born: 1938; Kyaiklat, British Burma
- Died: 23 August 1994 (aged 55–56) Yangon, Myanmar
- Occupation: Musician
- Instrument: Hsaing waing
- Spouse: San Pwint

Sein Bo Tint (Burmese: စိန်ဗိုလ်တင့်) was a renowned Burmese hsaing waing musician, best known for his virtuosity in playing the pat waing, a Burmese drum circle, his compositions, and the introduction of innovations in traditional Burmese music. He was a favourite musician of Ne Win.

== Early life ==
He was born Maung Tint in 1938, in Kyaiklat, British Burma, as the fifth of ten children. His father, Bo Kay Ohn, was a pat waing musician. He also learned to play the pattala, mandolin, flute, and hne as a child. During his childhood, he garnered the attention of Aung San, earning the honorific "Bo."

== Career ==
After leaving school at the age of 14, Tint became a full-time musician, whose performances were broadcast nationwide. He later earned the honorific "Sein" (lit. 'diamond') after he was elevated as a master musician. During his career, he introduced innovations to traditional Burmese music. He enlarged the hsaing waing ensemble, and created a new standard design for the ensemble, positioned within an intricately carved frame. He also expanded the kyi waing to 29 gongs, to accommodate the gap between Burmese and western tonalities.

== Death ==
He died from lung cancer on 23 August 1994 at Yangon General Hospital, survived by his wife San Pwint and seven children.

== Legacy ==
A bronze bust of Sein Bo Tint was completed in 2017 and placed in his hometown of Kyaiklat on 29 September.

On 17 April 2022, he was posthumously granted the Alinkar Kyawswa title.
