= Thu Maung =

- သုမောင်
- Born: Bala; 13 March 1951; Rangoon, Burma
- Died: 16 May 2010 (aged 59); Yangon, Myanmar
- Other name: Nyo Aung
- Occupations: Actor; writer; singer
- Spouse: Aye Aye May
- Children: Soe Ein Thu, Pho Thaukkya, Htein Htein Thar, Htate Htar
- Relatives: Wunna, Min Lu (brothers)
- Awards: 1 Academy Award

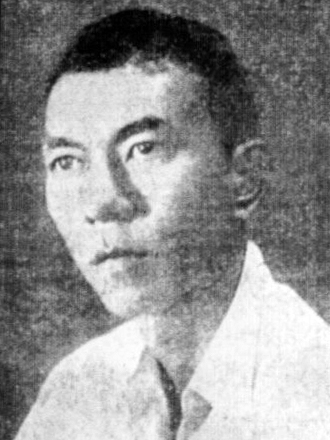
Thu Maung's father, U Thadu.

Thu Maung (Burmese: သုမောင် [θṵ màʊɰ̃]; 13 March 1951 – 16 May 2010; born Bala) was a Myanmar Academy Award-winning film actor, singer as well as a distinguished writer and director. Throughout his film career, Thu Maung acted in over 40 films. He was born in Rangoon, Burma to parents U Thadu, a well-known author and director, and Daw Khin Nyo. Thu Maung was educated at St. Paul's High School. In 1966, he was admitted into the Government Technical High School, where he subsequently obtained a diploma in diesel engineering in 1969. During this period, he began writing poems and short stories for the Yuwadi Journal (ယုဝတီ ဂျာနယ်). In 1970, he published his first short story, Thanakha Yay Kye Kye (သနပ်ခါးရေကျဲကျဲ) under the pen name Oke Soe in the Wut Hmone Journal.

Thu Maung made his acting debut in the 1974 film Chit San Na Mu (ချစ်စံနမူ), becoming a popular screen actor throughout the 1970s. In 1990, he was awarded with the Myanmar Academy Award for his performance in the movie Khun Hna Sin A Lwan (ခုနှစ်စဉ်အလွမ်း). Thu Maung began his song career in 1974, writing Pan U Pan Me for the film Naung Ta Myay Myay (နှောင်းတမြေ့မြေ့၊), and wrote over 2,00 songs throughout the course of his career.

He participated Iowa International Writing Program together with Khin Lay Nyo in 2001.

Thu Maung died in Yangon on 16 May 2010 at the Thukha Gaba private clinic of liver disease. His son Pho Thaukkya is also a film actor and singer.

His brother, Min Lu, also a reputed writer, died in Yangon in 2013.

== Selected works ==
- Achit (Love) (1974, reprinted 1977 & 1996)
- Theik Chit The Ma Hote Larr (Love very much?) (1976)
- Shin Nay Min Hma Pay Taw Sar (Letter from the Sun) (translation) (1976)
- Pin Tai San Seik Ma Kaung Par Bu Kwe (1977)
- Achit Pwint Kalay Myar (Small love flowers) (1978)
- Achit Thit Pin (Love tree) (1978)
- Sar Myat Nar 16 (Page 16) (1978)
- Achit Ngar Ma Thi (Love I don't know) (1978)
- Thardu and sons (1978)
- Achit 2 (Love 2) (1979)
- Achit Set (1979)
- Achit Ye Nauk Sone Yet Myar (The last days of love) (1979)
- Thu Maung Hmar Thu Maung Hmar (Her brother her brother) (1979)
- Achit Ne Thu Ye Ko Ko (1979)
- Ngar Kwa, Khu Se Yar Htaung Taung Thein Than Kathe (1980)
- Thit Tee Too (Lapwing) (1980)
- Chit Chit Chit 1 2 3 (Love love love 1 2 3) (1980)
- Academy (1980)
- Hto Kyaung Achit Hu Khor Te (So it is love) (1981)
- Sabie Thone Kone (3 rings of jasmine) (1981)
- La (Moon) (1981)
- Pan Swe Dor Ywet Kalay (Small leave of Swe Dor) (1982)
- Da Yin Kaut and other short stories (1983)
- Thar Du and about our fathers (1984)
- Sending a short story (1985)
- Ma Chit Tat Tar Ma Hote Par Ma Chit Chin Tar Par (1985)
- Achit Larr Thu Phyar Nay De (Love? She has a fever) (1986)
- Kabargyi Tont Twar De (The world was shaken) (1987)
- Nget Kaly Twe Maung Gaung Paw Hmar Min Gaung Paw Hmar (Small birds on my head on your head) (1988)
- Hmat Hmat Ya Ya Shu Ma Wa Wut Htu Tot Myar (1999)
- Kwun Sakarr (Talk on betel) (1999, reprinted in 2004)
- Aye Bone Ka Pyaw Par The (Talked by Aye Bone) (1999)
- Pan Ywun ein (Lacquer flower house) (2000)
- Nan Net Sar (Breakfast) (2001)
- Tri (2001)
- Ayet Tamarr Amarr Tit Khar (2002)
- Thet Gyi Ywe O (Elder) (2002)
- 20th century Myanmar comic short stories (2003)
