= Aung Pwint =

Burmese journalist

- အောင်ပွင့်
- Born: c. 1950
- Occupation: Journalist
- Organization: People's Peaceful Demonstration Committee
- Known for: 1999 imprisonment
- Awards: CPJ International Press Freedom Award (2004)

Aung Pwint (Burmese: အောင်ပွင့်, pronounced [ʔàʊɰ̃ pwɪ̰ɰ̃]; born c. 1950; also known by his pen name of Maung Aung Pwint) is a Burmese journalist and documentary maker notable for his 1999 imprisonment by the State Peace and Development Council (SPDC), Burma's military government, on charges of fax-machine ownership and "sending news".

== Documentary work ==
Aung Pwint was first arrested by authorities in 1967 and detained for a year; Human Rights Watch attributes this arrest to his "contacts with the rebellious student movement". In 1978, he was arrested again and held this time for seventeen months.

During 1988's widespread pro-democracy protests against the rule of General Ne Win, Aung Pwint acted as joint secretary for the People's Peaceful Demonstration Committee of the Delta region. Following the repression of the protests, he joined a media group to produce videos and calendars documenting the lives of Burma's ordinary people. These documentaries were banned by the SPDC (then known as SLORC, the State Law and Order Restoration Council) in 1996 "because they were considered to show too negative a picture of Burmese society and living standards".

Aung Pwint continued to film, however. Even as he earned a living making videos for tourist agencies and educational companies, he also produced further documentaries on topics such as poverty and forced labour. These videos were then circulated inside and outside Burma via clandestine networks. During this time, he began to work with fellow poet and filmmaker Thaung Tun, better known by his pen name of Nyein Thit. Aung Pwint was born on 11 November 1945 in Payagone village, Thabaung Township, Bassein District, Irrawaddy Delta.

== 1999 arrest and imprisonment ==
On 4 November 1999, Aung Pwint and Nyein Thit were arrested. The official charges against Aung Pwint were "illegal possession of a fax machine" and "sending news" to banned newspapers. The two men were tried together and given eight-year prison sentences; Aung Pwint served his at Tharawaddy Prison.

As a result of Aung Pwint's confinement, his family was reportedly severely impoverished. Amnesty International also reported that he suffered from a gastric ulcer in prison and that his health was at risk. Following what The Irrawaddy described as an "intensive international campaign" for his freedom, he was released as part of a "special amnesty" for journalists in July 2005, so unexpectedly that he had to call his family on the way home from the prison to report that he had been freed. Nyein Thit remained imprisoned until 4 January 2007, serving nearly his full eight-year sentence, despite allegedly suffering a "brain ailment" as a result of his confinement.

== International attention ==
Amnesty International protested Aung Pwint's arrest and called for his release, the former naming him a prisoner of conscience. In 2001, Human Rights Watch named him the recipient of a Hellman/Hammett Grant for writers "in recognition of the courage with which [he] faced political persecution".

In 2004, Aung Pwint and Nyein Thit won the International Press Freedom Award of the US-based Committee to Protect Journalists. An editorial in The Washington Post published following the awards described the pair as "heroes of press freedom".
