= Nagani Book Club =

Burmese publisher from 1937 to 1941

- Status: Ceased publication in 1941
- Founded: November 4, 1937
- Founder: U Nu; Tun Aye
- Country of origin: British Burma
- Headquarters location: Scott Market, Rangoon
- Publication types: Books; newsletters

The Nagani Book Club (Burmese: နဂါးနီစာအုပ်အသင်း) was a publishing group in British Burma. Modelled after the Left Book Club in London, it exerted a strong left-wing influence in the British colony. From 1937 to 1941, the club issued 70 to 100 Burmese language books in the fields of literature, history, economics, politics, and science, and published a monthly newsletter. The book club ceased publication in 1941, due to the outbreak of World War II and ensuing suppression of operations during the Japanese occupation of Burma. The book club was popularised by the eponymous song, Nagani (lit. 'Red Dragon'). Closely associated with the Thakin movement, the book club familiarised local readers with international developments, knowledge, and literature, and influenced the country's independence movement from Great Britain.
