= Shwe Done Bi Aung =

Burmese film director, writer and script-writer

- ရွှေဒုံးဘီအောင်
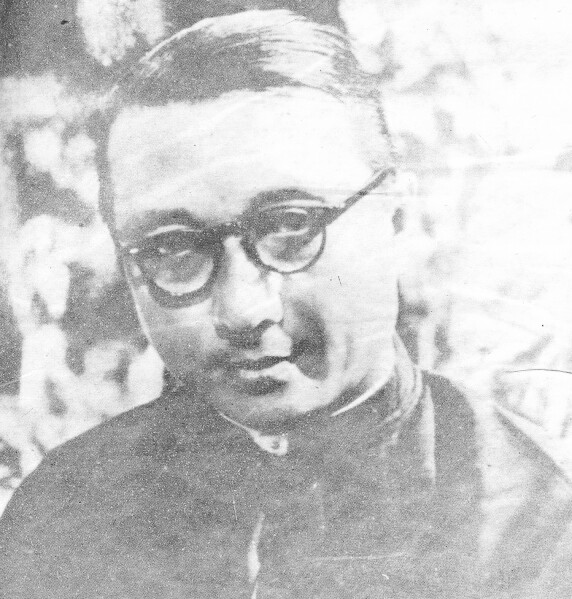
- Born: Nay Myo Kyaw Thu Aung; 17 February 1906; Nyaungdon, Irrawaddy Division, British Burma
- Died: 11 March 1986 (aged 80); Rangoon, Burma
- Occupations: Film Director; writer; script-writer; composer
- Years active: 1932–1986
- Notable work: Bo Aung Din; Dr. Aung Kyaw Oo
- Parent(s): U Po Shwe Hla (father); Daw Hla Kay Thi (mother)
- Awards: Myanmar Motion Picture Academy Awards (Best Director Award for 1957)

Shwe Done Bi Aung (Burmese: ရွှေဒုံးဘီအောင်; born Nay Myo Kyaw Thu Aung 17 February 1906 – 11 March 1986) was a Burmese film director, writer, script-writer and composer. He is best known for directing in film Bo Aung Din (1941).

== Biography ==
Shwe Done Bi Aung was born on 17 February 1906, to parents U Po Shwe Hla and Daw Hla Kay Thi in Nyaungdon, Irrawaddy Division, British Burma. He was eldest of two siblings. He went to Nyaungdon high School. In 1927, he passed the tenth grade. In 1932, while he was working as a clerk in the municipal office, he began wrote Kanhtoo novel for Dagon Magazine. As a student, he wrote the English poem Dying Ahzarni, referring to Bo Aung Kyaw, and won a gold medal in the competition.

After that, he was contacted by Dagon Magazine and moved to Rangoon from Nyaungdon. And he wrote novels under the name Shwe Done Bi Aung such as Yay Nat Daewei Padamani (ရေနတ်ဒေဝီပဒမဏိ), Pyi Gyi Myat Shin (ပြည်ကြီးမျက်ရှင်), Tar Thi Yawpiya ( တာသိယောပီယ) and Lay Taw Shin (လေးတော်ရှင်). He was the assistant editor of Dagon Hla Phay, the editor of Dagon Magazine. Then he wrote novels Guerrillas 9 (ပြောက်ကျား၉), The return of Bo Aung Din (ဗိုလ်အောင်ဒင်ပြန်လာပြီ) and Soe Par Nae May (ဆိုးပါနဲ့မေ).

In 1934–35, he opened his own library, Burma Tara, and published a novel called Three Colors. He then worked as a script-writer in the British Burma film (Nyunt Myanmar Film). He wrote scripts for the silent films such as Thu Pone Thway (သူပုန့်သွေး), Yee Yee Kutho (ရီရီ ကုသိုလ်), Shwe Phone Thaw (ရွှေဘုန်းတော်) and for the sound films such as Virgin (အပျိုစင်), Beloved Thuzar (အချစ်ဆုံးသူဇာ), Devi Love and Glory (ဒေဝီမေတ္တာနှင့်ဂုဏ်).

In 1940–41, he began directed Bo Aung Din (ဗိုလ်အောင်ဒင်), a sound film starring Khin Maung Yin, Ba Chit and May May Win produced by British Burma Film, which became a hit and left in the history of Burmese cinema.

During the Japanese era, a real soldier play (တကယ့်စစ်သား ပြဇာတ်) was performed at Kandawgyi Myaing Theater and at the end of the war, a variety of plays were performed at the Kar Htay Theater in Western Rangoon. Then, in the post-war era, he has made silent films such as Mahabandula (မဟာဗန္ဓုလ) (film was not completed), Khun Na Sin Kyal (ခုနှစ်စဉ်ကြယ်) and The Storm of Greed (လောဘမုန်တိုင်း). After 1948, he has made films with sound such as Pwal Khar Nyaung Yay (ပွဲခါညောင်ရေ), Dr. Aung Kyaw Oo (ဒေါက်တာအောင်ကျော်ဦး), Son Bo Aung Din (သားဗိုလ်အောင်ဒင်), In this world (ဤလူ့ဘောင်တွင်), Rubies (ပတ္တမြားမယ်), The Gift of Life (ဘဝလက်ဆောင်), Experience (အတွေ့), Maunt Karunar (မောင့်ကရုဏာ) by Ko Paing Shwe Eudaung Film (ကိုယ်ပိုင်ရွှေဥဒေါင်း ရုပ်ရှင်), Brown Cloud (တိမ်ညို) and Sandar (စန္ဒာ).

Among the films directed by Shwe Done Bi Aung, Kyaw Win won Best Actor Award by Mar Lar Ri (မာလာရီ) Film, May Myint won Best Actress Award by Pwal Khar Nyaung Yay Film, Thi Thi won Best Actress Award by Experience Film. Then he won Best Director Award by Dr. Aung Kyaw Oo Film and the film also won Best Picture Award in 1957 Myanmar Motion Picture Awards.

In 1962, under the Revolutionary Council government, he was the first chairman of the Myanmar Film Council. In 1968, he published a film education book named Film Science Fiction (ရုပ်ရှင်ပညာ အမြုတေ). Since 1980, he served as chairman of the Basic Workers' Union of Tamwe Township.

== Death ==
Shwe Done Bi Aung died on 11 March 1986 in Rangoon. At the time of his death, left his wife, Daw Yin May, Daw Tin Shwe and one son.

== Filmography ==
- Bo Aung Din (1941)
- Son Bo Aung Din (1955)
- Dr. Aung Kyaw Oo (1957)
- Ei Lu Baung Twin (1958)
- A Tway (1962)
