= Zeya (Burmese actor) =

- ဇေယျ
- Born: Hla Maung; 12 June 1916; Sagaing Province, British Burma
- Died: 7 October 1996 (aged 80)
- Years active: 1946 – 1985
- Spouse: Than Tin
- Parent(s): U Maung, Daw Sin
- Awards: Burmese Academy Award; Bawa Thanthaya (1956)

Zeya (Burmese: ဇေယျ [zèja̰]; 12 June 1916 – 7 October 1996) was a Burmese Academy Award winning film actor and director. He was also a body builder.

== Biography ==
Zeya was born Hla Maung [l̥a̰ màʊɴ] in Nyaunggon village in Upper Burma during the British colonial rule. The 8th of 10 siblings, Zeya left school only third grade to help out with his parents' plantation. He married Than Tin, the daughter of a Mandalay jewellery merchant. They would have nine children.

Zeya became a professional body builder. At age 27, Zeya won the Zeyar Maung (Mr. Zeyar) title in 1943 given by Sagaing Body Building Association. In 1946, he won Shwe Man Maung (Mr. Golden Mandalay).

Zeya made his film debut in 1946. In 1956, he won the Burmese Academy Award in Bawa Thanthaya (Life's Samsara). He founded Zeyar Shwe Pyi Film Company and directed several films.

== Filmography ==
- Ma Chit Le Poun Chit Le Poun
- The Saung Hayman
- Oh Meinma
- Bawa Thanthayar
- Pha Ta Lone Gaung Kyar
- Chit Khwint Ma Paing
