= Thukha =

Burmese film director (1910–2005)

- သုခ
- Born: Thein Maung; 14 January 1910; Sarphyuzu village, Kyaiklat Township, Ayeyawady Division
- Died: 7 December 2005 (aged 95); Yangon, Yangon Division, Myanmar
- Years active: 1938 – 2005
- Notable work: Bawa Thanthayar
- Parent(s): San Khaing; Daw Myin
- Awards: Alinkar Kyawswar

Thukha (Burmese: သုခ, pronounced [θṵkʰa̰]; 14 January 1910 – 7 December 2005) was a six-time Burmese Academy Award winning film director, writer, song writer, script writer, film actor and film producer. His film production company, Thukha Films Company, won Best Picture Award for twice. Thukha directed 33 films and is considered the most successful Burmese film director.

== Biography ==
Born Thein Maung in the Irrawaddy delta in British Burma, Thukha began writing poems as a middle school student. He became familiar with classical Burmese music at an early age thanks to his grandfather, a harpist. Thukha studied at Kyaiklat and Pyapon National Schools.

Thukha began his writing career at age 19 with a short fiction work "Zabe Pwint" ("Jasmine Petal") in Kawi Myetmhan magazine under the pen name Sein Thein Dan. He began using the pen name Thukha – meaning "pleasure" when he began writing fiction for Shwin-Pyaw-Pyaw magazine. Of his novels, Gon-Ye-Matu-Lo-La (Am I Not an Equal for You?) and Di-Saung-Hayman (This Winter) were the most successful. He also wrote many books on Buddhism, including Loka Niti, Mangala Sutta, Metta Sutta and Dhamma Rasa. Thukha wrote more than 100 novels and 200 short stories.

Thukha started his film career in 1938. His script for Chitthamya (As Much As I Love) brought widespread fame and won respect and acknowledgment from the filmmaking community. The Myanmar Writers’ Association awarded him an honorary prize for his first directing project. Out of the 33 films he made over the course of his career, six of them won the Myanmar Motion Picture Organization's best director award.

Thukha was also a talented songwriter. "Bawa Thanthaya" (Pali: Bhava "Samsara"; "Life, Samsara or The life in Samsara") and "Gon" ("Status") were among his most popular songs. "Bawa Thanthaya" compares people to travelers on a train getting on and off at every station, illustrating the cycle of death and rebirth. "Gon" poked fun at people’s devotion to money and status.

Thukha was a devout Buddhist and included Buddhist morals and concepts in all his films and novels. He directed three documentaries related to Buddhism for Burmese television.

Although he received success and recognition for both his writing and directing work, Thukha's first priority was always writing. His former pupil and close colleague, director Maung Hnin Moe, said: "He preferred writing to other jobs. He always put the title Writer and Director before his name." "Because he could not read or write in his old age," Maung Hnin Moe said, "he was thinking all the time and it is a great loss that he could not transform his thoughts into a form of work such as a book or film."

Thukha was profoundly respected for his altruistic attitude and works. He was the founder and president of the Free Funeral Service Society, which volunteers its funeral services to any family regardless of race, religion or social standing. He was also known for his efforts to rename the full moon day of Pyatho (which normally falls in January) as Mothers' Day, as well as for his campaign for younger generations to pay more respect to their mothers.

On October 26, 2000, Yangon University conferred the Doctor of Letters (Honoris Causa) degree on U Thukha for his significant and outstanding contributions and abilities.

== Partial filmography ==
- Chitthamya (As Much As I Love) (1938)
- Chit Anumyu (Love Atom) (1948)
- Aw Meinma (Oh Woman) (1954)
- Bawa Thanthayar (Life's Samsara) (1956)
- Zagar Pyaw Thaw Athe Hnalone (Talking Heart) (1968)
- Kyun Ma Mhar Main Ma Thar (I'm the Girl) (1970)
- Aww Main Ma Main Ma (1972)
- Bal Thu Pyaing Lo Hla Par Taw Naing (Who Can Be More Beautiful?) (1973)
- Shwe-Chi Ngwe-Chi Tan-Ba-Lo (Gold and Silver Ribbons) (1975)
- Ta Oo Ka Saytanar Ta Oo Ka Myittar (1976)
- Chit A Mhya (1979)
- A Kar Ka A Chit A Hnit Ka Myittar (1979)
