= List of films: H =

indexed lists of films
0–9	A	B	C	D	E	F
G	H	I	J–K	L	M	N–O
P	Q–R	S	T	U–V–W	X–Y–Z	

This is an alphabetical list of film articles (or sections within articles about films). It includes made for television films. See the talk page for the method of indexing used.

== H ==
- H: (1990 & 2002)
- H. (2014)
- H. G. Wells' The Shape of Things to Come (1979)
- H. G. Wells' War of the Worlds (The Asylum) (2005)
- H. G. Wells' The War of the Worlds (Pendragon Pictures) (2005)
- H. M. Pulham, Esq. (1941)
- H.M.S. Defiant (1962)
- The H-Man (1958)
- H.O.T.S. (1979)
- H.P. Lovecraft's Witch House (2021)
- H_{2}O: (1929 & 2004)
- H2S (1969)
- H3 (2001)
- H4 (2012)
- H4Z4RD (2022)
- H6: Diary of a Serial Killer (2006)
- H-8 (1958)
- H8RZ (2015)

=== Ha ===
- Ha-Chan, Shake Your Booty! (2026)
- Ha da venì... don Calogero! (1952)
- Ha fatto tredici (1951)
- Ha! Ha! Ha! (1934)
- Ha'penny Breeze (1950)

==== Haa–Hab ====
- Haal E Kangaal (2014)
- Haalu Jenu (1982)
- Haalu Thuppa (2017)
- Haami (2018)
- Haami 2 (2022)
- Haan (2005)
- Haan Maine Bhi Pyaar Kiya (2002)
- Haani (2013)
- Haar Jeet (1940)
- Haar Jeet (1972)
- Haasil (2003)
- Haata Dhari Chaaluthaa (2013)
- Haatchhani (2012)
- Haath Ki Safai (1974)
- Haathi Ke Daant (1973)
- Haathi Mere Saathi (1971)
- Haathi Mere Saathi (1993)
- Haathkadi (1982)
- Haathkadi (1995)
- Haathon Ki Lakeeren (1986)
- Haatim Tai (1990)
- Hababam Sınıfı (1975)
- Hababam Sınıfı Sınıfta Kaldı (1975)
- Hababam Sınıfı Tatilde (1977)
- Habana Blues (2005)
- Habana Eva (2010)
- Habanastation (2011)
- Habba (1999)
- Habeas Corpus (1928)
- Haber (2008)
- Habermann (2010)
- Había una vez un circo (1972)
- Habibie & Ainun (2012)
- Habit (1921)
- Habit (1997)
- Habit (2021)
- The Habit of Happiness (1916)
- Habitat (1997)
- Habla, mudita (1973)
- Habu Chandra Raja Gobu Chandra Montri (2021)

==== Hac–Hak ====
- Hachi: A Dog's Tale (2009)
- Hachiko Monogatari (1987)
- Hack! (2007)
- Hacked (2020)
- Hackers (1995)
- Hacks: (1997 & 2002)
- Hacksaw (2020)
- Hacksaw Ridge (2016)
- Haddina Kannu (1980)
- Hades (1995)
- Hadewijch (2009)
- Hadh: Life on the Edge of Death (2001)
- Hadh Kar Di Aapne (2000)
- Hadinelentu (2022)
- Hafta Bandh (1991)
- Hafta Vasuli (1998)
- Hafu (2013)
- Hag in a Black Leather Jacket (1964)
- Hagazussa (2017)
- Haggada Kone (2014)
- Haggard: The Movie (2003)
- Hagiga B'Snuker (1975)
- Hai Apna Dil Toh Awara (2016)
- Hai Golmaal In White House (2013)
- Hai Hai Nayaka (1989)
- Hai Hui Babi Achchi (2001)
- Hai Master (2007)
- Hai Meri Jaan (1991)
- Haida Gwaii: On the Edge of the World (2015)
- Haider (2014)
- Haikara-san ga Tōru (1987)
- Haiku Tunnel (2001)
- Hail Caesar (1994)
- Hail Columbia (1982)
- Hail the Conquering Hero (1944)
- Hail the Judge (1994)
- Hail Mary (1985)
- Hail Satan? (2019)
- Hail the Woman (1921)
- Hail, Caesar! (2016)
- El Haimoune (1984)
- La Haine (1995)
- Hair (1979)
- Hair Brained (2013)
- Hair of the Dog (1962)
- Hair High (2004)
- Hair Is Falling (2011)
- Hair Love (2019)
- Hair-Raising Hare (1946)
- Haircut (1995)
- The Hairdresser's Husband (1990)
- Hairpins (1920)
- Hairshirt (1998)
- Hairspray: (1988 & 2007)
- The Hairy Ape (1944)
- Haiti: Where Did the Money Go (2012)
- The Hairy Bird (1998)
- Hajen som visste för mycket (1989)
- Hakuoki: Warrior Spirit of the Blue Sky (2014)
- Hakuoki: Wild Dance of Kyoto (2013)

==== Hal ====
- Hal: (2013 & 2018)
- Halal Love (2015)
- Halber Mensch (1986)
- Hale County This Morning, This Evening (2018)
- Half Angel: (1936 & 1951)
- Half Baked (1998)
- Half Breed (1914)
- The Half Breed (1922)
- Half Brothers (2020)
- Half a Confession (2004)
- Half a Dozen Babies (1999 TV)
- Half Empty Saddles (1958)
- Half Girlfriend (2017)
- Half Human (1955)
- The Half of It (2020)
- Half Light (2006)
- Half Life: A Parable for the Nuclear Age (1985)
- Half a Loaf of Kung Fu (1978)
- Half Magic (2018)
- Half Marriage (1929)
- The Half Naked Truth (1932)
- Half Nelson (2006)
- Half Past Dead (2002)
- Half-A-Dollar-Bill (1924)
- The Half-Breed: (1916 & 1952)
- The Half-Breed's Way (1912)
- Half-Caste (2004)
- Half-Cocked (1994)
- Half-Fare Hare (1956)
- Half-Life (2008)
- Half-Rate Honeymoon (1936)
- The Half-Way Girl (1925)
- Half-Wits Holiday (1947)
- The Halfway House (1944)
- A Halfway House Christmas (2005)
- Halik sa Hangin (2015)
- Halim (2006)
- Halka (1937)
- Halkaa (2018)
- Hall of Mirrors (2001)
- Hall Pass (2011)
- Hallam Foe (2006)
- The Hallelujah Trail (1965)
- Hallelujah (1929)
- Hallelujah the Hills (1963)
- Hallelujah, I'm a Bum (1933)
- The Haller Case (1933)
- The Halliday Brand (1957)
- Hallo (2007)
- The Hallow (2015)
- Hallowed Ground (2007)
- Halloween series:
  - Halloween: (1978, 2007 & 2018)
  - Halloween II: (1981 & 2009)
  - Halloween III: Season of the Witch (1982)
  - Halloween 4: The Return of Michael Myers (1988)
  - Halloween 5: The Revenge of Michael Myers (1989)
  - Halloween: The Curse of Michael Myers (1995)
  - Halloween H20: 20 Years Later (1998)
  - Halloween: Resurrection (2002)
  - Halloween Kills (2021)
  - Halloween Ends (2022)
- Halloween Is Grinch Night (1977)
- Halloween with the New Addams Family (1977 TV)
- Halloween Night (2006)
- The Halloween Tree (1993 TV)
- Halloweentown series:
  - Halloweentown (1998 TV)
  - Halloweentown II: Kalabar's Revenge (2001 TV)
  - Halloweentown High (2004 TV)
  - Return to Halloweentown (2006 TV)
- Halls of Montezuma (1950)
- Hallucination Generation (1967)
- Halo (1996)
- A Halo for Athuan (1986 TV)
- The Halo Is Slipping (1957)
- Halodhia Choraye Baodhan Khai (1987)
- Halston (2019)
- The Halt (2019)

==== Ham ====
- Ham & Cheese (2004)
- Ham and Eggs (1933)
- Ham and Eggs at the Front (1927)
- Ham on Rye (2019)
- Hamam (1997)
- Hamara Desh (1941)
- Hamara Dil Aapke Paas Hai (2000)
- Hamara Ghar: (1950 & 1964)
- Hamara Sansar (1978)
- Hamare Tumhare (1979)
- Hamari Adhuri Kahani (2015)
- Hamari Baat (1943)
- Hamari Bahu Alka (1982)
- Hamari Betiyan (1936)
- Hamari Paltan (2018)
- Hamari Yaad Aayegi (1961)
- Hambone and Hillie (1983)
- Hamburger Hill (1987)
- Hamburger: The Motion Picture (1986)
- Hameer (2017)
- Hamid (2018)
- Hamilton: (1998, 2006 & 2020)
- Hamilton: In the Interest of the Nation (2012)
- The Hamiltons (2006)
- Hamlet: (1900, 1907, 1908, 1912, 1913, 1917, 1948, 1959 TV, 1961, 1964, 1969, 1990, 1996, 2000, 2009 TV, 2011 & 2025)
- Hamlet 2 (2008)
- Hamlet A.D.D. (2014)
- Hamlet: The Drama of Vengeance (1921)
- Hammerboy (2004)
- Hammers Over the Anvil (1991)
- Hammett (1982)
- Hamnet (2025)
- Hampstead (2017)

==== Han ====
- Hana (2006)
- Hana-bi (1997)
- Hanagatami (2017)
- Hancock (2008)
- The Hand: (1960, 1965 & 1981)
- The Hand of the Artist (1906)
- The Hand of God (2021)
- The Hand That Rocks the Cradle: (1917, 1992 & 2025)
- A Handful of Heroes (1967)
- Handle with Care: (1932, 1935, 1958, 1977 & 1985 TV)
- Handling Ships (1945)
- The Handmaid's Tale (1990)
- The Handmaiden (2016)
- Hands Across the Table (1935)
- The Hands of Orlac: (1924 & 1960)
- Hands over the City (1963)
- Hands of the Ripper (1971)
- Hang 'Em High (1968)
- Hangar 18 (1980)
- Hanging Garden (2005)
- The Hanging Garden (1997)
- The Hanging Tree (1959)
- Hanging Up (2000)
- Hangman: (2015 & 2017)
- The Hangman: (1928, 1959 & 2005)
- Hangmen Also Die! (1943)
- The Hangover series:
  - The Hangover (2009)
  - The Hangover Part II (2011)
  - The Hangover Part III (2013)
- Hangover Square (1945)
- Hangup (1974)
- Hanky Panky (2023)
- Hanna (2011)
- Hanna D. - The Girl from Vondel Park (1984)
- Hanna's War (1988)
- Hannah: (1997 & 2017)
- Hannah Arendt (2012)
- Hannah med H (2003)
- Hannah and Her Brothers (2001)
- Hannah and Her Sisters (1986)
- Hannah Montana and Miley Cyrus: Best of Both Worlds Concert (2008)
- Hannah Montana: The Movie (2009)
- Hannah Takes the Stairs (2007)
- Hannele's Journey to Heaven (1922)
- Hanneles Himmelfahrt (1934)
- Hannerl and Her Lovers: (1921 & 1936)
- Hannibal: (1959, 2001 & 2006 TV)
- Hannibal Rising (2007)
- Hannie Caulder (1971)
- Hanover Street (1979)
- Hans Christian Andersen (1952)
- Hans Christian Andersen's The Little Mermaid (1975)
- Hans in Every Street (1930)
- Hans onsdagsveninde (1943)
- Hansa (2012)
- Hansel and Gretel: (1954 Janssen, 1954 Genschow, 1983 TV, 2002, 2007 & 2013)
- Hansel & Gretel Get Baked (2013)
- Hansel and Gretel: An Opera Fantasy (1954)
- Hansel & Gretel: Witch Hunters (2013)
- Hansel vs. Gretel (2015)
- Hanson and the Beast (2017)
- Hanste Aansoo (1950)
- Hanste Khelte: (1984 & 1994)
- Hanste Zakhm (1973)
- Hansuli Banker Upakatha (1962)
- Hanthakana Sanchu (1980)
- Hantu Gangster (2012)
- Hantu Jeruk Purut (2006)
- Hantu Kak Limah (2018)
- Hanuman (2005)
- Hanussen: (1955 & 1988)

==== Hap ====
- Hapkido (1972)
- Happening (2021)
- The Happening: (1967 & 2008)
- Happenstance (2000)
- Happi (2019)
- Happidrome (1943)
- The Happiest Day in the Life of Olli Mäki (2016)
- The Happiest Days of Your Life (1950)
- The Happiest Millionaire (1967)
- Happiest Season (2020)
- Happily (2021)
- Happily Ever After: (1985, 1990, 2004 & 2009)
- Happily Mixed Up (2014)
- Happily N'Ever After (2007)
- Happily N'Ever After 2: Snow White—Another Bite @ the Apple (2009)
- Happiness: (1917, 1924, 1935, 1957, 1998, 2007, 2013 & 2016)
- Happiness Ahead: (1928 & 1934)
- Happiness for Beginners (2023)
- Happiness C.O.D. (1935)
- Happiness Comes at Nine o'Clock (1961)
- Happiness Continues: A Jonas Brothers Concert Film (2020)
- Happiness Costs Nothing (2003)
- Happiness Is (2009)
- Happiness Is Coming (2018)
- Happiness Is in the Field (1995)
- Happiness Is a Four-letter Word (2016)
- Happiness Is Loving Your Teacher (1977)
- Happiness Is the Main Thing (1941)
- Happiness Is... Part 2 (2019)
- The Happiness of the Katakuris (2002)
- Happiness a la Mode (1919)
- Happiness Never Comes Alone (2012)
- Happiness Runs (2010)
- Happiness of Three Women (1917)
- The Happiness of Three Women (1954)
- Happiness for Two (1940)
- Happiness is a Warm Gun (2002)
- HappinessCharge PreCure! the Movie: The Ballerina of the Land of Dolls (2014)
- Happy: (1933, 2006, 2011 & 2015)
- Happy Accidents (2000)
- Happy Anniversary: (1959 & 2018)
- Happy Anniversary and Goodbye (1974 TV)
- Happy Arenas: (1935 & 1958)
- Happy Bhag Jayegi (2016)
- Happy Birthday: (1998, 2002, 2009, 2016 American, 2016 Indian, 2021, 2022 Indian, 2022 Sri Lankan & 2025)
- Happy Birthday, Gemini (1980)
- Happy Birthday, Marsha! (2018)
- Happy Birthday to Me: (1981 & 2024)
- Happy Birthday Mummyji (2021)
- Happy Birthday, Wanda June (1971)
- Happy Camp (2014)
- Happy Camper (2004)
- Happy Campers (2001)
- Happy Christmas (2014)
- Happy Day (1939)
- Happy Days: (1929, 1978, 1991, 2007 & 2018)
- Happy Days Are Here Again (1936)
- Happy Death Day (2017)
- Happy Death Day 2U (2019)
- Happy End: (1967, 1999, 2003, 2009 & 2017)
- Happy Ending: (2014 & 2024)
- Happy Endings (2005)
- Happy Endings? (2009)
- Happy Ero Christmas (2003)
- Happy Ever After: (1932 & 1954)
- Happy Ever Afters (2009)
- Happy Face (2018)
- Happy Face Killer (2014 TV)
- Happy Face Murders (1999 TV)
- Happy Family: (2002, 2006, 2010 & 2017)
- A Happy Family (1935)
- The Happy Family: (1936 & 1952)
- Happy Feet (2006)
- Happy Feet Two (2011)
- Happy Few (2010)
- Happy Flight: (1949 & 2008)
- Happy Funerals (2013)
- Happy Ghost (1984)
- Happy Ghost II (1985)
- Happy Ghost III (1986)
- Happy Ghost IV (1990)
- Happy Ghost V (1991)
- The Happy Ghost (1941)
- Happy Go Lovely (1951)
- Happy Go Lucky: (1936, 1943, 1946, 1972, 1987 & 2014)
- Happy Gilmore (1996)
- Happy Gilmore 2 (2025)
- Happy as the Grass Was Green (1973)
- Happy Happy Ga (2010)
- Happy Happy Joy Joy: The Ren and Stimpy Story (2020)
- Happy Hardy and Heer (2020)
- Happy Hearts: (1932 & 2007)
- Happy Hell Night (1991)
- Happy Here and Now (2002)
- Happy Heroes series:
  - Happy Heroes (2013)
  - Happy Heroes 2: Qiyuan Planet Wars (2014)
  - Happy Heroes: The Stones (2022)
  - Happy Heroes: Multiverse Rescue (2024)
  - Happy Heroes: Rebal Rescue (2025)
- Happy Hobos (1979)
- Happy Holidays (2024)
- The Happy Hooker Goes to Washington (1977)
- Happy Hotel (2012)
- Happy Hour: (2003, 2015 German & 2015 Japanese)
- Happy Hunting (2016)
- Happy Husbands: (2010 & 2011)
- Happy Is the Bride (1958)
- Happy Journey: (1943, 2014 Malayalam & 2014 Marathi & 2025)
- Happy Killers (2010)
- Happy Land (1943)
- Happy Landing: (1934 & 1938)
- Happy as Lazzaro (2018)
- Happy Little Submarines 4: Adventure of Octopus (2014)
- Happy Little Submarine Magic Box of Time (2015)
- Happy Little Submarine: 20000 Leagues under the Sea (2018)
- Happy Lucky (2018)
- A Happy Man: (1932 & 2009)
- Happy Memories (1981)
- Happy Mother's Day, Love George (1973)
- Happy New Year: (1987, 2008, 2014 & 2017)
- Happy New Year '49 (1986)
- Happy New Year, Colin Burstead (2018)
- Happy Old Year (2019)
- Happy People: A Year in the Taiga (2010)
- Happy Phirr Bhag Jayegi (2018)
- Happy Place (2020)
- The Happy Prince: (1974 & 2018)
- Happy Sad (2018)
- Happy Sardar (2019)
- Happy Single (2023)
- Happy Sixteen (1982)
- Happy Slapping (2011)
- Happy Tears (2009)
- Happy Though Married (1919)
- Happy Times: (1943, 2000, 2014 & 2021)
- Happy Together: (1989 American, 1989 Hong Kong, 1997 & 2018)
- Happy Tree Friends (2012)
- Happy Valley (2014)
- Happy Wedding: (2016 & 2018)
- Happy-Go-Lucky (2008)
- Happy, Happy (2010)
- Happy, Texas (1999)
- HAPPYEND (2024)
- Happythankyoumoreplease (2010)

==== Haq ====
- Haq: (2010 & 2025)
- Haqdaar (1981)
- Haqdar (1946)
- Haqeeqat: (1964, 1985 & 1995)
- Haqqu (1996)
- Haque (1991)

==== Har ====
- Har Dil Jo Pyar Karega (2000)
- Hara (2014)
- Hara-Kiri: Death of a Samurai (2011)
- Harakiri: (1919 & 1962)
- The Harassed Hero (1954)
- The Harbinger (2022)
- The Harbour Baron (1928)
- The Harbour Bride (1927)
- The Harbour Lights (1914)
- The Harbour Lights (1923)
- Hard to Be a God (2013)
- Hard Boiled (1992)
- The Hard-Boiled Canary (1941)
- Hard Candy (2005)
- Hard Core Logo (1996)
- The Hard Corps (2006)
- A Hard Day (2014)
- A Hard Day (2021)
- A Hard Day's Night (1964)
- The Hard Easy (2006)
- Hard Eight (1996)
- The Hard Game (1956)
- The Hard Hombre (1931)
- Hard Kill (2020)
- Hard to Kill (1990)
- The Hard Life of an Adventurer (1941)
- Hard Luck: (1921 & 2006)
- Hard Luck Love Song (2021)
- The Hard Man (1957)
- Hard Men (1996)
- A Hard Name (2009)
- The Hard Part Begins (1973)
- Hard Rain (1998)
- The Hard Ride (1971)
- Hard Rock Zombies (1985)
- The Hard Stop (2015)
- Hard Target (1993)
- Hard Ticket to Hawaii (1987)
- Hard Times: (1915, 1975 & 1988)
- The Hard Truth (1994)
- Hard Truths (2024)
- The Hard Way (1916)
- The Hard Way (1943)
- The Hard Way (1980) (TV)
- The Hard Way (1991)
- The Hard Word (2002)
- Hardball (2001)
- Hardbodies (1984)
- Hardbodies 2 (1986)
- Hardcore (1977)
- Hardcore (1979)
- The Harder They Come (1972)
- The Harder They Fall (1956)
- The Harder They Fall (2021)
- Hardly a Criminal (1949)
- Hardly Working (1981)
- The Hardship of Miles Standish (1940)
- Hardware (1990)
- Hardware Wars (1977)
- The Hardy Bucks Movie (2013)
- The Hardys Ride High (1939)
- The Hare-Brained Hypnotist (1942)
- Hare Brush (1955)
- The Hare Census (1973)
- Hare Force (1944)
- A Hare Grows in Manhattan (1947)
- The Hare Mail (1931)
- Hare Trigger (1945)
- Hare-um Scare-um (1939)
- Hari (2018)
- The Harimaya Bridge (2009)
- Harka (2022)
- Harlan County, USA (1976)
- Harlem (1943)
- The Harlem Globetrotters (1951)
- Harlem Nights (1989)
- Harlequin (1980)
- Harley Davidson and the Marlboro Man (1991)
- Harlot (1964)
- Harlot (1971)
- A Harlot's Progress (2006) (TV)
- Harlow: (Magma 1965 & Paramount 1965)
- Harmful Insect (2002)
- The Harmonium in My Memory (1999)
- Harmony (2015)
- The Harms Case (1987)
- Harold (2008)
- Harold & Kumar series:
  - Harold & Kumar Go to White Castle (2004)
  - Harold & Kumar Escape from Guantanamo Bay (2008)
  - A Very Harold & Kumar Christmas (2011)
- Harold and the Purple Crayon (2024)
- Harold and Maude (1971)
- A Harp in Hock (1927)
- Harper (1966)
- The Harpist (1997)
- The Harrad Experiment (1973)
- Harriet (2019)
- Harriet the Spy (1996)
- Harriet the Spy: Blog Wars (2010)
- Harrison's Flowers (2001)
- Harry Brown (2009)
- Harry Chapin: When in Doubt, Do Something (2020)
- Harry and the Hendersons (1987)
- The Harry Hill Movie (2013)
- Harry Potter series:
  - Harry Potter and the Philosopher's Stone (2001)
  - Harry Potter and the Chamber of Secrets (2002)
  - Harry Potter and the Prisoner of Azkaban (2004)
  - Harry Potter and the Goblet of Fire (2005)
  - Harry Potter and the Order of the Phoenix (2007)
  - Harry Potter and the Half-Blood Prince (2009)
  - Harry Potter and the Deathly Hallows – Part 1 (2010)
  - Harry Potter and the Deathly Hallows – Part 2 (2011)
- Harry and Tonto (1974)
- Harry and Walter Go to New York (1976)
- Harsh Times (2005)
- The Hart of London (1970)
- Hart's War (2002)
- Haru (1996)
- Harum Scarum (1965)
- Haruta & Chika (2017)
- Harvard Beats Yale 29–29 (2008)
- Harvard Man (2001)
- Harvard, Here I Come (1941)
- Harvest (1936)
- Harvest (1937)
- Harvest (1967)
- The Harvest (1993)
- The Harvest (2010)
- The Harvest (2013)
- Harvest of Empire: A History of Latinos in America (2012)
- Harvest of Fire (1996 TV)
- Harvest Gold (1945)
- Harvest of Hate (1978 TV)
- The Harvest of Hate (1929)
- Harvest Home (1995)
- Harvest Home (2009)
- Harvest Melody (1943)
- The Harvest Month (1956)
- The Harvest Moon (1920)
- The Harvest Shall Come (1942)
- Harvest Time (2004)
- Harvest: 3,000 Years (1976)
- Harvey: (1950 & 1996 TV)
- The Harvey Girls (1946)
- Harvie Krumpet (2003)

==== Has ====
- Has Anybody Seen My Gal? (1952)
- Has Anyone Seen My Girl? (2021)
- Has the World Gone Mad! (1923)
- Hasaki Ya Suda (2011)
- Hasami Otoko (2005)
- Hasan Minhaj: Homecoming King (2017)
- Hasanaginica (1967)
- Haseena (2018)
- Haseena Atom Bomb (1990)
- Haseena Maan Jaayegi (1999)
- Haseena Maan Jayegi (1968)
- Haseena Parkar (2017)
- Haseenon Ka Devata (1971)
- Hasemann's Daughters (1920)
- Hash House Blues (1931)
- A Hash House Fraud (1915)
- Hashtag Horror (2015)
- Hashish, the Paradise of Hell (1921)
- Hasida Hebbuli (1983)
- Hasina (2004)
- Hasina: A Daughter's Tale (2018)
- Hasina Aur Nagina (1996)
- Hasina Dacait (2001)
- Hasiru Thorana (1970)
- Hasmukh Saab ki Wasihat (2015)
- Hason Raja: (2002 & 2017)
- The Hassled Hooker (1972)
- Hasta después de muerta (1916)
- Hasta el viento tiene miedo (1968)
- Hasta que perdió Jalisco (1945)
- Hasta que se ponga el sol (1973)
- The Hasty Hare (1952)
- The Hasty Heart (1949)
- Hasyam (2020)
- Hasyaratna Ramakrishna (1982)

==== Hat ====
- The Hat (1999)
- The Hat Box Mystery (1947)
- Hat Check Girl (1932)
- Hat Check Honey (1944)
- Hat, Coat, and Glove (1934)
- Hatari! (1962)
- Hatch (2024)
- Hatchet series:
  - Hatchet (2006)
  - Hatchet II (2010)
  - Hatchet III (2013)
  - Victor Crowley (2017)
- Hatchet for the Honeymoon (1970)
- The Hatchet Man (1932)
- Hatching (2022)
- The Hatching (2014)
- Hatching Pete (2009) (TV)
- Hate (1920 & 1995)
- Hate Crime: (2005 & 2013)
- Hate Crimes in the Heartland (2014)
- Hate for Hate (1967)
- Hate Mail (1993)
- Hate Is My God (1969)
- The Hate Ship (1929)
- Hate Story series:
  - Hate Story (20120)
  - Hate Story 2 (2014)
  - Hate Story 3 (2015)
  - Hate Story 4 (2018)
- Hate Thy Neighbor (1968)
- The Hate U Give (2018)
- Hated: GG Allin and the Murder Junkies (1994)
- The Hatfields and the McCoys (1975 TV)
- The Hateful Eight (2015)
- The Hater: (2020 & 2022)
- The Hater of Men (1917)
- The Haters (2015)
- Hateship, Loveship (2013)
- A Hatful of Rain (1957)
- Hathara Denama Soorayo: (1971 & 2008)
- Hathara Varan (2021)
- Hatharu Halha (2019)
- Hatharu Udhares (2004)
- Hathat Dekha (1967)
- Hathiar (1979)
- Hathyar: (1989 & 2002)
- Hati Tayo sa Magdamag (1988)
- Hating Alison Ashley (2005)
- The Hating Game (2021)
- Hating Kapatid (2010)
- Hatred: (1977 & 2012)
- Hatrick Hodi Maga (2009)
- Hats Off: (1927, 1936 & 2008)
- Hatsukoi Jigokuhen (1968)
- Hatter's Castle (1942)
- The Hatter's Ghost (1982)
- Hattie (2011 TV)
- The Hatton Garden Job (2017)
- Hattrick (2007)
- Hatun Phaqcha, The Healing Land (2021)
- Hatya: (1988 & 2004)
- Hatya Kaand (1998)
- Hatyapuri (2022)
- Hatyara: (1977 & 1998)

==== Hau ====
- Hauling (2010)
- Haulout (2022)
- Haunt: (2013 & 2019)
- Haunt Season (2024)
- Haunted: (1977, 1995 & 2007)
- The Haunted (1991)
- Haunted – 3D (2011)
- Haunted 3D: Ghosts of the Past (2026)
- Haunted Castle (2001)
- The Haunted Castle: (1897 British, 1897 French, 1921 & 1960)
- Haunted Changi (2010)
- The Haunted Cinema (2014)
- Haunted Forest: (2007 & 2017)
- Haunted Gold (1932)
- Haunted Honeymoon (1986)
- The Haunted Honeymoon (1925)
- The Haunted Hotel (1907)
- Haunted House: (1940 & 2004)
- A Haunted House (2013)
- The Haunted House: (1913, 1921, 1928, 1929 & 2005)
- A Haunted House 2 (2014)
- The Haunted House of Horror (1969)
- Haunted Lighthouse (2003)
- Haunted Mansion: (1998, 2015 & 2023)
- The Haunted Mansion (2003)
- The Haunted Palace (1963)
- Haunted Road (2014)
- The Haunted Strangler (1958)
- Haunted Summer (1988)
- A Haunted Turkish Bathhouse (1975)
- The Haunted World of El Superbeasto (2009)
- The Haunting: (1963 & 1999)
- The Haunting in Connecticut (2009)
- The Haunting in Connecticut 2: Ghosts of Georgia (2013)
- Haunting Me (2007)
- The Haunting of Molly Hartley (2008)
- The Haunting of Sharon Tate (2019)
- Hauser's Memory (1970 TV)
- Haute Tension (2005)
- À Hauteur d'homme (2003)

==== Hav ====
- Hav Plenty (1997)
- Hava Aney Dey (2004)
- Hava, Maryam, Ayesha (2019)
- Havana (1990)
- Havana, from on High (2019)
- Havana Rose (1951)
- Havana Widows (1933)
- Have Fun, Vasya! (2017)
- Have a Good Funeral, My Friend... Sartana Will Pay (1970)
- Have a Good Trip: Adventures in Psychedelics (2020)
- Have a Heart (1934)
- Have a Little Faith (2011 TV)
- Have Mare Hira Nathi Ghasva (2009)
- Have Mercy on Us All (2007)
- Have a Nice Day (2017)
- Have a Nice Day! (2023)
- Have No Fear: The Life of Pope John Paul II (2005 TV)
- Have Rocket, Will Travel (1959)
- Have a Song on Your Lips (2015)
- Have Sunshine in Your Heart (1953)
- Have Sword, Will Travel (1969)
- Have Thase Baap Re (2019)
- Have You Got Any Castles (1938)
- Have You Heard Judi Singh? (2025)
- Have You Seen Drum Recently? (1989)
- Have You Seen This Woman? (2022)
- Haven (2006)
- Haven't We Met Before? (2002)
- Havoc: (1972, 2005 & 2025)
- Le Havre (2011)

==== Haw–Haz ====
- Hawa: (2003, 2022 Bangladeshi & 2022 French)
- Hawaa Hawaai (2014)
- Hawaii: (1966 & 2013)
- Hawaii Calls (1938)
- Hawaiian Aye Aye (1964)
- Hawaiian Buckaroo (1938)
- Hawaiian Holiday (1937)
- Hawaiian Nights (1939)
- The Hawaiians (1970)
- Hawak Ko Buhay Mo (1996)
- Hawalaat (1987)
- Hawas: (1974 & 2004)
- Hawayein (2003)
- Hawi (2010)
- The Hawk: (1931, 1935 & 1993)
- Hawk of the Caribbean (1962)
- Hawk of the Hills (1927)
- Hawk of the Nile (1950)
- Hawk the Slayer (1980)
- Hawk of the Wilderness (1938)
- Hawk's Vengeance (1996)
- Hawke (2010 TV)
- Hawkeye (1988)
- Hawking: (2004 TV & 2013)
- Hawks (1988)
- The Hawks and the Sparrows (1966)
- Hawley's of High Street (1933)
- Hawmps! (1976)
- Hawthorne of the U.S.A. (1919)
- Häxan (1922)
- Hay que bañar al nene (1958)
- Hay que romper la rutina (1974)
- The Hay Ride (1937)
- Hayao Miyazaki and the Heron (2024)
- Hayabusa: Harukanaru Kikan (2012)
- Hayate the Combat Butler! Heaven Is a Place on Earth (2011)
- Hayedeh: Legendary Persian Diva (2009)
- Hayfever (2010)
- Hayflower and Quiltshoe series:
  - Hayflower and Quiltshoe (2002)
  - Hayflower, Quiltshoe and the Rubens Brothers (2017)
  - Hayflower, Quiltshoe and the Feisty First-grader (2020)
  - Hayflower, Quiltshoe and the Chicken (2024)
- Hayop Ka! (2020)
- Hayot afsunlari (2021)
- Hayride to Hell (1995)
- Hayseed: (1997 & 2023)
- The Hayseed (1919)
- Hayseed Romance (1935)
- Haystacks and Steeples (1916)
- Haywire: (1980 TV & 2011)
- Hayya 3: Gaza (2025)
- Hazaaron Khwaishein Aisi (2005)
- Hazard: (1921, 1948 & 2005)
- A Hazard of Hearts (1987 TV)
- Hazardous and Unhealthy (2003)
- Hazardous Valley (1927)
- Haze: (2005, 2010 & 2016)
- Hazmat (2013)

=== He ===
- He (2012)
- He Can't Stop Doing It (1962)
- He Comes Up Smiling (1918)
- He Couldn't Say No (1938)
- He Couldn't Take It (1933)
- He Died with a Felafel in His Hand (2001)
- He Dreams of Giants (2019)
- He Fell in Love with His Wife (1916)
- He Fought for the U.S.A. (1911)
- He Found a Star (1941)
- He Goes Right, She Goes Left! (1928)
- He Got Game (1998)
- He Has Nothing But Kung Fu (1977)
- He Hated Pigeons (2015)
- He Hired the Boss (1943)
- He Is Charming (1932)
- He Is My Brother (1975)
- He Is Not Dimon to You (2017)
- He Knew Women (1930)
- He Knows You're Alone (1980)
- He Laughed Last (1956)
- He Learned About Women (1933)
- He Loves Me... He Loves Me Not (2002)
- He Makes Me Feel Like Dancin' (1983)
- He Named Me Malala (2015)
- He Never Died (2015)
- He Ran All the Way (1951)
- He Rides Tall (1964)
- He Said, She Said (1991)
- He Sees You When You're Sleeping (2002) (TV)
- He Snoops to Conquer (1944)
- He Stayed for Breakfast (1940)
- He Walked by Night (1948)
- He Walked Through the Fields (1967)
- He Wanted Work (1914)
- He Was Cool (2004)
- He Was Her Man (1934)
- He Was a Quiet Man (2007)
- He Went That Way (2023)
- He Who Gets Slapped (1924)
- He Who Must Die (1957)
- He Who Rides a Tiger (1965)
- He Won a Ranch (1914)
- He's All That (2021)
- He's Just Not That Into You (2009)
- He's Way More Famous Than You (2013)
- He's a Woman, She's a Man (1994)

==== Hea ====
- Head (1968)
- Head Above Water (1997)
- Head in the Clouds (2004)
- Head Count (2018)
- Head Games (2012)
- The Head Hunter (2018)
- Head Office (1985)
- Head of State (2003)
- Head On: (1980 & 1998)
- Head-On (2004)
- Head Over Heels: (1922, 1937, 1979 & 2001)
- Headhunters (2011)
- Heading South (2005)
- The Headless Horseman: (1922 & 1973)
- Heads of State (2025)
- The Headsman (2005)
- Healers for All Reasons (2005)
- Health (1980)
- Hear My Song (1991)
- The Hearse (1980)
- Heart Attack: (2014 & 2015)
- The Heart of the Bear (2001)
- Heart of the Beast (2026)
- Heart Blackened (2017)
- The Heart Breaker (1925)
- Hearts of Darkness: A Filmmaker's Apocalypse (1991)
- The Heart Is Deceitful Above All Things (2004)
- Heart of Dixie (1989)
- Heart of a Dog (1988)
- Heart of Dragon (1985)
- Heart Eyes (2025)
- The Heart of the Game (2006)
- Heart of Glass (1976)
- Heart to Heart (1962)
- Heart for Heaven (2015)
- The Heart Is a Lonely Hunter (1968)
- Heart and Souls (1993)
- The Heart's Cry (1994)
- Heartaches (1981)
- The Heart Breaker (1925)
- The Heartbreak Kid: (1972, 1993 & 2007)
- Heartbreak Ridge (1986)
- Heartbreak Hotel (1988)
- Heartbreaker: (1983 & 2010)
- Heartbreakers: (1984 & 2001)
- Heartburn (1986)
- Heartfall Arises (2016)
- Heartland: (1979 & 2026)
- Heartless: (1995, 2005, 2009 & 2014)
- The Hearts of Age (1934)
- Hearts in Atlantis (2001)
- Hearts of Darkness: A Filmmaker's Apocalypse (1991)
- Hearts in Dixie (1929)
- Hearts in Hock (1919)
- Hearts and Minds (1974)
- Hearts of the World (1918)
- Heartthrob (2017)
- Heartworn Highways (1981)
- Heat: (1963, 1972, 1986, 1995 & 2006)
- The Heat (2013)
- Heat and Dust (1983)
- Heat Team (2004)
- Heathers (1988)
- Heatwave (1982)
- Heaven: (1987 & 2002)
- Heaven with a Barbed Wire Fence (1939)
- Heaven Can Wait: (1943 & 1978)
- Heaven and Earth: (1990 & 1993)
- Heaven and Earth Magic (1957)
- Heaven Is a Playground (1991)
- Heaven Is for Real (2014)
- Heaven Knows What (2014)
- Heaven Knows, Mr. Allison (1957)
- Heaven Only Knows (1947)
- Heaven's Burning (1998)
- Heaven's Gate (1980)
- Heaven's Prisoners (1996)
- Heaven's Story (2010)
- Heavenly Creatures (1994)
- Heavens Above! (1963)
- Heavy (1995)
- The Heavy (2010)
- Heavy Metal (1981)
- Heavy Metal 2000 (2000)
- Heavy Metal Parking Lot (1986)
- Heavy Petting: (1989 & 2007)
- Heavy Traffic (1973)
- Heavyweights (1995)

==== Heb–Hef ====
- Hebbet Ramakka (2018)
- Hebe: A Estrela do Brasil (2019)
- The Hebrew Hammer (2004)
- The Heck with Hollywood! (1991)
- Heckler (2007)
- The Heckler (1940)
- The Heckling Hare (1941)
- Hectic Knife (2016)
- Hector: (1987 & 2015)
- Hector the Mighty (1972)
- Hector and the Search for Happiness (2014)
- Hector's Bunyip (1986 TV)
- Hedd Wyn (1992)
- Hedda (1975)
- Hedda Gabler: (1920, 1925, 1961 & 2016)
- Hedgehog (2017)
- The Hedgehog (2009)
- Hedgehog in the Fog (1975)
- Hedgehog's Home (2017)
- Hedi (2016)
- Hedi Schneider Is Stuck (2015)
- Hedwig and the Angry Inch (2001)
- Heebee Jeebees (1927)
- Heebie Jeebies (2013 TV)
- Heegondhu Dina (2018)
- Heena Hoyana Samanallu (2017)
- Heer (1955)
- Heer and Hero (2013)
- Heer Maan Ja (2019)
- Heer Raanjha (1970)
- Heer Ranjha: (1932, 1970 & 1992)
- Heer Sial: (1938 & 1965)
- Heera (1973)
- Heera Aur Pathar (1964)
- Heera-Moti (1979)
- Heera Panna (1973)
- Heeralaal Pannalal (1978)
- Heeralal Pannalal (1999)
- Heeron Ka Chor (1982)
- Hefner: Unauthorized (1999 TV)

==== Heg–Hej ====
- Hegel's Angel (2018)
- Hei de Vencer (1924)
- A Heidelberg Romance (1951)
- Heidi: (1937, 1952, 1965, 1968, 2005 animated, 2005 live-action & 2015)
- Heidi 4 Paws (2008)
- The Heidi Chronicles (1995)
- Heidi Fleiss: Hollywood Madam (1995)
- Heidi's Song (1982)
- The Heifer (1985)
- The Height (1957)
- Height of the Wave (2019)
- Heights (2004)
- Heiko (2008)
- Heimat: (1938 & 1984)
- Heimat Bells (1952)
- The Heineken Kidnapping (2011)
- Heintje: A Heart Goes on a Journey (1969)
- Heinz in the Moon (1934)
- The Heir of the Ages (1917)
- The Heir to the Hoorah (1916)
- The Heir to Næsbygaard (1965)
- Heir to Trouble (1935)
- The Heiress (1949)
- The Heiress at Coffee Dan's (1916)
- The Heiress of the Count of Monte Cristo (1919)
- The Heiresses: (1980 & 2018)
- The Heirloom Mystery (1936)
- The Heirs (2008)
- The Heirs of Uncle James (1924)
- Heist: (2001 & 2015)
- The Heist: (1970, 1976, 1989 TV, 2001 & 2008)
- The Heist of the Country (2020)
- A Heist with Markiplier (2019)
- Heist: Who Stole the American Dream? (2011)
- Heiter bis Wolkig (2012)
- Heißer Sommer (1968)
- Heja Roland! (1966)

==== Hel ====
- Held to Answer (1923)
- Held for Damages (1916)
- Held by the Enemy (1920)
- Held Hostage (2009)
- Held In Trust (1920)
- Held by the Law (1927)
- Held einer Nacht (1935)
- Held for Ransom: (1938 & 2000)
- Held Up (1999)
- Held Up for the Makin's (1920)
- Heldenkampf in Schnee und Eis (1917)
- Helen: (2009 & 2019)
- Helen the Baby Fox (2006)
- Helen of Four Gates (1920)
- Helen Keller in Her Story (1954)
- Helen of Troy (1956)
- Helen's Babies (1924)
- Helena (1924)
- Helena from the Wedding (2010)
- Helga – Vom Werden des menschlichen Lebens (1967)
- Heli (2013)
- Helicopter Canada (1966)
- Helicopter Eela (2018)
- Helicopter Mom (2014)
- Heliopolis (2009)
- Helios (2015)
- Heliotrope (1920)
- Helium (2014)
- Hell Comes to Frogtown (1988)
- Hell Divers (1931)
- Hell Drivers (1957)
- Hell Fest (2018)
- Hell on Frisco Bay (1955)
- Hell Hath No Fury (1991 TV)
- Hell Is for Heroes (1962)
- Hell or High Water (2016)
- Hell House LLC series:
  - Hell House LLC (2015)
  - Hell House LLC II: The Abaddon Hotel (2018)
  - Hell House LLC III: Lake of Fire (2019)
  - Hell House LLC Origins: The Carmichael Manor (2023)
  - Hell House LLC: Lineage (2025)
- Hell of the Living Dead (1980)
- Hell Night (1981)
- Hell in the Pacific (1969)
- Hell Ride (2007)
- Hell of a Summer (2023)
- Hell's Angels (1930)
- Hell's Angels '69 (1969)
- Hell's Belles (1969)
- Hell's Bells (1929)
- Hell's Bloody Devils (1970)
- Hell's Cargo (1939)
- Hell's Crater (1918)
- Hell's Crossroads (1957)
- Hell's Hinges (1916)
- Hell-Bent for Election (1944)
- Hell Bent (1918)
- Hellbent (2004)
- Hellblazers (2022)
- Hellboy series:
  - Hellboy: (2004 & 2019)
  - Hellboy: Sword of Storms (2006 TV)
  - Hellboy: Blood and Iron (2007 TV)
  - Hellboy 2: The Golden Army (2008)
  - Hellboy: The Crooked Man (2024)
- The Hellcats (1968)
- Hellcats of the Navy (1957)
- Hellfighters (1968)
- Hellions (2015)
- Hello Again: (1987 & 2017)
- Hello God (1951)
- Hello Herman (2013)
- Hello I Must Be Going: (2012 & 2014)
- Hello, Dolly! (1969)
- Hello, My Dolly Girlfriend (2013)
- Hello, My Name Is Doris (2016)
- Hellraiser series:
  - Hellraiser: (1987 & 2022)
  - Hellbound: Hellraiser II (1988)
  - Hellraiser III: Hell on Earth (1992)
  - Hellraiser: Bloodline (1996)
  - Hellraiser: Inferno (2000)
  - Hellraiser: Hellseeker (2002)
  - Hellraiser: Deader (2005)
  - Hellraiser: Hellworld (2005)
  - Hellraiser: Revelations (2011)
  - Hellraiser: Judgment (2018)
- Hells Angels on Wheels (1967)
- The Hellstrom Chronicle (1971)
- Hellzapoppin' (1941)
- The Help (2011)
- Help! (1965)
- Helter Skelter: (1949, 1976 TV & 2004 TV)
- Helvetica (2007)

==== Hem–Hep ====
- Hema Hema (2016)
- Hema Hemeelu (1979)
- Hemanta (2016)
- Hemantharaathri (1978)
- Hemanter Pakhi (2002)
- Hemareddy Mallamma (1946)
- Hemavathi (1977)
- Hemavin Kadhalargal (1985)
- Hemel (2012)
- Hemet, or the Landlady Don't Drink Tea (2023)
- Hemingway & Gellhorn (2012)
- Hemingway: A Portrait (1999)
- Hemingway's Adventures of a Young Man (1962)
- Hemlock Hoax, the Detective (1910)
- Hemlock Society (2012)
- Hemorrhage (2012)
- Hemp for Victory (1942)
- Hempsters: Plant the Seed (2010)
- A Hen in the Wind (1948)
- Henchmen (2018)
- Henge (2012)
- Henna (1991)
- Hennessy (1975)
- Henri (2013)
- Henry Fool (1997)
- Henry & June (1990)
- Henry & Me (2014)
- Henry Poole Is Here (2008)
- Henry V: (1944, 1989 & 2012 TV)
- Henry VIII (1911)
- Henry VIII and His Six Wives (1972)
- Henry: Portrait of a Serial Killer (1986)
- Henry: Portrait of a Serial Killer, Part II (1996)
- Henry's Crime (2011)
- Hentai Kamen (2013)
- Hentai Kamen: Abnormal Crisis (2016)
- Hepcat in the Funky Hat (1961)
- Hepcat in the Funky Hat: The 20,000,000 Yen Arm (1961)
- Hephzibah (1998)

==== Her ====
- Her (2013)
- Her (2024)
- Her Accidental Husband (1923)
- Her Adventurous Night (1946)
- Her Alibi (1989)
- Her American Husband (1918)
- Her Awakening (1911)
- Her Battle for Existence (1910)
- Her Beloved Enemy (1917)
- Her Beloved Villain (1920)
- Her Benny (1920)
- Her Best Move (2007)
- Her Better Self (1917)
- Her Big Adventure (1926)
- Her Big Night (1926)
- Her Big Story (1913)
- Her Bitter Cup (1916)
- Her Bleeding Heart (1916)
- Her Blue Sky (2019)
- Her Body (2023)
- Her Body in Bond (1918)
- Her Bodyguard (1933)
- Her Bounty (1914)
- Her Boy: (1915 & 1918)
- Her Boy Friend (1924)
- Her Bridal Nightmare (1920)
- Her Brother (1960)
- Her Cardboard Lover (1942)
- Her – Chapter 1 (2023)
- Her Choice: (1912 & 1915)
- Her Chum's Brother (1910)
- Her Code of Honor (1919)
- Her Composition (2015)
- Her Convert (1915)
- Her Corporal (1956)
- Her Costly Affair (1996 TV)
- Her Country First (1918)
- Her Country's Call (1917)
- Her Crowning Glory (1911)
- Her Friend the Bandit (1914)
- Her & Him (2019)
- Her Love Boils Bathwater (2016)
- Her Name Was Christa (2020)
- Her Penalty (1921)
- Her Sister from Paris (1925)
- Her Smell (2018)
- Hera Pheri: (1976 & 2000)
- Herb (2007)
- Herbie series:
  - Herbie Goes Bananas (1980)
  - Herbie Goes to Monte Carlo (1977)
  - Herbie Rides Again (1974)
  - Herbie: Fully Loaded (2005)
  - The Love Bug (1969)
- Hercules: (1958, 1983, 1997 & 2014)
- Hercules Against the Moon Men (1965)
- Hercules in the Haunted World (1961)
- Hercules and the Masked Rider (1963)
- Hercules in New York (1970)
- Hercules Unchained (1959)
- The Herdsman (1982)
- Here (2024)
- Here Before (2021)
- Here Come the Munsters (1995 TV)
- Here Comes the Boom (2012)
- Here Comes Happiness (1941)
- Here Comes Mr. Jordan (1941)
- Here Comes the Navy (1934)
- Here Comes Peter Cottontail (1971 TV)
- Here on Earth (2000)
- Here We Go Round the Mulberry Bush (1967)
- Here Alone (2016)
- Here Are the Young Men (2020)
- Here Is Your Life (1966)
- Hereafter (2010)
- Hereditary (2018)
- Hero: (1982, 1983, 1984, 1985, 1987, 1992, 1997, 2002, 2006, 2012, 2015 Hindi & 2015 Japanese)
- The Hero: (1917, 1923, 1966, 2004 & 2017)
- The Hero of the Dardanelles (1915)
- The Hero of Color City (2014)
- Hero of the Red-Light District (1960)
- Hero and the Terror (1988)
- Hero – Beyond the Boundary of Time (1993)
- A Hero's Life (1994)
- Heroes: (1977 & 2008)
- Heroes of the East (1978)
- Heroes of the Eastern Skies (1977)
- Heroes Join Forces (2015 TV)
- Heroes for Sale (1933)
- The Heroes of Telemark (1965)
- Heroes of the West: (1932 & 1963)
- Heroic Sons and Daughters (1964)
- The Heroic Trio (1993)
- Herr Meets Hare (1945)
- Herr Puntila and His Servant Matti: (1960 & 1979)
- Herrens Veje (2017)
- Hers to Hold (1943)
- Herself (2020)
- Hershey (TBD)
- Herstory (2018)

==== Hes–Hey ====
- The Hes Case (1982)
- Hesar (1983)
- Hesburgh (2018)
- Hesher (2010)
- Hesitation Wound (2023)
- The Hessen Affair (2009)
- The Hessian Renegades (1909)
- Hester Street (1975)
- Het Feest van Tante Rita (2022)
- Het Woeden der Gehele Wereld (2006)
- Hetman (2015)
- Heung-boo: The Revolutionist (2018)
- Hex: (1973 & 2015)
- The Hexecutioners (2015)
- Hexed: (1993 & 2026)
- The Hexer (2001)
- Hexing a Hurricane (2006)
- Hey Amigo! A Toast to Your Death (1970)
- Hey Arnold!: The Jungle Movie (2017 TV)
- Hey Arnold!: The Movie (2002)
- Hey Babe!: (1983 & 1999)
- Hey Bro (2015)
- Hey DJ (2003)
- Hey Good Lookin' (1982)
- Hey Good Looking! (2006)
- Hey, Happy! (2001)
- Hey, Hey, It's Esther Blueburger (2008)
- Hey, I'm Alive (1975) (TV)
- Hey Joe (2024)
- Hey Jude (2018)
- Hey Kameeni (2023)
- Hey, Let's Twist! (1961)
- Hey Monster, Hands Off My City (2017)
- Hey, Pop! (1932)
- Hey Ram (2000)
- Hey, Rookie (1944)
- Hey Rube! (1928)
- Hey Sarasu (2016)
- Hey Sinamika (2022)
- Hey, Stop Stabbing Me! (2003)
- Hey There! (1918)
- Hey There, It's Yogi Bear! (1964)
- Hey You (2022)
- The Heyday of the Insensitive Bastards (2015)
- The Heyde-Sawade Affair (1963 TV)
- Heyy Babyy (2007)

=== Hi ===
- Hi, Beautiful (1944)
- Hi, Buddy (1943)
- Hi Cousin! (1996)
- Hi! Dharma! (2001)
- Hi! Dharma 2: Showdown in Seoul (2004)
- Hi Diddle Diddle (1943)
- Hi, Fidelity (2011)
- Hi Gang! (1941)
- Hi I'm Tony (2014)
- Hi, Mom (2021)
- Hi, Mom! (1970)
- Hi, Neighbor (1942)
- Hi Nellie! (1934)
- Hi no Tori (1978)
- Hi'ya, Chum (1943)
- Hi'ya, Sailor (1943)
- Hi-De-Ho (1947)
- Hi-Ho Mistahey! (2013)
- Hi-Jacked (1950)
- Hi-Life (1998)
- The Hi-Line (1999)
- The Hi-Lo Country (1999)
- Hi-Riders (1978)
- Hi-Rise Wise Guys (1970)
- Hi-Tops (1985)
- Hi-Yo Silver (1940)
- Hi'-Neighbor! (1934)

==== Hia–Hii ====
- Hiawatha: (1909, 1913 & 1952)
- Hiawatha, the Messiah of the Ojibway (1903)
- Hiawatha's Rabbit Hunt (1941)
- Hibakusha (2012)
- Hibari no Sākasu Kanashiki Kobato (1952)
- Hibi Rock (2014)
- Hick (2011)
- Hidalgo (2004)
- Hidden: (2009 & 2015)
- The Hidden (1987)
- The Hidden II (1993)
- Hidden Agenda: (1990 & 2001)
- The Hidden Blade (2004)
- Hidden City (1987)
- The Hidden City (2018)
- The Hidden Face (2011)
- Hidden Figures (2016)
- The Hidden Fortress (1958)
- Hidden Fuhrer: Debating the Enigma of Hitler's Sexuality (2004)
- Hidden Guns (1956)
- Hidden Kisses (2016) (TV)
- A Hidden Life: (2001 & 2019)
- Hide and Seek (2005)
- Hide-Out (1934)
- Hideaway (1995)
- Hideous Kinky (1998)
- The Hideous Sun Demon (1958)
- Hiding Out (1987)
- Hieronymus Bosch, Touched by the Devil (2015)
- High Anxiety (1977)
- High Art (1998)
- High Crimes (2002)
- High Desert Kill (1989) (TV)
- High Diving Hare (1949)
- High Fidelity (2000)
- High Freakquency (1998)
- High Heat (2022)
- High Heels and Low Lifes (2001)
- High Hopes (1988)
- High Kick Angels (2014)
- High Lane (2009)
- High&Low The Movie (2016)
- High and Low (1963)
- The High and the Mighty (1954)
- High Noon: (1952, 2009 & 2013)
- High Noon, Part II: The Return of Will Kane (1980 TV)
- The High Note (2020)
- High Plains Drifter (1973)
- High Road to China (1983)
- High Roller: The Stu Ungar Story (2003)
- High School: (1940, 1954, 1968 & 2010)
- High School Confidential (1958)
- High School High (1996)
- High School Musical series:
  - High School Musical (2006) (TV)
  - High School Musical 2 (2007) (TV)
  - High School Musical 3: Senior Year (2008)
- High Schools (1984)
- High Sierra (1941)
- High Society: (1924, 1955, 1956 & 2014)
- High Spirits (1988)
- High Tension (1936 & 2003)
- High Tide: (1947 & 1987)
- High Time (1960)
- High Treason: (1929 British, 1929 German & 1951)
- High Velocity (1976)
- High Voltage: (1929, 1981 & 1997)
- High Wall (1947)
- A High Wind in Jamaica (1965)
- High-Rise (2015)
- Highball (1997)
- Higher Ground (2011)
- Higher Learning (1995)
- Highest 2 Lowest (2025)
- Highlander series:
  - Highlander (1986)
  - Highlander II: The Quickening (1991)
  - Highlander III: The Sorcerer (1994)
  - Highlander: Endgame (2000)
  - Highlander: The Search for Vengeance (2007)
  - Highlander: The Source (2007)
- Highway: (2002 & 2014)
- Highway 301 (1950)
- Highway 61 (1991)
- Highway Dragnet (1954)
- Highway to Hell (1992)
- Highway Patrolman (1991)
- The Highwayman (1951)
- Highwaymen (2004)
- The Highwaymen (2019)
- Hihintayin Kita sa Langit (1991)
- Hiiy Edhenee (2001)

==== Hij–Hiy ====
- Hijacking Catastrophe: 9/11, Fear & the Selling of American Empire (2004)
- Hilary and Jackie (1998)
- Hilde Warren und der Tod (1917)
- Hiljaisuus (2011)
- The Hill (1965)
- Hill of Freedom (2014)
- A Hill in Korea (1956)
- Hillary (2020)
- Hillary's America: The Secret History of the Democratic Party (2016)
- Hillbilly Elegy (2020)
- Hillbilly Hare (1950)
- The Hills Have Eyes series:
  - The Hills Have Eyes: (1977 & 2006)
  - The Hills Have Eyes 2 (2007)
  - The Hills Have Eyes Part II (1985)
- The Hills Run Red: (1966 & 2009)
- Hillside Cannibals (2006)
- Him: (1974 & 2025)
- Himalaya (1999)
- Himalaya: Ladder to Paradise (2015)
- Himitsu (1999)
- Hind Under Siege (2025)
- The Hindenburg (1975)
- Hindenburg Disaster Newsreel Footage (1937)
- Hindi Vindi (2025)
- Hinterland: (1998, 2015 & 2021)
- Hintertreppe (1921)
- The Hippopotamus (2017)
- The Hired Hand (1971)
- Hired! (1940)
- The Hireling (1973)
- Hiroshima: (1953 & 1995)
- Hiroshima Mon Amour (1959)
- Hiruko the Goblin (1991)
- Hirunaka no Ryūsei (2017)
- Hirune Hime: Shiranai Watashi no Monogatari (2017)
- His Girl Friday (1940)
- His House (2020)
- His House in Order: (1920 & 1928)
- His Kind of Woman (1951)
- His Last Gift (2008)
- His Majesty O'Keefe (1954)
- His Majesty, the Scarecrow of Oz (1914)
- His Motorbike, Her Island (1986)
- His New Profession (1914)
- Histoires extraordinaires (1968)
- The History Boys (2006)
- History Is Made at Night (1937)
- History of Postwar Japan as Told by a Bar Hostess (1970)
- A History of Violence (2005)
- History of the World, Part I (1981)
- The Hit (1984)
- Hit the Deck: (1930 & 1955)
- Hit the Ice (1943)
- Hit Man (2023)
- Hit the Road: (1941 & 2021)
- Hit and Run: (1924, 1957, 2009 & 2012)
- Hitch (2005)
- Hitch Hike Lady (1935)
- The Hitch-Hiker (1953)
- Hitchcock (2012)
- Hitchcock/Truffaut (2015)
- The Hitcher: (1986 & 2007)
- The Hitcher II: I've Been Waiting (2003)
- The Hitchhiker's Guide to the Galaxy (2005)
- Hitler: (1962, 1996, 1997 & 1998)
- Hitler – Beast of Berlin (1939)
- Hitler: A Film from Germany (1977)
- Hitler: The Last Ten Days (1973)
- Hitler: The Rise of Evil (2003) (TV)
- Hitler's British Girl (2007) (TV)
- Hitler's Reign of Terror (1934)
- Hitman: (1997, 1998, 2007 & 2014)
- Hitman 2 (2025)
- Hitman: Agent 47 (2015)
- Hitman: Agent Jun (2020)
- Hitman Hart: Wrestling with Shadows (1998)
- The Hitman's Bodyguard (2017)
- Hitman's Wife's Bodyguard (2021)
- Hive (2021 & 2026)
- The Hive: (2008 TV & 2014)
- Hives (2012)
- Hiya (2016)
- Hiya Diya Niya (2000)
- Hiyy Halaaku (2000)
- Hiyy Rohvaanulaa (2009)
- Hiyy Vindhaa Nulaa (2011)
- Hiyy Yaara Dheefa (2011)

=== Hj–Hn ===
- Hjärtan som mötas (1914)
- Hjem går vi ikke (1955)
- Hlemmur (2002)
- Hmone Shwe Yee (1970)
- Hna Pin Lain Tae Yee Sar Sar (2012)
- Hna Yauk Htae Nay Chin Tal (1962)
- Hna Yauk Ta Eain Met (2000)
- Hnin Pyauk Tae Nway (1967)

=== Ho ===
- Ho! (1968)
- Ho Ho Ho (2009)
- Ho Mann Jahaan (2015)
- Ho voglia di te (2007)

==== Hoa–Hok ====
- Hoa-Binh (1970)
- Hoard (2023)
- The Hoard (2018)
- Hoarded Assets (1918)
- Hoax (2019)
- A Hoax (1936)
- The Hoax (1972)
- The Hoax (2007)
- The Hoaxters (1952)
- Hobal (2024)
- The Hobart Shakespeareans (2005 TV)
- The Hobbit: (1967 short, 1977 & 1985)
- The Hobbit series:
  - The Hobbit: An Unexpected Journey (2012)
  - The Hobbit: The Desolation of Smaug (2013)
  - The Hobbit: The Battle of the Five Armies (2014)
- Hobbs in a Hurry (1918)
- Hobbs & Shaw (2019)
- The Hobgoblin (1924)
- Hobgoblins (1988)
- Hobgoblins 2 (2009)
- The Hobo (1917)
- Hobo Bobo (1947)
- Hobo with a Shotgun (2011)
- A Hobo's Christmas (1987 TV)
- Hobson's Choice (1920)
- Hobson's Choice (1931)
- Hobson's Choice (1954)
- Hochelaga (2000)
- Hochheta Ki (2008)
- Hochmut kommt vor dem Knall (1960)
- The Hockey Champ (1939)
- Hockey Homicide (1945)
- Hockey Night (1984) (TV)
- The Hockey Players (1965)
- Hockeyland (2022)
- Hocus Focus (2024)
- Hocus Pocus (1993)
- Hocus Pocus 2 (2022)
- Hocus Pocus Alfie Atkins (2013)
- Hocuspocus (1930)
- Hocuspocus (1953)
- Hocuspocus (1966)
- Hodet over vannet (1993)
- Hoe overleef ik mezelf? (2008)
- Hoedown (1950)
- Hoffa (1992)
- Hoffman (1970)
- Hog Wild (1930)
- Hog Wild (1980)
- Hogan's Alley (1925)
- Hogan's Romance Upset (1915)
- Hogar, dulce hogar (1941)
- Hogaya Dimaagh Ka Dahi (2015)
- Hogi Pyaar Ki Jeet (1999)
- Hogtown (2015)
- Hogtown: The Politics of Policing (2005)
- Hogwood: A Modern Horror Story (2020)
- Hoi Polloi (1935)
- Hoichoi: The Ruckus (2013)
- Hoichoi Unlimited (2018)
- Hoje (2011)
- Hok Kolorob (2026)
- Hokum (2026)
- Hokuriku Proxy War (1977)
- Hokus Pokus (1949)

==== Hol ====
- Hola Venky! (2014)
- The Holcroft Covenant (1985)
- Hold Back (2012)
- Hold Back the Dawn (1941)
- Hold Back the Night (1956)
- Hold Back Tomorrow (1955)
- Hold the Dark (2018)
- Hold 'Em Jail (1932)
- Hold 'Em Yale: (1928 & 1935)
- Hold'em (2014)
- Hold Everything (1930)
- Hold the Lion, Please (1942)
- Hold Me Close (2024)
- Hold Me Down (2017)
- Hold Me, Thrill Me, Kiss Me (1992)
- Hold Me Tight: (1933, 2010 & 2021)
- Hold Me While I'm Naked (1966)
- Hold My Hand (1938)
- Hold My Heart (2002)
- Hold That Ghost (1941)
- Hold You Tight (1998)
- Hold Your Fire (2021)
- The Holdovers (2023)
- Hold-up (2020)
- Hold-Up: (1974, 1985 & 2000)
- Hold-Up! (2012)
- Holding the Man (2015)
- The Hole: (1957, 1960, 1962, 1997, 1998, 2001 & 2009)
- The Hole in the Ground (2019)
- A Hole in the Head (1959)
- A Hole in My Heart (2004)
- A Hole of My Own Making (1955)
- A Hole in the Wall: (1930, 1950 & 1982)
- The Hole in the Wall: (1921 & 1929)
- Holes (2003)
- The Holes (1974)
- Holidate (2020)
- Holiday: (1930 & 1938)
- The Holiday (2006)
- Holiday Affair (1949)
- Holiday Hell (2019)
- Holiday for Henrietta (1952)
- Holiday Inn (1942)
- Holiday in the Sun (2001)
- Holidays (2016)
- The Hollars (2016)
- Hollow: (2011 & 2014)
- Hollow Man (2000)
- Hollow Man 2 (2006)
- Hollow Triumph (1948)
- Holly Hobbie and Friends: Surprise Party (2006)
- The Holly and the Ivy (1952)
- Hollywood or Bust (1956)
- Hollywood Canteen (1944)
- Hollywood Chainsaw Hookers (1988)
- Hollywood Ending (2002)
- Hollywood Heartbreakers (1985)
- Hollywood Homicide (2003)
- The Hollywood Knights (1980)
- The Hollywood Revue of 1929 (1929)
- Hollywood Shuffle (1987)
- Hollywood Stargirl (2022)
- Hollywoodland (2006)
- Holmes & Watson (2018)
- Hols: Prince of the Sun (1968)
- Holy Ghost (2014)
- Holy Ghost People: (1967 & 2013)
- Holy Man (1998)
- Holy Motors (2012)
- The Holy Mountain: (1926 & 1973)
- Holy Rollers (2010)
- Holy Smoke! (1999)
- Holy Spider (2022)

==== Hom ====
- Homage (1995)
- Homage to Chagall: The Colours of Love (1977)
- Homage at Siesta Time (1962)
- Homam (2008)
- Homayoun (2019)
- Hombre (1967)
- Hombres de esta tierra (1922)
- Home: (1915, 2003 TV, 2006, 2008 American, 2008 Swiss, 2009, 2011, 2012, 2013, 2015, 2016 American, 2016 Belgian, 2016 British-Kosovan, 2020, 2021 & 2023)
- The Home (2025)
- Home Again: (2012, 2017 & 2022)
- Home Alone series:
  - Home Alone (1990)
  - Home Alone 2: Lost in New York (1992)
  - Home Alone 3 (1997)
  - Home Alone 4: Taking Back the House (2002) (TV)
  - Home Alone: The Holiday Heist (2012) (TV)
  - Home Sweet Home Alone (2021)
- Home from Babylon (1941)
- Home Before Dark (1958)
- Home Before Midnight (1979)
- Home Beyond the Sun (2004)
- Home of the Brave: (1986, 2004 & 2006)
- Home Care (2015)
- Home Coming: (2006 & 2022)
- Home Cooking (1924)
- Home Cured (1926)
- Home Education (2023)
- A Home at the End of the World (2004)
- Home Folks (1912)
- Home Free (2024)
- Home Fries (1998)
- Home Front (2020)
- Home of the Giants (2006)
- Home Guards (2015)
- Home from the Hill (1960)
- Home for the Holidays: (1972 & 1995)
- Home from Home: (1939 & 2013)
- Home Invasion (2016)
- Home Is the Hero (1959)
- Home Is Somewhere Else (2022)
- Home Is Where the Hart Is (1987)
- Home, James: (1928 & 2013)
- Home Made: (1927 & 2017)
- Home Made Mince Pie (1910)
- Home Minister (2022)
- Home Movie: (2008 & 2016)
- Home Movies (1979)
- Home Page (1999)
- Home Port (1943)
- Home on the Range: (1935, 1946 & 2004)
- A Home on the Range (2002)
- Home Room (2003)
- Home Run (2013)
- Home Run Showdown (2012)
- Home Sic Home (1995)
- Home Sick (2007)
- Home Struck (1927)
- Home Stuff (1921)
- Home Sweet Hell (2015)
- Home, Sweet Home: (1914 & 1933)
- Home Team: (1998 & 2022)
- Home, Tweet Home (1950)
- Home is Where the Killer Is (2019)
- Home-Keeping Hearts (1921)
- Homebodies (1974)
- Homeboy (1988)
- Homecoming: (1928, 1941, 1948, 1996 TV, 2009 & 2021)
- The Homecoming (1973)
- The Homecoming of Odysseus: (1918 & 1922)
- Homefront (2013)
- Homegrown (1998)
- Homeland (2014)
- Homeland: Iraq Year Zero (2015)
- The Homeless (1974)
- The Homeless Student (2008)
- Homerun (2003)
- The Homesman (2014)
- Homestead (2024)
- Homeward Bound: The Incredible Journey (1993)
- Homeward Bound II: Lost in San Francisco (1996)
- Homicidal (1961)
- Homicide: (1949 & 1991)
- Homicide: The Movie (2000) (TV)
- L'Homme du large (1920)
- L'Homme idéal (1997)
- L'Homme qui vendit son âme au diable (1921)
- Homo Erectus (2007)
- Homo Sapiens (2016)
- Homo Sapiens 1900 (1998)
- Homotopia (2007)
- Homunculus (1916)

==== Hon ====
- Honayn's Shoe (2009)
- Hondisi Bareyiri (2023)
- Hondo (1954)
- Hondros (2017)
- Honest (2000)
- Honest Candidate (2020)
- Honest Candidate 2 (2022)
- Honest Hutch (1920)
- An Honest Liar (2014)
- Honest Love and True (1938)
- Honest Man: The Life of R. Budd Dwyer (2010)
- Honest Raj (1994)
- Honest Thief (2020)
- Honestly, I'm Fine (2026)
- Honesty – The Best Policy (1926)
- Honesty and Glory (1951)
- Honey: (1930, 1981, 2010 & 2026)
- Honey series:
  - Honey (2003)
  - Honey 2 (2011)
  - Honey 3: Dare to Dance (2016)
- Honey Bee (2018)
- Honey Bee series:
  - Honey Bee (2013)
  - Honey Bee 2: Celebrations (2017)
  - Honey Bee 2.5 (2017)
- Honey Boy (2019)
- Honey Bunch (2025)
- Honey Bunny (2026)
- Honey Cigar (2020)
- Honey Don't! (2025)
- Honey Harvester (1949)
- Honey Night (2015)
- Honey, I Shrunk the Kids series:
  - Honey, I Shrunk the Kids (1989)
  - Honey, I Blew Up the Kid (1992)
  - Honey, I Shrunk the Audience (1994)
  - Honey, We Shrunk Ourselves (1997)
- Honey, I'm in Love (2008)
- Honey Money (2023)
- Honey Sweet (2023)
- Honey's Money (1962)
- Honeybaby, Honeybaby (1974)
- Honeycomb: (1969 & 2022)
- Honeydew (2020)
- Honeydripper (2007)
- Honeygiver Among the Dogs (2016)
- Honeyglue (2016)
- Honeyjoon (2025)
- Honeyland (1935)
- Honeyland (2019)
- Honeymoon: (1928 American, 1928 German, 1941, 1947, 1956, 1959, 1973, 1974, 1985, 2013 & 2014)
- Honeymoon Hotel: (1934 & 1964)
- The Honeymoon Killers (1970)
- Honeymoon in Vegas (1992)
- The Honeymooners (2005)
- Honeysuckle Rose (1980)
- The Honeytrap (2002)
- Honig im Kopf (2014)
- Honk for Jesus. Save Your Soul. (2022)
- Honky Tonk Freeway (1981)
- Honnōji Hotel (2017)
- Honolulu (1936)
- Honor of the Knights (2006)
- The Honorary Consul (1983)

==== Hoo ====
- Hoo (2010)
- Hoo Anthiya Uhoo Anthiya (2001)
- Hood 2 Hood: The Blockumentary (2008)
- Hood of Horror (2006)
- Hood of the Living Dead (2008)
- Hoodlum (1997)
- Hoodlum Empire (1952)
- The Hoodlum Priest (1961)
- The Hoodlum Saint (1946)
- The Hoodlum Soldier (1965)
- Hoodlum & Son (2003)
- Hoodman Blind (1923)
- Hoodoo Ann (1916)
- Hoodwink (1981)
- Hoodwinked! (2005)
- Hoodwinked Too! Hood vs. Evil (2011)
- A Hoof Here, a Hoof There (1989)
- Hoofs and Goofs (1957)
- Hook (1991)
- Hook a Crook (1955)
- Hook and Ladder (1924)
- Hook and Ladder (1932)
- Hook, Line and Sinker (1930)
- Hook, Line & Sinker (1969)
- Hook, Line and Stinker (1958)
- Hook, Lion and Sinker (1950)
- Hooked (2008)
- Hooked on the Game (2009)
- Hooked Up (2013)
- Hooked on You (2007)
- Hookers on Davie (1984)
- Hooking Up (2020)
- Hooligan Sparrow (2016)
- Hoon Tari Heer (2022)
- Hoop Dreams (1994)
- Hoop-La (1933)
- Hooper (1978)
- The Hooping Life (2010)
- Hooray for the Blue Hussars (1970)
- Hooray, It's a Boy! (1931)
- Hooray, It's a Boy! (1953)
- Hooray for Love (1935)
- The Hoose-Gow (1929)
- Hoosier Holiday (1943)
- A Hoosier Romance (1918)
- Hoosier Schoolboy (1937)
- The Hoosier Schoolmaster (1924)
- The Hoosier Schoolmaster (1935)
- Hoosiers (1986)
- Hoot (2006)
- Hoot Mon! (1919)
- Hoots Mon! (1940)
- Hoover (2000)
- Hooves (2025)
- Hoovu Hannu (1993)
- Hoovu Mullu (1968)

==== Hop ====
- Hop (2011)
- Hop-Along Cassidy (1935)
- Hop, the Bellhop (1919)
- Hop, the Devil's Brew (1916)
- Hop and Go (1943)
- Hop Harrigan (1946)
- Hop to It! (1925)
- Hop, Look and Listen (1948)
- Hop-o'-My-Truth (2011)
- Hopalong Casualty (1960)
- Hope (1997) (TV)
- Hope (2006)
- Hope (2007)
- Hope (2011)
- Hope (2013)
- Hope (2014)
- Hope (2019)
- Hope (2022)
- Hope (2026)
- The Hope (1920)
- Hope Aur Hum (2018)
- The Hope Chest (1918)
- The Hope Diamond Mystery (1921)
- The Hope Division (1987) (TV)
- Hope Floats (1998)
- Hope Frozen (2019)
- Hope Gap (2019)
- Hope and Glory (1987)
- Hope and a Little Sugar (2006)
- Hope Lost (2015)
- Hope and Pain (1988)
- Hope Ranch (2002)
- Hope Springs (2003)
- Hope Springs (2012)
- Hope Springs Eternal (2018)
- Hopeless (2000)
- Hopeless (2023)
- A Hopeless Case (1939)
- Hopelessly Devout (2019)
- Hopelessly Lost (1973)
- Hopes (1941)
- The Hopes of Blind Alley (1914)
- The Hopes & Dreams of Gazza Snell (2010)
- Hoppers (2026)
- Hoppet (2007)
- Hopscotch (1980)

==== Hor ====
- Horatio's Drive: America's First Road Trip (2003)
- The Horde (2012)
- Horizon (1932)
- Horizon (1971)
- Horizon (1989)
- Horizon (2018)
- Horizon: An American Saga series:
  - Horizon: An American Saga – Chapter 1 (2024)
  - Horizon: An American Saga – Chapter 2 (2024)
- Horizon Line (2020)
- The Horn Blows at Midnight (1945)
- Horn 'Ok' Pleassss (2009)
- Horn of Plenty (2008)
- Hornet's Nest (1923)
- Horns (2013)
- Horns and Halos (2002)
- Horrible Bosses (2011)
- Horrible Bosses 2 (2014)
- Horrible Histories: The Movie – Rotten Romans (2019)
- A Horrible Way to Die (2010)
- Horrid Henry: The Movie (2011)
- Horrific (2000)
- Horror (2002)
- The Horror Crowd (2020)
- Horror Express (1973)
- Horror Hotel (1960)
- Horror Noire: A History of Black Horror (2019)
- The Horror of Party Beach (1964)
- Horror of the Zombies (1976)
- Horrors of the Black Museum (1959)
- Horrors of Malformed Men (1969)
- Horse Feathers (1932)
- Horse Girl (2020)
- Horse Money (2014)
- The Horse Soldiers (1959)
- The Horse Thief (1986)
- The Horse Whisperer (1998)
- The Horse's Mouth (1958)
- Horsemen (2009)
- Horsey (1997)
- Horton Hears a Who! (2008)

==== Hos ====
- Hoshi no Furumachi (2011)
- Hoshi o Katta Hi (2006)
- Hoshi Mamoru Inu (2011)
- Hosilu Mettida Hennu (1976)
- Hospital (1970) (TV)
- The Hospital (1971)
- The Hospital (2013)
- Hospital Massacre (1982)
- Hospital of the Transfiguration (1979)
- Hospitals Don't Burn Down! (1978)
- Hospitals: The White Mafia (1973)
- Host (2020)
- The Host (2006)
- The Host (2013)
- The Host (2020)
- Hostage (1974)
- Hostage (1983)
- Hostage (2005)
- The Hostage (1917)
- The Hostage (1956)
- The Hostage (1967)
- The Hostage (2006)
- Hostage for a Day (1994) (TV)
- The Hostage of Europe (1989)
- The Hostage Heart (1977) (TV)
- Hostage: Missing Celebrity (2021)
- Hostage of Time (1994)
- The Hostage Tower (1980) (TV)
- Hostages (1943)
- Hostages (1992) (TV)
- Hostages (2017)
- Hostages (2025)
- The Hostages (1973)
- The Hostages (1975)
- The Hostages (1997) (TV)
- Hostages in the Barrio (1987)
- Hostel (2011)
- Hostel (2013)
- Hostel (2021)
- Hostel (2022)
- Hostel series:
  - Hostel (2005)
  - Hostel: Part II (2007)
  - Hostel: Part III (2011)
- Hostel Hudugaru Bekagiddare (2023)
- Hostel Returns (2015)
- Hostile (2021)
- Hostile Advances (1996) (TV)
- Hostile Country (1950)
- Hostile Dimensions (2023)
- Hostile Guns (1967)
- Hostile Makeover (2009) (TV)
- Hostile Takeover (2001)
- Hostile Waters (1997) (TV)
- Hostile Whirlwinds (1953)
- Hostile Witness (1968)
- Hostiles (2017)
- Hosts (2020)

==== Hot ====
- Hot Air (2019)
- Hot Biskits (1931)
- Hot Blood Band (2015)
- Hot Blooded (2022)
- Hot Boyz (2000)
- Hot Bread (2018)
- Hot Car Girl (1958)
- Hot Cargo (1946)
- Hot Cars (1956)
- The Hot Chick (2002)
- Hot Chili (1985)
- Hot Coffee (2011)
- Hot, Cool, & Vicious (1976)
- Hot Cross Bunny (1948)
- Hot Cross Buns (2011)
- Hot Curves (1930)
- Hot Dog (1930)
- Hot Dog (2018)
- Hot Dog...The Movie (1984)
- Hot Dogs (1980)
- Hot Dogs for Gauguin (1972)
- Hot Enough for June (1964)
- Hot Fields (1949)
- Hot Flash (2019)
- Hot Flash Havoc (2012)
- Hot Frosty (2024)
- Hot Frustrations (1965)
- Hot Fuzz (2007)
- Hot Gimmick: Girl Meets Boy (2019)
- Hot Girls Wanted (2015)
- Hot Heels (1928)
- Hot Heir (1984)
- Hot Hot Hot (2011)
- Hot Ice (1952)
- Hot Ice (1955)
- Hot Ice (1987)
- Hot Lead (1951)
- Hot Lead and Cold Feet (1978)
- Hot Line (1967)
- Hot Milk (2025)
- Hot Millions (1968)
- Hot Money (1936)
- Hot Money (2001) (TV)
- Hot Moves (1984)
- Hot News (1928)
- Hot News (1936)
- Hot News (1953)
- Hot Off the Press (1935)
- Hot Pavements of Cologne (1967)
- Hot Pepper (1933)
- Hot Potato (1976)
- Hot Potato (1979)
- Hot Property (2016)
- Hot Pursuit (1987)
- Hot Pursuit (2015)
- Hot Resort (1985)
- Hot Rhumba (1952)
- Hot Rhythm (1944)
- Hot Road (2014)
- The Hot Rock (1972)
- Hot Rod (1950)
- Hot Rod (1979) (TV)
- Hot Rod (2007)
- Hot Rod Gang (1958)
- Hot Rod Girl (1956)
- Hot Rod Girls Save the World (2008)
- Hot Rod Rumble (1957)
- Hot Rods to Hell (1967)
- Hot Sands (1924)
- Hot Saturday (1932)
- Hot & Saucy Pizza Girls (1978)
- Hot Seat (2022)
- Hot Shots (1956)
- Hot Shots! (1991)
- Hot Shots! Part Deux (1993)
- Hot Snow (1972)
- Hot Spell (1958)
- Hot Spot (2024)
- Hot Spot (2026)
- The Hot Spot (1990)
- Hot Spot 2 Much (2026)
- Hot Spring Ghost (1964)
- Hot Steel (1940)
- Hot Stuff (1912)
- Hot Stuff (1929)
- Hot Stuff (1956)
- Hot Stuff (1971)
- Hot Stuff (1979)
- Hot Summer in Barefoot County (1974)
- Hot Summer in the City (1976)
- Hot Summer Days (2010)
- Hot Summer Night (1957)
- Hot Summer Nights (2017)
- Hot Tamale (2006)
- Hot Target (1985)
- Hot Tip (1935)
- Hot Tomorrows (1977)
- Hot to Trot (1988)
- Hot Tub Time Machine (2010)
- Hot Tub Time Machine 2 (2015)
- Hot War (1998)
- Hot Water (1924)
- Hot Water (1937)
- Hot Water (2026)
- Hot Wheels: World Race (2003)
- Hot Young Bloods (2014)
- Hot-Rod and Reel! (1959)
- Hotal (2014)
- Hotath Neerar Jonnyo (2004)
- Hote Hote Pyar Ho Gaya (1999)
- Hotel (1967)
- Hotel (2001)
- Hotel (2004)
- Hotel Adlon (1955)
- Hotel America (1981)
- Hotel Angel (1974)
- Hotel Artemis (2018)
- Hotel Beautifool (TBD)
- Hotel Belgrade (2020)
- Hotel Berlin (1945)
- Hotel California (2013)
- Hotel Central (1983)
- Hotel Chelsea (2009)
- Hotel Chevalier (2007)
- Hotel Clausewitz (1967)
- Hotel Colonial (1987)
- Hotel Continental (1932)
- The Hotel of the Dead (1921)
- Hotel for Dogs (2009)
- Hotel du Lac (1986) (TV)
- Hotel Mumbai (2019)
- The Hotel New Hampshire (1984)
- Hôtel du Nord (1938)
- Hotel Paradis (1931)
- Hotel Paradiso (1966)
- Hotel by the River (2018)
- Hotel Rwanda (2004)
- Hotel Terminus: The Life and Times of Klaus Barbie (1988)
- Hotel Transylvania series:
  - Hotel Transylvania (2012)
  - Hotel Transylvania 2 (2015)
  - Hotel Transylvania 3: Summer Vacation (2018)
  - Hotel Transylvania: Transformania (2022)
- The Hottest State (2006)
- The Hottie and the Nottie (2008)

==== Hou ====
- Houdini (1953)
- The Hound of the Baskervilles: (1921, 1929, 1932, 1937, 1939, 1959, 1972 TV, 1978, 1981 TV, 1983 TV, 2000 TV & 2002 TV)
- Hounds of Love (2016)
- The Hour of the Furnaces (1968)
- Hour of the Gun (1968)
- Hour of the Wolf (1968)
- The Hours (2002)
- The Hours and Times (1991)
- House: (1977, 1995 & 2008)
- House series:
  - House (1986)
  - House II: The Second Story (1987)
  - House III: The Horror Show (1989)
  - House IV (1992)
- The House: (1975, 1983, 1997, 1999, 2011, 2013, 2017 & 2022)
- House of 1000 Corpses (2003)
- House of 9 (2005)
- The House on 92nd Street (1945)
- The House Across the Bay (1940)
- The House Across the Lake (1954)
- The House Across the Street (1949)
- House Arrest (1996)
- House of Bamboo (1955)
- The House Bunny (2008)
- House of Cards: (1943, 1968 & 1993)
- The House on Carroll Street (1988)
- The House by the Cemetery (1984)
- The House with a Clock in Its Walls (2018)
- House of D (2005)
- House of Dark Shadows (1970)
- House of Darkness: (1948 & 2022)
- The House of Darkness (1913)
- House of the Dead (2003)
- House of the Dead 2 (2006) (TV)
- The House of the Devil: (1896 & 2009)
- House of Dracula (1945)
- The House on the Edge of the Park (1980)
- House at the End of the Street (2012)
- The House of Fear (1945)
- House of Flying Daggers (2004)
- House of Fools (2002)
- House of Frankenstein (1944)
- House of Games (1987)
- The House on Garibaldi Street (1979) (TV)
- The House of Ghosts (1908)
- House of Gucci (2021)
- House on Haunted Hill: (1959 & 1999)
- House on the Hill (2012)
- House of Hummingbird (2018)
- House by the Lake (2017)
- The House I Live In: (1945, 1957 & 2012)
- The House with Laughing Windows (1976)
- House of the Long Shadows (1983)
- The House of the Lost Court (1915)
- The House in the Middle (1954)
- The House of Mirth: (1918, 1981 TV & 2000)
- The House of Molitor (1922)
- House Party series:
  - House Party (1990)
  - House Party 2 (1991)
  - House Party 3 (1994)
  - House Party 4: Down to the Last Minute (2001)
- House of Pleasure: (1952 & 1969)
- House by the River (1950)
- The House of Rothschild (1934)
- The House of Sand (2006)
- House of Sand and Fog (2003)
- The House of the Seven Gables (1940)
- The House on Sorority Row (1982)
- The House of the Spaniard (1936)
- The House of the Spirits (1993)
- House of Strangers (1949)
- House of Terror: (1960 & 1973)
- The House That Dripped Blood (1971)
- The House That Jack Built: (1900, 1967 & 2018)
- The House That Vanished (1973)
- The House That Would Not Die (1970) (TV)
- House of Tolerance (2011)
- House of Usher (1960)
- House of Wax: (1953 & 2005)
- House on Willow Street (2016)
- House of the Witch (2017)
- The House of Yes (1997)
- House! (2000)
- Houseboat (1958)
- Houseboat Horror (1989)
- Housebound (2014)
- Housefull 2 (2012)
- Houseguest (1995)
- Household X (2011)
- Housekeeping (1988)
- The Housemaid: (1960, 2010, 2016 & 2025)
- Housesitter (1992)

==== Hov ====
- Hover (2018)
- Hovering Over the Water (1986)

==== How–Hoz ====
- How About Adolf? (2018)
- How About You (2007)
- How Angels Are Born (1996)
- How to Be a Latin Lover (2017)
- How to Be a Player (1997)
- How to Be Single (2016)
- How to Beat the High Cost of Living (1980)
- How to Build a Better Boy (2014)
- How to Build a Girl (2019)
- How to Deal (2003)
- How to Deter a Robber (2020)
- How Do You Know (2010)
- How to Eat Fried Worms (2006)
- How to Get Ahead in Advertising (1989)
- How Green Was My Valley (1941)
- How the Grinch Stole Christmas: (1966 TV & 2000)
- How High (2001)
- How I Got Into College (1989)
- How I Killed My Father (2001)
- How I Won the War (1967)
- How to Irritate People (1968) (TV)
- How It Ends: (2018 & 2021)
- How Kids Roll (2024)
- How to Kill Your Neighbor's Dog (2000)
- How the Lack of Love Affects Two Men (2006)
- How to Lose Friends & Alienate People (2008)
- How to Lose a Guy in 10 Days (2003)
- How to Make an American Quilt (1995)
- How to Make the Cruelest Month (1998)
- How to Make Gravy (2024)
- How to Make a Monster: (1958 & 2001 TV)
- How to Marry a Millionaire (1953)
- How a Mosquito Operates (1912)
- How Much Wood Would a Woodchuck Chuck (1976)
- How to Murder Your Wife (1965)
- How to Play Baseball (1942)
- How to Please a Woman (2022)
- How to Rob a Bank: (2007, 2024 & 2026)
- How to Save a Marriage and Ruin Your Life (1968)
- How She Move (2008)
- How the Sith Stole Christmas (2002)
- How to Steal a Million (1966)
- How Stella Got Her Groove Back (1998)
- How to Stuff a Wild Bikini (1965)
- How to Succeed in Business Without Really Trying (1967)
- How to Survive a Plague (2012)
- How to Swim: (1942 & 2018)
- How to Talk Australians: The Movie (2026)
- How to Train Your Dragon series:
  - How to Train Your Dragon (2010 & 2025)
  - How to Train Your Dragon 2 (2014)
  - How to Train Your Dragon 3 (2019)
- How the West Was Won (1962)
- How, When and with Whom (1969)
- How's About It (1943)
- How's Chances? (1938)
- How's it going (1976)
- How've You Bean? (1933)
- The Howard Case (1936)
- Howard the Duck (1986)
- Howard Lovecraft and the Frozen Kingdom (2016)
- Howards End (1992)
- The Howards of Virginia (1940)
- Howl (2010)
- The Howl: (1948 & 1970)
- Howl's Moving Castle (2004)
- Howling series:
  - The Howling (1981)
  - Howling II: Your Sister Is a Werewolf (1985)
  - Howling III (1987)
  - Howling IV: The Original Nightmare (1988)
  - Howling V: The Rebirth (1989)
  - Howling VI: The Freaks (1991)
  - The Howling: New Moon Rising (1995)
  - The Howling: Reborn (2011)
- The Howling Wolf (1919)
- A Howling in the Woods (1971 TV)
- The Hows of Us (2018)
- Hoy cumple años mamá (1948)
- Hoy Maharaja (2024)
- Hōzuki-san Chi no Aneki (2014)

=== Hr–Hs ===
- Hrad (1955)
- Hrdina jedné noci (1935)
- Hridayam (2022)
- Hridayam Oru Kshethram (1976)
- Hridayame Sakshi (1977)
- Hridayanath (2012)
- Hridayapoorvam (2025)
- Hridayathil Sookshikkan (2005)
- Hridhayam Paadunnu (1980)
- Hridhayathinte Nirangal (1979)
- Hridoyer Bandhon (2001)
- Hridoyer Kotha (2006)
- Hrudaya Geethe (1989)
- Hrudaya Haadithu (1991)
- Hrudaya Hrudaya (1999)
- Hrudaya Kaleyam (2014)
- Hrudaya Pallavi (1987)
- Hrudaya Sangama (1972)
- Hrudayam Ekkadunnadi (2014)
- Hrudayanjali (2002)
- Hrudayantar (2017)
- Hrudayavantha (2003)
- Hry a sny (1958)
- Hsaung (1966)
- Hsue-shen Tsien (2012)

=== Hu ===
- Hu Dagmar (1939)
- Hu ane Tu (2023)
- Hu-Du-Men (1996)
- Hu-Man (1975)

==== Hua–Hul ====
- Hua Yang De Nian Hua (2000)
- Huacho (2009)
- Hubal (1973)
- Hubba (2024)
- Hubbabali (2006)
- Hubble (2010)
- Hubert's Brain (2001)
- Hubertus Castle: (1934, 1954 & 1973)
- Hubička (1911)
- Hubie Halloween (2020)
- Huccha 2 (2018)
- Huck and Tom (1918)
- Huckleberry Finn: (1920, 1931, 1974 & 1975 TV)
- Hud: (1963 & 1986)
- Huda (1959)
- Huda's Salon (2021)
- Hudson Hawk (1991)
- Huduga Hudugi (2010)
- Hudugaata (2007)
- Hudugaru (2011)
- The Hudsucker Proxy (1994)
- Hue and Cry (1947)
- Huesera: The Bone Woman (2022)
- Huey Tum Ajnabi (2023)
- Huff! It's Too Much (2013)
- Hug! Pretty Cure Futari wa Pretty Cure: All Stars Memories (2018)
- Huge (2010)
- The Hugga Bunch (1985 TV)
- Hugo (2011)
- Hugon, The Mighty (1918)
- Hugs and Kisses (1967)
- Huie's Sermon (1981)
- Huk! (1956)
- Hukkle (2002)
- "Hukkunud Alpinisti" hotell (1979)
- Hula (1927)
- Hula Fulla Dance (2021)
- Hula Girls (2006)
- Hula-La-La (1951)
- Hula Mo, Huli Ko (2002)
- Hulchul: (1951, 1971, 1995, 2004 & 2019)
- Hulda of Holland (1913)
- Huli (2010)
- Huli Hebbuli (1987)
- Huli Hejje (1984)
- Huling Patak ng Dugo (1950)
- Huling Ulan sa Tag-Araw (2021)
- Huliraaya (2017)
- Huliya (1996)
- Huliya Haalina Mevu (1979)
- Hulk (2003)
- Hulk Vs (2008)
- Hulk: Where Monsters Dwell (2016)
- Hullabaloo (1940)
- Hullabaloo Over Georgie and Bonnie's Pictures (1978)
- Hullo Marmaduke (1924)

==== Hum ====
- Hum (1991)
- Hum Aapke Hain Koun..! (1994)
- Hum Badal Gaye (2012)
- Hum Bhi Akele Tum Bhi Akele (2021)
- Hum Bhi Insaan Hain: (1948 & 1989)
- Hum Chaar (2019)
- Hum Dil De Chuke Sanam (1999)
- Hum Do Hamare Do (2021)
- Hum Dono: (1961, 1985 & 1995)
- Hum Dum (2005)
- Hum Ek Hain: (1946 & 2004)
- Hum Farishte Nahin (1988)
- Hum Hai Raahi Car Ke (2013)
- Hum Hain Bemisaal (1994)
- Hum Hain Kamaal Ke (1993)
- Hum Hain Khalnayak (1996)
- Hum Hain Lajawab (1984)
- Hum Hain Rahi Pyar Ke (1993)
- Hum Hindustani (1960)
- Hum Ho Gaye Aapke (2001)
- Hum Intezaar Karenge (1989)
- Hum Kaun Hai? (2004)
- Hum Kisise Kum Naheen (1977)
- Hum Kisise Kum Nahin (2002)
- Hum Log (1951)
- Hum Naujawan (1985)
- Hum Paanch (1980)
- Hum Panchhi Ek Daal Ke (1957)
- Hum Pyar Tumhi Se Kar Baithe (2002)
- Hum Saath-Saath Hain (1999)
- Hum Sab Ullu Hain (2015)
- Hum Sab Ustad Hain (1965)
- Hum Se Badkar Kaun (1981)
- Hum Se Hai Zamana (1983)
- Hum Se Na Takrana (1990)
- Hum Sub Chor Hain: (1973 & 1995)
- Hum Tere Aashiq Hain (1979)
- Hum To Chale Pardes (1988)
- Hum To Mohabbat Karega (2000)
- Hum Tum (2004)
- Hum Tum Aur Ghost (2010)
- Hum Tum Aur Mom (2005)
- Hum Tum Aur Woh: (1938 & 1971)
- Hum Tum Dushman Dushman (2015)
- Hum Tum Pe Marte Hain (1999)
- Hum Tum Shabana (2011)
- Hum Tumhare Hain Sanam (2002)
- Huma Gun Anmogaldi (1942)
- Humain, trop humain (1973)
- Humains (2009)
- Human: (1976 & 2015)
- Human Capital: (2013 & 2019)
- Human Cargo (1936)
- The Human Centipede series:
  - The Human Centipede (First Sequence) (2010)
  - The Human Centipede 2 (Full Sequence) (2011)
  - The Human Centipede 3 (Final Sequence) (2015)
- Human Cobras (1971)
- Human Collateral (1920)
- Human Comedy (2017)
- The Human Condition series:
  - The Human Condition I: No Greater Love (1959)
  - The Human Condition II: Road to Eternity (1959)
  - The Human Condition III: A Soldier's Prayer (1961)
- Human Desire: (1919 & 1954)
- Human Desires (1924)
- Human Driftwood (1916)
- Human Error (2004)
- Human Experiments (1979)
- Human Factors (2021)
- Human Flow (2017)
- Human Flowers of Flesh (2022)
- Human Harvest (2014)
- Human Hearts (1922)
- Human Hibachi (2019)
- Human Hibachi 2: Feast in The Forest (2023)
- Human Highway (1982)
- Human Hounds (1916)
- Human Lost (2019)
- Human Nature: (2001 & 2019)
- Human Remains (1998)
- Human Resources (1999)
- The Human Stain (2003)
- Human Target (1974) (TV)
- Human Targets (1932)
- The Human Tornado (1976)
- Human Touch (2004)
- Human Traffic (2000)
- Human Traces (2017)
- Human Trust (2013)
- The Human Voice (2020)
- Human Wreckage (1923)
- Human Zoo (2009)
- Humanap Ka ng Panget (1991)
- Humanda Ka Mayor!: Bahala Na ang Diyos (1993)
- Humane (2024)
- Humanimal (2009)
- Humanité (1999)
- Humanity (1933)
- Humanity and Paper Balloons (1937)
- Humanity Through the Ages (1908)
- Humanity Unleashed (1920)
- Humanity's End (2009)
- Humanoids from the Deep: (1980 & 1996)
- The Humans (2021)
- Humayun (1945)
- The Humbling (2014)
- Humdrum (1998)
- Humongous (1982)
- Humor Risk (1921)
- Humoresque: (1920 & 1946)
- Humorous Phases of Funny Faces (1906)
- The Humpbacked Horse: (1941 & 1947)
- Humpday (2009)
- Humse Badhkar Kaun (1998)

==== Hun ====
- The Hunchback: (1914 & 1997 TV)
- The Hunchback of Notre Dame: (1911, 1923, 1939, 1956, 1976 TV, 1982 TV, 1986 & 1996)
- The Hunchback of Notre Dame II (2002)
- Hundred Regiments Offensive (2015)
- The Hundred-Year-Old Man Who Climbed Out of the Window and Disappeared (2013)
- Hundreds of Beavers (2022)
- Hung Up (1973)
- Hungama: (1971, 2003 & 2005)
- Hungama 2 (2021)
- Hungama Bombay Ishtyle (1978)
- Hungama in Dubai (2007)
- Hungarian Rhapsody: (1928, 1954 & 1979)
- Hunger: (1966, 1973, 2001, 2008 & 2009)
- The Hunger: (1983 & 1986)
- The Hunger Games series:
  - The Hunger Games (2012)
  - The Hunger Games: Catching Fire (2013)
  - The Hunger Games: Mockingjay – Part 1 (2014)
  - The Hunger Games: Mockingjay – Part 2 (2015)
  - The Hunger Games: The Ballad of Songbirds & Snakes (2023)
  - The Hunger Games: Sunrise on the Reaping (2026)
- Hunger for Love (1968)
- Hungry (2026)
- Hungry Eyes (1918)
- Hungry Ghost Diner (2023)
- Hungry Ghost Ritual (2014)
- Hungry Heart (1987)
- A Hungry Heart (1917)
- The Hungry Heart (1917)
- Hungry Hearts: (1916, 1922 & 2014)
- Hungry Hill (1947)
- Hunk (1987)
- The Hunt: (1963, 1966, 2007, 2012, 2016 & 2020)
- The Hunt for Gollum (2009)
- The Hunt for Red October (1990)
- Hunt for the Wilderpeople (2016)
- The Hunted: (1948, 1995, 2003, 2013 & 2015)
- Hunted: (1952 & 2020)
- Hunter (1973)
- The Hunter: (1980, 2010, 2011 Russian & 2011 Australian)
- Hunter Hunter (2020)
- Hunter × Hunter series:
  - Hunter × Hunter: Phantom Rouge (2013)
  - Hunter × Hunter: The Last Mission (2013)
- The Hunter's Cross (1954)
- Hunterrr (2015)
- Hunters Are for Killing (1970 TV)
- Hunting (1991)
- Hunting Humans (2002)
- The Hunting Party: (1971 & 2007)
- The Hunting of the President (2004)
- The Huntsman: Winter's War (2016)

==== Hur–Hux ====
- Hur många kramar finns det i världen? (2013)
- Huracán Ramírez (1953)
- Huracán Ramírez y la monjita negra (1973)
- Hurdy Gurdy (1929)
- Hurdy-Gurdy Hare (1950)
- Hureemey Inthizaarugaa (2005)
- Hurlevent (1985)
- Hurlyburly (1998)
- Hurra for Andersens! (1966)
- Hurra, die Schule brennt! (1969)
- Hurrah (1998)
- Hurrah! I Live! (1928)
- Hurrah! I'm a Father (1939)
- Hurricane: (1929, 1974 TV, 1979 & 2018)
- The Hurricane: (1937 & 1999)
- Hurricane on the Bayou (2006)
- Hurricane Bianca: From Russia with Hate (2018)
- Hurricane Boy Fuck You Tabarnak! (2023)
- Hurricane in Galveston (1913)
- Hurricane Heist (2018)
- Hurricane Hutch (1921)
- Hurricane Hutch in Many Adventures (1924)
- Hurricane at Pilgrim Hill (1950) (TV)
- Hurricane Smith: (1941, 1952 & 1992)
- Hurricane Streets (1997)
- Hurricane in the Tropics (1939)
- Hurry, Charlie, Hurry (1941)
- Hurry Om Hurry (2023)
- Hurry... the Schoolgirls Are Coming (1975)
- Hurry Sundown (1967)
- Hurry Up, or I'll Be 30 (1973)
- Hurry Up Tomorrow (2025)
- The Hurt Locker (2008)
- The Husband (2013)
- Husbands (1970)
- Husbands and Wives (1992)
- Hush: (1998, 2008, 2013 & 2016)
- Hush...Hush, Sweet Charlotte (1964)
- Husk (2010)
- Hussar Ballad (1962)
- Hustle: (1975, 2004 TV & 2022)
- The Hustle (2019)
- Hustle & Flow (2005)
- The Hustler: (1920 & 1961)
- Hustlers (2019)
- Hutsulka Ksenya (2019)
- Huxley on Huxley (2009)

=== Hv–Hy ===
- Hvad vil De ha'? (1956)
- Hvězda zvaná Pelyněk (1964)
- Hvis lille pige er du? (1963)
- Hwang Jin Yi (2007)
- Hwasango (2001)
- Hwayi: A Monster Boy (2013)
- Hwerow Hweg (2002)
- Hybrid: (1997 & 2007)
- The Hybrid (2014)
- Hybrids: (2015 & 2017)
- Hyde and Go Tweet (1960)
- Hyde and Hare (1955)
- Hyde Park (1934)
- Hyde Park Corner (1935)
- Hyde Park on Hudson (2012)
- Hyderabad Blues (1998)
- Hyderabad Blues 2 (2004)
- Hyderabad Love Story (2018)
- Hyderabad Nawabs (2006)
- Hyderabad Nawabs 2 (2019)
- Hydra (2009 TV)
- Hyena (2014)
- The Hyena of London (1964)
- Hyena Road (2015)
- Hyenas: (1992 & 2011)
- Hyménée (1947)
- The Hymn of Leuthen (1933)
- Hymn of the Nations (1944)
- Hymn to a Tired Man (1968)
- Hyouka: Forbidden Secrets (2017)
- Hype! (1996)
- Hyper: (2016 & 2018)
- Hyper Sapien: People from Another Star (1986)
- The Hyperboloid of Engineer Garin (1965)
- Hyperspace (1984)
- The Hyperwomen (2012)
- Hypnos (2004)
- Hypnosis (2020)
- Hypnotic: (2021 & 2023)
- The Hypnotic Eye (1960)
- Hypnotic Hick (1953)
- The Hypnotist: (1940, 1957 & 2012)
- Hypnotist's Revenge (1908)
- A Hypnotist at Work (1897)
- Hypnotized: (1910 & 1932)
- Hypocrite (1949)
- Hypocrites (1915)
- The Hypocrites: (1916, 1923 & 1965)
- Hypothermia (2012)
- The Hypothesis of the Stolen Painting (1978)
- Hyppolit, the Butler (1931)
- Hysteria: (1965, 1997, 2011 & 2025)
- Hysterical (1983)
- Hysterical Blindness (2002 TV)
- Hysterical History (1953)
- Hysterical Psycho (2009)

Previous: List of films: G Next: List of films: I

== See also ==
- Lists of films
- Lists of actors
- List of film and television directors
- List of documentary films
- List of film production companies
