= Hocus Focus =

Hocus Focus may refer to:

- "Hocus Focus", the twenty-fourth episode of season four of the American sitcom series Will & Grace
- Hocus Focus (TV series), a 1979 American television series on Nickelodeon
- Hocus Focus Films, an Israeli film studio
- Hocus-Focus, a comics page feature begun by Harold Kaufmann and continued by Henry Boltinoff
- Hocus Focus (film), a Hindi-language drama film

== See also ==
- Hocus Pocus (disambiguation)
