= Healers for All Reasons =

Healers For All Reasons
- Directed by: Vijay S. Jodha
- Written by: Vijay S. Jodha
- Produced by: PSBT & Prasar Bharati
- Starring: Karimbhai Sumara, Rehmat Khan Solanki, Anil Kumar Gupta
- Cinematography: Sanjay Agrawal
- Edited by: Vijay S. Jodha
- Distributed by: Syncline Films Pvt. Ltd.
- Release date: 23 February 2005 (India)
- Running time: 28 minutes
- Country: India
- Language: English/Gujarati/Hindi

Healers For All Reasons (2005) is a 28-minute documentary directed by Vijay S. Jodha. It looks at two traditional Indian village healers whose lives and work embody altruism, tolerance and sustainability. The documentary was made in English, Gujarati and Hindi.

== Content ==
Filmed in the aftermath of 2002 Gujarat violence in which over a thousand people were killed, and mistrust between Muslim and Hindu communities ran high, the film focuses on the work of two Muslim healers who live and work among predominantly Hindu communities. Karimbhai Sumra of Virampur village, Gujarat, uses traditional medicine to heal humans, animals, and even plants. The last category includes producing a variety of herbal pesticides for farmers. Rehmat Khan Solanki of Chur Village, Gujarat, on the other hand, specializes in treating animals and uses traditional medicine and environmentally friendly methods to heal them. Although a Muslim, he is called 'Gopal Bapa' by Hindu villagers for being a benefactor of cattle like Hindu deity Lord Krishna.

The two healers work in places that lack hospitals and modern veterinary services. They are not wealthy but do not demand any fee for their services. They are happy with whatever people give to them in return. Their knowledge of various local plants and their healing properties has been documented and recognized by mainstream scientists. Prof. Anil Kumar Gupta of Indian Institute of Management, Ahmedabad and Executive Vice Chair of the National Innovation Foundation, talks on camera about his association with the two healers and the importance of their work in the context of protection and conservation of indigenous knowledge systems.

== Reception ==
Reviews for the film were positive, with India Today describing it as "a unique documentary on harmony" and that the film was "a testament perhaps to the fact that politics is yet to triumph over brotherhood and compassion." Writing for Down to Earth, Nicki Kindersley said that "the documentary highlights the problem of maintaining a traditional system within modern corporate structures." The Hindu said that the film "brings forth the pluralistic identity of the country in more ways than one."

== See also ==
- Traditional medicine
- Indigenous intellectual property
