= Hollywood Heartbreakers =

American adult film

Hollywood Heartbreakers is a 1985 pornographic film featuring Amber Lynn, Beverly Bliss, Gina Valentino, Nicole West, Traci Lords, Craig Roberts, David Sanders, Greg Rome, Rick Savage, Peter North, Tony Martino and Ron Jeremy.

== Scene Breakdown ==
Scene 1	Amber Lynn, David Sanders
Scene 2	Beverly Bliss, Craig Roberts
Scene 3	Traci Lords, Tony Martino
Scene 4	Nicole West, Traci Lords, Peter North
Scene 5	Gina Valentino, Rick Savage
Scene 6	Amber Lynn, Greg Rome, Ron Jeremy
