= Happy Heroes (TV series) =

- Genre: Science fiction; Comedy; Action
- Developed by: Guangzhou Huang Weiming Animation Design Co., Ltd.
- Directed by: Huang Weiming
- Country of origin: China
- Original language: Mandarin
- No. of seasons: 20
- No. of episodes: 924

Original release
- Network: CCTV 1
- Release: July 2, 2010 – present

Happy Heroes (simplified Chinese: 开心宝贝; traditional Chinese: 開心寶貝; pinyin: Kāixīn bǎobèi) is a Chinese animation series produced by Guangdong Star Creative Animation Co, a company established by Huang WeiMing and his team. The animation tells the story of Happy Superman, Sweetheart Superman, Philandering Superman, Careless Superman, Careful Superman, Galo and Big Big Monster and Little Little Monster who are going to invade the star ball to fight against each other.

== Premise ==
The story takes place in the universe where humans, robots, aliens, and animals live together in a place called "Starsphere". Once, Planet Greyheart sends General Big Monster and Corporal Little Monster to take over the Star Sphere by force. Big and Little Monsters were armed with the ultimate weapon, the five-colored magical jewel, a strange crystal that could give life and intelligence to machines and possessed great power. But while rushing into the atmosphere, the ship malfunctions. Big Big Monster orders Little Little Monster to launch the four Mechanical Stones — red, pink, green, and blue — into the abandoned locomotive, which is drifting through space, before crashing into the Planet of the Stars.

A brilliant mechanic on the planet, Dr. Otaku, inadvertently activates the four stones while repairing the abandoned electrical junk. The four jewels transformed into four Supermen: Happy Superman, Sweetie Superman, Flowery Superman, and Careless Superman. They are taken in and raised by Dr. Geek. They work together to protect the Satellite Planet. While Big Monster and Tiny Monster lurked on the planet, ostensibly maintaining a friendly relationship with the Supermen and the people of the planet, but in fact secretly utilizing the Black Mechanical Stone to create chaos, to seek opportunities for invasion, but have always failed to do so. Later, in the race, the black mechanical stone accidentally fell into the motorcycle, which was repaired and activated by Dr. Otaku, and transformed into a Careful Superman, joining the Superman team of the Otaku family, and the five Supermen finally succeeded in getting together.

Dr. Otaku officially sends the five Supermen to the campus, Superstar Academy, to carry out their campus life. Due to the pressure of livelihood and the need for aggression, Big Monster decided to sneak into the Super Star College as a janitor, and at the same time arranged for Tiny Monster to enter the Super Star College to study and become a classmate with the five Supermen, waiting for the opportunity to steal information. Meanwhile, the Commander of Planet Greyheart instructs Da Da Monster to establish a Monster Academy in the Planet of Stars with the aim of training more monsters to facilitate the invasion of the Planet of Stars.

The last guardian of Planet Adri, Knight Admiral Garo, had been taken in by Commander Greyheart after the destruction of his home planet. After being used by the Commander to attack the Planet, Garo becomes a close friend of Superman Beware and joins the guardians of the Planet in his mansion. Meanwhile, people from other planets are also eyeing the Planet.

== Characters ==
=== Main characters and dubbing ===
- Happy Superman (开心超人) voiced by: Liu Hongyun
- Sweetheart Superman (甜心超人) voiced by: Deng Yuting (in Adventures of Ancient Spirit Star, Zu Qing, Time and Space Defense Battle, and Return of the Hero were added and changed to Deng Shuwen)
- Smart Superman (花心超人) voiced by: Yan Yanzi
- Careless Superman (粗心超人) voiced by: Zu Qing
- Careful Superman (小心超人) voiced by: Liu Hongyun (except by Zu Qing in the first season)
- Kalo (伽罗) voiced by: Deng Yuting (returned to Deng Shuwen in Return of the Hero)
- Dr. Otaku's voice: Deng Yuting (Liu Hongyun was added in Adventures of Ancient Spirit Star, Time and Space Defense, and Return of the Hero was changed to Deng Shuwen)
- Big Big Monster: Gao Quansheng
- Little Little Monster voiced by: Yan Yanzi

=== Minor characters ===
- Zhang Lang
- Akas
- Kai sa
- Multi-minded superman
- Sad superman
- Disgusting Superman
- Bulb Boss
- Sister Taozi
- Television Headteather
- Fen Qi
- Lisa

== Media profile ==
Happy Heroes, as a series, has completed 23 seasons of television animation (including 20 seasons of the main series and three seasons of spin-offs) and three animated films through December 2023, with an additional television animation pending release. Seasons one through seven, nine through fifteen, and eighteen of the Happy Baby television anime have 52 episodes, with 25 episodes in season twenty, 26 episodes in seasons sixteen through seventeen, 27 episodes in season nineteen, and 40 episodes in season eight, usually each of which is 13 minutes long.

=== TV version ===
series	name	Episode	Premiere date
Season 1	Happy Baby	52 episodes	July 2, 2010
Season 2	Happy Baby: Happy Superman	52 episodes	January 15, 2011
Season 3	Happy Baby: Happy Superman Battle	52 episodes	July 16, 2011
Season 4	Happy Baby: Happy Adventure	52 episodes	January 9, 2012
Season 5	Happy Baby: Happy Star Planet	52 episodes	August 4, 2012
Season 6	Happy Baby: The Adventures of Ancient Spirit Star	52 episodes	April 27, 2013
Season 7	Happy Baby: Happy Alliance Battle	52 episodes	January 6, 2014
Season 8	Happy Baby's Fantasy Journey	40 episodes	May 30, 2014
Season 9	Happy Superman Alliance: Time and Space Defense Battle	52 episodes	August 7, 2015
Season 10	Happy Superman League: The Return of the Heroes	52 episodes	July 16, 2016
Season 11	Happy Superman League: Interstellar Crisis	52 episodes	August 22, 2017
Season 12	Happy Superman Alliance: Star Alliance	52 episodes	February 4, 2019
Season 13	Happy Superman Alliance Energy Nuclear Guardian	52 episodes	March 1, 2020
Season 14	Happy Superman Alliance Star Power	52 episodes	October 12, 2020
Season 15	Happy Superman Alliance: The Adventures of the Mechanical Castle	52 episodes	August 2, 2021
Season 16	Happy Superman League: Fantasy Mystery Island	26 episodes	November 19, 2021
Season 17	Happy Superman League: Alien Trek	26 episodes	May 20, 2022
Season 18	Happy Superman Alliance: Adventure in Parallel Time and Space	52 episodes	December 9, 2022
Season 19	Happy Superman League: Brave City 1 - Chess Beast Legend	27 episodes	September 26, 2023
Season 20	Happy Superman League: Brave City 2 - Superman Project	25 episodes	December 20, 2023
Season 21			

TV version derivative works

serial number	name	Episode	Premiere date
1	Funny Star Planet	52 episodes	February 7, 2016
2	Happy Superman Alliance: Magic Laboratory	24 episodes	January 20, 2018
3	Happy Superman League Mystery City	26 episodes	September 27, 2018

== Media details ==
=== TV version ===
- Happy Baby (Season 1)

In the universe, there is a place where human beings, robots and aliens live together, called "Starsphere". One day, the Cosmic Development Company on the planet of Grey Heart sent two men, General Big Monster and Corporal Little Monster, to invade the Star Sphere with the five-colored magical gems, the ultimate weapon that possesses significang power and can give life and intelligence to machines. As a result, the two were unfortunate enough to throw four mysterious gems into their car, leaving only one behind. A genius mechanic on the Starsphere, Dr. Otaku, inadvertently activates the four gems while repairing electrical junk. Under the leadership of Dr. Otaku, a fight begins with the invaders in several kinds of strange and fierce struggles. The last gem eventually turns into Superman. Thus the fight between Superman and the invaders gradually becomes more interesting.

- Happy Baby: Happy Superman (Season 2)

Since Careful Superman joined the team, the five Supermen have finally managed to get together. However, the Supermen keep giving Dr. Geek all kinds of trouble. In order to change this situation, Dr. Otaku found a school called "Super Star Academy" for the Supermen, so that the Supermen can learn something and cause less trouble. At the same time, due to the pressure of livelihood and the need for aggression, Big Monster also had to lead Little Monster to sneak into the Super Star Academy, and work as a cleaner. The Commander of the Grey Heart Planet made a decision to establish a monster academy in the Star Planet to train more monsters and to facilitate the invasion of the Star Planet. So a hilarious confrontation is about to begin.

- Happy Baby: Happy Superman Battle (Season 3)

The story continues to unfold between the Superman team led by Happy Superman and the two sides of Big Big Monster and Little Little Monster. The Monster Academy has been in place for quite some time, and Gigantor has finally produced a stable of monsters, but the invasion is still going very hard.

Meanwhile, the supers are learning more and more tricks, which puts more pressure on Da Da Monster. He tries everything he can, and the battle becomes even more intense.

Careful Superman Superman's sidekick, Admiral Knight of the Planet Adri, the God of War, Garo, makes his debut this season.

In the season finale, the Intergalactic Car Championship, Dada Monster finds a top secret file from Happy Superman's car. The file reveals that many years ago, Planet Greyheart had spread a virus to the planet in order to invade the planet, and those infected would become the puppets of Planet Greyheart, with Dr. Otaku being one of the infected.

- Happy Baby: Happy Adventure (Season 4)

The story unfolds in the context of an alliance between Planet Greyheart and Starsphere, with some episodes taking place on Planet Greyheart. The five Supermen came to Planet Greyheart for adventure. During a battle, Locomotive Man was destroyed by the Gargoyle Monster, and the five Supermen, believing the engineer's words, voluntarily transformed back into Mechanical Stones - actually a conspiracy set up by the Greyheart Commander. Thanks to the help of Warlord Galo and television principal, the five Supermen are reborn and given a new and upgraded version of Locomotive Man.

In the season finale, the Intergalactic Car Championship, Big Big Monster finds a top secret file from Happy Superman's car. The file reveals that many years ago, Planet Greyheart had spread a virus to the planet in order to invade the planet, and those infected would become the puppets of Planet Greyheart, with Dr. Otaku being one of the infected.

- Happy Baby: Happy Star Planet (Season 5)

This season continues the story of the previous movie. In order to invade the Planet Greyheart, a dark virus has been spread to the Planet Greyheart. Once the virus is activated, the infected will be controlled by the Planet Greyheart. Dr. Otaku appears in the list of infected people. Dr. Otaku is activated by Big Big Monster, and Dr. Taku runs away from his home to become Planet Greyheart's puppet, Dr. Black, who is controlled by Nig Big Monster to develop weapons for the invasion of the Planet.

- Happy Baby: The Adventures of Ancient Spirit Star (Season 6)

Star ball found a mysterious ancient planet, called "ancient spirit star", contains a variety of mysterious resources, scientists have been difficult to locate it. In order to find the highly dangerous radioactive elements from the planet and prevent it from harming the universe, the principal of the TV set and the scientist, Li Men, led five superheroes to form an expedition team to explore the planet.

Commander Greyheart ordered Big Big Monster and Little Little Monster to go undercover in the expedition team to steal the results of the expedition team at any time and bring the results back to Greyheart Planet for the invasion of the planet. Big Big Monster and Little Little Monster, on the other hand, are looking for the three Supermen, who are the guardians of the planet Gurin, as well as the energy stone that can invade the Planet, and they also take the spaceship together. Soon after, Dr. Otaku, Sister Taozi, and Bulb Boss also come to the planet to explore the planet. On the surface, Big and Little Monster are also part of the expedition team, but in fact, they have been using various methods to deal with the five Supermen during the expedition. At the same time, they also want to take over the useful resources collected during the journey and the important information discovered by Superman for themselves. The five Supermen settle down on the planet, exploring, living and learning, and are often disturbed by the strange creatures in the rainforest and the strange phenomena on the planet. The Supermen cope with the unknown environment while dealing with all sorts of sabotage from the big and small monsters in the shadows.

However, a series of unintentional events cause the expedition members to wonder - is the planet Gurin really as primitive as they see it? Later on, the expedition team accidentally enters the mysterious Mechanical City and explores the lost civilizations of the past. In the end, a series of mysteries were solved, and they bid farewell to the planet and returned to the planet.

- Happy Baby：Happy Alliance Battle (Season 7)

Woof Planet, ruled by dogs, and Meow Planet, ruled by cats, both wanted to establish an alliance with the Starsphere, so they each sent goodwill ambassadors to the Starsphere to inspect the planet and try to find ways to draw in the Starsphere people. But Woof Cai Xing and Meow Meow Xing are two hostile planets, and their purpose of coming to the Star Planet at the same time is not only to strengthen communication with the Star Planet, but also for another reason, which is purely to prevent each other from having a good time. They are often at loggerheads, and the resulting conflicts are fanned by the Big Big and Little Little monsters, which can spread to the entire planet.

While the Supermen continue to guard the planet, they must also prevent the dispute between the Woof Cai and Meow Meow from causing a crisis in the Planet. Meanwhile, the children of the two ambassadors are enrolled in the Super Star Academy and become classmates with the Five Supermen and Little Little Monsters. The struggle between the two children adds a lot of instability to the Supermen's school life.

At the end of the season, Scarab invades the Planet of the Stars in conjunction with Kai sa, the evil Adelie Star Army Chief, and the Five Supermen are poisoned and lose their fighting ability. In the end, Galo, sacrifices himself to protect the Starsphere.

- Happy Baby ：Amazing Journey (Season 8)

After Meow Meow and Woof Wealthy leave the Star Ball amicably, the Star Ball's Ball Captain is put in a coma by a magical attack by Big and Little Monsters and their new sidekick, Oooh Haha. Mr. Pepsi probes that the only way to free the Head Ball is to find the four wands of Wind, Fire, Thunder, and Ice in a mysterious book that records the customs and traditions of the Middle Ages. In order to undo the magic in the Head Ball, the Supermen Mystery Book traveled to Medieval Town. They stayed in Medieval Town, and with the help of the local residents and the king, they used the limited clues to find the four wands that were left behind by the legendary Master of the Kingdom, Laughing Haha.

Not wanting to let Superman get the four wands to save the Chief Ball, Big Big and Little Little Monster and Hohaha also enter Medieval Town, and with the help of Hohaha become the commander of the black magic wizards, leading a group of black magic wizards to fight against Superman, waiting for an opportunity to obstruct their search for the wands. Superman, Big Big and Little Little Monster and Hahaha fight for the wand. In the end, the Supermen gather all four wands and return to the real world, utilizing their power to rescue the Head of the Ball, and once again thwarting Big and Little's plot.

At the end of the season, Galo, who was originally killed in action to protect the Star Sphere in the seventh season of this series, "Legends of War", leaves behind the seal and a television in its shape, and Galo's life and death become confusing (it is later explained in Season Twelve that it was a resurrected Garo who traveled back in time in order to investigate the truth about the Energy Nucleus).

- Happy Supermen League ：Defense of Hyperspace (Season 9)

After the disappearance of Dr. Otaku, Otaku tries to design a time machine based on the time machine design left behind by Dr. Otaku, and after many efforts, he realizes that a well-made time machine can only travel back to the time when the time machine existed. Many years later, Happy Superman accidentally discovers the time machine and accidentally travels through it to the time when Dr. Otaku was small. Due to the special setting of the time machine, they can only go back to the past but not to the future, and Dr. Otaku was withdrawn and had no friends when he was young. The Supermen decided to stay in the past to take care of Dr. Geek as an older brother and sister, so that Dr. Otaku would be cheerful and learn to take care of himself, and at the same time, they had to find a way to go back to the future, and at the same time, they also had to deal with the Big Big and Little Little Monsters and their destruction of the monster. When Big Big and Little Little Monsters see Superman entering the past, they want to destroy the machine so that they can never come back, but Little Little Monster accidentally follows them to the past and finds Big Big Monster in the past. Since Biggie was lower in rank than Tiny, he had to become Little's henchman and follow Little's orders.

- Happy Supermen League ：Return of the Heroes (Season 10)

A continuation of the story that unfolded in the previous installment. The Supermen say goodbye to Otaku and return from the past to the present to continue guarding Star Planet. However, there is a bigger crisis waiting for them in the planet: the Commander sends a magical cape to Big Big Monster, which can take out a lot of props to enhance the monster's ability, so that Big Big Monster and Little Little Monster can invade the planet more easily!

To cope with this crisis, Superman also continues to upgrade his skills at the Super Star Academy to better guard the planet. Meanwhile, the remaining energy body of the God of War, Galo, is activated by the Third Elder of the planet Adelie, and accidentally uncovers a conspiracy powerful enough to destroy the Planet. In the end, Galo uses his ability to possess electrical appliances to transfer the soon-to-be-exploded Type 4451 Ultimate Weapon, which is successfully resurrected and materialized after accidentally absorbing the blast energy in the big explosion in outer space, and returns to Superman's team to fight side-by-side with everyone else to guard the Planet of the Stars!

- Happy Supermen League ： Crisis in the Stars (Season 11)

After a devastating explosion on the distant planet Gurin, the three surviving Supermen came to the planet to ask for help from the League of Supermen. The five Supermen, led by Happy Superman, decide to search for the truth of the explosion of Gurin Star in order to uphold the justice of the universe. When the five Supermen trace the clues of the destruction of the Ancient Spirit Star, they find two more mysterious villains - Moon Dance and Star Shadow - stopping them from pursuing their actions, and there is actually a bigger force behind Star Shadow and Moon Dance. After destroying the Ancient Spirit Planet, their next goal is to destroy the Star Sphere and capture the energy core.

The Biker, who has always been regarded as Superman's comrade-in-arms, has been infected by a virus and has gone out of control, causing Superman to face a huge crisis. The fully destroyed locomotive has been restored by Dr. Geek with the addition of an artificial intelligence system, which not only responds to Superman's calls, but also serves as Superman's right-hand man in analyzing his battle strategies during the battle. Meanwhile, the three Supermen who have lost their homes in Guring Star, with the encouragement of Happy Superman and others, start to face their past grief bravely and regain their strength.

- Happy Supermen League ：Star Alliance (Season 12)

Moon Dance and Star Shadow were escorted to the Cosmic Prison by Intergalactic Interpol Stan for destroying the Ancient Spirit Planet and seizing the Energy Nucleus. In order to find the truth about the explosion of the Adelie Star, Galo went to the Intergalactic Prison to investigate, but the Intergalactic Prison was attacked by a mysterious person, and Moon Dance and Star Shadow's memories about the Energy Nucleus were erased, so Galo prepared to go to investigate the mysterious person. On the other hand, Hank, the examiner of the Intergalactic League of Supermen, came to the Star Sphere to publicize the test enrollment of the League of Supermen, and the story of the five Supermen and other people who wanted to join the test process of the League of Supermen began. During the test process, the five Supermen and the other candidates and examiners accidentally discovered - when Galo sleeps or loses consciousness will be a mysterious dark force will be controlled by a mysterious man to become a mystery man and go to seize the energy nucleus, finally learned the truth of Galo choose to inhibit their own power and fell into an eternal slumber.

- Happy Supermen League : Guardians of the Energy Nucleus (Season 13)

Happy Superman and the other 4 Supermens go to the planet Cinderella to track down the whereabouts of the escaped Moon Dancing Star Shadow, but accidentally discover that Moon Dancing Star Shadow's purpose is actually the energy core of Cinderella. Careful Superman and the League of Supermen sent the Malfunction Superman to investigate the method of removing the dark power in Galo's body Superman in the process of tracking down, accidentally learned that Big Big Monster is the real culprit behind the invasion of the Star Planet all the time, but in order to protect the Planet of the Grey Heart, the Supermen decided to temporarily cooperate with Big Big Monster to fight against the Lunar Dance Star Shadow. In the process, they not only discover the major secret hidden behind the 5 energy cores, but also know the real source of the dark power in Galo's body. In the season finale Galo's power suppression device is damaged and Galo is completely controlled by the dark power.

- Happy Superman League: Star Power (Season 14)

In ancient times, there were six Supermen who joined forces to fight monsters to guard the peace of the universe. Core Superman, one of the six Supermen, has been pursuing the greatest power in order to better protect the people. In order to fight against the monsters, the Six Supermen combined the power of the six and refined a powerful energy, Star Force, which is a life force that can break through the darkness. However, while refining the Star Force, the Six Supermen separated the Dark Force, which possesses destructive properties. For the safety of the universe, the Core Supermen took the initiative to absorb the Dark Force. He did not want the Dark Force to amplify Core Superman's desire to pursue power, and in the end, Core Superman was devoured by his desire and turned into a dark demon that jeopardized the universe. The five Supermen had to use the Star Power to defeat the Dark Devil, and transformed into five energy cores to seal the Dark Devil, and the Star Power was nowhere to be found.

- Happy Supermen League : Amazing Adventures of Mechanical Castle (Season 15)

Five superman in the execution of the mission, accidentally found in the body of the hidden can control their program code, in the process of investigation, the superman people found that all the clues are pointing to the universe development group hardware company. In order to solve the mystery, the Supermen embarked on the road to find the truth, and the conspiracy of the Hardware Company gradually surfaced. It turns out that Wogen once possessed the super-mechanical stone that gave birth to the Supermen and tried to transform the Supermen into their own weapons so as to dominate the universe. After learning the truth, the Supermen joined forces to destroy the Hardware Company and solved the crisis of the universe.

- Happy Supermen League: Fantastic Isle of Riddle (Season 16)

The League of Supermen seized a Prophecy Orb, which predicted that the Mermaid Princess of the Star Sphere's Myriad Isles would turn to foam and disappear, and cause a crisis in the Star Sphere's oceans. Five Superman received a mission from the League of Supermen and traveled to the Mermaid Tribe of Riddle Island to prophesy the occurrence. Unexpectedly, the magician Loho still took away the mermaid princess's song and made the mermaid princess turn into a bubble, and the supers failed to stop the prophecy from happening. In the end, the super people do not give up on the super people to join forces to defeat the music huh, to save the mermaid princess has become a bubble, to save the underwater world.

- Happy Supermen League :Alien Trek (Season 17)

The planetary robots are infected with a Trojan Horse program that begins to harm humans. Since this Trojan Horse program is so old that it can only be developed in the past, Happy Superman goes back to the past, the planet Aura, to look for the peace code that can remove the Trojan Horse program. Unexpectedly, Happy Superman returns to a time and space where the peace code has not yet been successfully developed, and at this time, human beings and robots are in the midst of a major outbreak of conflicts. Happy Superman solves the conflicts in Aura Star while investigating the truth to find the peace code, during this period he met Tian Le, Dafu, Shuai Ao, Ding Mo and Leng Yue and helped them solve one problem after another, and at the same time, he also found out the truth about the conflicts between the robots and human beings, at last, Tian Le and the five of them sacrificed their lives for thwarting An's conspiracy to guard the Aura Star, and Happy Superman took the problematic viral code back to the Star In the end, Mechanical Thinker found the real peace code in the player, eliminated the Trojan Horse virus and foiled An's plot once again, while An also suffered from mental illness because of the two failures and stayed in the hospital of the Starsphere. In the past, Little Rock left their genes in the robot through gene fusion technology and became the Five Supermen of the Starsphere.

- Happy Supermen League: Parallel Time Adventure (Season 18)

At the request of Dr. Otaku, the Five Supermen and Galo go to save the planet in a parallel dimension ruled by the Black Fury. However, the Supermen are powerless against the powerful Darkseid. After learning that only the Axe can defeat the Black Sirens, the Supermen, Galo, and Dr. Otaku embark on an adventure to find the Axe.

- Happy Supermen League: City of Valor 1 - The Legend of the Chess Beasts (Season 19)

Dr.Otaku's father, Dr.Otaku, disappeared while exploring the City of Courage, and the only set of fighting pieces left at the scene was broken up in the fight with the villains and transformed into eight chess beasts, which were scattered across the continents of the City of Courage. In order to know the secrets hidden in the chess pieces, so as to find the whereabouts of the house again Jia, the supers embarked on a journey to collect the chess pieces. As the supers investigate further, they realize that things are not as simple as they thought, and a bigger conspiracy is gradually surfacing.

- Happy Supermen League :City of Valor 2 - The Superman Project (Season 20)

The evil villain wants to use the energy of the chess beast to create a large number of "duplicate superman" to disturb the whole universe. In order to stop this plan, the Supermen regroup, break through the obstacles set by the villain, solve the mystery step by step, and finally face the villain and his duplicate Supermen, a battle about the safety of the universe is about to start. ......

=== TV spin-offs ===
- "Funny Star Planet"

It intercepts seasons one through nine of the main "Happy Baby" TV version for episodes of classic, hilarious shorts.

- "Happy Superman Alliance: Magic Laboratory"

Dr. zhai leads the Supermen, led by Happy Superman, to find the missing vital parts and recreate them. In the process, the supers learn the science behind the workings of some of life's everyday things.

- "Happy Superman League Mystery City"

A long time ago, the planet Adri discovered a special energy source that was so powerful that it was coveted by other planets in the universe, and several forces fought over it. In order to prevent bringing disaster to the planet Adelie, the god of war of Adelie built a deep-sea city in the planet called "Earth Star", buried the energy in it, and even divided the key to open the underwater city into five pieces and set up five major mysteries to stop the evil people.

The story takes place when Galo and Beware of Superman, in pursuit of a stolen monster, are led to the "Earth Star" and are involved in a "mysterious lake monster incident". During this time, they meet Liza, a young girl who is searching for her missing friend Finch in Mystic Lake, and together they solve the mystery of the water monster. However, Garo realizes that all this is inextricably linked to the planet Adelie, and so Garo, Beware of Superman and Liza embark on a journey to investigate the five major mysteries.

== Related works ==
=== Animated Films ===
several seasons	name	length of time	Release date
Season 1	Happy Heroes	95 minutes	June 28, 2013
Season 2	Happy Heroes 2: Qiyuan Planet Wars	90 minutes	July 18, 2014
Season 3	Happy Heroes: The Stones	96 minutes	July 22, 2022
Season 4	Happy Heroes: Multiverse Rescue	102 minutes	January 20, 2024
Season 5	Happy Heroes: Rebal Rescue	99 minutes	May 1, 2025

=== Donghua ===
- Prior to the start of the animated Happy Baby on television, an official "four-panel comic" of Happy Baby was released, with the same setting and characters as the anime, but with little to no relevance to the plot.
- The Happy Superman Movie Comic Strip was published by the People's Posts and Telecommunications Publishing House in June 2013, with a total of 128 pages printed on coated paper. The Happy Superman Movie Comic Strip is a movie comic strip designed with frame-grabbing stills from the Happy Superman movie.
- In addition to this, a considerable number of comics have been published in the Happy Baby series, all of which are based on the TV version of the film in scratch-framed stills.

=== Puppet theater ===
The puppet show "Adventures in Music City" was performed on October 26 and 27, 2013 at Huanghuagang Theater in Guangzhou.

== Awards ==
particular year	awards	recipient
2013	The 10th China Animation Golden Dragon Award Ceremony "Best Animated Movie Award"	Happy Baby
2010.04	The second batch of key arts and cultural projects in Guangdong Province	Happy Baby
2010.09	The Seventh "Guangzhou Literary Award"	Happy Baby
2010	China's Top Ten Most Valuable Animated Images of the Year Award	Happy Baby
2010	Western Animation Festival Best Art Nomination	Happy Baby
2010	The Third Batch of Excellent Domestic Animated Films in 2010	Happy Baby
2010	Evaluation of Special Funds for Children's Excellence and Domestic Animation Development National Outstanding Domestic Animation Film Award First Prize	Happy Baby
2011	The first batch of excellent domestic animated films in 2011	Happy Baby
2010	The Second China Top Ten Most Valuable Animation Images of the Year Award	Happy Baby
2011	The Third China Annual Top Ten Outstanding Animation Songs Award	Theme song "Fly Happy Forward
2012	Asia Animation Venture Award for Outstanding Work	Happy Baby

== Critical reception ==
This movie review provides a more comprehensive assessment of the animation Happy Baby. In terms of narrative structure, the animation's plot design is relatively unique, with the gradual unfolding of the main mission to investigate the truth about the ancient Spirit Star adding a certain appeal to the story. In terms of characterization and plot development, the animation also demonstrates a certain degree of depth, successfully creating a series of three-dimensional character images through delicate portrayals and plot arrangements, and making the story development more compact.

However, it should be pointed out that the animation may be a bit abrupt or not smooth enough in the handling of certain plots, which to a certain extent affects the audience's viewing experience. In addition, for the characterization of some of the characters, there may still be some places that are worth digging deeper and showing.

To summarize, the animation Happy Baby has certain merits in terms of plot design and characterization, but there are also some areas that need to be improved. For viewers who like animation, they can decide whether to watch this work according to their own interests.

China's domestic sci-fi animation classic IP "Happy Superman: Time and Space Rescue" is now playing in theaters nationwide. It has aired 19 seasons (more than 1,300 episodes) and 3 animated movies. Huang Weiming said that the emotional expression is more in-depth this time, using the father-son relationship as a point of emotional reflection. The movie advances the plot from the perspectives of Beware of Superman and Garo, blending science fiction and costume elements. Audiences can look forward to a more complete universe worldview and more excellent works. Meanwhile, director Li Weiwei believes that all these characters have their own unique personalities and flaws. Each character has its own story, which is part of the emotional core.

The animated movie Happy Superman, directed by Wong Wai Ming, tells the story of five little superheroes on a star ball defending their home. The film was released on June 14, 2013, on China Arts Network and Children's Channel. According to Huang Weiming, the key to defeating the powerful "Western Superman" and the Chinese Superman with his own characteristics is "sense of humor" and "life". Huang Weiming believes that surpassing himself and realizing the surpassing of "Pleasant Goat and Big Big Wolf" is the biggest difficulty in the process of creation.
