= Virampur =

- Village
- Country: India
- State: Gujarat
- District: Banaskantha district

Population
  - Total: 5,206

Languages
  - Official: Gujarati and Hindi
- Time zone: UTC+5:30 (IST)
- PIN: 385110

Virampur is a village in the eastern part Banaskantha district of Gujarat, India. It is located 140 km from state capital Gandhinagar. The total geographical area of Virampur village is 3992.8 hectares. Virampur has a total population of 5,206 people.
