= Hubička (film) =

- Starring: Emil Artur Longen
- Cinematography: Antonín Pech
- Release date: 1911
- Country: Czech Republic
- Language: Silent

Hubička is a 1911 Austro-Hungarian comedy film.
