= Homayoun (film) =

2019 film

Homayoun is a 2019 film about the life and work of Homayoun Sanaatizadeh. It was directed by the Iranian documentary filmmaker Pirooz Kalantari. Sanaatizadeh is considered as one of the first entrepreneurs of modern Iran. In this documentary, Kalantari tries to shed light on the characteristic traits of Sanaatizadeh as well as his role as the founder of the Iran branch of the Franklyn publishing house.

== Synopsis ==
By taking advantages of the poems and the letters of Sanaatizadeh and also through the memories of those who were close to him, this documentary tries to shed light on the life of the main character from birth to his last days. The film also focuses on the challenges of Homayoun Sanaatizadeh throughout his life before and after the Iranian Revolution in 1979 and his days in prison.

In order to increase dramatic effects of the picture we can hear the poems and other transcripts of the main character through a voice over.

== Director's commentary ==
Kalantari said "for me Homayoun was an experience in creating the dram of the life of a character and a parallel work of making a person known, and also getting to know him myself. it was a challenge to reach a proper construct, making the interviewees more active in order to reach that dramatic effect."
