= Hasmukh Saab ki Wasihat =

- Written by: Mahesh Dattani
- Produced by: Mahesh Dattani
- Starring: Mohan Agashe; Achint Kaur; Seema Pahwa
- Release date: 2005
- Country: India
- Language: Hindi

Hasmukh Saab ki Wasihat is a 2015 Indian Hindi-language film directed by Mahesh Dattani. It stars Mohan Agashe in the lead role along with Achint Kaur, and Seema Pahwa.

== Synopsis ==
Hasmukh Mehta is a power-hungry man who controls his family and business empire with an iron fist. His weak son, Ajit, and belittled wife, Sonal, endure his abusive behavior. They hope to inherit his wealth when he passes away. However, Hasmukh's plan takes a sinister turn. Though he dies, he manipulates them through a complex will that dictates their every move. He even employs his mistress, Kiran Jhaveri, to act as his proxy. But, as expected, things don't go according to plan.

== Cast ==
- Mohan Agashe as Hasmukh Mehta
- Achint Kaur as Kiran Jhaveri
- Seema Pahwa as Mrs. Sonal Mehta
- Gagan Singh Sethi as Ajit Mehta
- Mona Wasu as Preeti Mehta
