= Hypnotist's Revenge =

- Directed by: Georges Méliès
- Starring: Georges Méliès
- Production company: Star Film Company
- Release dates: 1908 (completed); November 3, 1909 (US release)
- Country: France
- Language: Silent

Hypnotist's Revenge was a 1908 French short silent comedy film by Georges Méliès. The film, now presumed lost, is a skit on the popular topic of hypnotism; it featured a magician-hypnotist using his skills to cheat at cards, before being caught at it and pursued in a hectic chase.

== Plot ==
A hypnotist-magician, invited to a wealthy man's house party, amuses the guests with various tricks. After his performance, he joins the guests for a game of cards, suggesting that they play for money. He uses his professional skills to cheat lavishly, and has soon collected all the winnings. The guests, discovering the fraud, chase the hypnotist out of the house and all around the area. At length the chase takes the hypnotist back to the house, where he hypnotizes his pursuers and makes a safe exit.

== Production ==
Méliès played the hypnotist in the film, which was completed in 1908. Hypnotism was a popular topic at the time, inspiring films such as The Hypnotic Wife (Pathé, 1909), The Criminal Hypnotist (D. W. Griffith, Biograph Studios, 1909), and Max Hypnotized (Max Linder, Pathé, 1910). Méliès had also previously used the topic in his 1897 film A Hypnotist at Work.

== Release ==
The film was sold by Méliès's Star Film Company and is numbered 1408–1415 in its catalogues. No French-language title for the film is known. In America, the film was initially slated to be issued on October 27, 1909, alongside Gaston Méliès's film For Sale, a Baby; both films were postponed to November 3, and Gaston Méliès's Cinderella Up-to-Date took their place on October 27.

Hypnotist's Revenge is currently presumed lost.
