= Hepcat in the Funky Hat =

1961 Japanese action film

- Film poster
- Directed by: Kinji Fukasaku
- Starring: Sonny Chiba
- Production companies: New Toei Tokyo; Toei Company
- Distributed by: Toei Company
- Release date: August 5, 1961
- Running time: 53 minutes
- Country: Japan
- Language: Japanese

Hepcat in the Funky Hat (ファンキーハットの快男児, Funky Hat no kaidanji) is a 1961 action comedy film directed by Kinji Fukasaku and starring Sonny Chiba. It was followed by a sequel, Hepcat in the Funky Hat: The 20,000,000 Yen Arm, which was released one month later that same year and was also directed by Kinji Fukasaku with Sonny Chiba and Shiro Okamoto in the same roles.

== Plot ==
Ichiro Tenka lives in Tokyo working as a part-time car salesman and spending his free time picking up girls with his friend Shigeru. Midori Sakaino accepts Ichiro's invitation to a jazz club, but spends her time focused on her losses in the stock market. She devises a plan and photographs a meeting between Director-General Kogure, the man in charge of selecting the contractor for the construction of the Hall of Industry, and one of the potential contractors.

Shigeru gives a ride to Rume, the housekeeper of the Kogure family, and they learn that her employers' son Yasuyuki has been kidnapped. Midori meets Mr. Kogure with the plan to use the photograph to pressure him into confessing who the contractor will be so that she can buy stock in that company before its value rises, but instead she is mistaken for the kidnapper and questioned by Ichiro's father Seisuke, the head of the Tenka Detective Agency.

Tomoko Sakurai, the real kidnapper, calls the Kogure residence and tells them that Rume must meet her in the park with 5 million yen. Rume follows instructions but draws the attention of a policeman who believes that she has run away from home. When he sees the money she is carrying, Seisuke and his employees have to explain the situation, causing the media to become aware of the kidnapping and leading to the press camping outside of the Kogure residence, where they discover Yasuyuki returning home alone. Searching through Yasuyuki's clothes, Mr. Kogure discovers a badge from the golf club he frequents, leading him to know that the kidnapper must have been someone aware of his plans to receive a kickback for awarding the construction contract to Hinomaru Construction. Mr. Ugajin of Hinomaru Construction still has his pin, so Mr. Kogure determines that the man behind the kidnapping is his own secretary Mr. Shiraishi.

Midori sees Tomoko buying a significant amount of shares in Hinomaru Construction, so she follows her but gets caught and tied up. Ichiro witnesses Shiraishi handing over Hinomaru Construction stock certificates to the gangster Tiger, who is out on bail. Ichiro pursues tiger and learns the identities and whereabouts of the kidnappers. He pretends to be a criminal willing to get rid of Midori's body and successfully rescues her from Tomoko's apartment. Mr. Shiraishi is taken by Mr. Kogure and Mr. Ugajin to a construction site to be killed, but Ichiro shows up and defeats the yakuza hired by Mr. Kogure and Mr. Ugajin. The police called by Midori arrive and arrest Mr. Kogure and the others. The Tenka Detective Agency received positive press, causing the agency to become swarmed with clients.

== Cast ==
- Sonny Chiba as Ichiro Tenka
- Hitomi Nakahara as Midori
- Shigeko Arai as Rume
- Shiro Okamoto as Shigeru Kondo
- Machiko Yashiro as Tomoko Sakurai
- Susumu Namishima as Shiraishi
- Hisao Toake as Sakaino
- Ken Sudo as Oshita
- Yoshi Katō as Kogure
- Tokue Hanazawa as Kiyosuke
- Takashi Kanda as Ugajin
- Rikiya Iwaki as Takada
- Tokuei Hanazawa as Seisuke Tenka
- Kenji Shio as Tiger on Bail
- Akiken Sawa as Securities Company Employee
- Hiroshi Takada as Akibayashi
- Yukiko Yajima as Female clerk at the Ministry of Industry and Trade
- Toshiko Okada as Takuko Kubo
- Ichiro Kojima as Ugajin's subordinate
- Tatsuya Kitayama as Reporter
- Koh Katayama as Securities Company Employee
- Chenya Sato as Police Officer
- Chieko Taki as Kindergarten Employee
- Yuko Hinoki as Hisae Kogure
- Masato Kusakabe as Yasuyuki Kogure
- Junnosuke Takasu as Yakuza

== Production ==
The film was shot in black and white with mono sound.

== Release ==
Its title has been translated as Vigilante in the Funky Hat, Hepcat with a Funky Hat, Hepcat in the Funky Hat, and Man with the Funky Hat.

== Sequel ==
The film was followed by a sequel, Hepcat in the Funky Hat: The 20,000,000 Yen Arm, released in Japan one month later on September 13, 1961.

== Reception ==
Mikko Koivisto of elitisti gave the film a score of 3.5/5, calling it "an enjoyable piece of the early history of the promising young director and actor".
