= Hepcat in the Funky Hat: The 20,000,000 Yen Arm =

1961 Japanese action film

- Toei DVD cover
- Directed by: Kinji Fukasaku
- Starring: Sonny Chiba
- Production company: New Toei Tokyo
- Release date: September 13, 1961
- Running time: 52 minutes
- Country: Japan
- Language: Japanese

Hepcat in the Funky Hat: The 20,000,000 Yen Arm (ファンキーハットの快男児 二千万円の腕, Funky Hat no kaidanji: Nisenman-en no ude) is a 1961 action comedy film directed by Kinji Fukasaku and starring Sonny Chiba. It is the sequel to the original Hepcat in the Funky Hat film released in Japan one month earlier that same year also directed by Kinji Fukasaku and starring Sonny Chiba and Shiro Okamoto in the same roles.

== Plot ==
At the National Championship High School Baseball Tournament, the pitcher Hiroshi Kawahara leads Wakaba High School of Tokai to victory. Agent Yamada of the Nantetsu Kinki Socks, Agent Noguchi of the West Nippon Suspense, and Agent Sasaki of the Great Tokyo Towers seek to sign him, while Kawahara's signing price increases by 1,000,000 yen with each home run he hits.

Sports journalist Miyako Takeshi's conservative father tries to match her up with an aspiring plastic surgeon named Ken'ichi Nishizawa by giving her a ticket to a musical performance sitting next to him, but Ichiro Tenka follows her and sits next to her instead. When Ken'ichi is found drowned with alcohol on his shirt, Mr. Takeshi complains to the private investigator, Ichiro's father Mr. Tenka, that Ken'ichi was not the upstanding suitor that Mr. Tenka had promised him. The taxi driver Yosabura tells Ichiro that Ken'ichi had walked into the street drunk. Ichiro accepts a job from Agent Yamada of the Nantetsu Kinki Socks for 50 thousand yen.

Ichiro and Kondo visit Hamano Beach to speak with Karahara's family. Kawahara's sister says that he was excited about going to college but then his family borrowed money from Mr. Kurotani in order to open a shop. When Mr. Kurotani began pressuring them into paying it back immediately, Kawahara decided to skip college and go pro in order to get money for his family. Mr. Kurotani's secretary Mr. Iwasaki brings Hiroshi's father to meetings with various baseball teams, though Mr. Kawahara knows nothing about baseball.

Ichiro pretends to be a baseball reporter in order to gain access to Kurotani, leading Miyako to believe that he is the competition trying to take her scoop. From the fact that Kurotani's men return carrying a lantern, Ichiro deduces that they are keeping Hiroshi captive on Naval Ship Island, which can only be reached during ebb tide.

Ichiro follows Kurotani to a hotel where he is negotiating a deal for Hiroshi with Agent Noguchi of the West Nippon Suspense and Kondo bribes a bellboy to borrow his clothes and deliver flowers with a tape recorder in the vase to Kurotani's room. Miyako pays a hotel employee to deliver her own tape recorder in a vase, replacing Ichiro's. After the meeting, Kondo retrieves the vase and finds tape of Kurotani demanding 10 million yen for Hiroshi but also 10 million yen for himself at a meeting at 10 a.m. the next morning. Kurotani has a plastic surgeon quickly conceal the damage to Hiroshi Kawahara's face and valuable arm for the purposes of the meeting.

Mr. Iwasaki and Kurotani's other men trap Miyako and the plastic surgeon and admit that they killed Nishizawa because he had threatened to tell the police about Hiroshi Kawahara. Ichiro and Kondo fight off Kurotani's men until the police arrive to arrest them. Kurotani attends the planned meeting but is presented with a warrant for his arrest. Mr. Tenka tells Hiroshi that he will be taken to the hospital to check on his arm and that he can choose whether or not to go pro.

== Cast ==
- Sonny Chiba as Ichiro Tenka
- Shiro Okamoto as Shigeru Kondo
- Rikiya Iwaki as Takada

== Production ==
The film was shot in black and white with mono sound.

== Release ==
The film was released in Japan on September 13, 1961. Its title has been translated as Vigilante in the Funky Hat: The 20 Million Yen Arm and Hepcat with a Funky Hat: The 20,000,000 Yen Arm.

== Reception ==
In her book Japanese Cinema Between Frames, Laura Lee writes, "Its speedy style was intended to match the athleticism and physical prowess of newcomer star Sonny Chiba, and the spectacle and spectacle during the opening, followed by the televised version, orients the spectator to the hypervisuality of the film, in preparation for the virtuosic camera movements and rapidity that follows."

Maxime Grave of Kurosawa Cinema gave the film a score of 3/5, calling it "a lot of fun" and "a pleasure to watch".

Asian Cinema gave the film a score of 6.5/10.

Senesi Michele Man Chi of AsianFeast.org gave the film a rating of 4/5, calling it "An important film for discovering the origins of an idea of coherent cinema that the director will carry on until the end of his career."
