= How the Sith Stole Christmas =

- Directed by: Ted Bracewell
- Written by: Ted Bracewell
- Produced by: Ted Bracewell
- Starring: Ted Bracewell; Nick Marchetti; Angela Duke; Ben Fletcher
- Music by: James Horner; John Williams
- Production company: Bracewell Films
- Distributed by: TheForce.Net
- Release date: December 2002
- Running time: 17 minutes
- Country: United States
- Language: English

How the Sith Stole Christmas is an animated short fan film from that made its debut on the internet in December 2002. It was written, produced, and directed by Ted Bracewell, who also stars in the film.

== Plot ==
The film tells the story of the Emperor's plans to invade the North Pole and take Santa Claus prisoner. Melvin the Elf ends up in the thick of things, and must help rescue Santa. Darth Vader is sent on a separate mission to destroy Christmas for the Ewok inhabitants of Endor, but when an unexpected chain of events leaves him stranded on the planet, Vader is confronted by a vision from the past and sent on an incredible journey through spacetime.

== Parody ==
The film parodies Dr. Seuss's How the Grinch Stole Christmas! by mixing it with elements of the Star Wars films, as well as parodying elements of The Hobbit, A Charlie Brown Christmas, and Citizen Kane. The film has a very distinct and lush look, as Bracewell animated the film himself using a combination of painted backgrounds, painted cutout characters, and 3D animation.

== Planned sequels ==
The released film is subtitled "Jingle Far, Far Away", and is the first part of a trilogy. A trailer has been released for Parts Two and Three ("Silent Night, Jedi Knight" and "A Very Vader Christmas"), but the finished episodes have yet to be released.

== Reception ==
Part One has proven to be a popular download at TheForce.Net, and has screened at the DragonCon film festival and the 2004 Microcinema Fest. The film was highlighted as a "post-modern" fanfilm in an article on the genre in The Weekly Standard. The film was featured prominently in the September 2004 issue of Movie Magic Magazine, which called the film a "standout" in the genre.
