= Hocus Focus (film) =

2024 Hindi-language film

- Directed by: Paierry Dodeja
- Written by: Paierry Dodeja
- Produced by: Aashish Rego
- Starring: Suchhi Kumar; Satinder Singh Gahlot; Sona Bhandari
- Cinematography: D’Deb
- Edited by: Avinash Walzade
- Music by: Ajay Vas; Samsara Sounds
- Release date: 9 August 2024
- Running time: 90 mins
- Country: India
- Language: Hindi

Hocus Focus is a Hindi language drama film released on 9 August 2024. Produced under the banners of SOC Films and Kaushal Entertainment, this thriller delves into the dark and mysterious world of crime, deception, and surveillance.

== Cast ==
- Suchhi Kumar
- Satinder Singh Gahlot
- Sona Bhandari

== Production ==
Produced under the banners of SOC Films and Kaushal Entertainment, directed and written by Paierry Dodeja the film is produced by Aashish Rego, Ajit Pendurkar, co-produced by Satinder Singh Gahlot, Madhavi Ashtekar, Dilip Pithva. The Executive Producers are Ganessh Divekar, Rahul Khandare. The music is given by Ajay Vas, Samsara Sounds, lyrics by Prerna Sahetia, cinematography by D’Deb, editing by Avinash Walzade and background score by Aashish Rego.
