= Gunjan Menon =

Indian wildlife film director

- Born: Delhi, India
- Education: Symbiosis International University; MA Wildlife Filmmaking, University of the West of England, Bristol
- Occupations: Wildlife Film Director; Writer; Cinematographer; Presenter; Conservationist
- Years active: 2012–present
- Notable work: The Firefox Guardian

Gunjan Menon is an Indian wildlife film director, camerawoman, and National Geographic Explorer.

Her work predominantly focuses on conservation and human-interest stories and has been broadcast on Animal Planet India, Discovery Channel India, National Geographic, BBC Earth, and Disney+Hotstar. In 2018, she directed, shot and edited The Firefox Guardian, her debut film about the life of the first female forest guardian to work with Red Panda Network in Nepal, which premiered in Bristol, England. The film was noted for highlighting the role of community-driven conservation of red pandas and for having an intersectional and cross-genre approach in natural history storytelling. In 2020, she directed a seven part web-series, Rajasthan Royals, which highlights the lesser-known habitat, species, and communities living in and around the Kumbhalgarh Wildlife Sanctuary. She is currently working on her first feature-length documentary supported by the National Geographic Society.

Gunjan is the recipient of the Jackson Wild Rising Star Award, 2020, given to leaders in nature, conservation and science media. Additionally, two of her short films have been screened at the United Nations for Jackson Wild’s World Wildlife Day Film Showcase in partnership with CITES and the UNDP in 2020 and 2023.

== Education ==
Menon graduated in 2018 with an MA in Wildlife Filmmaking from the University of West of England, Bristol, a specialised degree offered in partnership with BBC-Natural History Unit. She received her bachelor's degree in audio visual communication from Symbiosis Centre for Media and Communication, Pune, Maharashtra in 2014.

== Career ==
In addition to her professional role as a storyteller, Menon is also a conservation communicator and filmmaking mentor. She is a TEDx speaker and been invited as a panellist and speaker to several film festivals and seminars including Jackson Wild in Wyoming, Nature Environment Wildlife Filmmakers (NEWF) Congress in Durban, South Africa, the Green Hub in Tezpur, and several other events in India. She also takes guest lectures and inspires school and college students to use wildlife filmmaking as a tool for change. She is currently a Girls Who Click partner photographer, leading workshops for female-identifying teenagers and a mentor for youngsters wishing to break into the field of wildlife filmmaking. In 2021, she was invited as a speaker to the India Today Conclave in New Delhi as a part of the "Defenders of the Earth" panel to discuss the role young conservationists can play in making environmental concerns a global priority.

== Wildlife films ==
Year	Title	Credit	Network	Links
2018	The Firefox Guardian	Director, Camera, Editor	Shorts TV (Amazon Prime)	Official Trailer
2018	On The Brink, Season 1	Assistant Director, Shooting Researcher, Sound	Animal Planet India, Discovery India, Disney+Hotstar	8 episodes, Season Trailer
2019	On The Brink, Season 2	Editor	National Geographic India, Disney+Hotstar	1 episode, Indian Pangolin
2020	Rajasthan Royals	Writer, director, Camera	Roundglass Sustain	Episode 1: Beyond the Fortress Episode 2: Muskaan, the Leopard Queen Episode 3: Kumbhalgarh through the eyes of a Forest Guard Episode 4: Home Affairs Episode 5: Black Magic
2021	Rajasthan Royals	Writer, director, Camera	Roundglass Sustain	Episode 6: Lakes of Udaipur Episode 7: Menar: A Lesson In Love
TBA	Born to be Wild	Director, Camera, Presenter		

== Awards and recognitions ==
=== Personal ===
- Jackson Wild Rising Star Award
- Young Achiever Award 2019, U-Special International Campus Film Festival, New Delhi
- National Geographic Storytelling Grant 2021
- ALT-EFF (All Living Things Environmental Film Festival) Ambassador
- Jackson Wild Advisory Council Member
- 2025 EC50 Winner/Inductee | The Explorers Club

=== Films ===
- BAFTA Student Awards Shortlist, 2018
- Best Student Short Documentary – International Wildlife Film Festival, Missoula, Montana, 2018
- Honourable Mention – Jackson Wild, UNEP and CITES World Wildlife Day Showcase, New York, 2020
- Tarshis Film Award – Animal Film Festival, California, 2018
- Best National Youth Film – CMS Vatavaran, New Delhi, 2019
- Best Student Documentary – Woodpecker International Film Festival, New Delhi, 2018
- Special Jury Award – Smita Patil International Documentary and Short Film Festival, Pune, 2018
- Best Documentary Short – Independent Shorts Award, 2018
- Special Mention – International Nature Film Festival Gödöllő - Hungary, 2019
- Best TV Reportage – 35rd Ménigoute Festival International du Film Ornithologique, Ménigoute 2019
- Best Documentary (student) for The Cyan Confluence' CIHWFF, Bhopal, 2013
- Finalist – Elements Film Festival, Canada 2018
- Finalist – NaturVision Film Festival, Germany 2018
- Finalist – Miami Independent Film Festival 2018
- Finalist – Golden Hollywood International Film Festival, Los Angeles, California 2019
- Finalist, Special Mention by WWF Sassari – Life After Oil International Film Festival, Sardegna 2019
- Finalist – Latin American Nature Awards, 2020
- Official Selection, Viva Film Festival, Sarajevo 2019
- Official Selection, Norwich Film Festival, Norfolk, 2018
- Official Selection, National Film Festival for Talented Youth, Seattle, 2018
- Annual European Union Film Festival Showcase, 2020
- Official Selection, Green Film Network Awards, 2020

== See also ==
- The Firefox Guardian
