= The Firefox Guardian =

The Firefox Guardian is a wildlife documentary directed by conservation filmmaker Gunjan Menon about red pandas and community-driven conservation in Nepal. It is a cross-genre intersectional documentary that discusses social issues faced by women in Nepal as well as an urgent need for conservation of endangered red pandas.

== Plot ==
The Firefox Guardian tells the story of the first female forest guardian to work with Red Panda Network, Menuka. Set in the remote bamboo forests of the Eastern Himalayas in Nepal, this short film takes viewers on a mesmerising journey into the world of red pandas, seen through the eyes of a native woman. With the red panda numbers rapidly declining in the wild, this unconventional warrior brings hope to the future of red panda conservation.

== Reception ==
The film premiered in Bristol, United Kingdom and was shortlisted for a student BAFTA award in 2018. It also won the Best Student Documentary at the CMS Vatavaran Film Festival, Woodpecker Film Festival, International Wildlife Film Festival, and among several national and international awards, was a part of the World Wildlife Day Film Showcase by Jackson Wild, United Nations Environment Program and CITES (Convention on International Trade in Endangered Species of Wild Flora and Fauna).

In a Sanctuary Asia review, the Firefox Guardian makes it to the top three in an article titled Ten Wildlife Short Films by Indian Filmmakers. "Another filmmaker may have tried to capitalise on Menuka’s charm or the ‘star quality’ of the fire fox, but Menon allows for the film to unfold gently and organically. Menon tells a succinct, moving story, and testament to her success is the fact that I was left wet-eyed by the film", writes the Commissioning Editor, Cara Tejpal.

"This film is not only a conglomeration of life stories about hard work with the passion for protecting nature but also plays an important role in depicting women empowerment." — Riya Saha, HLC Cult Critic

== Awards and nominations ==
- BAFTA Student Awards Shortlist, 2018
- Best Student Short Documentary — International Wildlife Film Festival, Missoula, Montana, 2018
- Honourable Mention — Jackson Wild, UNEP and CITES World Wildlife Day Showcase, New York, 2020
- Tarshis Film Award — Animal Film Festival, California, 2018
- Best National Youth Film — CMS Vatavaran, New Delhi, 2019
- Best Student Documentary — Woodpecker International Film Festival, New Delhi, 2018
- Special Jury Award — Smita Patil International Documentary and Short Film Festival, Pune, 2018
- Best Documentary Short — Independent Shorts Award, 2018
- Special Mention — International Nature Film Festival Gödöllő - Hungary, 2019
- Best TV Reportage — 35th Ménigoute Festival International du Film Ornithologique, Ménigoute 2019
- Finalist — Elements Film Festival, Canada 2018
- Finalist — NaturVision Film Festival, Germany 2018
- Finalist — Miami Independent Film Festival 2018
- Finalist — Golden Hollywood International Film Festival, Los Angeles, California 2019
- Finalist, Special Mention by WWF Sassari — Life After Oil International Film Festival, Sardegna 2019
- Finalist — Latin American Nature Awards, 2020
- Official Selection, Viva Film Festival, Sarajevo 2019
- Official Selection, Norwich Film Festival, Norfolk, 2018
- Official Selection, National Film Festival for Talented Youth, Seattle, 2018
- Annual European Union Film Festival Showcase, 2020
- Official Selection, Green Film Network Awards, 2020
