= Asa Mader =

American film director (born 1975)

- Born: February 20, 1975 (age 51)
- Education: Brown University; New York University
- Occupations: Film director, screenwriter, visual artist

Asa Mader (born February 20, 1975) is an American film director, screenwriter and visual artist.

== History ==
Asa Mader studied cinema and new technologies at Brown University and New York University and was awarded the Roberta Joslin Award for Excellence in Art with one of his first Super 8mm films.

Asa Mader co-founded the New York-based digital design studio DIGITAL FORM—which served many prominent brands in the high-end fashion and luxury market (YSL, Versace, Valentino, Bulgari, Cacharel, Dolce&Gabbana, Pucci, Paul Smith, Sisley, Missoni, Moschino, Vivienne Westwood and Oscar de la Renta).

Asa Mader then went on to direct his first narrative film La Maladie de La Mort, based on the homonymous novel by Marguerite Duras and starring Anna Mouglalis. The film was part of the official selection of the Venice Film Festival among others: Locarno Film Festival, “Premiers Plans” in Angers, Cannes Film Festival (Short Film Corner), International Film Festival of Kerala and the Festival “Entrevues” of Belfort.

In 2004, Asa Mader created his first stage direction HEROINE starring Anna Mouglalis, a theatrical installation/performance combining film projections and the texts of Ovid and Marguerite Yourcenar, along with text messages (SMS), all written proclamations of love, waiting and the anguish of love at a distance. HEROINE premiered at the Festival of Ortigia in Siracusa, Sicily.

In 2005, Asa directed two films for French TV - Little Italy: Wiseguys, Bullets, Backrooms is a docu-fiction based on the Soundwalk audio tours of the mythic mafia neighborhood of New York. Pigalle starring Lou Doillon is the first of a series of five films commissioned by Paris Première, in which a young actress takes you into the heart of her neighborhood, in this case the red-light district of Paris.

Asa Mader has co-written several of the Soundwalk audio tours, including one in NYC's DUMBO neighborhood and the official Da Vinci Code tour of the Louvre with Jean Reno.

In 2006, Asa Mader presented three large-format film and video installations shot in Bombay and commissioned by Lille3000 in the exhibition entitled Bombay: Maximum City. Additionally, Asa presented a diptych of "film portraits" on the writers Suketu Mehta (Pulitzer Prize Nominee) and Pavan Varma (author of Being Indian) in the same exhibition.

Asa Mader presented several film works at Le Laboratoire in Paris in a joint exhibit with photographer and photojournalist James Nachtwey, subject of the Academy Award-nominated documentary War Photographer. The exhibit entitled Combat pour la vie / Struggle for Life consists of a series of original photographs bearing witness to James Nachtwey’s work in Siberia, Asia and Africa, and to initiatives in the fight against AIDS, tuberculosis and other infectious diseases. Asa created film portraits of four of the leading medical scientists in this field as well as an installation/portrait of the photographer James Nachtwey.

Asa Mader directed the music video "Violet Hill", the first single of Coldplay's album Viva la Vida or Death and All His Friends. The music video was nominated for Best UK Video and Best Special Effects in a Video at the 2008 MTV Video Music Awards and Best Video at the Q Awards

Asa Mader worked in collaboration with choreographer Benjamin Millepied on a dance (and film) piece entitled Years Later, commissioned and performed by Mikhail Baryshnikov. The piece was previewed on April 14, 2009, at the Baryshnikov Arts Center's Spring Gala in New York and premiered in Riga, Latvia on May 2, 2009. In homage to the birthday of Mikhail Baryshnikov, a short film portrait by Asa Mader was presented on NOWNESS on January 27, 2012.

Asa Mader's more recent collaboration with Benjamin Millepied resulted in the short film Time Doesn't Stand Still, starring Léa Seydoux. It features an original soundtrack by composer (and longtime David Lynch-collaborator) Angelo Badalamenti. A short teaser of the film was previewed on the website NOWNESS in December 2010. The completed version of the film was released in 2011.

In 2012, Asa Mader was invited by the Deauville American Film Festival for a writing residency and to work on a film based on a book of William Dean Howells. He also showcased Ray of Life an immersive film experience starring Carmen Kass during Pitti Uomo in Florence, Italy. Ray of Life utilized 3D panoramic and holographic projections and was developed with fashion brand Jay Ahr and technology company Dassault Systèmes.

In 2013, Asa Mader's feature documentary project In The Shadow of the Dream, a portrait of Clarence Benjamin Jones, one of Dr. Martin Luther King Jr.’s trusted allies, was presented at Independent Filmmaker Project's Spotlight on Documentaries in New York. The project was subsequently presented at the 2014 Hot Docs Forum in Toronto.

In 2014, Asa Mader teamed up with filmmakers Arthur Jafa and Kahlil Joseph to produce the feature-length documentary Dreams Are Colder Than Death, a haunted cinematic meditation on the question: "what does it mean to be black in America in the 21st century?" The film was co-produced with ZDF/Arte and premiered at the 52nd New York Film Festival, the Los Angeles Film Festival and received the Best Documentary Feature Award at BlackStar Film Festival.

== Filmography ==
=== Feature films ===
- Dreams Are Colder Than Death (2014)
- In The Shadow of the Dream (2013)

=== Films for TV ===
- Pigalle with Lou Doillon (2006)
- Little Italy: Wiseguys, Bullets, Backrooms (2005)

=== Short films ===
- Time Doesn't Stand Still (2011)
- La Maladie de la Mort/The Malady of Death (2003)

=== Music videos ===
- "Violet Hill" by Coldplay (2008)
