= Anna Mouglalis =

French actress (born 1978)

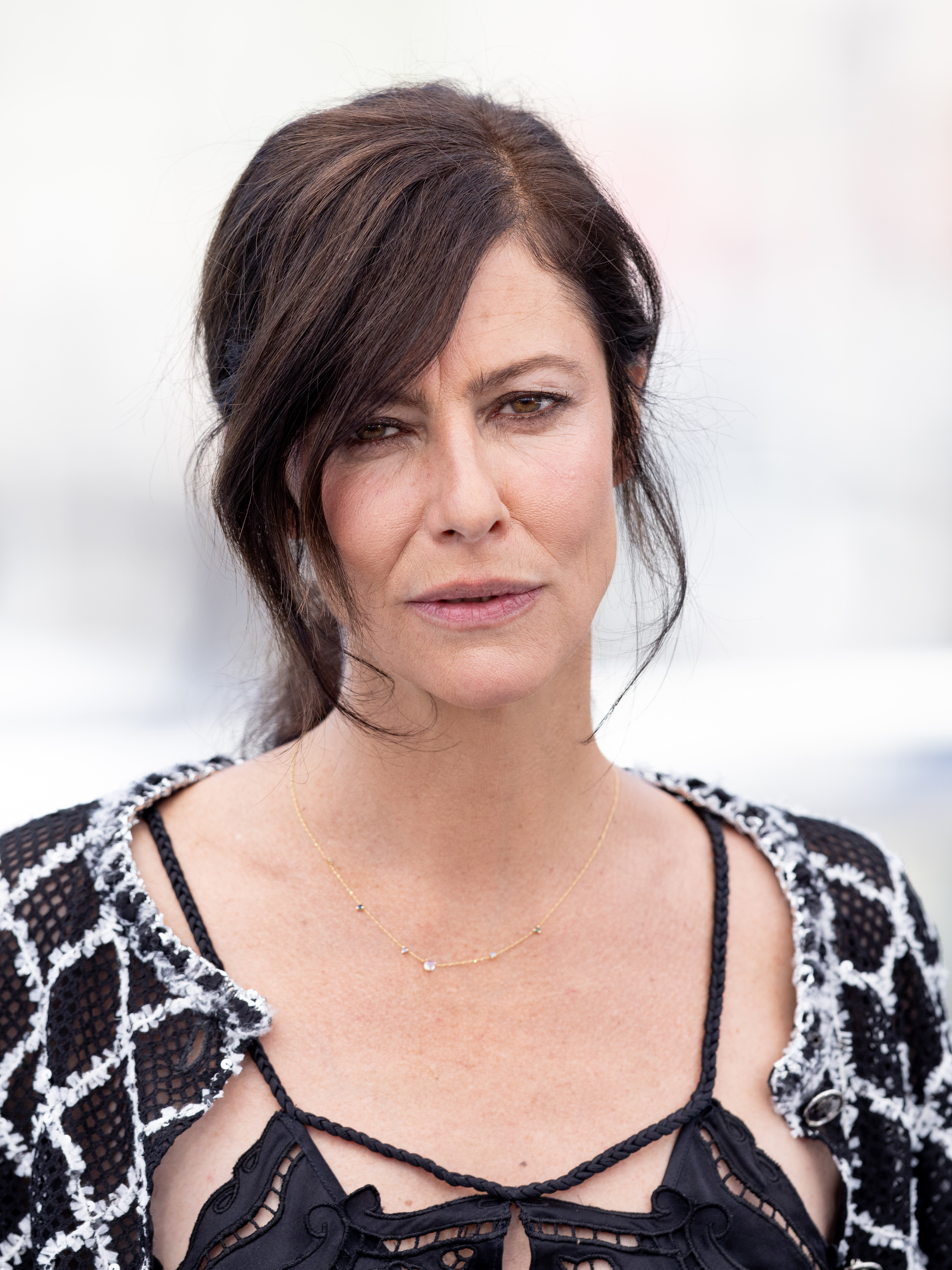
- Mouglalis in 2025
- Born: 26 April 1978 (age 48); Fréjus, Var, France
- Occupations: Actress; model
- Years active: 1997–present
- Spouse: Vincent Raes (m. 2013; div. 2014)
- Partner: Samuel Benchetrit (2005–2012)
- Children: 1

Anna Mouglalis (French pronunciation: [ana muɡlalis]; Greek: Άννα Μουγλάλη; born 26 April 1978) is a French actress and model. She is known for being a house ambassador for Chanel since 2002, and for portraying the fashion designer Coco Chanel in the 2009 film Coco Chanel & Igor Stravinsky, and actress Paula Maxa in the 2018 film The Most Assassinated Woman in the World.

== Life and career ==
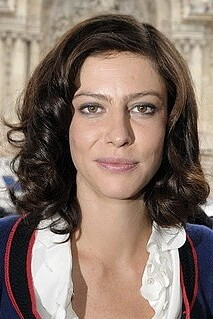
Mouglalis in 2010

Mouglalis was born in Fréjus, Var, to a French mother and a Greek father. She spent her youth in the Var département, before moving to Nantes with her family. Her father is a doctor and her mother is a physical therapist.

Until 2001 Mouglalis studied at the Conservatoire National Supérieur d'Art Dramatique de Paris (CNSAD) under the direction of Daniel Mesguich. In addition to her native French, she speaks fluent English, Italian, and Spanish, and understands Greek to a limited extent.

In 1997, she had begun an acting career in La Nuit du Titanic, played in Paris. In the same year she was chosen by Francis Girod for the film Terminal. In 2000, she co-starred with Isabelle Huppert in Claude Chabrol's Merci pour le chocolat. After appearing in Novo (2002) by Jean Pierre Limosin, she was cast by Roberto Andò for the thriller Sotto falso nome. In 2003, she played in La Maladie de la mort, a film in black and white by first-time director Asa Mader, which previewed at the Venice Film Festival. In this same year, she co-starred in a Greek film, called Real Life (Alithini Zoi), directed by Panos Koutras. In 2005, she took part in two Italian movies: Romanzo criminale, directed by Michele Placido, and Mare buio, where she was featured alongside Luigi Lo Cascio.

In a TV movie called Les Amants du Flore and directed by Ilan Duran Cohen, Mouglalis played Simone de Beauvoir, with Jean-Paul Sartre played by co-star Lorànt Deutsch. Together they had a great public and critical triumph. Critics praised their portrayals of these literary figures, showing their romance and the birth of their careers.

Along with her career as an actress, Mouglalis began a successful modelling career. In 2002, she was chosen by Karl Lagerfeld for the ad campaign for the Amateur Allure de Chanel perfume. He used her as one of his "muses," promoting Chanel bags, fine jewelry, and watches.

Mouglalis was cast as Coco Chanel in the 2009 film Coco Chanel & Igor Stravinsky, directed by Jan Kounen. The film was chosen to close the 2009 Cannes Film Festival.

In 2018, she portrayed French actress Paula Maxa in the Netflix film The Most Assassinated Woman in the World.

== Personal life ==
On 7 March 2007, she gave birth to her first child, a daughter named Saul, whom she had with French director Samuel Benchetrit.

In February 2024, she joined actresses Judith Godrèche and Isild Le Besco in accusing Jacques Doillon of sexual misconduct, claiming that he forcefully kissed her in the summer of 2011 when Benchetrit was appearing in Doillon's film Un enfant de toi.

== Filmography ==
=== Actress ===
Year	Title	Role	Director	Notes
1998	Terminale	Claire	Francis Girod	
2000	Merci pour le chocolat	Jeanne Pollet	Claude Chabrol	
2000	La Captive	Isabelle	Chantal Akerman	
2000	De l'histoire ancienne	The nurse	Orso Miret	
2002	Novo	Irène	Jean-Pierre Limosin	
2002	La Vie nouvelle	Melania	Philippe Grandrieux	
2002	The Wolf of the West Coast	Mai	Hugo Santiago	
2003	Playing 'In the Company of Men'	Ophélie	Arnaud Desplechin	
2003	The Malady of Death	The woman	Asa Mader	Short
2004	Strange Crime	Milla	Roberto Andò	
2004	Real Life	Joy Martinokosta	Panos H. Koutras	
2004	En attendant le déluge	Milena	Damien Odoul	
2005	Romanzo Criminale	Patrizia	Michele Placido	Cabourg Film Festival - Best New Actress; Nominated - Italian Online Movie Award for Best Cast
2005	To oneiro tou Ikarou	Priest's Wife	Costa Natsis	
2006	Mare nero	Veronica	Roberta Torre	
2006	Les Amants du Flore	Simone de Beauvoir	Ilan Duran Cohen	TV movie
2007	J'ai toujours rêvé d'être un gangster	Suzy	Samuel Benchetrit	
2009	Coco Chanel & Igor Stravinsky	Coco Chanel	Jan Kounen	
2010	Gainsbourg: A Heroic Life	Juliette Gréco	Joann Sfar	
2010	Mammuth	The disabled	Benoît Delépine & Gustave de Kervern	
2011	Chez Gino	Simone Roma	Samuel Benchetrit	
2011	L'angle mort	Pierra	Florence Benoist	Short
2012	Kiss of the Damned	Xenia	Xan Cassavetes	
2012	Photo	Elisa	Carlos Saboga	
2013	Jealousy	Claudia	Philippe Garrel	
2013	Reason	Clement Belrose	Bruno Ilogti	Short
2014	Leopardi	Fanny Targioni-Tozzetti	Mario Martone	
2014	Un voyage	Mona	Samuel Benchetrit (3)	
2015	Anna	Anna	Charles-Olivier Michaud	
2015	Pluie d'été	Agathe	Cyril de Gasperis	Short
2015	L'homme de l'île Sandwich	Lio's mother	Levon Minasian	Short
2016	Split	Anja	Deborah Kampmeier	
2016	Republican Gangsters (Baron Noir)	Amélie Dorendeu	Ziad Doueiri	TV series (8 episodes); Nominated - ACS Award for Best Actress (2016); Nominated - ACS Award for Best Actress (2018)
2018	The Most Assassinated Woman in the World	Paula Maxa	Franck Ribiére	
2019	My Little One	Jade	Frédéric Choffat and Julie Gilbert	
2021	The Salamander	Aude	Alex Carvalho	
2021	Happening	Mme Rivière	Audrey Diwan	
2022	En même temps	Madame Béquet	Benoît Delépine & Gustave Kervern	
2024	Across the Sea (La Mer au loin)	Noémie	Saïd Hamich Benlarbi	
2025	Mickey 17	Creepers' leader (voice)	Bong Joon-ho	
TBA	Dalloway †	TBA	Yann Gozlan	Filming

=== Director / Writer ===
Year	Title	Notes
2009	X Femmes	TV series (1 episode)

== Theater ==
Year	Title	Author	Director	Notes
1997	La Nuit du Titanic	Michel Pascal	Michel Pascal	Théâtre Rive-Gauche
1999	Spring Awakening	Frank Wedekind	Michel Pascal (2)	Tour
2003	The Country	Martin Crimp	Louis-Do de Lencquesaing	Théâtre de l'Œuvre
2004	HEROINE	Asa Mader	Asa Mader	Castello Maniace
