= James Nachtwey =

American photojournalist

- James Nachtwey, 24 March 2011
- Born: Syracuse, New York, US
- Occupation: Photojournalist
- Website: jamesnachtwey.com

James Nachtwey is an American photojournalist and war photographer.

He has been awarded the Overseas Press Club's Robert Capa Gold Medal five times and two World Press Photo awards. In 2003, Nachtwey was injured in a grenade attack on his convoy while working in Baghdad, from which he made a full recovery.

Nachtwey has worked with Time as a contract photographer since 1984. He worked for Black Star (1980–1985), was a member of Magnum Photos (1986–2001) and VII Photo Agency (2001–2011) where he was a founding member.

== Life and work ==
Nachtwey grew up in Massachusetts and graduated from Dartmouth College, where he played rugby and studied art history and political science (1966–70).

He started working as a newspaper photographer in 1976 at the Albuquerque Journal. In 1980, he moved to New York City and began working as a freelance photographer. In 1981, he covered his first assignment in Northern Ireland illustrating civil strife. He has documented a variety of armed conflicts and social issues, spending time in South Africa, Latin America, the Middle East, Russia, Eastern Europe, the former Soviet Union shooting pictures of war, conflict and images of socio-political issues in Western Europe and the United States. He is not married and currently lives in New York City.

In 1994, Nachtwey was covering the upcoming elections in South Africa, the first non-racial ones in decades. As an associate of the Bang-Bang Club, he was at the scene when Ken Oosterbroek was killed and Greg Marinovich was seriously injured.

Nachtwey had been injured previously in his work, but it was during his extensive coverage of the United States invasion of Iraq that he received his first combat injury. As Nachtwey and Time correspondent Michael Weisskopf rode in the back of a Humvee with the United States Army "Tomb Raiders" Survey Platoon, an insurgent threw a grenade into the vehicle. Weisskopf grabbed the grenade to throw it out of the humvee: two soldiers were injured in the explosion, along with the Time journalists. Nachtwey managed to take several photographs of medic Billie Grimes treating Weisskopf before passing out. Both journalists were airlifted to Germany and later to hospitals in the United States. Nachtwey recovered sufficiently to return overseas to cover the tsunami in Southeast Asia of December 2004.

Nachtwey has worked with Time as a contract photographer since 1984. He worked for Black Star from 1980 until 1985 and was a member of Magnum Photos from 1986 until 2001. In 2001, he was a founding member of the VII Photo Agency (he resigned from VII in July 2011).

Nachtwey was present during the September 11, 2001 attacks on the World Trade Center, and produced a well known related body of work. He also compiled a photo essay on the effects of the Sudan conflict on civilians.

In 2001, the documentary War Photographer was released, focusing on Nachtwey and his work. Directed by Christian Frei, the film received an Academy Award nomination for best documentary film.

On February 1, 2014, Nachtwey was grazed by a bullet while photographing political protests in Thailand.

Nachtwey is one of three winners of the 2007 TED Prize. Each recipient was granted $100,000 and one "world-changing wish" to be revealed at the 2007 TED conference, in Monterey, California. Many members of the TED Community, and a group of world-class companies, have pledged support to help fulfill the wishes. Nachtwey's wish, revealed March 8, 2007, is this: "There's a vital story that needs to be told, and I wish for TED to help me gain access to it and then to help me come up with innovative and exciting ways to use news photography in the digital era." Those who wish to help him will sign a Non-disclosure agreement (NDA) and help him "gain access to a place in the world where a critical situation is occurring and fully document it with photography; set a date to unveil the pictures and find a series of innovative ways to create powerful impact with them, using novel display technologies and the power of the Internet as well as media; and use the campaign to generate resources for organizations that are working to address and transform the situation." Early results of this work have been unveiled at XDRTB.org to document extensively drug-resistant tuberculosis throughout the world.

== Awards ==
- 1983: Robert Capa Gold Medal from the Overseas Press Club
- 1984: Robert Capa Gold Medal from the Overseas Press Club
- 1986: Robert Capa Gold Medal from the Overseas Press Club
- 1993: World Press Photo of the Year
- 1994: Robert Capa Gold Medal from the Overseas Press Club
- 1995: World Press Photo of the Year
- 1998: Robert Capa Gold Medal from the Overseas Press Club
- 1999: Honorary Fellowship of The Royal Photographic Society.
- 2001: Academy Award nomination for best documentary film for War Photographer (2001), directed by Christian Frei.
- 2003: Dan David Prize from the Dan David Foundation and Tel Aviv University. An award of US$1 million for the "Present – Print & electronic media" theme, shared with Frederick Wiseman.
- 2006: 12th Annual Heinz Award in Arts and Humanities from The Heinz Family Foundation, including a prize of US$250,000.
- 2007: One of three winners of the 2007 TED Prize.
- 2012: Dresden Peace Prize
- 2016: Princess of Asturias Award for Communication and Humanities
- 2017 Induction into the International Photography Hall of Fame and Museum
- 2019: Golden Plate Award of the American Academy of Achievement

== Exhibitions ==
- Bibliothèque nationale de France, Paris, 2002–2003.
- Struggle For Life, Le Laboratoire, Paris, 2008. Documented the human toll of TB and AIDS, with text by Dr. Anne Goldfeld, with work from Cambodia, Thailand, Africa and Siberia. Accompanied by film portraits of Nachtwey and several medical scientists participating in the Attention! Symposium by American filmmaker Asa Mader.
- Memoria, Maison européenne de la photographie, Paris, 2017.
- Memoria, Fotografiska Stockholm, 2019.
- Memoria, Fotografiska New York, 2022.
- Memoria, Bangkok, 2023.
- Featured artist in 15 Fotografiska Years at Fotografiska Stockholm, 2025
- Memoria, Fotografiska Berlin, 2026.
- Photography in Power (group exhibition), Fotografiska Tallinn, Estonia, 2026.
