= Space Tourists =

2009 film by Christian Frei

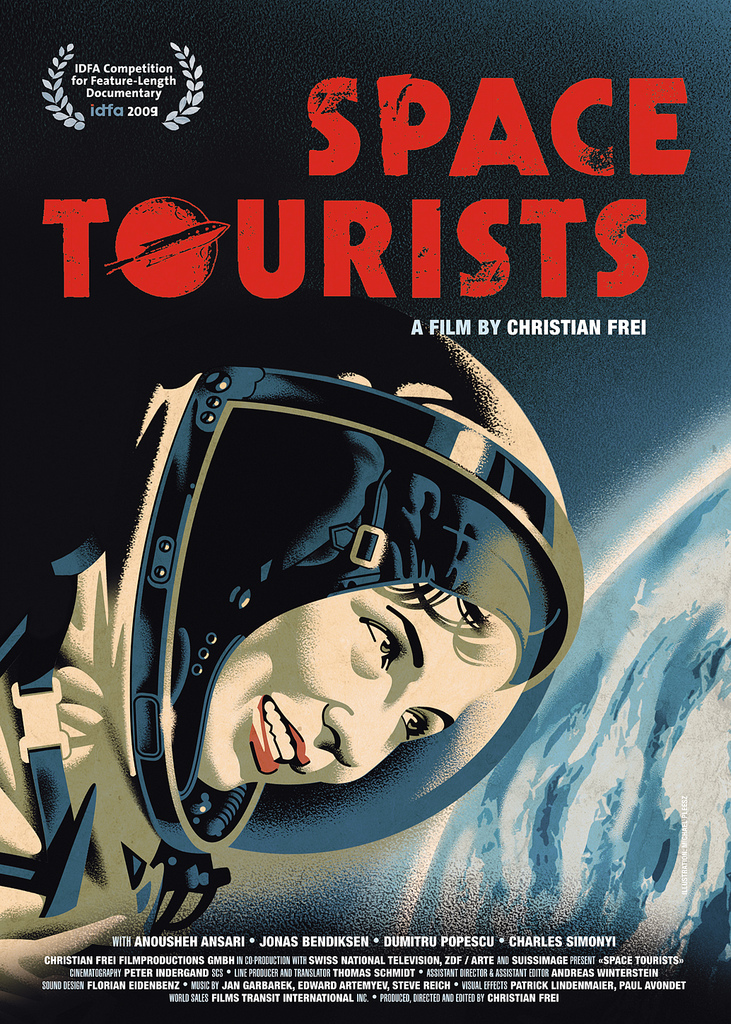
- Space Tourists movie poster
- Directed by: Christian Frei
- Produced by: Christian Frei
- Starring: Anousheh Ansari; Jonas Bendiksen; Dumitru Popescu; Charles Simonyi
- Cinematography: Peter Indergand
- Edited by: Christian Frei
- Music by: Edward Artemyev; Jan Garbarek; Steve Reich
- Release date: November 20, 2009 (IDFA Festival)
- Running time: 98 minutes
- Country: Switzerland
- Languages: Russian, English, Romanian

Space Tourists is a feature-length documentary of the Swiss director Christian Frei. The film had its premiere at the Zurich Film Festival in 2009 and has won the "World Cinema Directing Award" at the Sundance Film Festival in 2010.

== Plot ==
The documentary juxtaposes the journeys of extremely rich tourists traveling with the astronauts into space with the poor Kazakh metal collectors risking their lives in search for rocket waste fallen down into the plains once the rocket has left. Critics acclaimed this film for its breathtaking imagery and richness of insights.

The film accompanies the first female space traveler who was not a space agency employee, Anousheh Ansari, who paid US$20 million for her flight into space.

The film shows the poor Kazakh metal collectors risking their lives in search for rocket waste that falls literally from the sky. The film features Magnum photographer Jonas Bendiksen, who has followed these metal collectors for a long time. Charles Simonyi, chief developer of Word and Excel, is seen at his space training and at his tasting of space food. Another protagonist of the film is Dumitru Popescu, CEO of ARCA Space Corporation, an aerospace enthusiast who applied at the Google Lunar X-Prize of the X-Prize Foundation, founded by Anousheh Ansari.

== Reception ==
Christopher Campbell wrote on the official bloc of DOC: The Documentary Channel:

Frei’s methods of telling these interconnected stories tied to modern spaceflight is fittingly of a revolving nature, and in the end we’re back to a beginning of sorts with a look at the training ground for the next tourists, in Star City, Russia. There aren’t too many straight interviews in the film nor is there a lot of direct exposition, although Ansari, Bendiksen and Popescu contribute some voiceover narration to their sections. It’s a bumpy and winding trip but worth it every moment. And while you aren’t going to know exactly what it’s like to go to outer space in the end, you’ll have taken a virtual tour through as much of the inner and outer workings of what’s involved in modern space travel as you can possibly get from an entertaining, enlightening documentary film.

Brad Balfour of the Huffington Post emphasizes that the film brings together the two sides of the medal:

Frei follows Iranian-American multimillionaire Anousheh Ansari as she undergoes ersatz cosmonaut training en route to becoming the world's first female space tourist. She herself is armed with a camera, and her footage on board the International Space Station is some of the most intimate, breathtaking imagery we will ever see from outer space. As Ansari launches into orbit, Kazakh villagers gather the precious scrap metal from the jettisoned rockets, while a Romanian space enthusiast works on his own low-tech model to launch. The 98-minute chronicle suggests that while the pomp and pageantry of the space program may have died out with the 20th century, the human mysteries have only deepened.

Ryan L. Kobrick, author from the magazine The Space Review liked the authenticity of the film:

The documentary follows a group of metal salvagers on their journey to recover falling rocket stages that they fetch to sell the aluminum and titanium to China. This footage is so rare that it makes this movie a must-see for anyone in the space industry and anyone with an interest in cultural and historical impacts of space on small communities. Overall the movie had excellent contrasts between life on the ISS and workers in Kazakhstan and how in some cases they depend on each other in a strange symbiotic relationship. Another movie highlight was the old Russian space folk music used in the background that showed how deep into the culture space had once penetrated. The story did jump around a lot and perhaps stretched out too much in some parts, but getting to see such unique and rare footage was fantastic.

== Awards and festivals ==
- DOC: The Documentary Channel 2012: Jury Prize «Best of Doc»
- Cervino Cine Mountain International Mountain Film Festival 2011: Miglior Grand Prix dei Festival 2011
- Beldocs Belgrad 2010: Best Photography Award
- Regio Fun Film Festival Katowice 2010: 2nd Award Documentary Film Competition
- European Documentary Film Festival Oslo 2010: Eurodok Award
- Sundance Film Festival Park City 2010: World Cinema Directing Award
- EBS International Documentary Film Festival Seoul 2010: Special Jury Prize
- Swiss Film Prize 2010: Nomination for the "Best documentary"
- International Documentary Film Festival Amsterdam IDFA 2009: Official Selection.
