= Innsbruck Nature Film Festival =

Film festival in Innsbruck, Austria

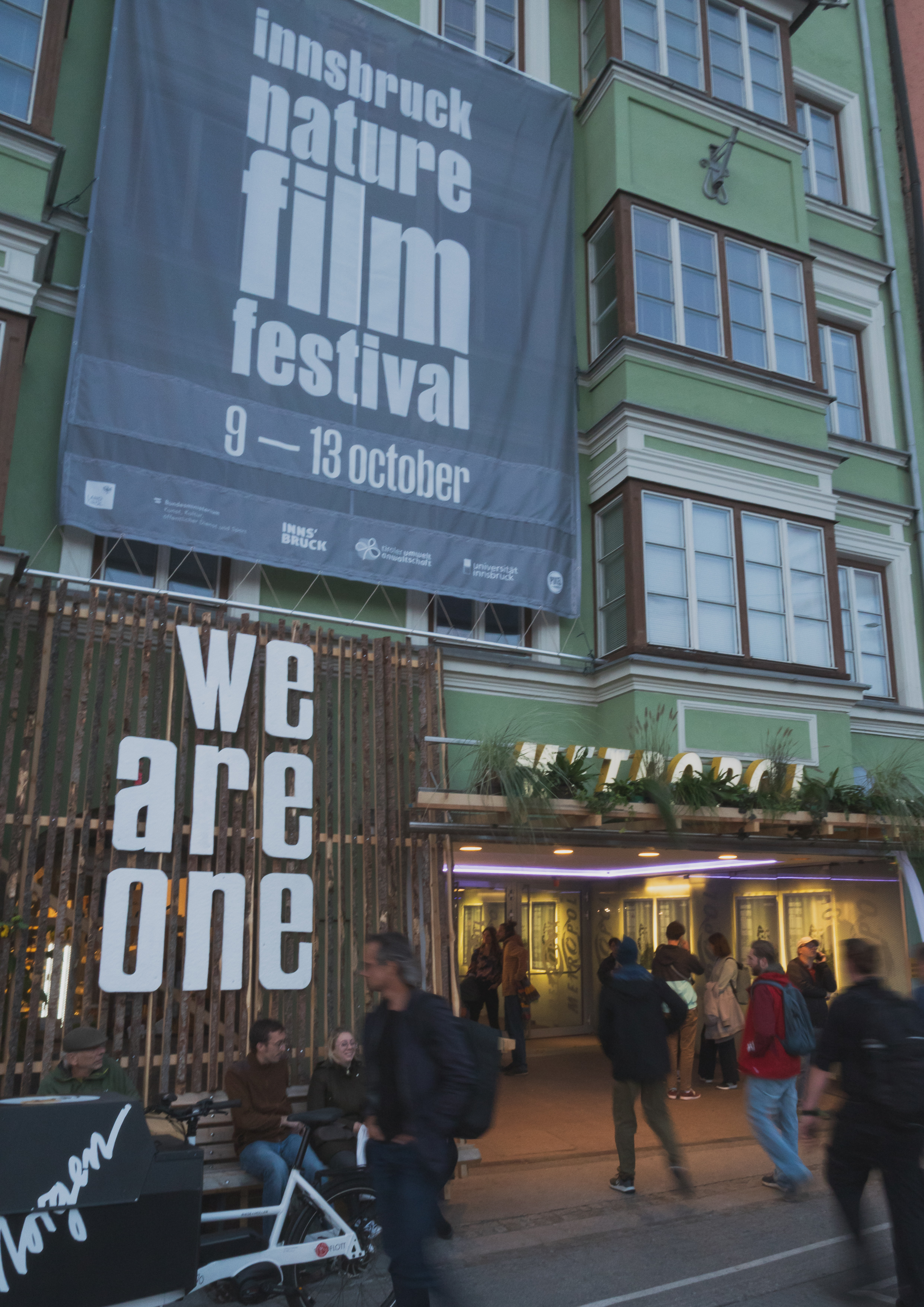
Facade of the Metropol Cinema during the innsbruck nature film festival in 2024

The Innsbruck Nature Film Festival (INFF) is an annual film competition focusing on nature, environment, and sustainability. Based in Innsbruck, Austria, it was founded in 2002 by the Tyrolean Environmental Ombudsman, Johannes Kostenzer. In 2013, the festival transitioned from local nature film days to an internationally oriented competition. In 2025, the festival attracted more than 13,000 visitors who participated in various event formats, including film screenings, discussion panels, and supporting programs.

== Film festival ==
Since its inception, the INFF has evolved from a regional event to an internationally recognized competition. The organizer of the festival is the non-profit association Nature Festival.

The festival is an IMDb-qualifying event, showcasing films, documentaries, animations, and reports on nature, sustainability, and environmental issues. Each year, approximately 60 curated films are presented, with local and international filmmakers and experts participating in Q&A sessions and panel discussions. The program includes films with broad appeal as well as specialized niche productions. Many films celebrate their Austrian premieres at the INFF, with some even having their European and world premieres, such as Animal Pride and Greina in 2024.

== Film competition ==
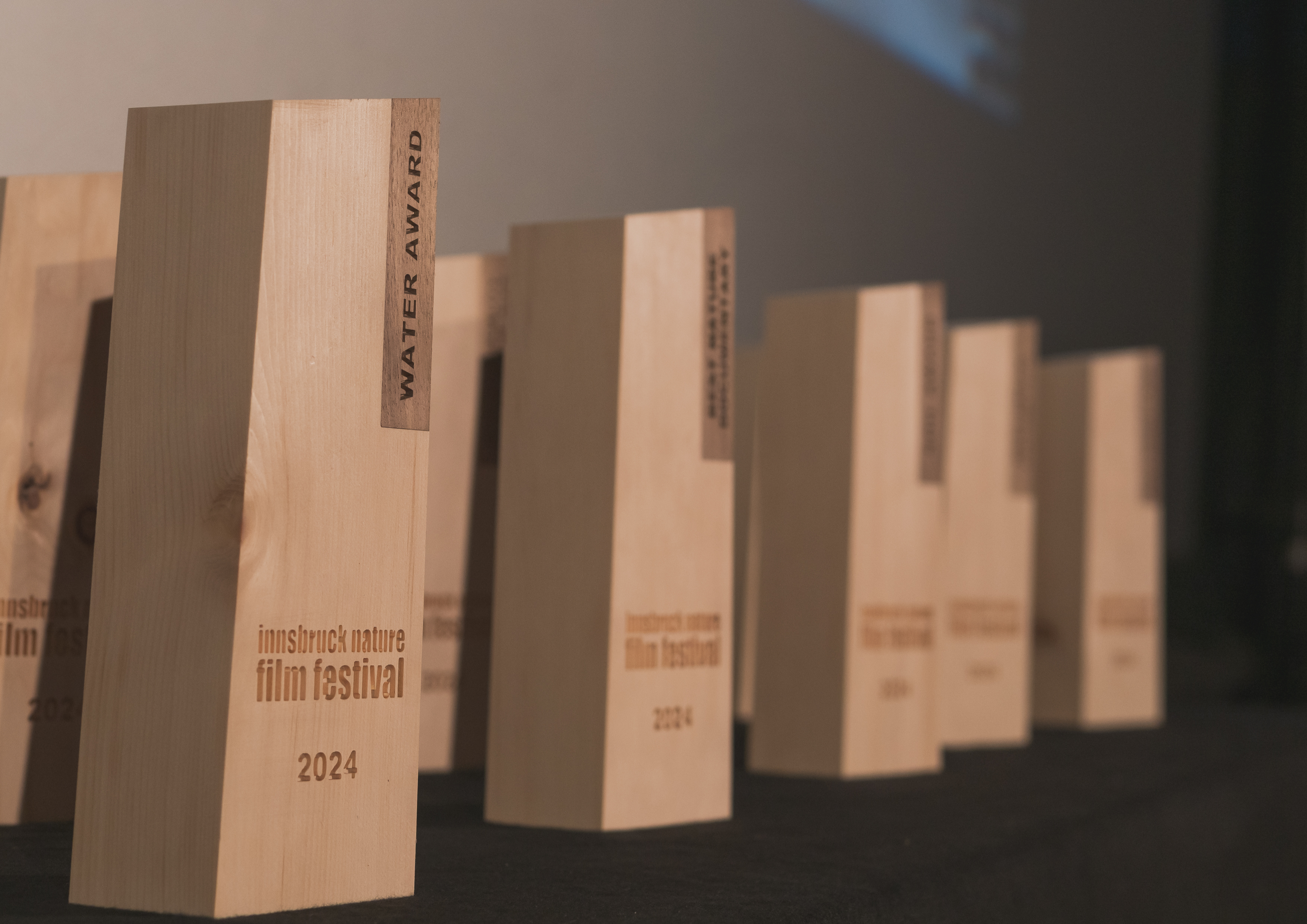
Awards of the innsbruck nature film festival

The competition receives numerous film submissions from various countries annually, with entries from over 107 nations in recent years. An international jury selects winners in several categories. This jury regularly consists of esteemed person from the film industry and the environmental sector, such as Mariette Rissenbeek, former managing director of the Berlin International Film Festival; Christian Berger, director and Oscar-nominated cinematographer; Oliver Goetzl, German wildlife filmmaker; Diana Garlytska, regional vice-chair for Western Europe of the IUCN Commission on Education and Communication and Niobe Thompson, Emmy®-Award winning Canadian filmmaker and producer.

The festival awards films in the following categories:

- Best Nature Documentary
- Best Environmental Documentary
- Best Green Fiction Film
- Best Green Fiction Short Film
- Best Animation Short Film
- Best Short4Kids

Special awards focus on thematic areas such as biodiversity, water, living in the Alps, respecting mountains or soil. Additional honors, like the Wild Women Award and the Christian Berger Cinematography Award, recognize outstanding achievements by female directors, cinematographers, or in visual storytelling. The total prize money amounts to €27,000.

== Complementary program during the festival week ==
=== Nature experiences ===
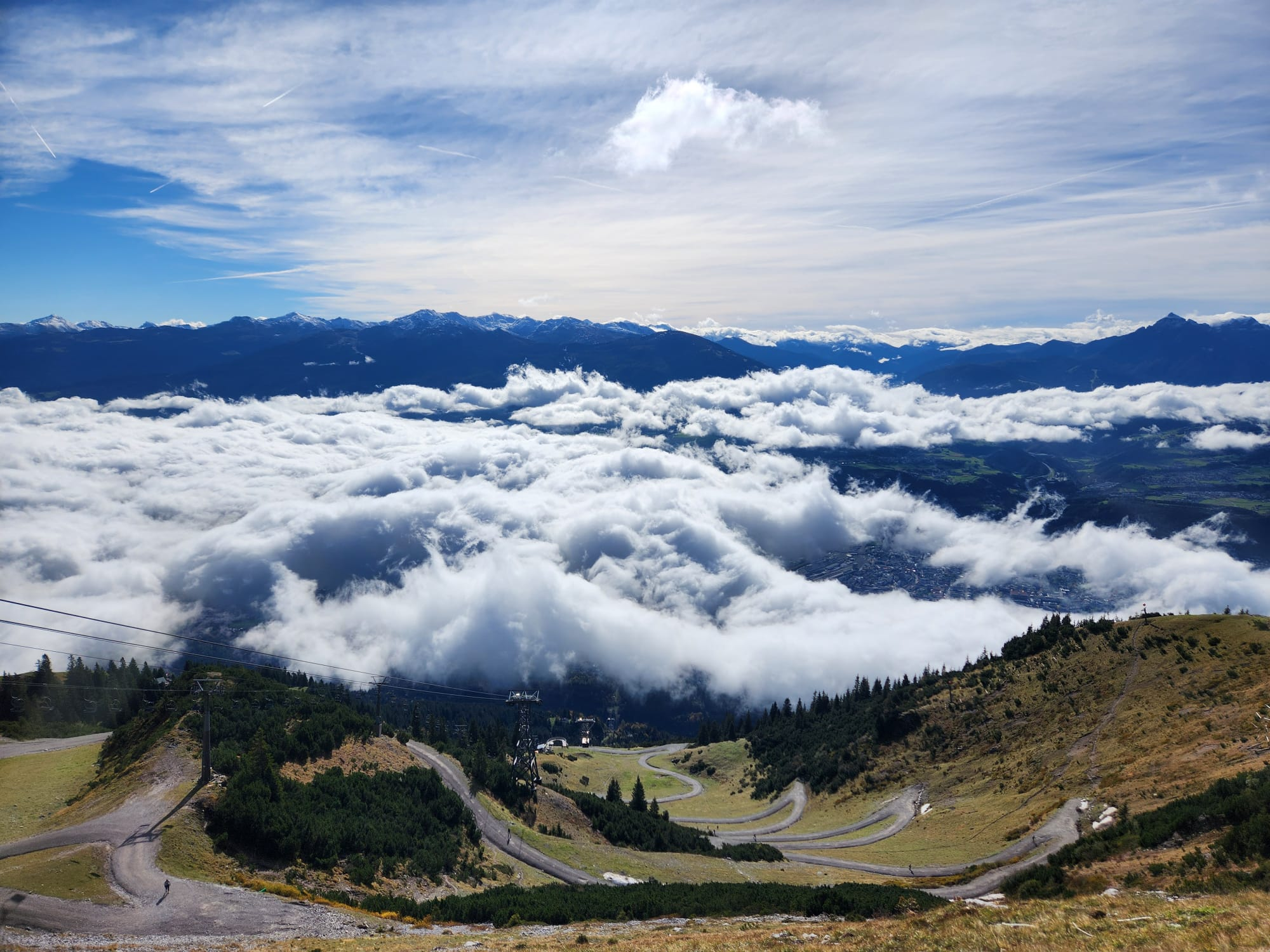
Föhn Excursion at Karwendel Nature Park

The main venue of the festival is the Metropol Cinema in Innsbruck. In addition to film screenings, a thematic exhibition is held annually in the cinema's foyer—for example, the 2024 exhibition on soil, developed in collaboration with the State of Tyrol. The program aims to provide visitors with a multisensory approach to current environmental topics. At the INFF visitor desk and the Directors’ Café in the cinema foyer, attendees can engage in discussions.

A central component of the supporting program is the Experiences, an offering open to all interested parties. This format includes interactive workshops, guided tours, multimedia installations, and themed activities that provide practical access to environmental and sustainability topics. The goal is to engage visitors who may not plan a formal festival visit, offering them the opportunity to explore current environmental issues in a relaxed atmosphere. Highlights include the annual Föhn excursion on the Nordkette, the Zum Kuckuck open-mic sessions in collaboration with Patagonia, guided nature hikes in the Karwendel Nature Park, and in 2023, a focus on night nature experiences in cooperation with Dark Sky International, whose director, Ruskin Hartley, was a guest at the INFF.

=== Educational initiatives ===
INFF collaborates with local schools and the University of Innsbruck to offer dynamic learning experiences during the festival. These include curated film screenings on environmental issues, interactive Q&A sessions with filmmakers, and expert-led seminars in ecology and environmental science. In partnership with Natopia, a nature education organization, INFF also hosts school screenings to inspire young audiences. Science Glimpses further enrich the program by integrating scientific research with film narratives, deepening understanding of environmental topics.

=== Industry meeting ===
The festival also serves as a meeting place for filmmakers, television executives, and production companies. In addition to seminars and workshops, other events such as scientific lectures, networking events, and guided expeditions are offered to promote professional exchange. Since 2023, a special B2B segment called "Cineleaves" has been established, focusing on networking between the film and publishing industries.

=== Art and film ===
A particular focus of the INFF is the connection between art and film. As part of the Green Arthouse series, films offering new narrative approaches to environmental topics are showcased. In 2024, Austrian artist and environmental activist Edgar Honetschläger opened the festival with a performance on insects and presented his film Midas Ants. Additionally, Colombian photographer Nicolas Valentin exhibited a gallery of large-format insect photographs.

== International networking ==
The festival positions itself as a European platform for exchange among filmmakers, production companies, and broadcasters. The INFF collaborates with the Alpine Convention, is a member of the Green Film Network and cooperates with the IUCN Commission on Education and Communication. In 2024, Festival Director Johannes Kostenzer received the IUCN CEC West Europe Award for his contributions to nature education.

== Outreach program year-round ==
To reach audiences beyond traditional festival venues, several outreach formats have been developed:

=== Campus Cinema ===
Campus Cinema is a collaboration between the INFF and the University of Innsbruck. Festival films are screened at the university and followed by discussions with experts from fields such as microbiology, ethnology, ecology, and geography. Films like Outgrow the System and the award-winning Kosmos Erde – Planet Soil were shown in this context.

=== INFF on tour ===
Through INFF on tour mini-film festivals are organized in various Tyrolean communities. These events combine film screenings with expert panels, workshops, and other interactive elements. In just two years, 20 events were held in ten communities, such as the Ötztal Nature Park, Pettneu am Arlberg, and the Karwendel Nature Park, attracting over 1,600 visitors in 2024. The aim is to promote access to cultural and environmental education offerings, especially in rural and peripheral regions.

=== INFF en voyage ===
With INFF en voyage the festival program is expanded internationally. In October 2024, the INFF engaged in the Regional Conservation Forum of the IUCN in Brugge with Short-Films and one Feature length film as well as in the Austrian Cultural Week in Muscat, Oman, with four Austrian productions over the course of four days – featuring dedicated screenings for adults and kids. The initiative continued with the festival’s Asian debut, the INFF en voyage in Manila, held from 30 November to 2 December 2025 at the SM Mall of Asia Cinema, featuring free screenings of award-winning Austrian productions. The Manila edition was organized in cooperation with the Austrian Embassy in Manila and local partners, introducing Filipino audiences to themes of biodiversity, conservation, and sustainability.

== Food on Film EU project ==
The INFF is also a cooperation partner in the EU-funded project Food on Film. As part of this project, since the fall semester of 2024, school classes from five European countries (Italy, Austria, Germany, France, and Montenegro) - 19 classes in Austria - have been exploring urgent issues related to nutrition, food production, and the environment, creating film scripts that will be turned into one-minute short films. The project provides teachers and schools with a modern, digital, and interactive educational film format, granting access to numerous international and national environmental films, documentaries, and scientific materials. All that is needed for production is a smartphone and creative ideas.

In each participating country two classes with the best scripts rewarded with a two-day film workshop to professionally finalize their short films. All films produced by the students were showcased at the Mobile Film Festival in Paris, and at the innsbruck nature film festival in October 2025.

== Awarded films (selection) ==
Awarded films
Year	Category	Film
2013		Schnee by August Pflugfelder
2014	Best Documentary	Virunga by Orlando von Einsiedel
2015	Best Nature Documentary	Yellowstone by Oliver Goetzl and Ivo Nörenberg and
2015	Best Environmental Documentary	Banking Nature by Sandrine Feydel and Denis Delestrac
2016	Best Nature Documentary	Light on Earth by Joe Loncraine
2016	Best Environmental Documentary	Jumbo Wild by Nick Waggoner
2017	Best Nature Documentary	Dusk Chorus by Nika Saravanja and Allesandro D’Emilia
2017	Best Environmental Documentary	The Last Pig by Allison Argo
2018	Best Nature Documentary	White Wolves - Ghosts of the Arctic by Oliver Goetzl
2018	Best Environmental Documentary	The Silver Branch by Katrina Costello and John Brown
2019	Best Nature Documentary	Sea of Shadows by Richard Ladkani
2019	Best Environmental Documentary	Welcome to Sodom by Florian Weigensamer and Christian Krönes
2020	Best Nature Documentary	Die Wiese by Jan Haft
2020	Best Environmental Documentary	Sheep Hero by Ton van Zantvoort
2021	Best Nature Documentary	The Loneliest Whale - The Search for 52 by Joshua Zeman
2021	Best Soil Film	Kiss the Ground by Josh Tickell and Rebecca Tickell
2022	Best Environmental Documentary	Wood - Der geraubte Wald by Ebba Sinzinger, Michaela Kirst and Monica Lazurean-Gorgan
2022	Best Nature Documentary	Patrick and the Whale by Mark Fletcher
2022	Wild Women Award	Taming the Garden by Salomé Jashi
2022	Best Short Film	300 Meter - Garzweiler Tagebau II by Ivo Siegler
2022	Best Soil Film	Pleistocene Park by Luke Griswold-Tergis
2022	Christian Berger Cinematography Award	Panthère des Neiges by Marie Amiguet and Vincent Munier
2022	Best Animation Short Film	L`Air de Rien – Slipping Away by Gabriel Hénot Lefèvre
2022	Best Biodiversity Film	The Seeds of Vandana Shiva by Camilla Becker and James Becket
2023	Best Environmental Documentary	The Illusion of Abundance by Erika Gonzalez Ramirez and Matthieu Lietaert
2023	Best Nature Documentary	Kaktus Hotel by Yann Sochaczewski
2023	Wild Women Award	Dead Birds Flying High / Die toten Vögel sind oben by Sönje Storm
2023	Best Short Film	Wrought by Joel Penner and Anna Sigrithur
2023	Best Short Film4Kids	Beavers above town by Yaz Ellis
2023	Best Soil Film	The Soil Saviors - Im Reich des Regenwurms by Anna Pflüger
2023	Christian Berger Cinematography Award	Sleepless Birds by Dana Melaver and Tom Claudon
2023	Best Animation Short Film	Sunflower by Natalia Chernysheva
2023	Best Mid-Length Documentary	The Dormouse Detectives - SOKO Gartenschläfer by Rosie Koch and Roland Gockel
2024	Best Environmental Documentary	Food For Profit by Giulia Innocenzi and Pablo D'Ambrosi
2024	Best Nature Documentary	Songs of Earth by Margreth Olin
2024	Best Biodiversity Film	Hunt for the oldest DNA by Niobe Thompson
2024	Wild Women Award	Catherine Barbara Marciniak for Follow the Rain
2024	Best Green Fiction Film	The Last Rhino by Guillaume Harvey
2024	Best Short Documentary	Dream to Cure Water by Ciril Jazbec
2024	Best Short Film4Kids	Animal Innsbruck by Johannes Hoffmann, Magnus Klammer, Florian Furtschegger
2024	Best Soil Film	Planet Soil – Kosmos Erde by Mark Verkerk
2024	Christian Berger Cinematography Award	Between the Rains by Moses Thuranira and Andrew H. Brown
2024	Best Quality of Life in the Alps Film	Piemont –Mit Mulis über Stock und Stein by Philipp Landauer
2024	Best Animation Short Film	On the 8th Day by Sénéchal, Massez, Debruyne, Carin, Duhautois
2024	Best Water Film	Dream to Cure Water by Ciril Jazbec
2025	Best Environmental Documentary	Searching for Amani by Nicole Gormley, Debra Aroko
2025	Best Nature Documentary	Birdsong by Kathleen Harris
2025	Best Biodiversity Film	Secrets of the Penguins by Serena Davies
2025	Wild Women Award	Natalie Zimmermann for Oceania: Journey to the Center
2025	Best Green Fiction Film	Through Rocks and Clouds by Franco García Becerra
2025	Best Short Green Fiction Film	Taxidermist by Sousan Salamat and Behzad Alavi
2025	Best Short Documentary	Tigereyes by Martina Trepczyk
2025	Best Short Film4Kids	Seeotter: Tierische Klimaschützer by Hendrik und Claudia Schmitt
2025	Best Soil Film	Soil: The World at Our Feet by Radford Nicholls
2025	Christian Berger Cinematography Award	Benjamin Bryan for Iron Winter by Kasimir Burgess
2025	Best Quality of Life in the Alps Film	Requiem in Weiss by Harry Putz
2025	Best Glacier Film	Greenland - Feeling the Heat by Lars Pfeiffer
2025	Best Animation Short Film	Black Tide by Kim Yip Tong
2025	Special Nature Jury Award	Flamingos: Life After the Meteorite by Lorenzo Hagerman
