= Sleepless in New York =

- Directed by: Christian Frei
- Written by: Christian Frei
- Produced by: Christian Frei
- Starring: Helen Fisher; Alley Scott; Michael Hariton; Rosey La Rouge
- Cinematography: Peter Indergand
- Edited by: Christian Frei
- Music by: Max Richter; Eleni Karaindrou; Giya Kancheli
- Release date: 26 April 2014 (Visions du Réel)
- Running time: 91 minutes
- Country: Switzerland
- Language: English

Sleepless in New York is a 2014 documentary film about heartbreak and how to overcome it by director and producer Christian Frei.

== Summary ==
The documentary film deals with lovesickness, often laughed off as nothing more than an affliction of adolescence. Oscar-nominated director Christian Frei and award-winning cinematographer Peter Indergand dive into the frenzied nights of three people who have recently been rejected: nights full of pain and tears, yet also of wakefulness and creativity. Anthropologist Dr. Helen Fisher reveals the processes that unfold in the brain of the lovesick. She says: "The game of love matters. It matters big time." Exploring the difficult path out of self-destructive, obsessive behavior, toward a new self, "Sleepless in New York" was promoted as "a film for those in love, out of love or looking for love."

== Press ==
Through a deft hand and a great deal of empathy, Frei is able to turn this film into something more. He’s painted a beautiful portrait of people at their most vulnerable.

— Ryan Mcneil, The Matinee

Proof that you can find beauty even in the darkest areas. It’s not the depressing look at love you may be imagining, and we’re witness to people coming through these hard times with a fiery, new spirit, and a renewed outlook on life.

— William Brownridge, The Film Reel

Sleepless in New York is able to superbly personalize those feelings of desertion and anxiety we’ve all felt after a major breakup. The filmmaker takes matters further by welcoming anthropologist Helen Fisher to introduce psychological theories that explain the hurt and why we react the way we do. Her opinions are astounding and the results she delivers are unbelievable.

— Addison Wylie, Wylie Writes Movie Reviews

== Release ==
Festivals:

- Visions du Réel International Documentary Festival Nyon 2014
- Hot Docs International Documentary Festival Canada 2014
- DOK.fest International Documentary Film Festival Munich 2014
- PLANETE + DOC Film Festival Warsaw 2014
- DOCVILLE International Documentary Film Festival Belgium 2014
- EDOC Encounters of the Other Cinema Ecuador 2014
