= Paula Maxa =

French horror actress (died 1970)

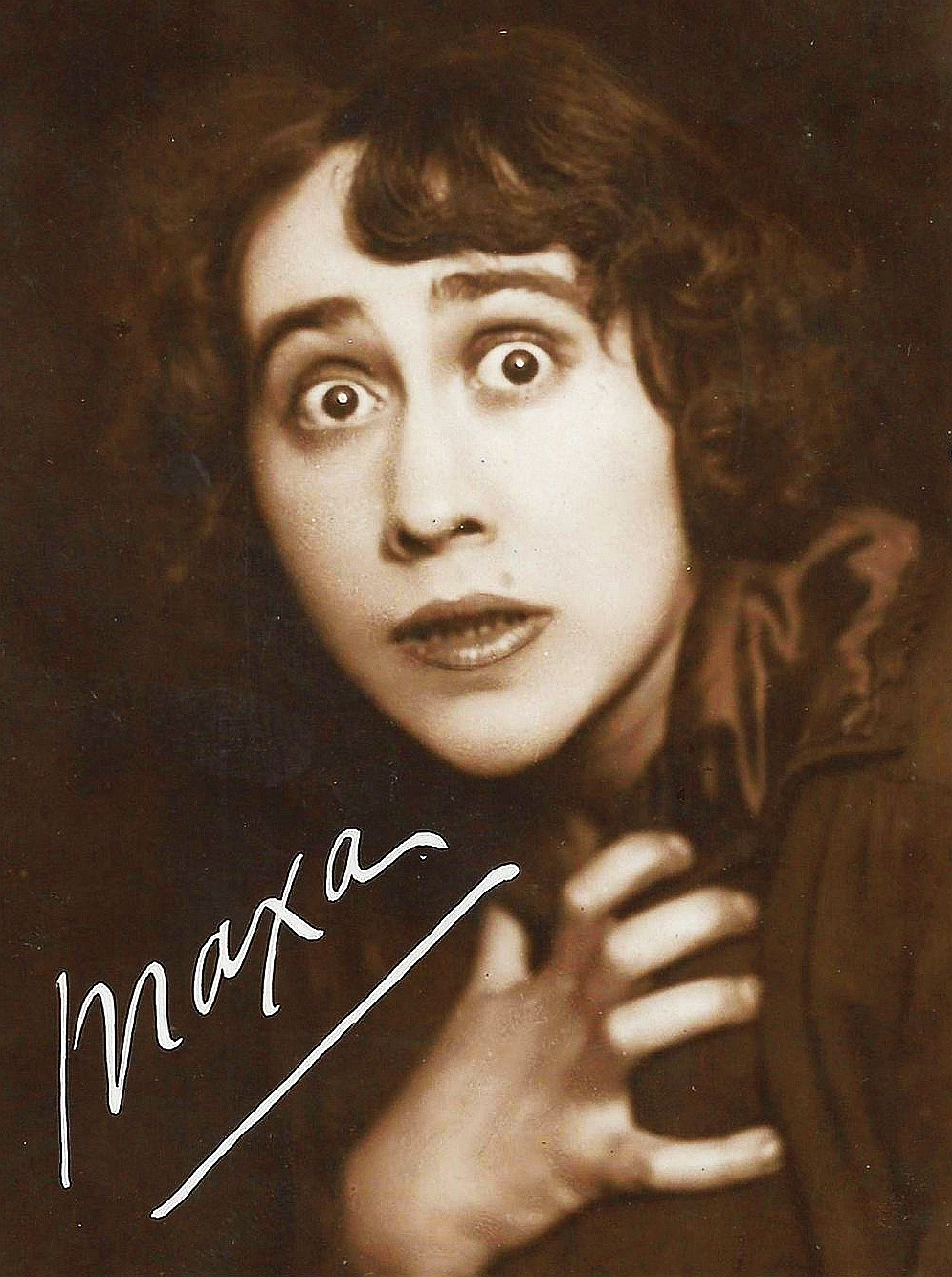
- Maxa in a postcard from between 1922 and 1926
- Born: Marie-Thérèse Beau; 1892 or 1898; Paris, France
- Died: 1970; Paris, France
- Occupation: Actress
- Organization: Grand Guignol

Paula Maxa, also known mononymously as Maxa and born Marie-Thérèse Beau (died 1970), was a French actress of stage and screen best known for her tenure as lead actress at the Grand Guignol. Much of her life is only known due to her memoir, which was published in a tabloid and is known to have been dramatized. She has been known as the "most murdered woman in the world". In an article for CrimeReads, April Snellings called her the "original scream queen". Maxa is the subject of the fictionalized biography The Most Assassinated Woman in the World, as well as other media.

== Biography ==
Crime editor April Snellings, writing for CrimeReads, said that Maxa was born in 1898, while linguist Agnès Pierron, who wrote a book on Maxa, said in Monstrum that she was born in 1892. However, it is agreed that she was born and raised in the Montmartre district of Paris, France.

Much of her early and personal life is only attested to by her 1938 autobiography. However, that autobiography, I Am The Maddest Woman in the World, written in a gossip magazine, is generally considered not entirely reliable. Her 1965 memoir, Quinze ans au "Grand-Guignol", ou la poésie de la peur, according to Snellings, is more sober in tone.

According to her 1938 autobiography, she had an idyllic childhood and well-off, old-fashioned parents. Her life changed, she said, when she was 15 years old: her 17-year-old boyfriend went into the woods with her and cut her throat. When she awoke in the hospital, she wanted to make sure he was not punished, but learned that he had committed suicide after the attack. At 16, just one year later, she married a French count, but soon left to become an actress. She is confirmed to have made her first film appearance in Les Vampires, where she played a maid.

According to her autobiography, she was soon drawn to the Grand Guignol, first as a spectator and soon as an understudy. After beginning to go on stage, she quickly became a crowd favorite and was dubbed the "Princess of Blood". She wrote that "all my following roles I had to shriek in terror, wade in blood, disembowel people, and descend to the profoundest depths of madness". According to theater historian Mel Gordon, she died more than 10,000 times in 60 different ways, including, according to one account, a leper's kiss and a two-minute decay process, the latter of which she went through more than two hundred times. This has been described as the death mechanism she was proudest of. According to Pierron, this "range of horrors" was "unique in theatrical history". She was dubbed the "most murdered woman in the world". According to her 1965 memoir, she enjoyed the gruesomeness. She also died 358 times in film. However, she stated "The realness of the theater is more powerful. Again, there is no comparison."

In her memoir, however, she recounted cheerier times, including sneaking out gooseberry jelly, used by the theater as fake blood, for use in baking. She also recounted her acting style, emphasizing exact timing that was "precise to the millimeter" and discussing an incident in which she spent more than two days to perfect a scream from off-stage.

According to her autobiography, her personal life was as dramatic as her career, and included lurid tales of prominent, well-behaved men becoming criminals out of love for her. In particular, she recounted the story of a businessman named Maurice who upon falling in love with her, turned his apartment into a "death chapel", and was convicted for a financial crime. She sold her jewelry to hire a lawyer to defend him, then became enamored with the lawyer. When Maurice was eventually released from prison, he attempted to kill her. According to that story, the lawyer had done his best to stall the case, and Maurice's new counsel easily freed him. Her memoir and autobiography both confirm that she frequently faced stalkers and death threats. According to historian Matthew Wilson Smith, she also caused a "kind of counting mania among her admirers".

She left the Grand Guignol in 1930, for disputed reasons. She claimed that the new manager forced her out due to her talent, while others claimed that she left due to her voice no longer being able to sustain the task. After leaving the Guignol, she founded her own theater, Le Théâtre du Vice et de la Vertu, and also briefly made a reappearance at the Guignol. She died of cancer at age 71 in 1970.

== Legacy ==
Snellings described Maxa as the "original scream queen". She is the subject of the 2011 biography Maxa: la femme la plus assassinée du monde, by Pierron. She is also the subject of the dramatized biography movie The Most Assassinated Woman in the World, which was released in 2018, and the subject of a short story by Carmen Maria Machado. She appears in the 2019 book Anaïs Nin in the Grand Guignol by Robert Levy. A fictionalized musical about her, Maxa, the Maddest Woman in the World, was premiered by the University of Minnesota in 2021. She was included in horror historian Alexandra Heller-Nicholas's book, 1000 Women in Horror.
