= The Most Assassinated Woman in the World =

2018 film directed by Franck Ribière

- Directed by: Franck Ribière
- Written by: James Charkow (original idea); Vérane Frédiani
- Produced by: Jean-Jacques Neira; Nicolas George; Vérane Frédiani; David Murdoch; Christophe Mazodier
- Starring: Anna Mouglalis; Niels Schneider; André Wilms; Michel Fau
- Distributed by: Netflix; Fontana (Belgium); Sinner Films (UK)
- Release date: September 7, 2018 (Worldwide)
- Running time: 102 minutes
- Country: France
- Language: French

The Most Assassinated Woman in the World (French: La femme la plus assassinée du monde) is a 2018 French mystery thriller and the debut feature film directed and produced by Franck Ribière. It stars Anna Mouglalis, Niels Schneider, Eric Godon, Sissi Duparc, André Wilms, Michel Fau. The leading lady of Grand Guignol Theatre in Paris, Paula Maxa (Anna Mouglalis), is known for being murdered in every show on stage. Someone starts to notice that there is a link between these murders and a series of murders in real life. The film is the first Belgian movie made for Netflix. It was shot in a 1.85 : 1 screen ratio through Spherical lens. It is loosely inspired by the work and life of actual French actress Paula Maxa. Filmed over the course of a month and a half on an estimated budget of €4,500,000, the film was released straight to Netflix after a premiere at the Brussels International Fantastic Film Festival in April 2018.

== Plot ==
In the early 1930s, Paula Maxa is one of the leading actresses at the Grand Guignol Theatre in Paris. Maxa is self-defined as the "most assassinated woman in the world" having become famous for being violently murdered on stage more than 10,000 times. The theater director at the Grand Guignol is known for his gruesome stories and realistic gory special effects that often leave audience members shocked and disgusted. Journalist "Jean" from Le Petit Journal is tasked with writing a critique of Maxa's performances. He arrives at the theater one night and seeks Maxa after her performance. On the way to her dressing room, he is given a bouquet of flowers by one of her costars to deliver to Maxa, apparently on behalf of one of her admirers. When he arrives in her dressing room, Maxa notices the flowers and asks him to throw them away. The two are intrigued by one another, both noting they are not what either expected of a typical journalist or actress. After Maxa leaves for her next performance, Jean begins to look around her dressing room, and notices the note attached to the flowers he brought her, which expresses her admirers love for her performances on stage, notably her deaths, and how they cannot wait to murder her in real life. Jean reads that the note is from a J. After Jean leaves, an unknown man is seen entering Paula's dressing room, and stealing the postcard on her mirror. The next morning, Paula awakes with a scream from a nightmare in which a man wearing a mask and using a cane has followed her to a café and killed her. She then has a vision of a girl in her bathtub, playing with dolls. The girl looks visibly deceased, with pale skin and blue lips. Paula takes medication, and the girl disappears. Jean is seen next at work with a stab wound on his hip. When a coworker tells Jean to have it checked by a doctor, Jean ignores him. He goes to see his boss, who asks him how his story is coming along. Although Jean wants to focus his story on the people of the theater, his boss reveals that he has been sent to investigate the link between numerous murders that have occurred in town recently and those portrayed on stage. He believes killers have been drawing inspiration from the fictitious murders for their real-life killings. Later that day, Jean goes to see Paula and asks her on a date.

Paula arrives at work the next day and continues to have visions of the same girl from the bathtub, who is now on a beach, calling out to her by the name Marie-Therèse. Paula receives a package that night containing the new dress she is to wear for her performance, with a note that reads "This is the end, I am going to kill you one final time!" from the same sender. Her date with Jean arrives and she is visibly distraught. At the same time, the unknown man from her dressing room is seen there again, this time smelling her perfume and trying on her wigs and makeup. The special effects director Paul finds the man there and asks him to leave. The man explains that he and Paul have a deal in which he delivers him dead bodies to use for the special effects in his plays, and in return he is allowed to admire Paula. He explains that he has come to finally kill her. After their date, Paula and Jean go back to her apartment. She asks him how he got the wound on his hip, and he explains that he was caught in an affair with a married woman, and her husband delivered the stab wound to him when he caught them in the bathroom. Now that he has told her his secret, he asks her what secrets she has been keeping from him. Paula reveals that her sister Aimee ran away from home when she was younger to become an actress, and they would meet in secret as to not alert their parents of her whereabouts. She tells him that during this time she began courting with a man named Jean, who had a limp and used a cane, due to a case of polio when he was younger. One day, Jean offered to take her and her sister to the beach. When they arrived at the dunes, he became violent and tried to rape Paula. As she tried to fight him, he beat her unconscious, with the last thing she remembers being him turning to rape her sister Aimee. When she awoke, Aimee's throat was slit and the man was gone. Paula reveals that she blames herself for not being able to save her sister or catch her killer, as she explains the man allegedly committed suicide before the police could arrest him. She tells Jean that she still hears the click of his cane when she is walking home at night, as though he is there. The two kiss and it is assumed that Jean spends the night at Paula's apartment.

A woman named Violette is seen at a bar, flirting with the same man from Paula's dressing room, in hopes of having sex. The man accepts her advances and the two go back to his apartment. Once there, the man tries to kill her and Violette desperately tries to escape. The man slices her throat and Violette dies. The special effects director, Paul, is seen the next morning reluctantly picking up Violette's body from the man. At Le Petit Journal, Jean's coworker tells him that Marie-Therese Beau, who is best known under her stage name Paula Maxa, was raped by a man named Jean De Lancry, who also killed her sister. Jean remembers a fan of Paula's that he met the first at the theater, named Eugene De Lancry, and connects him to the murders and the threats that Paula has received. He tells his boss that he is finished his story and uncovered the identity of the man behind the murders, but in exchange, wishes for three months salary, and two tickets to Los Angeles. Jean then rushes to the theater in an attempt to save Paula, but is confronted by the theater director Andre, who tells him that no one can save Paula, as she is his property and the property of the theater, revealing that those working in the theater are complicit in the murders. Jean is forced out into a cab by the jealous husband who swore to kill him in revenge, and he watches as Paula enters the theater, unknowingly to her death. Paula finds Paul, who has created a special effects piece for her, that will make it appear as though her throat has been sliced for tonight's appearance. During the performance, the real Jean De Lancry steps in just as Paula is to be murdered on scene, and slices her throat with a real knife. The audience at first erupts in applause, but later realize it is real blood that has spattered onto them and begin to panic. Before the paramedics find Paula's body, Paul switches the body of dead Violette with "supposedly dead" Paula's. He is arrested for the murder of Paula Maxa, and the theater closes. Paula, alive and well, is seen at the cemetery where her tomb lies with the body of Violette inside. Still at grips with visions, she calls out for Jean in between the tombs, to join her in a car. He appears to her only, pale and smiling, obviously dead. Paula leaves in the car driven by Paul. Jean De Lancry now roams the streets missing Paula, who he believes to have finally killed, and continues to murder women who resemble the actress.

== Cast ==
- Anna Mouglalis as Paula Maxa
- Niels Schneider as Jean
- Eric Godon as Georges
- Sissi Duparc as Rose
- André Wilms as Eugène
- Michel Fau as André
- Constance Dollé as Violette
- Jean-Michel Balthazar as Paul
- Michel Ferracci as Dominique
- Renaud Rutten as Louis
- Jean-Jacques Rausin as Alexandre
- Christian Crahay as Dupuis
- Vérane Frédiani as Sylviane
- Bruno Blairet as Roger

== Production ==
The film's director, Franck Ribière explained that he wished to create an authentic story that captured francophone culture. When he received the script, Ribière was intrigued by the character of Paula, who is based on real-life French actress Paula Maxa. Ribière also expressed his excitement to bring the arrival of color cinema and the first American horror films to screen. Ribière began looking for ways to create a French film to cinema through his work on his last project, Alex de la Iglesia, in which a majority of Spanish actors were cast for an authentically Spanish film. He sought out Netflix due to their success as a "new wave in film" by bringing modern stories to large audiences, and the autonomy they give to creators to tell their stories as they choose.

=== Casting ===
The film cast mostly Belgian actors for the film, of which most had backgrounds in theater and dramatic arts. Anna Mouglalis was specifically chosen for the role because of her deep voice and appearance, which Ribière said emulated the French Star Paula Maxa perfectly and helped bring the story to life.

=== Filming ===
The Most Assassinated Woman in the World was filmed over a one-month period in 2017. Most of the scenes were shot in Liège, Belgium. The film was notably praised for casting multiple Belgian actors as main characters.

== Release ==
The film was released by Netflix internationally and by Fontana in Belgium. Fontana, in partnership with Wallimage funded the project through a tax shelter, a government-approved tax incentive designed to encourage the production of audiovisual works in Belgium. The budget for the film is estimated to be €4,500,000.

== Reception ==
On Rotten Tomatoes, the film received an approval rating of 86% based on seven reviews.
