= Raving Iran =

- Directed by: Susanne Regina Meures
- Produced by: Christian Frei
- Cinematography: Gabriel Lobos, Susanne Regina Meures
- Edited by: Rebecca Trösch
- Music by: Blade&Beard, Ghazal Shakeri, Roland Widmer, Stefan Willenegger
- Release date: 2016
- Country: Switzerland
- Languages: Persian, English, German

Raving Iran is a 2016 Swiss film written and directed by Susanne Regina Meures. The film follows Iranian DJs Anoosh Rakizade and Arash Shadram as they try to organise raves and make electronic music while attempting to evade the controls of the Iranian government.

== Plot ==
Anoosh and Arash - who perform together as Blade & Beard — are filmed as they attempt to organise clandestine events, produce and distribute their album and are refused permits and permission to print their posters and CDs.

After Anoosh is arrested when police raid one of their parties, they decide to apply for visas to play concerts abroad. When they are invited to play in Switzerland, they eventually decide to apply for asylum there.

== Production ==
Meures worked for magazines like Dazed & Confused and heard about the underground music scene in Iran. She started trying to make contacts with people in Iran through Facebook, and then travelled to Tehran to meet people in person. She found it difficult to persuade people to appear in her film, but after promising Anoosh and Arash that their faces would not be shown in the film, they agreed to participate. "The film was actually planned in a completely different way than it turned out", Meures said.

Hyperallergic.com noted that "The film captures the tense atmosphere the DJs face alongside their camaraderie and unwavering desire to succeed." Meures, the film's director also told the interviewer that filming in Iran had been difficult, “The DJs regularly cancelled shoots because they feared it would be too dangerous. The whole experience wasn’t smooth for any of us.”

When the DJs were invited to London for the film's premiere at the Village Underground on April 27, 2017, the UK government denied Arash a visa, stating that the authorities were 'not satisfied that you [Anoosh] are a genuine visitor and will leave the UK at the end of your visit.'
