= Flamingos: Life After the Meteorite =

- Theatrical release poster
- Spanish: Flamingos: La vida después del meteorito
- Directed by: Lorenzo Hagerman
- Written by: Lorenzo Hagerman; Ajo Martín de la Hoz
- Produced by: José Cohen
- Narrated by: Julieta Venegas
- Cinematography: Lorenzo Hagerman; Gerrit Vyn; Eric Liner; Tim Laman
- Edited by: Cetina Geo; Lorenzo Hagerman; Miguel Labastida Gonzalez
- Music by: Bryce Dessner
- Production companies: Cactus Film & Video; Cornell Lab of Ornithology; Estudios Splendor Omnia; La Vaca Independiente
- Distributed by: Pimienta Films
- Release dates: October 20, 2024 (FICM); March 26, 2026 (Mexico)
- Running time: 83 minutes
- Country: Mexico
- Language: Spanish

Flamingos: Life After the Meteorite (Spanish: Flamingos: La vida después del meteorito) is a 2024 Mexican documentary film co-written, filmed, co-edited and directed by Lorenzo Hagerman. It is narrated by Julieta Venegas, who tells the story of love, survival, and perseverance of Caribbean flamingos.

== Narrator ==
- Julieta Venegas

== Production ==
It took 10 years to complete, with the work divided into two years of research, two and a half years of filming, and two years of editing; production was affected by the COVID-19 pandemic. The film was shot in the Ría Celestún and Ría Lagartos Biosphere Reserves and the El Palmar State Reserve.

== Release ==
The film had its world premiere on October 20, 2024, at the 22nd Morelia International Film Festival, then screened on May 23, 2025, at the 51st Seattle International Film Festival, on May 24 at the DocAviv Film Festival, on June 13 at the 2025 Doxumentale. and on October 10 at the 24th Innsbruck Nature Film Festival.

It was released commercially on March 26, 2026, in Mexican theaters.

== Accolades ==
Award / Festival	Date of ceremony	Category	Recipient(s)	Result	Ref.
Innsbruck Nature Film Festival	12 October 2025	Special Nature Jury Award	Flamingos: Life After the Meteorite	Won	
