= Novo (film) =

- Theatrical release poster
- Directed by: Jean-Pierre Limosin
- Written by: Christophe Honoré; Jean-Pierre Limosin
- Produced by: Hengameh Panahi
- Starring: Eduardo Noriega; Anna Mouglalis
- Cinematography: Julien Hirsch
- Edited by: Cristina Otero Roth
- Music by: Zendavesta; Loïc Dury; Kouz-1; Christophe Minck
- Distributed by: Haut et Court (France)
- Release dates: 3 August 2002 (Locarno); 25 December 2002 (France)
- Running time: 95 minutes
- Country: France
- Language: French
- Budget: $3.2 million
- Box office: $730,000

Novo is a 2002 romantic comedy film directed by Jean-Pierre Limosin and starring Eduardo Noriega. The film tells the story of a man who has amnesia. It screened at the Locarno Film Festival.

== Plot ==
Graham has severe amnesia and cannot remember what he has done hours after he has done it. Consequently, he must write everything down; who he knows, where he should be, even where he works. His boss takes advantage of his disability and manipulates him into having sex with her. Graham meets a temp called Irène and begins a relationship with her, which is difficult as he never remembers who she is. To help him remember, Irène writes her name on his chest with a marker pen.

A little boy called Antoine is frequently seen in the same places Graham happens to be. Graham doesn't notice this due to his condition, but it is clear to the viewer that the child is of significance. Through the machinations of his boss, Graham's notebook is stolen by Fred, Graham's friend, leading him into a misadventure to try to recover it.

Graham finds a tooth by a stream which he washes and keeps with him. He is picked up by 2 women in a town. He puts the tooth inside one of the women he intends on having an affair with and falls asleep in her car. When he wakes up an hour later, he has flashbacks of his past, thus helping him recall some of his past.

In a state of confusion, Graham is left wandering naked on a beach where he falls asleep. During the night the little boy, Antoine curls up next to him to and awakens Graham. Graham remembers Antoine as being his son. Antoine tells Graham that his wife, Isabelle, forgives him for his relationship with Irène as she knows he cannot help forgetting his family. Graham and Antoine are approached on the beach by the police who are concerned that a young boy is with a naked man.

Graham's therapist is concerned at his behavior and tell him that they cannot allow him to leave. He tries to explain to his therapist that he has got some of his memory back. The therapist is still not convinced and still wants to have the man committed. Graham then tells his therapist that he is feeling really cold, and asks to have a blanket to warm himself. When he receives the blanket, he repeats to the therapist that he is still cold and perhaps standing would make him feel better. At this point the therapist is in a confused state of mind, as Graham starts walking around the room with the cover over his head. Graham assures him that walking would warm himself, and that was the reasoning for him walking around the room. However, Graham then runs and escapes the room by jumping out a window in the office using the blanket to prevent himself from any injuries or cuts from the broken glass. While fleeing the area, Antoine is waiting for him, and the father and son run off together laughing.

Irène and Graham have another encounter with each other in a parking garage. Graham walks past Irène to go to his car, not remembering who she is. He pauses for a brief moment, and then turns around to walk back towards the building as if he forgot something. Irène drops one of the boxes she is holding, and he picks it up for her and they stare into each other's eyes. He then offers to carry the boxes for the woman to her car. Suddenly, they start making out in the parking garage standing by her car. Graham stops her though and tells her that they could not continue this in the parking garage due to a security camera being close by. Irène then invites him to come to her house, and tells him to follow her to her home. They meet up side by side at the parking garage's traffic barrier. At this point, Graham has already forgotten what he was doing and decides to drive through the barrier to leave the parking garage. Irène is disappointed but amused at what he had just done, so she then smiles and backed up her vehicle and drove through her barrier.

== Cast ==
- Eduardo Noriega as Graham / Pablo
- Anna Mouglalis as Irène
- Nathalie Richard as Sabine
- Éric Caravaca as Fred
- Paz Vega as Isabelle
- Lény Bueno as Antoine
- Julie Gayet as Julie
- Agathe Dronne as Céline

== Reception ==
At Rotten Tomatoes, the film holds an approval rating of 50% based on 10 reviews, and an average rating of 4.67/10. At Metacritic, the film has a weighted average score of 47 out of 100, based on 6 critics, indicating "mixed or average reviews".

Peter Bradshaw of The Guardian gave the film 1 out of 5 stars, calling it "exasperatingly thin and derivative". James Crawford of The Village Voice wrote, "after an opening 20 minutes of pert dialogue, charming performances, and true tendresse, Novo devolves into a plodding morass of love lost-and-found after Graham's forgotten wife enters the picture." Meanwhile, Deborah Young of Variety commented that "the characters are nice to look at but impossible to feel for, which is the underlying weakness of this technically innovative pic."
