= Chemistry.com =

Online dating service

- Website type: Online dating service
- Owner: IAC
- Website: chemistry.com
- Commercial: Required
- Registration: yes
- Launched: 2006

Chemistry.com was an online dating service. It was the sister site of Match.com and was established by the same team that worked for that company. The site's policies involved specifically pairing members for long-term relationships using methods it refers to as "compatibility" and "chemistry".

Chemistry.com's matching algorithm was designed by Dr. Helen Fisher, a professor of anthropology and scholar, and features interviews and contributions from her along with MSN spaces page, "The Great Mate Debate". On January 30, 2009, ABC's 20/20 aired a two-hour special featuring Dr. Fisher and discussing her theory and research behind the Chemistry.com personality test and matching.

The website became notable after several ads portrayed online daters who were rejected by eHarmony, including one which featured a gay man, highlighting the fact that eHarmony will not match people with individuals of the same gender.

In April 2008, Chemistry launched a new set of advertisements signifying the second phase of its long-term strategy, by taking the conventional wedding vows shared between two people and re-inventing them "Chemistry style".

As of June 2013, more than 8 million people across the world took the Chemistry.com personality test; a very similar test (it only has 56 easy to answer multiple choice questions that most people can finish in about 20 min or less) and it can be found in the beginning pages of Helen Fisher's book called "Why Him Why Her?".

== See also ==
- List of online dating websites
