= Les Amants du Flore =

- Written by: Chantal de Rudder; Evelyne Pisier
- Directed by: Ilan Duran Cohen
- Starring: Anna Mouglalis; Lorànt Deutsch
- Music by: Grégoire Hetzel
- Original language: French

Production
- Producers: Sophie Ravard & Nicholas Traube
- Editor: Hugues Orduna
- Running time: 105 minutes

Original release
- Network: France 3
- Release: 6 September 2006

Les Amants du Flore (The Lovers of Flore) is a 2006 French TV film, directed by Ilan Duran Cohen, about the relationship between Jean-Paul Sartre and Simone de Beauvoir beginning with their university years, then the following 20 years through the wartime, post-war fame and publication of Le Deuxième Sexe. It was made in April 2006 and broadcast on France 3 on 6 September 2006.

== Plot ==
In 1924 Simone de Beauvoir is a brilliant, but reserved young girl, who prepares to study philosophy at the Sorbonne university. Only fellow student Jean-Paul Sartre (who calls her 'Castor') recognizes her talent and intellect. Meanwhile, De Beauvoir also explores her bisexuality.

== Cast ==
- Anna Mouglalis : Simone de Beauvoir
- Lorànt Deutsch : Jean-Paul Sartre
- Caroline Silhol : Françoise de Beauvoir
- Kal Weber : Nelson Algren
- Clémence Poésy : Lumi
- Julien Baumgartner : Tyssen
- Sarah Stern : Tania
- Didier Sandre : Georges de Beauvoir
- Jennifer Decker : Marina
- Vladislav Galard : Paul Nizan
- Laetitia Spigarelli : Lola
- Robert Plagnol : Albert Camus
- Philippe Bardy : François Mauriac
- Nada Strancar : Principal
