= Isa Willinger =

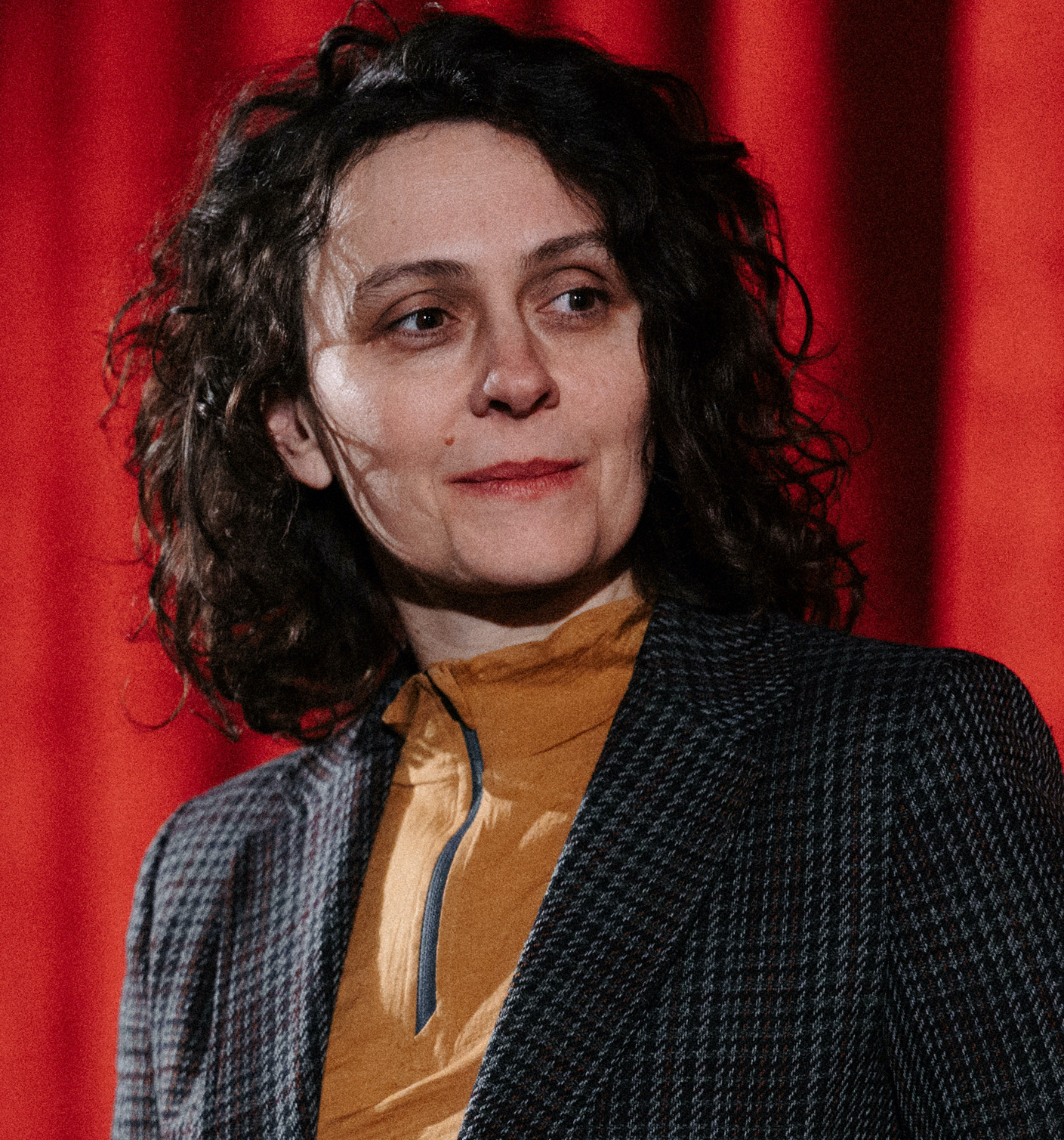
- Isa Willinger (2024)
- Citizenship: German
- Occupations: Film director Author
- Website: www.isawillinger.de

Isa Willinger is a German film director and author.

In 2005, Willinger was awarded a Fulbright scholarship to study at The New School University in New York City.

== Career ==
Willinger made her first feature documentary with Hi, A.I. – Love Stories from the Future (2019), which explores the future coexistence of humans and robots. The film was nominated for the German Film Award and received additional honors, including the SI STAR Award for Outstanding Female Directors.

Her second feature documentary, Plastic Fantastic (2023), examines the rapid growth of plastic production, the links between plastic pollution and climate change, and the lobbying activities of the plastics industry. The film received several awards, among them the German Ocean Film Award, Best Green Feature Award at the Green Film Network and the Audience Award at the German Documentary Film Awards.

Willinger's third feature documentary, No Mercy (2025), was invited to international film festivals, including the Viennale, the Thessaloniki International Film Festival, and DOC NYC. The film was inspired by Willinger’s engagement with the work of Soviet-Ukrainian filmmaker Kira Muratova and was developed from an interview she conducted with Muratova for her 2013 book on the director's cinema. Alongside her work as a filmmaker, Willinger has contributed to film scholarship and is the author of the 2013 monograph Kira Muratova: Kino und Subversion.

== Filmography ==
Year	Title	Director	Screenwriter	Notes
2013	Away from All Suns	Yes	Yes	
2018	Musik und Macht	Yes		
2019	Hi, Ai	Yes		
2023	Plastic Fantastic	Yes	Yes	
2025	No Mercy	Yes	Yes	

== Awards and nominations ==
Year	Award	Project	Result	Ref.
2019	Max Ophüls Award	Hi AI	Won	
2019	German Film Awards	Hi AI	Nominated	
2020	SI STAR Filmpreis, Outstanding Female Directors	Hi AI	Won	
2020	International Film Festival Signes de Nuit Bangkok	Hi AI	Won	
2024	German Documentary Awards, Audience Award	Plastic Fantastic	Won	
2024	German Ocean Film Award	Plastic Fantastic	Won	
2024	Green Film Network Award, Best Green Feature	Plastic Fantastic	Won	
2025	FIFES Cannes	Plastic Fantastic	Won	
