= Green Film Network =

International organization

The Green Film Network is an international association of environmental film festivals and was founded to support the work of international documentary filmmakers and promote films that raise awareness of environmental topics. The network currently comprises 32 festivals in 23 countries.

== Green Film Network Award ==
The annual GFN Awards honor the most inspiring and impactful environmental films of the past year, exploring critical issues such as climate, food, energy, wildlife, and oceans. Films are nominated by 30 international film festivals that focus on environmental issues, and the winners are selected by an international jury. The awards ceremony is hosted at one of the GFN member festivals, rotating each year.

In February 2014, the network presented the inaugural Green Film Network Award as a new international award for best environmental documentary of the year. The first GFN Award was presented to filmmaker Reuben Aaronson for the documentary Amazon Gold during the opening ceremony of Fife Île-de-France (International Environmental Film Festival) in Paris on February 4.

In 2018, an award for Best Green Short was introduced.

The 2020 Awards included a special presentation ceremony on April 28, 2021, which took place online due to the ongoing COVID-19 pandemic. 43 films from 25 countries were nominated. A special one-time award was also presented for Best Film of the Decade 2010-2020.

=== Best Green Feature ===
- 2024 - Plastic Fantastic directed by Isa Willinger
- 2022 - Eating Our Way to Extinction directed by Ludo Brockway and Otto Brockway
- 2021 - no award due to festivals being on hiatus during COVID-19 pandemic
- 2020 - Anthropocene: The Human Epoch directed by Jennifer Baichwal, Edward Burtynsky, and Nicholas de Pencier
- 2019 - Ghost Fleet directed by Shannon Service and Jeffrey Waldron
- 2018 - Genesis 2.0 directed by Christian Frei and Maxim Arbugaev
- 2017 - 24 Snow directed by Mikhail Barynin (joint winner)
- 2017 - Plastic China directed by Jiu-liang Wang (joint winner)
- 2016 - Landfill Harmonic directed by Brad Allgood and Graham Townsley
- 2015 - La Mujer y el Agua directed by Nocem Collado
- 2014 - Amazon Gold directed by Reuben Aaronson

=== Best Green Short ===
- 2022 - Dans La Nature directed by Marcel Barelli
- 2021 - no award due to festivals being on hiatus during COVID-19 pandemic
- 2020 - All Inclusive directed by Corina Schwingruber Ilić (joint winner)
- 2020 - Kofi and Lartey directed by Sasha Rainbow (joint winner)
- 2019 - Lost World directed by Kalyanee Mam
- 2018 - Water Warriors directed by Michael Premo

=== Best Green Film of the Decade ===
- 2020 - Racing Extinction directed by Louie Psihoyos

=== GFN Award Host Festivals ===
- 2023 - Cinema Planeta, Cuernavaca, Mexico
- 2022 - Innsbruck Nature Film Festival, Innsbruck, Austria
- 2021 - no ceremony due to festivals being on hiatus during COVID-19 pandemic
- 2020 - Online edition (due to COVID-19 pandemic)
- 2019 - CineEco, Seia, Portugal
- 2018 - San Francisco Green Film Festival, San Francisco, USA
- 2017 - Planet in Focus, Toronto, Canada
- 2016 - Dominican Republic Environmental Film Festival, Santo Domingo, Dominican Republic
- 2015 - EcoZine Film Festival, Zaragoza, Spain
- 2014 - Festival International du Film d’Environnement, Paris, France
