= Christian Frei =

Swiss filmmaker and film producer

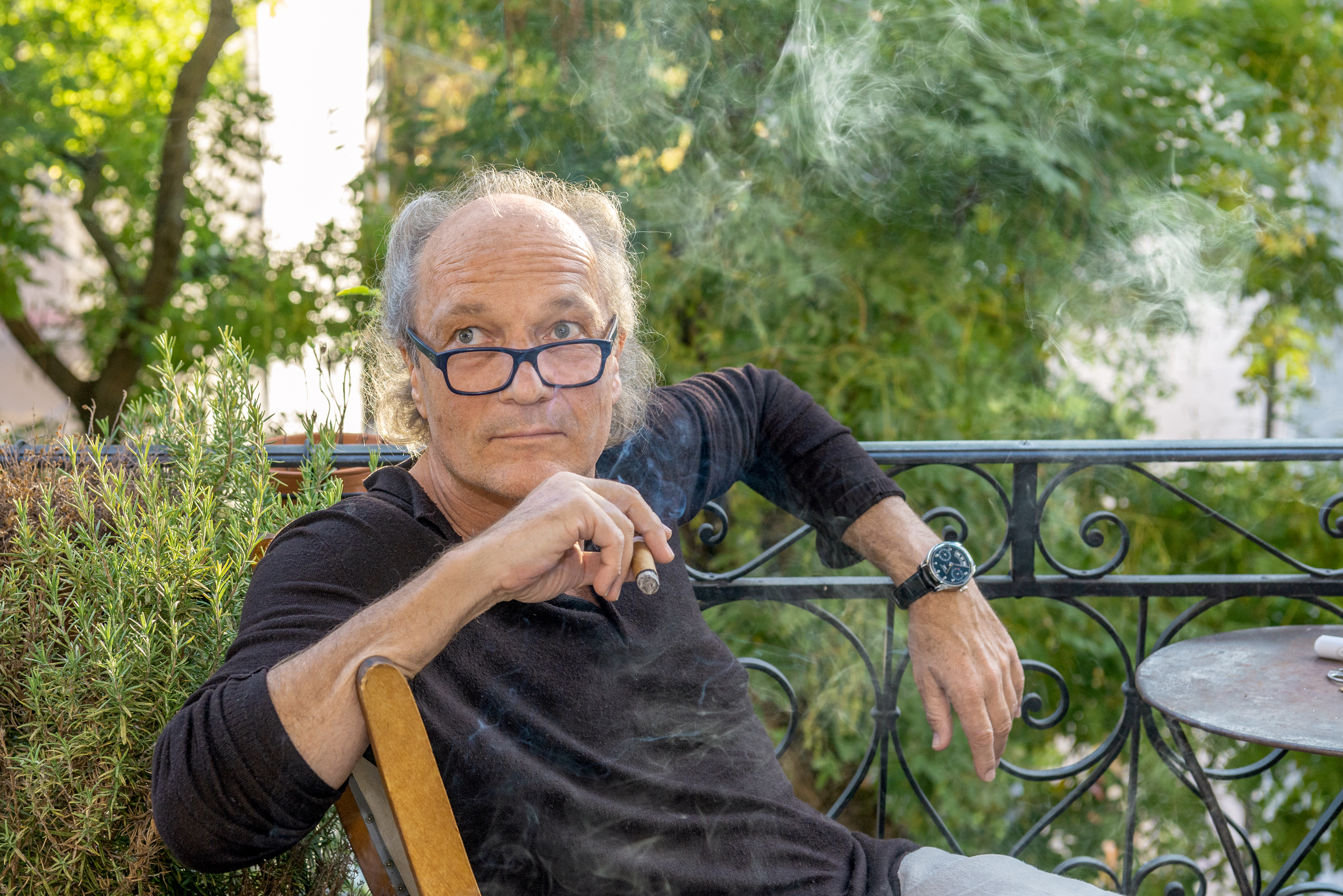
- Born: 1959 (age 66–67); Schönenwerd, Switzerland
- Education: University of Fribourg
- Occupations: Filmmaker, film producer
- Notable work: War Photographer (2001), The Giant Buddhas (2005), Space Tourists (2009)

Christian Frei (born 1959 in Schönenwerd, Switzerland) is a Swiss filmmaker and film producer. He is mostly known for his films War Photographer (2001), The Giant Buddhas (2005) and Space Tourists (2009).

Frei has been an associate lecturer on Reflection Competence at the University of St. Gallen from 2006 to 2023. From 2006 to 2009 he was president of the "Documentary Film Commission" for the film section of the Swiss Federal Office of Culture, and from 2010 to 2022 he had held the position of President of the Swiss Film Academy.

== Film career ==
Frei follows his protagonists closely - always in search of authentic moments, and always keeping the whole picture in mind. Peter-Matthias Gaede said that Frei made films that avoided "noise, pompous gestures, the rush of speed" and that he and his cameraman (Peter Indergand) made films that were subtle and "exude quiet persistance". According to Kulturzeit, "What makes these films so extraordinary? They are authentic moments that endure. Christian Frei takes us along a perimeter that both divides and unites individuals and cultures: the tectonics of humanity."

Frei studied television at the Department of Journalism and Communications of the University of Fribourg.

=== 1980s ===
In 1981 he directed his first documentary short film, Die Stellvertreterin. After co-directing Fortfahren with Ivo Kummer in 1984, he became an independent filmmaker and producer. He made another short film, Der Radwechsel.

=== 1990s ===
Then he moved on to feature-length documentaries with Ricardo, Miriam y Fidel (1997). The documentary was described as being "surprisingly revealing" by the Chicago Tribune, who went on to say that the "pain and disillusionment on both sides are in plain view". It portrays the rift between Miriam Martinez, who wants to leave Cuba for the US, and her father Ricardo Martinez - one of the founders of Fidel Castro's "Radio Rebelde". The Chicago Tribune goes on to say that the film "is equally sympathetic to Ricardo's revolutionary hopes and Miriam's hopelessness -- an amazing feat in a Cuban film."

=== 2000s ===
War Photographer (2001) received an Academy Award nomination for Best Documentary and numerous prizes worldwide. For this feature-length documentary, Frei spent two years accompanying war photographer James Nachtwey to different war zones around the world. The film shows his protagonist to be a shy and reserved man, far from the hothead image associated with his profession. Frei intelligently plays with the role of the spectator, confronting him with the ambivalence of war photography and the role of the media. The documentary appeals to the spectators' sense for compassion and thematically approaches the theme of war itself.

With The Giant Buddhas (2005), Frei once again deals with a subject of strong political and global interest: The film revolves around the destruction of the two giant Buddhas of Bamiyan in Afghanistan's remote Bamiyan Valley. It is an essay "on faith and fanaticism, tolerance and terrorism, identity and ignorance, the ephemeral and our feeble attempts to preserve it". The film turned out to be a documentary that filled a necessary gap of knowledge far from the everyday media war reportage.

At the Sundance Film Festival in 2010 Frei won the "World Cinema Directing Award" for his film Space Tourists (2009). The documentary juxtaposes the journeys of the extremely rich tourists traveling with the astronauts into space with the poor Kazakh metal collectors risking their lives in search for rocket waste fallen down into the planes once the space shuttle has left. As a result, the film turns out to be a humorous and poetic declaration of love for planet earth. Critics acclaimed this film for its breathtaking imagery and richness of insights.

=== 2010s ===
In 2014, Sleepless in New York premiered in competition at Visions du Réel, the Nyon International Documentary Film Festival. Frei dives into the frenzied nights of three newly rejected. Helen Fisher, an American biological anthropologist, reveals the astounding and profound processes that unfold in the brain of the lovesick. Working again with DOP Peter Indergand, they developed a spherical mirror to capture the solitude of the broken-hearted.

In 2016, as producer, Frei released Raving Iran, the first feature-length documentary directed by Susanne Regina Meures. She follows two Tehran DJs performing at illegal parties and planning to leave Iran. The film had its international premiere at the Hot Docs Canadian International Documentary Festival Toronto and won awards at numerous film festivals.

The documentary Genesis 2.0 had its world premiere at the Sundance Film Festival in January 2018 and was awarded with the World Cinema Documentary Special Jury Award for Cinematography. Swiss cameraman Peter Intergand and the Russian filmmaker Maxim Arbugaev are responsible for the cinematography, Arbugaev also co-directed the film. Genesis 2.0 follows mammoth hunters on the remote New Siberian Islands and portrays clone researchers and synthetic biologists in South Korea, China and USA.

=== 2020s ===
In 2020, Christian Frei produced Saudi Runaway, directed by Susanne Regina Meures. The film tells the story of a young woman from Saudi Arabia who no longer wants to be controlled and patronized by the state and her family. It celebrated its world premiere in February 2020 at the Sundance Film Festival 2020 and screened there in the section World Cinema Documentary Competition. At the Panorama Audience Award of the Berlinale 2020 in the category Panorama Dokumente, it reached 2nd place. This was followed by a nomination for the European Film Award for best documentary film, as well as the winning of the European University Film Award.

In 2022, Christian Frei produced Girl Gang, directed by Susanne Regina Meures. The film is about 14-year-old Leonie from East Berlin. As a teen influencer, she is conquering the world. Leonie's constant self-reflection and the ruthless pressure to produce content have a shadow side that the adrenaline, fame, and free sneakers cannot compensate for. The film received a nomination for the European Film Award for Best Documentary.

In 2025, Christian Frei released his latest documentary BLAME. After its world premiere as the opening film in Nyon at Visions du Réel. BLAME was shown simultaneously in São Paulo at the documentary film festival É Tudo Verdade / It's All True and in Moscow at the 5th Contemporary Science Film Festival, where it was awarded the Grand Prix. The film investigates the origins of the COVID-19 pandemic by focusing on three prominent scientists: bat virus expert Linfa Wang, virologist Zhengli Shi, and zoologist Peter Daszak.

== Filmography ==
- Die Stellvertreterin (1981)
- Fortfahren (1982)
- Der Radwechsel (1984)
- Ricardo, Miriam y Fidel (1997)
- Kluge Köpfe (1998)
- Bollywood im Alpenrausch – Indische Filmemacher erobern die Schweiz (2000)
- War Photographer (2001)
- The Giant Buddhas (2005)
- Space Tourists (2009)
- Sleepless in New York (2014)
- Genesis 2.0 (2018), co-directed by Maxim Arbugaev
- Blame (2025)

== Awards ==
- 2021: Honorary Doctorate PhD h.c. in Social Sciences University of St. Gallen, Switzerland.
- 2026: Honorary Big Stamp (Lifetime Achievement Award) from the International Documentary Film Festival Zagreb Dox, Zagreb, Croatia. The laudation by the Artistic Director Nenad Puhovski stated: “Frei's bold and truth-driven films offer penetrating, intimate portraits of people in extreme situations and address a wide range of issues shaping humanity’s fate, including war, technology, and sweeping social change.”

=== Ricardo, Miriam y Fidel ===
- Basic Trust International Human Rights Film Festival Ramallah-Tel Aviv 2000: audience award

=== War Photographer ===
- Academy Awards 2002: Nominated Best Documentary Feature
- Gregory Foster Peabody Award 2003
- Emmy 2004: Nomination Award for Cinematographer Peter Indergand
- Adolf Grimme Award 2003: Special Prize of the Westphalian Ministry for Development, Culture and Sports
- Durban International Film Festival 2002: Best documentary
- Cologne Conference 2002: Winner Phoenix Price Best non-fiction
- Rehoboth Beach, Delaware Independent Film Festival 2002: audience award
- Viewpoint film festival Gent 2002: winner
- European Documentary Film Festival Oslo 2003: Eurodok award
- Dokufest, Pizren Dokumentary and Short Film Festival 2003: winner
- British Documentary Awards 2002: Shortlisted The Grierson Award Category International Documentary
- Swiss Film Award 2002: Nominated Best Documentary Film
- Docaviv Tel Aviv International Documentary Film Festival: winner
- Sichuan Television Festival: Gold Panda Award Best Long Documentary
- Telluride Mountainfilm, Mountain Film Festival Telluride (Colorado) 2003: Voice of Humanity Award

=== The Giant Buddhas ===
- DOK Leipzig 2005: Silver Dove
- Dokufest, Pizren Dokumentary and Short Film Festival 2006: winner ex aequo
- Trento Film Festival 2006: Silver Gentian
- Reno Tahoe International Film Festival 2006: Best of the Fest – Documentary
- Sundance Film Festival 2006: Nominated Grand Jury Prize feature-length documentaries
- Swiss Film Award 2006: Nominated Best Documentary Film

=== Space Tourists ===
- The Documentary Channel 2012: Jury prize "Best of Doc"
- Cervino Cine Mountain International Mountain Film Festival 2011: Miglior Grand Prix dei Festival 2011
- Beldocs Belgrad 2010: Best Photography Award
- Berg- und Abenteuerfilmfestival Graz 2010: Grand Prix Documentary Feature
- European Documentary Film Festival Oslo 2010: Eurodok Award
- Sundance Film Festival 2010: World Cinema Directing Award
- EBS International Documentary Festival Seoul 2010: Special jury prize
- Swiss Film Award 2010: Nominated Best Documentary

=== Genesis 2.0 ===
- Sundance Film Festival 2018: World Cinema Documentary Special Jury Award for Cinematography to Maxim Arbugaev und Peter Indergand
- 40th Moscow International Film Festival 2018: Audience Award
- 15th Seoul Eco Film Festival 2018: Best Feature Film
- Lunenburg Doc Fest 2018: Feature Documentary Award
- International Arctic Film Festival Golden Raven 2018: Golden Raven Award
- 9th DocUtah International Film Festival 2018: Best Foreign Film
- Zürcher Filmpreis 2018: Film Award City of Zurich
- Budapest International Documentary Film Festival 2019: Main Prize section Naked Truth
- Swiss Film Award 2019: Nomination Best Documentary Film

=== Blame ===
- Visions du Réel 2025, Nyon, Switzerland: World Premiere, Opening Film, International Competition
- International Contemporary Science Film Festival 2025, Moscow: Winner of the Grand Prix for Best International Documentary
- DOK.fest Munich 2025, Germany: Nominated for the Viktoria DOK.International Award
- CinemAmbiente Festival 2025, Turin: Winner of the Audience Award
- Doc Edge Festival 2025, New Zealand: Winner of the In Truth We Trust Award
- International Festival Signes de Nuit 2025, Bangkok: Winner of the International Competition
- Schweizer Filmpreis – Nomination in the category «Best Documentary» (January 2026)
- #LabMeCrazy! Science Film Festival – Winner Best Documentary (February 2026)
- Roman Brodmann Prize 2026 – Nomination (March 2026)
