= Ricardo, Miriam y Fidel =

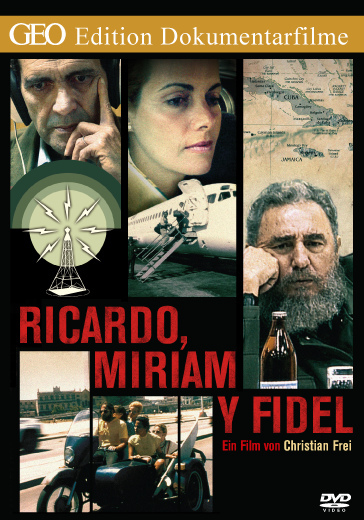
- Ricardo, Miriam y Fidel movie poster
- Directed by: Christian Frei
- Produced by: Christian Frei
- Starring: Ricardo Martínez; Miriam Martínez
- Cinematography: Peter Indergand
- Edited by: Christian Frei, Damaris Betancourt
- Music by: Arturo Sandoval; Chucho Valdés
- Release date: April 1997
- Running time: 90 min.
- Country: Switzerland
- Languages: English, Spanish

Ricardo, Miriam y Fidel is the first feature-length documentary of the Swiss director Christian Frei. It had his premiere at the Swiss film festival Visions du Réel. The film is a portrait of Miriam Martínez and her father, the Cuban revolutionary Ricardo Martínez. Daughter and father are torn between the desire to emigrate to the United States and the faith in the revolutionary ideas.

== Plot ==
The film talks about two individuals and their destiny. It shows the loss of utopia and the struggle of ideologies in Cuba: Ricardo Martínez is a former rebel of Fidel Castro. Together with Che Guevara he has founded the Pirate radio Radio Rebelde that became the main revolutionary voice of Cuba. The younger Cuban generation listens to Radio y Televisión Martí that broadcasts from Miami, Florida. Miriam represents this younger generation. By comparing this to radio stations, the film is as well about media history.

== Reception ==
The Swiss journal Der Bund has emphasized the overall impact of the film:

Christian Frei set out with his camera to explore the current situation in Cuba, the result being a documentary that is sustained by powerful images, that testifies to technical skill, a professional way of dealing with the material and, most importantly, a carefully deduced and clear message: the two protagonists, Ricardo and Miriam, reflect the tension between a revolution that has already turned into history and the present that in fact seems to be taking place elsewhere.

The Swiss film critic Norbert Creutz has estimated the objectivity and the formal quality of the film:

In keeping his distance and seeking greater objectivity, Frei highlights contradictions and paradoxes while being careful to avoid taking sides. He plays his cards slowly, showing great empathy towards everyone he interviews, examining things critically without ever making a judgment. In the end, he leaves the viewer to struggle with the issues he has raised. All this is done with an attention to story telling and aesthetics (from the quality of the photography to the sparing use of music) which reinforces the overall impact of the film.

The film had a positive reception as well in the Hispanic society:

A moving documentary that delves into an older generation's commitment to its country and revolutionary ideals, and a younger generation's search for a new life in the United States – and the disenchantment both encounter.

== Awards ==
- Basic Trust International Human Rights Film Festival Ramallah-Tel Aviv 2000: winner public award
- DOK.fest International documentary film festival Munich 1998: competition
- Filmfestival Max Ophüls Preis Saarbrücken 1998: section «Perspektiven des jungen Films»
- Solothurn Film Festival 1998: opening film
- International Documentary Film Festival Amsterdam IDFA 1997: section «Reflecting Images»
- São Paulo International Film Festival 1997: section «Competicao Novos Diretores»
- San Sebastián International Film Festival 1997: section «Made in Spanish»
- Human Rights Watch International Film Festival, New York City 1997: selection
- Chicago Latino Film Festival 1997: selection
- Visions du Réel Nyon 1997: competition
