= The Giant Buddhas =

- Directed by: Christian Frei
- Written by: Christian Frei
- Produced by: Christian Frei
- Cinematography: Peter Indergand
- Edited by: Christian Frei; Denise Zabalaga
- Music by: Philip Glass; Steve Kuhn
- Release date: August 2005
- Running time: 95 minutes
- Country: Switzerland
- Languages: Arabic, Dari, English, French, Mandarin

The Giant Buddhas is a 2005 Swiss documentary film written and directed by Christian Frei about the destruction of the Buddha statues in Afghanistan’s Bamiyan Valley after the Taliban ordered the destruction of figurative representations in February 2001. It premiered in August 2005 and won awards including the Silver Dove at DOK Leipzig in 2005 and the Silver Gentian at the 2006 Trento Film Festival.

== Synopsis ==
The film examines the destruction of two giant Buddha statues in Afghanistan’s Bamiyan Valley six months before the attacks on the Twin Towers in New York and uses the event to explore extremism, tolerance, identity, and the ways people and cultures are both divided and connected.

== Reception ==
=== Awards and nominations ===
The film won awards including the Silver Dove at DOK Leipzig in 2005, first prize ex aequo at Dokufest Prizren in 2006, the Silver Gentian at the 2006 Trento Film Festival, Best of the Fest – Documentary at the 2006 Tahoe/Reno International Film Festival, the Jury Prize at the 2007 Mountainfilm International Filmfestival Graz, and the Prix du meilleur reportage ex aequo at the 2007 Montreal International Festival of Films on Art. It was also nominated for Best Documentary at the 2006 Swiss Film Prize.

=== Critical response ===
Filmdienst described The Giant Buddhas as an essayistic documentary that approaches the myth of the destroyed statues in order to explore their beauty and their importance to Afghan cultural identity, and called it, overall, a reflection on transience and hypocrisy.

SRF cited the film as a documentary showing that the Taliban’s destruction of the Bamiyan Buddhas was rooted in the belief that all traces of non-Muslim religious communities should be destroyed.

Filmbulletin described it as a film about the loss of cultural identity.

Variety wrote that Christian Frei took a “pleasingly objective stance” toward the film’s emotive subject.

== Festival screenings ==
The film was later screened at festivals including the 2006 Planete Doc Review in Warsaw, the 2006 Dokufest International Documentary and Shortfilm Festival Prizren, the 2006 DOCNZ International Documentary Film Festival, the 2007 Montreal International Festival of Films on Art, the 2007 Mountainfilm International Filmfestival Graz, and the 2016 Festival International du Film sur les Droits Humains in Geneva.
