= War Photographer =

2001 documentary film by Christian Frei

- Produced by: Christian Frei
- Starring: James Nachtwey; Christiane Amanpour; Hans-Hermann Klare; Christiane Breustedt; Des Wright; Denis O'Neill
- Cinematography: Peter Indergand; James Nachtwey (microcam)
- Music by: Eleni Karaindrou; Arvo Pärt; David Darling
- Production company: Christian Frei Filmproductions
- Distributed by: Look Now!
- Release date: November 2001
- Running time: 96 min.
- Country: Switzerland
- Languages: English, German and French

War Photographer is a documentary by Christian Frei about the photographer James Nachtwey. As well as telling the story of an iconic man in the field of war photography, the film addresses the broader scope of ideas common to all those involved in war journalism, as well as the issues that they cover.

The documentary won a 2003 Peabody Award, and was nominated for an Academy Award in 2002 and an Emmy Award in 2004. It also won or was nominated for more than 40 other awards internationally.

== Synopsis ==
One of the main themes of the documentary is the level to which a journalist should become involved in the events that they are there to document. James Nachtwey credits the intimacy of his photography to his emphasis on establishing a rapport with his subjects, often despite a significant language barrier. Des Wright, a cameraman with Reuters, describes the problem of being too far removed from what is happening. Discussing a video reel of President Suharto's resignation and a police crackdown on protestors, he notes: "[Some journalists] say, 'I'm sorry, I'm a journalist, I'm not a part of this.' And I say, but you are a part of it. I think a lot of people would be quite happy for that man to be killed so they can get the particular picture that they want."

The documentary uses footage filmed with a small "microcam" video camera mounted on Nachtwey's SLR cameras. This allows the viewer to see the events from the perspective of the photographer.

=== Events and locations depicted in the film ===
- Post-war Kosovo
- Poverty and riots in Jakarta, Indonesia
- Ramallah, the West Bank
- A sulfur mine at Ijen in East Java, Indonesia
- New York City, New York, United States
- Hamburg, Germany
- Thokoza, South Africa

== Awards ==
- 2003 Peabody Award
- Nominated for an Academy Award, 2002
- Nominated for an Emmy Award, 2004

== Reception ==
War Photographer has an approval rating of 80% on review aggregator website Rotten Tomatoes, based on 25 reviews, and an average rating of 6.92/10. The website's critical consensus states, "War Photographer offers a breathtakingly intimate look at life on the front lines by distilling the horror and terrible beauty captured while paying testament to war's awful cost". Metacritic assigned the film a weighted average score of 79 out of 100, based on 12 critics, indicating "generally favorable reviews".

Edward Guthmann from the San Francisco Chronicle has emphasized that the film appeals to the spectators’ sense for compassion:

War correspondents, at least the ones that appear in movies, are rancid, crusty creatures -- emotionally numb, frequently drunk. James Nachtwey, the subject of the extraordinary "War Photographer," not only belies that image but also stands so far apart from it that his idealism and monklike commitment are inspiring. (...) This film is an act of spiritual faith – an eloquent, deeply felt meditation on the nature of compassion.

Ken Fox has estimated the humanistic approach of the film and of the work of James Nachtwey:

Frei assembles a fascinating profile of a deeply humanistic artist who, in spite of all that he's witnessed, remains surprisingly idealistic, and retains an extraordinary faith in the ability of images to communicate the truth of the world around him.

Similar Peter Rainer from New York:

Nachtwey, in his mid-fifties and lanky, with a full shock of hair, has a cool, almost Zen-like deliberateness. He speaks slowly and carefully, as if he had long ago weighed his words, one by one, and was only now offering us their gravity. He has been photographing the globe's worst hot spots for 25 years and has probably seen up close more grief and ruination than anybody should have to see in a dozen lifetimes, and yet he still believes he's making a difference. He regards his photographs as an antidote to war, and himself as an antiwar photographer. (...) Nachtwey clears the cynicism right out of you. He makes you realize that deep inside righteousness can be found a tough beauty.
