= Helen Fisher (anthropologist) =

American anthropologist (1945–2024)

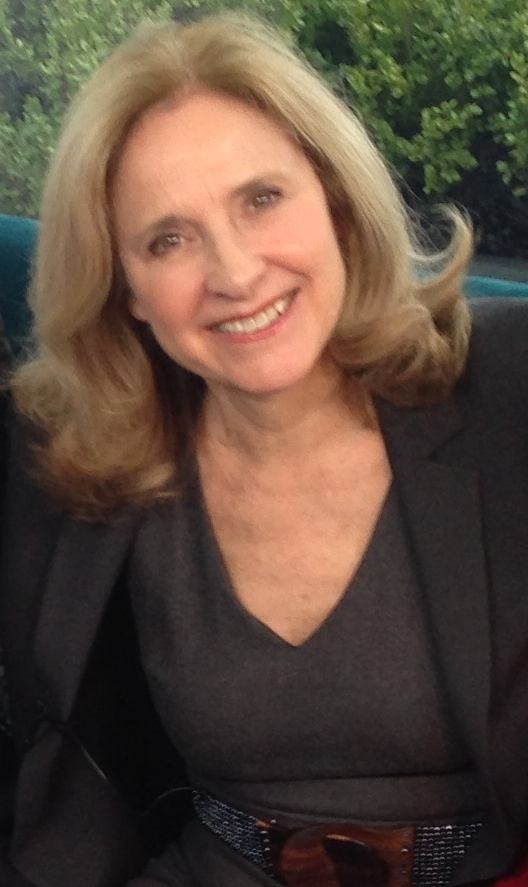
- Fisher in 2014
- Born: May 31, 1945; Manhattan, New York, U.S.
- Died: August 17, 2024 (aged 79); Bronx, New York, U.S.
- Education: New York University (BA); University of Colorado Boulder (MA, PhD)
- Known for: Why We Love, anthropology of sex, romance, attachment and personality
- Spouse: John Tierney (m. 2020)
- Scientific career
- Fields: Anthropology
- Workplaces: The Kinsey Institute

Helen Elizabeth Fisher (May 31, 1945 – August 17, 2024) was an American anthropologist, human behaviour researcher, and self-help author. She was a biological anthropologist, a senior research fellow at The Kinsey Institute of Indiana University, and a member of the Center For Human Evolutionary Studies in the Department of Anthropology at Rutgers University. Prior to Rutgers University, she was a research associate at the American Museum of Natural History in New York City.

Fisher said that when she began researching for her dissertation, she considered the one thing all humans have in common – their reproductive strategies. She and several collaborators authored the first MRI study to associate early-stage romantic love with brain areas such as the ventral tegmental area, which produces dopamine in response to viewing images of one's beloved. In 2005, she was hired by match.com to help build chemistry.com, which used her research and experience to create both hormone-based and personality-based matching systems. She was one of the main speakers at the 2006 and 2008 TED conference. On January 30, 2009, she was featured in an ABC News 20/20 special, Why Him? Why Her? The Science of Seduction, where she discussed her most recent research on brain chemistry and romantic love. Although Fisher has authored and co-authored numerous scholarly articles in anthropology and human behavior, her empirical research specifically focused on romantic love consists of two co-authored studies.

Fisher appeared in the 2014 documentary film about heartbreak and loneliness, entitled Sleepless in New York and the 2017 PBS Nova special on computerized dating, 'How to Find Love Online'.

Fisher advised that in order to sustain long-term deep attachment and romantic love, a couple should leverage neurochemistry by regularly having sex and physical contact (which drives up the oxytocin system), engaging in novel activities (which drives up the dopamine system), and saying nice things to one's partner (which reduces cortisol and cholesterol).

Fisher died of endometrial cancer in the Bronx, on August 17, 2024, at the age of 79.

== Early life ==
Fisher earned a B.A. in Anthropology and Psychology from New York University in 1968; an M.A. in Physical Anthropology, Cultural Anthropology, Linguistics, and Archeology from the University of Colorado at Boulder in 1972, and a Ph.D. in Physical Anthropology: Human Evolution, Primatology, Human Sexual Behavior, and Reproductive Strategies from the University of Colorado at Boulder in 1975.

== Research ==
=== 2004 ===
In her book, Why We Love: The Nature and Chemistry of Romantic Love, Fisher proposed that humanity has evolved three core brain systems for mating and reproduction:

1. lust – the sex drive or libido, also described as borogodó.
2. attraction – early stage intense romantic love.
3. attachment – deep feelings of union with a long-term partner.

The notion of these three reproductive systems originated in a scientific article written by Fisher in 1998. This theory has been critiqued and suggested not to be an accurate representation of the evolution or mechanisms of romantic love.

According to Fisher, love can start with any of these three feelings. Some people have sex with someone new and then fall in love. Some fall in love first, then have sex. Some feel a deep feeling of attachment to another, which then turns into romance and the sex drive. But the sex drive evolved to initiate mating with a range of partners; romantic love evolved to focus one's mating energy on one partner at a time; and attachment evolved to enable us to form a pair bond and rear young together as a team.

Fisher discussed many of the feelings of intense romantic love, saying it begins as the beloved takes on "special meaning." Then you focus intensely on him or her. People can list the things they dislike about a sweetheart, but they sweep these things aside and focus on what they adore. Intense energy, elation, mood swings, emotional dependence, separation anxiety, possessiveness, physical reactions including a pounding heart and shortness of breath, and craving, Fisher reported, are all central to this feeling. But most important is obsessive thinking. As Fisher said, "Someone is camping in your head."

Fisher and her colleagues studied the brain circuitry of romantic love by fMRI-scanning the brains of 49 men and women: 17 who had just fallen madly in love, 15 who had just been dumped, and 17 who reported that they were still in love after an average of 21 years of marriage. One of her central ideas is that romantic love is a drive that is stronger than the sex drive. As she has said, "After all, if you casually ask someone to go to bed with you and they refuse, you don't slip into a depression, commit suicide or homicide -- but around the world people suffer terribly from romantic rejection."

Fisher also maintained that taking certain antidepressants can potentially dampen feelings of romantic love and attachment (as well as sex drive) although all available evidence suggests this is not the case.

From the brain scans of people who had just fallen madly in love, Fisher's 2004 book discusses differences between male and female brains. On average, men tended to show more activity in a brain region associated with the integration of visual stimuli, while women showed more activity in several brain regions linked with memory recall. Fisher hypothesized that these differences stem from differing evolutionary forces governing mate choice. In prehistory (and today), a male was obliged to size up a potential female partner visually to ensure that she is healthy and age-appropriate to bear and rear their potential progeny. But a female could not know from a male's appearance whether he would be a good husband and father; she had to remember his past behaviors, achievements and misadventures—memories which could help her select an effective husband and father for her forthcoming young.

=== 2006 ===
Her MRI research, which showed that the ventral tegmental area and the caudate nucleus become active when people are in love, was featured as the cover-page article, "Love – the Chemical Reaction", in the February 2006 issue of National Geographic.

== See also ==
- Arthur Aron
- Bianca Acevedo
- Interpersonal attraction
- Keirsey Temperament Sorter
- Matchmaking
- Myers–Briggs Type Indicator
- Michael Liebowitz, The Chemistry of Love
- Neil Clark Warren
- Pepper Schwartz
