= Genesis 2.0 =

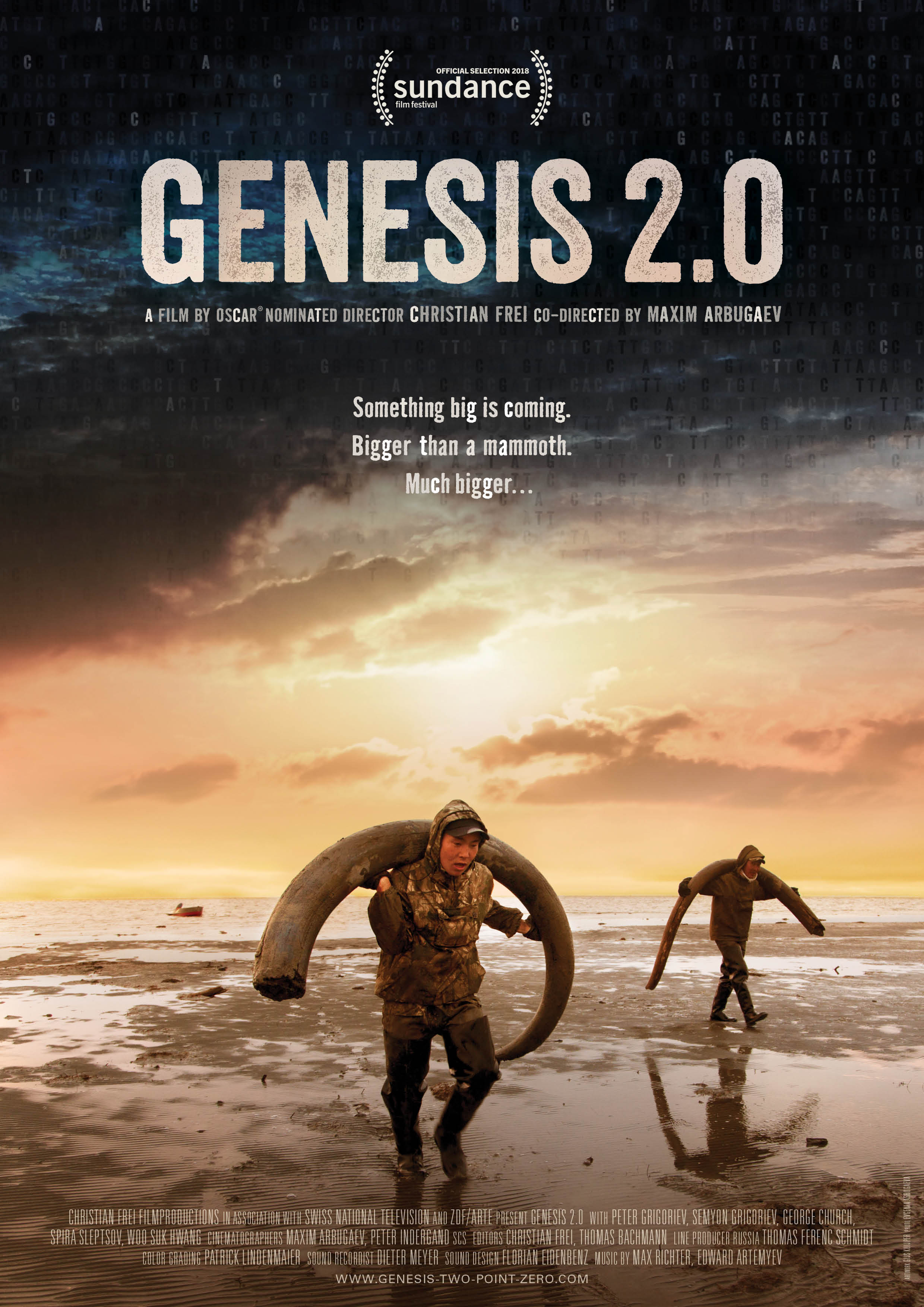
- Directed by: Christian Frei
- Written by: Christian Frei
- Produced by: Christian Frei
- Starring: Peter Grigoriev, Semyon Grigoriev, George Church, Spira Sleptsov, Hwang Woo-suk
- Cinematography: Maxim Arbugaev; Peter Indergand; Vladimir Egorov
- Edited by: Christian Frei, Thomas Bachmann
- Music by: Max Richter, Edward Artemyev
- Distributed by: Rise and Shine World Sales
- Release date: 20 January 2018 (Sundance Film Festival)
- Running time: 112 minutes
- Country: Switzerland
- Languages: English, Russian, Yakut, Korean

Genesis 2.0 is a documentary film made by Swiss director and producer Christian Frei and Russian filmmaker Maxim Abugaev. The feature-length film was released in January 2018 in the World Cinema Documentary section at the Sundance Film Festival. At the center of the film is the woolly mammoth, an extinct and iconic species that today is surrounded by wishes and visions. On the one hand, the film documents the hazardous daily lives of a group of men who gather valuable mammoth tusks in a remote archipelago, the New Siberian Islands. On the other, it illuminates the potential of genetic research and synthetic biology — the means by which researchers hope to bring the woolly mammoth back to life.

== Synopsis ==
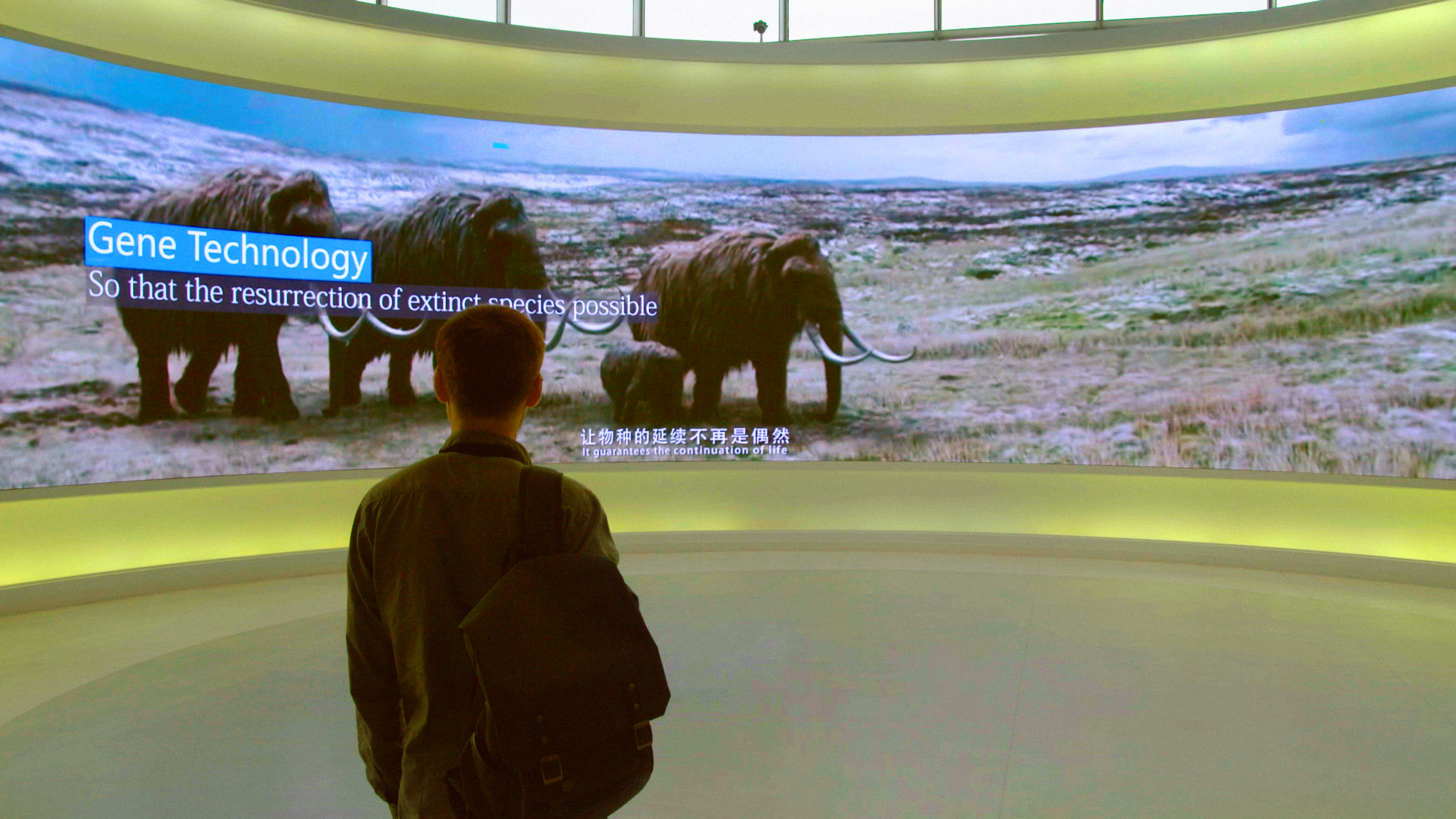
Semyon Grigoriev visiting the «Gene Museum» of the BGI Human Genome Center (film still).

Year after year, the mammoth hunters set out on a dangerous journey to the remote New Siberian Islands in the far north of Siberia. They dig into the earth in search of the tusks of extinct mammoths — precious ivory that they can sell for huge sums of money. Because the permafrost is thawing, entire mammoth carcasses are also coming to light, and scientists are showing great interest in these finds. Cloning researchers and molecular biologists are working with a variety of methods to achieve their goal of bringing the woolly mammoth back to life. The film takes us from the archaic landscape of the New Siberian Islands to a mammoth museum in Yakutsk, a meeting of young scientists in Boston, the International Genetically Engineered Machine competition, to a commercial cloning company in South Korea, and to gene data bank in Shenzhen, China.

== Themes ==
The film's Russian co-director, Maxim Abugaev, accompanied and filmed the Siberian mammoth tusk collectors during one hunting season. "(These) hunters are the native people of the North, who practice shamanism and believe in spirits of nature," says Abugaev. "They are very careful and superstitious in their approach to these uninhabited islands. We see the Arctic as a living creature of its own with mighty incomprehensible powers." "Genesis 2.0 deals with legends, myths and taboos and confronts us with our own fear of an unknown future," adds Frei.

In this situation, researchers such as George Church, Professor of Genetics at Harvard University see the potential of the science: "Synthetic biology is very likely to be the next big revolution. (...) Humans are very bold and they have vision. And they will follow that sometimes to their death."

Dr. Huanming Yang from the BGI Human Genome Center in Shenzhen sums up the future-oriented research shown in the film as follows: "We proposed the first project to sequence everything in the world. (...) God’s word is still imperfect. But if we work together we can make God perfect. The book of life is written with the same language. All the secrets are in this double helix." In this project, life becomes data.

== Protagonists ==
The professional mammoth hunter Peter Grigoriev and the unemployed stoker Spira Sleptsov share a desire to ultimately discover a spectacular mammoth tusk. Ivory, or "white gold", can be sold in China for high prices — and in order to reach this goal, the hunters are risking a great deal. They are torn between two driving forces: the promise of a great discovery and their spiritual belief that it is forbidden to disturb the mammoths’ remains.

Peter Grigoriev's brother, the paleontologist Semyon Grigoriev, is the director of the mammoth museum in Yakutsk. His goal is to one day be able to create a clone of a woolly mammoth. In order to realize this ambition he travels to South Korea, together with his wife, Lena Grigorieva, to visit the biotech company named Sooam, led by Hwang Woo-suk. In 2005, Hwang made headlines because his stem cell research was deemed as fraud; today he is the director of a successful commercial company that specializes in cloning dogs.

The woolly mammoth is an object of interest not only for cloning researchers but also for molecular biologists and geneticists. One of them is George Church, a Harvard professor of genetics who uses state-of-the-art technological methods for his research in synthetic biology. He is currently working on "editing" an elephant similar to a mammoth — a "mammophant".

== Release ==
The film premiered at the Sundance Film Festival in January 2018 and was awarded with the World Cinema Documentary Special Jury Award for Cinematography. Swiss cameraman Peter Intergand and Russian filmmaker Maxim Arbugaev were responsible for the cinematography; Arbugaev also co-directed the film.

== Reception ==
=== Critical response ===
On review aggregator Rotten Tomatoes, the film holds an approval rating of 80%, based on 15 reviews, with an average rating of 5.1/10. Similar review aggregator Metacritic calculated a score of 60 based on 5 critics, indicating "mixed or average reviews".

In The Hollywood Reporter, Sheri Linden writes that the film is a real-life thriller structured like a double helix, simultaneously frightening and unforgettable: “At the center of the heady mix is the woolly mammoth, a long-extinct species that key figures in the exquisitely crafted documentary are determined to revive. Those figures speak, without irony or warning, of the power to design bodies and perfect God's work.” She continues: “With elegance and poignancy, the score by Max Richter and Edward Artemyev sounds its own alarms, a stirring match for the striking camerawork by a number of cinematographers. And through the divergent paths of two Yakutian brothers, the film throws into question the simplistic notion of mercenary selfishness versus the purity of science.”

Wendy Idy from Screendaily finds the beginning of the film esoteric, as it opens with a female voice intoning a passage from a Yakutian epic tale. In her review, Idy emphasizes the significance of the film's basic message: “The overarching theme is humanity’s reckless courage — as such, it’s a picture which finds its closest parallels in the films of Werner Herzog.”

=== Accolades ===
Awards

- Sundance Film Festival 2018: World Cinema Special Jury Award for Cinematography to Maxim Arbugaev und Peter Indergand
- 40th Moscow International Film Festival 2018: Audience Award
- 15th Seoul Eco Film Festival 2018: Beste Feature Film
- CinemAmbiente Turin 2018: Best International Documentary
- Green Film Network 2018: Best Documentary
- Lunenburg Doc Fest 2018: Feature Documentary Award
- International Arctic Film Festival Golden Raven 2018: Golden Raven Award
- 9th DocUtah International Film Festival 2018: Best Foreign Film
- Zürcher Filmpreis 2018: Film Award City of Zurich
- Budapest International Documentary Film Festival 2019: Main Prize section Naked Truth
- Detour Cinema del Viaggio Film Festival 2019: Best Film

Nominations

- Sundance Film Festival 2018: Nomination Jury Prize World Cinema Documentary Competition (Christian Frei and Maxim Arbugaev)
- Swiss Film Award 2019: Nomination Best Documentary Film
