= Robert Levy (author) =

- Education: Harvard College John Jay College of Criminal Justice
- Occupation: Author
- Writing career
- Language: English
- Website: www.therobertlevy.com

Robert Levy (born 1974) is an American author of novels, stories, and plays. His first novel The Glittering World (2015) was a finalist for both the Shirley Jackson Awards and the Lambda Literary Awards. Though primarily a writer of dark fantasy and horror, Levy has published numerous works in many genres, including science fiction, pop culture, mystery, and noir.

== Background and education ==
Levy attended Oberlin College before graduating from Harvard College, where he received a degree in English and American Literature and Language. He went on to earn an MA in Forensic Psychology from John Jay College of Criminal Justice, and is also a graduate of the Clarion Workshop for Science Fiction and Fantasy Writers. He currently lives in his hometown of Brooklyn, New York, with his son Benjamin Levy and his other child.

== Career ==
At age seventeen, two of Levy's plays were finalists at the Young Playwrights Festival. The next year, his play Mrs. Neuberger's Dead was a festival winner and was subsequently produced Off-Broadway at Playwrights Horizons. After writing his master's thesis on the perceptual effects of early childhood traumatization, he began his career in publishing. He has since released numerous books under various pen names, as well as many shorter works. His works are often inspired by his training as a forensic psychologist.

== Selected works ==
=== Novels ===
- The Glittering World (Gallery Books/Simon & Schuster, 2015)

=== Short stories ===
- "The Vault of the Sky, the Face of the Deep," Shadows & Tall Trees 6 (ChiZine Publications, 2014)
- "The Oestridae," Black Static #52 (May–June 2016)
- "DST (Fall Back)," Autumn Cthulhu (Lovecraft eZine Press, 2016)
- "My Heart's Own Desire," Congress Magazine #1 (June 2016)
- "Conversion," The Madness of Dr. Caligari (Fedogan and Bremer Books, 2016)
- "Little Flea, Little Flea," People Holding (Winter 2017)
- "The Cenacle," Shadows and Tall Trees 7 (Undertow Publications, 2017)
- "The Company Kid," Strange Aeons (forthcoming, 2017)

=== Nonfiction ===
- "Was the Giving Tree a Chump?" Off the Shelf (The Huffington Post, February 2015)
- "You Live in the Devonshire?" The Brooklyn Quarterly (September 2015)

=== Plays ===
- Mrs. Neuberger's Dead (1992)
