= RoundGlass Foundation =

Indian non-government-organisation

Roundglass Foundation is an NGO working mainly in Punjab, India. Taking village as the microcosm of people’s lives, culture, economics and wellbeing, Roundglass Foundation is creating a thriving ecosystem for rural growth and wellbeing. The Foundation's three inter-related areas of impact action are critical for shaping a better future and include Environment and Sustainability, Youth Development, and Women’s Empowerment. The organization is headed by Vishal Chowla who was earlier COO at Save the Children India, and headed Direct Impact Team at GiveIndia.

RoundGlass official logo

== Initiatives ==
=== COVID-19 relief ===
RoundGlass Foundation started an initiative in April 2020 to distribute food ration to families in 400+ villages of Punjab during the COVID-19 pandemic lockdown. As of 8 April 2020, food ration was distributed to 457 households in 18 villages of Punjab, India.

=== Heart circles ===
Amidst the covid-19 lockdown, the foundation ran a project named Heart Circles in which volunteers reached out to school children by collaborating with schools in various districts of Punjab, India and gave them tasks and challenges to keep them engaged. Thus, giving the children an opportunity to share their feelings. Another part of the challenge contained challenges around STEM, Fitness and Acts of Kindness.

=== Self organized learning environment ===
In August 2019, the foundation created self organized learning environment labs in 20 villages in Moga district.
