= VIVA Film Festival =

- Location: Sarajevo, Bosnia and Herzegovina
- Founded: 2015; 11 years ago
- Language: International
- Website: www.vivaba.com

The VIVA Film Festival is an annual documentary and short film festival that is based in Sarajevo and in 19 cities in Bosnia and Herzegovina. The festival showcases international films with ecological, natural hereligious, touristic themes, as well as youth-made films. It was established by an international team of film professionals, environmentalists, diplomats, religious leaders and scholars that includes former US Vice President Al Gore (current festival Vice Chairman), Bosnian archeologist Semir Osmanagić and others, with the purpose of promoting inter-religious dialogue, the preservation of the environment and ecotourism.

== Format ==
The festival is composed of five competition programs: Grand Prix, Ecology, Religion, Tourism and Youth-directed. It is based in Sarajevo, where the centre piece events, projections and award ceremonies are held, but also travels to cities and towns across Bosnia and Herzegovina. Each town has its own management department and they are all interlinked. Heads of the various management departments sit in the festival's managing council. Each year's competition selection includes more than 100 films from over 45 countries that tackle the issues of inter-religious dialogue, environmentalism and ecotourism. A panel of filmmakers, religious and community leaders, writers and human rights advocates judges the entries, based both on their cinematic value and on their message, deciding on the three best films from each program.

== Award winners ==
=== Grand Prix ===
Year	English title	Original title	Director(s)	Country
2015	Baobabs between Land and Sea	—N/a	Cyrille Cornu	Madagascar
2016	Man From Salt	مرد نمک	Sajed Sayad Moosavi	Iran
2017	The Last Warriors	—N/a	Valentina Ippolito	Italy, China
2018	Our Roots	Nos Racines	André Russell	France

=== Ecology ===
Year	English title	Original title	Director(s)	Country
2015	WindEnds	—N/a	Andoni SanGaley	Spain
2016	Nature Needs You	—N/a	Mark Peace	Australia
2017	Day After Day	दिवसेंदिवस	Nagnath Kharat	India

=== Religion ===
Year	English title	Original title	Director(s)	Country
2015	As You Like It	—N/a	Paola Onet	Romania
2016	Jewish Blind Date	—N/a	Anaelle Morf	Switzerland
2017	Bhikkhuni, Buddhism, Sri Lanka, Revolution	—N/a	Małgorzata Dobrowolska	Poland
2018	Roses for Ashes	—N/a	Onur Kok	Turkey
2019	Tales of kokoro	Les contes de Kokoro	Mathias Monet	France

=== Tourism ===
Year	English title	Original title	Director(s)	Country
2015	The Glacier - An Alpine Legend	—N/a	Michael Schlamberger	Germany
2016	The Phenomenon of the Fortress	Fenomen tvrđava	Dragan Stojmenović	Serbia
2017	Novalja - Eternal Beauty on the Island of Pag	—N/a	Ivan Perić	Croatia

=== Youth ===
Year	English title	Original title	Director(s)	Country
2016	Ornament of the World	Ukras svijeta	Stefan Krasić	Serbia
2017	My Diary	Moj dnevnik	Petra Omazić	Bosnia and Herzegovina
