= Groundswell (film) =

2026 American eco-documentary film

- Directed by: Joshua Tickell; Rebecca Harrell Tickell
- Written by: Johnny O'Hara
- Produced by: Laurie Benenson; Eric Dillon; Ryland Engelhart; Joshua Tickell; Rebecca Harrell Tickell
- Narrated by: Woody Harrelson; Demi Moore
- Cinematography: Joaquim Adrià Pujol
- Edited by: Anthony Ellison; Tory Dahlhoff; Ben Dorger; Sycamore Mitchell
- Music by: Ryan Michael Demaree
- Production company: Big Picture Ranch
- Distributed by: Prime Video
- Release date: June 5, 2026
- Running time: 93 minutes
- Country: United States
- Language: English

Groundswell is a 2026 American documentary film directed by Joshua Tickell and Rebecca Harrell Tickell. It is the third and final installment in a documentary trilogy on regenerative agriculture, following Kiss the Ground (2020) and Common Ground (2023). The film explores the global movement toward regenerative farming practices as a solution to climate change, biodiversity loss, and soil degradation. It premiered at the Cannes Film Festival in May 2026 and was released on Prime Video on June 5, 2026.

== Premise ==
Groundswell travels across five continents, featuring farmers, scientists, Indigenous leaders, and others who are implementing regenerative agriculture techniques. The documentary argues that shifting even a portion of global farmland to regenerative methods could sequester significant carbon, enhance biodiversity, and address interconnected environmental crises.

Executive producers and narrators, Demi Moore and Woody Harrelson guide the narrative.

The film was produced by Big Picture Ranch, the studio founded by the Tickells. Filming took place in multiple countries, including the United States, Colombia, Kenya, India, and Brazil.

Groundswell had its world premiere in the Special Screenings section at the 79th Cannes Film Festival on May 13, 2026. It won the Golden Globe Prize for Documentary at the festival.

== Awards ==
Award	Film Festival	Year	Won
Golden Globe for Documentary Filmmaking	Cannes Film Festival	2026	Yes
