= Woody Harrelson filmography =

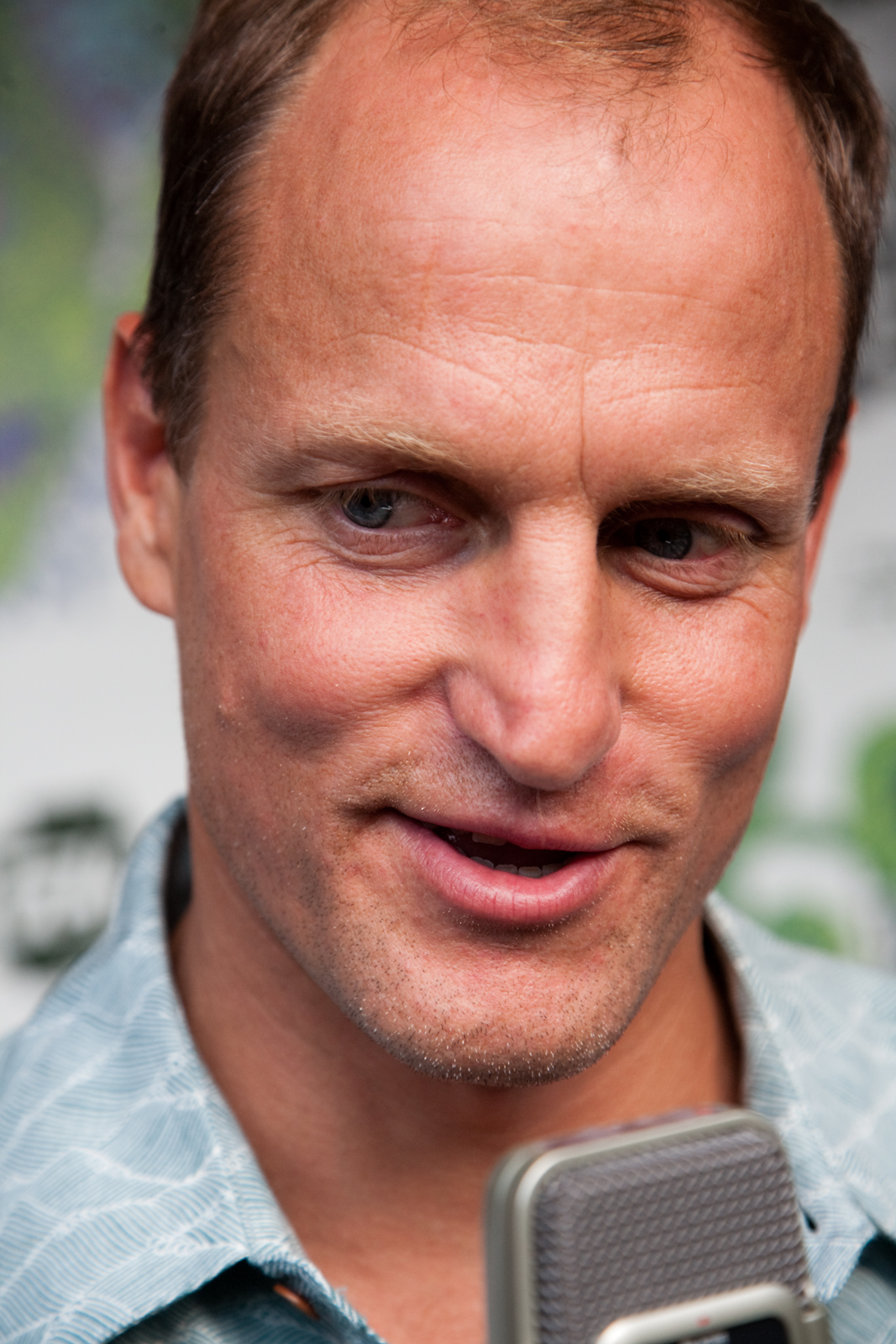
Harrelson at the 2009 premiere of Zombieland

Woody Harrelson is an American actor who made his film debut as an uncredited extra in Harper Valley PTA (1978). His breakthrough role was as bartender Woody Boyd on the NBC sitcom Cheers (1985–1993), which garnered Harrelson a Primetime Emmy Award for Outstanding Supporting Actor in a Comedy Series from a total of five nominations. He would later reprise the character in other television shows, such as Frasier and The Simpsons. In 1992, Harrelson starred opposite Wesley Snipes in White Men Can't Jump. In 1993 he starred in Indecent Proposal with Demi Moore and Robert Redford. He then appeared in the Oliver Stone-directed Natural Born Killers (1994) alongside Tommy Lee Jones and Robert Downey Jr. For his performance as free-speech activist Larry Flynt in The People vs. Larry Flynt (1996) he was nominated for a Golden Globe Award for Best Actor and an Academy Award for Best Actor. In Harrelson's own words, The People vs. Larry Flynt is his favorite movie he's made and the best movie he's made. He next appeared in The Thin Red Line (1998).

From 1999 to 2000, Harrelson acted in the Broadway revival of The Rainmaker. He then had a minor role in the 2003 comedy Anger Management. From 2005 to 2006, Harrelson played Rev. Shannon in a London production of Tennessee Williams' The Night of the Iguana. His next film role was as bounty hunter Carson Wells in the Coen brothers-directed No Country for Old Men (2007), which won the Academy Award for Best Picture. That year he also portrayed physician Robert O. Wilson in the documentary Nanking. In 2008, Harrelson starred opposite Will Ferrell in Semi-Pro and Will Smith in Seven Pounds. His work in The Messenger (2009) garnered him an Independent Spirit Award for Best Supporting Male. He then starred in Zombieland (2009), later returning to the franchise in Zombieland: Double Tap (2019).

Harrelson starred as Haymitch Abernathy in The Hunger Games (2012). He would return to the role for three more films: The Hunger Games: Catching Fire (2013), The Hunger Games: Mockingjay – Part 1 (2014), and The Hunger Games: Mockingjay – Part 2 (2015). He then played the title role in the 2016 biopic LBJ. For his performance in Three Billboards Outside Ebbing, Missouri (2017), Harrelson was nominated for an Academy Award for Best Supporting Actor and a BAFTA Award for Best Actor in a Supporting Role, but he lost both to co-star Sam Rockwell. That year, he also portrayed the militaristic "Colonel" in War for the Planet of the Apes. The following year, he appeared in the Ron Howard-directed Solo: A Star Wars Story (2018). He then portrayed Admiral Chester Nimitz in the Roland Emmerich-directed Midway (2019), after having a minor role in Emmerich's 2012 (2009). During the 2020 Democratic presidential primaries, he portrayed candidate Joe Biden for multiple episodes of Saturday Night Live. In 2021, Harrelson portrayed serial killer Cletus Kasady and voiced the symbiote Carnage in the Sony's Spider-Man Universe (SSU) film Venom: Let There Be Carnage, having first played the former character in a mid-credits cameo in Venom (2018).

== Film ==
Key
†	Denotes films that have not yet been released

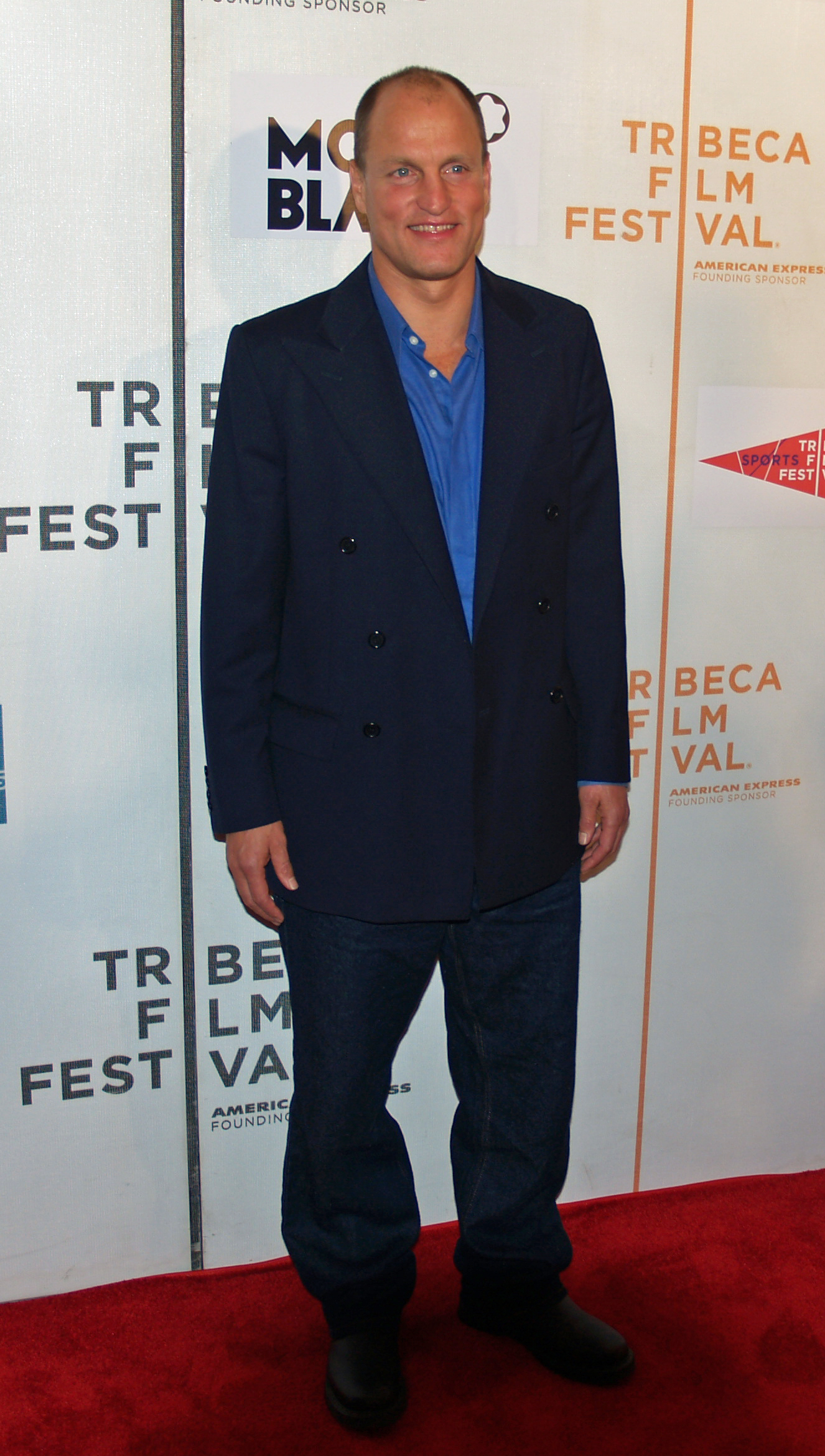
Harrelson at the 2007 Tribeca Film Festival

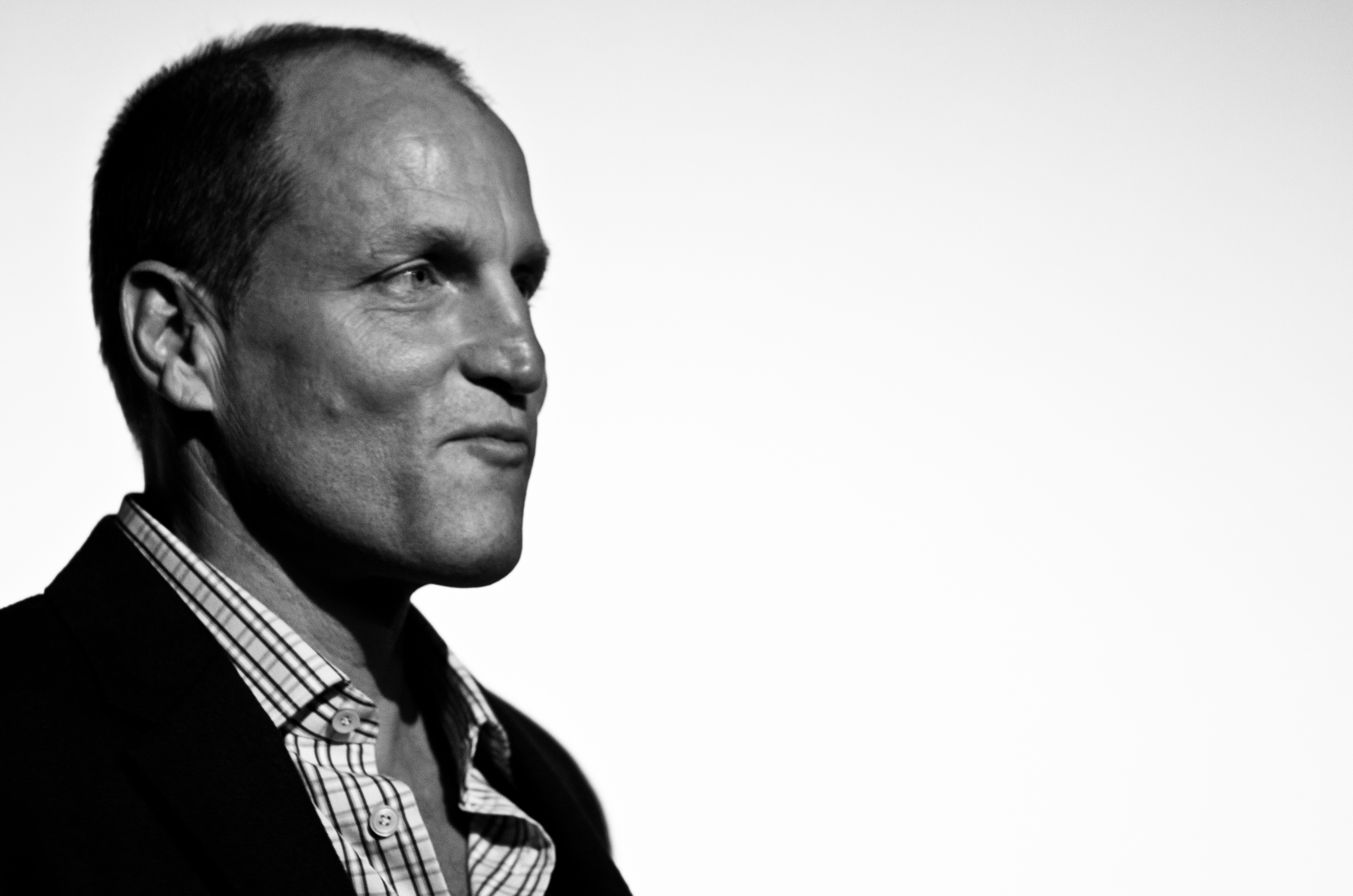
Harrelson at the premiere of Rampart (2011) at the 36th Toronto International Film Festival

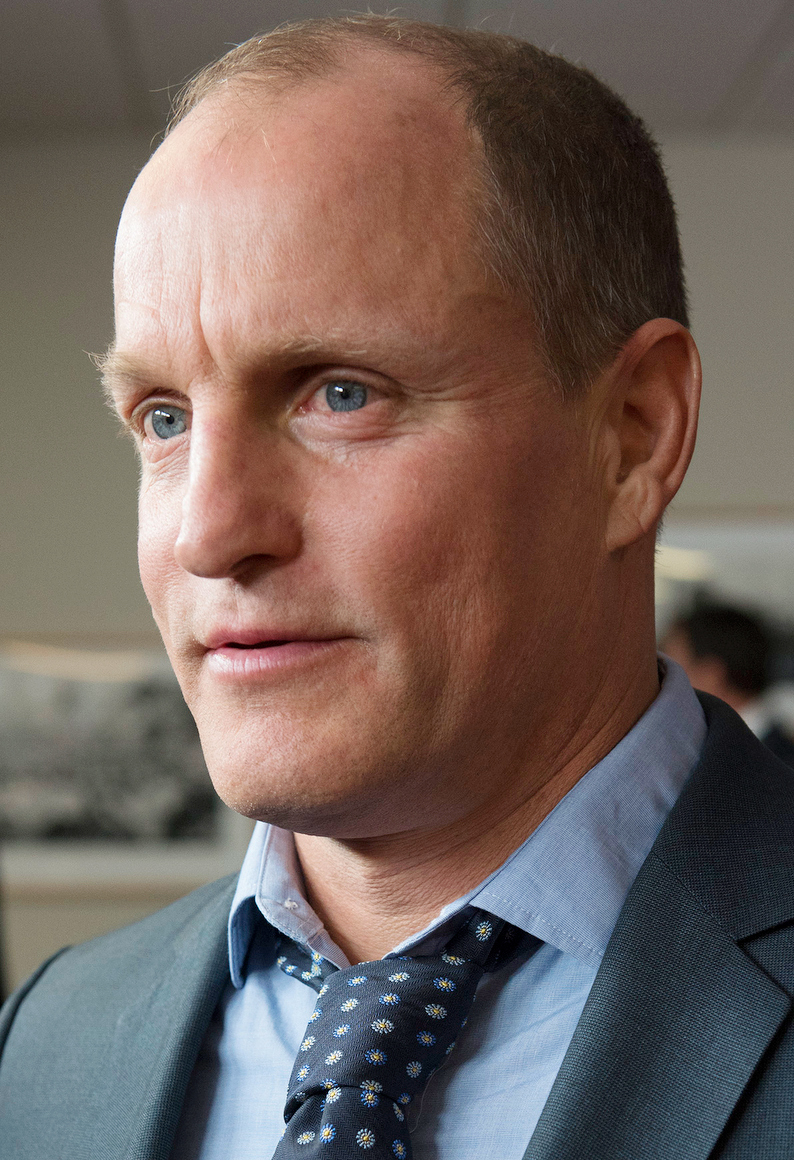
Harrelson promoting LBJ at the Lyndon Baines Johnson Library and Museum in 2016

Year	Title	Role	Notes	Ref.
1978	Harper Valley PTA	Extra	Uncredited	
1986	Wildcats	Krushinski		
1990	Cool Blue	Dustin		
1991	L.A. Story	Station manager	Uncredited	
1991	Doc Hollywood	Hank Gordon		
1991	Ted & Venus	Homeless Vietnam Veteran		
1992	White Men Can't Jump	Billy Hoyle		
1993	Indecent Proposal	David Murphy		
1994	Natural Born Killers	Mickey Knox		
1994	The Cowboy Way	Pepper Lewis		
1994	I'll Do Anything	Ground Zero Hero		
1995	Money Train	Charlie Robinson		
1996	The People vs. Larry Flynt	Larry Flynt		
1996	Kingpin	Roy Munson		
1996	The Sunchaser	Dr. Michael Reynolds		
1997	Wag the Dog	Sgt. William Schumann		
1997	Welcome to Sarajevo	Jordan Flynn		
1998	The Thin Red Line	Sgt. William Keck		
1998	Palmetto	Harry Barber		
1998	The Hi-Lo Country	Big Boy Matson		
1999	Play It to the Bone	Vince Boudreau		
1999	EDtv	Ray Pekurny		
1999	Austin Powers: The Spy Who Shagged Me	Himself		
1999	Grass	Narrator (voice)		
2000	Welcome To Hollywood	Himself	Cameo	
2003	Anger Management	Galaxia / Security Gary		
2003	Go Further	Himself		
2003	Scorched	Jason "Woods" Valley		
2004	After the Sunset	Stanley "Stan" P. Lloyd		
2004	She Hate Me	Lenald Power		
2005	North Country	Bill White		
2005	The Prize Winner of Defiance, Ohio	Leo "Kelly" Ryan		
2005	The Big White	Raymond "Ray" Barnell		
2006	Free Jimmy	Roy Arnie (voice)		
2006	A Scanner Darkly	Ernie Luckman		
2006	A Prairie Home Companion	Dusty		
2007	The Walker	Carter Page III		
2007	No Country for Old Men	Carson Wells		
2007	Battle in Seattle	Dale		
2007	The Grand	One Eyed Jack Faro		
2007	Nanking	Robert O. "Bob" Wilson		
2008	Semi-Pro	Ed Monix		
2008	Sleepwalking	Randall		
2008	Transsiberian	Roy		
2008	Surfer, Dude	Jack Mayweather		
2008	Management	Jango		
2008	Seven Pounds	Ezra Turner		
2009	The Messenger	Captain Anthony "Tony" Stone		
2009	Defendor	Arthur Poppington / Defendor		
2009	Zombieland	Tallahassee		
2009	2012	Charlie Frost		
2010	Bunraku	The Bartender		
2010	Hempsters: Plant the Seed	Himself		
2011	Friends with Benefits	Tommy Bollinger		
2011	Ethos	Narrator (voice)		
2011	Rampart	David Douglas "Dave" Brown		
2012	The Hunger Games	Haymitch Abernathy		
2012	Seven Psychopaths	Charlie Costello		
2013	How to Make Money Selling Drugs	Himself		
2013	Now You See Me	Merritt McKinney		
2013	Out of the Furnace	Harlan DeGroat		
2013	Free Birds	Jake (voice)		
2013	The Hunger Games: Catching Fire	Haymitch Abernathy		
2014	The Hunger Games: Mockingjay – Part 1	Haymitch Abernathy		
2015	The Hunger Games: Mockingjay – Part 2	Haymitch Abernathy		
2016	Triple 9	Sergeant Detective Jeffrey Allen		
2016	Now You See Me 2	Chase McKinney / Merritt McKinney		
2016	The Duel	Abraham Brant		
2016	LBJ	Lyndon B. Johnson		
2016	The Edge of Seventeen	Max Bruner		
2017	Lost in London	Himself	Also director, producer and writer	
2017	Wilson	Wilson		
2017	War for the Planet of the Apes	Colonel J. Wesley McCullough		
2017	The Glass Castle	Rex Walls		
2017	Three Billboards Outside Ebbing, Missouri	Sheriff Bill Willoughby		
2017	Shock and Awe	Jonathan Landay		
2018	Solo: A Star Wars Story	Tobias Beckett		
2018	Venom	Cletus Kasady / Red	Mid-credits cameo	
2019	The Highwaymen	Maney Gault	Also executive producer	
2019	Zombieland: Double Tap	Tallahassee		
2019	Midway	Admiral Chester Nimitz		
2020	Kiss the Ground	Narrator		
2021	Kate	Varrick		
2021	Venom: Let There Be Carnage	Cletus Kasady / Carnage (voice)		
2022	Triangle of Sadness	Captain Thomas Smith		
2022	The Man from Toronto	Randy		
2023	Champions	Marcus Marakovich	Also executive producer	
2023	Common Ground	Himself		
2024	Suncoast	Paul Warren		
2024	Fly Me to the Moon	Moe Berkus		
2025	Last Breath	Duncan Allcock		
2025	The Electric State	Mr. Peanut (voice)		
2025	Animal Farm	Boxer (voice)		
2025	Now You See Me: Now You Don't	Merritt McKinney		
2025	Ella McCay	Eddie McCay		
2026	Full Phil	Philip Doom		
2026	The Hunger Games: Sunrise on the Reaping	Haymitch Abernathy		
TBA	The Cackling of the Dodos †		Post-production	

== Television ==
Key
†	Denotes television productions that have not yet been released

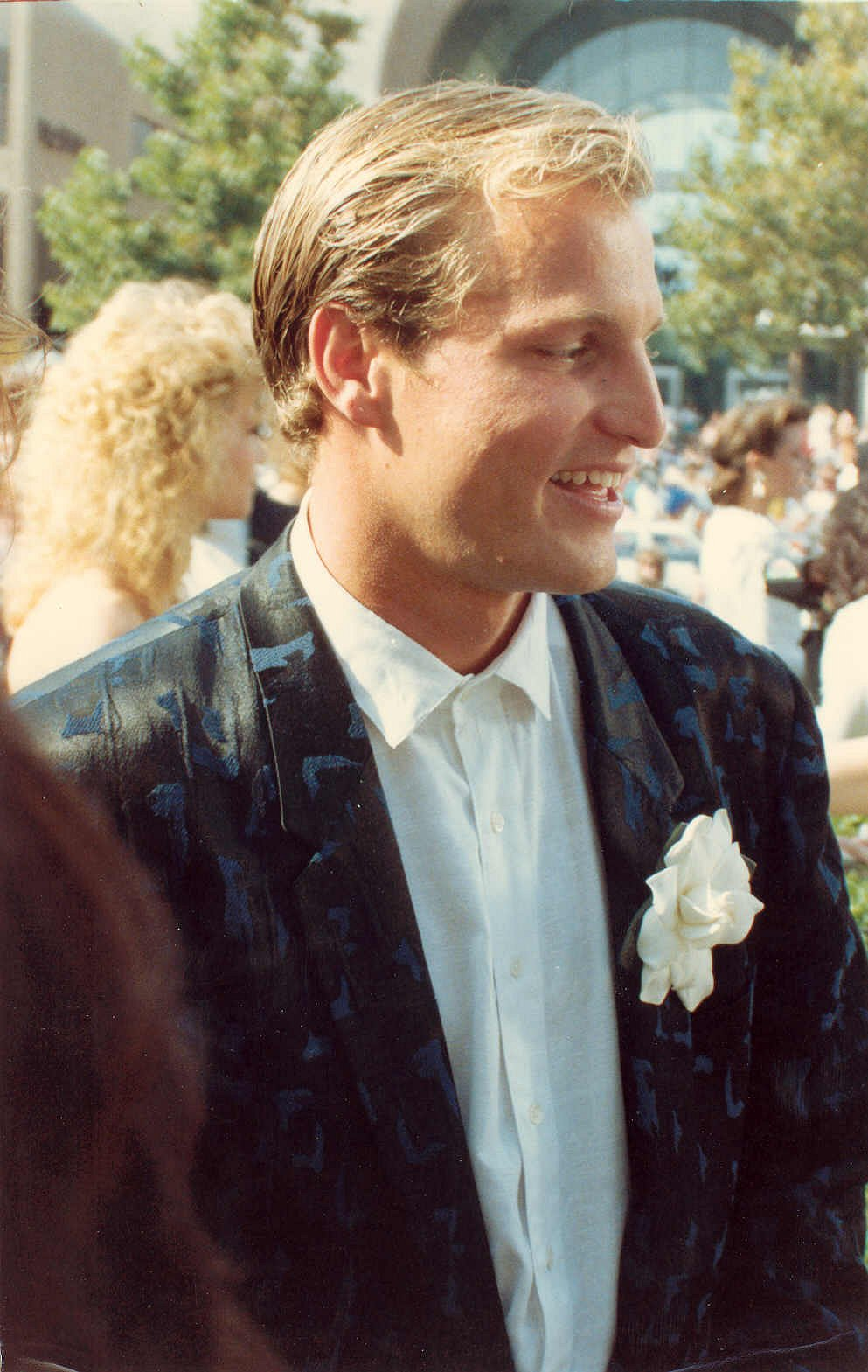
Harrelson on the red carpet at the 40th Primetime Emmy Awards in 1988

Year	Title	Roles	Notes	Ref.
1985–1993	Cheers	Woody Boyd	196 episodes	
1987	Bay Coven	Slater	Television film	
1988	Mickey's 60th Birthday	Woody Boyd	Television special	
1989	Dear John	Richard	Episode: "Love and Marriage"	
1989–2023	Saturday Night Live	Himself / various	5 episodes as host, 3 episodes as guest	
1990	Mother Goose Rock 'n' Rhyme	Lou the Lamb	Television film	
1994	The Simpsons	Woody Boyd (voice)	Episode: "Fear of Flying"	
1996	Spin City	Tommy Dugan	Episode: "Meet Tommy Dugan"	
1999	Frasier	Woody Boyd	Episode: "The Show Where Woody Shows Up"	
2001–2002	Will & Grace	Nathan	7 episodes	
2012	Game Change	Steve Schmidt	Television film	
2013	David Blaine: Real or Magic	Himself	Television special	
2014	True Detective	Martin "Marty" Hart	8 episodes; also executive producer	
2019	Live in Front of a Studio Audience	Archie Bunker	2 episodes	
2020–present	The Freak Brothers	Freewheelin' Franklin Freek (voice)	Main role; also executive producer	
2021	Curb Your Enthusiasm	Himself	Episode: "The Watermelon"	
2023	White House Plumbers	E. Howard Hunt	5 episodes; also executive producer	
2026	Brothers	Himself	Main role; also creator and executive producer	

== Theatre ==
Year	Title	Role	Location	Notes	Ref.
1985–1986	Biloxi Blues	Joseph Wykowski, Roy Selridge (standbys)	Neil Simon Theatre		
1987–1988	The Boys Next Door	Jack	Lamb's Theatre		
1999–2000	The Rainmaker	Bill Starbuck	Brooks Atkinson Theatre		
2002	On an Average Day	Bob	Harold Pinter Theatre, London		
2005–2006	The Night of the Iguana	Shannon	Lyric Theatre, London		
2012	Bullet for Adolf	—	New World Stages Stage IV	Director and playwright	
2023–2024	Ulster American	Jay	Riverside Studios, London		

== Music videos ==
Year	Title	Performer	Album	Ref.
2015	"Song for Someone"	U2	Songs of Innocence (single)	

== Audio ==
Year	Title	Role	Notes	Ref(s)
2023	White House Plumbers Podcast	Himself	3 episodes	

== See also ==
- List of awards and nominations received by Woody Harrelson
