= Italian Environmental Film Festival =

The Italian Environmental Film Festival (in Italian: Festival CinemAmbiente or Festival internazionale di cinema e cultura ambientale) is an important Italian film festival founded in 1998 and taking place every year in Turin, Italy. It is a member of the Environmental Film Festival Network, which is an association of international festivals in environmental issues.

== Award winners ==
- 2001: Children, Kossoco 2000 by Ferenc Moldovànyi (Hungary, 2001, 30')
- 2002: God's Children by Hiroshi Shinomiya (Japan, 2001, 105')
- 2003: Dans Grozny dans by Jos de Putter (Netherlands, 2002, 75')
- 2004: Carpatia by Andrzej Klamt and Ulrich Rydzewsky, (Germany, Austria, 2004, 127')
- 2005: Shape of the Moon by Leonard Retel Helmrich, (Netherlands, 2004, 92')
- 2006: The Real Dirt on Farmer John by Taggart Siegel (USA, 2005, 83')
- 2007: The Planet by Michael Stenberg, Linus Torell and Johan Söderberg, (Sweden, Norway, 2006, 84')
- 2008: The Nuclear Come Back by Justin Pemberton, (New Zealand, 2007, 75')
- 2009: Old partner by Lee Chung-ryoul, (South Korea, 2008, 75')
- 2010: Life for sale by Yorgos Avgeropoulos (Greece, 2010, 61'), 2010)
- 2011: There once was an island by Briar March (New Zealand, USA, 2010, 80')
- 2012: The Big Fix by Josh Tickell and Rebecca Tickell (USA, France, 2011, 88’)
- 2013: Der Letze Fang by Markus C. M. Schmidt, (Germany, 2012, 85’)
- 2014: Virunga by Orlando von Einsiedel, (Great Britain, 2014, 97)
- 2015: Bikes vs Cars by Fredrik Gertten, (Sweden, 2015, 91’)
- 2016: When Two Worlds Collide by Heidi Brandenburg and Mathew Orzel, (Peru, 2016, 100')
- 2017: Plastic China by Jiuliang Wang (China, 2016, 82’)
- 2018: Genesis 2.0 by Christian Frei, Maxim Arbugaev (Swiss, 2018, 103’)
- 2019: The Burning Field by Justin Weinrich, (USA, 2019, 72’)
- 2020: special online edition without prizewinners due to the COVID-19 pandemic
- 2021: Marcher sur l'eau by Aissa Maiga, (France, Belgium, 2021, 89')
