= Pump (film) =

- Film poster
- Written by: Johnny O'Hara; Josh Tickell
- Produced by: Rebecca Harrell Tickell; Darius Fisher; Eyal Aronoff; Yossie Hollander
- Narrated by: Jason Bateman
- Cinematography: Martin Dicicco
- Edited by: Edu Sallouti; Sean P. Keenan; Phil Norden
- Music by: Richard Gibbs; Austin Creek
- Production companies: Fuel Freed Foundation iDeal Partners Film Fund
- Distributed by: Submarine Deluxe
- Release date: September 12, 2014
- Running time: 88 minutes
- Country: United States
- Language: English
- Budget: $2 million
- Box office: $89,787

Pump is a 2014 documentary film by Josh Tickell and Rebecca Harrell Tickell. The film begins by exploring the history of petroleum-based fuel consumption, the use of the Internal combustion engine and the geopolitics involved with petroleum. It is primarily focuses on the United States but also includes a segment on the automotive industry in China. The film then explores in-depth on the alternative energy options for vehicles that are either readily available for use or can be on a mass scale. This includes ethanol fuel, methanol fuel, Flexible-fuel vehicles in Brazil, flexible-fuel vehicles in the United States, and electric vehicles including Tesla Motors.

Funding for the film came from Patrón tequila founder John Paul DeJoria, Rhino Films executive Stephen Nemeth and the Fuel Freedom Foundation.

== Criticism ==
Pump has been criticised for promoting fossil fuel production such as fracking and methanol from fossil gas, as well as promoting biofuels, which are controversial due to their competition for agricultural land with food production and high emissions. For instance, one peer-reviewed paper found that maize ethanol is estimated to have a higher emissions impact than gasoline and diesel, once carbon opportunity costs are factored in, and substantially higher emissions than solar-powered electric vehicles. Pump was partly funded by the Fuel Freedom Foundation, whose aim is to reduce American dependence on imported oil through replacing it with US-produced methanol from fossil gas, compressed natural gas (obtained by fracking) and biofuels. These solutions are promoted in Pump, which includes an interview with John Hofmeister, Advisory Board member of the Fuel Freedom Foundation and former President of Shell Oil Co.
