= Darius Fisher =

British film producer

- Born: London, England
- Education: University of Sussex
- Occupation(s): Filmmaker, film producer, visual effects engineer
- Employer: Digital Neural Axis
- Notable work: Fuel, The Aviator, Bhutto, The Big Fix, Kiss the Ground
- Children: 2

Darius Fisher is a British film producer, filmmaker, entrepreneur, and visual effects engineer. He is most well known for his work on the 2008 Sundance award-winning film Fuel, and also for The Aviator, Bhutto, The Big Fix, Kiss the Ground and the trailer that helped secure funding for Avatar. He is also the founder of Digital Neural Axis, a production company.

== Background ==
Fisher is originally from the United Kingdom where he attended University of Sussex and earned Bachelor of Arts degrees in French and European studies.

- Birthday: May 30th 1964 - Degree in French and European Studies from the University of Sussex, UK - Born in London and emigrated to US in 1993. Dual British and US Citizenship.

== Career ==
Fisher was living in New York when he started working as an editor, motion graphic designer and visual effects artist having focussed mainly on production in the UK. In 1998 he moved to Venice, California and brought with him the production company Digital Neutral Axis he founded in New York with his previous wife and his film partner Johnny O'Hara joined the business. They began working on visual effects for major films including The Last Samurai (2003), The Aviator (2004) and Superman Returns (2006). Additionally, he has produced or co-produced ten award-winning documentaries including, Fuel (Sundance winner), Bhutto (Emmy nominee, Peabody winner), The Big Fix (Cannes official selection), Kiss the Ground (Official selection Tribeca) and several trailers including the trailer that led to the financing of James Cameron's Avatar.

== Personal life ==
Fisher lives in Topanga, California.

== Filmography ==
- The Last Samurai (digital compositor, 2003)
- The Aviator (visual effects supervisor dna, 2004)
- Encounter Point (co-producer, 2006)
- Superman Returns (visual effects supervisor dna, 2006)
- Fuel (Producer, 2008)
- Avatar (virtual production consultant, 2009)
- Budrus (co-producer, 2009)
- Bhutto (co-producer, 2010)
- Dylan Dog: Dead of Night (visual effects producer, 2010)
- The Big Fix (co-producer, 2012)
- Dear Mom, Love Cher (co-producer, 2013)
- Love Thy Nature (digital effects) / (visual effects supervisor, 2014)
- Pump (co-producer, 2014)
- Kiss the Ground (Producer/Editor/Online Editor, 2020)
