= Fuel (film) =

- Directed by: John Tickell
- Written by: Johnny O'Hara; Josh Tickell
- Produced by: Greg Reitman; Dale Rosenbloom; Darius Fisher; Daniel Assael; Rebecca Harrell; Greg Reitman
- Starring: Josh Tickell; Richard Branson; Sheryl Crow; Larry David; Larry Hagman; Woody Harrelson; Van Jones; Robert Kennedy Jr. Neil Young
- Cinematography: James Mulryan
- Edited by: Tina Imahara; Michael Horwitz
- Music by: Mike Meeker; Ryan Demaree
- Distributed by: Intention Media
- Release date: January 2008 (Sundance Film Festival)
- Running time: 112 minutes
- Country: United States
- Language: English

Fuel (previously called Fields of Fuel) is a 2008 documentary film directed by Josh Tickell and produced by Greg Reitman, Dale Rosenbloom, Daniel Assael, Darius Fisher, and Rebecca Harrell Tickell.

It won the audience award at the 2008 Sundance Film Festival. The DVD was released on June 22, 2010.

== Editing ==
According to director Josh Tickell, since its appearance at the Sundance Film Festival, the film has gone through major editing changes and additions. The name was changed from Fields of Fuel to Fuel. This edited film is a re-cut of the same film with 45 minutes of new material in its total 112-minute running time.

== Reception ==
The film has a 72% approval rating from critics on Rotten Tomatoes based on 18 reviews.

== Awards ==
- 2008 Sundance Film Festival Winner - Audience Award
- 2008 AFI Dallas Film Festival Winner - Current Energy Earth Friendly Award
- 2008 Sedona Film Festival Winner - Most Compelling Documentary
- 2008 Sedona Film Festival Winner - Best Screenwriting
- 2008 Santa Cruz Film Festival - Producer's Award
- 2008 Gaia Film Festival Winner - Audience Award, Best Documentary
- Nominated – 61st Writers Guild of America Awards - Best Documentary Screenplay
