= Common Ground (2023 film) =

Documentary about ethical regenerative farming

- Directed by: Joshua Tickell; Rebecca Harrell Tickell
- Starring: Laura Dern; Jason Momoa; Donald Glover; Woody Harrelson; Rosario Dawson
- Release date: 2023
- Language: English

Common Ground is a 2023 documentary film, streaming on Amazon Prime Video, about ethical regenerative farming. It features Laura Dern, Jason Momoa, Donald Glover, Woody Harrelson and Rosario Dawson. It was directed by Joshua Tickell and Rebecca Harrell Tickell.

In January 2025, it was acquired by Amazon Prime Video and it appeared on the streaming service on the following Earth Day, April 22.

The film won the International Green Film Award by Cinema for Peace in 2024.

== Criticisms ==
The documentaries faced criticism by Vox author Kenny Torrella for promoting regenerative agriculture with claims described as overly simplistic, scientifically dubious, and akin to "magical thinking". The critique notes that the films lack skeptical perspectives, ignore complex agricultural tradeoffs, and present a "nostalgic utopianism." Specific claims, such as the world having only "60 harvests remaining" or that improved soil health clearly leads to healthier humans, are presented as misleading or lacking clear scientific consensus.

The central assertion that regenerative agriculture can sequester enough carbon to solve the climate crisis is deemed "highly improbable" by Torrella who points to the lack of accurate carbon measurement tools, doubts about the sequestration effectiveness and permanence (especially concerning no-till farming), and diminishing sequestration rates over time (a position that reflects findings by neutral scientific organisations such as the Food Climate Research Network). The film ignores significant drawback: regenerative practices, particularly grass-finished cattle, require substantially more land than conventional methods. Finally, the documentary is faulted for omitting expert consensus on more effective climate solutions for agriculture, such as reducing meat and dairy production, and for promoting regenerative agriculture as a simple fix that potentially crowds out more evidence-based approaches.

== See also ==
- Kiss the Ground – 2020 documentary film
