= On Sacred Ground (film) =

- Directed by: Josh Tickell; Rebecca Harrell Tickell
- Written by: Josh Tickell; Rebecca Harrell Tickell; William Mapother
- Produced by: Josh Tickell; Rebecca Harrell Tickell; Joanelle Romero; William Mapother; Wesley Hartshorn
- Starring: William Mapother; Amy Smart; David Arquette; Frances Fisher; Kerry Knuppe; Mariel Hemingway
- Cinematography: Simon Balderas
- Edited by: Anthony Ellison; Ryan A. Nichols
- Music by: Ryan Demaree
- Production companies: Big Picture Ranch; Concourse Media; Slated
- Distributed by: Shout! Studios
- Release date: November 12, 2022 (Red Nation)
- Running time: 85 minutes
- Country: United States
- Language: English

On Sacred Ground is a 2022 American drama film written by Josh Tickell, Rebecca Harrell Tickell and William Mapother, directed by Josh Tickell and Rebecca Harrell Tickell, and starring William Mapother, Amy Smart, David Arquette, Frances Fisher, Kerry Knuppe and Mariel Hemingway. Based on true events, the film is a dramatization of the Dakota Access Pipeline protests.

== Plot ==
A journalist and oil company executive find themselves on opposite sides during the construction of the Dakota Access Pipeline running through the Standing Rock Indian Reservation.

== Cast ==
- William Mapother as Daniel McKinney
- Amy Smart as Julie
- David Arquette as Elliot
- Kerry Knuppe as Mika
- Mariel Hemingway as Marion
- David Midthunder as Terry
- Irene Bedard as Mary Singing Crow
- Frances Fisher as Ricky

== Production ==
In May 2022, it was announced that Shout! Studios acquired North American distribution rights to the film.

== Release ==
The film premiered at the Red Nation Film Festival on November 12, 2022. Then it was released in select theaters and On Demand on January 13, 2023.

== Reception ==
The film has a 29% rating on Rotten Tomatoes based on seven reviews. Erick Massoto of Collider graded the film a C−. Bobby LePire of Film Threat rated the film an 8 out of 10.

Joe Leydon of Variety gave the film a negative review, calling it "a movie that is not merely disappointingly uneven, but irredeemably unbalanced."
