= The Big Fix (2012 film) =

- Directed by: Josh Tickell; Rebecca Harrell Tickell
- Written by: Johnny O'Hara; Josh Tickell
- Produced by: Rebecca Harrell Tickell; Darius Fisher; Tim Robbins; Jason Mraz
- Starring: Josh Tickell; Rebecca Harrell Tickell; Peter Fonda; Amy Smart
- Cinematography: Marc Levy
- Edited by: Tina Imahara; Sean P. Keenan
- Music by: Ryan Michael Demaree
- Distributed by: GoDigital Media Group
- Release date: June 19, 2012
- Running time: 90 minutes
- Country: United States
- Language: English

The Big Fix is a 2012 documentary film about two filmmakers, Josh and Rebecca Tickell, as they travel along the coast of the Gulf of Mexico meeting the residents whose lives were changed by the Deepwater Horizon oil spill. The film argues that BP has utilized the oil dispersant Corexit in the Gulf to create the illusion that the Louisiana beaches are safe and the water (and seafood) uncontaminated.

The film briefly features an interview with G4S security guard Omar Mateen, who four years later would perpetrate the 2016 Orlando nightclub shooting.

== Participants ==
- Jean-Michel Cousteau
- Jeff Goodell
- Chris Hedges
- Bobby Jindal
- David Korten
- Jim McDermott

== Festivals and awards ==
- Official Selection – Cannes Film Festival (The Big Fix was the only US documentary chosen as an Official Selection at the Cannes Film Festival in 2011.)
- Winner, Best Documentary – Italian Environmental Film Festival
- Winner, Best Documentary – International Water and Film Festival
- Opening Night Movie – New Orleans Film Festival
- Official Selection – Durban Film Festival
- Official Selection – Best of Fest – IDFA
- Official Selection – Rio de Janeiro Film Festival
- Official Selection – Boulder International Film Festival
- Official Selection – Sedona Film Festival
- Official Selection – DC Environmental Film Festival
- Official Selection – Hawaii International Film Festival
- Official Selection – Tallahassee Film Festival
- Official Selection – Bergen International Film Festival
