= The Planet (film) =

- There is only one planet and it has its limits
- Directed by: Johan Söderberg, Michael Stenberg, Linus Torell
- Music by: David Österberg, Johan Söderberg
- Release date: 2006
- Running time: 82 minutes
- Countries: Sweden; Norway; Denmark
- Language: English

The Planet is a Swedish documentary film on environmental issues, released in 2006. The film was made by Michael Stenberg, Johan Söderberg and Linus Torell for the big screen and was shot in English to reach an international audience. It includes interviews with 29 environmental scientists and experts including Stephen Peake, Herman Daly, Lester Brown, Gretchen Daily, Mathis Wackernagel, Norman Myers, Jill Jäger, George Monbiot, Robert Costanza, Will Steffen, and Jared Diamond.

At 8 pm GMT on 21 March 2007, as part of the OXDOX:MK documentary film festival, it became the first-ever simultaneous round the world screening of a film. After the screening, a panel of leading environmental experts answered questions from around the world from the Berrill Lecture Theatre at The Open University, England.

== TV adaptation ==
The TV adaptation consists of four episodes of 50–60 minutes:

- Part 1: The Earth System
- Part 2: Nature's Resources
- Part 3: Humankind and Nature
- Part 4: Choices and Consequences

== Awards ==
- Winner, Best Documentary – Italian Environmental Film Festival, 2007
