= List of awards and nominations received by Woody Harrelson =

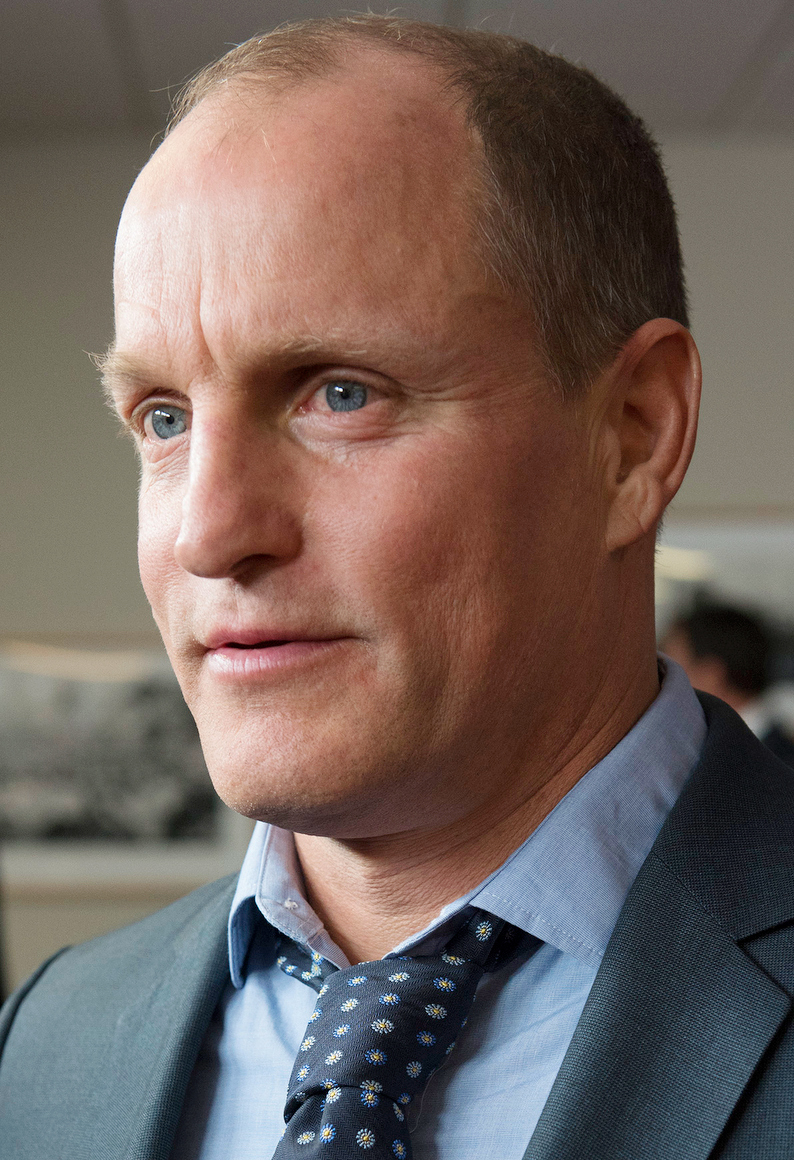
Harrelson in 2016

Woody Harrelson is an American actor and playwright. He first became known for his role as bartender Woody Boyd on the NBC sitcom Cheers (1985–1993), for which he won a Primetime Emmy Award for Outstanding Supporting Actor in a Comedy Series from a total of five nominations. He has also received three Academy Award nominations: Best Actor for The People vs. Larry Flynt (1996) and Best Supporting Actor for The Messenger (2009) and Three Billboards Outside Ebbing, Missouri (2017).

== Major Associations ==
=== Academy Awards ===
| Year | Category | Nominated work | Result | Ref. |
|---|---|---|---|---|
| 1997 | Best Actor | The People vs. Larry Flynt | Nominated | |
| 2010 | Best Supporting Actor | The Messenger | Nominated | |
| 2018 | Best Supporting Actor | Three Billboards Outside Ebbing Missouri | Nominated | |

=== BAFTA Awards ===
| Year | Category | Nominated work | Result | Ref. |
|---|---|---|---|---|
| 2018 | Best Actor in a Supporting Role | Three Billboards Outside Ebbing Missouri | Nominated | |

=== Emmy Awards ===
| Year | Category | Nominated work | Result | Ref. |
Primetime Emmy Awards
| 1987 | Outstanding Supporting Actor in a Comedy Series | Cheers | Nominated | |
| 1988 | Outstanding Supporting Actor in a Comedy Series | Cheers | Nominated | |
| 1989 | Outstanding Supporting Actor in a Comedy Series | Cheers | Won | |
| 1990 | Outstanding Supporting Actor in a Comedy Series | Cheers | Nominated | |
| 1991 | Outstanding Supporting Actor in a Comedy Series | Cheers | Nominated | |
| 1999 | Outstanding Guest Actor in a Comedy Series | Frasier | Nominated | |
| 2012 | Outstanding Lead Actor in a Limited Series or Movie | Game Change | Nominated | |
| 2014 | Outstanding Drama Series | True Detective | Nominated | |
| 2014 | Outstanding Lead Actor in a Drama Series | True Detective | Nominated | |
| 2024 | Outstanding Limited or Anthology Series | True Detective | Nominated | |

=== Golden Globe Awards ===
| Year | Category | Nominated work | Result | Ref. |
|---|---|---|---|---|
| 1997 | Best Actor in a Motion Picture - Drama | The People vs. Larry Flynt | Nominated | |
| 2010 | Best Supporting Actor - Motion Picture | The Messenger | Nominated | |
| 2013 | Best Supporting Actor - Television | Game Change | Nominated | |
| 2015 | Best Actor in a Limited Series or Movie | True Detective | Nominated | |
| 2024 | Best Actor in a Limited Series or Movie | White House Plumbers | Nominated | |

=== Screen Actors Guild Awards ===
| Year | Category | Nominated work | Result | Ref. |
|---|---|---|---|---|
| 1997 | Outstanding Actor in a Leading Role | The People vs. Larry Flynt | Nominated | |
| 2008 | Outstanding Cast in a Motion Picture | No Country for Old Men | Won | |
| 2010 | Outstanding Actor in a Supporting Role | The Messenger | Nominated | |
| 2013 | Outstanding Actor in a Limited Series or Movie | Game Change | Nominated | |
| 2015 | Outstanding Actor in a Drama Series | True Detective | Nominated | |
| 2018 | Outstanding Cast in a Motion Picture | Three Billboards Outside Ebbing Missouri | Won | |
| 2018 | Outstanding Actor in a Supporting Role | Three Billboards Outside Ebbing Missouri | Nominated | |

== Miscellaneous awards ==
| Year | Award | Nominated work | Result |
|---|---|---|---|
| 1987 | American Comedy Award for Funniest Newcomer - Male or Female | Cheers | Won |
| 1990 | American Comedy Award for Funniest Supporting Male Performer in a TV Series | Cheers | Nominated |
| 1992 | MTV Movie Award for Best Kiss (shared with Rosie Perez) | White Men Can't Jump | Nominated |
| 1992 | MTV Movie Award for Best On-Screen Duo (shared with Wesley Snipes) | White Men Can't Jump | Nominated |
| 1993 | MTV Movie Award for Best Kiss (shared with Demi Moore) | Indecent Proposal | Won |
| 1993 | Golden Raspberry Award for Worst Supporting Actor | Indecent Proposal | Won |
| 1994 | MTV Movie Award for Best Kiss (shared with Juliette Lewis) | Natural Born Killers | Nominated |
| 1994 | MTV Movie Award for Best On-Screen Duo (shared with Juliette Lewis) | Natural Born Killers | Nominated |
| 2006 | Gotham Independent Film Award for Best Ensemble Cast | A Prairie Home Companion | Nominated |
| 2008 | Saturn Award for Best Supporting Actor | Transsiberian | Nominated |
| 2009 | Independent Spirit Award for Best Supporting Male | The Messenger | Won |
| 2009 | National Board of Review Award for Best Supporting Actor | The Messenger | Won |
| 2009 | San Diego Film Critics Society Award for Body of Work | The Messenger | Won |
| 2009 | Broadcast Film Critics Association Award for Best Supporting Actor | The Messenger | Nominated |
| 2009 | Chicago Film Critics Association Award for Best Supporting Actor | The Messenger | Nominated |
| 2009 | Detroit Film Critics Society Award for Best Supporting Actor | The Messenger | Nominated |
| 2009 | Houston Film Critics Society Award for Best Supporting Actor | The Messenger | Nominated |
| 2009 | Satellite Award for Best Supporting Actor - Motion Picture | The Messenger | Nominated |
| 2009 | San Diego Film Critics Society Award for Best Supporting Actor | The Messenger | Nominated |
| 2009 | Washington D.C. Area Film Critics Association for Best Supporting Actor | The Messenger | Won |
| 2009 | San Diego Film Critics Society Award for Body of Work | Zombieland | Won |
| 2009 | Scream Award for Best Ensemble | Zombieland | Won |
| 2009 | Detroit Film Critics Society Award for Best Supporting Actor | Zombieland | Nominated |
| 2009 | Detroit Film Critics Society Award for Best Cast | Zombieland | Nominated |
| 2009 | Saturn Award for Best Supporting Actor | Zombieland | Nominated |
| 2009 | Scream Award for Best Horror Actor | Zombieland | Nominated |
| 2009 | San Diego Film Critics Society Award | Body of Work | Won |
| 2011 | African American Film Critics Association Award for Best Actor | Rampart | Won |
| 2011 | Independent Spirit Award for Best Male Lead | Rampart | Nominated |
| 2011 | Satellite Award for Best Actor in a Motion Picture | Rampart | Nominated |
| 2012 | Critics' Choice Television Award for Best Actor in a Movie/Miniseries | Game Change | Nominated |
| 2015 | Satellite Award for Best Actor – Television Series Drama | True Detective | Nominated |

== Honorary awards ==
| Year | Organizations | Award | Result |
|---|---|---|---|
| 2026 | Sarajevo Film Festival | Honorary Heart of Sarajevo Award | Honored |

== See also ==
- Woody Harrelson filmography
