= Love Thy Nature =

- Theatrical poster
- Directed by: Sylvie Rokab
- Written by: Sylvie Rokab; Fernanda Rossi; Elaine Souda
- Story by: Sylvie Rokab; Fernanda Rossi
- Produced by: Sylvie Rokab; David Garfield Roland; Tamra Raven; Elaine Souda
- Narrated by: Liam Neeson
- Cinematography: Sylvie Rokab; Rohan Chitrakar; Eriberto Almeida Jr. Rob Sweeney
- Edited by: Sylvie Rokab
- Music by: François Paul-Aïche
- Production company: In the Light Productions
- Distributed by: In The Light Productions; Passion River Films; Kanopy; The Video Project
- Release dates: October 18, 2014 (Hollywood Film Festival); April 22, 2016
- Running time: 76 minutes (Note: Love Thy Nature has several alternative version for educational versions, including a 25 minute one and 59 minute one)
- Country: United States
- Language: English (Note: Love Thy Nature was subtitled in French, German, Portuguese, and Spanish)

Love Thy Nature is a 2014 documentary film directed by Sylvie Rokab and narrated by Liam Neeson. The film underwent development in the mid-2000s, with production lasting nearly a decade. Produced and distributed by in the Light Productions, the first version of the film premiered on 18 October 2014 at the Hollywood Film Festival, with a film festival run throughout 2014 and 2015 and a theatrical run with the final version of the film in 2016. It has had over 300 theatrical and community screenings in 140 cities in 16 countries, earned 27 awards, and was covered in 28 publications.

The film has been used to help advance local environmental organizations' mission as well as grow the nature-connecting movement. The film team partnered with film screenings' hosts to create "view and do" events, offering audience members the opportunity to engage in a nature program following the screening of the film. Rokab expanded this concept by creating Love Thy Nature Journeys with expeditions and workshops which start with the screening of the film and then transitions into activities guiding attendees in the wilderness for nature communion and forest therapy.

== Synopsis ==
An award-winning film narrated by Liam Neeson, Love Thy Nature points to how deeply we’ve lost touch with nature and takes viewers on a cinematic journey through the beauty and intimacy of our relationship with the natural world. The film shows that a renewed connection with nature is key both to our health and the health of our planet.

Neeson voices “Sapiens”, who is portrayed as believing that humans have transcended nature.Yet, “Biomimicry” scientists look to the natural world for the inventions, social ecologists examine how nature restores communities, and doctors are finding new ways in which nature heals the body, mind, and brain.

The film's mission is to show how a renewed connection with nature is critical to one's personal health and the health of our planet. Sapiens' journey reveals how a relationship with nature ignites a sense of meaning and wonder so profound that it touches the very core of what it means to be human.

== Cast and crew ==
=== Cast ===
- Liam Neeson as Sapiens (voice), the narrative character of the film.

Interviewees

- Dayna Baumeister is a researcher, design consultant, author, public speaker and co-founder of Biomimicry 3.8 and the Biomimicry Guild. Her extensive Biomimicry research work resulted in establishing the first Biomimicry Professional Certification Program.
- Brian Swimme is a cosmologist, CIIS professor, and Director of the Center for the Story of the Universe. He is known for his work which includes a series of educational videos, authoring several published books, and hosting and writing the PBS film Journey of the Universe.
- Andy Lipkis is the founder and CEO of TreePeople, a non-profit dedicated to emphasizing the importance of maintaining natural surroundings in urban areas throughout Los Angeles County.
- Duane Elgin is a NASA consultant, social scientist, public speaker, and author. Through his work, he has emphasized on looking deeper into the trends transforming the world.
- Stephen R. Kellert was a board member of Biological Capital, co-founder and consultant of Environmental Capital Partner, Yale University professor and scholar, and author. He is credited as being a leading authority on environmental conservation movements.
- Evon Peter is an indigenous leader, who is the Vice Chancellor for Rural, Community and Native Education at UAF and co-founder of the Native Movement.
- Jean Shinoda Bolen is a psychiatrist, Jungian analyst, author, and public speaker. She has authored 10 books with over eighty foreign translations along with appearing in Oscar-winning Women – for America, for the World (1986).
- Jay Harman is an Australian Biomimicry Inventor, credited as a pioneer of biomimicry. His designed are a part of a permanent collection at the New York Museum of Modern Art.
- Elisabet Sahtouris is an evolution biologist, futurist, author, and public speaker. Her work has credited for showing the significance of biological systems in globalization and government.
- Julian Walker is an American yoga instructor, retreat coordinator, author, and blogger, whose recent work has made connections between psychology and neurosciences to spirituality and body care.
- Alex Zaphiris is a family integrative physician based in San Francisco, CA. Zaphiris helps those who struggle with mental health and addition, primarily. She puts an emphasis on getting to "the root" of one's issue through alternative therapies
- Philip Barr is an American integrative medical physician who emphasizes on internal and integrative healing.

=== Crew ===
Love Thy Nature was directed and edited by filmmaker Sylvie Rokab, who also served as a cinematographer, writer, and producer. Eriberto Almeida Jr. and Rohan Chitrakar worked alongside Rokab as cinematographers while Fernanda Rossi and Elaine Souda worked on story development and script editing, respectively. Darius Fisher supervised digital and visual effects. Fisher, Sheila Laffey, Patrick Rokab, Andreas Gilb, Suzanne Gazda, and Jennifer Ingle served as associate producers. Mauro Contaldi and Keith English created the animation for the film.

François Paul-Aïche is the composer for the entire original soundtrack for Love Thy Nature. Lisbeth Scott is the composer for the film's trailer. In the credits, the song "Voices From The Past (Club Mix)" as performed by Ginkgo Garden and composed by Eddy F. Mueller was used as a courtesy of Sequoia Records and Earth Vision Music.

== Production ==
Since the time I was that kid running in the forest, I’ve been fed, restored, and awed by the natural world. Love Thy Nature is my homage to its magic, power, and genius. And it’s my gift to you. I hope it will inform and inspire you, your family, school, and community, so that we can help transform and restore our precious world – from the inside out.

— Sylvie Rokab, Director's Statement

=== Background and development ===
Director Sylvie Rokab was born in Rio de Janeiro, Brazil to French and Italian parents, both originally from Egypt. Since a young age, Rokab's interest in the natural world was encouraged by her parents. Following her devastation at seeing the world's rapid destruction, Rokab relocated to the United States and became a wildlife cinematographer and filmmaker. After turning down an offer to direct a televised docu-series due to their negative portrayal of nature, Rokab wanted to make a film that would instead cause "[viewers to] feel compelled to explore and commune with nature". Rokab then worked on developing the story for Love Thy Nature, in hopes to make a project that would connect people to nature and promote personal and social transformation.

=== Filming ===
Filming began in October 2007, with Rokab directing interviews with experts at the Bioneers conference in San Rafael, California.

==== Film locations ====
The film was shot at a variety of locations internationally, with primary production being mainly located in Los Angeles County, California.

- United States
  California (Los Angeles, Santa Monica, Malibu, Los Olivos, San Francisco, San Rafael, Mill Valley, Muir Woods National Monument)
  Alaska (Prince William Sound, Katmai National Park, Anchorage, Seward)
  New York (New York City)
  Florida (Miami, Miami-Dade beaches, Jonathan Dickison Park, Everglades National Park)
  Connecticut (New Haven)
  Hawaii (Hilo Forest Reserve, Kailua-Kona)
- Brazil
  Rio de Janeiro (city of Rio de Janeiro, Corrêas, Vassouras, Visconde de Mauá)
  Minas Gerais (Maromba)
- Namibia
  Etosha
  Sossusvlei – Namib desert
  Omaheke (Note: Production services in Namibia were provided by Namib Films)
- British Virgin Islands
  Virgin Gorda

== Promotion and release ==
Corinne Bourdeau, of 360 communications, was a leading proponent in organizing the film's outreach promotion.

=== Screenings ===
Love Thy Nature had its world premiere at the Hollywood Film Festival in October 2014, screened at a series of film festivals as well as community screenings and was entered into award competitions. The film saw a limited theatrical release in 2016, primarily in North American movie theatres, as organized by Theatrical Bookings Manager Amy Segal

The film was the recipient of the Mid Atlantic Arts Foundation's "On-Screen-In-Person" grant, which resulted in the film being shown in 10 Mid-Atlantic cities. Millersville University embraced Love Thy Nature's "view and do" model and organized a series of nine events following and preceding the film screening stimulating students' likening of the nature-connection movement. These events included bird watching, nature journaling, sustainability lectures, a panel discussion, in addition to the film screening followed by a Q&A with Rokab, attended by 330 audience members.

During screening events, a slew of speakers made guest appearances, among them Natural Resources Defense Council's Joel Reynolds, Amazon Watch founder Atossa Soltani, actress Alexandra Paul, author and marine biologist Wallace J. Nichols, PhD, and Mom's Clean Airforce strategist Trisha Sheehan, as well as interviewees from the film.

=== Partnerships ===
From the onset of the distribution effort, Love Thy Nature formed partnerships with NGOs, public institutions, schools and universities, land trusts, spiritual groups, and activists. The film screenings became opportunities for these organizations to present their programs, acquire volunteers, expand their membership, and even fundraise with audience members – strengthening their mission and impact.

Screenings went beyond only watching a movie, they became an opportunity to engage with like-minded people, discover local environmental groups and join nature-connecting programs for adults and children. For viewers who joined our "view and do" events, the screenings were followed by nature activities that ranged from visiting an organic garden in Santa Monica, California, to planting trees on a river bank in Millersville, Pennsylvania, to joining a shaman on a hike in Sedona, Arizona.

The film's grass roots efforts include partnerships with organizations such as the Sierra Club, The Wilderness Society, National Park Service, TreePeople, Biomimicry Institute, NRDC, Wild Conservation Film Festival, Green City Challenge, Earth Day Initiative, Bioneers, Centers for Spiritual Living, Land Trust Alliance, Moms Clean Air Force, HAT, AORE, Animals Valley, Association of Nature and Forest Therapy, and Wild Life Center.

=== Distribution and outreach ===
Following the completion of filming Love Thy Nature, Rokab sought the help of Hybrid Distribution Consultant Peter Broderick who helped her develop a "5-year plan" to use her film to contribute to the Nature Connecting movement.

After initial festival screenings, the film had a theatrical run. The film team expanded to include outreach efforts – currently spearheaded by Emma Piper-Burket – and Love Thy Nature became available on the DIY platform Tugg Inc., which enables individuals to host film screenings at their local cinemas or community venues of their choice. The Video Project is the educational distributor of the film for libraries and schools and Kanopy handles digital educational distribution worldwide. Passion River Films distributed the film to digital platforms Amazon, iTunes, Google Play, Vimeo, and Vudu.

Skeye TV In-flight entertainment distributes the film on commercial airlines including American Airlines, Lufthansa, Swissair, Air Canada, Turkish Airlines, Latam, Emirates, Bangkok Airways, Egypt Air, Cathay Pacific, Qatar Airways and Iberia Airlines.

== Reception ==
=== Critical response ===
In The New York Times, Neil Genzlinger noted that Love Thy Nature advocates redefining the relationship between humans and the natural world. Marcia G. Yerman of The Huffington Post praised the film for its combination of "visceral cinematography" and "thoughtful interviews", as well as its casting of Neeson as the voice of Sapiens. Village Voice wrote "Love Thy Nature tackles questions of our role on Earth, our part in its care and destruction (as well as our own health), and how we might refrain from destroying it... Rokab alternates between hopeful and grim prognoses, mercifully providing a measure of hope and possibility that many films of this ilk do not". The Los Angeles Times wrote how director Rokab "sees the light at the end of the tunnel through a biological revolution focusing on biomimicry... in which sustainable technology is informed by nature's models and designs..” Broward Palm Beach New Times describes the Rokab's initiative for the film being "[to] make a movie that examines the primal connection between humans and nature".

On Rotten Tomatoes, it has an approval rating of 30% based on reviews from 10 critics. One reviewer cited how Rokab "finds just the right balance between entertaining you while provoking you emotionally and intellectually. Never... too exhausting, heavy or dull." Laurel Busby of the Palisades News dubbed the film a "visually stunning and gently moving piece that reminds viewers how necessary a connection to nature is both for our species as a whole and each individual person". An Organic Conversation and Educational Media Reviews also gave the film positive reviews, with the latter calling it "a very inspiring and informative documentary that offers an immense contribution to public understanding of nature and emphasizes the significance of the reconceptualizing of human attitudes toward the natural world."

=== Accolades ===
List of awards and nominations
Group	Year	Category	Recipients	Result
Global Film Awards	2014	Humanitarian Award (Outstanding Achievement)	Love Thy Nature	Won
Accolade Competition	2014	Feature Documentary (excellence)	Love Thy Nature	Won
Accolade Competition	2014	Best Cinematography (excellence)	Eriberto Almeida Jr., Rohan Chitrakar, and Sylvie Rokab	Won
Accolade Competition	2014	Best Voice Over Talent (excellence)	Liam Neeson	Won
IndieFEST Awards	2014	Best of Show – Documentary Feature	Love Thy Nature	Won
Eugene International Film Festival	2014	Best Social Benefit Documentary	Love Thy Nature	Won
Indie Spirit Film Festival	2014	Best Documentary (audience award)	Love Thy Nature	Won
Maverick Award	2014	Best Special Effects	Darius Fisher	Won
Fort Lauderdale Film Festival	2014	Best Documentary	Love Thy Nature	Won
LA Femme Film Festival	2014	Best Focused Documentary	Love Thy Nature	Won
International Movie Awards	2015	Best Documentary Feature (Platinum)	Love Thy Nature	Won
International Movie Awards	2015	Best Director (Platinum)	Sylvie Rokab	Won
International Movie Awards	2015	Best Editor (Platinum)	Sylvie Rokab	Won
International Movie Awards	2015	Best Visual Effect (Platinum)	Darius Fisher	Won
International Movie Awards	2015	Best Music Director	François Paul-Aïche	Won
International Movie Awards	2015	Best Cinematography (Gold)	Eriberto Almeida Jr, Rohan Chitrakar, and Sylvie Rokab	Won
Richmond International Film Festival	2015	Best Cinematography (Outstanding Merit Award)	Love Thy Nature	Won
Cosmic Cine Film Festival	2015	Grand Jury Award (Cosmic Angel Award)	Love Thy Nature	Won
International Indie Film Awards	2015	Best Documentary Feature (Platinum)	Love Thy Nature	Won
International Indie Film Awards	2015	Best Cinematography (Platinum)	Eriberto Almeida Jr., Rohan Chitrakar, and Sylvie Rokab	Won
International Indie Film Awards	2015	Best Original Score (Platinum)	François Paul-Aïche	Won
International Indie Film Awards	2015	Best Title and Credit Design	Mauro Contaldi and Keith English	Won
Cinema Verde Film Festival	2015	Best of Show	Love Thy Nature	Won
Honolulu Film Awards	2016	Best Documentary	Love Thy Nature	Won
Alaska International Film Festival	2016	Denali Award	Love Thy Nature	Won
California Film Awards	2016	Best Documentary (Silver)	Love Thy Nature	Won
Planeta Doc Film Festival	2016	Planeta Doc Award	Love Thy Nature	Won

== Love Thy Nature Journeys ==
Love Thy Nature Journeys is an outgrowth of the Love Thy Nature "view and do" screening events, where the film's director Sylvie Rokab in partnership with hosts have led post-screening audience programs to cultivate nature connection.

With the expansion of these programs, Love Thy Nature Journeys also screens the film to audience members at multi-day expeditions and workshops to further deepen their immersion in the natural world.

Working with outreach producer Emma Piper-Burket, Sylvie Rokab will continue to screen the film internationally in 2020, while also organizing more audience-lead events, incorporating forms of Nature therapy inspired by the Japanese tradition of "Shinrin Yoku" loosely translated as "Forest Bathing."
