= Greg Reitman =

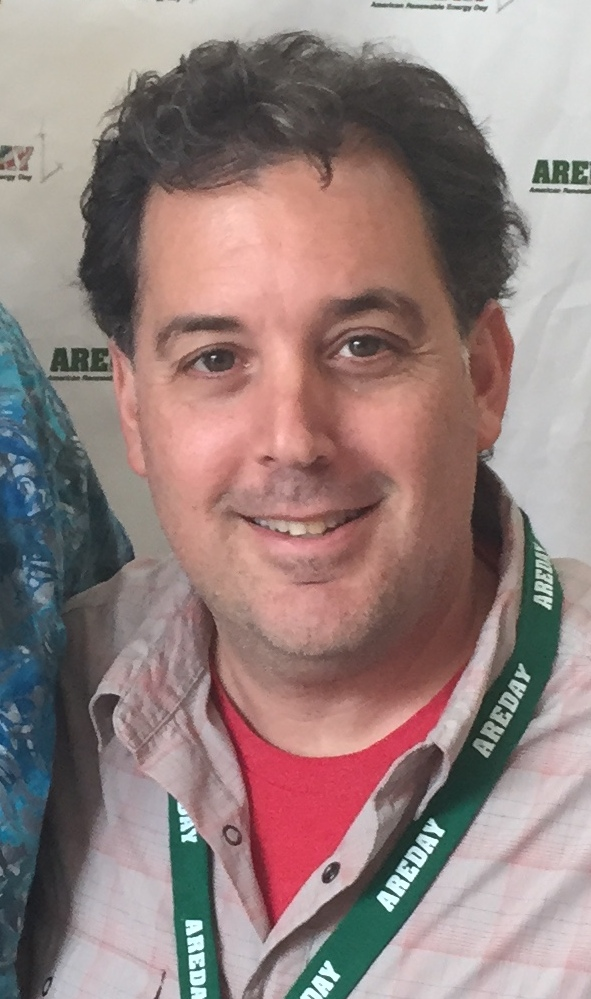
- Greg Reitman in 2015
- Born: May 10, 1971 (age 55); Long Island, New York, USA
- Education: University of Massachusetts at Amherst (BA)
- Occupations: Film director, producer, screenwriter, author
- Years active: 2000-present
- Website: www.GregReitman.com

Greg Reitman (May 10, 1971) is an American film director, producer, screenwriter, and author. He is best known for directing, producing and writing Hollywood’s Magical Island- Catalina (2003).

== Education ==
Reitman earned his Bachelor of Arts from the University of Massachusetts Amherst (1993) and he also holds a certificate in Film & Television, Marketing & Distribution from UCLA. He received a master's certificate in Creative Producing from Tel Aviv University, and has studied at Hokkaido University in Japan and the University of Florence in Italy.

== Career ==
Reitman's first feature film, Hollywood's Magical Island: Catalina, was narrated by Peter Coyote. His second feature film was Fuel. (The name was changed from Fields of Fuel to Fuel.)

His third feature film, Rooted in Peace, in 2016, debuted at the United Nations, won the New York Festival Best Feature Documentary, Impact Award for Excellence, released theatrically, and subsequently streamed on Amazon Prime, and iTunes. The film features Deepak Chopra, Donovan, Mike Love, David Lynch, Greg Reitman, Pete Seeger, and Archbishop Desmond Tutu.

In 2004, Reitman self-published the mini coffee table book Hollywood's Magical Island - Catalina. In 2016, following the release of the film Rooted in Peace, Llewellyn Publications published his book Rooted in Peace: An Inspiring Story of Finding Peace.

In 2008, after producing the documentary Fuel, Reitman was asked to chronicle climate change and the movement as a journalist first for The Environmentalist and then The Huffington Post. His environmental articles published include Chasing Ice - The Climate Debate Is Over; UN Launches Year of the Int’l Forest; Is Climate Change Reversible? Can Regenerative Agriculture Farming Solve the Climate Crisis?; “If a Tree Falls: A Story of the Earth Liberation Front”; Investigates the Making And Unraveling of a Radical Environmental Group; “Ode to Peace” to Resound Around the World on International Day of Peace; The Climate War Comes to Australia: The Great Barrier Reef; The man behind Earth Day Texas Trammel S Crow leads the nation honoring the 45th Anniversary of Earth Day; Your Brain on Ocean: Neuroscience and Ocean Exploration; Global Green kicks off Oscar Week with Singer/Songwriter Stevie Wonder; and Madécasse Chocolate Raises the Bar this Earth Day in providing Money for Madagascar Disaster Relief.

In 2014, Reitman was a speaker at the Aspen Renewable Energy Summit.

In 2019, Reitman joined NYU-Tisch as an adjunct professor teaching marketing and distribution .

== Blue Water Institute ==
In 2020, Reitman founded the Blue Water Institute, a non-profit conservation organization. He also launched the Blue Water Film Festival, an annual event in San Diego, California showcasing ocean, water, and nature content in various formats, including short films, narratives, documentaries, and animations.

== Bibliography ==
- Hollywood Isle: Catalina Island Picture Book (2003, Post Card USA, ISBN 978-0-61513-444-4)
- Rooted in Peace: An Inspiring Story of Finding Peace Within (2018, Blue Water Publishing, USA, ISBN 978-0-9769566-4-8)
