= Rebecca Harrell Tickell =

American actress (b. 1980)

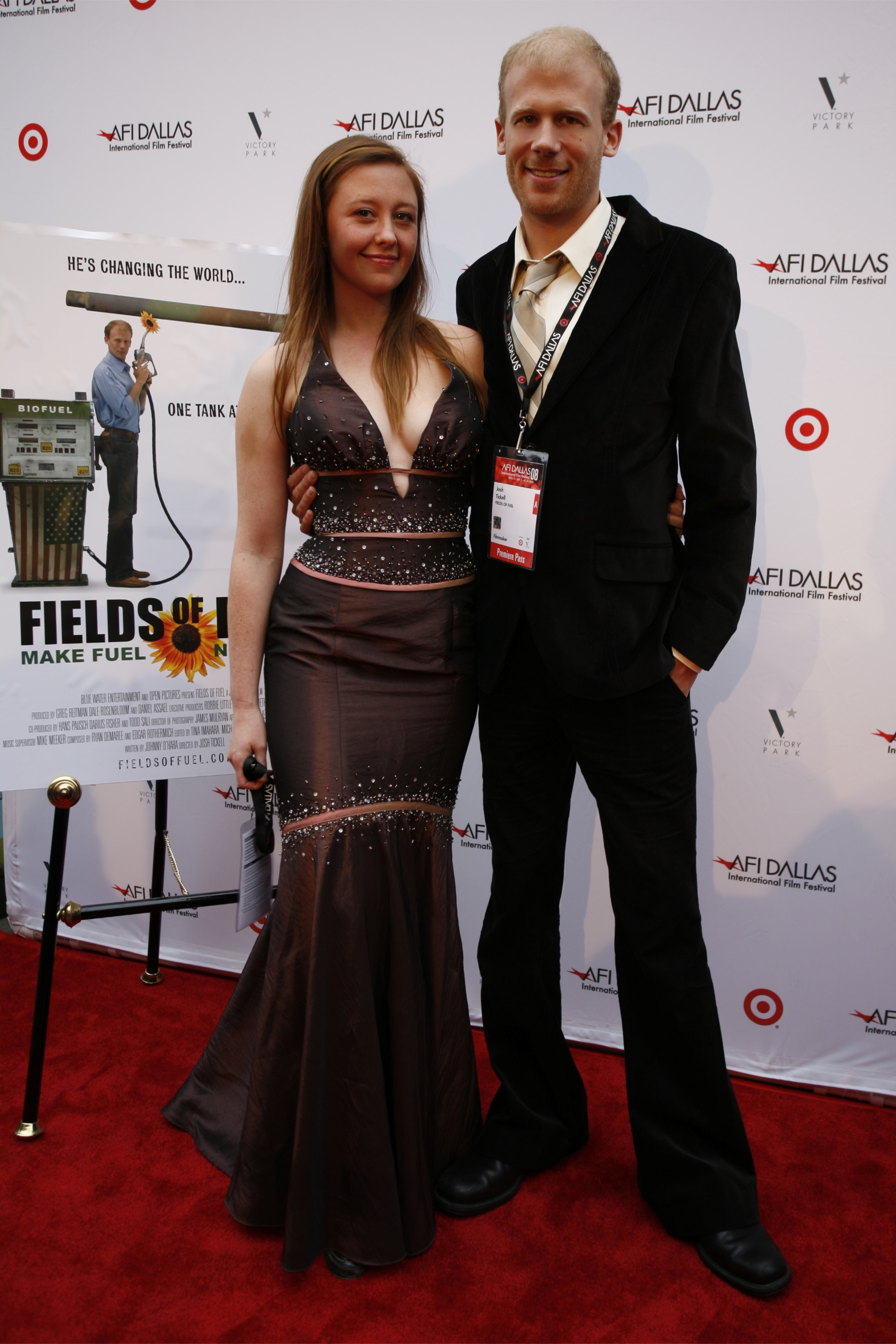
- Rebecca Harrell Tickell with husband Josh at AFI Dallas Film Festival, March 2010
- Born: Rebecca Reynolds Harrell; March 2, 1980 (age 46); Lancaster, Ohio
- Occupations: Filmmaker; Environmental Activist; Actress
- Years active: 1989–present
- Spouse: Josh Tickell (m. 2010)
- Children: 2
- Website: bigpictureranch.com greenplanet3d.com

Rebecca Reynolds Tickell (née Harrell; born March 2, 1980) is a producer, director, actress, singer, and environmental activist.

== Acting career ==
Rebecca Harrell starred in the Christmas film Prancer. She garnered a Young Artist Award nomination for Best Young Actress Starring in a Motion Picture. Movie critic Roger Ebert wrote of her performance that "what really redeems the movie, taking it out of the category of kiddie picture and giving it a heart and gumption, is the performance by a young actress named Rebecca Harrell, as Jessica. She's something. She has a troublemaker's look in her eye, and a round, pixie face that's filled with mischief. And she's smart—a plucky schemer who figures out things for herself and isn't afraid to act on her convictions".

She appeared in other films before putting her acting career aside to focus on environmental activism. She has been interviewed on Today, and by The New York Times, the Los Angeles Times, and The Washington Post.

== Environmental activist and filmmaker ==
In 2010, with husband Josh Tickell, Harrell Tickell documented the BP oil spill disaster in the Gulf of Mexico for their film The Big Fix. The film premiered as an "Official Selection" at the 2011 Cannes Film Festival. She became sick during the making of this film due to exposure to the mixture of oil and Corexit, which resulted in an irreversible skin condition.

The film received positive reviews, earning an 86% rating on the Rotten Tomatoes website. The New York Times compared the film to Silkwood and described The Big Fix as "an enraged exposé of the crimes of Big Oil". The Village Voice wrote, "The film's scope is staggering, including its detailed outlining of BP’s origins and fingerprints across decades of unrest in Iran. By doing smart, covert reporting that shames our news media, by interviewing uncensored journalists, by speaking with locals whose health has been destroyed, and by interviewing scientists who haven’t been bought by BP (many have, as the film illustrates), Fix stretches into a mandatory-viewing critique of widespread government corruption".

Traveling across the country, the Tickells educate people on different environmental issues, focusing on solutions, mainly algae-based biofuel. Their production company, Green Planet Productions, makes feature-length films and also specializes in video-centered campaigns for eco-minded companies and organizations.

She met her future husband while producing their first documentary film Fuel, which won the 2008 Sundance Film Festival Audience Award for Best Documentary and was shortlisted for the Academy Awards. The film also won awards from the Sedona, Santa Cruz, Clarion, AFI Dallas, and Gaia film festivals. She wrote and performed the song "Drive" for the film, which was shortlisted for a 2009 Academy Award for Best Original Song.

In 2014, Harrell Tickell directed and produced the documentary film Pump, which is funded by the Fuel Freedom Foundation, whose aim is to reduce American dependence on imported oil through replacing it with US-produced methanol from fossil gas, compressed natural gas (obtained by fracking) and biofuels. These solutions are promoted in Pump, which includes an interview with John Hofmeister, Advisory Board member of the Fuel Freedom Foundation and former President of Shell Oil Co. The film has The Los Angeles Times reviewed the film as "well reasoned and compelling". A Bloomberg Business editor posited that "This is the second feature about ending America's dependence on oil from the wife-husband team of Rebecca Harrell Tickell and Josh Tickell. They're tub-thumpers, but not shrill...what the Tickells have to share is valuable." The film has also been criticised for promoting fossil fuel production such as fracking and methanol from fossil gas, as well as biofuels, which are controversial due to their competition for agricultural land with food production and high emissions. For instance, maize ethanol is estimated to have a higher emissions impact than gasoline and diesel, once carbon opportunity costs are factored in, and substantially higher emissions than solar-powered electric vehicles.

The Tickells made a documentary about the 2016 Dakota Access Pipeline construction and associated protests on the Standing Rock Indian Reservation.

In 2020, Harrell Tickell and her husband Josh Tickell co-directed documentary Kiss the Ground, which is narrated by Woody Harrelson, and advocates for restoring soils through regenerative farming as a solution to climate change and soil degradation. The film has received criticism for its uncritical presentation of the ideas of Allan Savory, a controversial figure who has claimed that the carbon sequestration potential of holistic grazing is immune from empirical scientific study. A Food and Climate Research Network meta-study found that Savory's claims were "unrealistic" and very different from those issued by peer-reviewed studies. Kiss the Ground has also been criticised for its selective reference to Project Drawdown, a respected ranking of solutions with the most potential to combat climate change - the film points out that Project Drawdown states that 13.72 - 20.92 Gigatons CO2eq can be sequestered in soils between 2020 and 2050 due to “Managed Grazing” (0.46-0.70 Gigatons CO2eq per year), but omits to mention that this would only be enough to offset 7-11% of ruminant livestock's total estimated emissions of 6.4 gigatons CO2eq per year, and that Project Drawdown ranks a reduction in livestock numbers due to "Plant-rich diets" as having the 2nd highest potential of all solutions, with potential to reduce emissions by 78.33 - 103.11 Gigatons CO2eq between 2020 and 2050 (2.61-3.44 Gigatons CO2eq per year).

On Sacred Ground was released in January 2023.

== Algae fuel ==
The Tickells drove the first car powered by a blend of algae fuel across America. The car was dubbed the "Algaeus" and got 150 miles per gallon because of its extended battery pack and plug. The gasoline engine was unmodified. "We really view it, not to sound grandiose, as an Apollo mission for algae and renewable fuel" Harrell Tickell told Scientific American. With their convoy of alternatively powered vehicles, they drove across the country educating people about different green energy solutions.

== I'll Be The One Organization ==
Harrell Tickell co-founded the I'll Be The One Organization, a national non-profit with the vision of "clean air, clean food, and clean water for all, through shifting energy". It is dedicated to education and media around sustainable energy. Sir Richard Branson and Steve Howard participated in the launch of I'll Be The One's Green Curriculum for schools during Climate Week NYC.
