= Johan Söderberg =

Swedish film director and editor (born 1962)

Johan Olof Anders Söderberg (born 14 November 1962) is a Swedish film director and editor. He was considered part of the now terminated Swedish multimedia collective Lucky People Center.

Söderberg is recognized for the work he has done for Madonna: he edited both the "Hung Up" (2005) and "Sorry" (2006) music videos, as well as footage from her 2004 documentary I'm Going To Tell You A Secret; he directed the "Sorry Remix" video backdrop for the Confessions Tour in 2006 and co-directed the "Hey You" video (2007) with Marcus Lindkvist, which consists mostly of images from different cultures and global warming. He also remixed and directed the controversial concert video "Get Stupid" for the Sticky & Sweet Tour.

He also created the popular web video-hacked viral for the strand Read My Lips on Swedish TV show Kobra, which featured Tony Blair and George W. Bush lip-synching a love song. This technique was also used in the 2005 film The Voice.

== Filmography ==
=== Director ===
- Lucky People Center International (1998)
- Tokyo Noise (2002)
- "The Voice" (2005)
- The Planet (2006) – (Swedish: Planeten)

=== Editor ===
- Lucky People Center International (1998)
- Sacrificio: Who Betrayed Che Guevara? (2001)
- Tokyo Noise (2002)
- Spun (2002)
- Details (2003) – (Swedish: Detaljer)
- Surplus: Terrorized into Being Consumers (2003)
- I'm Going to Tell You a Secret (2005) - Madonna
- The Voice (2005)
- The Planet (2006) – (Swedish: Planeten)
- The Confessions Tour (2006) – Madonna
- Downloading Nancy (2007)
- Metropia (2009)
- Videocracy (2009)
- The MDNA Tour (2012) - Madonna - created and remixed "Nobody Knows Me" video interlude, recorded and released on the live album MDNA World Tour
