= Kiss the Ground =

2020 documentary film

- Directed by: Josh Tickell; Rebecca Harrell Tickell
- Narrated by: Woody Harrelson
- Production company: Big Picture Ranch
- Distributed by: Prime Video
- Release date: 2020
- Country: United States

Kiss the Ground is a 2020 Netflix original documentary film streaming on Amazon Prime Video. It focuses on regenerative agriculture; the movie profiles scientists, farmers and environmentalists as they explore the important role healthier soil plays in better human and planetary health. The film is narrated by actor Woody Harrelson and contains a celebrity cast that includes Gisele Bündchen, Tom Brady, and others.

Directed by Josh Tickell and Rebecca Harrell Tickell, the films are the result of a partnership between Kiss the Ground—a 501(c)(3) nonprofit organization headquartered in Los Angeles—and Big Picture Ranch, a film production company based in Ojai, California, northwest of L.A.

== Summary ==
The film critiques conventional agriculture, particularly tillage and pesticide use, for its negative environmental effects (soil erosion), role in climate change, and effects on human health. It praises regenerative agriculture as a remedy for improving soil health and carbon sequestration. Jason Mraz, Patricia Arquette, and Ian Somerhalder, among other celebrities involved in climate change activism, appear in interviews in the film.

== Reception ==
Critic Natalia Winkelman, reviewing Kiss the Ground for The New York Times, called it "frenetic but ultimately persuasive and optimistic" climate documentary, but criticized its "awkward" condemnation of the U.S. government's absence from climate initiatives without mentioning the Trump administration or any specifics. Kevin Crust of the Los Angeles Times called it "dense but nutritious."

Environmental scientist Ronald G. Amundson, in a commentary for the journal Biogeochemistry, praised "the motivation, enthusiasm, and intentions of the filmmakers and participants" in Kiss the Ground and the earlier Dirt! The Movie (2019), but objected to the films' narrative. Amundson wrote that "a hazy view or wish for a return to a past agricultural utopia ignores that there never was one" and that a global soil management system requires complex, fundamental changes involving many actors, rather than "magical thinking" that the problem will be solved simply by shifts in eating behaviors.

Becca Lucas of the California Climate & Agriculture Network (CalCAN), a group that promotes sustainable agriculture, criticized the film for a simplistic focus on soil depletion as a key to climate change mitigation, writing that the film's narrative propagated "the false and ultimately harmful dichotomy of 'good' versus 'bad' farmer." Lucas also wrote that the film's emphasis on consumer choices (such as composting) was misplaced, as these measures are insufficient to "address our climate crisis at the speed and scale we need." Lucas also criticized the film for failing to engage with the politics and public policy of sustainable agriculture, noting that it did not address programs available to farmers and made only a single brief reference to the 2015 United Nations Climate Change Conference (COP 21).

Agriculturalist and writer Michelle Miller, writing for Ag Daily, called the film a "missed opportunity"; she praised the focus on regenerative agriculture and combating food waste, but said that the upsides of the film were negated by its hyperbolic "insults and propaganda" directed at conventional agriculture, citing the filmmakers' denunciation of glyphosate, the film's likening of conventional agriculture to Auschwitz, and the film's funding by the Center for Food Safety. The documentary received the Best Documentary Feature award at the New York International Film Awards.

== Follow-up film: Common Ground ==
In 2023, the follow-up documentary, Common Ground, premiered. The cast list includes Woody Harrelson, Laura Dern, Jason Momoa, Rosario Dawson, Donald Glover, Ian Somerhalder and more. At the 2023 Tribeca Film Festival, the film won the Human/Nature Award.
