= Hempsters: Plant the Seed =

- Movie poster
- Directed by: Michael P. Henning
- Produced by: Diana Oliver
- Release date: October 8, 2010 (Bend Film Festival)
- Language: English

Hempsters: Plant the Seed is a 2010 Michael P. Henning documentary film concerning the legalization of hemp in the United States. It includes footage of the 1996 arrest of Woody Harrelson for planting four hemp seeds in an act of civil disobedience in Kentucky and the ensuing legal proceedings. Other activists, including Ralph Nader, Willie Nelson, Merle Haggard, Gatewood Galbraith and Julia Butterfly Hill are featured in the film. Also covered is eradication of cannabis at the Lakota Sioux reservation.

Director Michael P. Henning is also the founder and CEO of Sovran Films LLC in Dallas, Texas as well as being a public speaker and hemp activist. On May 29, 2021 Henning was a guest on the Ralph Nader Radio Hour with fellow hemp and Native American activist Winona LaDuke.

== See also ==
- Cannabis in Kentucky
