= Fuel Freedom Foundation =

The Fuel Freedom Foundation was officially launched in October 2012 by entrepreneurs Joseph Hollander and Eyal Aronoff. The foundation has a mission to end the United States' dependence on oil by removing barriers to competition in the transportation fuel market. The founders believe that fuel prices could be permanently reduced to below $1 a gallon.

The foundation's Board of Advisors includes former CIA Director R. James Woolsey, Jr., former New Mexico Governor Bill Richardson, former president of the Rockefeller Foundation Peter Goldmark, former dean of the University of Colorado's Graduate School of Public Policy Marshall Kaplan, former president of Shell Oil Company John Hofmeister and Co-director of the Institute for the Analysis of Global Security Gal Luft. The CEO is Joseph A. Cannon.

== Outlook and goals ==
The foundation believes that high oil prices are a result of a systematic monopoly. Contrary to a more traditional monopoly, where one company has a large enough market share to control prices, the oil-market is believed to be a monopolistic market because oil is the primary, and in most cases the only, fuel for transportation. These monopolistic forces create a situation where oil expenditures in the U.S. top $780 billion per year, more than twenty times the amount spent on coal.

According to the Foundation, outdated regulations prevent drivers from making simple modifications to their engines that would enable their cars to run on alternatives fuels, hence threatening oil's monopoly over the transportation fuel market. Updating these regulations to allow for current vehicles to modify their engines would allow for a near-term, widespread expansion of fuel choice for drivers. Ethanol, methanol, natural gas and electric cars are seen as viable replacement fuels to compete against oil in an open market. No one fuel is explicitly favored over the others but most people believe methanol made from natural gas holds the most promise to break oil's monopoly.
