= Josh Tickell =

American film director (born 1975)

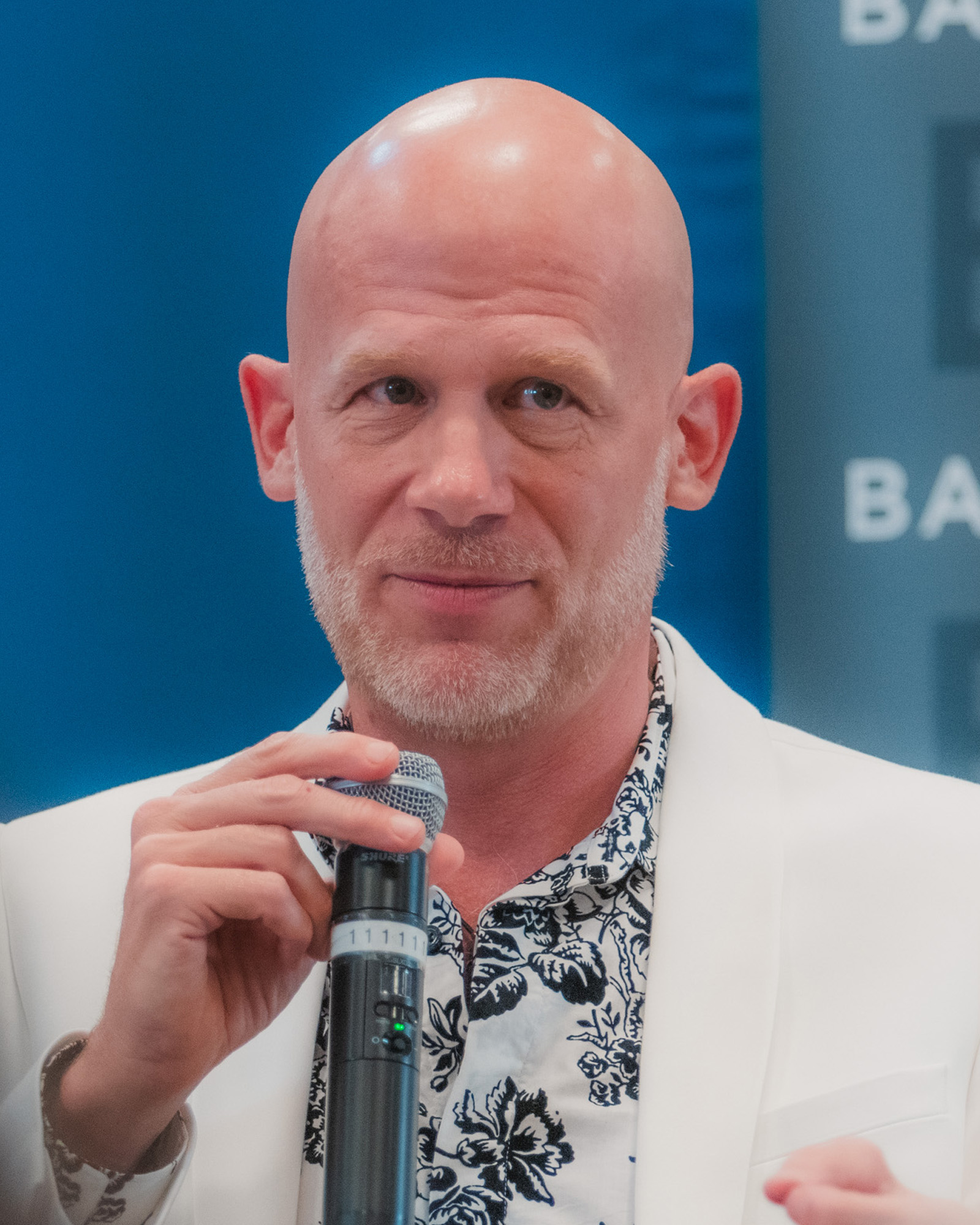
- Tickell in 2025
- Born: August 7, 1975 (age 51)
- Occupation: Film director
- Spouse: Rebecca Harrell Tickell (2010–present)

Josh Tickell (born August 7, 1975) is an American film director who specializes in movies with a social message. His first feature movie, Fuel won the Sundance Audience Award for Best Documentary, was released theatrically in the United States and became a global sensation gaining over 1 million viewers on Netflix, iTunes, Hulu and CNBC. The movie was screened in the White House for energy and environment staff working in the Obama administration.

== Life and career ==
Tickell directed the Cannes Film Festival movie, The Big Fix. The film explores possible connections between corporate and political malfeasance and the 2010 Gulf of Mexico oil spill. He went on to direct his third film, Freedom (2011), which focuses on alcohol fuel and aired on the SuperChannel in Canada. He completed his latest documentary, PUMP, and is currently in production on Good Fortune.

Tickell holds a master's degree in film from Florida State University's School of Motion Picture Arts.

Tickell is married to activist and former actress Rebecca Harrell Tickell, with whom he collaborates on his films.

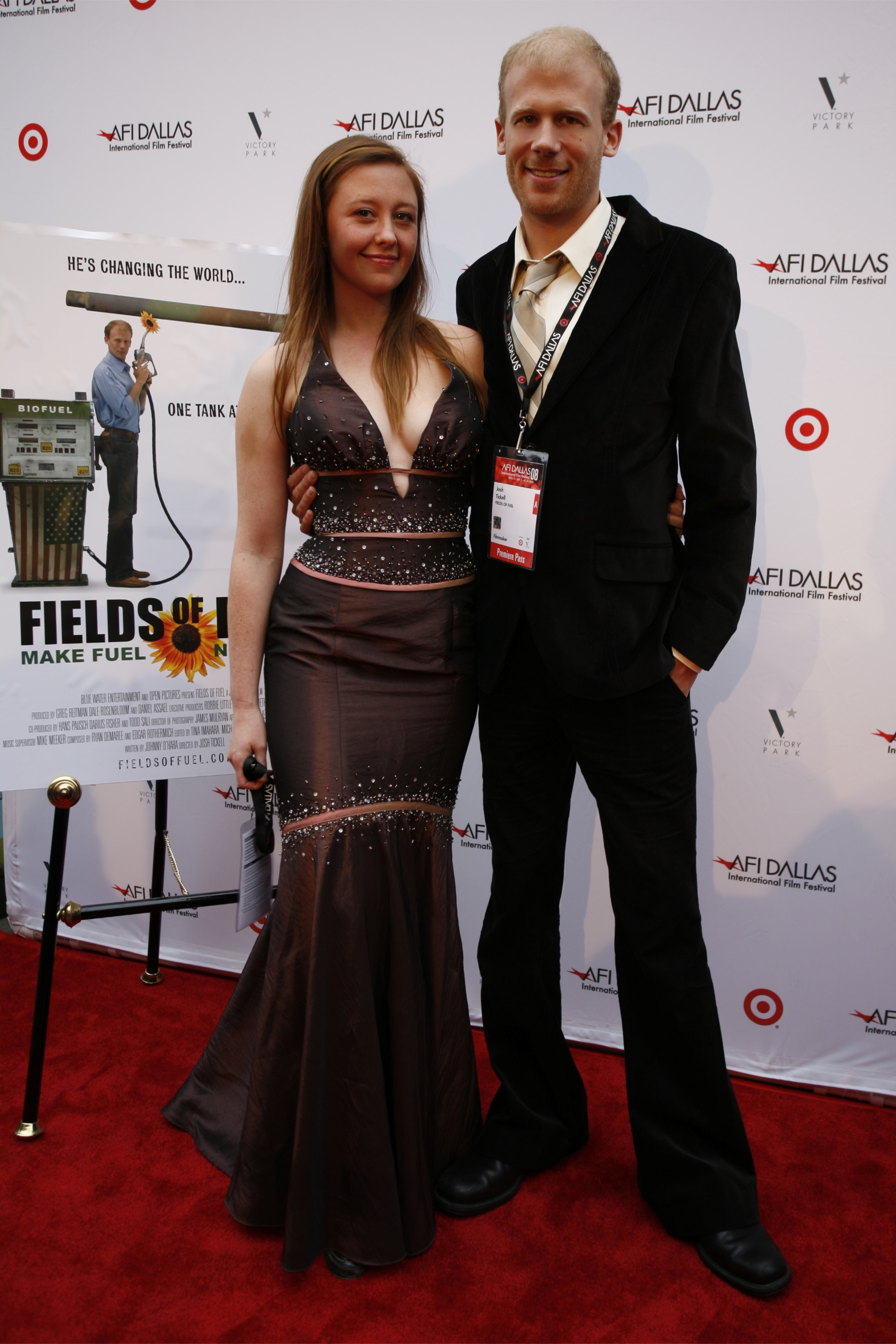
Josh and wife Rebecca Harrell Tickell at AFI Dallas Film Festival, March 2010

=== The Veggie Van Voyage ===
Tickell returned to the US, bought an old diesel-powered Winnebago van that he painted with sunflowers and called the "Veggie Van". He built a small biodiesel processor that he named "The Green Grease Machine" and then set off on a 25,000 mile, two-year tour of the US powered by the biodiesel he made from used grease collected from fast food restaurants along the way. This journey, which eventually became known as The Veggie Van Voyage, attracted the attention of numerous media outlets, serving to promote the publicity of biodiesel as a viable alternative fuel.

=== Books ===
After the Veggie Van tour, Tickell co-wrote his first book, From the Fryer to the Fuel Tank – The Complete Guide to Using Vegetable Oil as an Alternative Fuel.

His second book, Biodiesel America: How to Free America From Oil and Make Money with Alternative Fuel, examines the status quo of the oil industry, the automakers and the government and offers an alternative energy roadmap to wean the US off fossil fuels.

== Filmography ==
- The Big Fix (with Rebecca Harrell Tickell)
- Pump
- Kiss the Ground (with Rebecca Harrell Tickell)
- The Revolution Generation (with Rebecca Harrell Tickell) (2022)
- On Sacred Ground (with Rebecca Harrell Tickell) (2023) about the 2016 Dakota Access Pipeline construction and associated protests on the Standing Rock Indian Reservation.

In 2014, Harrell Tickell directed and produced the documentary film Pump, which is funded by the Fuel Freedom Foundation, whose aim is to reduce American dependence on imported oil through replacing it with US-produced methanol from fossil gas, compressed natural gas (obtained by fracking) and biofuels. These solutions are promoted in Pump, which includes an interview with John Hofmeister, Advisory Board member of the Fuel Freedom Foundation and former President of Shell Oil Co. The film has The Los Angeles Times reviewed the film as "well reasoned and compelling". The film has also been criticised for promoting fossil fuel production such as fracking and methanol from fossil gas, as well as biofuels, which are controversial due to their competition for agricultural land with food production and high emissions. For instance, maize ethanol is estimated to have a higher emissions impact than gasoline and diesel, once carbon opportunity costs are factored in, and substantially higher emissions than solar-powered electric vehicles.

In 2020, Tickell and his wife Rebecca Harrell Tickell co-directed documentary Kiss the Ground, which is narrated by Woody Harrelson, and advocates for restoring soils through regenerative farming as a solution to climate change and soil degradation. The film has received criticism for its uncritical presentation of the ideas of Allan Savory, a controversial figure who has claimed that the carbon sequestration potential of holistic livestock grazing is immune from empirical scientific study. A Food and Climate Research Network meta-study found that Savory's claims that holistic grazing by livestock can reverse climate change were "unrealistic" and very different from those issued by peer-reviewed studies. Kiss the Ground has also been criticised for its selective reference to Project Drawdown, a respected ranking of solutions with the most potential to combat climate change - the film points out that Project Drawdown states that 13.72 - 20.92 Gigatons CO2eq can be sequestered in soils between 2020 and 2050 due to “Managed Grazing” (0.46-0.70 Gigatons CO2eq per year), but omits to mention that this would only be enough to offset of 7-11% of ruminant livestock's total estimated emissions of 6.4 gigatons CO2eq per year, and that Project Drawdown ranks a reduction in livestock numbers due to "Plant-rich diets" as having the 2nd highest potential of all solutions, with potential to reduce emissions by 78.33 - 103.11 Gigatons CO2eq between 2020 and 2050 (2.61-3.44 Gigatons CO2eq per year).

== Clean energy advocacy ==
In September 2009, Tickell's documentary on alternative clean energy, Fuel, was rolled out into 150 cities. In 2012, Tickell's advocacy for clean energy led him to join the advisory board of Grow Energy, a startup focused on developing algae as a viable energy resource.

== Education ==
Tickell holds an undergraduate degree in Sustainable Living from New College of Florida.

After the publication of his first book, Tickell enrolled in Florida State University's School of Motion Picture Television and Recording Arts where he earned his MFA in film.

== See also ==
- Algal fuel
- V2G
