= Woody Harrelson =

American actor (born 1961)

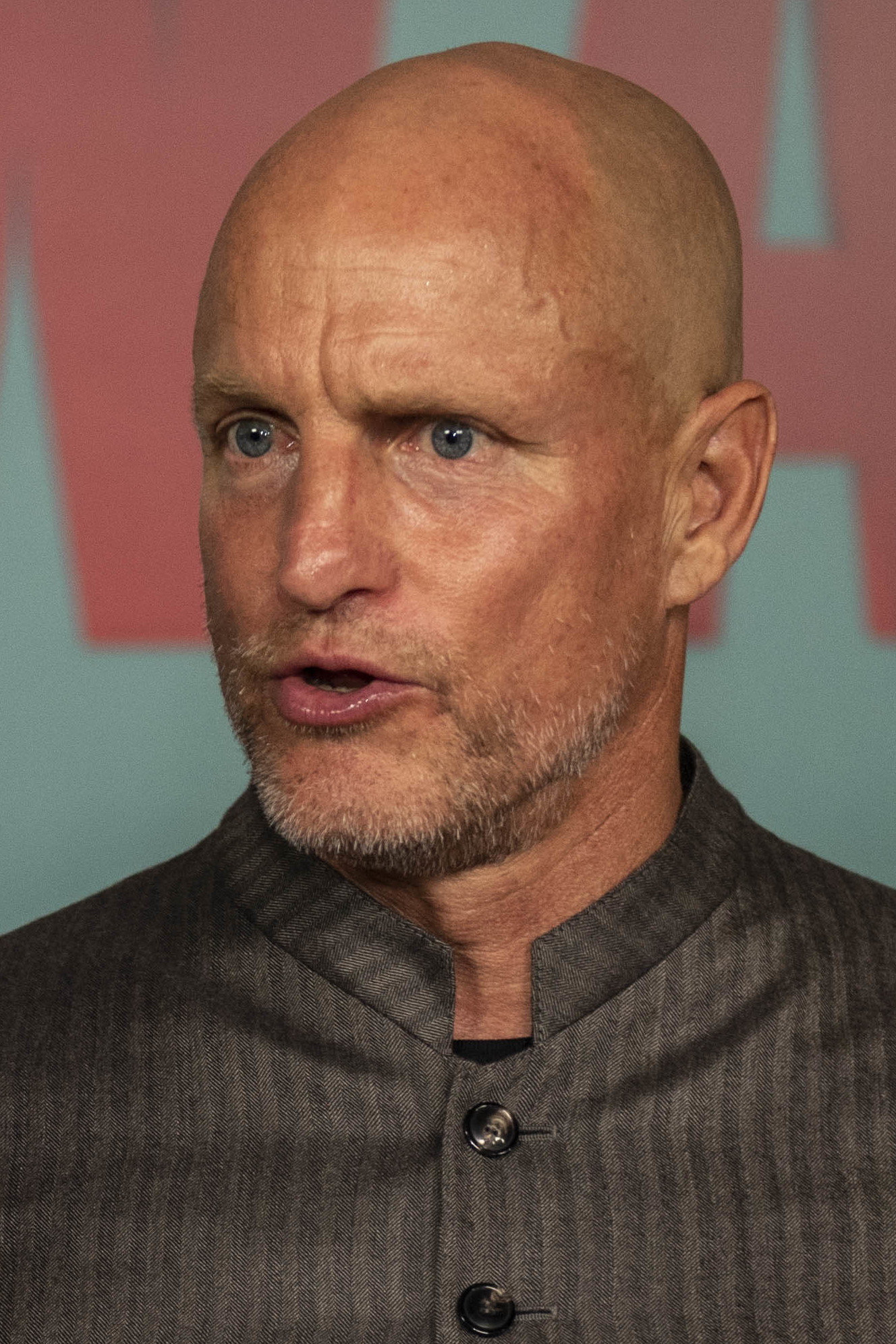
- Harrelson in 2019
- Born: Woodrow Tracy Harrelson; July 23, 1961 (age 65); Midland, Texas, U.S.
- Education: Hanover College
- Occupation: Actor
- Years active: 1978–present
- Works: Filmography
- Spouses: Nancy Simon (m. 1985; div. 1986); Laura Louie (m. 2008)
- Children: 3
- Parents: Charles Harrelson (father); Diane Lou Oswald (mother)
- Awards: Full list

Woodrow Tracy Harrelson (born July 23, 1961) is an American actor. He first became known for his role as charmingly naive bartender Woody Boyd on the NBC sitcom Cheers (1985–1993), for which he won a Primetime Emmy Award for Outstanding Supporting Actor in a Comedy Series from five nominations. Harrelson has received three Academy Award nominations: Best Actor for The People vs. Larry Flynt (1996), and Best Supporting Actor for The Messenger (2009) and Three Billboards Outside Ebbing, Missouri (2017).

Other notable films include White Men Can't Jump (1992), Natural Born Killers (1994), The Thin Red Line (1998), No Country for Old Men (2007), Seven Pounds (2008), Zombieland (2009), 2012 (2009), Seven Psychopaths (2012), The Edge of Seventeen (2016), War for the Planet of the Apes (2017), Venom: Let There Be Carnage (2021), Triangle of Sadness (2022), and Suncoast (2024). He also played Haymitch Abernathy in The Hunger Games film series (2012–2015; 2026), Chase McKinney / Merritt McKinney in the Now You See Me film series (2013–), and Tobias Beckett in Solo: A Star Wars Story (2018).

Harrelson received further Primetime Emmy Award nominations for his portrayal of Steve Schmidt in the HBO film Game Change (2012) and detective Marty Hart in the HBO crime anthology series True Detective (2014). He also portrayed E. Howard Hunt in the HBO political limited series White House Plumbers (2023) and a fictionalized version of himself in the Apple TV comedy series Brothers (2026).

== Early life and education ==
Woodrow Tracy Harrelson was born on July 23, 1961, in Midland, Texas, to secretary Diane Lou and convicted contract killer Charles Voyde Harrelson. He was raised in a Presbyterian household alongside his two brothers, Jordan and Brett, the latter of whom also became an actor. Their father received a life sentence for the 1979 killing of federal judge John H. Wood Jr. Harrelson has stated he had little contact with his father during childhood. Charles died in the United States Penitentiary, Administrative Maximum Facility on March 15, 2007.

Harrelson's family was poor and relied on his mother's wages. He attended The Briarwood School in Houston, Texas. In 1973, he moved to his mother's native city of Lebanon, Ohio, where he attended Lebanon High School, from which he graduated in 1979.

Harrelson attended Hanover College in Hanover, Indiana, where he studied theater and English. While there, he was a member of the Sigma Chi fraternity and became friends with future vice president Mike Pence. He graduated in 1983.

== Career ==
=== 1985–1993: Cheers and early film roles ===
Harrelson is widely known for his work on the NBC sitcom Cheers. He played bartender Woody Boyd, joining the cast in 1985 in season four, spending the final eight seasons (1985–1993) on the show. For this role, Harrelson was nominated for five Emmy Awards, winning once in 1989.

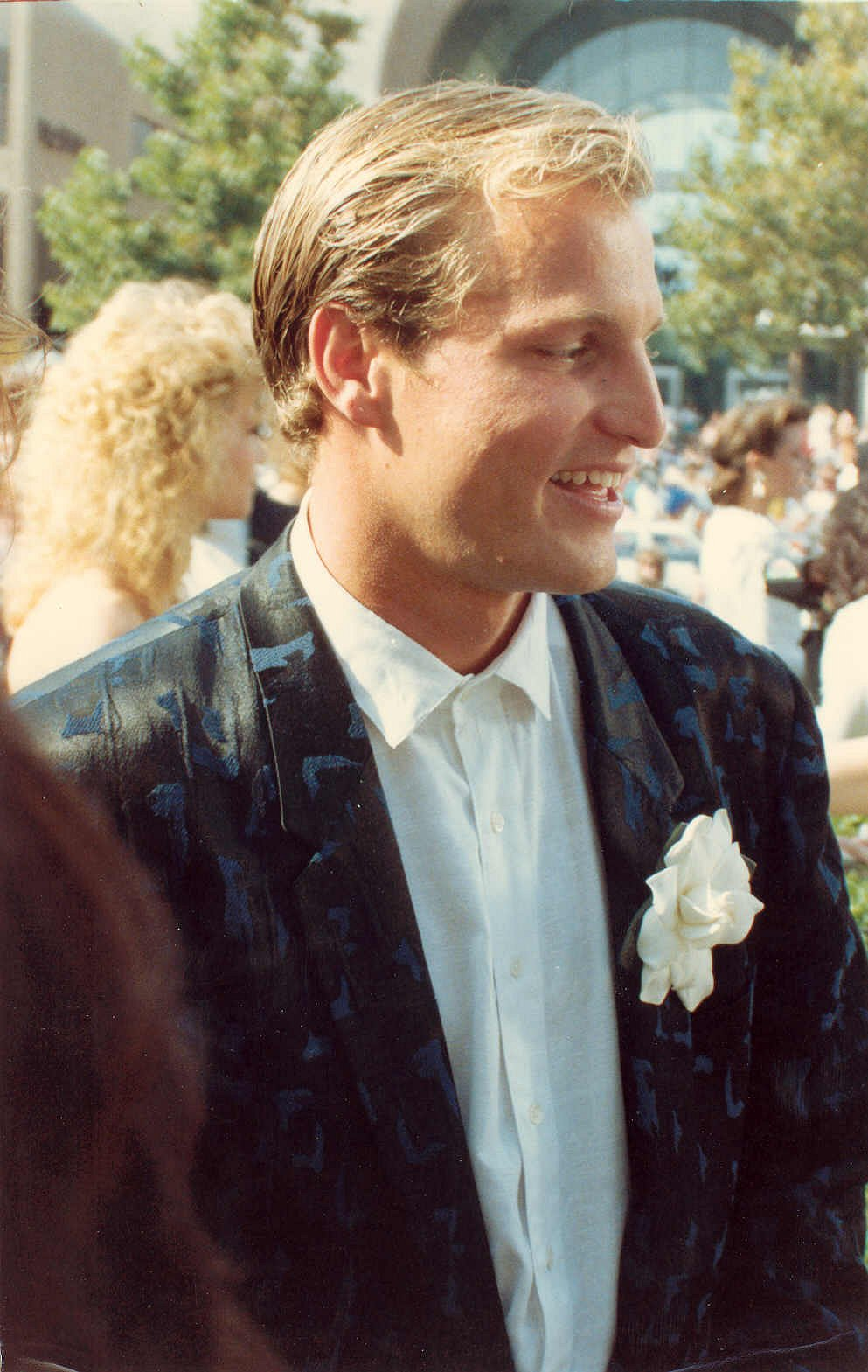
Harrelson at the 1988 Emmy Awards

While still working on Cheers, Harrelson began his film career. His first movie was Wildcats, a 1986 football comedy with Goldie Hawn. He followed his performance in Wildcats with the 1990 romantic comedy Cool Blue, alongside Hank Azaria. He reunited with Wesley Snipes (who also had debuted in Wildcats) in the box-office hit White Men Can't Jump (1992) and the action movie Money Train (1995). In 1993, Harrelson starred opposite Robert Redford and Demi Moore in the drama Indecent Proposal, which was a box office success, earning a worldwide total of over $265,000,000. He then played Mickey Knox in Oliver Stone's Natural Born Killers and Dr. Michael Raynolds in the Michael Cimino film The Sunchaser.

=== 1994–2011: Established actor ===
In 2003, he co-starred as Galaxia/Gary in the comedy film Anger Management. He appeared in the action film After the Sunset and the Spike Lee film She Hate Me. In 2005, Harrelson was in The Big White and North Country. Also in 2005 he appeared as Kelly Ryan, husband of a contest-obsessed woman in the film The Prize Winner of Defiance, Ohio. In the winter of 2005–2006 Harrelson returned to London's West End, starring in Tennessee Williams' Night of the Iguana at the Lyric Theater. Harrelson directed Bullet for Adolf (a play he wrote with Frankie Hyman) at the esteemed Hart House Theatre in Toronto, Ontario, which ran from April 21 to May 7, 2011. Bullet for Adolf opened Off-Broadway (New World Stages) with previews beginning July 19, 2012, and closed on September 30, 2012, canceling its announced extension through October 21. The play was panned by New York critics. Harrelson made two films in 2006, the animated film version of Free Jimmy and also A Scanner Darkly the latter being written and directed by Richard Linklater.

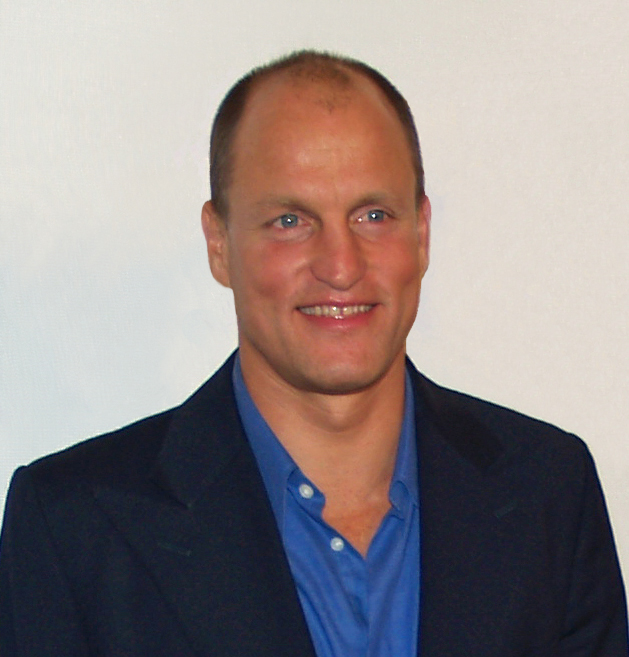
Harrelson in April 2007

In June 6, 2010, Harrelson took part playing in Soccer Aid 2010 for UNICEF UK at Old Trafford in Manchester. The match was broadcast live on UK's ITV television. After being brought on as a substitute for Gordon Ramsay, Harrelson took the final penalty in the penalty shootout, following a 2–2 draw after 91.2 minutes. Despite being initially unaware of exactly from where his kick had to be taken, Harrelson scored to win the game for "The Rest of the World" team, beating England for the first time since the tournament began. When later interviewed, he claimed that he "didn't even remember the moment of scoring." In 2011, he starred as Tommy in the movie Friends with Benefits. Harrelson narrated the 2011 film ETHOS, which explores the idea of a self-destructing modern society, governed by unequal power and failed democratic ideals. Harrelson also took part in Soccer Aid 2012 on May 27, 2012. The match ended 3–1 in favor of England.

=== 2012–present: Career expansion and acclaim ===
He played Haymitch Abernathy in 2012's The Hunger Games, and reprised the role in all three subsequent films in the series which ended in 2015. In 2012, he had a leading role in the acclaimed HBO television film Game Change as republican strategist Steve Schmidt working for the 2008 Presidential campaign for John McCain and Sarah Palin. Harrelson acted alongside Julianne Moore, Sarah Paulson, and Ed Harris. The film was directed by Jay Roach and written by Danny Strong. For his performance he was nominated for numerous accolades including the Primetime Emmy Award for Outstanding Lead Actor in a Limited or Anthology Series or Movie, the Golden Globe Award for Best Actor – Miniseries or Television Film, and the Screen Actors Guild Award for Outstanding Performance by a Male Actor in a Miniseries or Television Movie. On February 3, 2012, he participated in an "Ask Me Anything" session on the website Reddit. The AMA turned into a PR disaster when Harrelson failed to make meaningful responses to any questions and soon specifically refused to respond to anything not directly related to the then-upcoming worldwide release of the crime drama Rampart (2011), in which he starred and received a nomination for the Independent Spirit Award for Best Male Lead.

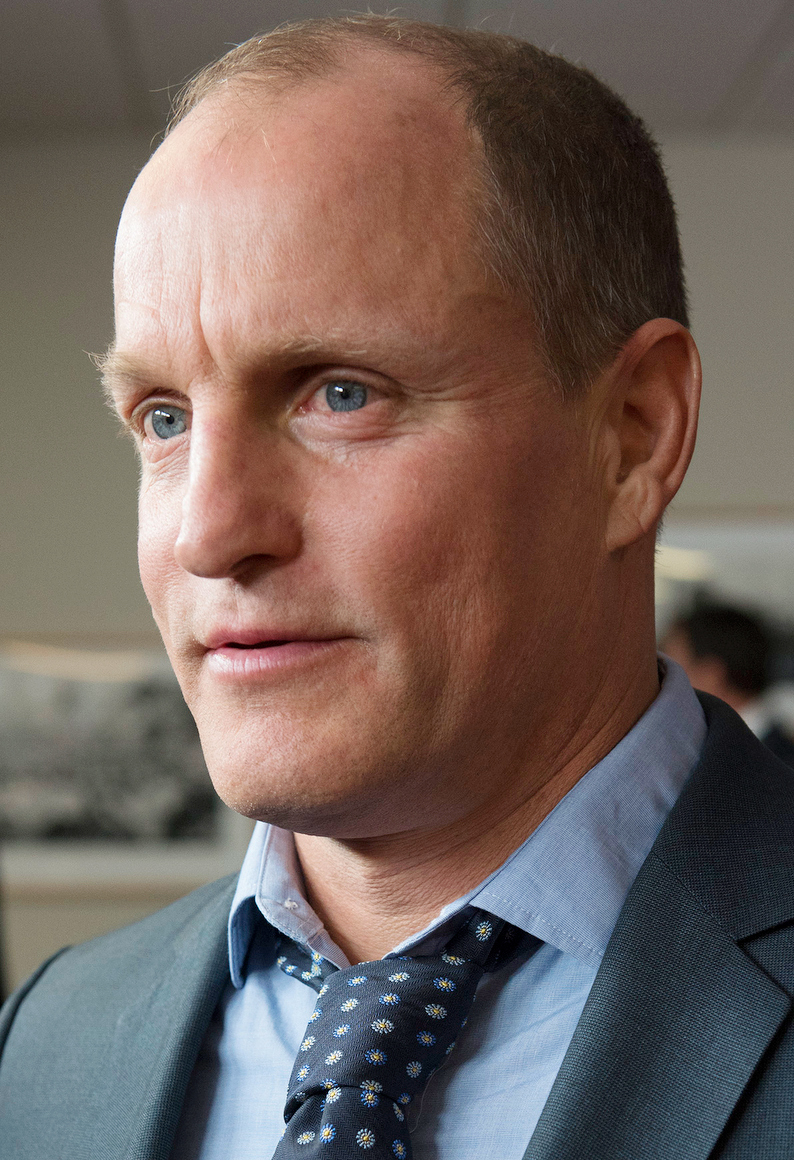
Harrelson at the Lyndon Baines Johnson Library and Museum in 2016

Harrelson returned to television in 2014, starring along with Matthew McConaughey in the first season of the HBO crime series True Detective, where he played Marty Hart, a Louisiana cop investigating murders that took place over a timespan of 17 years. He and McConaughey received nominations for the Primetime Emmy Award for Outstanding Lead Actor in a Drama Series losing to Bryan Cranston for the final season of Breaking Bad. In 2015, Woody Harrelson and daughter Zoe starred in a 7-minute short film for U2's 'Song for Someone.' In 2016, Harrelson announced that he would direct, write, produce, and star in a film, Lost in London, which was shot as a single take and premiered live on January 19, 2017. Harrelson played police chief Bill Willoughby in the black comedy crime film Three Billboards Outside Ebbing, Missouri, released in 2017, for which he received nominations for an Academy Award for Best Supporting Actor and a Screen Actors Guild Award for Outstanding Performance by a Male Actor in a Supporting Role. In 2017, he played the antagonist The Colonel in the science fiction film War for the Planet of the Apes. Also that year, he starred in comedic drama film The Glass Castle, an adaptation of Jeannette Walls's memoir.

In 2018, Harrelson played Tobias Beckett, a criminal and Han Solo's mentor in Lucasfilm's Solo: A Star Wars Story. In 2018, Harrelson appeared in a cameo at the end of the film Venom, portraying Cletus Kasady, and he reprised the role as the main antagonist, also voicing Carnage in the 2021 sequel Venom: Let There Be Carnage. In 2019, he starred with Kevin Costner in The Highwaymen. In November 2019, he starred in Roland Emmerich's blockbuster movie Midway, playing Admiral Chester Nimitz. The same year he reprised his role of Tallahassee in Zombieland 2: Double Tap (2019). Starting in 2019, Harrelson made numerous appearances portraying Joe Biden on Saturday Night Live, before being replaced by Jim Carrey.

In March 2021, he is set to portray Felix Kersten in The Man with the Miraculous Hands, the feature film adaptation of Joseph Kessel's 1960 novel of the same title. Harrelson starred in the HBO political limited series White House Plumbers (2023) where he portrayed intelligence officer E. Howard Hunt. The series is focused on the Watergate scandal and investigation. Harrelson also executive produced the series. Also in 2023, he starred in Champions, as a disgraced coach coerced to head up a Special Olympics basketball team, featuring many actors with special needs.

== Personal life ==
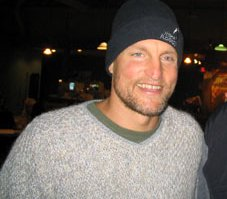
Harrelson in 2004

In 1985, Harrelson married Nancy Simon (daughter of playwright Neil Simon) in Tijuana, Mexico. The union was not intended to be serious, and the two had planned to divorce the following day, but the storefront marriage/divorce parlor was closed when they returned to it and they remained married for another ten months.

In 2008, he married Laura Louie, a co-founder of the organic food delivery service Yoganics. They met in 1987 when she worked as his personal assistant. They reside in Maui, Hawaii, and have three daughters (born in 1993, 1996, and 2006).

Harrelson was awarded an honorary Doctor of Humane Letters (DHL) from Hanover College in 2014.

Harrelson is a fan of chess. In November 2018, he attended the first game of the World Chess Championship in London, played between Norwegian champion Magnus Carlsen and American contender Fabiano Caruana. He made the ceremonial first move for the game. He had also played the ceremonial first move for the previous World Chess Championship, held in New York City in 2016.

In 1999 in Prague, Woody Harrelson, playing White, employed the Parham Attack, named after Bernard Parham, to draw World Chess Champion Garry Kasparov. However, Harrelson was aided by several chess Grandmasters who were in Prague to spectate the chess match between GM Alexei Shirov and GM Judit Polgár.

In 2020, Harrelson was seen practicing Brazilian jiu-jitsu while filming, having received the first stripe on his white belt.

Harrelson is a fan of the Cincinnati Bengals.

In 2023, Harrelson's longtime friend and True Detective co-star/co-executive producer Matthew McConaughey stated that he and Harrelson could potentially be half-brothers. McConaughey's mother claimed to have been intimate with Harrelson's father, Charles Harrelson, around the time of McConaughey's conception.

=== Lifestyle and views ===
Harrelson follows a raw vegan diet. He does not eat meat, dairy, sugar or flour. In Zombieland, in which he plays a character with an affinity for Twinkies, the Twinkies were replaced with vegan faux-Twinkies made from cornmeal. He appeared on a postage stamp (as a PhotoStamp) in 2011 as one of PETA's 20 famous vegetarians, and he was named PETA's Sexiest Vegetarian in 2012 (along with Jessica Chastain).

Harrelson was a religious Presbyterian as a child, and studied theology during college. Harrelson told Playboy in October 2009, "I was getting into theology and studying the roots of the Bible, but then I started to discover the man-made nature of it. I started seeing things that made me ask, 'Is God really speaking through this instrument?' My eyes opened to the reality of the Bible being just a document to control people." However, he later described himself as having "a strong spiritual life" and said he believed in God.

In April 2020, Harrelson made a post on Instagram promoting the conspiracy theory that claims a link between 5G networks and COVID-19, which was later deleted. In May 2022, Harrelson said he "doesn't believe in the germ theory" and found the use of face masks as a preventative measure against COVID-19 to be "absurd", adding, "I'm sick of like, you're wearing a mask, and you think it contains your breath—but if it did you'd die, you'd be breathing in your own carbon monoxide [sic]."

=== Legal issues ===
On June 1, 1996, Harrelson was arrested in Lee County, Kentucky, after symbolically planting four hemp seeds to challenge the state law that did not distinguish between industrial hemp and marijuana. Harrelson had arrived in the county with his attorney, former Kentucky governor Louie B. Nunn, an agent and a camera crew from CNN. While at a local hotel, Harrelson phoned the county sheriff, Junior Kilburn, to advise him of his intentions. Kilburn and Deputy Sheriff Danny Towsend arrived at the location where Harrelson informed them he would be. With the cameras rolling, Harrelson planted the hemp seeds into the ground. Once planted, Kilburn placed Harrelson under arrest for cultivating marijuana and booked him into the county jail. He was released on $200 bail the same day. He later signed autographs and posed for photos with deputies. He was acquitted of those charges with the help of Nunn after just 25 minutes. The events were featured in the 2010 Michael P. Henning documentary film Hempsters: Plant the Seed.

In 2002, Harrelson was arrested in London after an incident in a taxi that ended in a police chase. Harrelson was taken to a London police station and later released on bail. The case was later dismissed after Harrelson paid the taxi driver involved in the incident £550 ($844). This became the inspiration for his 2017 live-streamed film Lost in London.

In 2008, TMZ photographer Josh Levine filed a lawsuit against Harrelson for an alleged attack outside a Hollywood nightclub in 2006. A video of the incident appeared to show Harrelson grabbing a camera and clashing with the photographer. Los Angeles prosecutors declined to press charges against the actor, but Levine filed a suit that summer asking for $2.5 million in damages. The case was dismissed in April 2010.

== Other ventures ==
=== Business ===
On May 13, 2022, Harrelson opened The Woods WeHo—a cannabis dispensary off Santa Monica Boulevard in Los Angeles, California.

In September 2023, Harrelson announced the launch of his co-founded The Holistic Spirits Company, a plant-based spirits brand based in Utah.

=== Activism ===
Harrelson is an enthusiast and supporter of the legalization of marijuana and hemp. He was a guest on Ziggy Marley's track "Wild and Free", a song advocating the growing of cannabis. Since 2003, Harrelson has served as a member on NORML's advisory board.

Harrelson has attended environmental events such as the PICNIC'07 festival that was held in Amsterdam in September 2007. PICNIC describes its annual festival as "three intensive days [when] we mix creativity, science, technology, media, and business to explore new solutions in the spirit of co-creation". He once scaled the Golden Gate Bridge with members of North Coast Earth First! group to unfurl a banner that read, "Hurwitz, aren't ancient redwoods more precious than gold?" in protest of Maxxam Inc. CEO Charles Hurwitz, who once stated, "He who has the gold, makes the rules."

Harrelson once traveled to the west coast in the U.S. on a bike and a domino caravan with a hemp oil-fueled biodiesel bus with the Spitfire Agency (the subject of the independent documentary Go Further) and narrated the 1999 documentary Grass. He briefly owned an oxygen bar in West Hollywood called "O2".

Harrelson has spoken publicly against the 2003 invasion of Iraq as well as previously protesting against the First Gulf War, both at UCLA as well as during a college concert tour in Iowa and Nebraska in 1991 under the auspices of "Woody Harrelson Educational Tours". In October 2009, he was given an honorary degree by York University for his contributions in the fields of environmental education, sustainability, and activism.

In June 2010, Harrelson took part in Soccer Aid at Old Trafford in Manchester to raise money for UNICEF. Harrelson played the last 15 minutes and scored the winning goal in the penalty shootout following a 2–2 draw during normal time. He played in the UNICEF game 2012, playing the last 10 minutes of the game for the Rest of the World team, losing 3–1 to England.

=== Politics ===
Harrelson describes himself as an anarchist. In a conversation with Howard Zinn, Harrelson stated that he considers Zinn to be a personal hero of his. In 2002, Harrelson wrote an article in the British newspaper The Guardian condemning President George W. Bush's preparation for a US invasion of Iraq as a "racist and imperialist war". He also stated that he was against the U.S.'s previous war in Iraq and President Bill Clinton's sanctions against Iraq. In 2013, Harrelson condemned President Barack Obama for failing to withdraw U.S. troops from Afghanistan, negatively comparing him to Richard Nixon.

In 2017, Harrelson strongly criticized President Donald Trump in an interview with the Associated Press, where he is quoted stating "We have a guy running this country who has unearthed a lot of bigotry and a lot of racism, and it seems to be more virulent than ever. So, yeah, it's strange how we just, it seems like we're going backward".

In 2023, he appeared to endorse Robert F. Kennedy Jr. In May 2024, Kennedy's campaign released a short documentary on the life and career of the politician, narrated by Harrelson.

== Filmography and awards ==
With a career portfolio of filmography and other performances spanning a variety of genres, Harrelson is known for his roles both in front of and behind the camera on several projects. His acting credits have earned him global recognition, having garnered him nominations for seven Primetime Emmy Awards, three Academy Awards, a BAFTA Award, four Golden Globe Awards, and seven Screen Actors Guild Awards. His Oscar nominations include a Best Actor nod for his role as Larry Flynt in the 1996 biographical drama The People vs. Larry Flynt, and Best Supporting Actor for his portrayals of a Gulf War veteran and a police chief in 2009's The Messenger and 2017's Three Billboards Outside Ebbing, Missouri, respectively.

On television, his breakthrough role as bartender Woody Boyd earned him five Emmy nominations in the category of Outstanding Supporting Actor in a Comedy Series, with one win. Harrelson later returned to the small screen with roles in the comedy series Frasier and the 2012 television film Game Change, for which he received two more Emmy nominations: for Outstanding Guest Actor in a Comedy Series and Outstanding Lead Actor in a Miniseries or Movie, respectively.

Aside from his numerous successes in the industry, other credits include North Country (2005), No Country for Old Men (2007), 2012, Zombieland (both 2009), Now You See Me (2013) and its 2016 sequel, The Hunger Games film series (2012–2015), The Edge of Seventeen, LBJ (both 2016), The Glass Castle (2017) and Kate (2021), Harrelson has also starred in critically panned films, with his role in 1993's Indecent Proposal winning him the Golden Raspberry Award for Worst Supporting Actor in 1994.

Harrelson was nominated for the 2023 Offie for Best Lead Performer - Ulster American.

== See also ==
- List of vegans
- List of celebrities who own cannabis businesses
