= Bart Simpson (filmmaker) =

Canadian film director

Simpson in 2026

Bart Simpson (born c. 1970) is a Canadian producer and director of documentary and fiction films. He is most noted as a producer of the 2003 feature documentary The Corporation, which was the winner of the Genie Award for Best Feature Length Documentary at the 25th Genie Awards in 2005, and the Audience Award for World Cinema-Documentary at the 2004 Sundance Film Festival.

Born in Victoria, British Columbia, and raised in the suburb of Esquimalt, he is a graduate of Simon Fraser University. His early artistic projects included the short film Vampire's Guide to Sweden, and the fringe festival musical Phat Tank.

Following the success of The Corporation, Simpson acted as Canadian producer on Moebius Redux featuring illustrator Jean Giraud, and acted in the same capacity for the feature documentary Bananas!* with Swedish director Fredrik Gertten. The latter film was hit with a lawsuit from Dole Food Company in summer 2009. Subsequently, Gertten directed the film Big Boys Gone Bananas!*, which featured the Bananas!* filmmaking team including Simpson, and told the story of their fight against Dole as a First Amendment case.

In 2017, Simpson premiered his film Brasília: Life After Design. at Sheffield Doc/Fest, with the US Premiere in Competition at the Margaret Mead Film Festival. He subsequently entered production on The Mad World of Harvey Kurtzman, which had its World Premiere as the only documentary in the Sean Connery Competition at the 2026 Edinburgh International Film Festival., and its International Premiere in Competition at the 2026 edition of DOC NYC.

Simpson is a past national chairperson of the Documentary Organization of Canada.
