= Dead Donkeys Fear No Hyenas =

2017 Swedish-Ethiopian documentary film

- Directed by: Joakim Demmer
- Written by: Joakim Demmer
- Produced by: Margarete Jangård; Heino Deckert; John Webster
- Starring: Alexander Karim; Mohammed Alamoudi; Ivan Holmes; Argaw Ashine
- Cinematography: Joakim Demmer; Ute Freund; Zeb Davidsson; Mark Barrs; Peter Bolte
- Edited by: Stefan Sundlöf; Frank Brummundt
- Music by: Matthias Trippner
- Production companies: WG Film; Ma.Ja.De Filmproduktion; J.W. Documentaries Oy
- Distributed by: Neue Visionen Filmverleih; Yleisradio (YLE)
- Release date: 28 April 2017; (USA)
- Running time: 83 minutes
- Countries: Sweden; Germany; Finland; Netherlands
- Languages: Amharic; English

Dead Donkeys Fear No Hyenas, is a 2017 Swedish-Ethiopian documentary thriller film directed by Joakim Demmer and co-produced by Margarete Jangård for WG Film, Heino Deckert for ma.ja.de, and John Webster for JW Documentaries. The film revolves around farmland, the new green gold in Ethiopia, where foreign investors take control of millions of hectares of allegedly unused land, spurring massive forced evictions of local populations and violent repression of protest and resistance.

The film was shot in and around Addis Ababa, Bale Province and Gambela in Ethiopia; New York City, Austin Texas and Washington in the USA and the Gorom refugee camp in South Sudan. The film made its World Premiere at CPH:DOX 2017 in the United States. The film received mixed reviews from critics and made official selection at many film festivals. In the Munich International Documentary Festival (DOK.fest) 2017, the film was nominated for the Viktor Award for DOK.horizons and then for Environmental Award at the Sheffield International Documentary Festival.

== Cast ==
- Alexander Karim – Narrator (voice)
- Mohammed Alamoudi – agriculture investor
- Ivan Holmes – farmer and agriculture investor
- Argaw Ashine – Ethiopian reporter
- Abraham D. – native farmer in Gambela Region
- Omot Agwa Okwoy – Gambela National Park official
- Paul McMahon – co-founder and Managing Partner of SLM Partners
- Yitagess Ketema – project manager at Saudi Star Agricultural Development
- Owanyia A. – former Ethiopian civil servant
- Stefan G. Koeberle – director of risk management, World Bank
- Mark King – chief officer of environmental and social standards, World Bank
- Olemo A. – Gambella refugee
- David Pred – co-founder of Inclusive Development International
- Jedowang O. – eyewitness of Ethiopian Army attack on unarmed civilians
- Obang Metho – Ethiopian human rights defender
- Okello O. – forcefully evicted farmer
- Ajullut T. – forcefully evicted farmer
- Okwori P. – forcefully evicted farmer
- Otonge O. – forcefully evicted
- Achalla O. – forcefully evicted
- Olera O.
- Bisrat Negash
- Bedilu Abera
- Mian Nasiruddin
