= Susan Scott =

Susan Scott may refer to:

- Susan Holloway Scott, American author, also known as Miranda Jarrett
- Nieves Navarro (born 1938), Spanish-born Italian actress, stage name Susan Scott
- Susan Scott (runner) (born 1977), British middle distance runner
- Susan Beth Scott, American Paralympic swimmer
- Susan G. Scott (born 1949), Canadian artist
- Susan M. Scott, Australian physicist
- Susan Scott (filmmaker) (born 1972), British-South African documentary filmmaker
- Susan Scott (born 1944), author of Fierce Conversations: Achieving Success at Work and in Life One Conversation at a Time

== See also ==
- Sue Scott (disambiguation)
