= WG Film =

Swedish production company

WG Film (former Westman & Gertten AB) is a Swedish production company that produces national and international documentaries. The company is located in Malmö and was founded in 1994 by documentary filmmaker Lars Westman and journalist Fredrik Gertten.

WG Film produces documentaries for broadcast and cinema. The early films of the company were often local stories with global relevance. With time, the films have become more and more international. Most notable films include PUSH (2019) about the global housing crisis, Bikes vs Cars (2015) on cycling and the car industry's control over city planning, Bananas!* (2009) on a conflict between the Dole Food Company and banana plantation workers in Nicaragua as well as its sequel Big Boys Gone Bananas!* (2012) on Dole Food's lawsuit against Gertten, WG Film and the films' producer Margarete Jangård.

The latest film produced by WG Film BREAKING SOCIAL (2023) explores global patterns of corruption and kleptocracy. The social contract theory is a central theme in the film and how this contract has been broken by the ultra rich and the powerful is examined, but also how a new social contract can be made. The film premiered at CPH:DOX in March 2023.

WG Film's movies have been shown at festivals such as Sundance Film Festival, South by Southwest and International Documentary Film Festival Amsterdam.

== Productions ==
- 2023 - Breaking Social
- 2019 - Push
- 2017 - Dead Donkeys Fear No Hyenas
- 2016 - Becoming Zlatan
- 2015 - Bikes vs Cars
- 2013 - Maria and Her Shadow
- 2012 - The Invisible Bicycle Helmet (short)
- 2012 - Big Boys Gone Bananas!*
- 2011 - Love Always, Carolyn
- 2010 - I Bought a Rain Forest
- 2009 - Bananas!*
- 2008 - The Leftovers
- 2007 - Milk Bar
- 2006 - Thin Ice
- 2006 - Belfast Girls
- 2005 - An Ordinary Family
- 2005 - The Socialist, the Architect and the Twisted Tower
- 2003 - Just a Piece of Steel
- 2003 - Love Boat
- 2002 - The Way Back - True Blue 2
- 2002 - Boogie Woogie Daddy
- 2001 - The Poetry General
- 2000 - Travel with Siluette
- 2000 - The Death of a Working Man's Newspaper
- 2000 - The Great Bridge
- 2000 - Walking on Water
- 1998 - True Blue
- 1998 - Samba Football
- 1995 - Malmö - Montevideo, my place in this world

== Awards ==
Push -

- Svenska arkitekters kritikerpris
- Winner Prix Italia Signis Special Award
- Shortlisted European Film Academy Award for Best Documentary
- Politiken Audience Award - CPH:DOX
- Young Jury Reteena Award - Docs Barcelona
- Best Feature Award - San Francisco Green Film Festival
- Special Mention - Life After Oil Film Festival
- Justin Louis Award Best Documentary (Feature) - Freedom Film Fest
- Open Eyes Youth Jury Award - Nuremberg Human Right Film Festival
- Premio del Jurado Global Docs Jury Award - DocsMX

Bikes vs Cars -

- 2015 - UK Green Film Fest's Audience Award Audience Award
- 2015 - Docs Against Gravity Film Festival - Special Mention
- 2015 - Tempo Documentary Award - Honourable Mention
- 2015 - ciwem.org Green Ribbon Political Awards
- 2015 - San Francisco Green Film Festival - Best Feature

Big Boys Gone Bananas -

- 2010 - Sarasota Film Festival - Winner for Best Documentary
- 2012 - One World Film Festival - Winner of Audience Award and The Rudolf Vrba Jury Award
- 2012 - Hotdocs - Top Ten Audience Favourite
- 2012 - Sarasota fest annual Florida ceremony - Best Documentary
- MIFF Awards - Winner of Best Documentary and Best Film

== Co-productions ==
- 2022 - Daughters
- 2019 - Jozi Gold
- 2014 - The Man Who Saved the World
- 2011 - Love Addict
- 2008 - Burma VJ
- 2008 - Final Image
