= Susan Scott (filmmaker) =

South African documentary filmmaker

- Born: 1972 (age 53–54); Zvishavane, Zimbabwe
- Education: Baylor University, Texas
- Occupation: Documentary filmmaker
- Known for: Director and producer of the documentary STROOP - Journey into the Rhino Horn War

Susan Scott is a British-South African documentary filmmaker known for her film Stroop - Journey into the Rhino Horn War (2018). Born in Zimbabwe, her British family later emigrated to South Africa where she went to high school. Receiving an athletic scholarship to study in the United States, she lived there for ten years before returning to Africa. Scott films all over the world on conservation themed films. She has been named an Unsung Conservation Hero by Africa Geographic.

== Early life and education ==
Scott was born in 1972, in Zvishavane (then Shabani) in Zimbabwe (then Rhodesia), the daughter of Douglas James Scott and Iona Scott (née MacKenzie). She has a younger brother and both are British citizens due to their Scottish mother and father of Scottish descent.

Scott has said her time in nature in the bushveld in Zimbabwe, where her parents were stationed as well as the countryside at her mother's family home on the Isle of Skye in Scotland had an impact on her. This continued when her parents emigrated to South Africa when she was a teenager. She spent considerable time in the Kruger National Park and the park would later form a substantial part of the storyline in her film STROOP – Journey into the Rhino Horn War. Scott excelled at athletics in primary school (Mashaba Primary School in Mashava) where she ran track and field, played hockey, netball and tennis, as well as represented her province for swimming in Zimbabwe. In high school (West Ridge High School in Roodepoort, South Africa) she made the athletics (track & field) team every year and played in the squash, tennis and hockey first teams. She went on to represent her province at SA Hockey Schools Week in 1988 and 1989, making the SA Schools B-section team in her senior year. Scott's father pushed for her to study overseas, and she received an athletic scholarship to Baylor University in Texas, United States where she captained the Golf Team, lettering all four years at Baylor. She was honoured with the Mortar Board's Outstanding Woman in her Senior Year as well as making the Dean's List and the SWC (South West Conference) Academic Team. She graduated in 1995 with a bachelor's degree, film communication.

== Career ==
Scott was mentored in editing by Tony Blacks, a member of the American Cinema Editors (A.C.E.), in Washington, DC. She went on to work for his company as an intern and at the end of her internship, she was hired by his company as a film editor, where she went on to edit documentaries for Animal Planet, Discovery, National Geographic (American TV channel), NBC and PBS. Scott returned to Africa to edit on films for wildlife filmmakers over the next two decades. She worked with wildlife cinematographers Peter Lamberti, Richard Matthews (filmmaker) and Dereck Joubert before setting out to make her own films. Aside from documentary filmmaking, Scott is a photographer. In 2018 her photograph Late-Night Feed of two black rhino orphans being fed a bottle by an orphan caregiver was highly commended by the Wildlife Photographer of the Year Awards The image was also named in the Top 100 Wildlife Images of the Year. She credits her father, who was a keen photographer as well as her maternal grandmother, the British artist J.L. MacKenzie, for her eye in the visual arts.

=== Haas and Brandt's Thesis and first job ===
While at Baylor, Scott focused on cinematography and also became a test subject in Chicago Fire (TV series) co-creators Derek Haas and Michael Brandt's Master's Thesis on digital nonlinear editing and the effects of the tool on the final film product. The research work from the college students was put in a blind numbering system and graded by a team of A.C.E. editors to rationalize the data for Haas and Brandt's thesis. One of the editors, Tony Black, A.C.E., asked Dr Michael Korpi, Baylor professor overseeing the study, if he could hire the numbered student, saying "If possible, I'd sure like to know who this is. They understand editing." "It is the clearest indication I've ever had about the excellence of any student's work," dr. Korpi said. Scott has credited Dr Korpi for persuading her to change from cinematography to editing, and she went on to work for Black in Washington DC for six years.

=== The Last Lions ===
Scott edited on and off for three years on the feature documentary film, The Last Lions for National Geographic Explorers in Residence filmmakers, Dereck and Beverly Joubert. The film won awards for its editing, most notably at the Jackson Hole Wildlife Film Festival (now called Jackson Wild) in 2011 and at the International Wildlife Film Festival, IWFF both in the USA.

=== STROOP – journey into the rhino horn war ===
Scott got the idea to make STROOP - Journey into the Rhino Horn War when she was filming with her producing partner, the television presenter Bonné de Bod on a story for 50/50 (South African TV program) in South Africa. The pair filmed throughout South Africa, also in Kenya and going undercover into four countries in South East Asia to reveal the extent of wildlife crime in rhino horn trafficking. STROOP was Scott's directorial debut and won 30 awards at over 40 film festivals around the globe, winning the duo acclaim from industry peers and the press for the film's groundbreaking work.

=== Kingdoms of Fire, Ice and Fairy Tales ===
Scott's second film is an adventure-documentary, Kingdoms of Fire, Ice & Fairy Tales with producing partner Bonné de Bod appearing in front of camera from isolated wilderness areas in the world. The duo have said that the goal of this film is to help audiences connect to nature. It world premiered at Jackson Wild in 2020 and went on to win several awards at film festivals before being broadcast on Showmax, kykNET, and M-Net Movie Channels in Africa and ARTE in Europe. It was nominated for a South African Film and Television Award (SAFTA) alongside My Octopus Teacher in 2021.

== Awards ==
Scott has gone on to win over 30 awards for her work as a filmmaker. Her first award came as an editor when she received a SAFTA for her editing of Dolphin Army for National Geographic in 2010 and then another SAFTA win the following year for Warthog Mother, also for National Geographic. Scott was awarded the use of the acronym, S.A.G.E. by the South Africa Guild of Editors in 2010. She has won a Jackson Wild Media Award, considered the OSCARS of wildlife documentary film, four SAFTAs and five SAB EnviroMedia. Scott & her co-producer Bonné de Bod received multiple awards for their film STROOP – journey into the rhino horn war, most notable being the Best Documentary Award at the San Diego International Film Festival in 2018, the Genesis Award in Los Angeles for Best International Documentary in 2019 as well as the Encounters Documentary Film Festival Audience Award also in 2019 and the South African Film and Television Award (SAFTA) in 2020.

== Filmography ==
Partial filmography.

Some of the films Scott was involved in:
Year	Title	Role	Awards
2020	Kingdoms of Fire, Ice & Fairy Tales	Director, writer, editor	Impact DOCS awards for Best Documentary, Cinematography, Script and Title Design;
2018	STROOP – Journey into the Rhino Horn War	Director, writer, editor	The film won 30 awards.
2012	The Last Lions	Editor	SAFTA Award for Best Editor of a Wildlife Programme (sharing it with Candice Odgers)
2008	Dolphin Army	Editor	SAFTA Award for Best Editor in a TV Wildlife Programme
2000	Treasures of the Royal Captain	Co-editor	
