= San Francisco Green Film Festival =

American environmental film festival from 2011 to 2019

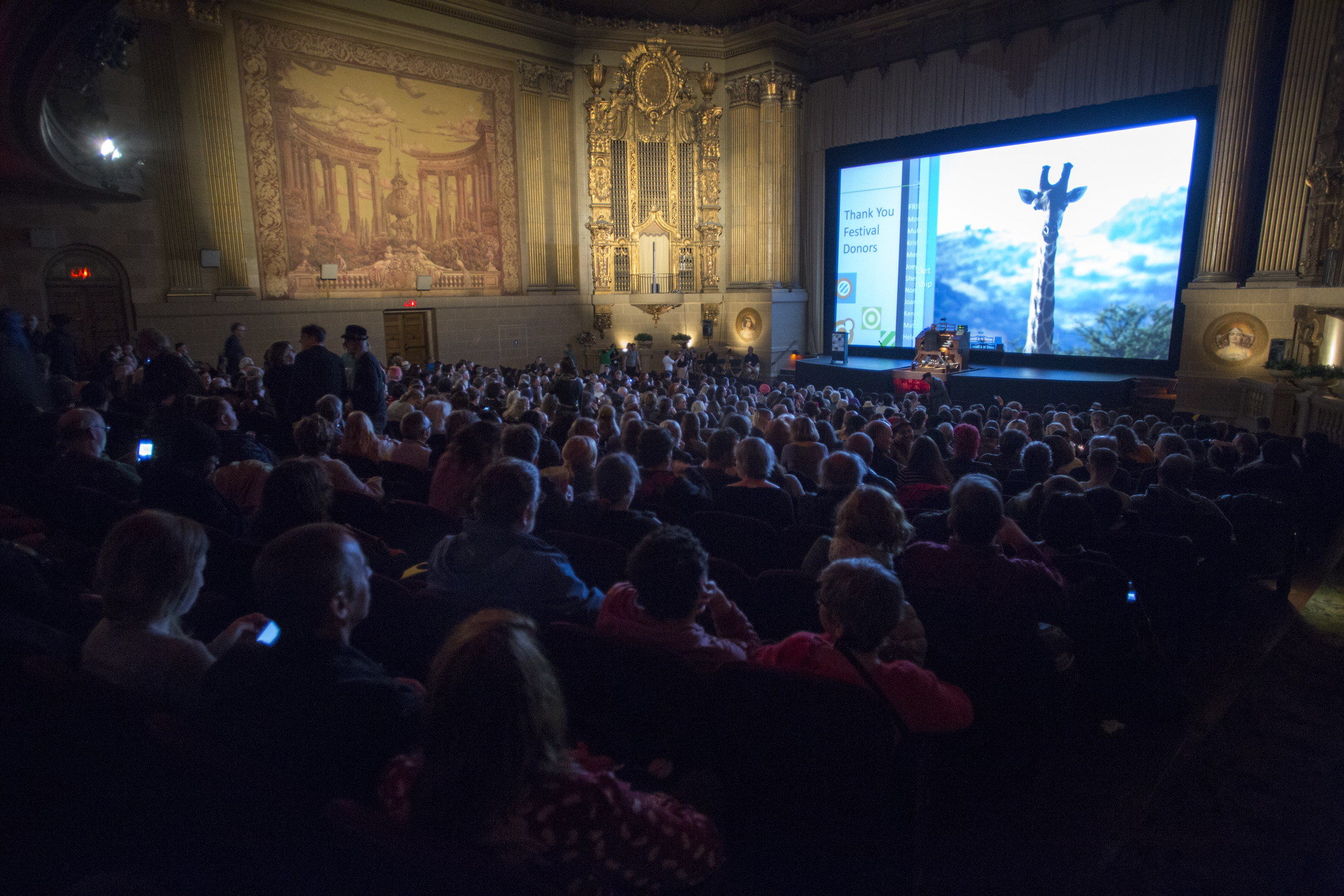
- Opening Night of the Festival at San Francisco's Castro Theatre.
- Location: San Francisco, California; United States
- Founded: 2011
- Language: International
- Website: www.greenfilmfest.org

The San Francisco Green Film Festival was an environmental film festival which was held annually from 2011 to 2019.

== History ==
The festival was founded by Rachel Caplan, who had previously worked for the Edinburgh Film Festival, the San Francisco Film Society and the San Francisco Ocean Film Festival. She created the festival to connect international environmental films and filmmakers with San Francisco Bay Area audiences and increase awareness of the climate crisis.

Over 9 years, the Festival grew from a 3-day program in one small venue to a weeklong event in multiple venues across the city, and the largest environmental film festival in the USA outside the long-established Environmental Film Festival in the Nation's Capital in Washington D.C. The festival was known for its 'Take Action' programs, encouraging audiences to get involved with local climate campaigns and causes in partnership with organisations such as Sierra Club, Greenpeace, and 350.org.

SFGFF was recognised Internationally through an official partnership with the United Nations Environment Program (UNEP) to support the Sustainable Development Goals (SDGs); and membership of the Green Film Network, a global association of 30 film festivals which focus on environmental issues. Its Science on Screen and Impact Film Forum initiatives were funded by National Endowment for the Arts.

In nine years, the festival presented over 600 feature length and short films with over 800 guests ranging from filmmakers to scientists, academics, activists, indigenous leaders and youth. Notable guests included Margaret Atwood, Annie Leonard, Fredrik Gertten, Louie Psihoyos, The Yes Men, Jonathan Franzen, Céline Cousteau, Yann Arthus-Bertrand, Josh Fox, Virginia McKenna, Ralph Eggleston, and Madonna Thunderhawk.

In 2018, the Festival was the official film presenting partner of the Global Climate Action Summit, hosted by the U.N.'s Christiana Figueres, Michael Bloomberg, and California Governor Jerry Brown.

In 2019, the Green Film Festival took place for the last time. The Opening Night event at the Castro Theater included a screening of Fredrik Gertten’s feature documentary film Push, and a conversation with U.N. Special Rapporteur on Adequate Housing, Leilani Farha.

The tenth edition was planned to be held over 10 days in September 2020, but in May it was announced that the festival would cease operations due to the COVID-19 pandemic. Around that time, it had a staff of three employees, not counting its board of directors.

The San Francisco Independent Film Festival known as San Francisco IndieFest launched the Livable Planet Festival in 2021 as a replacement for the San Francisco Green Film Festival, which folded after the COVID-19 pandemic forced cancellation of the 2020 festival and was rebranded in 2022 as the Green Film Festival of San Francisco.

== Venues ==
- Castro Theatre
- Roxie Theater
- San Francisco Public Library
- 518 Valencia
- Ninth Street Independent Film Center

== Awards ==
=== Best Feature Award ===
- 2019 - Push directed by Fredrik Gertten
- 2018 - Anote's Ark directed by Matthew Rytz
- 2017 – RISE: Standing Rock directed by Michelle Latimer
- 2016 – Catching the Sun directed by Shalini Kantayya
- 2015 – Bikes vs Cars directed by Fredrik Gertten
- 2014 – DamNation directed by Matt Stoeker, Travis Rummel and Ben Knight
- 2013 – More Than Honey directed by Markus Imhoof
- 2012 – You've Been Trumped directed by Anthony Baxter

=== Best Short Award ===
- 2019 - After the Fire directed by Derek Knowles & Spencer Seibert
- 2018 - Invisible Blanket directed by Pasha Reshikov
- 2017 – Pangolin directed by Katie Schuler & Nick Rogacki
- 2016 – Nature Rx directed by Justin Bogardus
- 2015 – Beyond Recognition directed by Michelle Grace Steinberg
- 2014 – Sticky directed by Jilli Rose
- 2013 – The Story of An Egg directed by Douglas Gayeton
- 2012 – Coalition of the Willing directed by Knife Party

=== Green Fire Award ===
Juried award introduced in 2017 for Best Bay Area Environmental Feature with $5,000 prize.

- 2019 - Artifishal directed by Josh "Bones" Murphy
- 2018 - Wilder Than Wild: Forests, Fires and the Future directed by Stephen Most & Kevin White
- 2017 – Tidewater directed by Roger Sorkin

=== Green Tenacity Award ===
- 2019 - Cooked: Survival by Zip Code directed by Judith Helfand
- 2018 - Stroop: Journey into the Rhino Horn War directed by Susan Scott (and Bonné de Bod)
- 2017 – Dead Donkeys Fear No Hyenas directed by Joakim Demmer
- 2016 – Not Without Us directed by Mark Decena
- 2015 – The Chinese Mayor directed by Zhou Hao
- 2014 – Come Hell or High Water: The Battle for Turkey Creek directed by Leah Mahan
- 2013 – Thomas Riedelsheimer (for body of work)
- 2012 – Blood in the Mobile directed by Frank Piasecki Poulsen
- 2011 – Bananas!* directed by Fredrik Gertten

=== Inspiring Lives Award ===
- 2019 - The Age of Stupid directed by Franny Armstrong
- 2018 - Food Coop directed by Tom Boothe
- 2017 – Flo Stone, founder of Environmental Film Festival in the Nation's Capital
- 2016 – Virginia McKenna, actress/activist of Born Free''
- 2015 – Landfill Harmonic directed by Brad Allgood and Graham Townsley
- 2014 – Project Wild Thing directed by David Bond
- 2013 – Bidder 70 directed by Beth and George Gage
- 2012 – Urban Roots directed by Tree Media

=== Audience Award ===
- 2019 - Motherload directed by Liz Canning
- 2018 - Patrimonio directed by Lisa F. Jackson & Sarah Teale
- 2017 – Yasuni Man directed by Ryan Killackey
- 2016 – The Babushkas of Chernobyl directed by Holly Morris and Ann Bogart
- 2015 – Landfill Harmonic directed by Brad Allgood and Graham Townsley
- 2014 – Seeds of Time directed by Sandy McLeod
- 2013 – La Source directed by Patrick Shen
- 2012 – Sushi: The Global Catch directed by Mark Hall

=== Young Filmmaker Award ===
- 2019 - Save our Planet directed by Alexis Buggs Hodgson
- 2018 - Youth Unstoppable directed by Slater Jewell-Kemker
- 2017 – The Plastic Bottle Controversy - Explained directed by Jeffery Chen
- 2016 – Escape Velocity directed by James Tralie
- 2015 – Pseudo Evolution directed by Luisa Gobel and Bruna Almeida

== Green Film Network ==
The Festival was a member of the Green Film Network, an association of worldwide environmental film festivals.
