= Haulage =

Transporting of goods or materials by road or rail

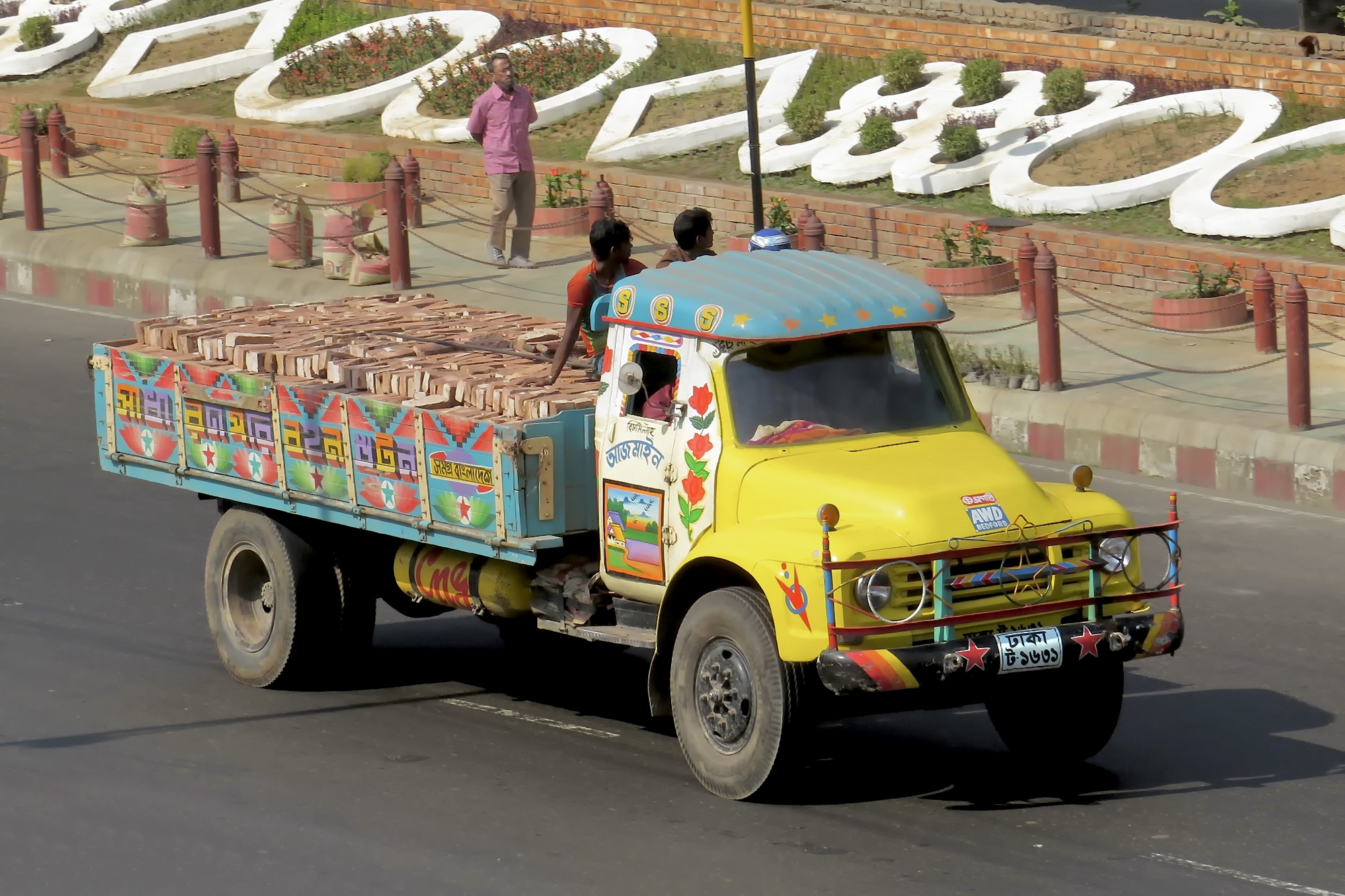
A truck hauling bricks in Bangladesh

Haulage is the business of transporting goods by road or rail between suppliers and large consumer outlets, factories, warehouses, or depots. This includes everything humans might wish to move in bulk – from vegetables and other foodstuffs, to clothes, ore, coal, and other supplies. Haulage also involves the transportation of chemicals in large sealed containers, and the removal of waste. As the word implies, goods are loaded into large trailers or carriages and hauled between different locations. Traditionally, this was by large animals such as horses or oxen – where the practice may also be called cartage or drayage. However, in the modern age, this act is mostly performed by trains or trucks – with large shipping vessels acting as intermediaries for crossing oceans. Truck drivers on haulage shifts are typically male, and often work long and difficult hours with few breaks – regularly sleeping in their vehicles overnight and eating/showering at rest stops. It is expected that Vehicular automation will largely render human drivers obsolete within a few decades.

Haulage is also known as 'horizontal transport'. This contrasts with 'vertical transport' of the same such materials with cranes, known as hoisting.

== Cost ==
Haulage fees, sometimes also simply called haulage, include the charges made for hauling freight on carts, drays, lorries, or trucks, and is incorporated for example in the cost of loading raw ore at a mine site and transporting it to a processing plant. A railway, supplying cars, may negotiate rates with customers located on another railway's line, the road granting haulage rights. This differs from trackage rights in that the host railway operates the trains for the other railway, where with trackage rights, the secondary railway operates trains over the host's tracking.

== See also ==
- Freight
- Hauling (film), a Brazilian documentary on recyclers in São Paulo
- Hauling-out
- Haul road
- Haul truck
- Heavy hauler
- Logistics
- Trackage rights
