= Hauling (film) =

2010 film directed by Sean Walsh

- Directed by: Sean Walsh
- Produced by: Sean Walsh
- Release dates: June 11, 2010 (Festival Internacional de Cinema e Video Ambiental)
- Country: Brazil
- Language: Portuguese

Hauling (Brazilian Portuguese: Efeito Reciclagem) is a 2010 Brazilian documentary film directed by Sean Walsh about poor families who work as recyclers in São Paulo.

The film premiered in the US at the San Francisco Green Film Festival in March 2011.

== Synopsis ==
The recycling underworld of São Paulo, Brazil is the background to this documentary centering on Claudinês, father to 27 children. In his green VW bus, he visits the Santa Efigênia neighborhood of São Paulo to recycle plastic, cardboard, and computers and other electronic equipment. He and his family represent the lower class of people who are discriminated against by other strata of society.
