= Sue Scott =

Sue Scott may refer to:

- Sue Scott (actress), American actress and character voice actor
- Sue Scott (politician) (born 1954), member of the Arkansas House of Representatives
- Sue Scott (sociologist), British sociologist, Professor at Glasgow Caledonian University
- Sue Reeve (née Scott, born 1951), British long jumper and hurdler

== See also ==
- Susan Scott (disambiguation)
