= Joakim Demmer =

Swedish filmmaker, screenwriter, cinematographer and editor (born 1965)

- Born: Joakim Demmer; 11 October 1965 (age 61); Nybro, Sweden
- Education: Biskops-Arnö, Sweden; Deutsche Film- und Fernsehakademie Berlin
- Occupations: Director, Screenwriter, Cinematographer, Editor, Television producer
- Years active: 1989–present

Joakim Demmer (born 11 October 1965) is a Swedish filmmaker, screenwriter, cinematographer and editor. He is best known for directing the documentary films Dead Donkeys Fear No Hyenas.

== Personal life ==
Demmer was born on 11 October 1965 in Nybro, Stockholm, Sweden.

== Career ==
He studied photography and documentary film from Biskops-Arnö, Sweden in 1989. Since then, he continued to work as a self-employed cameraman in Stockholm, Prague and London. Later in 1991, he settled in Stockholm and continued to work as a television cameraman and editor. But in 1992, Demmer moved to Oslo with a new job in the television news section as a cameraman and editor at TV2 (currently known as SVT2). Gradually, he became the co-director of the documentary department of the television. In 1995, he attended Deutsche Film- und Fernsehakademie Berlin to study filmmaking where he finally graduated in 2002. In the graduation year, he directed the film Tarifa Traffic about the refugees on the coast of Tarifa. The film was screened at many film festivals and adjudged with many awards.

With that success, he directed the second documentary Anna Lindh und ihr Mörder. In 2006, he made his maiden television directorial with three episodes of the series Fremde Kinder. Then in 2014, he wrote and directed the documentary Der Sonnenkönig der Massai. In 2017, he directed the documentary Dead Donkeys Fear No Hyenas as a joint production with Ethiopia, Germany, Finland and Netherlands. The film revolves around Farmland, the new green gold in Ethiopia where foreign investors use millions of hectares and dream of prosperity of the local people. The film received mixed reviews from critics and made official selection at many film festivals. In the Munich International Documentary Festival (DOK.fest) 2017, the film was nominated for the Viktor Award for DOK.horizons and then for Environmental Award at the Sheffield International Documentary Festival.

== Filmography ==
Year	Film	Role	Genre	Ref.
2003	Tarifa Traffic: Death in the Straits of Gibraltar	Director, writer, Editor	Documentary	
2004	Ein Tag mit Folgen: Anna Lindh und ihr Mörder	Director	Documentary	
2006	Fremde Kinder	Director, Cinematographer	TV series documentary	
2011	Big Boys Gone Bananas!	Cinematographer	Documentary	
2014	Der Sonnenkönig der Massai	Director, Cinematographer, Writer, Producer	Documentary	
2015	Bikes vs Cars	Camera operator	Documentary	
2016	Im Land der Samen - Die letzten Rentiernomaden	Director, Cinematographer, Writer, Producer	Documentary	
2017	Dead Donkeys Fear No Hyenas	Director, Cinematographer, Writer	Documentary	

== Award and accolades ==
He has received several award for his documentaries

- Prix Suisse TSR, Visions du Réel, Nyon
- 1st Prix du Concours Européen Le Mans
- 21st Robert-Geisendörfer-Preis
- Duisburger Filmwoche Audience Award
- San Francisco Green Film Festival - Green Tenacity Award
- Dokfest Munich - Honorable Mention
- One World Film Award NRW - First Prize, 2017
- Life After Oil, Best International Documentary Award
- Innsbruck Nature Film Festival - Best Film on the topic of soil
- SIMA Award, Los Angeles
- Grimme Preis 2020
