= Stroop - Journey into the Rhino Horn War =

STROOP - Journey into the Rhino Horn War
- Promotional film poster
- Directed by: Susan Scott
- Produced by: Bonné de Bod; Susan Scott
- Cinematography: Susan Scott
- Edited by: Susan Scott
- Release date: September 2018 (San Francisco Green Film Festival)
- Running time: 134 minutes
- Country: South Africa
- Language: English

STROOP - Journey into the Rhino Horn War is a 2018 South African documentary film about rhinoceros poaching made by first-time filmmakers Bonné de Bod, an SABC wildlife presenter and Susan Scott, a trained cinematographer. The title "Stroop" refers to the Afrikaans word for poach. Presented by de Bod, the film also includes the participation of Trang Nguyen, Jane Goodall and Karen Trendler. The film premiered at the San Francisco Green Film Festival in September 2018 before receiving a theatrical release in South Africa. It was released digitally worldwide on 12 February 2019.

== Synopsis ==
Initially envisioned as a six-month project, the film on the rhinoceros poaching crisis stretches into four years as Bonné de Bod and Susan Scott realise the magnitude of the epidemic. The pair gain access to wildlife rangers on the frontline in South Africa's national parks and then garner undercover footage as they travel to China and Vietnam to follow the supply and demand chain. They look at the motivations behind rhinoceros horn consumption in Asia and how South Africa's criminal justice system is responding to the challenge.

== Reception ==
The sentiment was echoed by Anton Crone writing in the Sunday Times that "This is the most emotive documentary I have ever watched and I believe that STROOP (Afrikaans for 'poach') will alter the course of rhino conservation." The film was also awarded several festival awards, including the Green Tenacity Award by judges of the San Francisco Green Film Festival ahead of its premiere.

The film was chosen to open the Wildlife Film Festival Rotterdam in October 2018. The film received a second sold-out screening following a feature on EenVandaag, a current affairs programme on the Dutch public broadcaster. It also won the festival's Flamingo Award with the jury concluding that "This is an impressive and shocking film. The Jury believes the filmmakers, guided by the great main character Bonné de Bod, have managed to show us the immense complexity of the problem of rhino poaching. This body of work is a very powerful and emotional call to action."

The film which was screened on prime time television in Hong Kong, was also screened by the Hong Kong judiciary as part of an enforcement workshop. The workshop was attended by legislators, academics from Hong Kong universities, government forensic teams, criminal justice specialists and representatives from Hong Kong’s department of justice, as well as the United Nations Office on Drugs and Crime, the Queen's Counsel from London and Hong Kong’s under secretary for the environment.
