= Gorom Refugee Settlement =

Refugee settlement in South Sudan

Gorom
- Refugee settlement
- Gorom Refugee Settlement
- Location in South Sudan
- Coordinates: 4°43′12″N 31°28′48″E
- Established: 2010

Population
  - Total: 22,000 (April 2,025)

Gorom Refugee Settlement is a United Nations–supported (UNHCR) refugee settlement located approximately 26 km south west of Juba in South Sudan. Originally established in 2010 to host around 2,500 Ethiopian refugees fleeing conflict in Gambella, the camp has since grown significantly in response to regional crises.

In 2018, the camp's medical center, run by ACROSS, was designed to serve 2,000 patients.

== History ==
By August 2023, Gorom housed over 10,000 individuals, including new arrivals from Sudan as conflict expanded. By June 2024, about 18,000 people were living there, among them roughly 7,000 from Darfur in western Sudan. A recent UN report said conditions at the site had sharply deteriorated.

The onset of anti-Sudanese violence in Juba in January 2025 precipitated another surge: over 6,800 Sudanese refugees fled to Gorom, swelling its population to 16,000 by March 2025 and more than 22,000 by April 2025—exceeding its intended capacity by a factor of five. The largest group of refugees is Anyuak Ethiopians. Gorom was reported in March 2025 to be gripped by shortages of food, water, and healthcare. A single tent at Gorom may house up to 33 people.

== LGBTQ population ==
LGBTQ people at the camp have reported discrimination and marginalization, including in education and employment. One activist reported "daily attacks, lack of police assistance, death threats, stoning, abuses, discrimination, bullying, denial of medical care, and the inability for their children to access education. Many are also deprived of proper shelter, leading to health risks such as pneumonia." Some of the LGBTQ refugees fled their countries solely because of their gender or sexual identity.
