= 50/50 (South African TV program) =

- Presented by: Bonné de Bod; Ashmund Martin; Bertus Louw; Hermien Roelvert; Mmasea Petje; Johann Botha (former); Ntokozo Mbuli (former); Erald Felix (former)
- Country of origin: South Africa

Production
- Running time: 1 hour

Original release
- Network: SABC
- Release: 8 January 1984 – present

50/50 is a South African environmental television program that has aired on SABC since 1984. The show seeks to deliver content on wildlife, conservation and environmental subjects with a focus on South Africa. The show's name 50/50 refers to the fifty fifty balance between humans and nature. It is one of the longest running environmental programs on air in the world. It has been broadcast on SABC 1, SABC 2, and SABC 3 at various times during its history; currently it is broadcast on SABC 2. It is broadcast during prime-time from 19:00 to 20:00 on Monday.

Around 80% of the show's content is in English with the remaining 20% presented in Afrikaans. A decision that was made in 2014 when the program was moved to SABC 3, previously the show's content was presented half in English and half in Afrikaans.
