= Fredrik Gertten =

Swedish filmmaker, producer and journalist

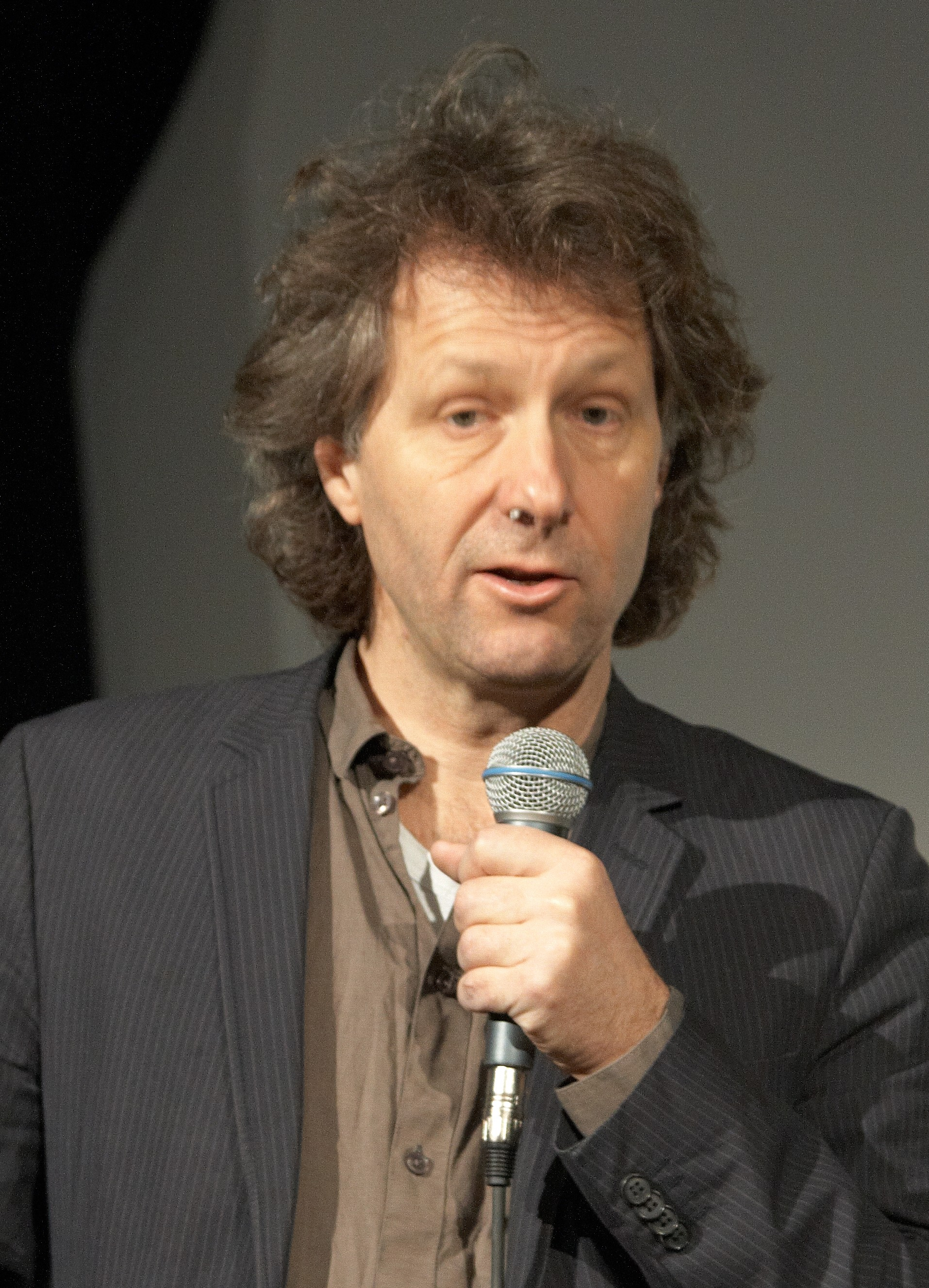
- Fredrik Gertten talar om sin film Bananas!* på Dunkers kulturhus den 27 februari 2010.
- Born: 3 April 1956
- Occupation: Film producer

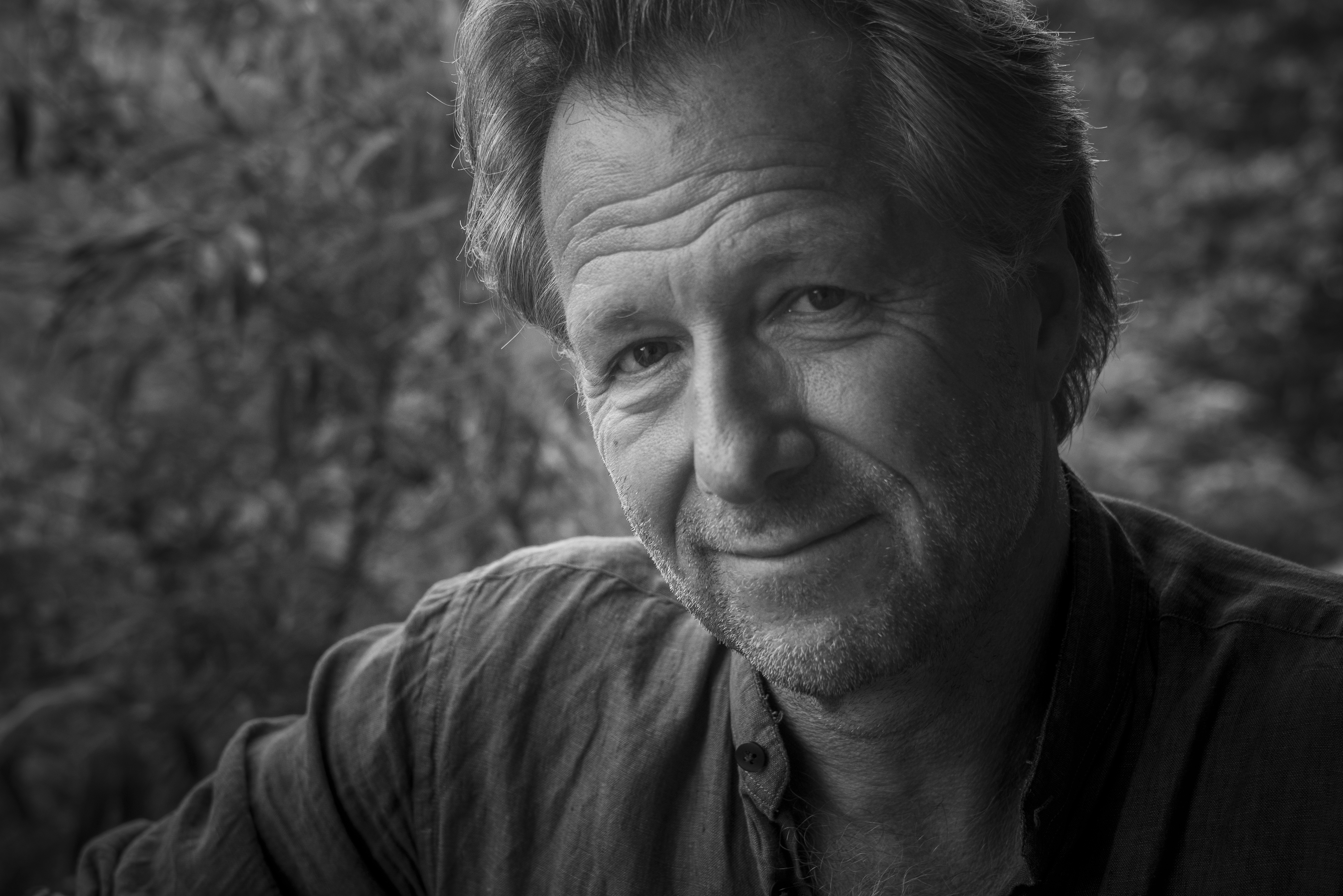
Fredrik Gertten

Fredrik Gertten (born 3 April 1956 in Malmö) is a Swedish filmmaker, producer and journalist, best known for documentaries investigating global patterns of kleptocracy, lobbyism, financialization and extractivism. His production company WG Film was founded in 1994 and is known for title such as Push (2019), Bikes vs Cars (2015) and Bananas*! (2009).

== Career in film ==
As of recently Gertten's focus has been on global issues and injustices. In Breaking Social he examines global patterns of kleptocracy and corruption. The Dutch historian and philosopher Rutger Bregman is frequently featured in the film, as is the expert Sarah Chayes, amongst others. A recurring theme in the film is how the social contract has been broken by the ultra wealthy and powerful people in our society. Therefore, a new social needs to be constructed that rewards contributors to society and those that play by the rules. The film premiered at CPH:DOX in March 2023.

The focus on global injustices can also be seen in what Gertten describes as sister films to Breaking Social. In Push worldwide issues regarding housing and the right to a home is explored with the help of FN special rapporteur on housing Leilani Farha. Bikes vs Cars looks at problems with cities adapting to cars instead of cyclists and ties into a debate regarding climate change and sustainability. Both of these films impacted society in different ways. Push affected legislation on housing in Denmark, Germany and New Zealand. Bikes vs Cars sparked a debate on how cities are structured and was acknowledged in France where Gertten was granted the "Talents du Vélo" award for promoting the bicycle as a way of transport.

Jozi Gold premiered in 2019 and was co directed by Fredrik Gertten and Sylvia Vollenhoven and co produced by WG Film and two South African filmproducers. The film tells the story of gold mines in South Africa and the consequences they have on local population. The film premiered at Encounters South African International Documentary Film Festival in June 2019. Between 1986 and 1994, Gertten worked as a foreign reporter in South Africa.

Gertten worked as a journalist for newspapers, radio and television in Africa, Latin America, Asia and Europe during the 1980s and 1990s. In 1995 he published the travel book Ung man söker världen (Young man looking for the World) through the publisher Gong Gong förlag. He worked as a columnist for the newspaper Arbetet in the 1990s and for Kvällsposten in 2001–2003. He has also worked as a producer of documentaries and entertainment shows for the Swedish television channels SVT, TV 4 and TV 3.

== Legal battle with Bananas ==
Fredrik Gertten's film Bananas!* (2009) documented the battle of Nicaraguan fruit workers against the international corporation Dole. Following the release of the film, the banana giant opted to sue Gertten, his company, and the film's producer, Margarete Jangård. The film gained wide support from the Riksdag and the case was withdrawn within two months. The battle accompanying the film led Gertten to several awards, including Anna Politkovskaya Freedom of Speech Award. The film was also awarded the Fuf-award, a yearly prize for especially meaningful efforts in international development and assistance work by the Swedish Association for Development. Following the legal case, Max, a Swedish fast-food chain, discontinued serving Dole's fruit salad at its restaurants. In addition, the sales of FairTrade bananas in Sweden increased from 5 percent market share to 10.

Big Boys Gone Bananas!* (2011), a film examining the legal process behind Bananas!*, was premiered at Sundance Film Festival and has also been shown at Toronto, IDFA and Berlinale film festivals.

== Films about Malmö ==
During the earlier years of WG Film, Gertten used Malmö as a baseline. He has both documented and critically examined the city's social transformations since the 1980s. Often co-produced, his documentaries about Malmö have addressed Malmö FF and Zlatan Ibrahimovic, in their successes and adversities (True Blue, 1998; True Blue 2; 2001; The Way Back, 2002; Becoming Zlatan, 2016).

Other Gertten's films based in Malmö address the construction of the Öresund Bridge (Walking on Water, 2000), termination of the newspaper Arbetet (The Death of a Working Man's Newspaper, 2001), demolition of the Kockums Crane (Bye Bye Malmö, 2003) and the story of the Turning Torso (The Socialist, the Architect, and the Twisted Tower, 2005).

== Awards and nominations ==
=== Push ===
- Arkitekters Kritikerpris 2019
- Winner Prix Italia Signis Special Award
- Shortlisted European Film Academy Award for Best Documentary
- Politiken Audience Award - CPH:DOX
- Docs Barcelona – Young Jury Reteena Award
- San Francisco Green Film Festival – Best Feature Award
- Life After Oil Film Festival – Special Mention
- Freedom Film Fest – Justin Louis Award Best Documentary (Feature)
- Nuremberg Human Right Film Festival – Open Eyes Youth Jury Award
- DocsMX – Premio del Jurado Global Docs Jury Award -

=== Bikes vs Cars ===
- Tempo Documentary FF – Honourable Mention
- UK Green FF – Audience Award
- Docs Against Gravity – Special Mention
- San Francisco Green FF – Best Feature
- Cinamambiente – Best Film
- Internationales Filmwochenende – Audience Award, Best Documentary
- Talents du Vélo

=== Bananas!* and Big Boys gone Bananas ===
- Los Angeles Film Festival 2009 – Nominated for Best Documentary Feature
- International Green Film Award 2010 – Nominated for 'Green Oscar'
- Anna Politkovskaya Freedom of Speech Award 2010
- Blåslampan 2013
- Fuf-award

=== Other awards ===
- LO Nordvästra Skånes Miljöpris.
- Sydsvenska Dagbladets kulturpris
- Arkitekters Kritikerpris 1999

== Filmography ==
=== As director and producer ===
- 2023 – Breaking Social
- 2019 – Jozi Gold
- 2019 – Push
- 2016 – Becoming Zlatan
- 2015 – Bikes vs Cars
- 2012 – The Invisible Bicycle Helmet (kortdokumentär)
- 2011 – Big Boys Gone Bananas!*
- 2009 – Bananas!*
- 2005 – Sossen, arkitekten och det skruvade huset (The Socialist, the Architect, and the Twisted Tower)
- 2005 – An Ordinary Family
- 2003 – Bye Bye Malmö (Just a piece of steel)
- 2002 – Vägen tillbaka – Blådårar 2 (The way back, True blue 2)
- 2002 – Poesigeneralen (The Poetry General)
- 2001 – Mordet på en tidning (The death of a working man's newspaper)
- 2001 – Resa med Siluett (Travel with Siloutte)
- 2000 – Gå på vatten (Walking on Water)
- 2000 – The Great Bridge (kortfilm)
- 1998 – Blådårar (True Blue)

=== As producer ===
- 2022 – Daughters, Jenifer Malmqvist
- 2017 – Dead Donkeys Fear No Hyenas, Joakim Demmer
- 2013 – Maria and her Shadow, Fredric Ollerstam
- 2011 – Love Always, Carolyn, Maria Ramström & Malin Korkeasalo
- 2010 – I Bought A Rainforest, Jacob Andrén & Helena Nygren
- 2008 – Burma VJ, Anders Østergaard
- 2008 – Final Image, Andrés Habbeger
- 2007 – The Leftovers, Kerstin Übelacker & Michael Cavanagh
- 2006 – Milkbar, Terese Mörnvik & Ewa Einhorn
- 2006 – Thin Ice (Tunn Is), (2006) Håkan Berthas
- 2006 – Belfast Girls, Malin Andersson
- 2003 – Love Boat, kortfilm, Anna Norberg
- 2002 – Boogie Woogie Pappa, kortfilm, Erik Bäfving
- 2000 – 30 years have passed, comrade, Lars Westman
- 1998 – Sambafotboll, Lars Westman & Fredrik Ekelund
