= Fierce Conversations =

Book by Susan Scott

Fierce Conversations: Achieving Success at Work and in Life One Conversation at a Time
- First edition
- Author: Susan Scott
- Language: English
- Published: 2002
- Publisher: Viking Press
- Publication place: United States
- Media type: Print (Paperback)
- Pages: 320
- ISBN: 0-425-19337-3
- LC Class: BJ2121 .S42 2002
- Followed by: Fierce Leadership: A Bold Alternative to the Worst "Best" Practices of Business Today

Fierce Conversations: Achieving Success at Work and in Life One Conversation at a Time is a self-help book written by Susan Scott, founder and CEO of Fierce Inc., about how to have a difficult conversation.

== Content ==
The introduction states that Fierce Conversations is a "guide to tackling your toughest challenges and enriching relationships with everyone important to your success and happiness through principles, tools, and assignments designed to direct you through your first fierce conversations with yourself on to the most challenging and important conversations facing you." The author defines a fierce conversation as "One in which we come out from behind ourselves, into the conversation and make it real." She believes that interpersonal difficulties are a direct result of our inability to communicate well. The author states that the book is based on her experience running think tanks and designing and delivering training.

- A foreword by Ken Blanchard
- "The Seven Principles of Fierce Conversations"
- "The Idea of Fierce"
- "Master the Courage to Interrogate Reality"
- "Come Out from Behind Yourself into the Conversation and Make It Real"
- "Be Here, Prepared to Be Nowhere Else"
- "Tackle Your Toughest Challenge Today"
- "Obey Your Instincts"
- "Take Responsibility for Your Emotional Wake"
- "Let Silence Do the Heavy Lifting"
- "Embracing the Principles"

== Publication history ==
The book was published by Viking in 2002 (hardcover) and then by the Berkley Publishing Group in 2004 (paperback).

== Reception ==
It has since become one of The Wall Street Journal and UPI bestseller.

Michael Brisciana has stated that "I worry that some of their most enthusiastic adherents can seem more eager for the 'fierce' (i.e., 'confrontational') part of the concept than the 'conversation'". Perhaps due to a misunderstanding of the book, they have the wrong kind of conversation.

A review in Orlando Sentinel read, "Although the truths presented by Scott are as old as common sense, she dresses them up in interesting new ways. Her pithy prose and poignant examples make for entertaining and instructive reading".

The book received mixed reception from Publishers Weekly, which wrote, "Careerist marketing ploy it may be, but this cleanly written, if cliché-laden, book boasts enough psychological sensitivity to merit success".
