= Big Boys Gone Bananas!* =

2011 film by Fredrik Gertten

- Film poster
- Directed by: Fredrik Gertten
- Written by: Fredrik Gertten
- Produced by: Margarete Jangård
- Release dates: 19 November 2011 (IDFA); 24 February 2012 (Sweden)
- Running time: 90 minutes
- Country: Sweden

Big Boys Gone Bananas!* is a 2011 documentary film, directed by Fredrik Gertten. The film is about how Gertten's film company was sued by Dole for the 2009 documentary film Bananas!*. This lawsuit is a type of case known as a strategic lawsuit against public participation (SLAPP).

== Film ==
Big Boys Gone Bananas!* focuses primarily on the lawsuit, rather than the subject of worker exploitation or mistreatment that was the focus of Bananas!*.

The film concerns events that began when Dole sent a cease-and-desist letter to the filmmaker, the 2009 Los Angeles Film Festival, and the festival’s sponsors, that alleged that Bananas!* was false and defamatory, though the film had not yet been screened.

In June, a scathing review of Bananas!* appeared on the front page of the Los Angeles Business Journal. The Los Angeles Film Festival removed the film from the competition and screened it separately as a "case study" rather than a documentary. Many critics saw this procedure as undermining the original documentary's claims.

In July 2009, Dole filed a lawsuit for defamation against Gertten, claiming that Bananas!* did not show that the original lawsuit by the banana workers was thrown out of court: "To screen, promote, and profit from this film, despite the fact that its entire premise has been (judged) a fraud on Dole and California’s courts, is the epitome of reckless and irresponsible conduct." Multiple news organizations reported that entertainment lawyer David Ginsburg submitted a document on Dole's behalf that compared Bananas!* to anti-Semitic Nazi propaganda.

European channels screened Big Boys Gone Bananas!* and there was a threatened boycott of Dole fruits in Sweden. Dole withdrew the suit.

Gertten describes the film's themes thus:

Today, independent documentary films are more important than ever. These films are the last bastions of truth telling. Traditional media outlets have less money for investigative reporting and many are owned by corporate entities that have an influence on the news and its presentation and distribution.

== Reception ==
The film was positively reviewed in major newspapers. Most reviewers described how the film demonstrated how easily media companies and journalists, especially in the United States, caved quickly to the threat of negative publicity generated by Dole's lawsuit. Numerous critics invoked the phrase "David and Goliath" in reference to the difference between an independent filmmaker and a multinational corporation.

One critic in the Los Angeles Times remarked that the film did not examine allegations of fraud against workers’ attorneys in the first film.

The review in The Hollywood Reporter described the film as "of limited commercial interest, though it raises issues with broad appeal." The film's Skype interviews with Gertten were also critiqued.

== Film festivals ==
- World premiere: International Documentary Film Festival Amsterdam, November 19, 2011.
- United States premiere: Sundance Film Festival, January 2012.
- Canadian premiere: Hot Docs Canadian International Documentary Festival, May 2, 2012.

=== Awards ===
- 2013: Runner Up for the People’s Choice Award at Hot Docs Canadian International Documentary Festival
