= Bananas!* =

2009 film by Fredrik Gertten

- Directed by: Fredrik Gertten
- Produced by: Margarete Jangård; Lise Lense-Møller; Bart Simpson
- Starring: See below
- Cinematography: Joseph Aguirre; Frank Pineda
- Edited by: Jesper Osmund
- Music by: Nathan Larson
- Production company: novemberfilm
- Distributed by: Oscilloscope Laboratories
- Release date: 20 June 2009
- Running time: 87 minutes
- Country: Sweden
- Language: English

Bananas!* is a 2009 Swedish documentary directed by Fredrik Gertten about a conflict between the Dole Food Company and banana plantation workers in Nicaragua over alleged cases of sterility caused by the pesticide DBCP.

The film was criticized by Dole for containing "patent falsehoods". After a screening at the Los Angeles Film Festival in June 2009, Gertten was sued for defamation by Dole on 8 July. The lawsuit was preceded by threats of legal action from Dole aimed against the LA Film Festival, which resulted in sponsors pulling support and the film being removed from competition. Dole dropped their lawsuit against Fredrik Gertten and Bananas!* on 15 October 2009.

In September 2009, the Swedish parliament members Mats Johansson (M) and Luciano Astudillo (S) took the initiative of displaying the movie in the Parliament of Sweden, this being its premiere in Sweden.

In late 2010 a court in Los Angeles decided in favor of the movie crew, making it possible to release the film in the US. A judge awarded the filmmakers nearly $200,000 in fees and costs.

In 2011, Gertten directed the film Big Boys Gone Bananas!* about how the company was sued by Dole.

== Cast ==
- Byron Rosales Romero
- Juan J. Dominguez
- Duane Miller
- Rick McKnight
- David Delorenzo
- Mercedes Del Carmen Romero

== See also ==
- Oscilloscope Laboratories
