= Bonné de Bod =

South African TV presenter and documentary film producer

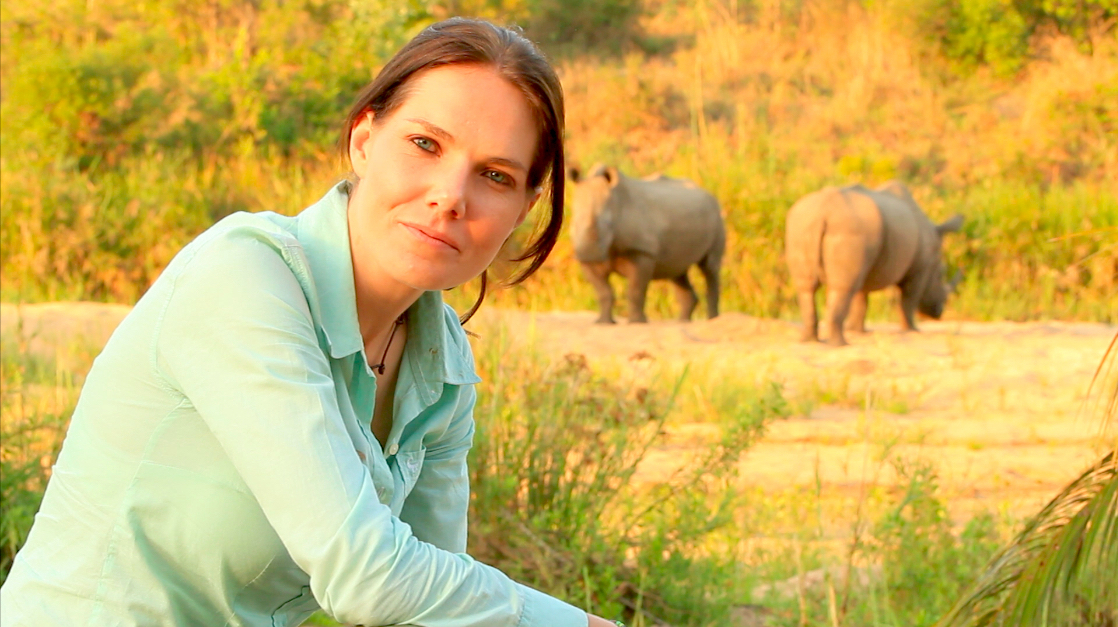
- Bonné de Bod in 2015
- Born: 11 June 1981 (age 45); Kempton Park, South Africa
- Education: University of Pretoria
- Occupations: Television presenter, documentary film producer
- Known for: Presenter and producer of the documentary STROOP - Journey into the Rhino Horn War

Bonné de Bod (born 11 June 1981) is a South African television presenter and documentary film producer. She is best known for her film STROOP - Journey into the Rhino Horn War. She is also noted for field reporting on the nature television series 50/50 for seven seasons. Recognition for her television presenting include a Jackson Wild Media Award nomination for 'Best Host/Presenter' in 2019 a SANParks Kudu Award for 'Best Journalist' in the years 2015 and 2019 and two Impact DOCS for 'Best On-Camera Talent' and 'Best Narration/Voice-Over Talent' in 2021. She has won over 30 awards as a film producer.

== Early life and education ==
De Bod was born in Kempton Park, South Africa and brought up in Northcliff, Johannesburg. She has a B.Com in Industrial Psychology from the University of Pretoria.

== Career ==
After graduation a modelling agency offered De Bod a modelling contract in Cape Town. She accepted and located to Cape Town where she modelled for three years. This was followed by an offer from London but she followed her passion for wildlife and aced the audition to become a presenter on South Africa's 50/50, the well-known environmental and natural history television show, remaining there for seven seasons.

=== STROOP - Journey into the Rhino Horn War ===
In 2008, rhino poaching was a growing problem in South Africa. In 2013 a story involving rhino poaching which De Bod made with film director, Susan Scott in Kruger National Park, inspired the pair to create the documentary STROOP - Journey into the Rhino Horn War. Filmed over four years, STROOP, showed the complete chain from African poachers to Asian consumers. An official selection at 40 film festivals, the film has won 30 awards. Anton Crone of The Sunday Times wrote in a newspaper article that De Bod and Scott's ability to engage with people, "whether vulnerable, dangerous or courageous, [gave] the film it's human depth". The Mercury said that De Bod is tough as nails.

=== Kingdoms of Fire, Ice and Fairy Tales ===
De Bod's second film, also with Scott, Kingdoms of Fire, Ice and Fairytales, premiered at Jackson Wild in 2020, winning several awards as well as receiving positive reviews. Kingdoms was filmed and edited during the COVID-19-pandemic. The pair devised 'Kingdoms of Fire, Ice & Fairy Tales' in California while on the film festival circuit. De Bod has been praised for her presenting in Kingdoms by notable film critic, Leon van Nierop, and by Getaway Magazine, that calls De Bod "the protagonist, with an authentic, assured voice whose screen presence reflects the beauty of the environment she is exploring". In 2015, De Bod also worked on Rhino Blog (known as Rhino Planet outside of Africa), airing on People's Weather. She received the SANParks Kudu Award for 'Best Journalist' in 2015 for her work on 50/50 and again in 2019 together with Scott for STROOP. De Bod was asked by the United Nations Environment Programme (UNEP) to moderate a panel discussion on Illegal Wildlife Trade at the 2015 World Forestry Congress.

== Personal life ==
De Bod lives in Bryanston, and is a member of the Documentary Filmmakers Association (DFA).

== Television, filmography and awards ==
Year	Title	Role	Awards
2010–2016	50/50	Presenter, producer, Researcher	SANParks Kudu Award for Best Journalist; SANParks Kudu Award for Best Programme; ATKV-Mediaveertjie (Afrikaans for 'Media Feather')
2018–2019	STROOP - Journey into the Rhino Horn War	Presenter, Producer	SANParks Kudu Award for Best Journalist; 30 awards for Producing
2020	Kingdoms of Fire, Ice and Fairy Tales	Presenter, Producer	Impact DOCS – Award of Excellence, Best On-screen Talent; Impact DOCS – Award of Excellence, Best Narrator; Further awards for producing
