= Kyaw Kyaw Naing =

Burmese-American musician (born 1964)

Kyaw Kyaw Naing ကျော်ကျော်နိုင်
- Born: 1964 (age 60–61); Burma
- Genres: Burmese folk music
- Occupation: Musician
- Instrument: Pat waing

Kyaw Kyaw Naing (Burmese: ကျော်ကျော်နိုင်; born 1964) is a Burmese traditional hsaing waing musician known for introducing Burmese folk music to the world stage. He is a master of the pat waing, a traditional Burmese drum-circle instrument; the player sits in the middle of a horseshoe-shaped shell made of elaborately carved wood and decorated with gold leaf. He is the only known American-based hsaing proponent.

== Early life ==
Naing was born c. 1964 to Sein Chit Tee, the director of the Burmese national hsaing orchestra, and Aye Kyi, a dance instructor. The last Burmese orchestra to play in New York City was in 1975 at the Asia Society. It was led by Naing's father, U Sein Chit Tee, who performed in Malaysia, Thailand, Singapore, the former Soviet Union, the United Kingdom and the United States.

Naing's father was teaching his elder brother to play the pat waing. He remembers that, at the age of four years, he would sit and watch his older brother struggle to play during a lesson. He learned to play quite well just from observing his father and brother. From then on, his father decided that Naing would study the pat waing and patala, and his brother would specialize in vocals.

Naing started learning the classical Burmese repertory at six years of age. He won second prize at a pattala (bamboo xylophone) competition in Mandalay. Then he won first prize at the Burmese Era 3000 competition and some other prizes as well. His mother wanted very much for him to be a musician, but his father did not because of the hardships of a traditional musician's life.

== Career ==
=== Career in Burma ===
From 1985 to 1999, Naing directed Burma's national saing orchestra.

In 1999, the University of California at Los Angeles (UCLA) invited Naing to give a performance. After visiting England, he came to Los Angeles along with Asian and European musicians. His intention was to stay for a short while and go home. But when he was at UCLA, he was amazed that Burmese music did not exist there. He saw musical instruments from many countries, but not a single Burmese musical instrument—not even a harp or a xylophone. He was inspired to introduce Burmese music to America and to help the Burmese community in the United States. In 1999, he went into exile in the United States.

Many of the instruments and sets which have been shipped from Burma belong to Naing's family. He has slowly been building a career as a Burmese musician. Evan Ziporyn from Bang on a Can All-Stars invited him to a workshop at MIT. He has since performed with Bang on a Can and toured with a group from UCLA.

Naing said that, like jazz musicians, Burmese players "look at one another and listen to the tune and play accordingly... even though they might play the same piece of music, the next time they play it differently." When asked if it sounds anything like jazz, he laughed and said, "No, it's totally different."

=== Introducing the pat waing to America ===
Naing performed with Western musicians for the first time with the Bang on a Can All-Stars. In 2001, he performed on "The Bang on a Can Marathon Music" at the Brooklyn Academy of Music in New York City. In February 2002, he appeared at the Lincoln Center with the Bang on a Can All-Stars.

On December 13, 2003 at the Asia Society in Manhattan, Naing, together with 12 other musicians and 7 dancers, performed a full ensemble of Burmese traditional music and dance (Burmese orchestra) for the first time in almost 30 years. This performance was organized by Rachel Cooper of the Asia Society.

In 2004, he released an album, Bang on a Can Meets Kyaw Kyaw Naing, with special guest Todd Reynolds (formerly of ETHEL), is steeped in the Burmese tradition. The New York Times called his music "an exhilarating tease, defying expectations of symmetry or steady tempo."

As of 2005, Naing lived in Sunnyside, Queens, New York.

== Discography ==
- Bang on a Can Meets Kyaw Kyaw Naing (2004)

== Traditional hsaing waing musicians ==
In Burma, the hsaing waing percussion/gong ensemble for centuries, has been central to musical and dramatic arts in Burmese culture. Hsaing musicians served the Burmese royal court in the past, and continue to perform in concerts of Bala Hsaing (instrumental music), Zat Hsaing (music for dance-drama troupe performances or Zat Pwe), and Nat Hsaing (performances for the propitiation ceremonies of Nat spirits or "Nat Pwe").

The leader of the Hsaing Waing plays a set of 21 pitched drums hung on a circle frame known as the "pat waing". The most famous pat waing musician/composer was Sein Beda (1882-1942) who traveled to Ratanagiri, India to perform for King Thibaw - deposed by the British in 1885 - lived.

== Sources ==
- Burmese Encyclopedia, Vol. 4, P. 251 "Saing Saya" - printed in 1962.
