= Music of Myanmar =

The music of Myanmar (or Burma) (Burmese: မြန်မာ့ဂီတ) shares many similarities with other musical styles in the region. Traditional music is melodic, having its own unique form of harmony, often composed with a 4/4 (na-yi-se), a 2/4 (wa-let-se) or a 8/16 (wa-let-a-myan) time signature. In Burmese, music segments are combined into patterns and then into verses, making it a multi-level hierarchical system. Various levels are manipulated to create a song. Harmony in Mahagita (the Burmese body of music) is known as twe-lone, which is similar to a chord in Western music. For example, C is combined with F or G.

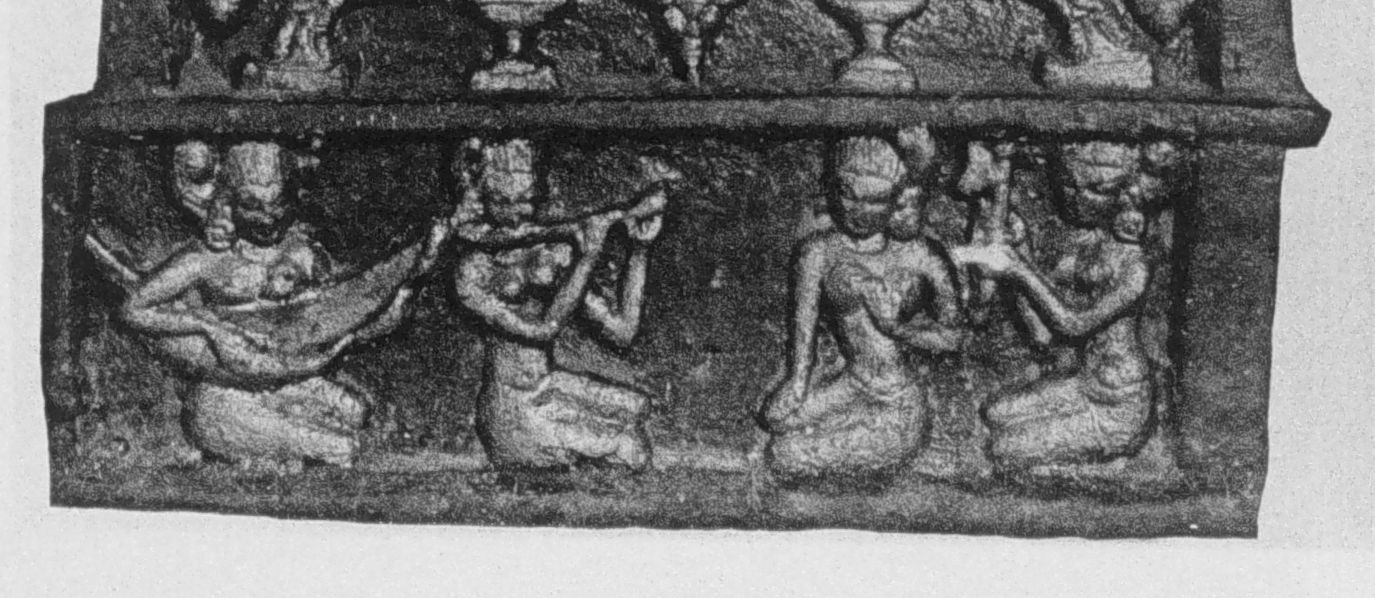
12th century AD. sculpture from the Ananda Temple at Bagan, showing women playing harp, flute, singing, and playing clappers.

Musical instruments include the brass se (which is like a triangle), hne (a kind of oboe), the bamboo wa, as well as the well-known saung, a boat-shaped harp. Traditionally, the instruments are classified into five groups called pyissin turiya (ပဉ္စင်တူရိယာ). These instruments are played on a musical scale consisting of seven tones, each associated with an animal that is said to be the producer of the tone. Each tone can be raised, lowered, or played naturally (corresponding to sharp, flat or natural), resulting in twenty-one possible combinations. The pat waing drum circle, for example, consists of twenty-one drums, one tuned to each tone in each possible combination. Similarly, the Kyi Waing, a twenty-one gong instrument, is struck with a knobbed stick placed alongside the pat waing.

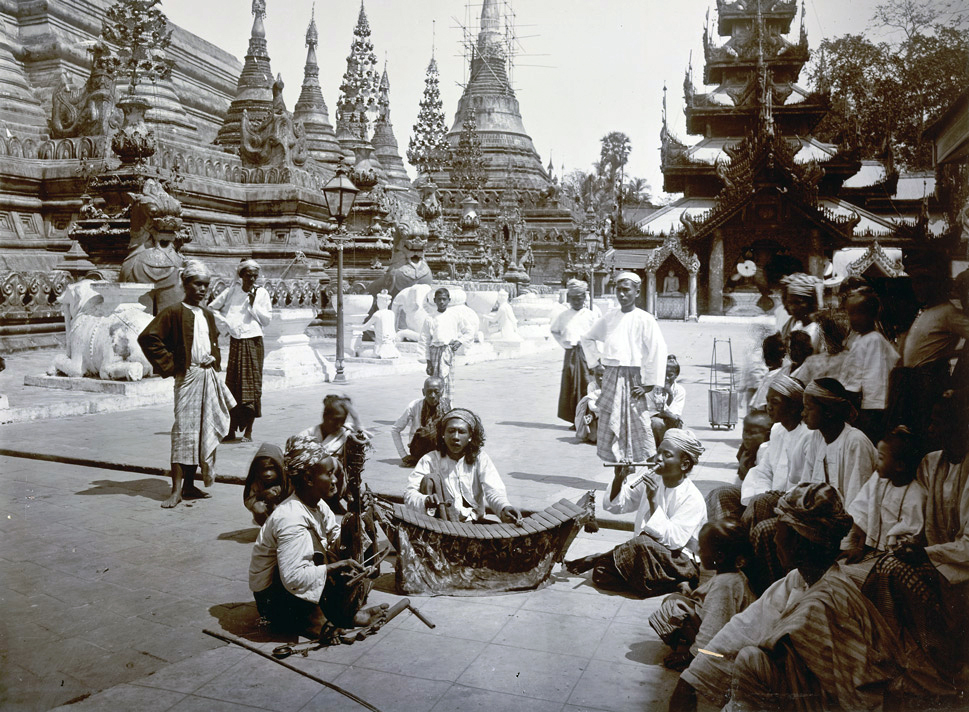
Burmese musicians performing at the Shwedagon Pagoda in 1895

Western music gained popularity in Burma during the 1930s, despite the government's intervention. During the socialist era, musicians and artists were subject to censorship by the Press Scrutiny Board and Central Registration Board, as well as laws like the State Protection Law. Classical music was also introduced during the British occupation. Pop music emerged in the 1970s and was banned by state-run radio stations. However, many artists circumvented this censorship by producing albums in private studios and releasing them in music production shops. Rock music, called stereo in Burmese, has been a popular form of music since the 1980s. When the country's regulations on censorship were loosened in 2000, many pop groups emerged throughout Myanmar, such as Electronic Machine, Playboy, ELF Myanmar, and the King. In August 2012, state censorship on music was officially abolished.

== Traditional music ==
=== Classical traditions ===
The orthodox Theravada Buddhism rejects music as being decadent, but despite this cultural backdrop, the Burmese monarchy, along with the infusion of different regional music styles, created several classical traditions of Burmese music. The oldest of such influences may perhaps come from China, which shares a similar pentatonic musical scale as classical Burmese music. Other influences include Mon music (called Talaing than or "sounds of the Talaing [Mon]"), particularly in the Mahāgīta (မဟာဂီတ), the complete body of classical Burmese music.

A prevailing one is called yodaya (ယိုးဒယား), which is essentially a class of Burmese adaptations to songs accompanied with the saung gauk and come from the Ayutthaya kingdom (modern-day Thailand) during the reigns of Bayinnaung (1551–1581) and Hsinbyushin (1753–1776), which brought back a variety of cultural traditions including the Ramayana. The primary indigenous form is called thachin (သချင်း).

Burmese classical music ensembles can be divided into outdoor and indoor ensembles. The outdoor musical ensemble is the sidaw (စည်တော်); also called sidawgyi (စည်တော်ကြီး), which was an outdoor ensemble in royal courts used to mark important ceremonial functions like the royal ploughing ceremony. It consists of a hnegyi (နှဲကြီး), a large double reed pipe and sidaw (စည်တော်), a pair of ceremonial drums, as well as the si (စည်း) and wa (ဝါး), a bell and clapper and the gandama, a double-headed drum. Today, sidaw music is played at festivals. Other instruments used in classical music include the saung (a harp) and pattala (a xylophone). The indoor form is the chamber music ensemble, which basically comprises a female singer accompanied by a traditional ensemble consisting of the saung (စောင်း), pattala (ပတ္တလား), migyaung (မိကျောင်း, a zither), palwe (ပလွေ, a flute) and in the past also included the tayaw (တယော, a fiddle) and hnyin (a small mouth organ).

=== Mahagita ===
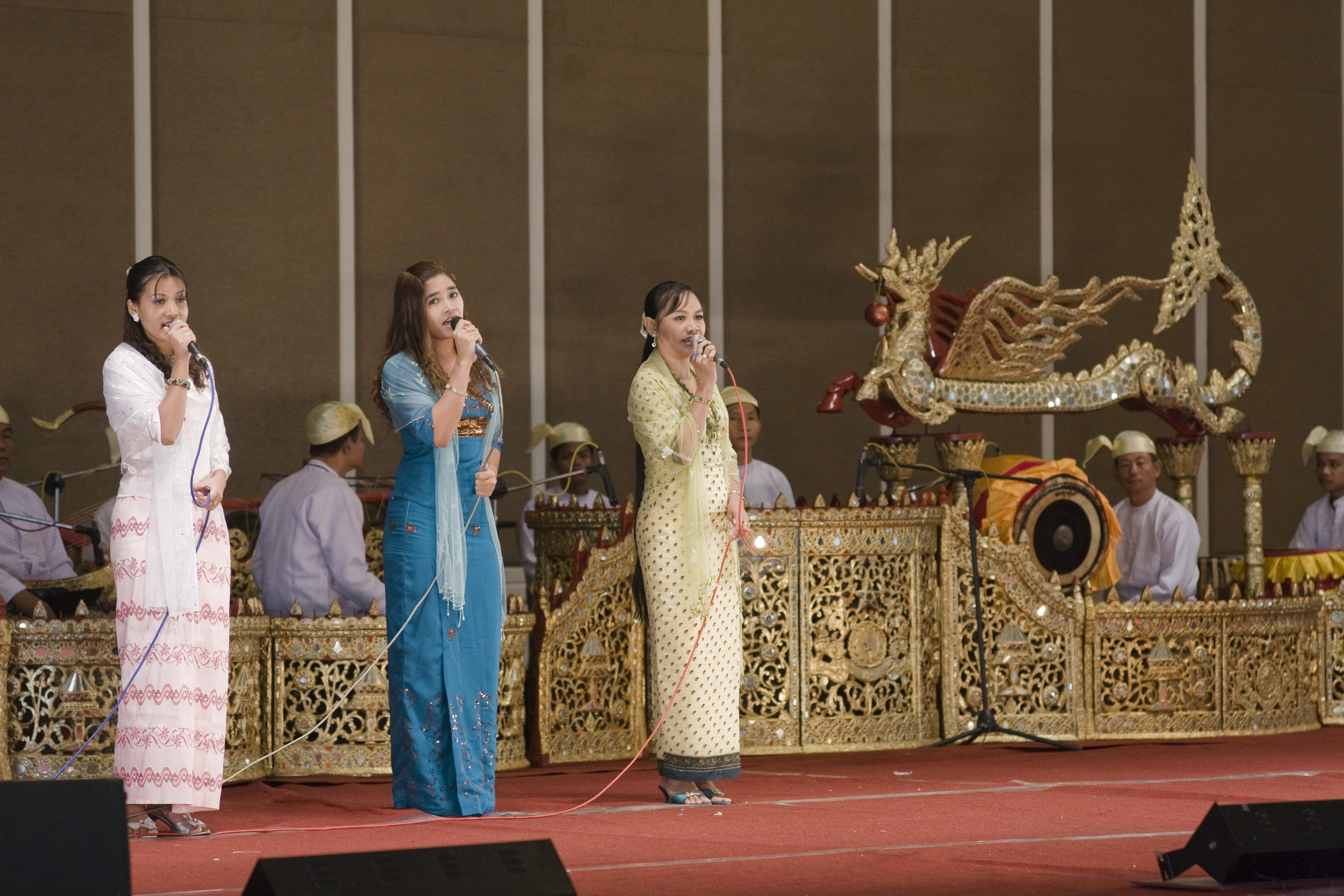
Classical Burmese singers perform at a state luncheon reception in Naypyidaw.

Translated as "great music" in Pali, the Mahāgīta is an extensive collection of Burmese classical songs called thachin gyi. The collection is divided into several different types of songs including the following: kyo, bwe, thachin gan, the oldest repertoires; pat pyo, royal court music; lwan chin, songs of longing; lay dway than gat; myin gin, music that makes horses dance; nat chin, songs used to worship the nat, Burmese spirits; yodaya, music introduced from Ayutthaya, talaing than, music adapted from the Mon people and bole, songs of sorrow.

=== Folk traditions ===
Burmese music includes a variety of folk traditions, a distinct form of which is called the byaw (ဗျော), often played at religious festivals and sung to the beat of a long and thin drum, with occasional interruptions by the beating of a larger drum.

The traditional folk ensemble, typically used in nat pwe (Burmese theatre, art and festivals) is called the hsaing waing (ဆိုင်းဝိုင်း). It is mainly made up of different gongs and drums, as well as other instruments, depending on the nature of performance. The ensemble bears many similarities to other Southeast Asian ensembles, although it incorporates a drum circle not found in similar ensembles. The ensemble is made up of a series of drums and gongs, including the center pieces, which are the hne (double reed pipe) and pat waing, a set of 21 tuned drums in a circle.

Other instruments in this ensemble include the kyi waing (ကြေးဝိုင်း, small bronze gongs in a circular frame) and maung hsaing (မောင်းဆိုင်း, larger bronze gongs in a rectangular frame), as well as the si and wa (bell and clapper) and the recent addition of the chauk lone bat (a group of six drums which have gained currency since the early 20th century). Hsaing waing music, however, is atypical in Southeast Asian music, characterised by sudden shifts in rhythm and melody as well as change in texture and timbre.

== Popular music ==
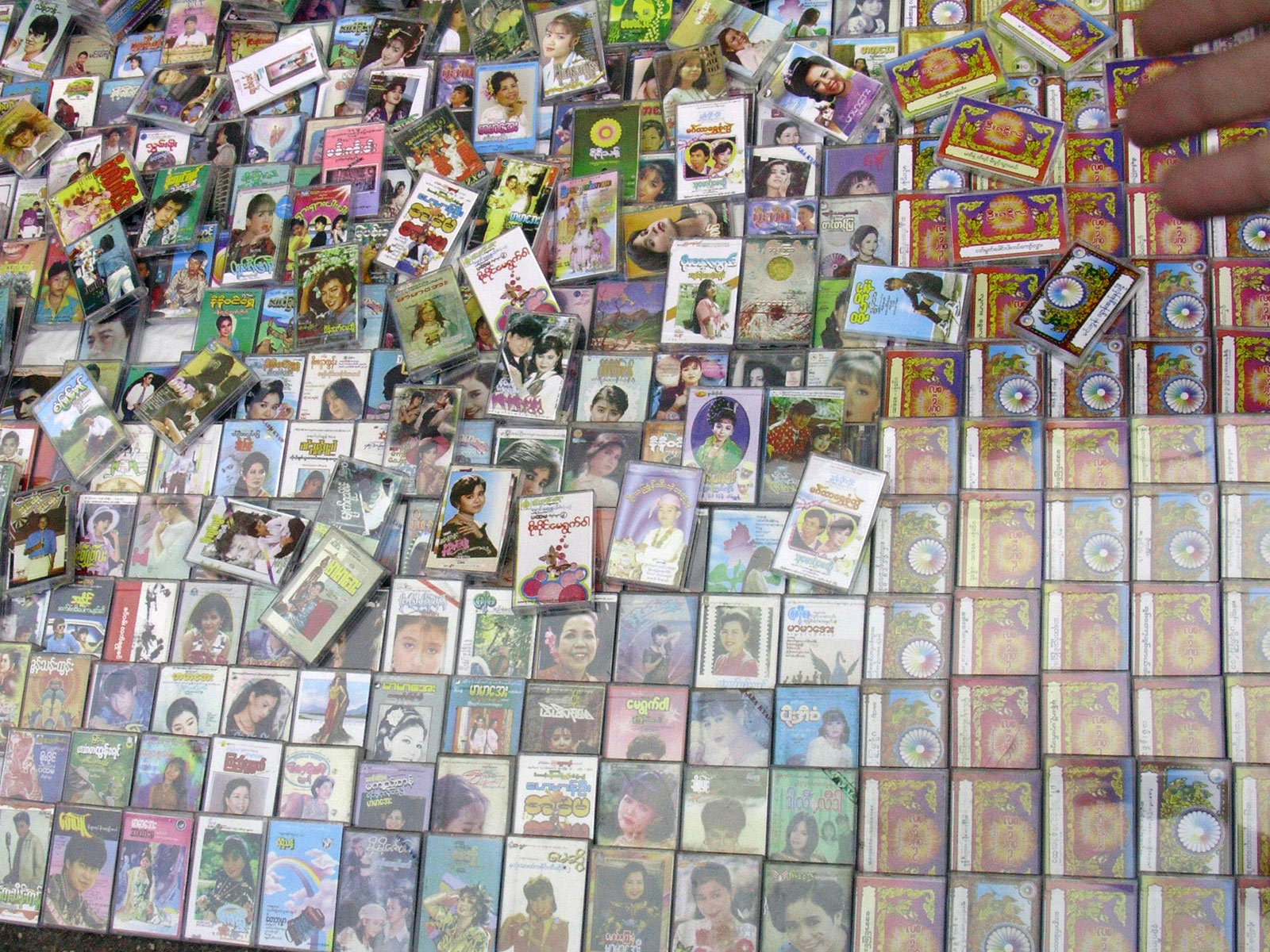
Burmese music cassette tapes, Yangon, Myanmar, in 2006

=== Early beginnings ===
Among the surviving recordings of Burmese music from the 1920s are "Hpon Daw Bwe" by obscure female singer Ma Thin, who recorded the song in 1921 with the assistance of British engineer George Dillnutt of His Master's Voice (HMV). Another is a song adaptation of the poem Son Nant Tha Myaing: Sha Pon Gyi, performed by singer Yadana Myit and saung gauk player Taung Dwin U Kyawt for HMV around 1928; Yadana Myit later became a film actress due to her singing career.

Western music has gained popularity in Burma since the 1930s. Despite the government's intervention at times, especially during the socialist era, popular Burmese music has seen considerable influence from Western music, which consists of popular Western songs rendered in Burmese and pop music similar to other Asian pop tunes. Classical music was also introduced during the British occupation. Cult folk musician Nick Drake was born in Burma during British rule.

Rock music, called stereo in Burmese, has been a popular form of music since the 1980s, having been introduced in the 1960s. Pop music emerged in the 1970s and was banned by state-run radio stations. However, many artists circumvented this censorship by producing albums in private studios and releasing them in music production shops. During the socialist era, musicians and artists were subject to censorship by the Press Scrutiny Board and Central Registration Board, as well as laws like the State Protection Law. During this period, the arrival of various bands including the influential Thabawa Yinthwenge (The Wild Ones), which included lead singer Sai Htee Saing, an ethnic Shan, in 1973 paved the way for ethnic minority musicians to gain visibility in the Burmese music industry. Sai Kham Leik is a well known composer associated with The Wild Ones. Other contemporary singers were Khin Maung Toe, Kaiser, Hlwan Moe, Htoo Ein Thin, Soe Lwin Lwin, Saung Oo Hlaing, Lay Phyu, May Sweet, Maykhala, and Connie.

=== 1980s-1990s ===
During the 8888 Uprising, restrictions loosened and many artists began writing music with themes of freedom and democracy. However, after the State Law and Order Restoration Council usurped power in 1988, the Press Scrutiny Board was reformed to censor specific political and social issues, including poverty, the sex trade, democracy, and human rights. The Myanmar Music Asiayon (MMA) was established by the SLORC to further censor Burmese-produced music. Popular musicians including Zaw Win Htut and Sai Htee Saing have produced propaganda albums written by military officers such as Mya Than San.

Hip hop and rap emerged in the late 1990s and are now the prevailing genres of music among Burmese youth today. Bands like Iron Cross, Emperor and BigBag are popular among older Burmese and certain groups of youth. There are hip-hop enthusiasts all over Burma with Burmese hip-hop artists such as Ye Lay, Sai Sai Kham Hlaing, and J-me. There are also many underground rock and metal bands such as All Else I Fail, Last Day of Beethoven, Temper Level VIII, Tha Ta Lin Chate, Idiots, Offkeys, We Are the Waste, The Last Secret, etc. but mostly producing nu-metal and metalcore. As for heavy metal, the scene is growing steadily but remains less popular compared to mainstream music. Despite very few metal bands in Burma, the metal band aficionado society is united and supportive of raw black metal, thrash metal, and death metal. Burmese cover songs (particularly from Asia) represented early pop music in the country as artists recorded and performed "copy tunes," which were reproductions of international pop songs performed in Burmese. Singers such as Min Min Latt paved the way for other artists such as Myanmar's version of Lady Gaga, Phyu Phyu Kyaw Thein, R Zarni and Sai Sai Kham Leng.

=== 2000s-present ===
When the country's regulations on censorship were loosened in 2000, new pop groups emerged across Myanmar who were able to compose, record and perform original Burmese music. Many pop groups emerged throughout Myanmar, such as Electronic Machine, Playboy, ELF Myanmar and the King. In August 2012, state censorship on music was officially abolished. The only government censorship that remains on music is video censorship. Everyone can, in essence, release whatever they want. This has led many on the newly re-grouped Myanmar Music Association to grapple with the idea of forming a rating system to deal with some 'rude words' in music that may not be appropriate for all ages.

After decades underground, a small but enduring punk rock and heavy metal music scene has been increasingly visible in Burma. Modelling many 1970s and '80s classic Western punk bands and Modern Metal. Burmese punk bands and metal bands show a musical defiance that has not been seen before in Burma. In the German-made 2012 documentary film "Yangon Calling" over a period of six weeks, filmmakers Alexander Dluzak and Carsten Piefke secretly filmed, documenting the Burmese punk's life, documenting everything from meeting friends and family, visiting rehearsals and filming secret concerts.

Websites that have started up in recent years, such as Myanmar Xbands, have given attention to the Burmese punk scene along with other alternative Burmese music. The site has developed into a hub for artists to display their music to a Burmese and international audience for free download. Most of the Talented Bands Like Last Day of Beethoven, Darkest Tears from My Heart, Fever 109, We Are the Waste, are well known by others because of this website. While other Burmese punk bands like pop punk band Side Effect, turned to raising funds on IndieGoGo, to release their first album. The band just managed to raise enough funds to release their album in May 2012, shortly before their efforts fell short due to international sanctions. However, other popular Burmese punk bands such as No Uturn or Rebel Riot has turned to self-release, releasing their demos on popular download sites such as MySpace and Reverb Nation.

== Musical instruments ==
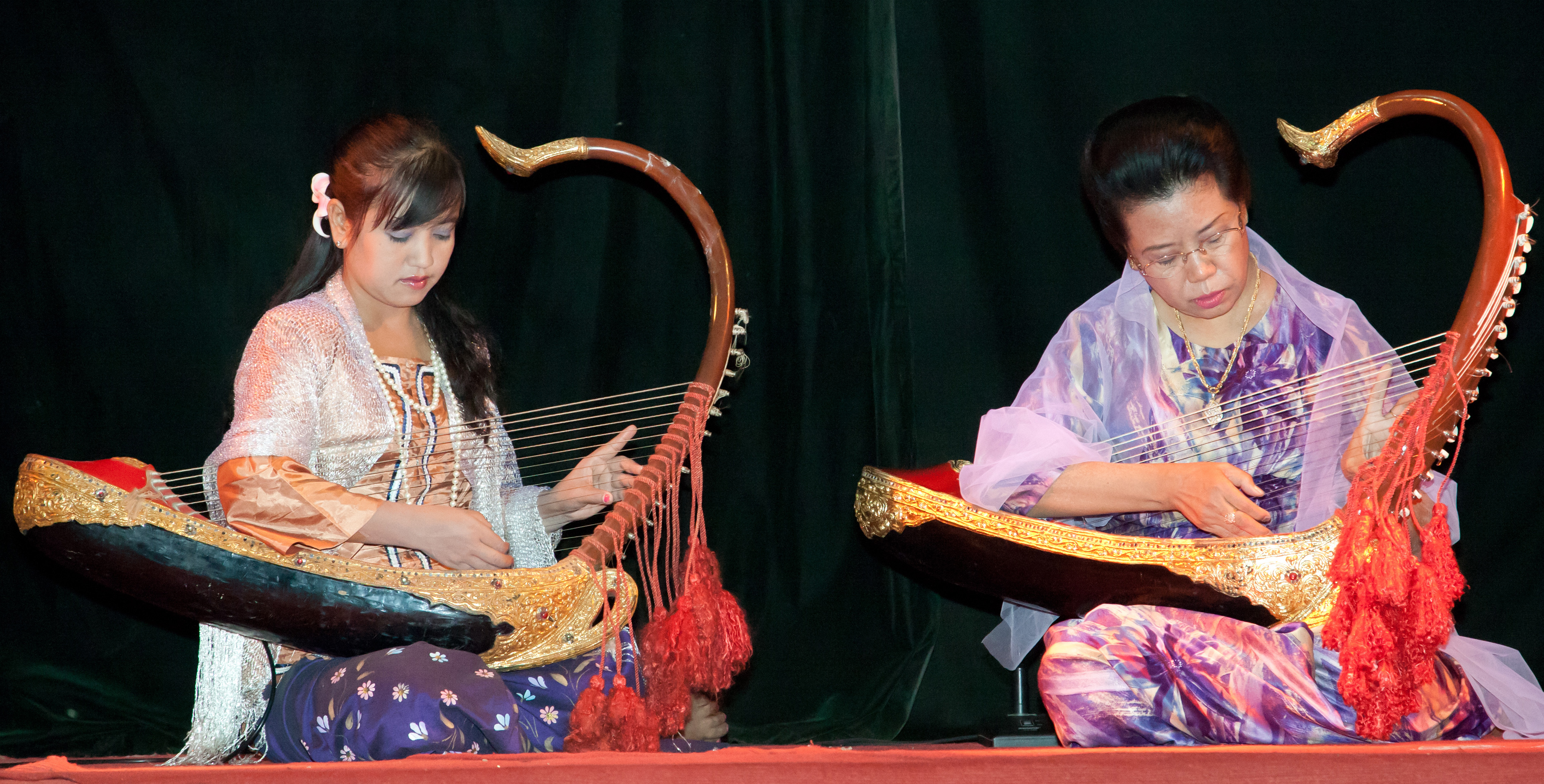
Two female musicians play the saung at a performance in Mandalay.

Burmese music has a wide variety of musical instruments, including the brass se (which is like a triangle), hne (a kind of oboe) and bamboo wa, as well as the well-known saung, a boat-shaped harp.

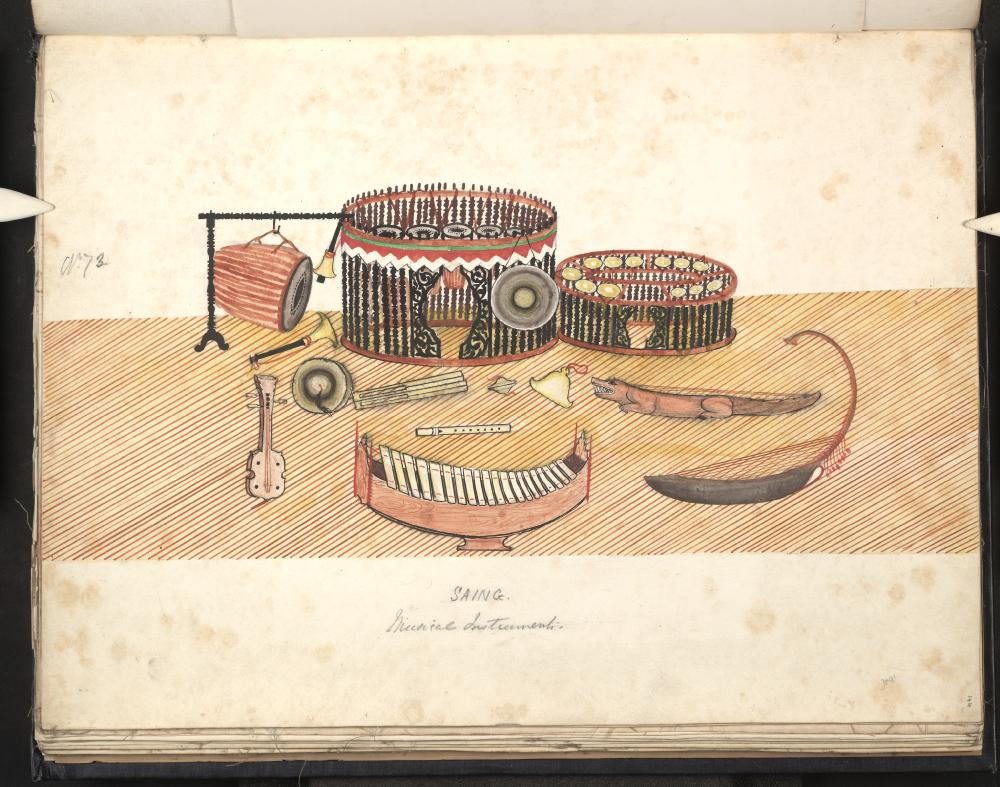
Musical instruments of 19th century Burma, depicted in a watercolour painting from the period

Beginning just before World War II, the piano was adapted to the performance of Burmese traditional music, modelling its technique after that of the pattala and saung. The best known performer of Burmese piano was Gita Lulin Maung Ko Ko, known as U Ko Ko (1928–2007).

The Burmese harp is of special significance. It dates back to the 9th century, though it has changed quite a bit since then, expanding, for example, from three strings to sixteen. During the Konbaung period (1752–1885), courtly musicians included Queen Ma Mya Galay, Princess Hlaing Hteikhaung Tin, Minister Myawaddy Mingyi U Sa, and King Nat Shin Naung of Taungoo.

Burmese musical instruments are traditionally classified into five classes, called pyissin turiya (ပဉ္စင်တူရိယာ):

1. Kyei (ကြေး) - brass instruments
2. Thayei (သားရေ) - leather-covered drums
3. Kyo (ကြိုး) - string instruments
4. Lei (လေ) - wind instruments
5. Letkhok (လက်ခုပ်) - percussion instruments

=== Tuning ===
These instruments are played in a musical scale consisting of seven tones, each associated with an animal that is said to be the producer of the tone. Each tone can be played raised, lowered or natural (corresponding to sharp, flat or natural), resulting in a possible twenty-one combinations. The pat waing drum circle, for example, consists of twenty-one drums, one tuned to each tone in each possible combination, and the saing saya (maestro) sits in the middle using various parts of his hands to strike the drums to produce a melody. The kyi waing is the gong circle strung up in the same fashion and the gongs are struck with a knobbed stick and in accompaniment to the pat waing.

Tone name	Burmese name	Animal	Approx. tone
Usabha (ဥသဘ)	Pyidawpyan (ပြည်တော်ပြန်)	bull	G
Dhevata (ဓေဝတ)	Chaukthwenyunt (ခြောက်သွယ်ညွန့်)	horse	D
Chajja (ဆဇ္စျ)	Duraka (ဒုရက)	peacock	A
Gandhāra (ဂန္ဓါရ)	Myinsaing (မြင်ဆိုင်း)	goat	E
Majjhima (မဇ္စျိမ)	Pale (ပုလဲ)	crane	B
Panzama (ပဉ္စမ)	Aukpyan (အောက်ပြန့်)	cuckoo	F
Nisāda (နိသာဒ)	Hnyinlon (ညွှင်းလုံး)	elephant	C

=== Kyay instruments ===
Kyay or brass instruments feature prominently in Burmese music. They include:

- Linkwin (လင်းကွင်း) - brass cymbals
- Kyay nin (ကြေးနင်း) - brass gong
- Kyay naung (ကြေးနောင်) - small brass gong
- Maung (မောင်း) - brass gong
- Kyay si (ကြေးစည်) - triangular gong
- Chu si (ခြူစည်) - jingle-like gong
- Kyauk si (ကျောက်စည်) - circular brass gong
- Maung saing (မောင်းဆိုင်း) - a graduated series of brass gongs
- Khaunglaung (ခေါင်းလောင်း) - brass bells
- Thanlwin (သံလွင်) - small brass cymbals
- Pha si (ဖားစည်) - bronze drums used in Mon, Karen, and Kayah music

=== Kyo instruments ===
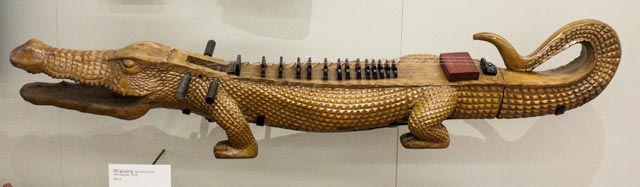
Mí-gyaùng (plucked zither) carved from wood in 2008. The instrument is used by the Mon people.

Kyo or string instruments in the Burmese musical repertoire include the following:

- Saung (စောင်း) - the traditional Burmese arched harp
- Mi gyaung (မိကျောင်) - plucked zither in Mon music
- Don min (ဒုံမင်း) - plucked zither

=== Thaye instruments ===
Thaye or leather instruments primarily consist of percussive-type drums used in folk ensembles, including:

- Ozi (အိုးစည်) - open-ended drum with a long body
- Dobat (ဒိုးပတ်) - short drum slung from the neck when played
- Byaw (ဗြော) - long drum
- Bongyi (ဗုံကြီး) - medium-sized long drum commonly used in folk music
- Bonto (ဗုံတို) - short drum
- Bonshay (ဗုံရှည်) - long drum carried with a rope round the neck
- Si (စခွန့်) - big drum
- Sito (စည်တို) - short drum
- Sakhun (စခွန့်) - double-headed drum on a stand
- Patwaing (ပတ်ဝိုင်း) - drum circle
- Chauklonpat (ခြောက်လုံးပတ်) - drum ensemble consisting of six graduated drums

=== Lei instruments ===
The lei or wind instruments include:

- Hne (နှဲ) - oboe
- Palwe (ပလွေ) - flute
- Khayu thin (နှဲ) - conch shell
- Bado (ပတိုး) - trumpet of an animal horn or conch shell
- Khaya (ခရာ) - trumpet-shaped wind instrument
- Nyin (ငြင်း)
- Phetleik (ဖက်လိပ်)

=== Letkhok instruments ===
The letkhok or percussion instruments are the least numerous, and include:

- Wa letkhok (ဝါးလက်ခုပ်) - bamboo clappers
- Ton wa - wooden gong or bamboo for timing and bamboo clappers

== See also ==
- Burmese dance
- Culture of Burma
- Myanmar National Symphony Orchestra
- K Ja Nu
