= Anade =

Burmese concept of restraint or embarrassment

Ana (Burmese: အားနာ, Burmese pronunciation: [ʔánà]) is a Burmese cultural and social value that has no direct English equivalent and is manifested by very strong inhibitions (hesitation, reluctance, restraint, or avoidance) against asserting oneself in human relations based on the fear that it will offend, embarrass or inconvenience someone, or cause someone to lose face. Ana also involves a strong sense of consideration for others' feelings and a desire not to cause them to feel psychological distress, unease, or burden. Ana significantly shapes interpersonal relationships and pervades everyday social interactions, as well as political and social behaviors in Burmese society.

Comparable values are found throughout Asian societies, including in Thailand, where it is called kreng jai (เกรงใจ) and in Japan, where it is called enryo (遠慮).

== Etymology ==
Ana literally means to have one's strength (အား) hurt (နာ). Ana-pana (အားနာ ပါးနာ) is synonymous to ana, with the suffix pana (ပါးနာ, lit. 'cheek hurts'). The term anade (အားနာတယ် lit. 'strength is hurt') is a sentence describing one's feeling of ana. The term ana has been borrowed into several regional languages, including into Shan as ဢႃးၼႃႇ and into Jingpho as ăna.

== Usage ==
Ana typically informs interactions with strangers, acquaintances, elders, social superiors and other respected persons, not with immediate family members and close friends. Ana is most commonly felt as self-restraint on self-assertiveness, requiring another's best interests to take priority over one's own interests. In fact, ana contributes to a strong sense of hierarchy and inequality within social relations, as frankness and directness is considered aggressive or confrontational behavior. The value involves an unwillingness to prevent others from feeling uncomfortable.

The feeling is also applied to situations when one wishes to behave in a certain manner but is restrained from doing so, for fear of causing the other party to feel angry, embarrassed or disappointed.

=== Elements ===
The major elements of ana include the following:

1. Sympathy, pity, empathy
2. Timidity in new social situations
3. Fear of distressing others
4. Desire to share or give
5. Inability to resist social pressure
6. Self-restraint
7. Respect to elders
8. Fear of offending others
9. Consideration for others
10. Prevention of aggression or confrontation
11. Giving or receiving hospitality
12. Shyness
13. Loss of face and shame
14. Response to suffering
15. Gratitude for favors or assistance
16. Etiquette, propriety
17. Observance of sex taboos
18. Failure to achieve
19. Sense of duty

== Examples ==
This social value is exemplified in many everyday situations, including the following examples:

- A person may hesitate to tell family members of his/her illness, for fear of causing them worry.
- A speaker may intentionally omit controversial points, to prevent an audience from taking offense.
- A guest may restrain himself from telling the host that he is hungry, for fear of burdening the host.
- A recipient may reject gift givers' presents, for fear of having burdened them.
- A parent may avoid asking his child to take him to the hospital, to display consideration.

== See also ==
- Face (sociological concept)
