= K Ja Nu =

K Ja Nu ကေဂျာနူး
- Genres: Burmese pop
- Occupation: singer
- Years active: mid-1970s to mid-1980s

K Ja Nu (Burmese: ကေဂျာနူး, pronounced [kè dʑà nú]; also spelt K Jar Nu) is a well-known Burmese pop singer in Burma (Myanmar) of Kachin descent; she was most popular in the 1970s to 1980s. She began her singing in church and dabbled in music while attending Rangoon University, performing on the Kachin portion of the English-speaking Local Talent radio broadcasts and singing movie soundtracks. She graduated with a bachelor's degree in history in 1970 and continued learning music from her father, a lifelong musician. However, she did not enter the entertainment industry until December 1973, after her father granted permission, debuting with the song "Lawka go alya laik eik me" (လောကကို အလျားလိုက်အိပ်မယ်). Among her biggest hits were "Our Shan Land's Festival" (တို့ရှမ်းပြည်ပွဲတော်), "Will You Buy Me Bogyoke Market?" (ဗိုလ်ချုပ်ဈေးကြီးဝယ်ပေးမလား), "Lets love just like friends" (သူငယ်ချင်းလိုပဲချစ်ကြတာပေါ့) and "Finding an Answer In Your Eyes" (မျက်ဝန်းလေးထဲမှာအဖြေရှာ). She currently resides in South Okkalapa Township in Yangon.
