= Culture of Myanmar =

The culture of Myanmar (Burma) (Burmese: မြန်မာ့ယဉ်ကျေးမှု, MLCTS: /mianma yinykye:hmu/ ) has been heavily influenced by Buddhism. Owing to its history, Burmese culture has significant influence over neighboring countries such as Laos, Siam, and in the Assam state of India, and Xishuangbanna region in China. It has also been influenced in various ways by its neighbours.

Since the fall of the Konbaung dynasty to the British in the Third Anglo-Burmese War, British colonial rule and westernisation have altered various aspects of Myanmar culture. Today, Myanmar's culture is characterized by the rich diversity of its ethnic groups, each contributing to a unique cultural identity, combined with its potent body of national characters that came into development over the millennia of monarchical history.

== Fine and applied arts ==
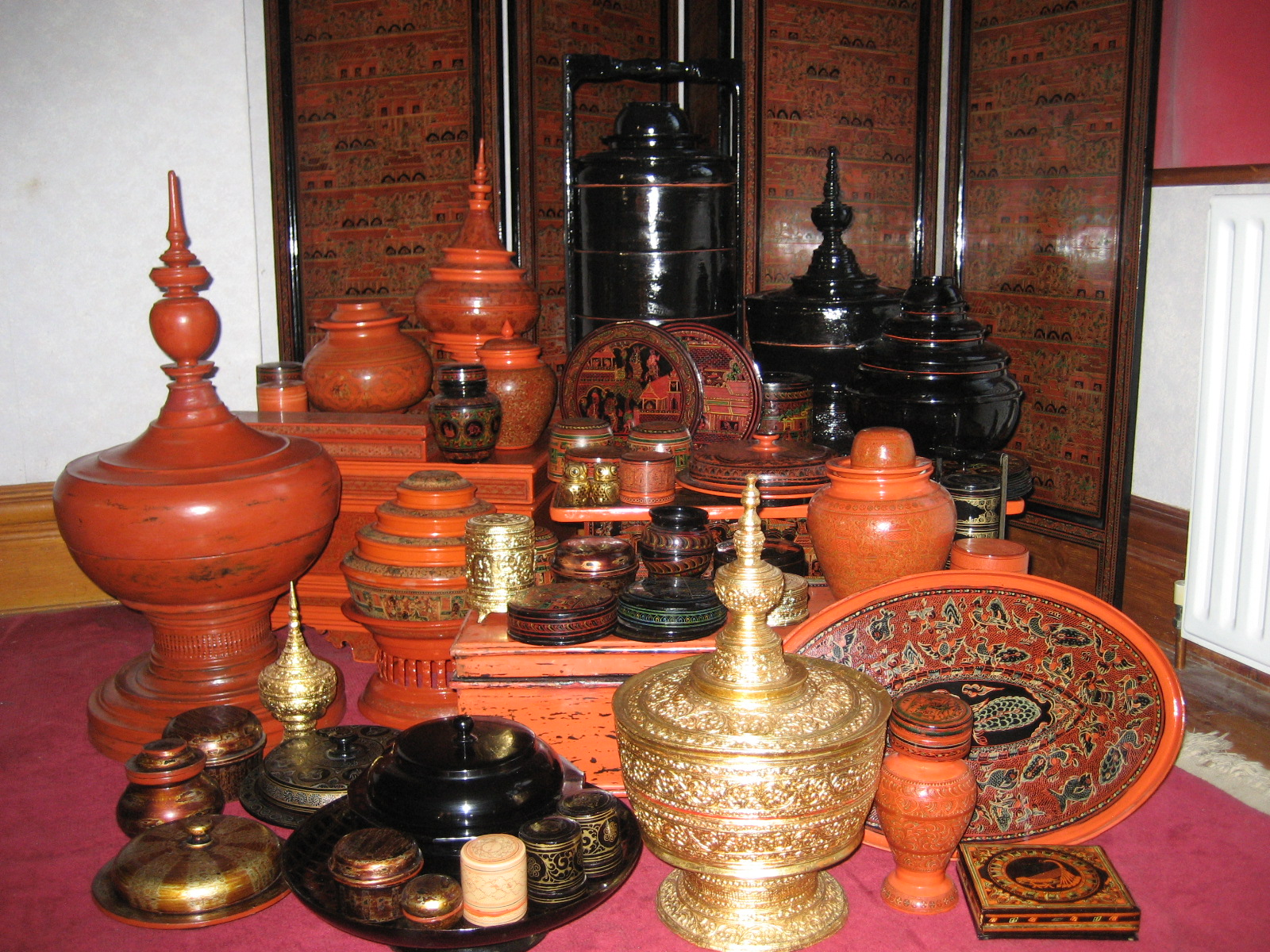
A wide range of Burmese lacquerware from Bagan

Historically, Myanmar art was based on Buddhist themes and was primarily patronized by royalty. Through different eras, it evolved through different styles and uses. There are also several regional styles of Buddha images, each with certain distinctive characteristics. For example, the Mandalay style, which developed in the late 1800s, features an oval-shaped Buddha image with realistic features, including naturally curved eyebrows, smaller but still prominent ears, and a draping robe. There are 10 traditional arts, called pan sè myo (ပန်းဆယ်မျိုး), listed as follows:

1. Blacksmith (ပန်းပဲ ba-bè)
2. Woodcarving (ပန်းပု ba-bu)
3. Goldsmith (ပန်းထိမ် ba-dein)
4. Stucco relief (ပန်းတော့ pandaw)
5. Masonry (ပန်းရန် pa-yan)
6. Stone carving (ပန်းတမော့ pantamaw)
7. Turnery (ပန်းပွတ် panbut)
8. Painting (ပန်းချီ bagyi)
9. Lacquerware (ပန်းယွန်း panyun)
10. Bronze casting (ပန်းတဉ်း badin)

In addition to the traditional arts are silk weaving, pottery, tapestry making, gemstone engraving, and gold leaf making. Temple architecture is typically of brick and stucco, and pagodas are often covered with layers of gold leaf while monasteries tend to be built of wood (although monasteries in cities are more likely to be built of modern materials). A very common roofing style in Burmese architecture is called pyatthat (ပြာသာဒ်), which is a many tiered and spired roof.

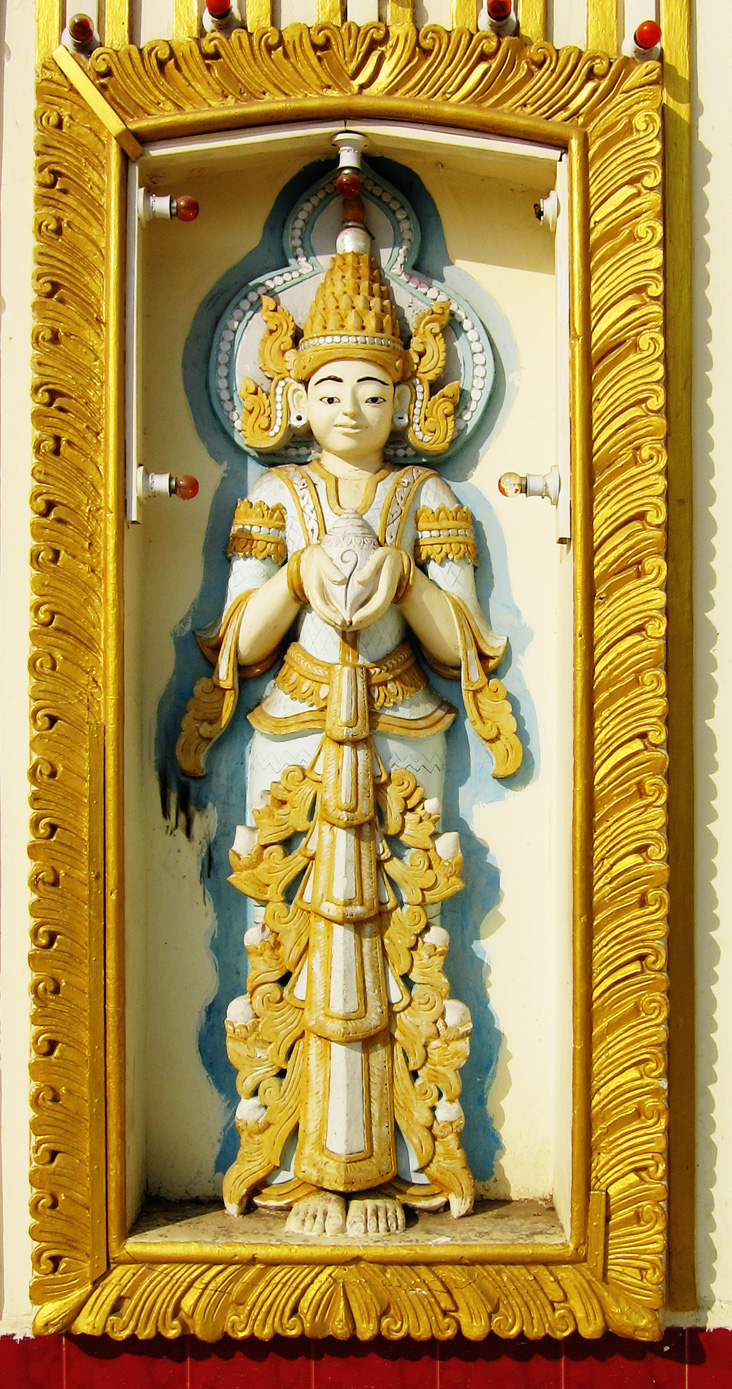
Sculpture of Thagyamin nat

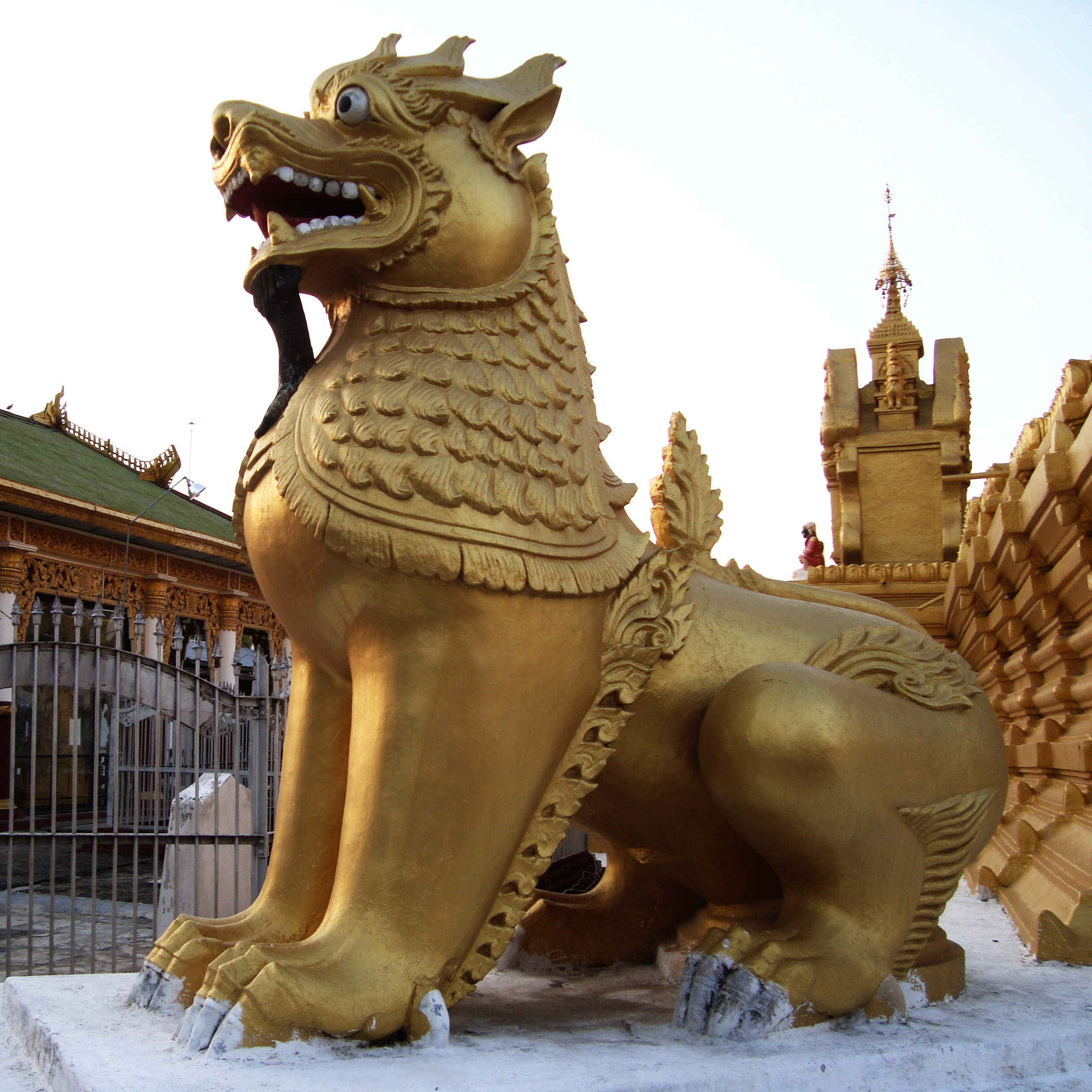
Sculpture of Myanmar mythical lion

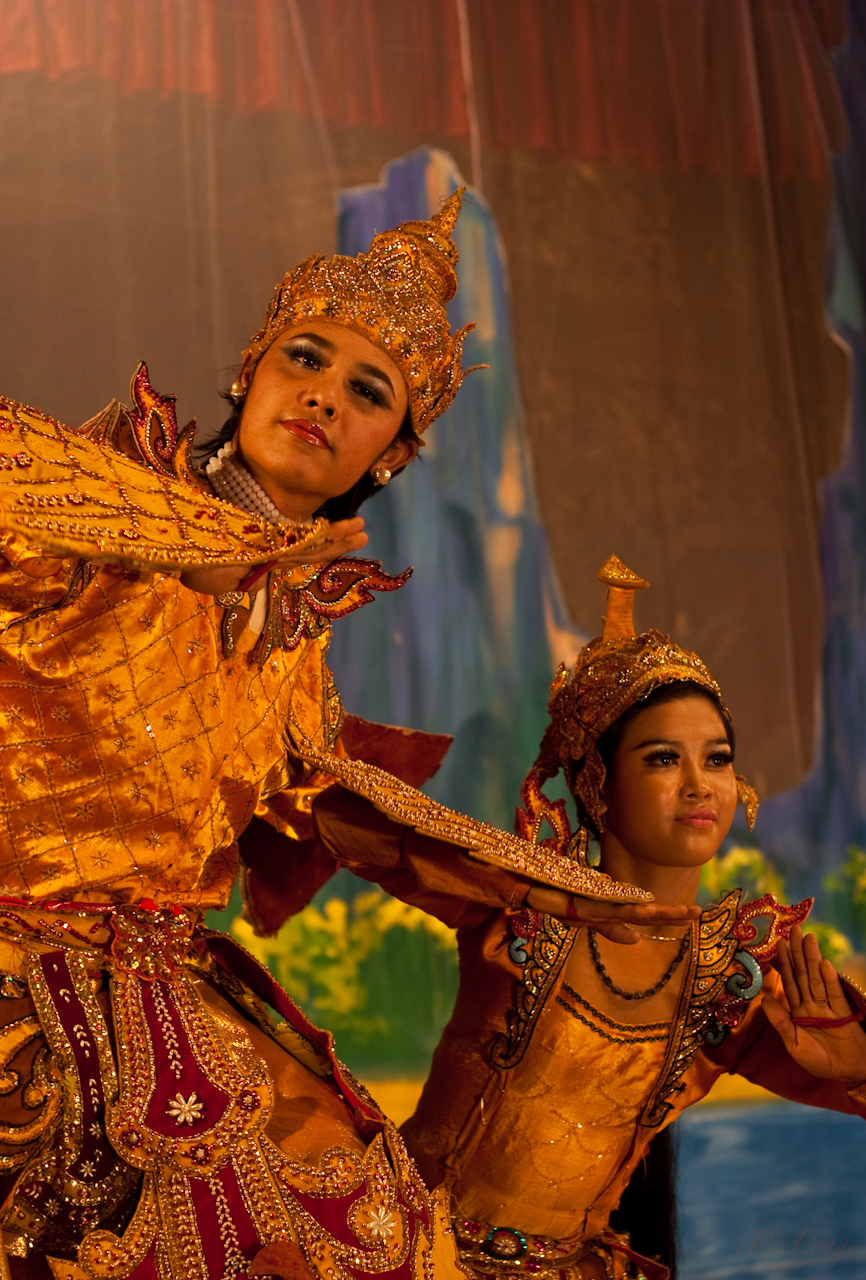
A theatrical performance of the Mon dance

== Literature ==
Burmese literature had been in existence for millennia, visibly since the Bagan period in the 11th century AD. Buddhism, notably the Jataka Tales, has greatly influenced Burmese literature. Many historical works are nonfiction. Poetry features prominently, and there are several forms of poetry unique to Burmese literature. However, British colonization introduced many genres of fiction, which have become extremely popular today.

By 1976, only 411 titles were published annually, compared to 1882, when 445 titles were published. Various factors, especially the lengthened bureaucratic process to obtain printing permits, censorship, and increasing economic hardship of consumers because of the socialist economic schemes, contributed to the decline of Burmese literary output.

Popular novels have similar themes to Western novels, often involving adventure, espionage, detective work, and romance. Many writers also translate Western novels, especially those of Arthur Hailey and Harold Robbins. The flourishing translation sector is the result of the Burmese government, which did not sign the Universal Copyright Convention Agreement, which would have forced Burmese writers to pay royalties to the original writers.

Short stories, often published in magazines, also enjoy tremendous popularity. They often deal with everyday life and have political messages (such as subtle criticisms of the capitalist system), partly because, unlike novels, short stories are not censored by the Press Scrutiny Board. Poetry is also a popular genre today, as it was during the monarchical times. However, unlike novels and other works, which use literary Burmese, poetry uses vernacular rather than literary Burmese. This reform movement is led by left-leaning writers who believe laymen's language (the vernacular and colloquial form of Burmese) should be used instead of formal Burmese in literature.

One of the greatest female writers of the Post-colonial period is Journal Kyaw Ma Ma Lay. Khin Myo Chit was another important writer who wrote, among her works, The 13-Carat Diamond (1955), which was translated into many languages. The journalist Ludu U Hla was the author of numerous volumes of ethnic minority folklore, novels about inmates in U Nu-era jails, and biographies of people working in different occupations. Prime Minister U Nu himself wrote several politically oriented plays and novels.

Other prolific writers of the post-colonial era include Thein Phae Myint (and his The Ocean Traveller and the Pearl Queen, considered a Burmese classic), Mya Than Tint (known for his translations of Western classics like War and Peace), Thawda Swe and Myat Htun. Distinguished women writers, who have also been an ever-present force in Burmese literary history, include Kyi Aye, Khin Hnin Yu, and San San Nweh. Burmese Historians: Ba Shin, Than Tun, Thant Myint-U, Htin Aung, Sao Saimong, Myoma Myint Kywe, and San C. Po were famous in Burma.

== Dance ==
In the Mintha Theater (Mandalay) a master teacher of the Inwa School of Performing Arts demonstrates traditional hand movements.

Dance in Burma can be divided into court, drama(Anyeint and Zett), folk and nat dances, each having distinct characteristics. Like many arts in Burma, Burmese dance is infused with different dance traditions. Mandalay dance school would have different nuances from other dance schools, such as those of Yangon. In addition to its own styles, (yodaya aka), is also popular in Myanmar. Yodaya is the name that was given by the Burmese for Thailand. The yodaya dance is the only dance with yodaya for entertaining the royal families at the royal court. It retains unique qualities that distinguish it from other regional styles, including angular, fast-paced and energetic movements and emphasis on pose, not movement.

== Music ==
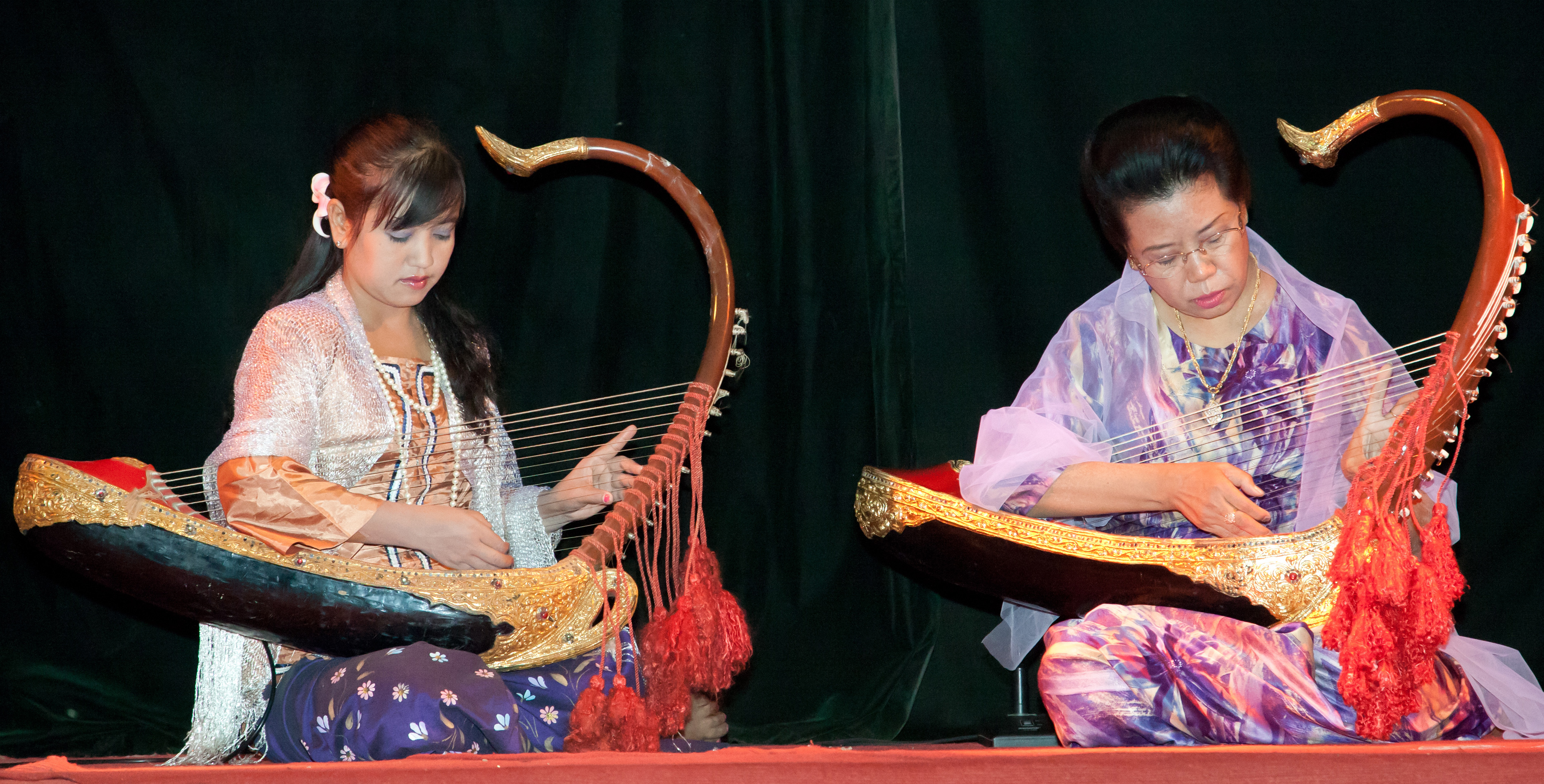
Two female musicians play the saung at a performance in Mandalay.

Various types of Burmese music use an array of traditional musical instruments, assembled in an orchestra known as hsaing waing which the Burmese saing saya Kyaw Kyaw Naing has made more widely known in the West. Burmese traditional music is atypical in Southeast Asian music, as it is characterised by sudden shifts in rhythm and melody as well as changes in texture and timbre. It employs different ways and occasions of playing music in Myanmar. Historically, the Hsaing-wine is played for the auspicious ceremonies and royal presence. Byaw is well familiar to the village environments. Different forms of music are accompanied by different kinds of instruments. An instrument unique to Burma is the saung-gauk, an arched harp that can be traced to pre-Hittite times.

Classical traditions of Burmese music are found in the Mahagita, an extensive collection of classical songs and are typically divided into indoor and outdoor ensembles. These songs tend to be about various legends in Pali and subsequently in Burmese intermingled with Pali, related to religion or the power and glory of monarchs, and then the natural beauty of the land, forests and the seasons, eventually feminine beauty, love, passion and longing, in addition to folk music sung in the paddy fields. Pop music, both adopted and homegrown, however, dominates the music of Burma today.

== Customs ==
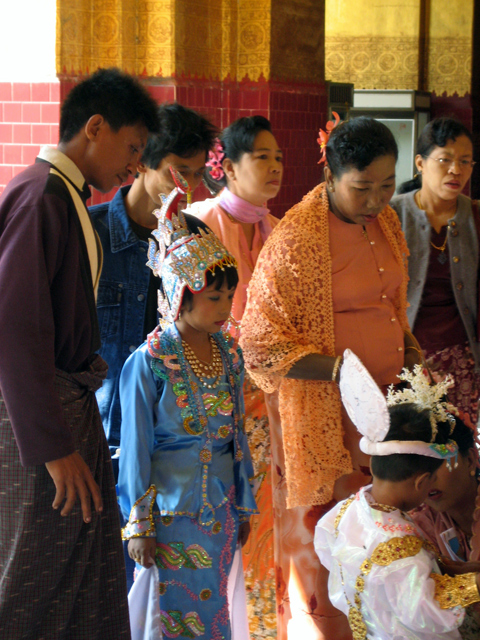
An ear-piercing ceremony at Mahamuni Buddha in Mandalay

The "traditional" Burmese greeting is mingalaba (မင်္ဂလာပါ, from Pali maṅgala and roughly translated as 'auspiciousness to you'). This is, however, a comparatively recent form of greeting, first emerging during British rule in Burma during the 19th to 20th centuries, coined as a Burmese language equivalent to 'hello' or 'how are you.' More informal rhetorical greetings such as "Have you eaten?" (ထမင်းစားပြီးပြီလား Htamin sa pi bi la) and "How are you?" (နေကောင်းလား Nei kaung la) are still common. "Hello" is also a popular greeting nowadays, whereas it used to be confined to answering the phone.People in Myanmar usually say (တွေ့ရတာဝမ်းသာပါတယ် Twae ya tar wan thar par dal) to tell them it was nice meeting you.

=== Clothing ===
The typical garment of the Burmese is the lungi or longyi, a long garment worn by both men and women. For business and formal occasions, Bamar men wear a Teik-pon shirt (တိုက်ပုံအင်္ကျီ) over an English collar shirt (sometimes donning a headwear called gaung baung), while Bamar women wear a blouse buttoned at the front, called yinzi (ရင်စေ့) or to the side, called yinbon (ရင်ဖုံး), and a shawl. In urban areas, skirts and pants are becoming more common, particularly among the young.

During the British colonial era, Burmese nationalists associated traditional clothing, in particular Yaw longyi (ယောလုံချည်), a type of longyi from the Yaw region, and pinni taikpon (ပင်နီတိုက်ပုံအင်္ကျီ), a fawn-coloured collarless jacket, with anti-colonialism and nationalist sentiment, because of a clampdown in the 1920s over increasing dissent. Wearing "traditional" clothing was seen as a mode of passive resistance to the cultural infiltration among the Burmese. British rule nonetheless influenced hair fashion and clothing. Cropped short hair, called bo ke (ဗိုလ်ကေ) replaced long hair as the norm among Burmese men.

Similarly, women began wearing hairstyles like amauk (အမောက်), consisting of crested bangs curled at the top, with the traditional hair bun (ဆံထုံး). The female sarong (htamein) became shorter, no longer extending to the feet, but to the ankles, and the length of the sarong's top decreased to reveal more waistline. This period also saw the introduction of a sheer muslin blouse for women, revealing a corset-like lace bodice called za bawli (ဇာဘော်လီ).

=== Speech ===
The Burmese language is very age-oriented. The use of honorifics before personal names is the norm, and it is considered rude to call a person just by their name without the honorific unless they are known from childhood or youth or in the case of a younger underling. Young males are addressed as Maung or Ko (lit. brother), and older or senior men as U (lit. uncle). Likewise, young females are addressed as Ma (lit. sister), and older or senior women as Daw (lit. aunt), regardless of their marital status. 'Aunty' or 'Uncle' is commonly used as well today. The first and second person pronouns vary depending on whom one is speaking to and are age-dependent. Elders are spoken to in a more respectful manner and a special vocabulary exists for speaking to Buddhist monks.

=== Manners ===
Burmese society operates on ana (အားနာမှု), a characteristic or feeling that has no English equivalent. It is characterised by a hesitation, reluctance, or avoidance to perform an action based on the fear that it will offend someone or cause someone to lose face or become embarrassed. Also, there is the concept of hpon (ဘုန်း; from Sanskrit bhaga), which translates to "power". It is used as an explanation for the varying degrees of ethnic, socioeconomic, and gender differences between people in a society. Hpone refers to the cumulative result of past deeds, an idea that power or social position comes from merit earned in previous lives. This idea is used to justify the prevalent view that women are lesser than men, who are considered to have more hpon.

Age is still considered synonymous with experience and wisdom, hence venerated. Parents and teachers are second only to the Three Jewels (ရတနာသုံးပါး yadana thoun ba), together making up the Five Boundless Beneficence (အနန္တငါးပါး ananda nga ba), and are paid obeisance (called gadaw) at special times of the year such as Thingyan, beginning and end of Buddhist Lent, and usually parents before one leaves on a journey. Elders are served first at meals, and in their absence, a spoonful of rice is put aside first in the pot as a token of respect (ဦးချ u cha) before serving the meal. Young people would avoid sitting on a higher level than the elders or passing in front of them unless unavoidable, and then only treading softly with a slight bow. Things would be passed to the elders using both hands together. Men may cross their legs sitting on a chair or a mat, but women generally would not.

Children are taught from young to venerate one's elders, to respect one's peers, and to be kind to the young and weak' (ကြီးသူကိုရိုသေ၊ ရွယ်သူကိုလေးစား၊ ငယ်သူကိုသနား။ kyeethu go yothei, ywedu go layza, ngethu go thana). Parents are believed to be solely responsible for their children's behaviour as reflected by the expressions: mi ma hsonma, hpa ma hsonma (မိမဆုံးမ ဖမဆုံးမ undisciplined either by mother or by father) and ami youk tau hnoukkyan, ahpa youk tau ko amu-aya kyan (bad language from bad mother, bad body-language from bad father). Saying "thank you" however, is not a Burmese custom between friends and within the family.

It is considered rude to touch a person's head, because it is the "highest" point of the body. It is also considered taboo to touch another's feet, but worse still to point with the foot or sit with feet pointing at someone older, because the feet are considered the lowest. Also, pointing a finger at Buddha images is considered blasphemous, although this custom has slowly eroded. Shoes are always taken off upon entering homes, monasteries and pagoda compounds. A custom of the Burmese is to perambulate clockwise (လက်ယာရစ် let ya yit) around a pagoda, not counterclockwise (လက်ဝဲရစ် let wè yit).

Physical demonstrations of affection in public are common between friends of the same gender or between members of the family, but are seldom seen between lovers. It is thus common to see friends walking together holding hands or with arms around each other, but couples rarely do so, except in major cities.

=== Footwear ===
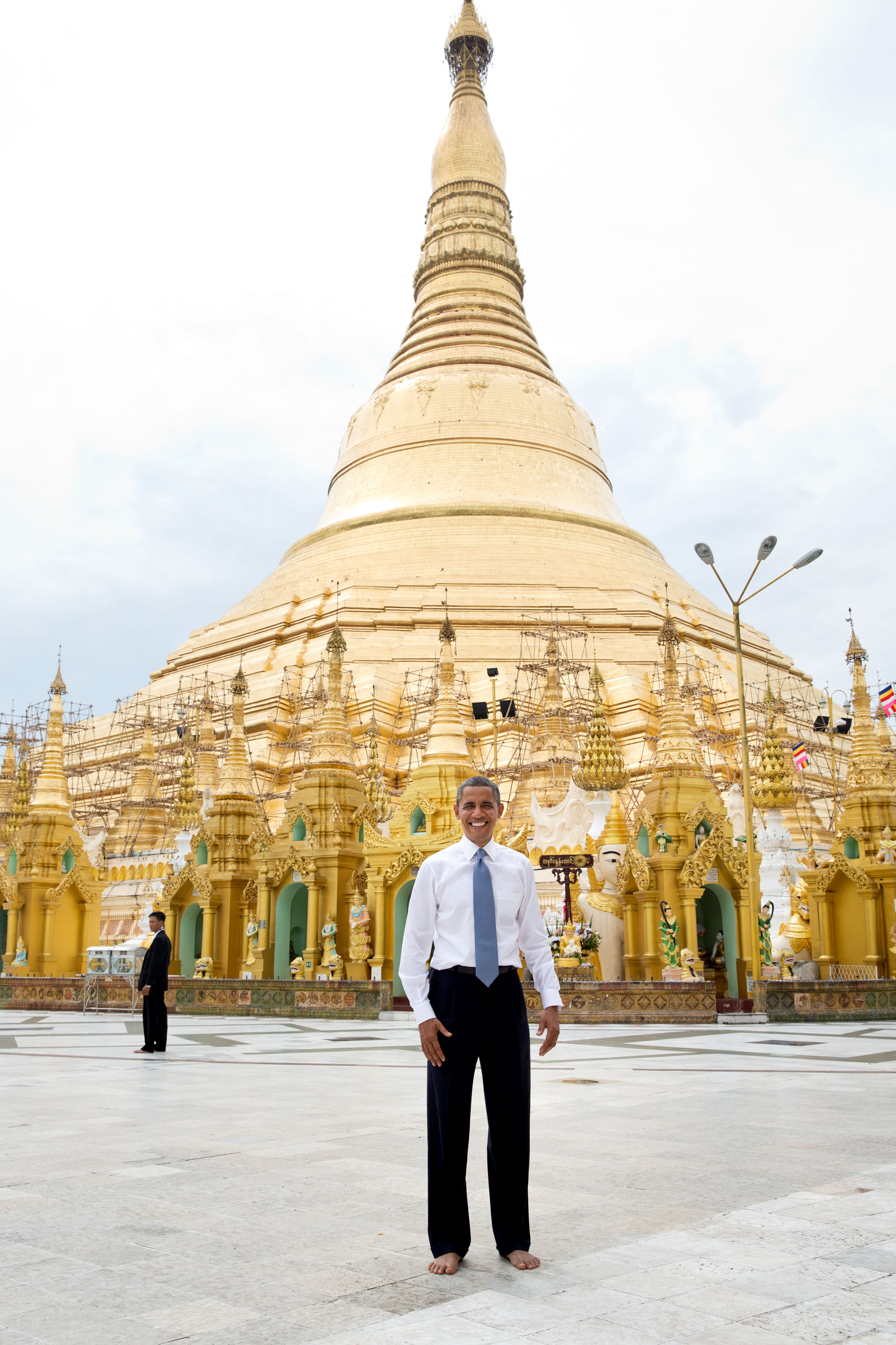
Former US President Barack Obama poses barefoot on the grounds of Shwedagon Pagoda, one of Myanmar's major Buddhist pilgrimage sites.

In Myanmar, footwear is customarily removed before entering a home and Buddhist places of worship. Many workplaces in Myanmar also have shoe-free areas, or restrict footwear altogether, with shoes typically left at the corridor or at the entrance of an office.

These customs are strictly enforced in Buddhist places of worship, including Burmese pagodas and in Buddhist monasteries called kyaung. The Burmese remove their footwear at such sites as a sign of religious respect.

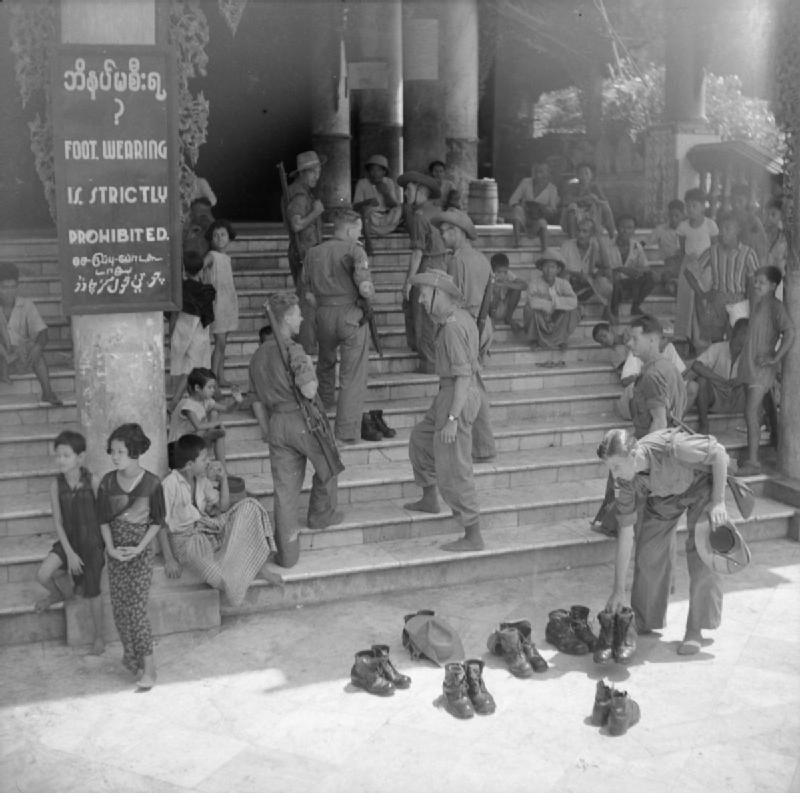
British soldiers remove their shoes at the entrance of Shwedagon Pagoda. To the left, a sign reads "Foot wearing is strictly prohibited" in Burmese, English, Tamil, and Urdu.

Strict enforcement of this custom, however, is partly a legacy of British rule in Burma, during which Europeans refused and were exempted from removing their footwear when entering Buddhist places of worship. In pre-colonial Burma, non-royals removed their footwear before entering palace grounds, as a token of respect for the reigning monarch. In the final years of the Konbaung dynasty, diplomatic relations between the British and Burmese soured when the British Resident, a colonial representative, refused to remove his shoes upon entering the raised platform of the Mandalay Palace, a decision that prevented him from meeting King Thibaw Min. Consequently, the British withdrew the Resident and his delegation in October 1879, with his exit portending the Third Anglo-Burmese War, after which the remaining half of the Burmese kingdom (Upper Burma) was fully annexed into British India.

This "shoe question" became a rallying cry for Burmese nationalists, comparable to the cow protection movement in neighboring British India. In 1916, the nationalist Young Men's Buddhist Association (YMBA) began campaigning against foreigners wearing shoes in pagoda grounds, with Buddhist monks at the forefront of the campaign. The Ledi Sayadaw, a prominent Buddhist monk, penned On the Impropriety of Wearing Shoes on Pagoda Platforms, which drew in widespread support for the YMBA's activism.

In 1919, after a two-year battle, Cambridge-educated barrister Thein Maung, a YMBA member, successfully persuaded the colonial government to issue an order prohibiting footwear on the grounds of religious sites. Thein Maung's undertaking was in direct response to the actions of Archibald Cochrane, future Governor of Burma, who had kept his shoes on while touring Shwemawdaw Pagoda in Pegu (now Bago) in 1917, much to the indignation of locals.

In recent years, foreigners have been successfully prosecuted and punished for refusing to remove their footwear at Burmese religious sites. In August 2017, a Russian tourist was arrested and sentenced to seven months of jail time and hard labor for repeatedly refusing to remove her shoes upon entering pagoda grounds throughout Bagan, as she had violated local customs, per Section 13(1) of the Immigration Act. Burmese authorities subsequently announced a crackdown tourists wearing shoes inside Bagan's pagodas.

== Cuisine ==
Burmese cuisine has been influenced by Indian, Chinese and Thai cuisines as well as domestic ethnic cuisines. It is not widely known throughout the world and can be characterised as having a mildly spicy taste, with a limited use of spices. A typical Burmese meal consists of several Burmese curries, a soup, steamed rice, and fermented sauce of preserved fish, along with vegetables for dipping. Condiments like balachaung, Indian-style pickles and pickled vegetables are commonly served alongside the dishes. Although fish sauce and shrimp paste are commonly used ingredients, as in other Southeast Asian cuisines, Burmese cuisine also makes extensive use of chickpeas, lentils and tamarind, which is used to add a sour flavour rather than the lime juice or vinegar used in other cuisines.

Ethnic cuisines, in particular Shan cuisine, are also prominently found throughout Burma, as are Indian and Chinese dishes, particularly in urban areas. The de facto national dish is mohinga (မုန့်ဟင်းခါး), rice noodles in a rich fish soup. Burmese salads (အသုပ်), especially laphet thoke, which is a salad of pickled tea leaves, are also popular dishes. The Burmese traditionally eat with their fingers, although the usage of Western utensils and chopsticks has become more widespread, especially in towns and cities. Indian breads like paratha and naan or rice noodles are also commonly eaten with dishes, in addition to rice.

== Weddings ==
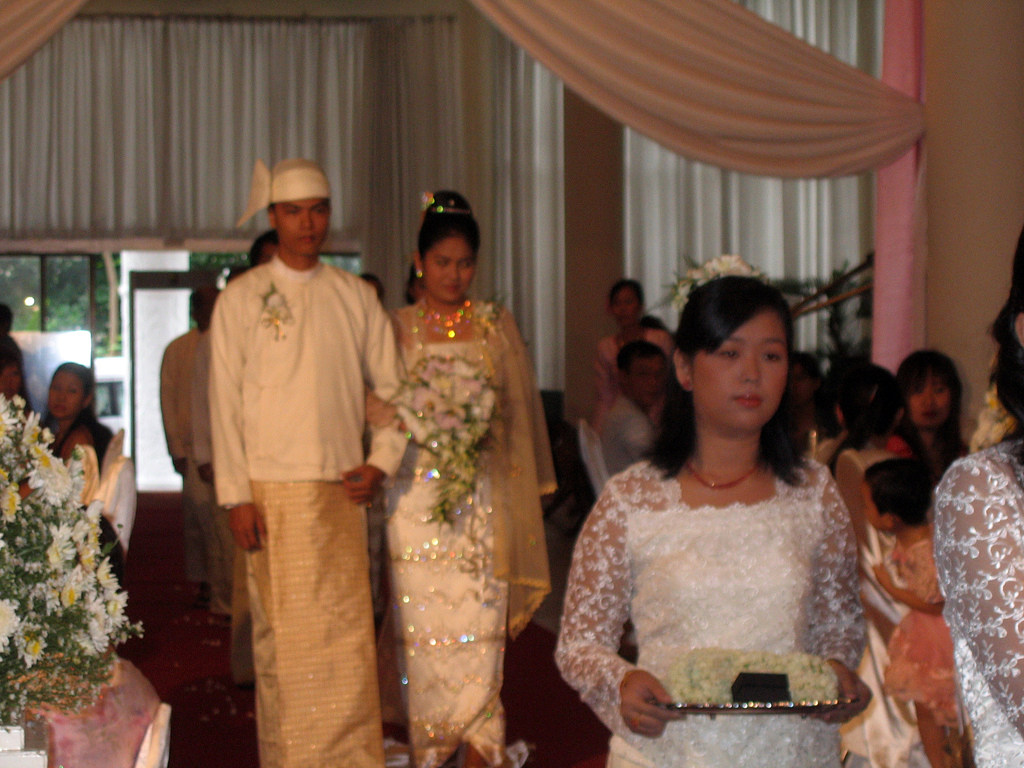
A wedding procession, with the groom and bride dressed in traditional Burmese wedding clothes, reminiscent of royal attire

Weddings are considered one of the Twelve Auspicious Rites in Burmese culture. Traditional Burmese folklore considers love to be destiny, as the Hindu god Brahma writes one's destiny in love on a child's brow when he or she is six days old, called na hpuza (နဖူးစာ, lit. "destiny on the forehead"). A Burmese wedding can be religious or secular and extravagant or simple. Traditionally, a marriage is recognised with or without a ceremony when the man's longyi (sarong) is seen hanging from a rail of the house or if the couple eats from the same plate. Dowries are typically unheard of, and arranged marriage is not a custom of the common Burmese.

Weddings are traditionally avoided during the Buddhist lent, which lasts three months from July to October.

Generally speaking, Buddhist monks are not present to conduct the wedding and solemnise the marriage, as they are forbidden to officiate a marriage, which is considered a worldly affair (lokiya). However, they may be invited to bless the newly wed couple and recite a protective paritta. Typically, the bride and groom arrange an almsgiving feast to monks the morning of the wedding to gain merit.

A more extravagant wedding requires months of preparation, including consultation with an astrologer in choosing the most auspicious time and setting of the event. Also, a master of ceremonies, typically a brahmin, is hired to preside over the ceremony. The bride and groom sit on cushions next to each other. At the beginning of the wedding, the Brahmin blows a conch shell to commence the ceremony and joins the palms of the couple, wraps them in white cloth, and dips the joined palms in a silver bowl. The Burmese word "to marry" is let htat (လက်ထပ်), which literally means "to join palms together". After chanting a few Sanskrit mantras, the Brahmin takes the couple's joined palms out of the bowl and blows the conch shell to end the ceremony. Afterward, entertainers perform, and the wedding is ended with a speech by a guest of higher social standing. Wedding receptions at a hotel, serving tea and ice cream, are common in urban areas.

== Funerals ==
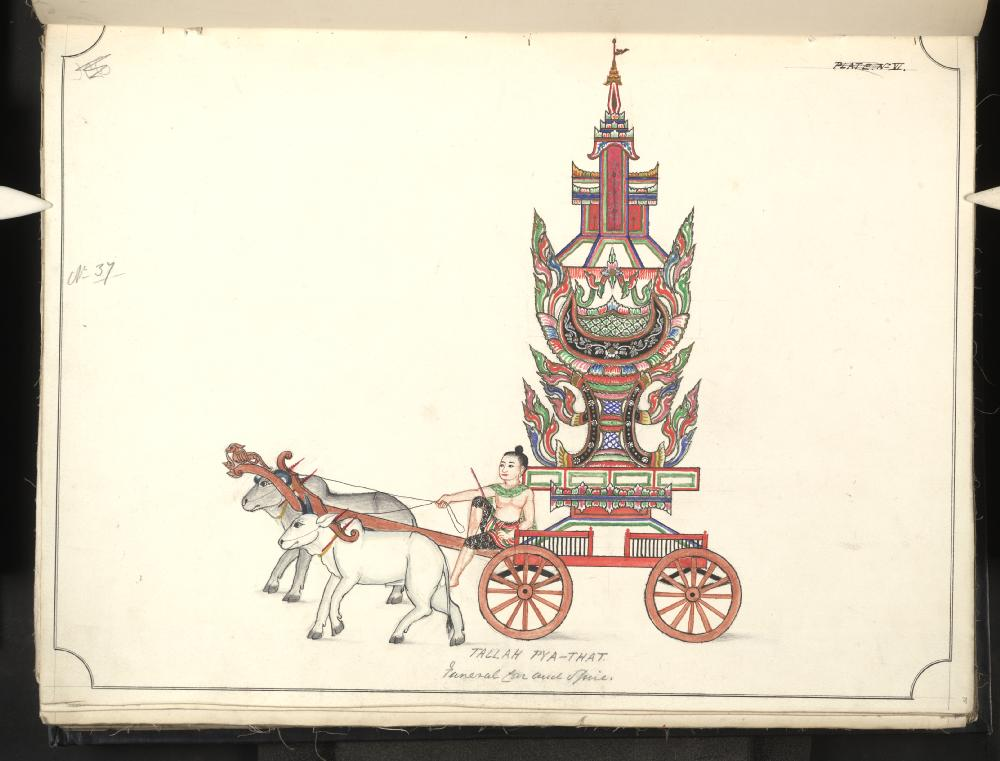
19th-century funeral cart and spire, which would form part of the procession from the home to the place of cremation

Burmese funerals typically last a week, with the body traditionally buried or cremated on the third day. Burial is common, but cremation, more common in the cities, is also practised by orthodox Buddhists and monks in Burma. A coin, called kudoga (ကူးတို့ခ) is placed in the mouth of the deceased person, to pay a "ferry toll" for crossing death. Before the actual interment of the body, an offering of turmeric-coated rice is given to appease the bhummazo (ဘုမ္မစိုး), the guardian deity of the earth. During the actual funeral, gifts in the form of paper fans containing the deceased person's name, as well as Buddhist scriptures relating to the impermanence of life (anicca) and samsara are distributed to all attendees.

In urban areas, flower wreaths and florals are typically given at a funeral, as well as money, for less well-to-do families. However, in villages, more practical gifts such as food items are given to the grieving family. For seven days, the windows and doors of the house in which the person died may be left open, to let the deceased person's consciousness or "spirit", called leippya (လိပ်ပြာ, lit. 'butterfly') leave the home, and a vigil may be kept at nighttime. On the seventh day, called yet le (ရက်လည်), a meal is offered to monks, who in turn recite blessings, protective parittas and transfer merit to the deceased, concluded with a Buddhist water libation ceremony.

== Religion ==
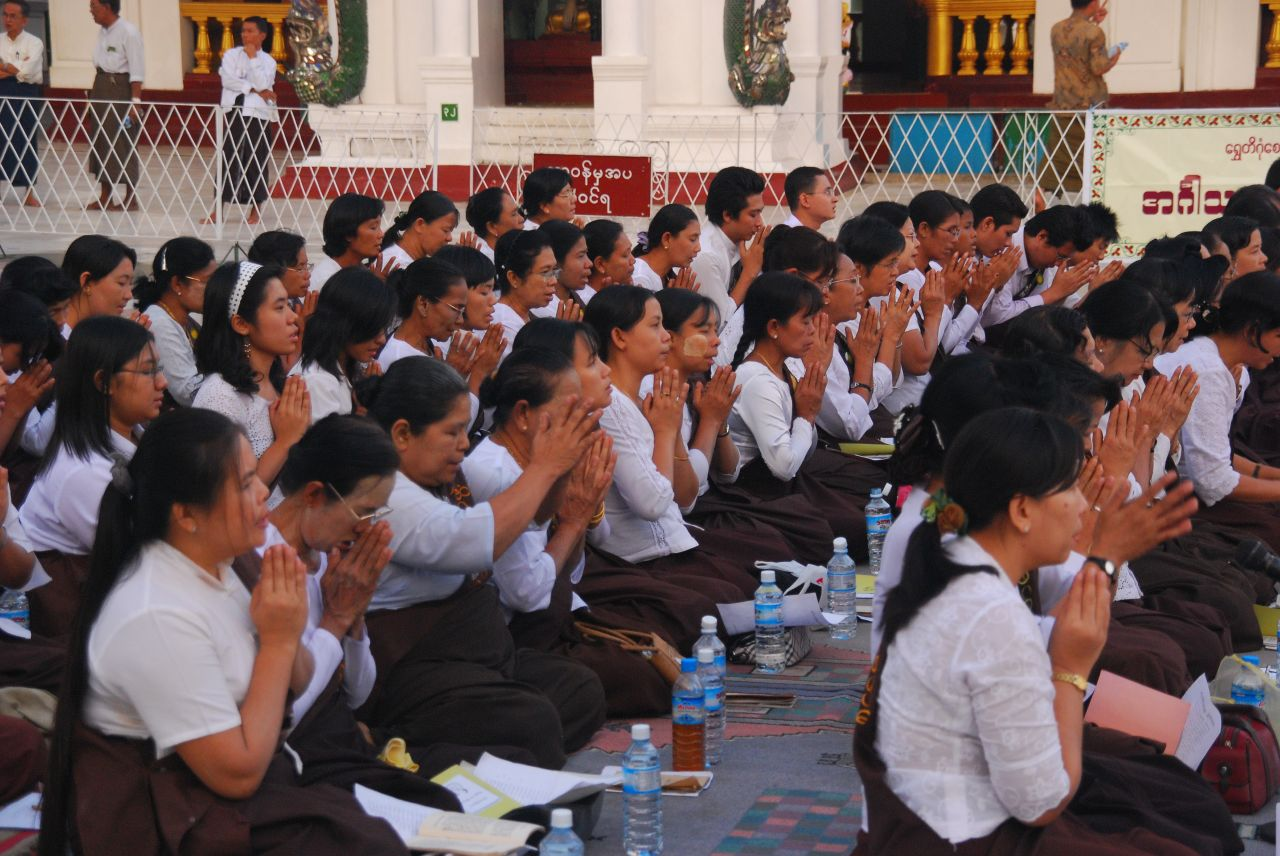
A group of Buddhist worshipers at Shwedagon Pagoda, an important religious site for Burmese Buddhists

Religion in Myanmar
religion	percent
Buddhism	91.3%
Christianity	4.6%
Islam	3.3%
Hinduism	.6%
Others	.2%

Myanmar is a predominantly Theravada Buddhist country. Buddhism reached Burma around the beginning of the Christian era, mingling with the indigenous form of Hinduism. The Pyu and Mon kingdoms of the first millennium were Hindu-Buddhist. According to traditional history, King Anawrahta of Bagan adopted Buddhism in 1056 and went to war with the Mon kingdom of Thaton in the south of the country to obtain the Buddhist Canon and learned monks. The religious tradition created at this time, and which continues to the present day, is a syncretic mix of what might be termed 'pure' Buddhism (of the Theravada school) with deep-rooted elements of the original Hindu-animist culture or nat worship and even strands of Hinduism and the Mahayana tradition of northern India.

Islam reached Burma at approximately the same time, but never gained a foothold outside the geographically isolated seaboard running from modern-day Bangladesh southward to Irrawaddy Delta (modern Rakhine State, formerly Arakan, an independent kingdom until the eighteenth century). The colonial period saw a huge influx of Muslim Indians into Yangon and other cities, and the majority of Yangon's many mosques owe their origins to these immigrants.

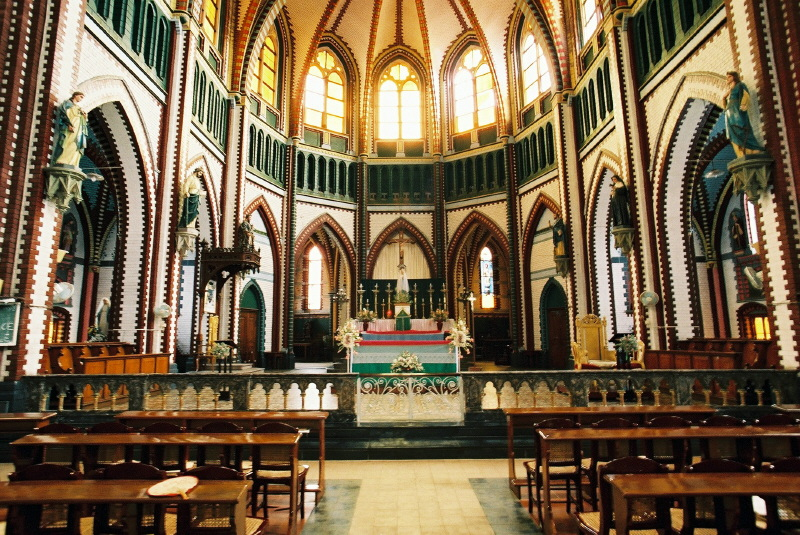
Saint Mary's Cathedral in Downtown Yangon is the largest Roman Catholic cathedral in Burma.

Christianity was brought to Burma by European missionaries in the 1800s. It made little headway among Buddhists, but has been widely adopted by non-Buddhists such as the Chin, Karen, and Kachin. The Roman Catholic Church, Myanmar Baptist Convention and the Assemblies of God of Burma are the largest Christian denominations in Burma. Burma is home to the third-largest population of Baptists in the world, after India and the United States, the result of American missionary work.

The Chinese contribution to Burma's religious mix has been slight, but several traditional Chinese temples were established in Yangon and other large cities in the nineteenth century when large-scale Chinese migration was encouraged by the British. Since approximately 1990, this migration has resumed in huge numbers, but the modern Chinese immigrants seem to have little interest in religion. Some more isolated indigenous peoples in the more inaccessible parts of the country still follow traditional animism.

Burma has nominal guarantees of freedom of religious expression, although religious minorities (Christians and Muslims), particularly those in the countryside, are subject to discrimination. Sporadic riots between Burmese Buddhists and Burmese Muslims are not uncommon, and tensions between the two religious groups are high, particularly in major cities. In 2001, after the Taliban's destruction of the Buddhas of Bamiyan in Afghanistan, religiously motivated riots broke out between Buddhists and Muslims across major cities in Burma, including Sittwe, Pyay, Taungoo and Bago. The current regime's nationalistic policy of Bama san-gyin, which considers Buddhism a key element of Burmese-ness, does provide a systemic bias in favour of Buddhists in terms of preferment in the armed forces and other State structures.

=== Pagodas and monasteries ===
Aspects of Burmese culture are most apparent at religious sites. The country has been called the "Land of Pagodas" as the landscape is dominated by Buddhist pagodas or stupas. The four most important Burmese Buddhist pilgrimage sites are Shwedagon Pagoda in Yangon, Mahamuni Buddha in Mandalay, Kyaiktiyo Pagoda in Mon State, and Bagan, an ancient capital by the Ayeyarwady River where thousands of stupas and temples have stood for nearly a millennium in various states of repair.

Pagodas are known by their Pali terms zedi (စေတီ) or pahto (ပုထိုး), but are also commonly called hpaya (ဘုရား) which is synonymous with "Buddha". Monasteries are known as hpongyi kyaung (ဘုန်းကြီးကျောင်း), hpongyi meaning monk, and since they have traditionally been places of learning where village children are taught how to read and write including and more importantly Pali, the language of the Buddhist scriptures, school also came to be called kyaung (ကျောင်း) in the Burmese language.

== Traditional festivals ==
There are twelve months in the traditional Burmese calendar and twelve corresponding festivals. Most of the festivals are related to Burmese Buddhism and in any town or village the local paya pwè (the pagoda festival) is the most important one.

The most well-known festival is Thingyan, a four-day celebration of the coming Lunar New Year. This festival is held prior to the Burmese New Year, the first day of Tagu which falls in mid-April. It is related and similar to other Southeast Asian New Year festivals (Songkran, Cambodian New Year, Sinhalese New Year and Lao New Year), people splash water on one another. However, Thingyan has religious significance, marking the days in which Buddhists are expected to observe the Eight Precepts of Buddhism.

== Sports ==
=== Football ===
Football is the most popular sport in Myanmar. Similar to football, chinlone (Burmese: ခြင်းလုံး) is an indigenous sport that utilises a rattan ball and is played using mainly the feet and the knees, but the head and also the arms may be used except the hands.

=== Lethwei ===
Lethwei (Burmese: လက်ဝှေ့; IPA: [lɛʔ.ʍḛ]), or Burmese bareknuckle boxing, is the most popular combat sport in Myanmar. It is a Burmese full-contact martial art called thaing, divided into bando (unarmed combat) and banshay (armed combat).

=== Regatta ===
Of the twelve seasonal festivals, regattas are held in the month of Tawthalin (August/September). The term typically describes racing events of rowed or sailed watercraft.

=== Equestrian ===
Equestrian events were held by the royal army in the time of the Burmese kings in the month of Pyatho (December/January).

=== Cricket ===
During British rule, the game of cricket was played by the ruling British, with the Burma national cricket team playing a number of first-class matches. The team exists today, although no longer of first-class quality and is an affiliate member of the International Cricket Council.

=== Basketball ===
Burma also has a basketball team, which qualified for the Asian Games in the past.

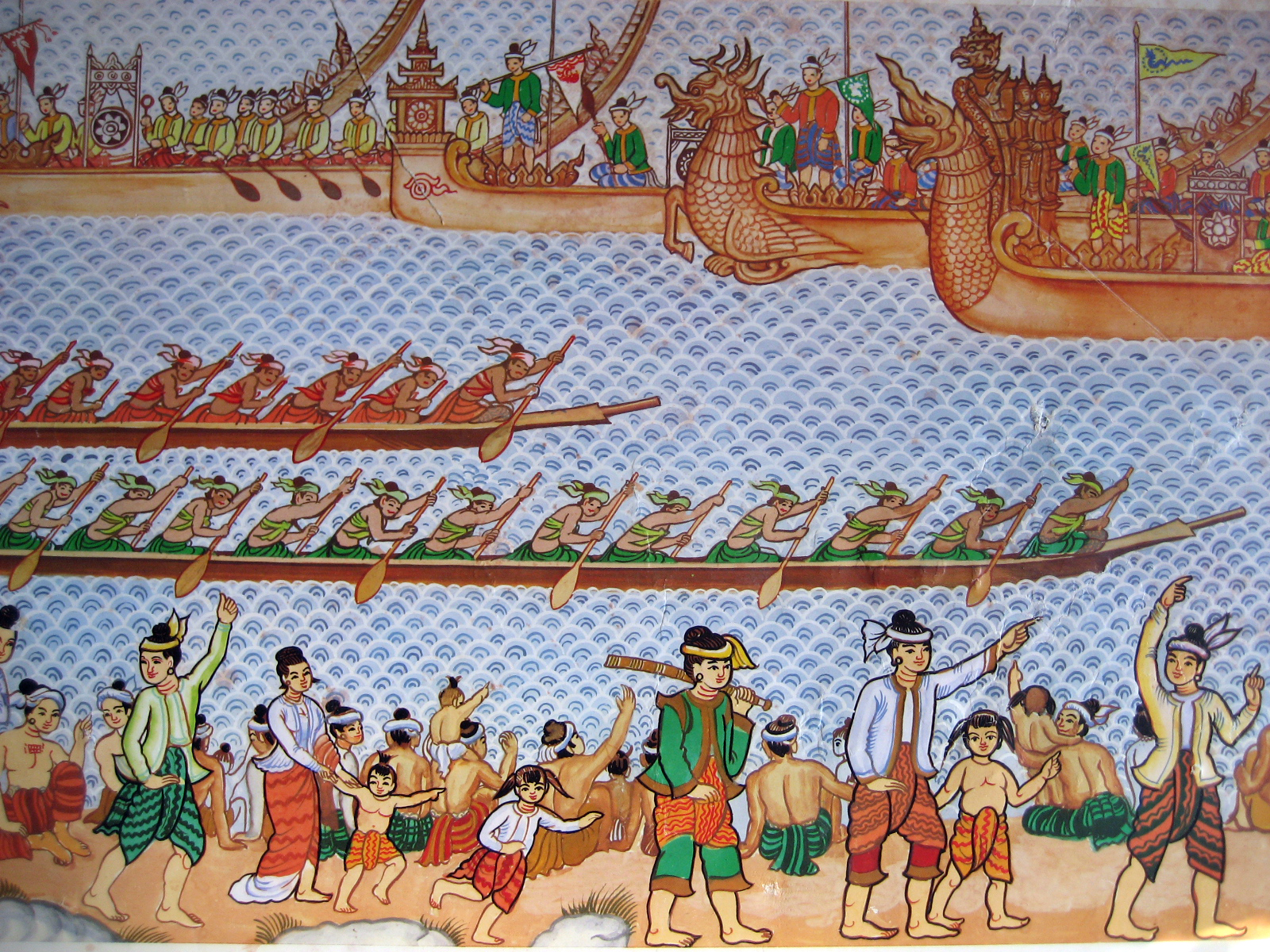
Hlei pyaingbwè - a Burmese regatta

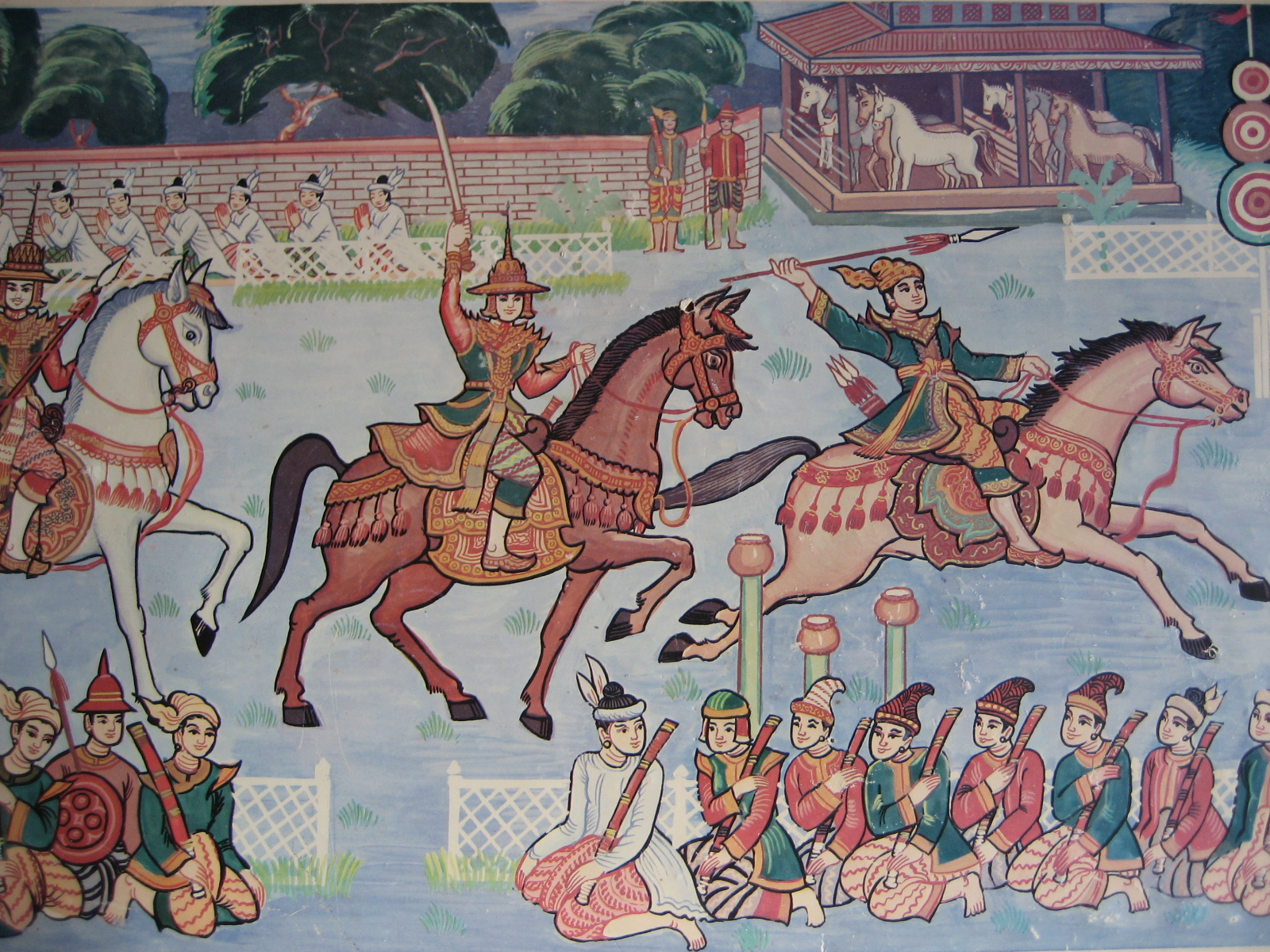
Myinhkin thabin - equestrian sport

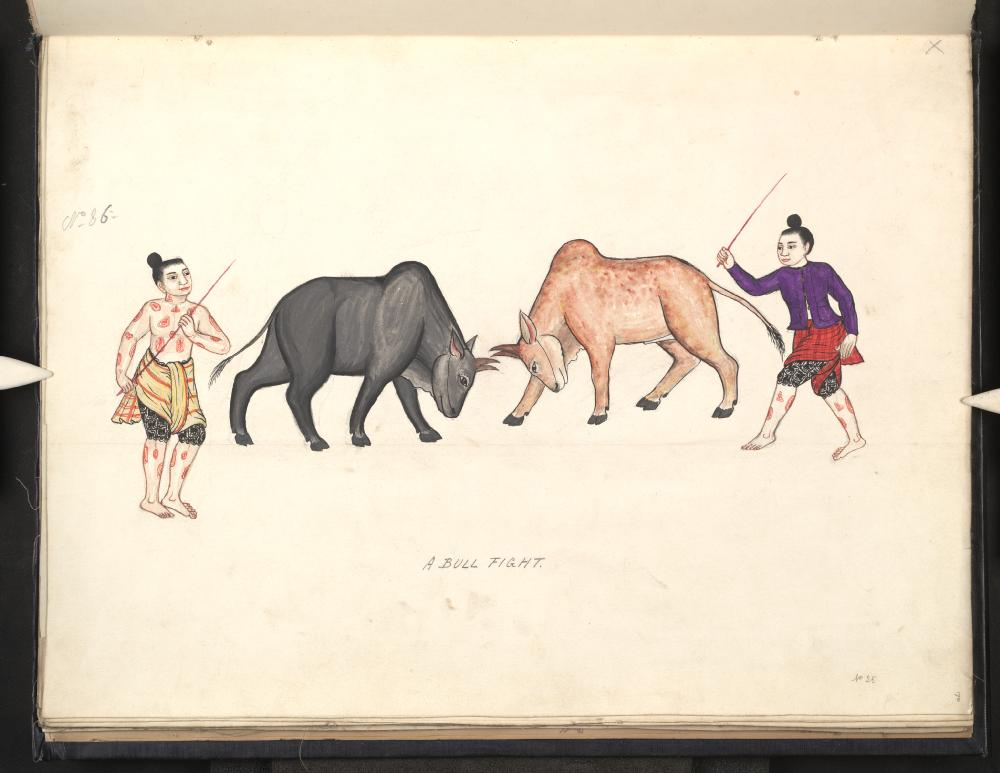
A bull fight, 19th-century watercolour

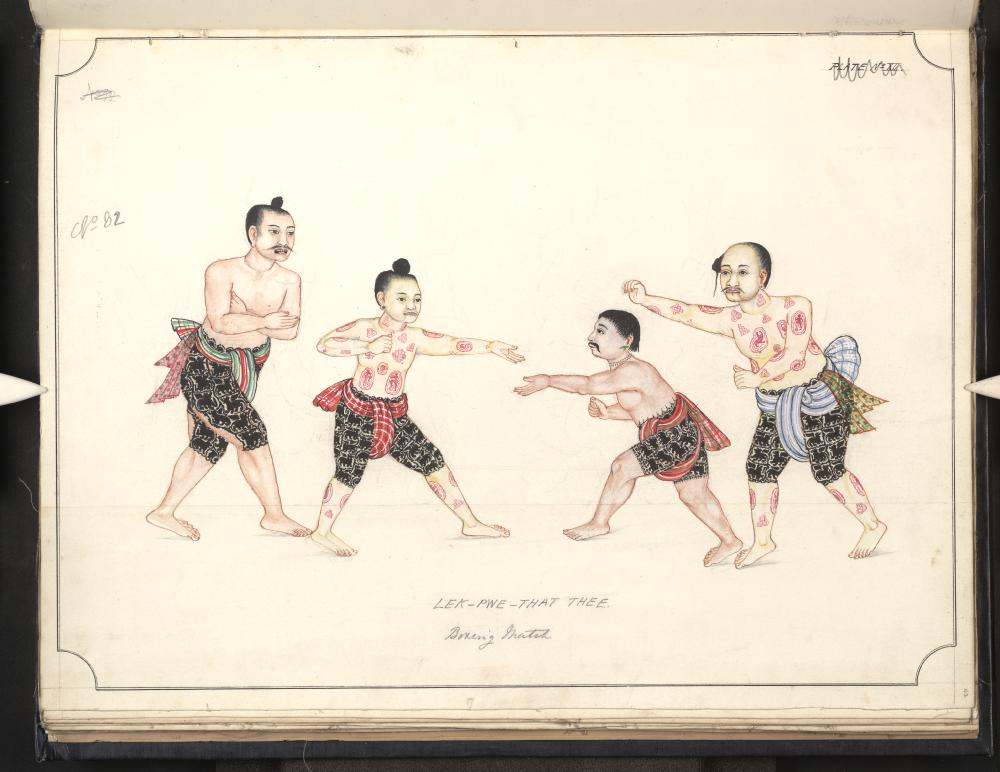
Boxing match, 19th-century watercolour

== Cinema and photography ==
The cinema of Myanmar and former British Burma has a long history dating back to the 1910s. Burma's first film was a recording of the funeral of Tun Shein - a leading politician of the 1910s, who campaigned for Burmese independence in London. During the 1920s and 1930s, many Burmese-owned film companies (such as A1, New Burma, British Burma, The Imperial, Bandula and Yan Gyi Aung) made and produced several films. Some of the famous directors of this era were Nyi Pu, Sunny, Tote Kyi, and Tin Pe. The first Burmese sound film was produced in 1932 in Bombay, India with the title Ngwe Pay Lo Ma Ya (Money Can't Buy It) and directed by Tote Kyi. Films dealing with social issues and political themes became popular in the 1930s.

After World War II, Burmese cinema continued to address political themes. Many of the films produced in the early Cold War era had a strong propaganda element to them. The film Palè Myetyay (Tear of Pearl), produced in the wake of the Kuomintang invasion of Burma in the 1950s, highlighted the importance of the armed forces or Tatmadaw to the country. Ludu Aung Than (The People Win Through) featured anti-Communist propaganda. The script was written by U Nu, who served as Prime Minister during the 1950s. The famous film maker and author Thukha started producing films during this period. His most famous film is Bawa Thanthaya (The Life Cycle). Burma held its first Academy Awards in 1952. Starting with the Socialist era in 1962, there was strict censorship and control of film scripts.

In the era that followed the political events of 1988, the film industry has been increasingly controlled by the government. After the 1989 move by the government to open up the economy, the movie industry was privatised. The film company Mingala became the most powerful company in the industry. Film stars who had been involved in the political activities of the 1980s and 1990s, such as Aung Lwin and Tun Wai, were banned from appearing in films.

In the 21st century, Myanmar cinema gained visibility in international film festivals. In 2014, The Maw Naing's The Monk was premiered at the 49th Karlovy Vary International Film Festival. Followed by the participation in main competitions as Wera Aung's short film The Robe at 21st Busan International Film Festival, Aung Phyoe's Cobalt Blue at 72nd Locarno Film Festival. and Maung Sun's Money Has Four Legs at 74th Locarno Film Festival. In 2019, some local media reported a revival in the local movie industry, stating that in 2016 there were 12 movies cleared by local censorship and waiting to be screened, 18 in 2017, more than 40 in 2018, and more than 60 in 2019. The success of Now and Ever (2019), starring Zenn Kyi, was also cited as evidence of the revival.

=== Photography ===
Documenting and promoting aspects of modern visual culture, the Myanmar Photo Archive (MPA) is both a physical archive of photographs taken between 1890 and 1995 in Myanmar and the country's former period of British Burma. Further, MPA is an ongoing project for the public awareness of the country's social history. Through various exhibitions, an online presentation and a publication programme, MPA has become known since 2013 for spreading Myanmar's photographic heritage, both on a local and an international level. With a collection of more than 30.000 images and other related material, MPA has become the largest archive for Myanmar's photographic history. MPA also has published books on the history of photography in Myanmar and former Burma and has been engaged in public events and artistic re-evaluation of the archive's collections.

== National holidays ==
Date (2010)	English name	Burmese name	Remarks
4 January	Independence Day	လွတ်လပ်ရေးနေ့ Lut lat yay nei	marks independence from British Empire in 1948
12 February	Union Day	ပြည်ထောင်စုနေ့ Pyidaungzu nei	anniversary of the Panglong Agreement in 1947
26 February	Full Moon of Tabaung	တပေါင်းလပြည့်နေ့ Tabaung la pyei nei	Tabaung pwè Pagoda Festivals
2 March	Peasants Day	တောင်သူလယ်သမားနေ့ Taungthu lèthama nei	anniversary of Ne Win's coup
27 March	Tatmadaw Day	တော်လှန်ရေးနေ့ Taw hlan yei nei	formerly Resistance Day (against the Japanese occupation in 1945)
13–16 April	Thingyan Festival	သင်္ကြန် Thingyan	celebrates and brings in the Burmese New Year
17 April	Burmese New Year	နှစ်ဆန်းတစ်ရက်နေ့ Hnit hsan ta yet nei	marks the New Year of the Burmese calendar
1 May	Labour Day	အလုပ်သမားနေ့ a louk thama nei	Workers' day
8 May	Full Moon of Kason	ကဆုန်လပြည့်ဗုဒ္ဓနေ့ Kason la pyei Boda nei	anniversary of the birth, enlightenment and death of the Buddha celebrated by watering the Bodhi tree
19 July	Martyrs' Day	အာဇာနည်နေ့ Azani nei	commemorates the assassination of Aung San and several other cabinet members in 1947
26 July	Beginning of Buddhist Lent	ဝါဆိုလပြည့်နေ့ Waso la pyei nei	
23 October	End of Buddhist Lent	သီတင်းကျွတ် Thadingyut	Festival of Lights
Oct - Nov	Deepavali	ဒေဝါလီနေ့ Deiwali nei	Hindu festival of lights day
21 November	Tazaungdaing festival	တန်ဆောင်မုန်းလပြည့်နေ့ Tazaungmon la pyei nei	Festival of Flying Lanterns/Hot-air Balloons
1 December (10th Day after Full Moon of Tazaungmong)	National Day	အမျိုးသားနေ့ Amyotha nei	anniversary of the first university students strike in 1920
25 December	Christmas	ခရစ္စမတ်နေ့ Hkarissamat nei	
Dec - Jan	Eid ul-Adha	အိဒ်နေ့ Id nei	a festival of sacrifice at the end of Hajj (annual pilgrimage to Mecca)
5 January 2011	Kayin (Karen) New Year	ကရင်နှစ်သစ်ကူး Kayin hnithiku	celebrates the New Year of the Karen people

== See also ==
- Bamar culture
- Burmese Buddhist titles
- Burmese names
- Monastic examinations
- Monastic schools in Myanmar
- Mythical creatures in Burmese folklore
- Satuditha
- University of Culture, Mandalay
- University of Culture, Yangon
- List of museums in Burma
