= Pat waing =

Pitched percussion instrument

Percussion instrument
- Other names: Pat waing Pat wang

More articles or information
- Music of Myanmar

The pat waing (Burmese: ပတ်ဝိုင်း) is a set of 21 pitched hand drums used in the Burmese folk musical ensemble (hsaing waing).

The player sits in the middle of a horseshoe-shaped shell made of elaborately carved wood and decorated with gold leaf. The 21 drums are played with the bare hands. Originally known as the saing waing because the drums were hung on eight carved wooden plunks in a circle, the instrument is now generally referred to as a pat waing.

== See also ==
- Hsaing Waing
