= Myanmar National Symphony Orchestra =

National orchestra of Burma

- Orchestra
- Founded: September 2001
- Location: Yangon, Myanmar
- Concert hall: National Theatre of Yangon
- Principal conductor: Yunosuke Yamamoto; Aye Thida Kyaw

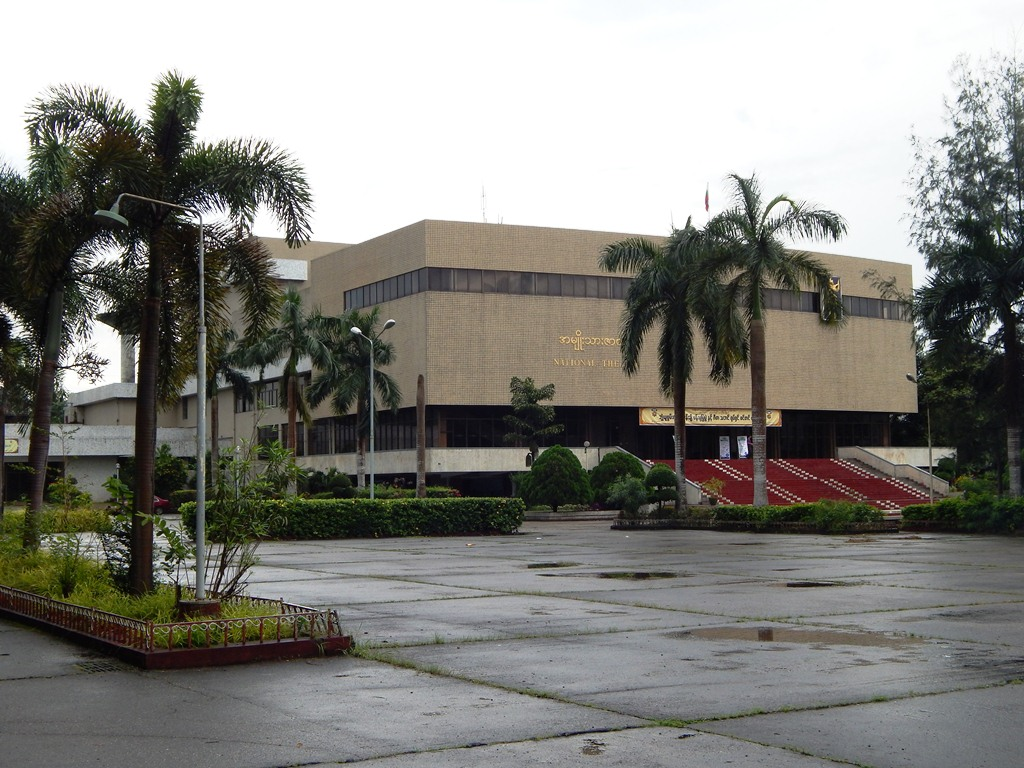
National Theatre of Yangon

The Myanmar National Symphony Orchestra is the national orchestra of Burma (Myanmar). Founded in 2001, the state-owned Yangon-based orchestra was allowed to give just one public concert of classical music in its first ten years of existence. After former Prime Minister General Khin Nyunt, the orchestra's principal founding supporter, was freed from house arrest, the ban was lifted in January 2012. It gave two public performances in July 2012 and made its international debut at Cambodia's Angkor Wat Temple in December 2013. Since 2014, the orchestra has been growing in capacity through a detailed exploration of the Beethoven symphonies.

== History ==
Plans to found a symphony orchestra in Myanmar went back to the early 1960s when a group of musicians were sent to study western classical music in the Soviet Union. But the plans never materialized. About four decades later, in September 2001, with the support of Gen. Khin Nyunt, then a ranking member of the ruling military junta, the country's first symphony orchestra was founded. Its members were drawn from the in-house band of state-owned Myanmar Radio and Television (MRTV), students of National University of Arts and Culture, officer musicians of the Myanmar Police Force, and a few foreign musicians.

In its early years, the orchestra struggled to find its footing, only training intermittently under the direction of an American musician. It was not until 2004 that the orchestra held its first and invitation-only concert at MRTV's Studio A in Yangon. But the progress was short-lived. In October 2004, its chief patron Khin Nyunt was purged and placed under house arrest. Viewed as a pet project of Khin Nyunt, the orchestra became a taboo, and was banned from holding any high-profile public activities. At one point, government officials went so far as to deny the existence of a national orchestra. The American instructor left shortly after, and the orchestra stopped practicing classical music. For the next several years, it was relegated to performing popular songs or folk music on state television. The only reprieve was in 2007 when the orchestra was allowed to give its first public concert after a successful plea to the government by a group of musicians from Europe. After a period of intensive training, the orchestra finally held its first public concert at the National Theatre in Yangon on 1 April 2007, playing the music of Haydn. A group of musicians from the Cambridge University also participated. But the concert was a one-time deal, and "the situation turned cold again".

The thaw began in January 2012 when Khin Nyunt was freed from house arrest. The government allowed resumption of public activities by the orchestra. In July, under the supervision of Yoshikazu Fukumura, a former conductor of the Kyoto Symphony Orchestra, the orchestra performed two public concerts in Yangon, playing the standards of Mozart and Beethoven. To fill gaps in its personnel, the orchestra had to enlist a few foreign violinists and oboists for the two performances. In all, the orchestra performed three public concerts in its first 12 years of existence. In subsequent seasons, the orchestra grew its capacity through exploring the Beethoven symphonies in sequence.

== Recent activities ==
In 2013, the current orchestra consisted of about 60 musicians, most of whom were graduates of the National University of Arts and Culture. It was led by the French composer Odile Perceau.

On 5 December and 6 December 2013, the orchestra made its international debut at Cambodia's Angkor Wat Temple. The strings section of the orchestra joined the French string quartet Le Quatuor Des Equilibres, and played contemporary and classical music to performances by the Royal Ballet of Cambodia.

Since 2014, the orchestra has been performing at concerts around the country under the direction of its principal conductor Yunosuke Yamamoto.

== List of conductors ==
- Odile Perceau (2013?–2014)
- Yunosuke Yamamoto (2014–present)

== See also ==
- Hsaing waing

== Bibliography ==
- Fujitani, Takeshi (9 July 2012). "Myanmar national orchestra ready to return to the stage". The Asahi Shimbun. Archived from the original on 15 December 2013.
- Kyaw Phyo Tha (14 November 2013). "Burmese Orchestra Joins With French Quartet for Concerts". The Irrawaddy.
- Myanmar News Agency (2 April 2007). "National Symphony Orchestra Presents Classical Music" (PDF). New Light of Myanmar.
- Vachon, Michelle (27 November 2013). "Cambodia and Burma to Come Together for Angkor Wat Show". The Cambodia Daily.
- "Cambodian, Myanmar artists to jointly perform at Angkor Wat Temple". Mizzima News. Xinhua News Agency. 26 November 2013. Archived from the original on 15 December 2013.
- Zon Pann Pwint (28 January 2013). "National orchestra seeks wider audience". The Myanmar Times.
