= Pattala =

Percussive musical instrument

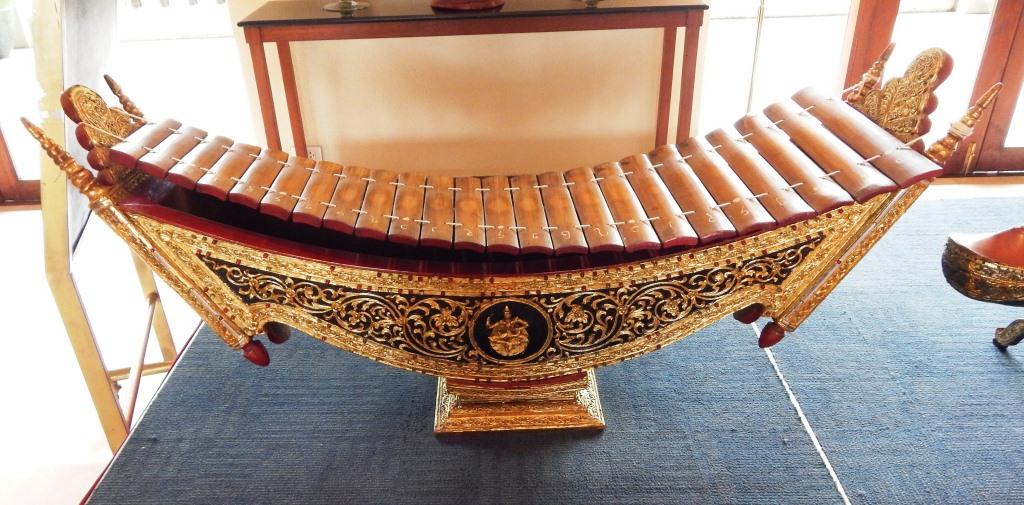

Percussion instrument
- Other names: Burmese xylophone
- Classification: Percussion instrument
- Developed: Before 1479

Related instruments
- Ranat ek, Roneat ek

More articles or information
- Music of Myanmar

The pattala (Burmese: ပတ္တလား patta.la:, Burmese pronunciation: [pattəlá]; Mon: ဗာတ် ကလာ) is a Burmese xylophone, consisting of 24 bamboo slats called ywet (ရွက်) or asan (အဆံ) suspended over a boat-shaped resonating chamber. It is played with two padded mallets. The pattala is tuned similar to the diatonic scale.

In modern days, classical Burmese chamber music is accompanied by either the pattala or the saung (the Burmese harp), both of which are capable of performing a harmonic countermelody. The pattala is also a key instrument in the Burmese ensemble orchestra, the hsaing waing. The pattala is also prominently featured in Burmese drama, anyeint.

== Etymology ==
The Burmese term pattala is a calque of Sanskrit vādya (ဝါဒျ, "musical instrument") and Mon (ကလာ, "chest"). The Mon equivalent is called patkala (ဗာတ်ကလာ). In the Karen languages, it is called paw ku.

== Origins ==
The earliest extant mention of the pattala is in the Kalyani Inscriptions, which dates to CE 1479, followed by a reference in a treatise during the reign of Bayinnaung. During the Nyaungyan era, the pattala was referenced in the poet-minister Padethayaza's verse poem, "Thuza Pyo" (သူဇာပျို့) as an instrument played for royal court affairs. The pattala is similar to other mainland Southeast Asian instruments, including the Thai ranat ek and the Cambodian roneat ek.

In pre-colonial Burma, the pattala was used in royal court music. In fact, when the piano was first introduced to the Burmese court in the late 1800s, it was tuned to the scale of the pattala.

== Construction ==
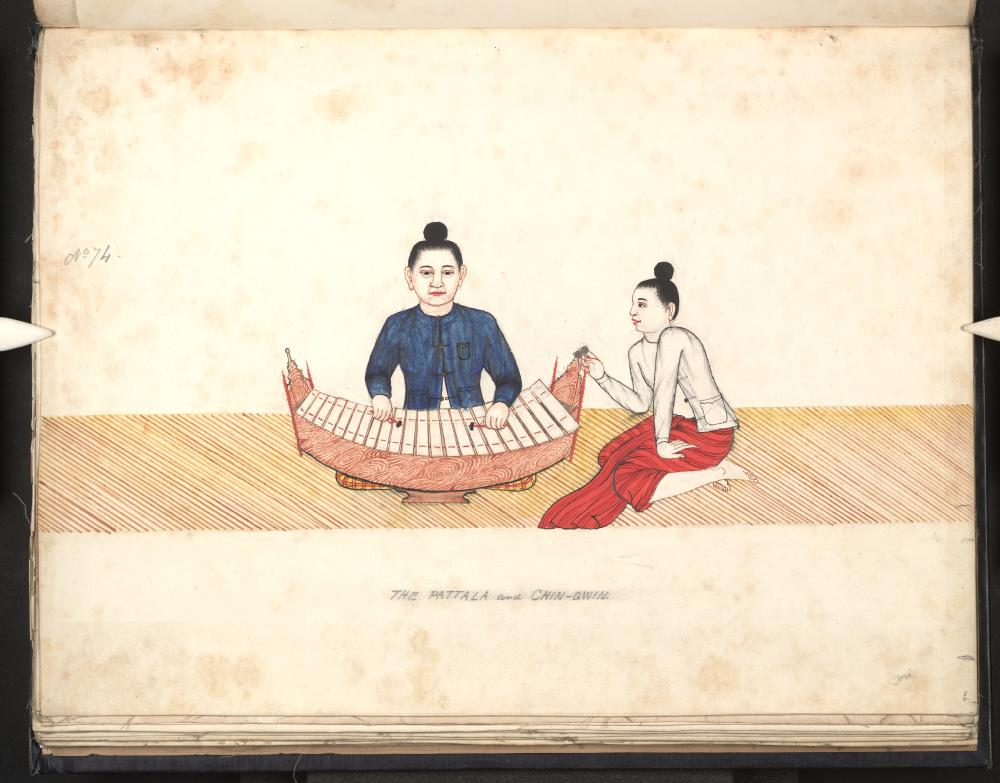
A 19th century Burmese watercolour depicting a pattala musician

The bamboo slats are typically made from the wood of giant bamboo (Dendrocalamus giganteus), which is durable and produces a stable sound. Slats are occasionally made from brass or iron. The mallets are made from hardwoods such as teak, padauk, black cutch, yindaik, or pyinkado. The resonance box is made from teak and decorated with inlaid glass or gold leaf.

The pattala's components have specialized names in the Burmese language:

- Pallin (ပလ္လင်, lit. "throne") — the base of the pattala
- Phanat (ဖိနပ်, lit. "shoes") — the foot of the pattala
- Bedaungbya (ဘဲတောင်ပြား, lit. "flat duck feathers") — the resonating chamber
- Myinmo taing (မြင်းမိုရ်တိုင်, lit. "Mount Meru pillars") — decorative protrusions from the resonating chamber
- Myinmo peik (မြင်းမိုရ်ပိတ်, lit. "Mount Meru closure") — either end of the resonating chamber

== See also ==
- Ranat ek
- Roneat ek
