= Hsaing waing =

Burmese folk musical ensemble

Hsaing waing

The hsaing waing (Burmese: ဆိုင်းဝိုင်း, pronounced [sʰáiɰ̃ wáiɰ̃]; also spelt hsaing waing), commonly known as the Burmese traditional orchestra (မြန်မာ့ဆိုင်း), is a traditional Burmese folk musical ensemble that accompanies numerous forms of rituals, performances, and ceremonies in modern-day Myanmar (Burma).

Hsaing waing musicians use a hemitonic and anhemitonic scale similar to the one used by Indonesian gamelan musicians. The ensemble's principal instruments, including the pat waing, kyi waing, and hne, each play variations on a single melody (heterophony).

== Origins ==
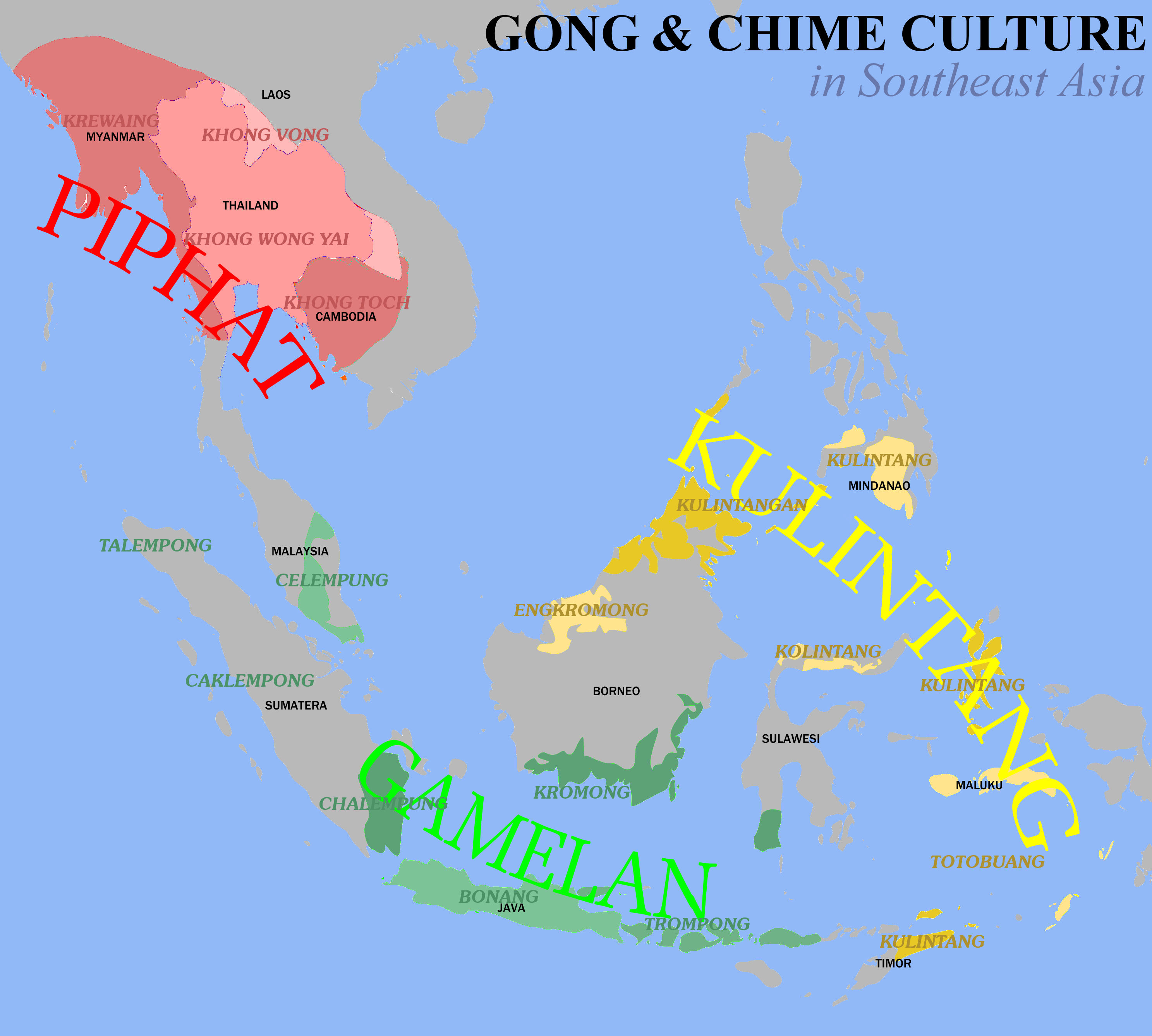
The three major indigenous genres of gong-chime music prevalent in Southeast Asia include the gamelan of western Indonesia; the kulintang of the southern Philippines, eastern Indonesia, and eastern Malaysia; and the piphat of Thailand, Cambodia, Laos, and the hsaing waing of Burma.

The hsaing waing is the product of indigenous musical traditions, enriched with contact with a diverse array of musical traditions in neighboring Southeast Asian societies. The hsaing waing ensemble's principal instrument, a drum circle called pat waing, continues to use Indian drum-tuning methods, and is considered the last remaining vestige of Indian instrumentation in Southeast Asia. Similar gong and chime ensembles are found in neighboring Thailand and Laos, where it is called piphat, and in Cambodia, where it is called pinpeat. However, these ensembles do not employ the use of a drum circle like the pat waing.

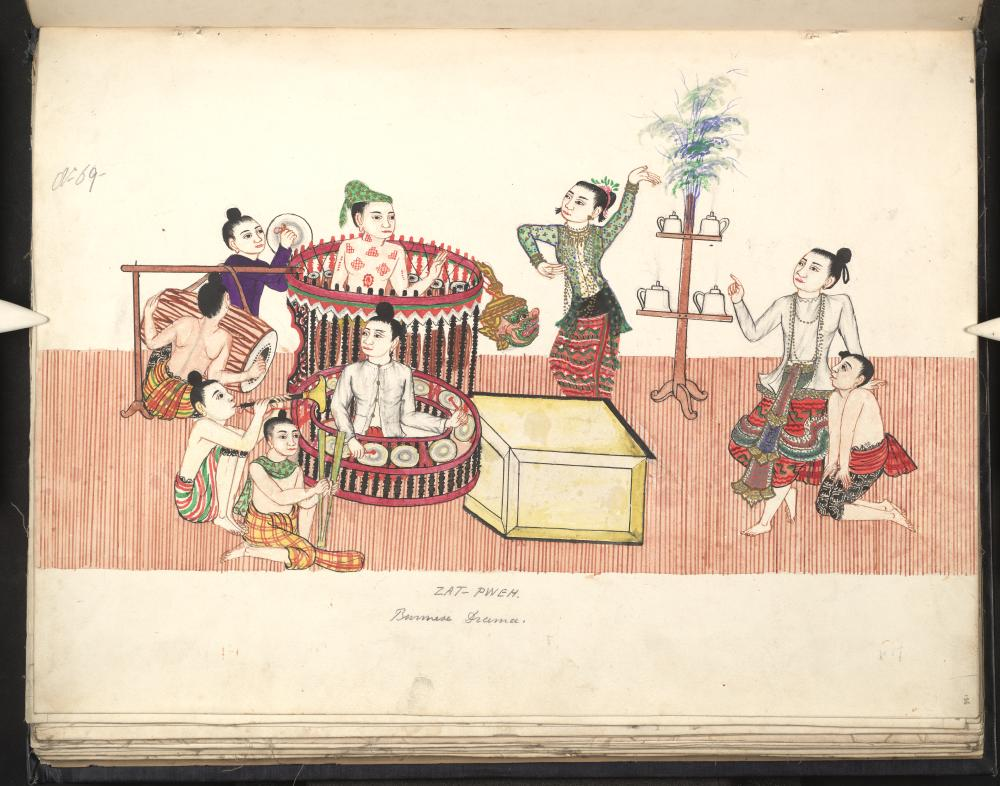
A 19th century watercolor depicts hsaing waing musicians accompanying a zat pwe drama performance.

The earliest pictorial evidence of the hsaing waing ensemble dates to the 1600s, coinciding with the Burmese invasion of the Ayutthaya Kingdom, which may have introduced additional instruments, principally a gong chime called kyi waing. However, the Burmese hsaing waing differs greatly in its diversity of instruments and musical style from Thai folk ensembles. Many of the hsaing waing instruments are shared instead with the piphat mon ensemble of Mon origin, indicating shared origins.

During the British colonial era, Sein Beda, a prominent musician, introduced various innovations to the ensemble, including decorating ensemble stands with traditional Burmese motifs and glass mosaic, introducing a jazz band to the ensemble, creating spotlights, and introducing uniforms for musicians.

== Instrumentation ==
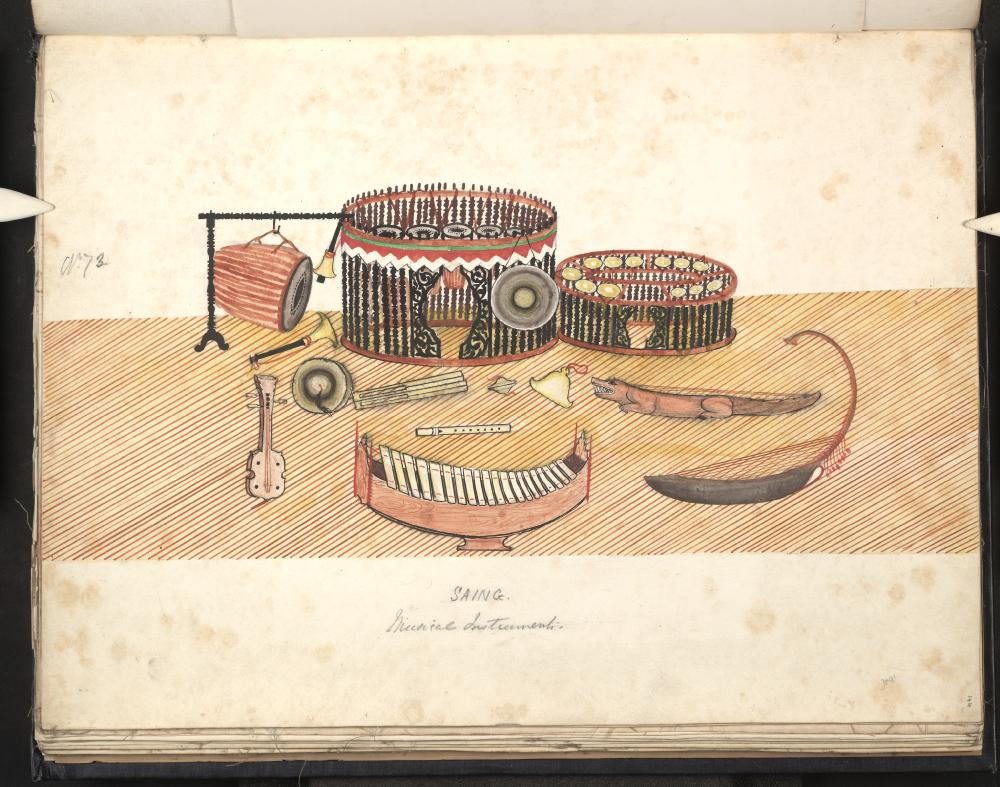
A 19th-century watercolor depicting components of the hsaing waing ensemble.

The hsaing waing ensemble includes a variety of percussion and wind instruments, including various gongs and drums:

- Pat waing (ပတ်ဝိုင်း) or pat lon (ပတ်လုံး) - a set of 18 to 21 drums in a circle with a range of more than 3 octaves
- Kyi waing (ကြေးဝိုင်း) - small bronze gongs in a circular frame
- Maung hsaing (မောင်းဆိုင်း) - a gong chime made of larger bronze gongs in a rectangular frame
- Wa letkhot (ဝါးလက်ခုပ်, lit. 'bamboo clapper') - wooden clappers
- Hne (နှဲ) - double reed oboe
- Si (စည်း) - bell
- Wa (ဝါး) - clapper
- Si to (စည်းတို)
- Lingwin (လင်းကွင်း) - cymbals that are typically made of bronze
- Sakhun (စခွန့်) - a double-headed drum on a stand
- Chauk lon pat (ခြောက်လုံးပတ်, lit. 'six drums') - a set of eight tuned drums
- Pat ma gyi (ပတ်မကြီး) - a big drum suspended from a pole frame depicting a mythical pyinsarupa
- Min pauk (မင်းပေါက်, lit. 'lord's entrance') - entryway made in the panels, forming the framework of a drum-circle

For more formal and classical performances, the ensemble may be accompanied by the saung gauk, the Burmese harp; the pattala, a Burmese xylophone; or the piano and violin, both of which were introduced during the colonial era. Brass sections may be added. The Mon version of the hsaing waing ensemble also includes a crescent-shaped brass gong chime called la gyan hsaing in Burmese.

=== Types ===
Music from the hsaing waing ensemble accompanies singing, dancing, and dialogues in all types of theatrical performances. Burmese scholarship recognizes 5 main types of hsaing waing ensembles:

1. Bala hsaing (ဗလာဆိုင်း) - performed at celebratory occasions such as weddings, Buddhist ordainment rituals (shinbyu), ear-piercing ceremonies, funerals, lethwei competitions, and pagoda commemorations
2. Zat hsaing (ဇာတ်ဆိုင်း) - accompanies traditional dramatic theatre and play performances
3. Yokthe hsaing (ရုပ်သေးဆိုင်း) - accompanies classical marionette (puppetry) shows
4. Nat hsaing (နတ်ဆိုင်း) - accompanies spirit propitiation rituals
5. Anyeint hsaing (အငြိမ့်ဆိုင်း) - accompanies traditional anyeint performances

The distinct repertoire of recognizable tunes accompanies of each of these types of hsaing waing ensembles.

== Musical styles ==
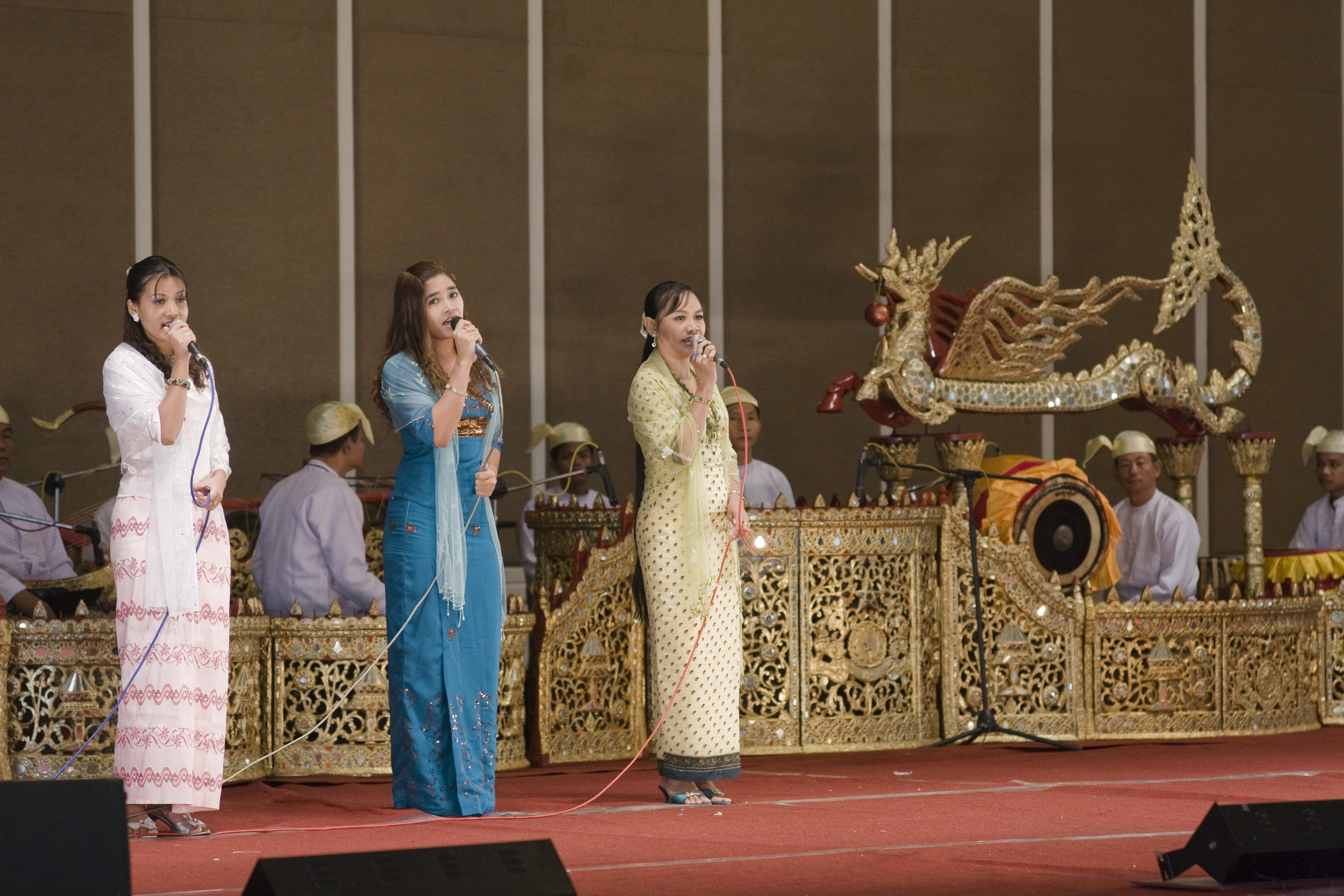
Hsaing waing ensemble is seen behind the singers

Music of the hsaing waing is characterized by dynamic, lively and sudden contrasts and shifts in rhythm, melody and tempo. Compared to most classical music from other countries, hsaing waing is more chaotic and is some what hard to follow along to. Most of the music does have a chorus, but it doesn't have to necessarily repeat again nearly at the end. The melody typically follows a regular meter of 4 to 8 beats. Anyeint dance performances, as well as nat gadaw and marionette puppet performances, are accompanied by the music of the hsaing waing, with the sudden shifts in musical rhythm reflected in the dancer's changing poses. The melody is shaped by tones; a complex system of pitches, principal and auxiliary tones, and melodic phrase terminals (cadential formulas), ornaments, and the vocal lines are associated with particular modes, which are context-driven (depending on environment and stage situations) and express varying emotions. The gong instrumentation provide repetitive motifs (see ostinato) during the course of a performance.

By contrast, classical singing of the Mahāgīta tradition derived from royal chamber music, which is characterized by a quieter and more restrained musical style, is accompanied by either a classical ensemble or a single saung gauk.

== See also ==
- Myanmar National Symphony Orchestra
- Pinpeat
- Piphat
