= Padauk Pinle =

- Film poster
- Burmese: ပိတောက်ပင်လယ်
- Directed by: Maung Tin Oo
- Screenplay by: Maung Thura
- Story by: Ko Aung Min Thein
- Starring: Yaza Ne Win; Htun Eaindra Bo; Zaw One; Zarganar; Kutho; Bay Lu Wa
- Release date: 14 March 2003
- Running time: 120 minutes
- Country: Myanmar
- Language: Burmese

Padauk Pinle (Burmese: ပိတောက်ပင်လယ်), also known as Sea of Padauk, is a 2003 Burmese musical-drama film, directed by Maung Tin Oo starring Yaza Ne Win, Htun Eaindra Bo, Zaw One, Zarganar, Kutho and Bay Lu Wa.

== Cast ==
- Yaza Ne Win
- Htun Eaindra Bo
- Zaw One
- Zarganar
- Kutho
- Bay Lu Wa
- Zaw Win Htut

== Release ==
It was released on 14 March 2003.
