= Ma Nyein Thaw Mee =

2002 Burmese Film

- Film Poster
- Burmese: မငြိမ်းသောမီး
- Directed by: Naung Htun Lwin; Nyi Nyi Htun Lwin
- Screenplay by: Soe Gyi; Ko Kyaw Zaw
- Story by: Steel
- Starring: Dwe; Moht Moht Myint Aung; Nandar Hlaing; Nay Aung; Cho Pyone
- Cinematography: Kyi Htun
- Edited by: Thar Gyi (super star); Maung Thi La
- Production company: Country Star Film Production
- Release date: 2002
- Running time: 143 minutes
- Country: Myanmar
- Language: Burmese

Ma Nyein Thaw Mee (Burmese: မငြိမ်းသောမီး) is a 2002 Burmese drama film, directed by Naung Htun Lwin and Nyi Nyi Htun Lwin starring Dwe, Moht Moht Myint Aung, Nandar Hlaing, Nay Aung and Cho Pyone.

== Cast ==
- Dwe as Ye Yint
- Moht Moht Myint Aung as Khin Khin Kyaw
- Nandar Hlaing as Shwe Hinthar
- Nay Aung as U Moe Hein
- Cho Pyone as Daw Yin Hla
- Phone Naing as Maung Maung Kyaw
- Hsu Pan Htwar as Pan Ei
- Htun Htun Naing as U Soe Kyaw
- Wyne as Paing Soe
- Aung Khine as Aung Kyaw
- Myin Sai Thar Aung Aung as Toe Aung
- Kyaw Zay Ya as Win Zaw
- Nay Myo Aung as Aung Maung
- San San Aye as Daw Thet Pan
- Tin Tin Hla as Daw Kyar Nyo
- Soe Moe Kyi as Mya Yin
- Saw Naing as U Aww Bar
- Kutho as Sein Thaung
- Kin Kaung as Than Htay
- Nga Pyaw Kyaw as Khin Zaw
- Ayeyar as Ohn Kyaing
- Nyaung Nyaung as Ba Tint
