= Min Nae Mha Chit Tat Pyi =

2002 Burmese Film

- Poster
- Burmese: မင်းနဲ့မှချစ်တတ်ပြီ
- Directed by: Khin Maung Oo; Soe Thein Htut
- Screenplay by: Khin Maung Oo; Soe Thein Htut
- Story by: Khin Maung Oo; Soe Thein Htut
- Starring: Dwe; Eaindra Kyaw Zin; Nay Aung; Thu Maung
- Cinematography: Ko Ko Htay
- Edited by: Nyunt Myanmar Nyi Nyi Aung
- Music by: Trumpet Win Oo
- Production company: Moe Kaung Kin Film Production
- Release date: 2002
- Running time: 112 minutes
- Country: Myanmar
- Language: Burmese

Min Nae Mha Chit Tat Pyi (Burmese: မင်းနဲ့မှချစ်တတ်ပြီ) is a 2002 romantic-drama film, directed by Khin Maung Oo & Soe Thein Htut starring Dwe, Eaindra Kyaw Zin, Nay Aung and Thu Maung.

== Cast ==
- Dwe as Nyo Chaw
- Eaindra Kyaw Zin as Myo Myo, Myo Myint Myint Myat
- Nay Aung as U Myint Myat
- Thu Maung as U Lu Hla
- Wyne as Aung Lwin Oo
- Kutho as Bodyguard 1
- Kin Kaung as Bodyguard 2
- Phoe Phyu as Bodyguard 3
- Nga Pyaw Kyaw as Bodyguard 4
- Hnin Si as Mother of Nyo Chaw
- Goon Pone as Nyo Seint
- Zu Zu Maung as Phyu Lone
