= Maung Tin Oo =

Burmese film director

- မောင်တင်ဦး
- Born: Ah Par; 21 March 1942 (age 84); Mandalay, Myanmar
- Resting place: Mandalay
- Occupation: Film Director
- Partner: Tin Tin Aye
- Parent(s): Taingchit Thakin Thein Pe (father); Mya Mya (mother)
- Awards: Myanmar Motion Picture Academy Awards

Maung Tin Oo (Burmese: မောင်တင်ဦး ) is a five-time Myanmar Academy Award-winning Burmese film director.

== Early life and education ==
He was born on 21 March 1942 in Mandalay. His father is Thakin Thein Pe and his mother is Daw Mya Mya from Mandalay. He is the eldest of three siblings. His younger siblings included Zaw One, a Burmese actor and singer, and Swe Swe.

He studied a basic education at his mother's Taingchit High School. He studied up to 10th grade.

== Careers ==
He entered the film industry in 1964-65. In 1968, he studied under U Kyaw. He co-directed with U Kyaw in the film Say Lo Ya Say. The first directed film was Nay Htwet Thaw Nya (နေထွက်သောည).

== Awards and nominations ==
Year	Award	Category	Nominated work	Result
1978	Myanmar Academy Award	Best Director	Takhar Ka Tabawa	Won
1985	Myanmar Academy Award	Best Director	Thingyan Moe	Won
1972	Myanmar Academy Award	Best Director	Nayhtwat Thaw Nya	Won
1995	Myanmar Academy Award	Best Director	Titepwalhkawthan	Won
2011	Myanmar Academy Award	Best Director	Good Hearted-Stupid Person	Won

== Personal life ==
He was married to Daw Tin Tin Aye. They have three daughters, including Mee Mee Tin Oo.

== Death ==
At the age of 74, he died at his home in Mandalay on 2015.
