= Satuditha =

Burmese feast and merit-making activity

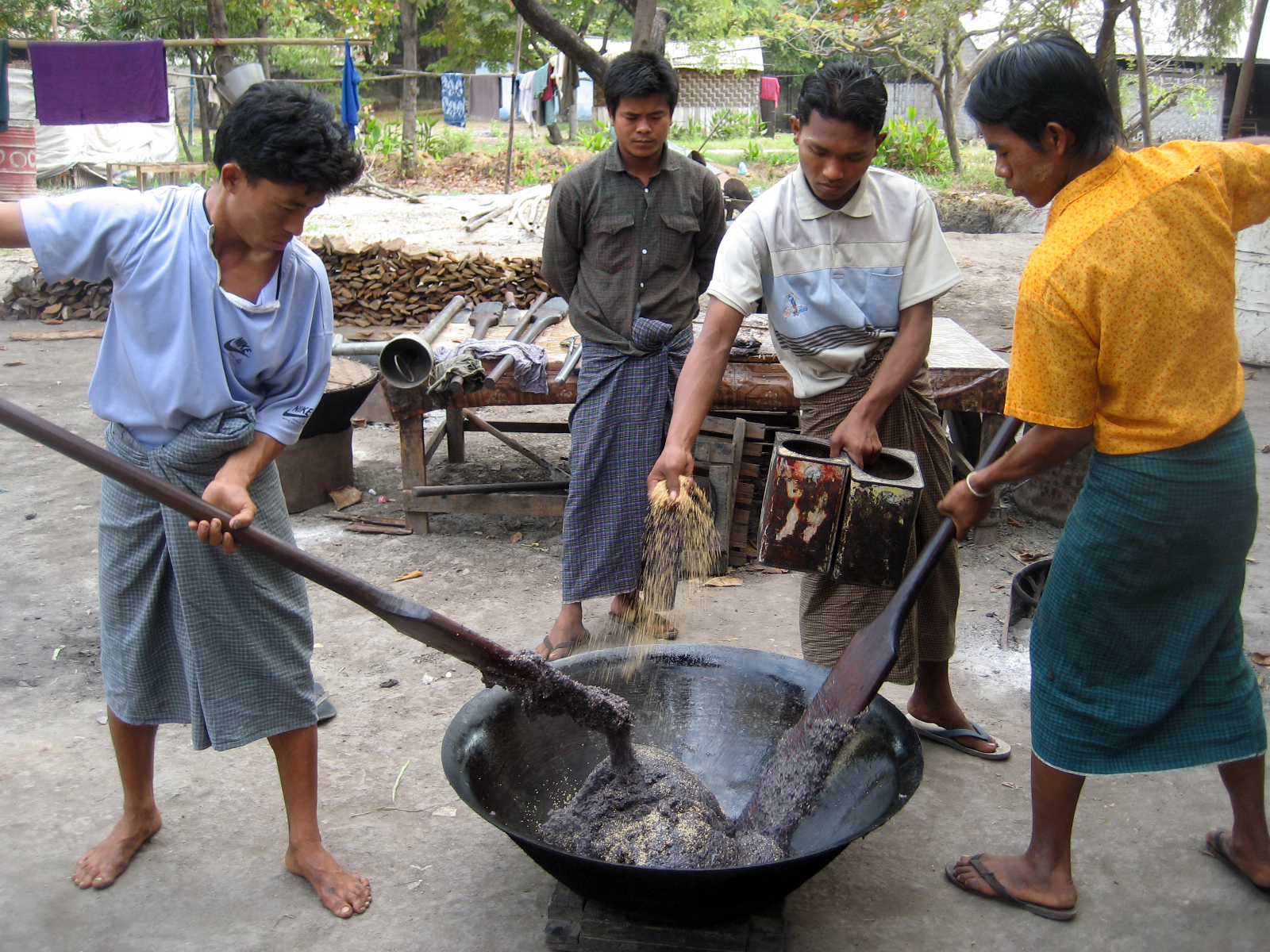
During the full moon day of Tabodwe, donors communally prepare htamanè, a seasonal delicacy, as a satuditha dish.

Satuditha (Burmese: စတုဒိသာ; pronounced [sətṵdìθà]) is a traditional Burmese feast and merit-making activity that features prominently in Burmese culture, reinforcing the importance of generosity and almsgiving as a Burmese cultural norm.

== Etymology ==
Satuditha is the Burmese pronunciation of the Pali term catudisā, which means the "four cardinal directions," in reference to the charitable act of offering free food or drink to those who come from the four points of the compass.

== Celebrations ==
During major festivities such as Thingyan, Thadingyut, and Tazaungdaing festival, donors throughout the country host satuditha feasts, preparing and handing out parcels of food or desserts such as mohinga, mont lone yay baw, Thingyan rice, shwe yin aye and mont let saung to revelers and passersby. Satuditha feasts are commonly held in conjunction with Nibban zay (နိဗ္ဗာန်ဈေး; lit. 'Nirvana market'), whereby members of the community organise donation drives for food staples like rice, cooking oil, and onion utensils, which are then distributed to the needy.

== See also ==
- Burmese culture
- Dāna
- Kundaung
- Zayat
