= Pterocarpus parvifolius =

Pterocarpus parvifolius is a taxonomic synonym of Pterocarpus macrocarpus that may refer to:

- Pterocarpus parvifolius (Pierre) Craib
- Pterocarpus parvifolius Pierre
