= Thangyat =

Burmese performance art

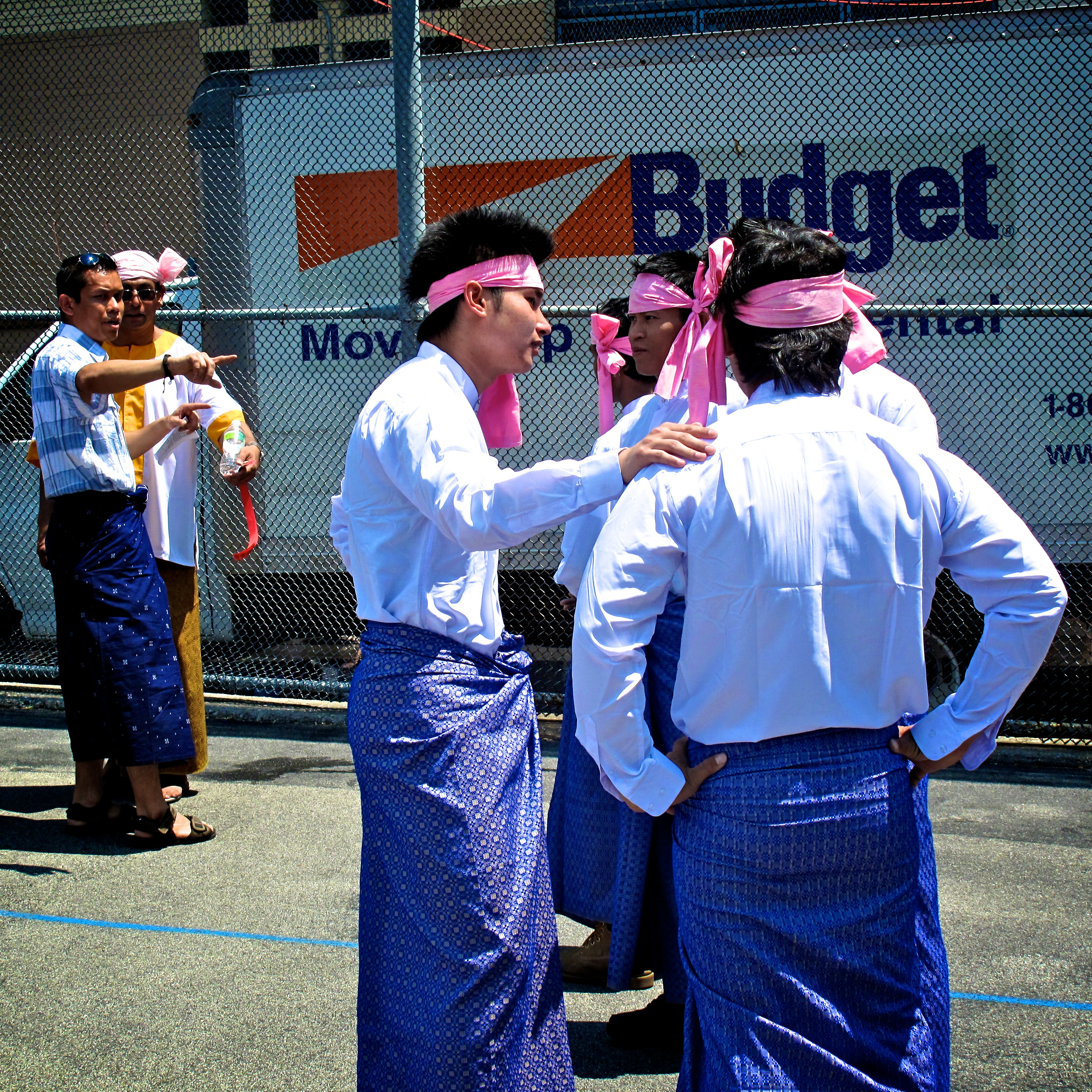
Thangyat performers in New York City.

Thangyat (Burmese: သံချပ်) is a Burmese performance art that blends traditional folk verse performances accompanied by the beat of traditional drums or a hsaing waing ensemble, and interspersed with song, dance and chant routines, and performed during festive occasions, particularly during Thingyan in the lead up to the Burmese New Year.

Thangyat are often subversive, humorous, and satirical in nature, expressing social and political commentary and public opinion. Following the 1962 Burmese coup d'état, thangyat performances were subject to censorship, with lyrics requiring pre-approval by a censorship board. From 1974 to 2013, thangyat performances were banned by the Burmese government under the rationale that thangyat performances undermined national security. Since 2013, the Burmese government has required thangyat troupes to submit lyrics to municipal thangyat committees for pre-approval.

== Format ==
Thangyat performances are comparable to slam poetry, as performers use numerous poetic and narrative formulae, and employ traditional theatrical devices, such as shifting voices and tones. A common format involves a call and answer segment between a lead performer called ataing (အတိုင်) and the chorus of followers called ahpauk (အဖောက်). Thangyat performances are enjoyed for their wit and use of wordplay.

== Political crackdown ==
In April and May 2019, seven young performers from a performance troupe, Peacock Generation (ဒေါင်းတို့မျိုးဆက်), were arrested after a thangyat performance in Yangon following a criminal complaint from the Tatmadaw (Myanmar Armed Forces) about the satirical content in their Thingyan performances. In October 2019, the performers were found guilty of undermining the military and livestreaming the performance, and sentenced to one year in prison. In December 2020, the troupe leader, Zayar Lwin, was sentenced to an additional 5.5 years in prison. In April 2021, three of the performers were freed under a national amnesty.

== See also ==
- Thingyan
