= Khao chae =

Thai dish of rice soaked in cool water

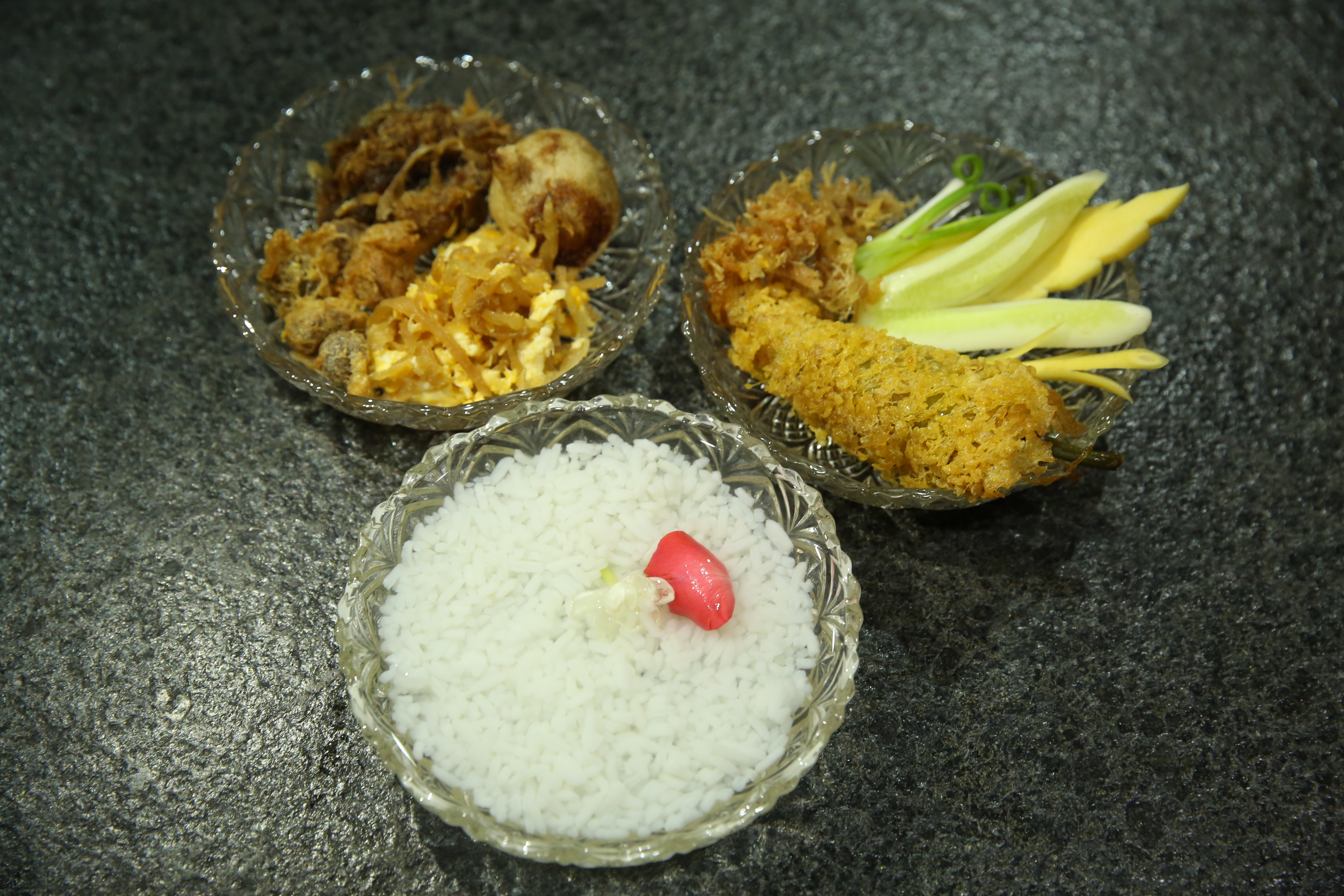
- Khao chae as served in Bangkok, Thailand.
- Place of origin: Central Thailand (adapted from the original Mon recipe)
- Similar dishes: Thingyan rice

Khao chae (Thai: ข้าวแช่, pronounced [kʰâw t͡ɕʰɛ̂ː]) is "rice soaked in cool water". "Khao" means "rice" and "chae" means "to soak". Around the time of King Rama II, the recipe was adapted from a Mon dish and then modified. It was meant to be made and consumed in the hot season, from mid-March to the end of April. Ice was not then available in Thailand, so the water was kept cool during hot season by putting it in an earthenware vessel in a shaded place. Some old recipes call for the use of camphor to cool the dish.

== History ==
The Mon people prepare this dish, known as Thingyan rice in Burmese, during the Songkran (Thingyan) Festival as part of their Thai New Year. When khao chae was introduced to Thailand during the reign of King Rama II, it was considered "royal cuisine" and not available to the public. According to Thai celebrity chef McDang, who grew up in a Bangkok palace, it's "the only Thai dish that can truly be considered 'royal Thai cuisine'."

Some of the most famous neighborhoods in Bangkok where it can be found include Banglampoo and Dinso road near the Democracy Monument, including Baan Varnakovida, both in Phra Nakhon.

== Ingredients ==
Khao chae is not easy to prepare. Ordinary jasmine rice is too soft, so the firmer khao taa haeng variety is used. It is first cooked in the normal way and then put in a colander and rinsed under running water several times to remove excess starch.

Next, a special ingredient: flower-scented water. A large pot is half-filled with water and a handful or two of fresh jasmine blossoms added. Then a small flower-scented candle is floated on top of the water, lit, and the pot covered loosely with the lid for 15 minutes. More blossoms and a candle with a different scent are then added and left for another 15 minutes—and then done for a third time. The scent from the candles and the natural oils from the jasmine should permeate the water.

Sprinkle the already cooked rice liberally with scented water, wrap it into a piece of cheesecloth, twisting the ends together to make a tight bundle to stop the rice from swelling. Tie a knot in the top. Steam over boiling water. To serve, transfer some of the rice into a bowl, cover with more of the fragrant water and add a few small ice cubes and some of the flowers.

The side dishes eaten with khao chae are the real stars of the meal. Recipes vary but the essentials remain the same.

At a well-known Bangkok restaurant, the following side dishes are served when khao chae is ordered:

- Kapi balls (ลูกกะปิ: luk kapi) made from shrimp paste (กะปิ) which is seasoned with wild ginger, shallots, garlic, palm sugar, all of which are pounded together into a thick soupy mix, placed in a wok and then heated to reduce the moisture so that a thick paste of highly scented shrimp is created. Afterwards it is allowed to cool and then rolled into small balls.
- Stuffed shallots (หอมแดงยัดไส้: hom daeng yat sai) Thai shallots stuffed with ground fish meat, herbs, spices, fish sauce, and palm sugar, then dipped in batter and fried.
- Stuffed sweet peppers (พริกหยวกสอดไส้: prik yuak sot sai) The peppers are stuffed with herbs, spices, and ground pork. Then they are steamed, allowed to cool, deep fried, and finally wrapped in a lacy egg wrap.
- Shredded sweetened beef or pork (หมูฝอย: mu foi หรือ เนื้อฝอย: nuea foi) Beef or pork, depending on preference. The meat is torn into strands, seasoning with palm sugar and fish sauce, allowed to dry, and then deep fried.
- Stir-fried sweet pickled Chinese turnips with eggs (ไชโป๊ผัดไข่ chaipo phat khai)
- Raw mango, fresh cucumber, fresh wild ginger, fresh chilies and fresh spring onions are served together to balance the sweetness of the side dishes and aid digestion.

== See also ==
- Thingyan rice
