= Bal Thu Pyaing Lo Hla Par Taw Naing =

1973 Burmese Film

- Film poster
- Burmese: ဘယ်သူပြိုင်လို့လှပါတော့နိုင်
- Directed by: Thukha
- Screenplay by: Nay Lin Htun
- Story by: Min Kyaw
- Produced by: Maung Tin Hla
- Starring: Zaw One; Win Hlaing; Tin Tin Nyo; Tin Tin Hla
- Cinematography: U Myaing; U Ba Swe; Tin Win
- Edited by: Htun Lwin
- Music by: Maung Ko Ko
- Production company: Thukha Films
- Release date: November 9, 1973
- Running time: 119 minutes
- Country: Myanmar
- Language: Burmese

Bal Thu Pyaing Lo Hla Par Taw Naing (Burmese: ဘယ်သူပြိုင်လို့လှပါတော့နိုင်) is a 1973 Burmese black-and-white drama film, directed by Thukha starring Zaw One, Win Hlaing, Tin Tin Nyo and Tin Tin Hla.

== Cast ==
- Zaw One as Eant Bwal
- Win Hlaing as Nyunt Hlaing
- Tin Tin Nyo as May Kyi
- Tin Tin Hla as Tin Tin Hla
- Eant Kyaw as Chit Sayar
- Thein Maung as U Thein Maung

== Awards ==
| Year | Award | Category | Nominee | Result |
|---|---|---|---|---|
| 1973 | Myanmar Motion Picture Academy Awards | Best Picture | Thukha Films | Won |
| 1973 | Myanmar Motion Picture Academy Awards | Best Director | Thukha | Won |
| 1973 | Myanmar Motion Picture Academy Awards | Best Supporting Actor | Eant Kyaw | Won |
