= Kin Kaung =

Burmese comedian and actor (1964–2019)

- ကောင်းကင်
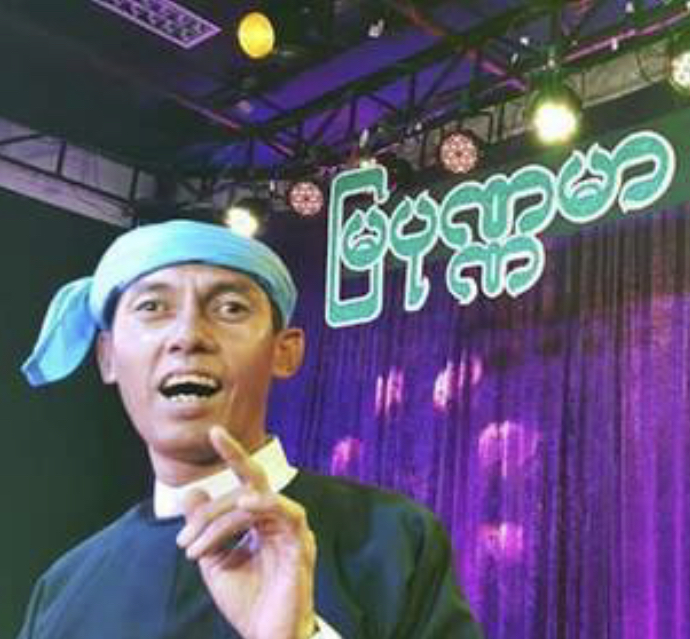
- Myanmar comedian Kin Kaung
- Born: Myo Myint; 21 May 1964; Rangoon, Burma
- Died: 22 January 2019 (aged 54–55); Popa, Myanmar
- Education: Yangon University
- Occupations: Actor, Comedian
- Years active: 1983–2019
- Spouse: Aye Aye Mon
- Children: Ye Mon Aung

Kin Kaung (Burmese: ကင်းကောင်, also spelt King Kaung, born Myo Myint; 21 May 1964 – 22 January 2019) was a renowned Burmese comedian and actor. He debuted as a comedian in the traditional anyeint troupe Mya Ponnama in 1985.

== Early life ==
Kin Kaung was born on 21 May 1964 in Rangoon, Burma. He is the second son of four siblings. After he finished high school, he began studying Burmese at the Yangon University. In his second year, in 1983, he went to the university anyeint to be a slapstick comedian.

== Career ==
In 1985, Kin Kaung became one of the comedians in the anyeint troupe Mya Ponnama, organized by Zaganar whose shows frequently appeared on television. Early on, his artist name was "A Shay Gyi" and eventually changed his name to Kin Kaung.

Kin became a professional famous comedian and actor for many direct-to-videos and films. In 1994, he was more popular in Thaye-Lay-Kaung opera performing together with actor Lwin Moe managed by director Mg Wana.

Kin Kaung and other members of Moe Nat Thuza anyeint troupe, including A Yaing, Phoe Phyu and Nga Pyaw Kyaw, were ubiquitous in the 1990s and 2000s. He also performed as a comedian in other Anyeint troupes, Thee Lay Thee and Say Young Sone. Other contemporary comedians were Po Phyu, Kyaw Htoo, Kutho, Myittar and Zaganar. Throughout his career, he has acted in over 200 films.

== Death ==
He died at Popa in the film shooting on 22 January 2019 at the age of 55.

== Filmography ==
=== Film ===
Year	Title	Burmese title	Role	Note(s)	Ref(s).
2001	Eain Met Yar Thi	အိပ်မက်ရာသီ	Saw Thein Win		
2002	Ma Nyein Thaw Mee	မငြိမ်းသောမီး	Than Htay		
2002	Min Nae Mha Chit Tat Pyi	မင်းနဲ့မှချစ်တတ်ပြီ	Bodyguard 2		
2003	Nhyoe Thaw Pinlal Swal Ngin Thaw Lamin	ညှို့သောပင်လယ်ဆွဲငင်သောလမင်း	Nanda		
2004	Style	စတိုင်			
2012	Aung Padin Inn Padaung	အောင်ပဒင် အင်ပဒေါင်း			
2014	Mar Kyi Shay	မာကြီးရှည်	Maung Nge		
2018	My Rowdy Angel	ကိုယ်စောင့်နတ်	School bus driver		
