= Style (2004 film) =

2004 Burmese film directed by Mite Ti

- Directed by: Mite Tee
- Written by: Taryar Min Wai
- Cinematography: Mg Thura; Mg Kyi Sein (A Twe A Yae)
- Release date: June 11, 2004
- Country: Myanmar
- Language: Burmese

Sa Tai (Burmese: စတိုင်) or Style is a 2004 Burmese romantic comedy drama film directed by Mite Tee.

== Plot ==
Maung Nay Toe is a very privileged child, the only son of a wealthy merchant family residing in Taunggyi. As his parents were very disciplined, he grew up well-behaved, being polite in speech and manner and sheltered from some of the harsher realities of life. Maung Nay Toe eventually leaves home and arrives in Yangon to pursue a music career and quickly becomes friends with poorer roommate Maung Yin Maung.

Friends Maung Nay Toe and Maung Yin Maung

One day, Maung Nay Toe goes to town to record a song and becomes infatuated with a girl named Ma Wah Saw Nge, the daughter of a retired school principal and equally privileged but shy, and also a snob. She gives him an ultimatum that unless he gives up his singing and returns to his wealthy family, their love life would come to an end.

Meanwhile, Maung Yin Maung, having met a girl named Khayt at his training course, also falls in love, but they eventually drift apart due to stark differences in their personality traits and attitude.

Maung Nay Toe and Maung Yin Maung, now both suffering knock backs in love, begin to feel depressed and briefly suffer from insomnia. When they eventually get some sleep they have dreams which reflect their desires - to become acceptable to their ex-girlfriends and rekindle their relationships. What they do not know is that the girls also regret their actions and eventually they became lovers again.

== Cast ==
- Lwin Moe
- Yar Zar Nay Win
- Pyay Ti Oo
- Soe Myat Nandar
- Eaindra Kyaw Zin
- Zarganar
- Mos
- Kin Kaung

== Release ==
The film was first shown on June 11, 2004, at Twin, Tamata, Mingalar in Yangon, Win Lite, Myo Ma in Mandalay, Nyunt, Shwe Hin Tha, Ye Tan Kon in Bago and San Pya in Myeik, Tanintharyi Division.
