= Yein =

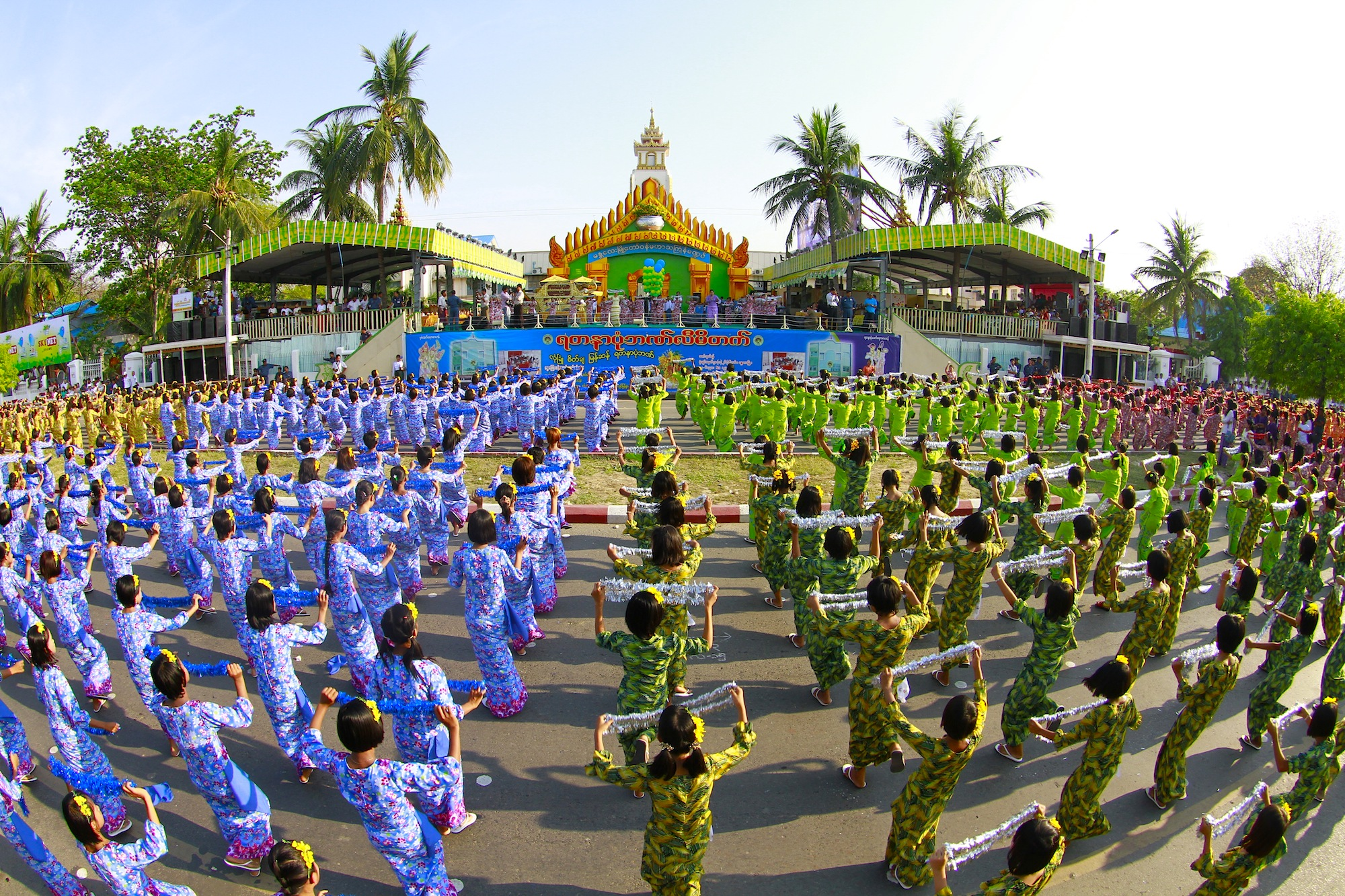
Yein dancers performing for Thingyan.

Yein (Burmese: ယိမ်း) is a form of group dance native to Myanmar (Burma). This dance form features multiple dancers synchronously dancing and moving their heads, waists, feet, and hands to the beats of music, often performed by a traditional Burmese orchestra called hsaing waing or drums.

== Terms ==
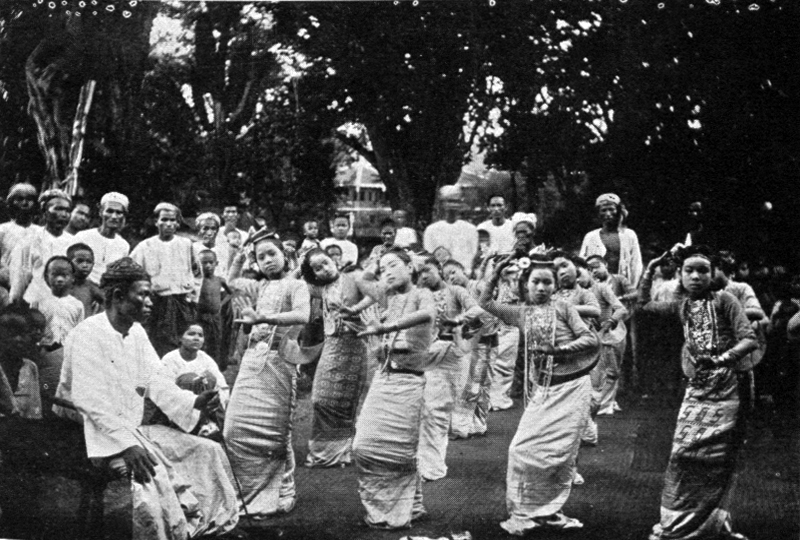
A village yein performance during the colonial era.

Yein has historically been known by various terms, including nat aka (နတ်အက, lit. 'spirit dance') during the Tagaung era, ka aka (ကာအက) during the Myinsaing era, and myewaing aka (မြေဝိုင်းအက, lit. 'earth circle dance') during the Konbaung era.

== See also ==
- Burmese dance
- Thingyan
