= Say Lo Yar Say =

1971 Burmese Film

- Film poster
- Burmese: စေလိုရာစေ
- Directed by: Shumawa U Kyaw
- Starring: Zaw One; Swe Zin Htaik; Lin Htin; Yway Yway
- Production company: Shumawa Films
- Release date: September 24, 1971
- Running time: 122 minutes
- Country: Myanmar
- Language: Burmese

Say Lo Yar Say (Burmese: စေလိုရာစေ) is a 1971 Burmese black-and-white drama film, directed by Shumawa U Kyaw starring Zaw One, Swe Zin Htaik, Lin Htin and Yway Yway.

== Cast ==
- Zaw One
- Swe Zin Htaik
- Lin Htin
- Yway Yway
