= Thingyan rice =

Traditional Mon dish of Myanmar

Thingan rice
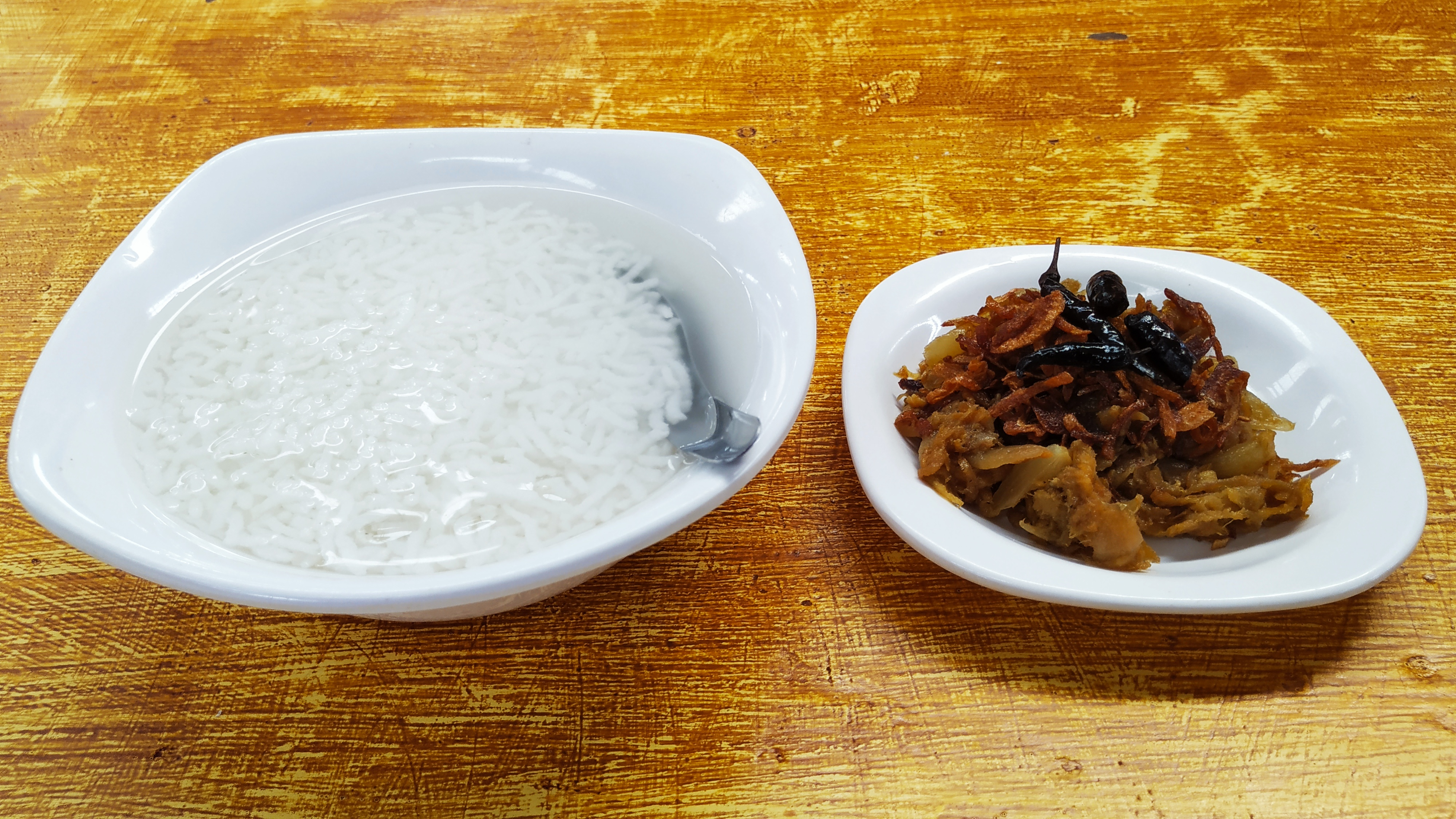
- Alternative names: ပုင်သင်္ကြာန်
- Type: Dessert
- Associated cuisine: Burmese cuisine
- Main ingredients: Rice, candle-scented water, fried dried fish
- Similar dishes: Khao chae

Thingyan rice (Burmese: သင်္ကြန်ထမင်း, pronounced [ðəd͡ʑàɴ tʰəmɪ́ɴ], Thingyan htamin; Mon: ပုင်သင်္ကြာန်) is a Mon dish served during Thingyan, a festival which marks the Burmese New Year. Thingyan Htamin started with Mon people in lower Burma. It is commonly made with rice soaked in candle-scented water, served with fried dry fish. The water in the dish is for refreshment during the hot summer days of the Thingyan Festival. Families prepare large quantities to share with neighbors which is a way to share New Year Blessings. This festive dish has also been adapted into Central Thai cuisine, where it is known as Khao Chae.

== Preparation ==
The rice is cooked until soft, then rinsed in cold water to remove starch and chilled. At the time of serving, candle-scented water is poured over until the rice is submerged. This fragrant water is made by setting pieces of candle on hot charcoal and collecting the smoke in an upturned pot. After some time it is turned upright and covered with a cloth, through which water is poured.

Thingyan rice is served alongside Thingyan Fried, a combination of dried-fish such as Indo-Pacific King Mackerel, mango, and onions. Thingyan Fried is made by preparing three elements. In the first, dried fish are boiled, deboned, and then crushed in a mortar with dried shrimp. The second involves frying thinly sliced onion, tumeric, and fermented shrimp paste (Ngapi) in a pot, and the third stir-frying shredded green mango that has had its water contents squeezed out. Into the pan with the green mango, the first and second elements are added and fried until ready.

=== Regional variants ===
In some areas, vegetables like green beans or peas are added to the rice for extra texture. Other alterations include adding coconut milk for a creamier flavouror perfuming the water with rose or jasmine water.

In Thailand, a modified version is known as Khao Chae, regarded as a form of Thai Royal Cuisine, and is served during the Songkran Festival.

== Festival ==
Thingyan rice is prepared among the Mon people at Thingyan, a five-day Buddhist festival celebrated across Myanmar to mark the traditional New Year. Its dates are set annually by the Myanmar Calendar Advisory Board, usually in mid-April.

In both Myanmar and Thailand, Thingyan Rice (or Khao Chae) symbolizes purity, freshness, and merit-making, embodying the spirit of renewal celebrated during the New Year season. Its name, “Thingyan,” directly signifies the Burmese New Year festival with which the dish is closely associated.

In accordance with the general festival values of renewal, purification, and community harmony, the dish symbolizes spiritual cleaning and renewal in the New Year.
