= Thingyan =

Myanmar New Year Water Festival

Thingyan သင်္ကြန်
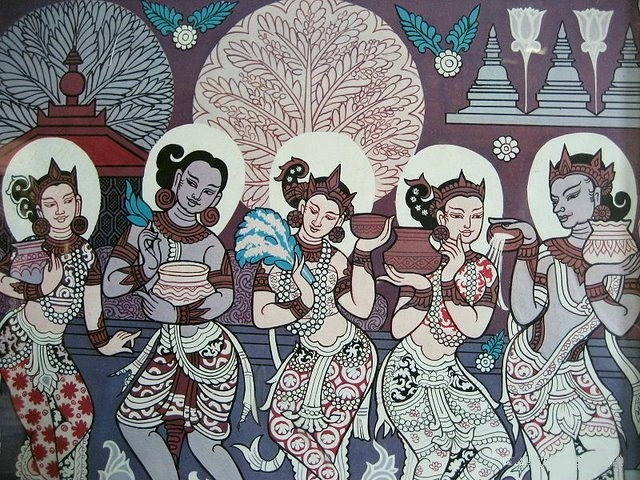
- Thingyan festival of Pagan Kingdom
- Also called: Myanmar New Year
- Observed by: Myanmar people
- Significance: Marks the Myanmar New Year
- Observances: Water splashing, merit-making activities, gadaw, almsgiving
- Begins: 13 April
- Ends: 16 April
- Date: 13–16 April
- Duration: 4-5 days
- Frequency: annual
- Related to: South and Southeast Asian solar New Year

Myanmar traditional New Year Atā Thingyan festival
- UNESCO Intangible Cultural Heritage
- Country: Myanmar
- Reference: 02085
- Region: Asia and the Pacific

Inscription history
- Inscription: 2024 (19th session)
- List: Representative

Thingyan (သင်္ကြန်), also known as the Myanmar New Year, is a festival that usually occurs in the middle of April. Thingyan marks the transition from the old year to the new one, based on the traditional Myanmar lunisolar calendar. The festival usually spans four to five days, culminating in New Year’s Day, and is one of the most anticipated public holidays across the country. The highlight of the celebration is the symbolic throwing of water, representing the washing away of sins and bad luck from the previous year. People engage in water fights using buckets and water guns, especially during the first four days. Streets become lively with music, dance troupes, and temporary stages called pandal (မဏ္ဍပ်,mandat).

Thingyan is not only a joyful festival but also a time for merit-making. Many people practice religious observances such as almsgiving, releasing fish and birds, and visiting monasteries. It is also customary to pay respect to elders and parents by washing their hair or feet. The New Year coincides with new year celebrations throughout Southeast Asia and South Asia, including Pi Mai in Laos, Songkran in Thailand, the Cambodian New Year, the Sinhalese New Year and festivals like Vaisakhi (Punjab), Puthandu (Tamil Nadu), Vishu (Kerala), Ugadi (Andhra Pradesh, Telangana, Karnataka), and Bihu (Assam) in India. It was also heavily influenced by Britain during the colonial period.

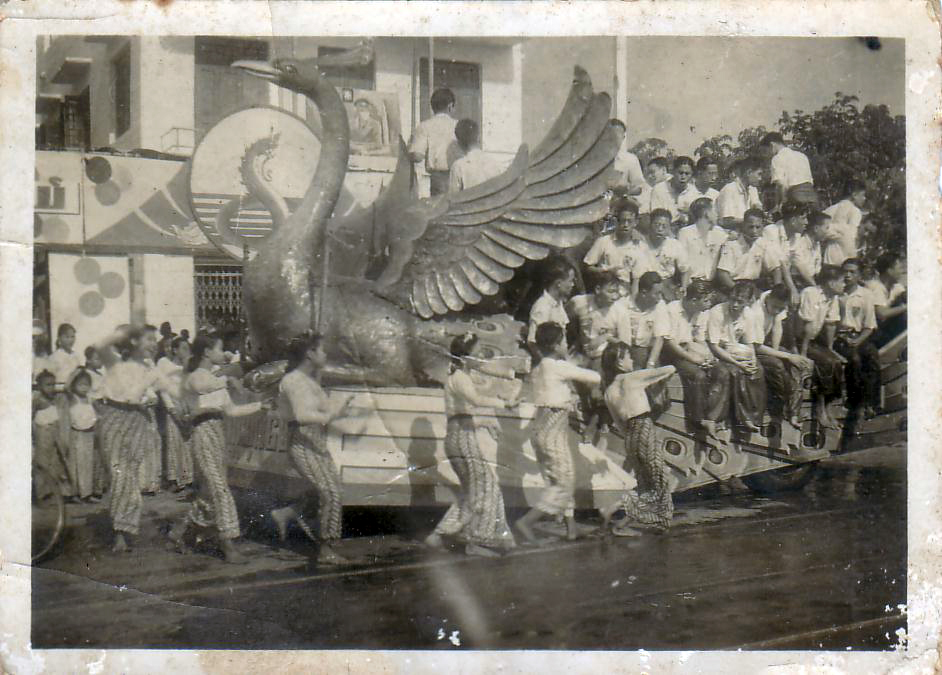
Mandalay City Thingyan 1950.

== Names ==
The name "Thingyan" (Burmese: သင်္ကြန်, pronounced [θɪ́ɰ̃dʑàɰ̃]; Rakhine: [θɔ́ɰ̃kràɰ̃]) is derived from the Sanskrit word, Saṁkrānti (Sanskrit: संक्रान्ति), which means the "transit [of the Sun from Pisces to Aries].". The period of Thingyan is also called Atā (အတာ) in Burmese. The holiday is known as Sangkran (Mon: သင်္ကြာန်) in Mon and as Sangkyan in Shan (Shan: သၢင်းၵျၢၼ်ႇ).

== Origins and history ==
The Myanmar Thingyan is historically anchored by epigraphic evidence and the traditional lunisolar system. The Min-Nan-Thu Ar-Yone-Swal Inscription (c. 12th century AD) provides one of the earliest recorded references to “Sankanta” (Thingyan) in Southeast Asia, documenting the ritual offering of scented water to Buddha images.

Unlike purely lunar festivals, Thingyan is a solar event calculated using the Surya Siddhanta. It marks the Sun's precise transit from Pisces into Aries, a system that has governed Myanmar's timekeeping since the 7th century (c. 638 AD). Royal records from the Pagan Kingdom (13th century) describe systematic water-pouring festivals under King Narathihapate, establishing the festival as a long-standing cultural and state tradition that predates many regional counterparts.

=== Origin story ===
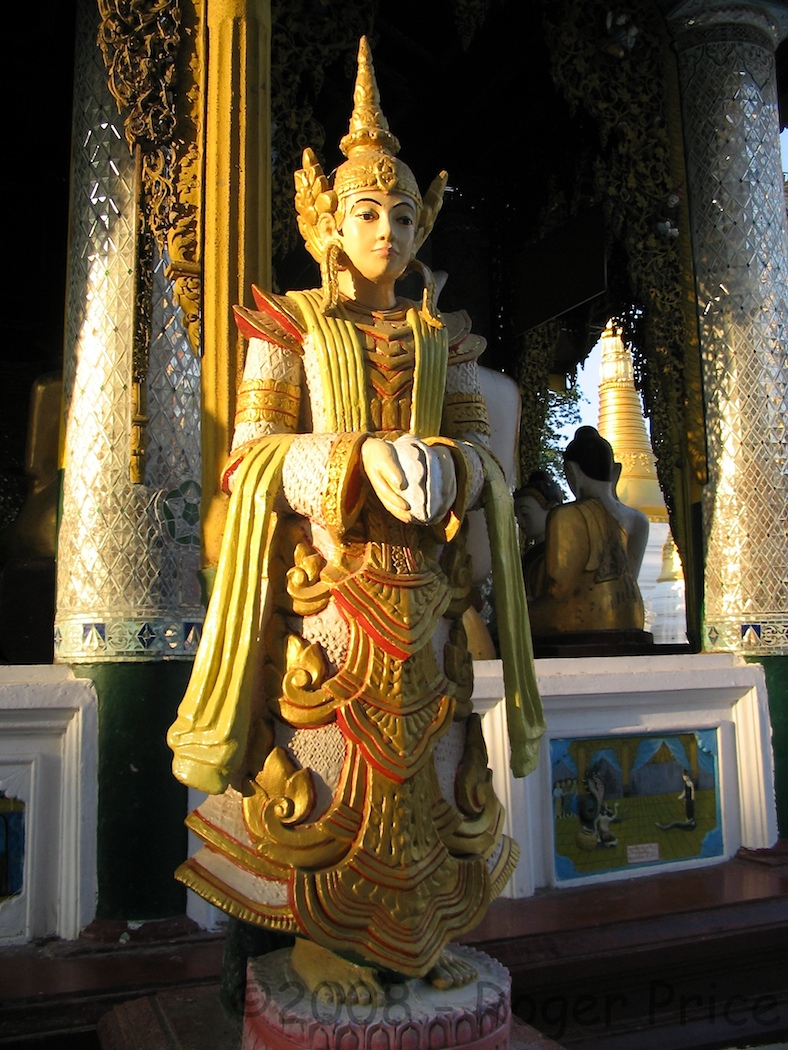
A depiction of Thagyamin at Shwedagon Pagoda

The story about Thingyan is a Buddhist version of Hindu mythology. The King of Brahmas called Arsi (အာသီ), lost a wager to the King of Devas, Śakra, also known as Thagyamin (သိကြားမင်း), who decapitated Arsi as agreed. Still, the head of an elephant was put onto the Brahma's body which then became Ganesha. The Brahma's head was so powerful that throwing it into the sea would dry it up, onto land would scorch it, and into the air would ignite the sky. Sakra, therefore, ordained that the Brahma's head be carried by one goddess after another taking turns for a year each. The new year henceforth has come to signify the changing of hands of the Brahma's head.

=== History ===
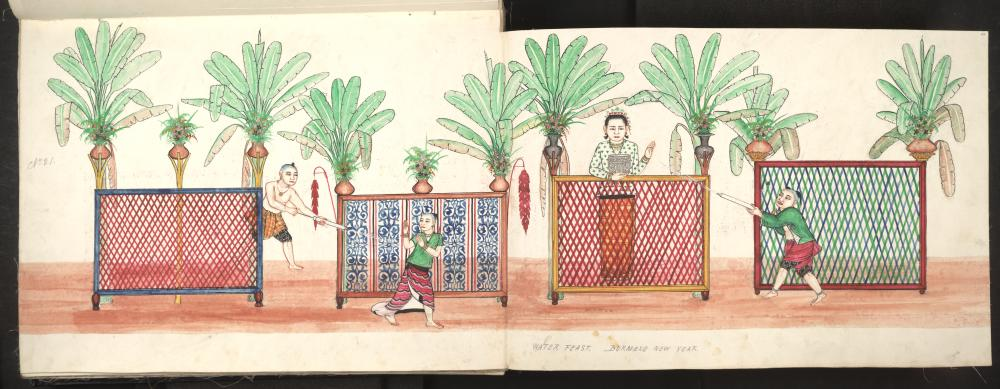
A 19th-century watercolor depicting Thingyan water play

Historians note that Thingyan was first celebrated during the Bagan period, coinciding with the establishment of the Bagan Kingdom in the 9th century. Historical evidence suggests these festivals were celebrated throughout the reign of King Anawrahta in the 11th century, continuing into the 12th and 13th centuries. Some historians speculate that a similar water festival was celebrated during the Pyu era (2nd century), although evidence remains inconclusive. The festival is recorded on a stone inscription at Sawhlawun Pagoda dating to 1291.

In ancient times, a cannon (သင်္ကြန်အမြောက်,Thingyan a-hmyauk) was used as a signal to notify the people that Thagyamin already descended Earth, which means the Thingyan Festival had already started. Once the cannon was fired, communities, including the members of the Burmese royal family, came out with pots of water and sprigs of thabyay, then poured the water onto the ground with a prayer. A prophecy for the new year (သင်္ကြန်စာ, Thingyan sa) will have been announced by the brahmins (ponna) and this is based on what animal Thagyamin will be riding on his way down and what he might carry in his hand.

== Day 1: Eve of Thingyan ==
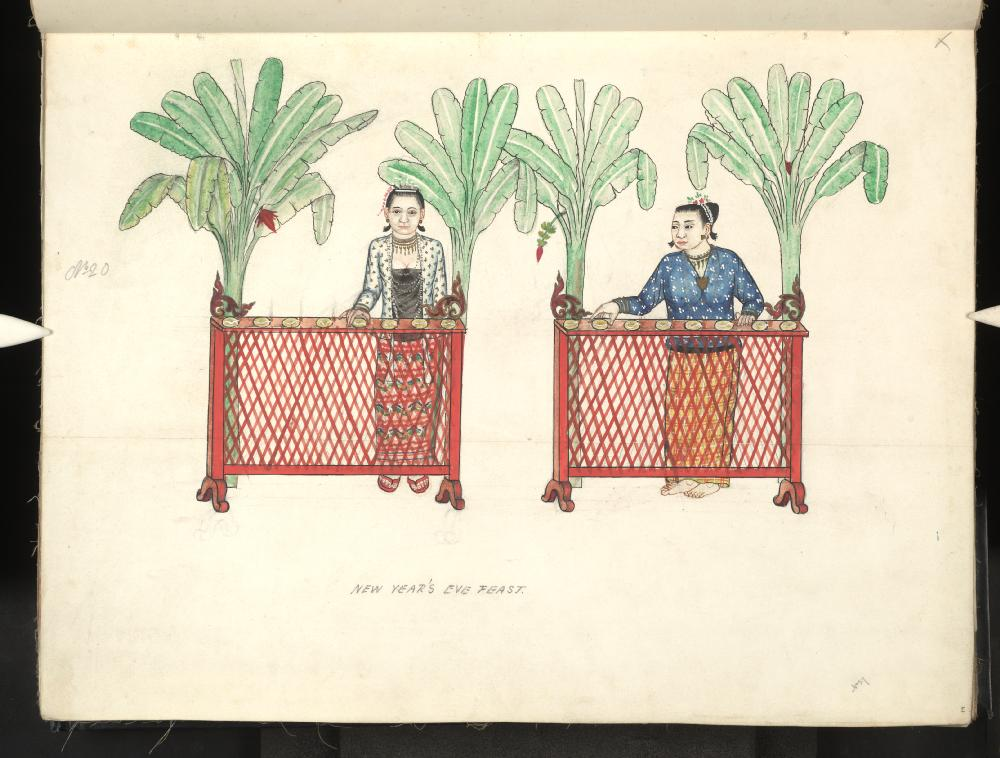
A 19th century watercolor depicting a Thingyan eve merit-making: lighting of oil lamps.

The eve of Thingyan, the first day of the festival is called "a-kyo" (အကြိုနေ့), and is the start of religious activities. Buddhists are expected to observe the Eight Precepts, more than the basic Five Precepts, including having only one meal before noon. Thingyan is a time when uposatha observance days, similar to the Christian sabbath, are held. Alms and offerings are laid before monks in their monasteries and offerings of a green coconut with its stalk intact encircled by bunches of green bananas (ငှက်ပျောပွဲ အုန်းပွဲ, nga pyaw pwè oun pwè) and Eugenia sprig before the Buddha images over which scented water is poured in a ceremonial washing from the head down. In ancient times, Burmese kings had a hair-washing ceremony with clear pristine water from Gaungsay Kyun (lit. 'Head Washing Island'), a small rocky outcrop of an island in the Gulf of Martaban near Mawlamyine.

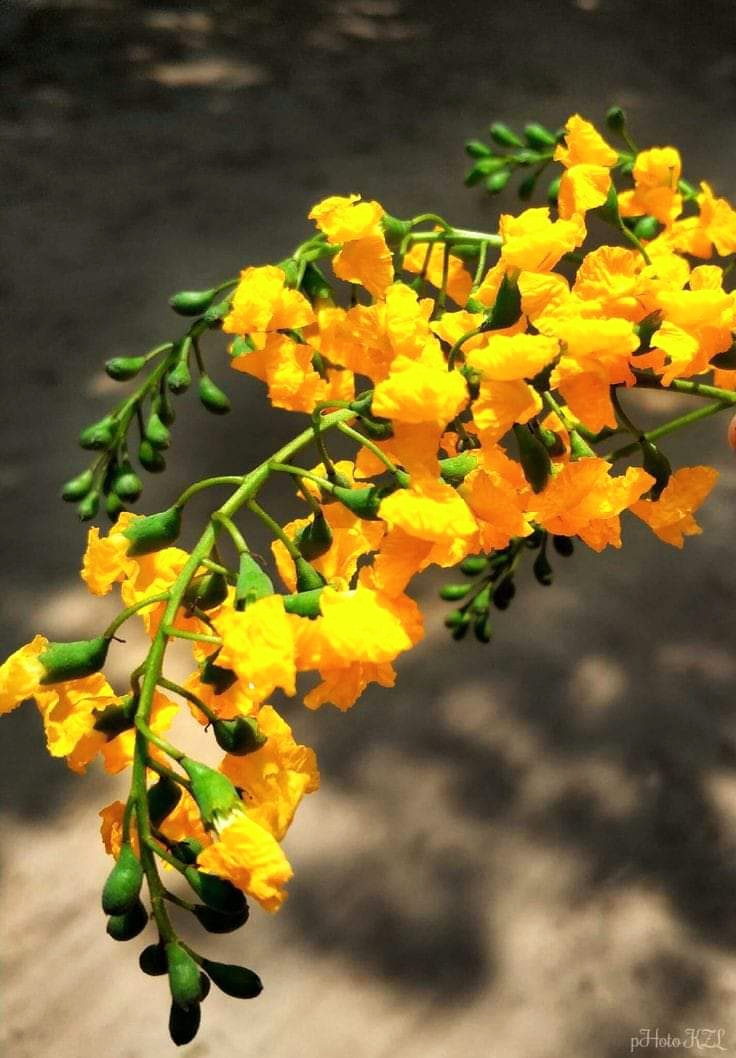
Typical season flowers, Burmese Padauks (Pterocarpus macrocarpus), flowering during Thingyan

Nightfall brings music, song and dance, and merrymaking in anticipation of the water festival. In neighbourhoods, pavilions with festive names constructed from bamboo, wood and beautifully decorated papier-mâché, are assembled overnight. Local girls rehearse for weeks and even years, in the run-up to the great event in song and dance in chorus lines. Each band of girls are uniformly dressed in colourful tops and skirts and wears garlands of flowers and tinsel. They wear fragrant thanaka - a paste of the ground bark of Murraya paniculata which acts as both sunblock and astringent - on their faces, and sweet-scented yellow padauk (Pterocarpus macrocarpus) blossoms in their hair. Padauk blooms only one day each year during Thingyan and is popularly known as the "Thingyan flower".

Large crowds of revellers, on foot, on bicycles and motorbikes, and in trucks, will do the rounds of all the mandat, some making their own music and most of the women wearing thanaka and padauk. Floats, decorated and lit up, also with festive names and carrying an orchestra as well as dozens of young men on each of them, will roam the streets stopping at every mandat exchanging songs specially written for the festival including Thingyan classics.

== Day 2: Descent ==
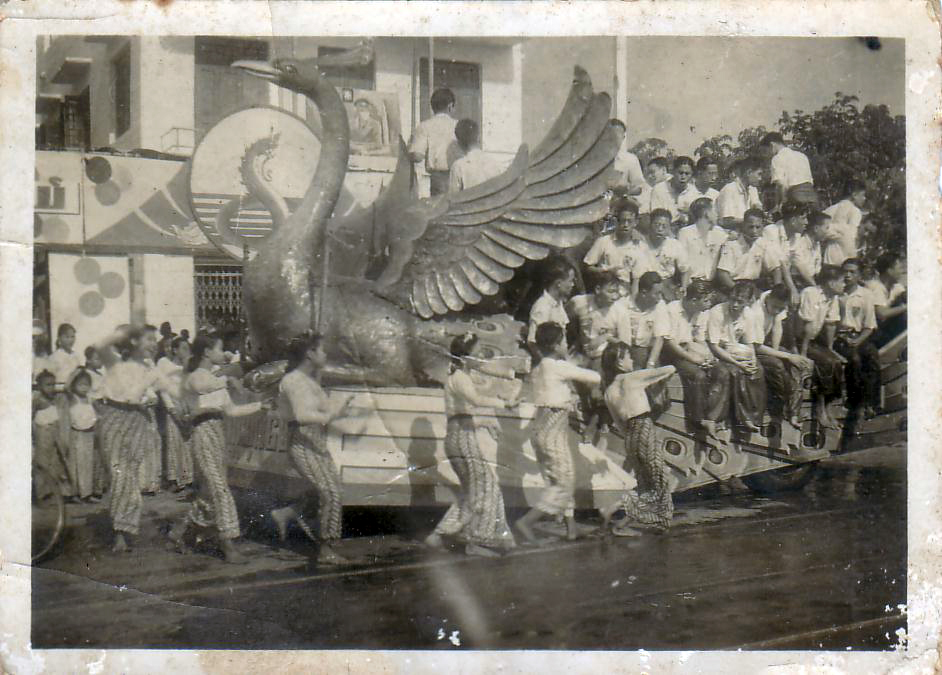
NāgaCheroots girls dancing round a float in 1950s Thingyan, Mandalay

The next day called "a-kya" (အကျနေ့, lit. 'day of descent') is when Thingyan fully arrives as Thagyamin makes his descent from his celestial abode to Earth. Children are told that if they have been good, Thagyamin will take their names down in a golden book but if they have been naughty their names will go into a dog book.

Serious water throwing does not begin until a-kya nei in most of the country although there are exceptions to the rule. Traditionally, Thingyan involved the sprinkling of scented water in a silver bowl using sprigs of thabyay (Jambul), a practice that continues to be prevalent in rural areas. The sprinkling of water was intended to metaphorically "wash away" one's sins of the previous year. In major cities such as Yangon, garden hoses, huge syringes made of bamboo, brass or plastic, water pistols and other devices from which water can be squirted are used in addition to the gentler bowls and cups. Water balloons and even fire hoses have been employed. It is the hottest time of the year in the country and a good dousing is welcomed by most. All able-bodied individuals are included in this game, except for monks. Some overenthusiastic young lads may get captured by women, who often are their main target, and become kids of a practical joke with soot from cooking pots smeared on their faces. Maidens from mandat's with dozens of garden hoses exchange hundreds of gallons of water with throngs of revellers and one floats after another. Many revellers carry towels to block water from getting into their ears and for modesty as they get thoroughly soaked in their light summer clothes. The odd prankster might use ice water and a drive-by splash with this would be taken humorously. Pwè (performances) by puppeteers, orchestras, yein dance troupes, comedians, film stars and singers including modern pop groups are commonplace during this festival.

== Days 3 and 4: Eclipse and ascent ==
The third day is known as "a-kyat" (အကြတ်နေ့, lit. 'day of eclipse'), a key part of the Thingyan festival when water-throwing is at its peak. In some years, there may be two a-kyat days instead of one, as an extra day is added based on traditional Myanmar lunisolar calendar calculations. This occurs to align the festival with the precise solar transition marking the New Year.

The fourth day is known as "a-tet" (အတက်နေ့, lit. 'day of ascent'), symbolizing the moment Thagyamin, the celestial king, returns to the heavens. It marks the final day of the water festival, and it is generally more calm and respectful. Traditionally, people stop throwing water and focus on merit-making, such as offering food to monks, releasing fish, and doing good deeds.

However, playfulness still lingers, and it's common to see people splashing water late into the day. Some jokingly say, "Thagyamin forgot his pipe and has come back for it!" (သိကြားမင်း ဆေးတံ မေ့ထားလို့ ပြန်လာတာ), keeping the fun spirit alive even as the festival draws to a close.

== Day 5: New Year's Day ==
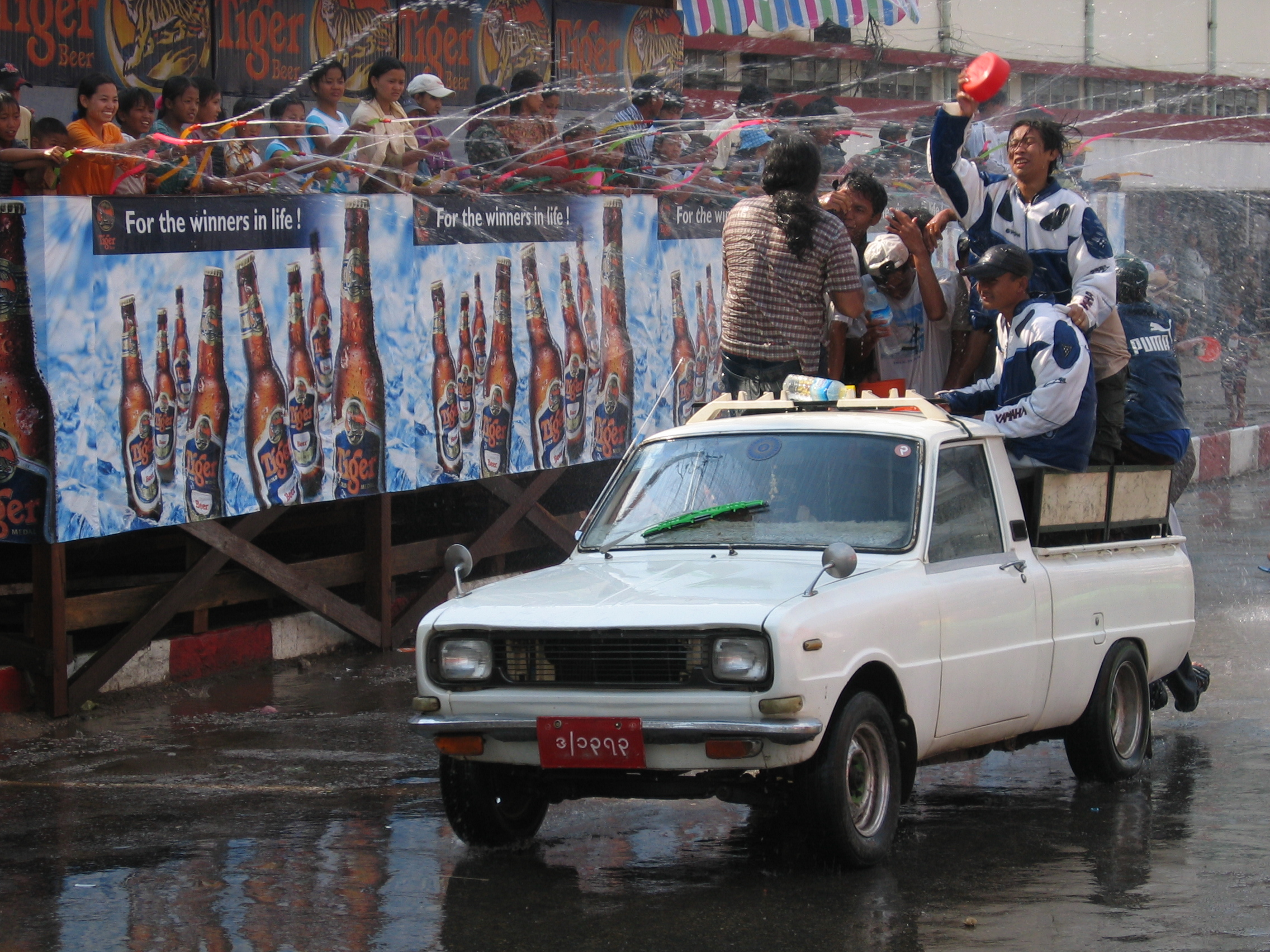
A pickup truck full of revelers is doused with water on the streets of Taunggyi, Shan State.

The following is New Year's Day (နှစ်ဆန်းတစ်ရက်နေ့, hnit hsan ta yet nei). At this time Burmese visit elders and pay obeisance by gadaw (also called shihko) with a traditional offering of water in a terracotta pot and shampoo. Young people perform hairwashing for the elderly often in the traditional manner with shampoo beans (Acacia rugata) and bark. New year's resolutions are made, generally in the mending of ways and doing meritorious deeds for their karma. Releasing fish (ငါးလွှတ်ပွဲ, nga hlut pwè) is another time-honoured tradition on this day; fish are rescued from lakes and rivers that are drying up, then the fish are kept in huge glazed earthen pots and jars before being released into larger lakes and rivers with a prayer and a wish saying "I release you once, you release me ten times". Thingyan (အခါတွင်း, a-hka dwin) is also a common time for shinbyu, novitiation ceremonies for boys in the tradition of Theravada Buddhism when they will join the monks (Sangha) and spend a short time in a monastery immersed in the teachings of the Buddha, the Dhamma. It is akin to rites of passage or coming of age ceremonies in other religions.

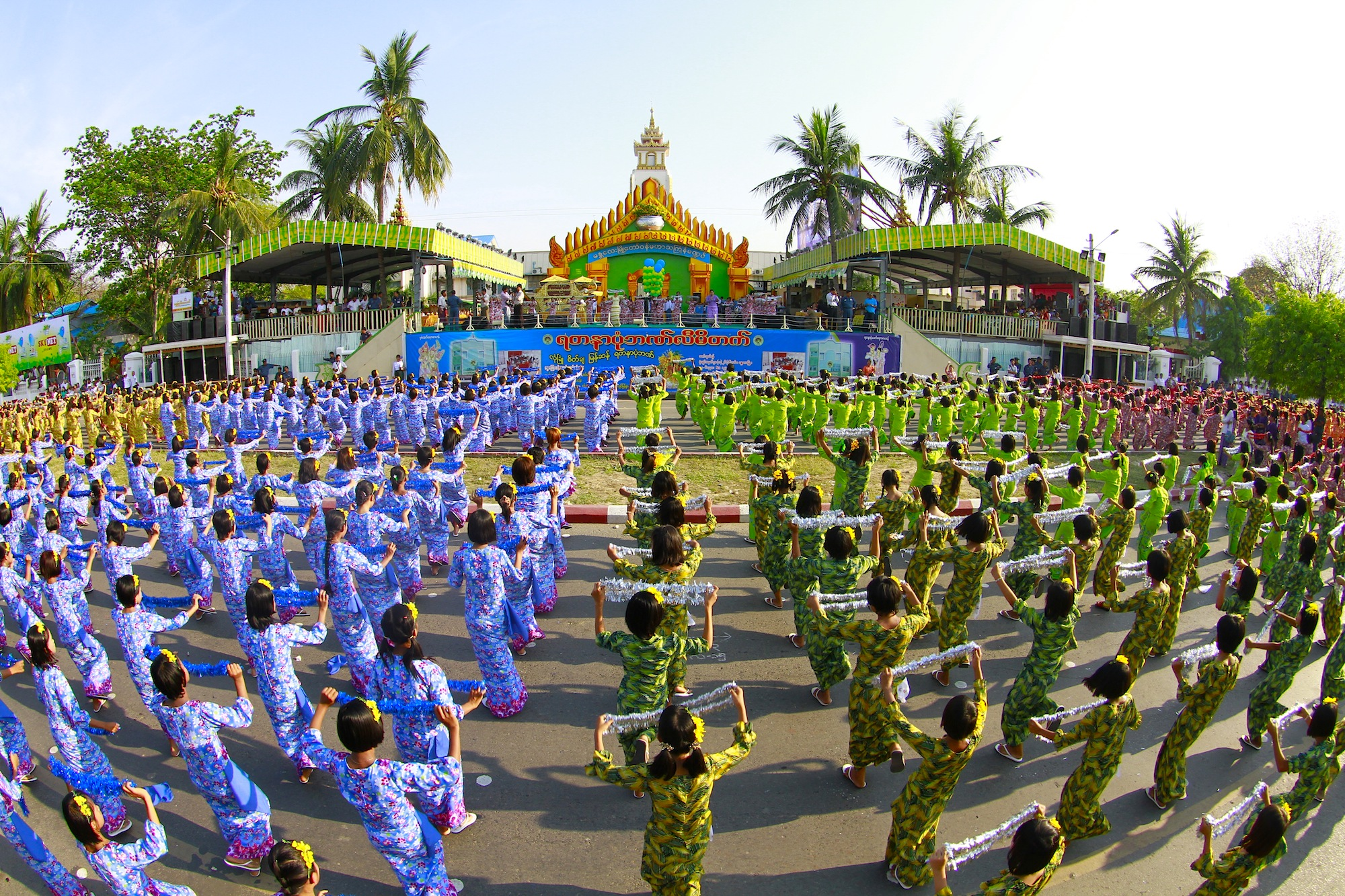
Burmese girls perform the Myanmar traditional yein dance with Myanmar dress in the opening ceremony of the Mandalay Thingyan Festival,2012.

On New Year's Day, people offer food donations called satuditha (စတုဒိသာ) at various places. They typically provide free food to those participating in the New Year's celebrations. Many Burmese wash their heads with Tayaw, kinpun on Burmese New Year's Day so as to leave behind all the impurities and bad omens from the past.

== Holiday customs ==
=== Almsgiving ===
During Thingyan, locals throughout the country organise almsgiving events called satuditha, which take the form of communal feasts, offering free food, meals, and drinks to passersby and the needy. These range from traditional dishes like Burmese curry and rice, mohinga, and ono khauk swe to desserts like shwe yin aye and mont let saung. These activities reinforce the cultural norm of generosity and social cohesion in Burmese society.

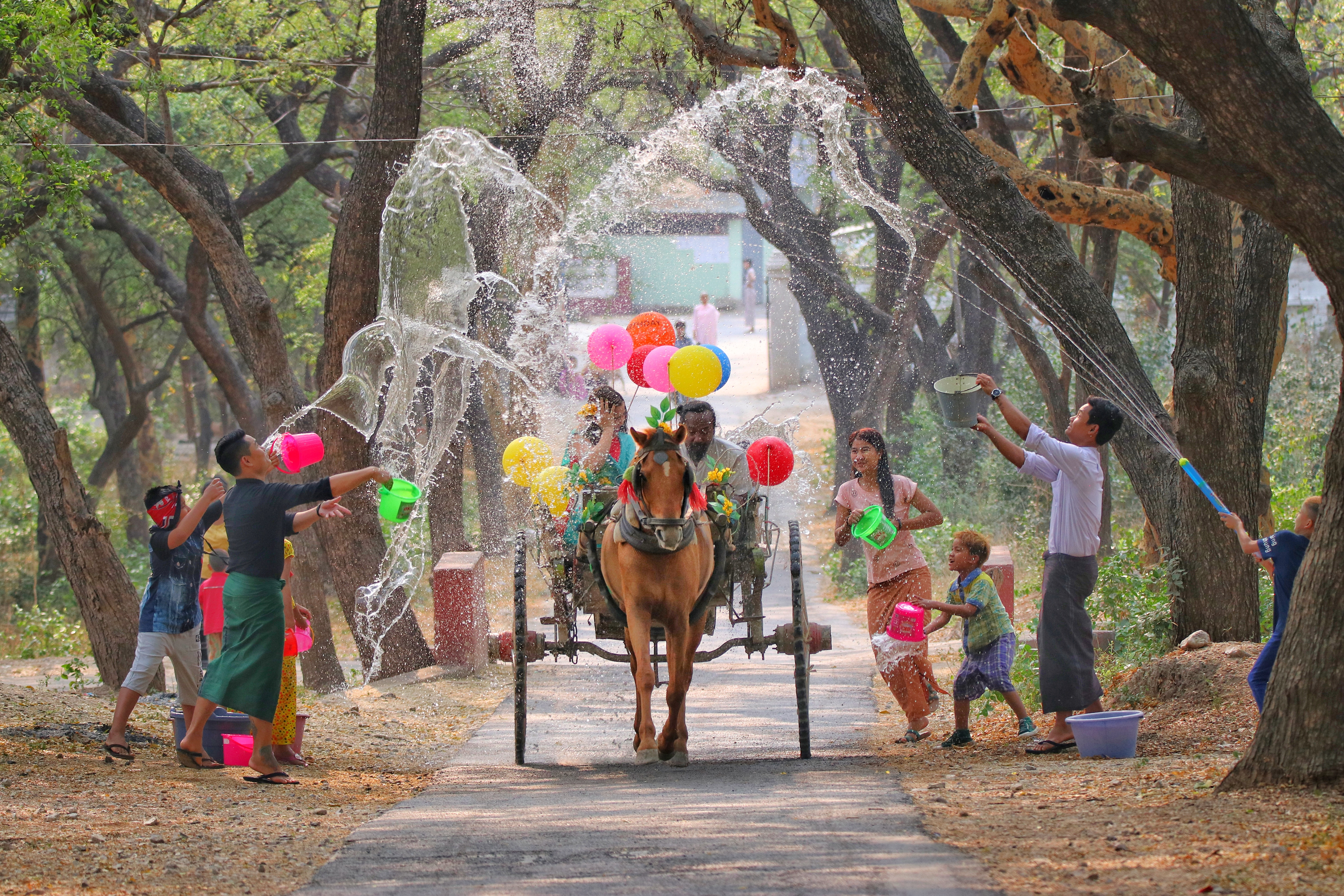
Water play in the countryside during Thingyan

=== Pandals ===
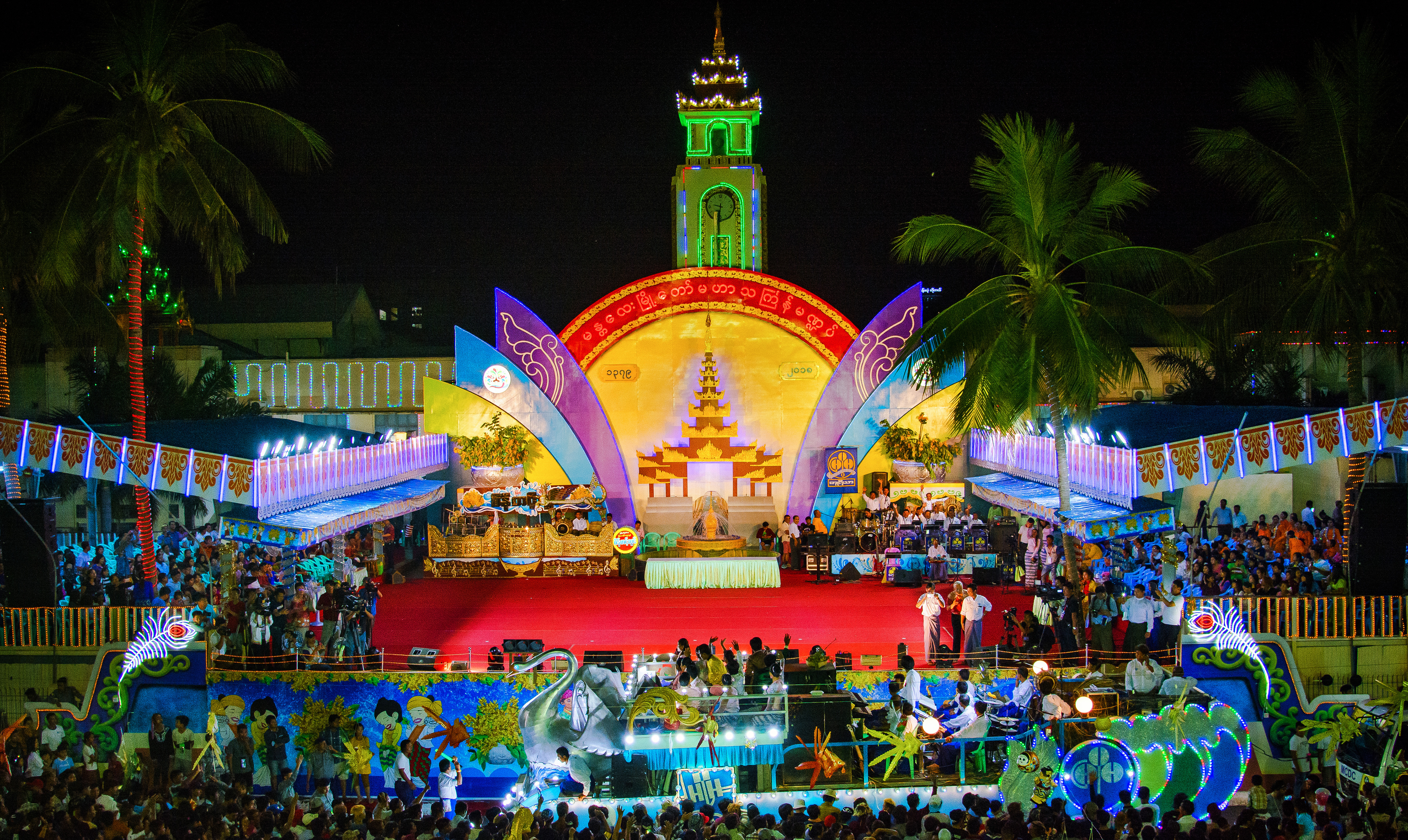
A pandal in front of Mandalay City Hall, 2018

During the Water Festival, the Myanmar government relaxed restrictions on gatherings. In the former capital, Yangon, the government permits crowds to gather on the Kandawgyi Roundabout and Kabaraye Roads. Temporary water-spraying stations, known as pandals, are set up and double as dance floors. Many of these pavilions are sponsored by rich and powerful families and businesses.

=== Food traditions ===
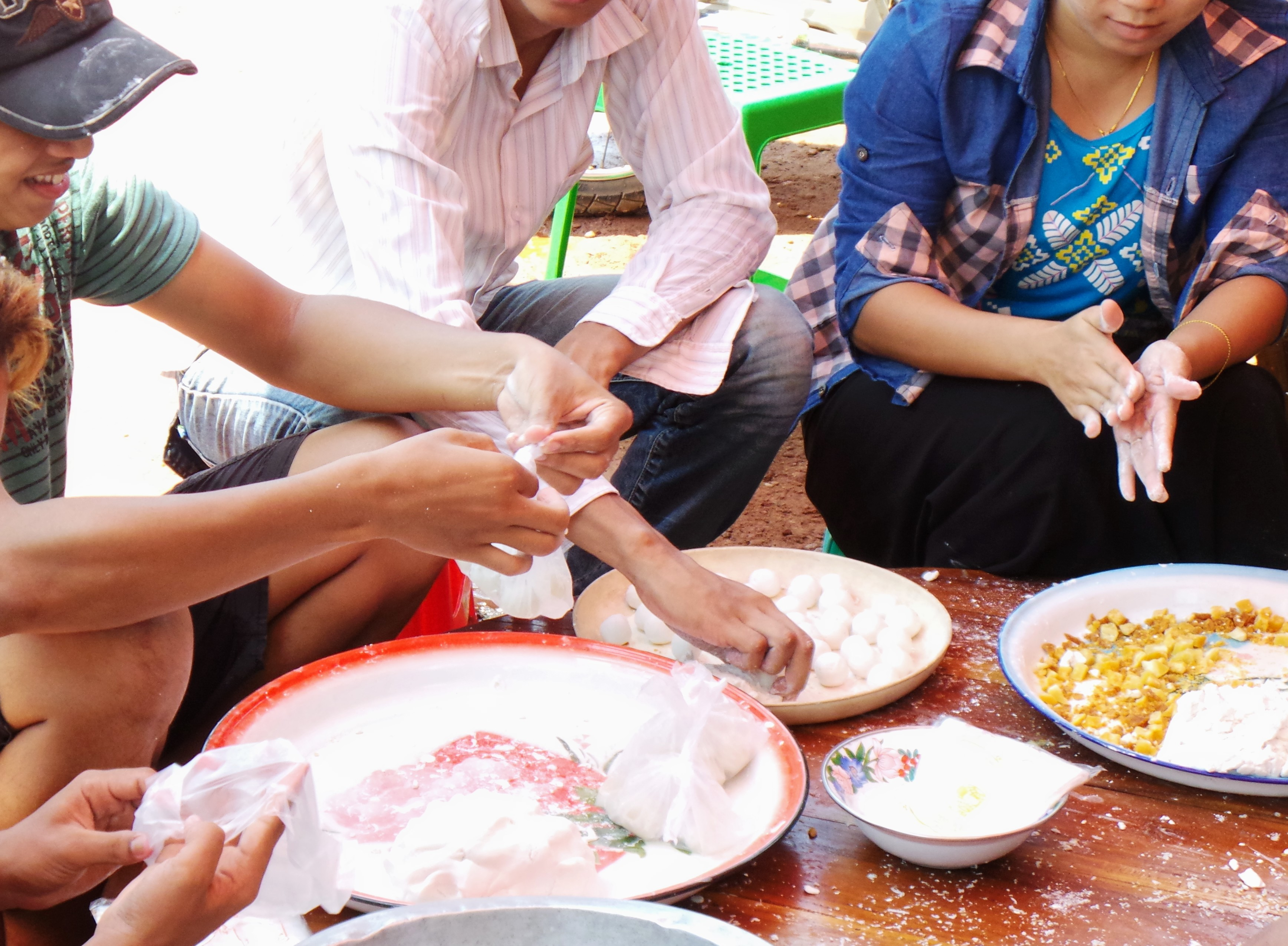
Revelers making mont lone yay baw

Over the long festive holiday, a time-honoured tradition is mont lone yay baw (မုန့်လုံးရေပေါ်), glutinous rice balls with jaggery (palm sugar) inside thrown into boiling water in a huge wok and served as soon as they resurface which gave it the name. Young men and women help in making it and all are welcome, some have put a birdseye chilli inside instead of jaggery as a trick. Mont let saung (မုန့်လက်ဆောင်း) is another Thingyan snack, made of bits of sticky rice with toasted sesame in jaggery syrup and coconut milk. They are both served with grated coconut.

=== Dance troupes ===
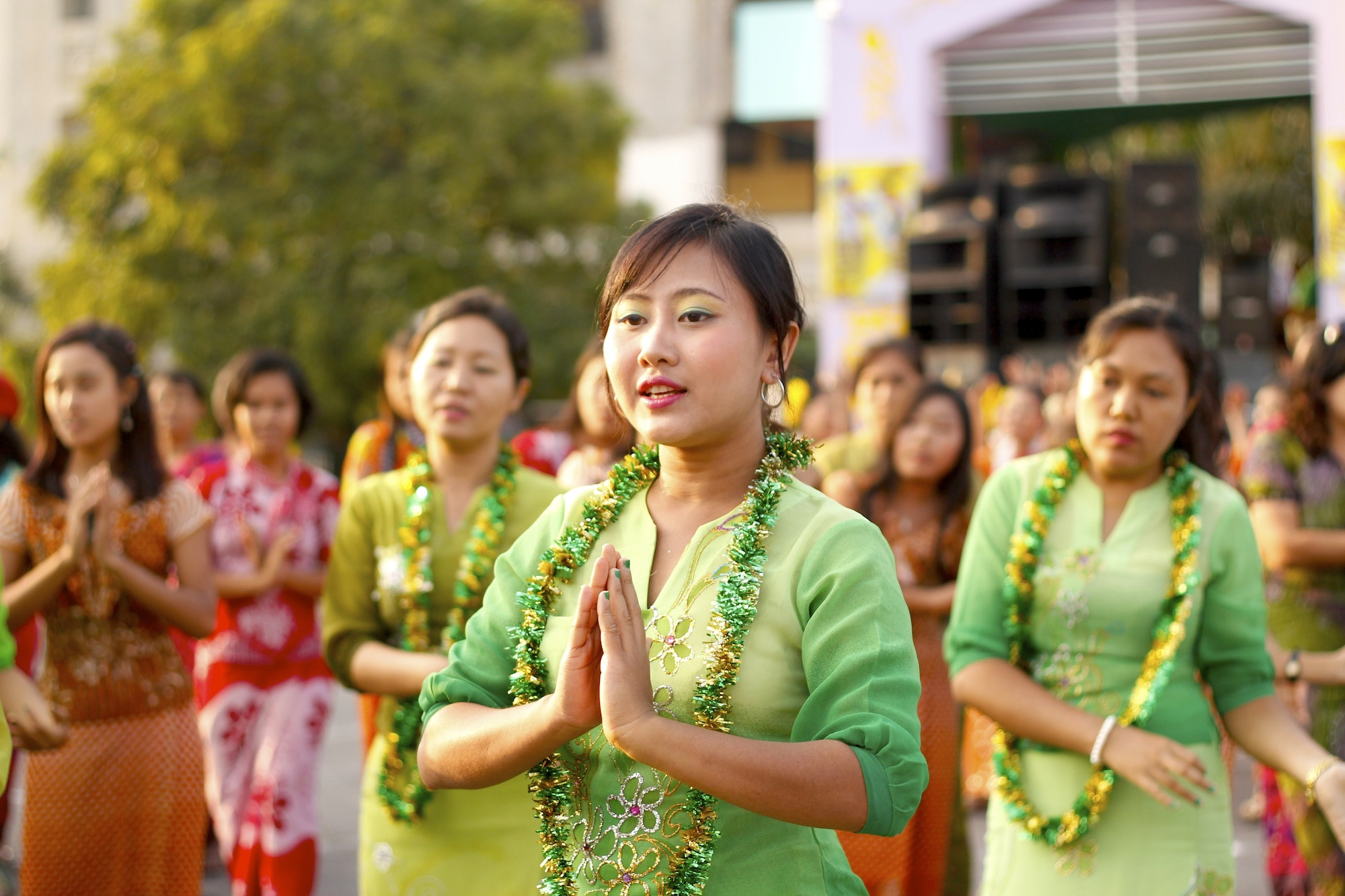
Burmese women perform traditional yein dance during closing ceremony of Myanmar New Year Water Festival 2011 in Yangon, Myanmar on 16 April 2011.

During Thingyan, dance troupes throughout the country perform synchronised group dances called yein. These dance styles originate in the Burmese folk music tradition, performed with songs featuring the beat of a double-headed drum called the dobat. Songs from the classic 1985 film Thingyan Moe are commonly featured.

=== Decorations ===
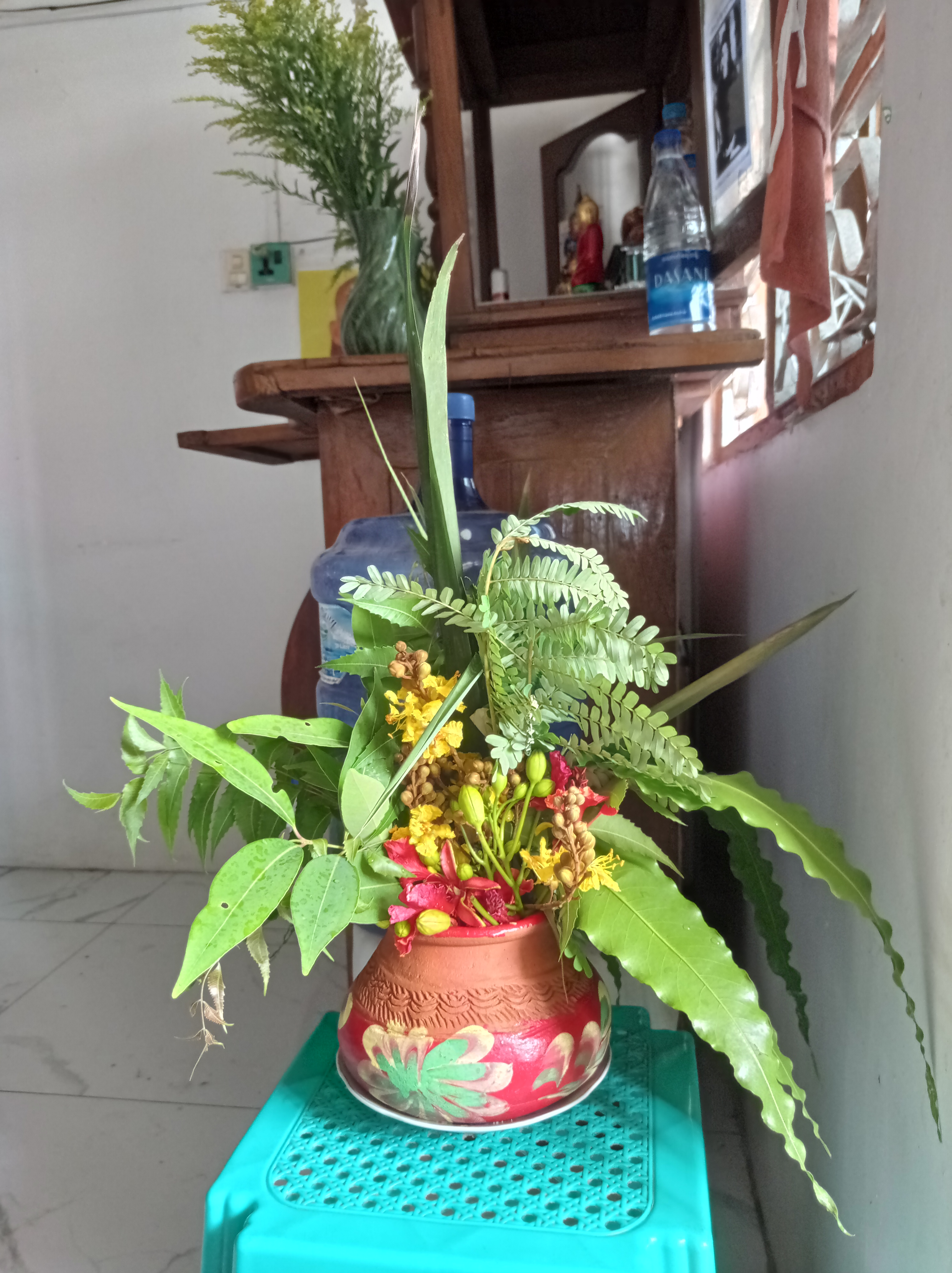
Atā oh, a ceremonial clay pot prepared for Thingyan

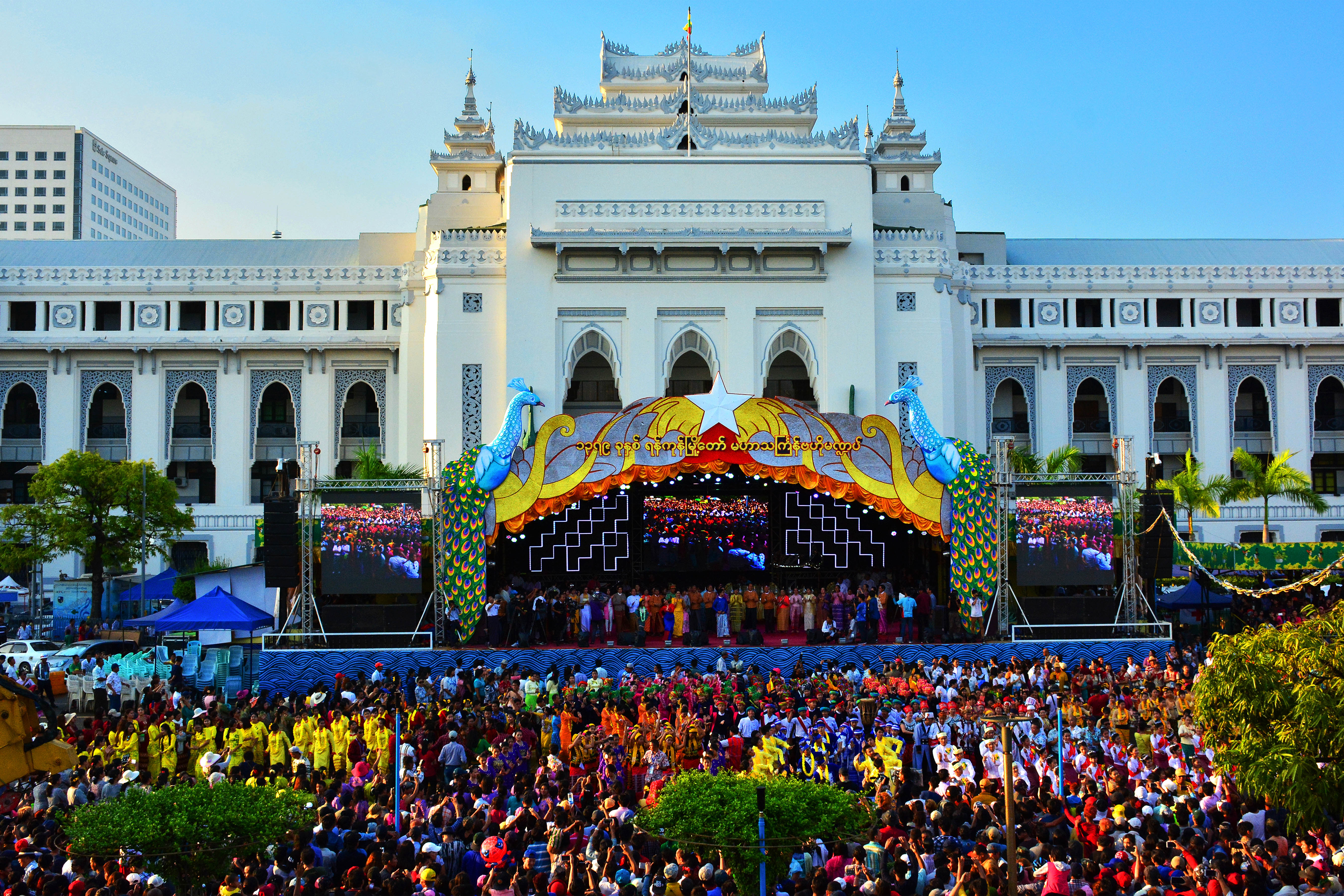
Thingyan pandal in front of Yangon City HallYangon in 2018.

In the lead-up to Thingyan, families prepare ceremonial clay pots called atā oh (အတာအိုး) to welcome Thagyamin. The pots are filled with sprigs and flowers from 7 types of plants to represent each day of the week:

Day of week	Flora
Sunday	coconut (အုန်းညွှန့်)
Monday	medlar (ခရေ), Mesua ferrea (ကံ့ကော်)
Tuesday	jujube (စီး), Delonix regia (စိန်ပန်း), Bauhinia acuminata (စွယ်တော်)
Wednesday	Indian neem (ရေတမာ)
Thursday	guava (မာလကာ)
Friday	Eugenia (သပြေ), cashews (သီဟိုဠ်)
Saturday	neem (တမာ), henna (ဒန်းပန်း)

=== Thangyat ===
Throughout the festival, troupes perform than gyat (similar to rapping but one man leads and the rest bellows at the top of their voices making fun of and criticising whatever is wrong in the country today such as fashion, consumerism, runaway inflation, crime, drugs, AIDS, corruption, inept politicians etc.).

== Global recognition ==
On 5 December 2024, Atā Thingyan Festival was inscribed on UNESCO's Representative List of the Intangible Cultural Heritage of Humanity, acknowledging its cultural significance and the collective efforts to preserve this vibrant tradition .

== Regional traditions ==
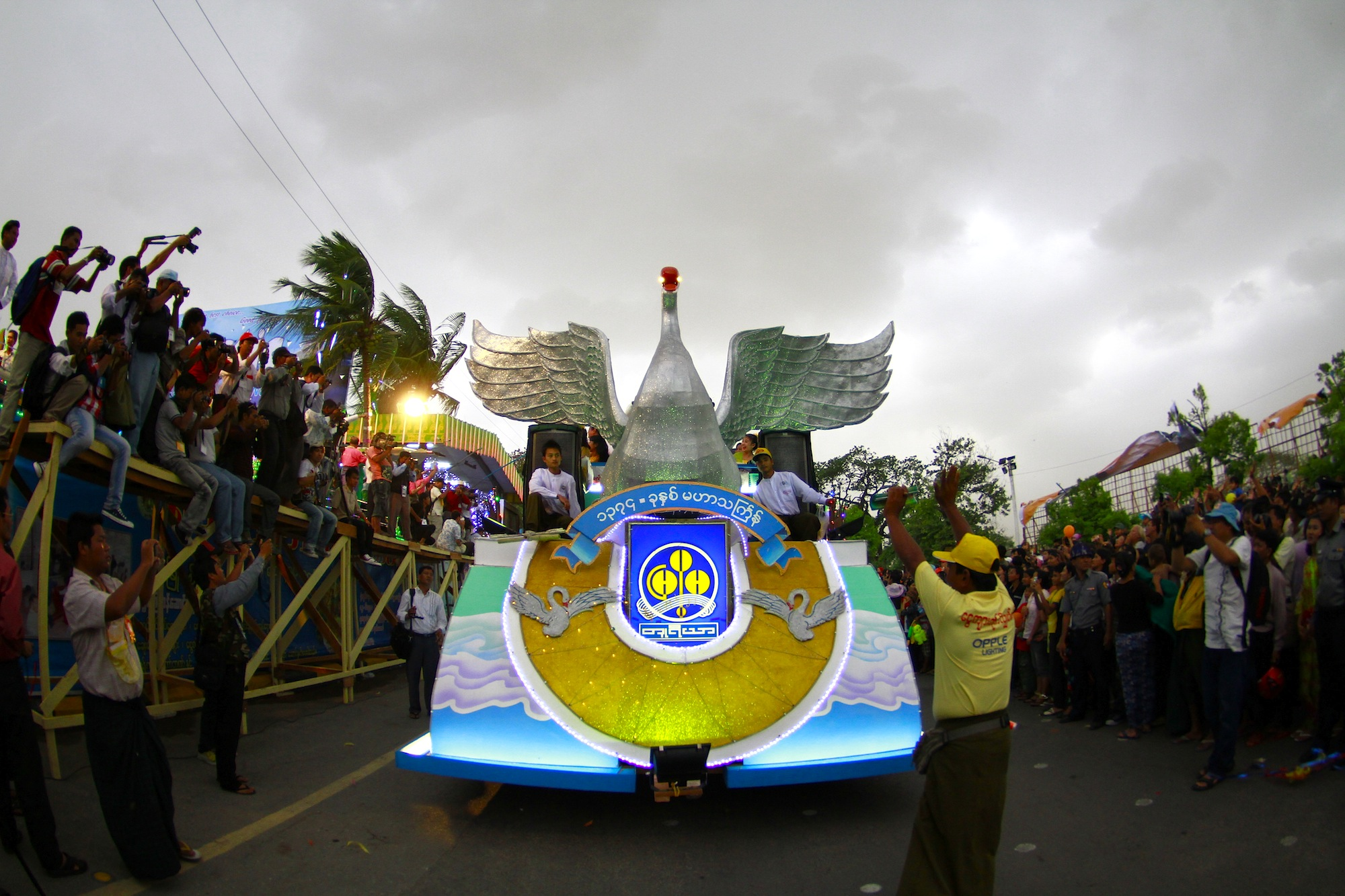
Mandalay legendary Thingyan float Myoma arrives to perform in front of Mandalay City Hall in Mandalay, Myanmar on 12 April 2012.

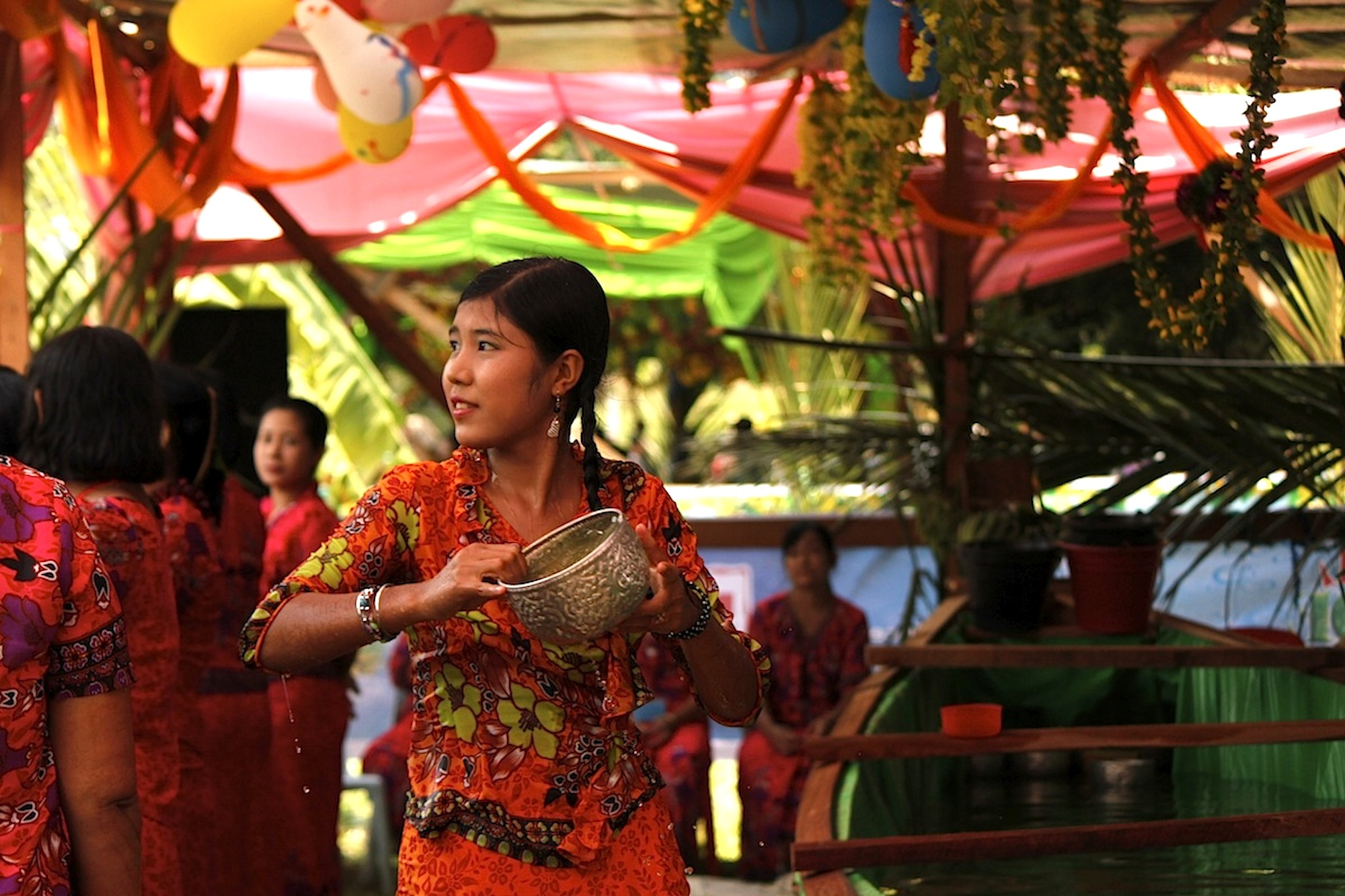
A Rakhine girl pours water at revelers during Thingyan in Yangon, 13 April 2011.

- Rakhine State - The Rakhine people have three unique customs that form Thingyan, namely the nantha grinding ceremony, the nantha pouring ceremony and the water festival. On the evening of New Year's Eve, Rakhine girls assemble to grind blocks of nantha sandalwood (used as a traditional cosmetic in Burma) on a kyaukpyin (a flat, circular stone used to grind sandalwood), as part of a competition. The following morning, the Rakhine visit monasteries and pagodas to offer the ground nantha to Buddha statues, as a gesture of ushering the new year. In the Rakhine tradition, water is scooped from a long boat (လောင်းလှေ, laung hlei) to throw at revellers and Rakhine mont di is served.
- Mon State - As part of Thingyan traditions, the Mon people offer a festive dish called Thingyan rice, which consists of rice, dried snakehead fish, a generous sprinkle of fried onions, a few flakes of beeswax and served alongside a salad of unripe green mangoes.
- Tanintharyi Region - The Bamar of Dawei and Myeik pay respects to elders and provide free meals to accompany Thaman Kyar dance performances.
- Shan State - The Shan people call Thingyan "Sangkyan" (သၢင်းၵျၢၼ်ႇ) and prepare a steamed sweetmeat called khaw mun haw (ၶဝ်ႈမုၼ်းႁေႃႇ), made of glutinous rice flour and jaggery, wrapped in banana leaf. This is offered to neighbors as a gift of goodwill.

== In popular culture ==
Several Burmese films have portrayed the Thingyan Festival, highlighting its cultural significance and festive spirit. Notable example include: Thingyan Moe (သင်္ကြန်မိုး, 1985) – A classic musical drama that follows the lives of young people during the festival. The film is well known for its songs and is considered a cultural touchstone of Thingyan.

== See also ==
- Water Festival
- List of Buddhist festivals
- South and Southeast Asian New Year
