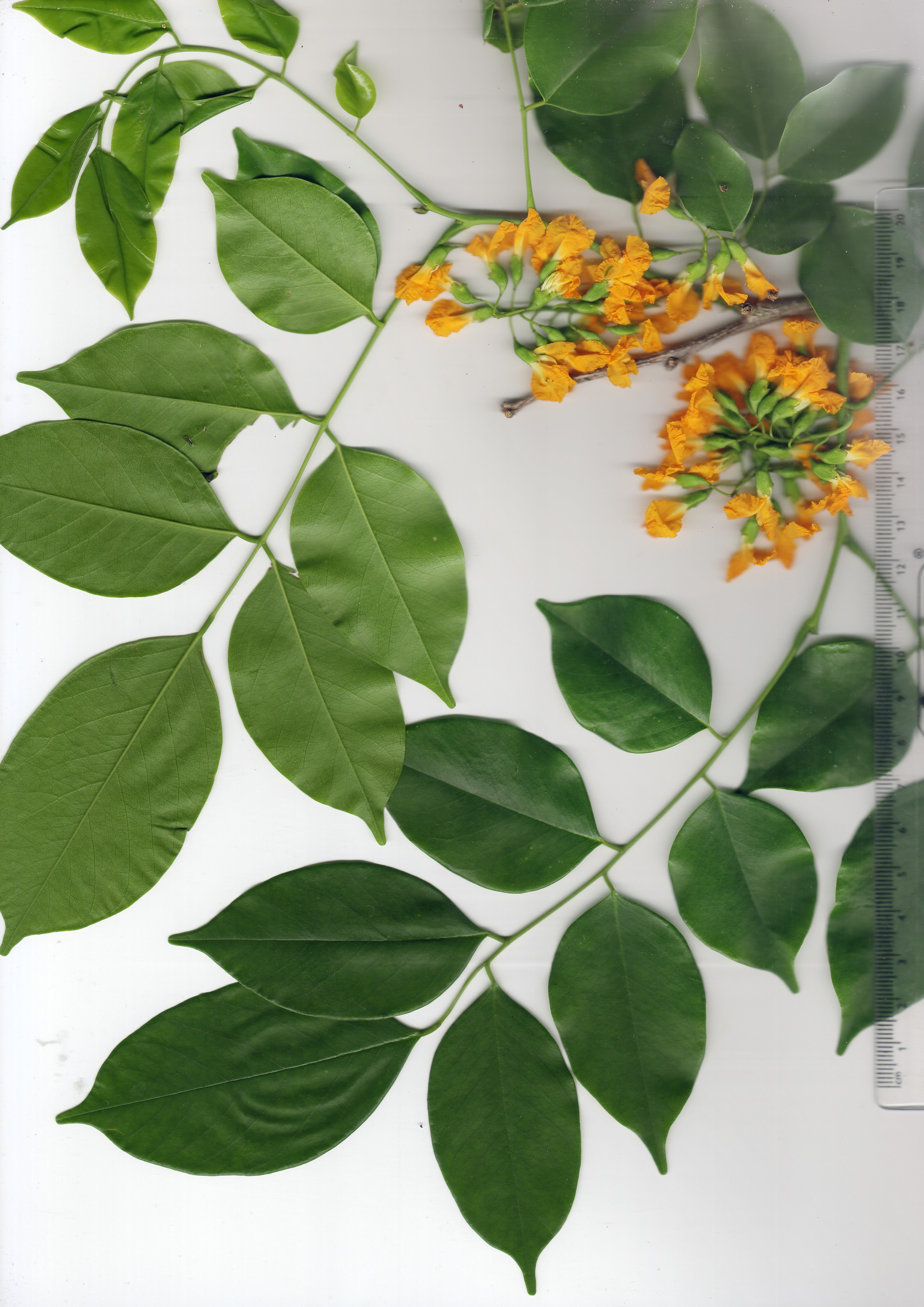
- Foliage and flowers of P. macrocarpus

Conservation status
- Endangered (IUCN 3.1)

Scientific classification
- Kingdom: Plantae
- Clade: Tracheophytes
- Clade: Angiosperms
- Clade: Eudicots
- Clade: Rosids
- Order: Fabales
- Family: Fabaceae
- Subfamily: Faboideae
- Genus: Pterocarpus
- Species: P. macrocarpus

Binomial name
- Pterocarpus macrocarpus Kurz

Synonyms
- List: Lingoum macrocarpum (Kurz) Kuntze; Lingoum cambodianum Pierre; Lingoum glaucinum Pierre; Lingoum gracile Pierre; Lingoum oblongum Pierre; Lingoum parvifolium Pierre; Lingoum pedatum Pierre; Pterocarpus cambodianus (Pierre) Dyer; Pterocarpus cambodianus var. calcicola Craib; Pterocarpus cambodianus var. glaucinus (Pierre) Gagnep.; Pterocarpus cambodianus var. gracilis (Pierre) Gagnep.; Pterocarpus cambodianus var. oblongus (Pierre) Gagnep.; Pterocarpus cambodianus var. parvifolius (Pierre) Gagnep.; Pterocarpus glaucinus (Pierre) Dyer; Pterocarpus gracilis (Pierre) Dyer; Pterocarpus gracilis var. brevipes Craib; Pterocarpus gracilis var. nitidus Craib; Pterocarpus macrocarpus var. oblongus (Pierre) Gagnep.; Pterocarpus oblongus (Pierre) Dyer; Pterocarpus parvifolius (Pierre) Dyer; Pterocarpus pedatus (Pierre) Dyer

= Pterocarpus macrocarpus =

Burma padauk

Species of tropical legume tree

Pterocarpus macrocarpus, commonly known as Burma padauk or Burmese padauk, is a species of tree in the family Fabaceae. It is an important timber tree and is celebrated as a national symbol in Myanmar.

== Description ==
Pterocarpus macrocarpus is a medium-sized tree growing to 10–30 m (rarely to 39 m) tall, with a trunk up to 1.7 m diameter; it is deciduous in the dry season. The bark is flaky, grey-brown; if cut, it secretes a red gum. The leaves are 200–350 mm long, pinnate, with 9–11 leaflets. The flowers are yellow, produced in racemes 50–90 mm long. The fruit is a pod surrounded by a round wing 45–70 mm diameter, containing two or three seeds.

The wood is durable and resistant to termites; it is important, used for furniture, construction timber, cart wheels, tool handles, and posts; though not a true rosewood it is sometimes traded as such. The seasonal padauk flowers bloom annually around Thingyan (April) and is considered one of the national symbols of Myanmar (formerly Burma).

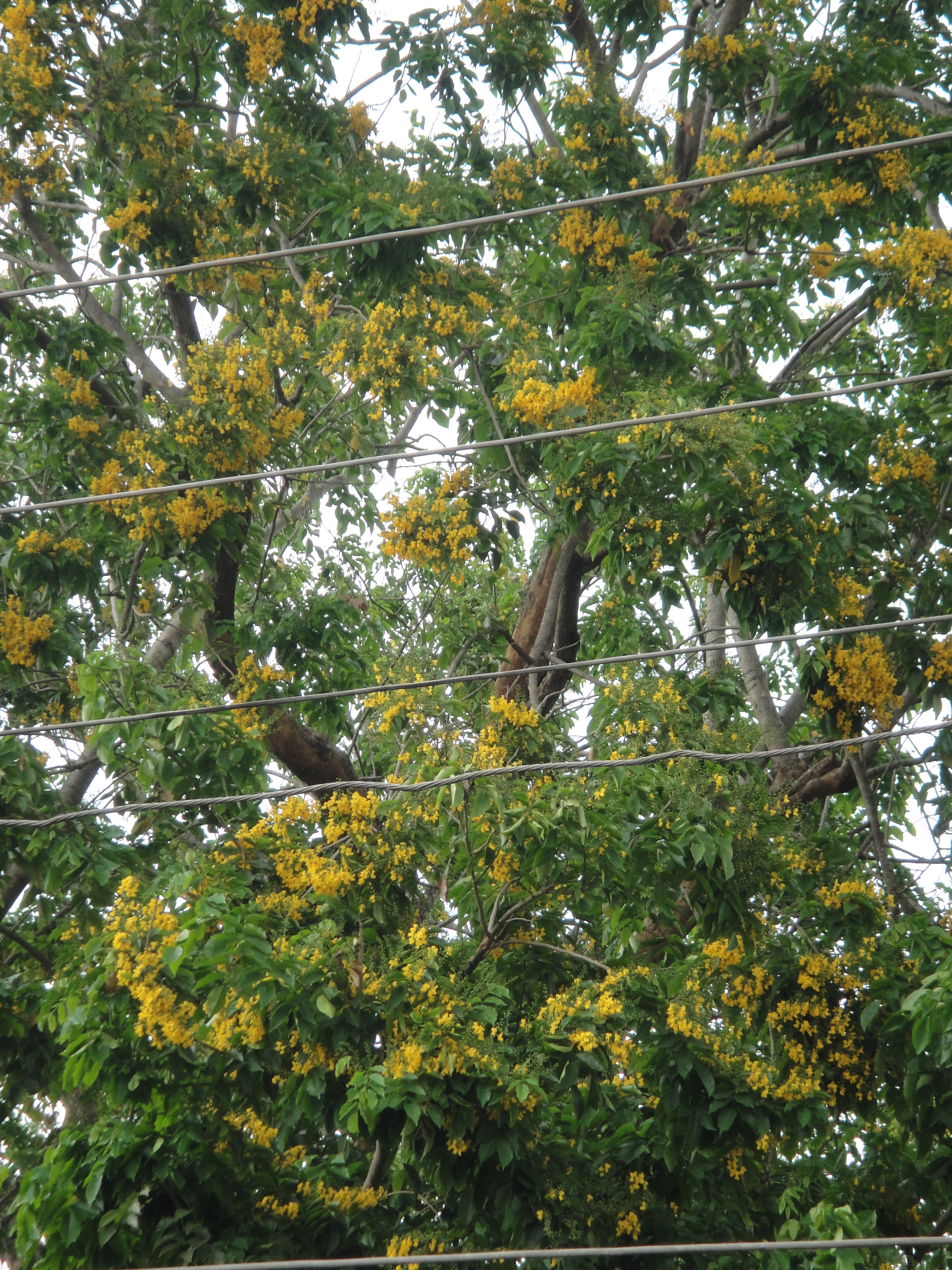
Padauk flowers during Thingyan

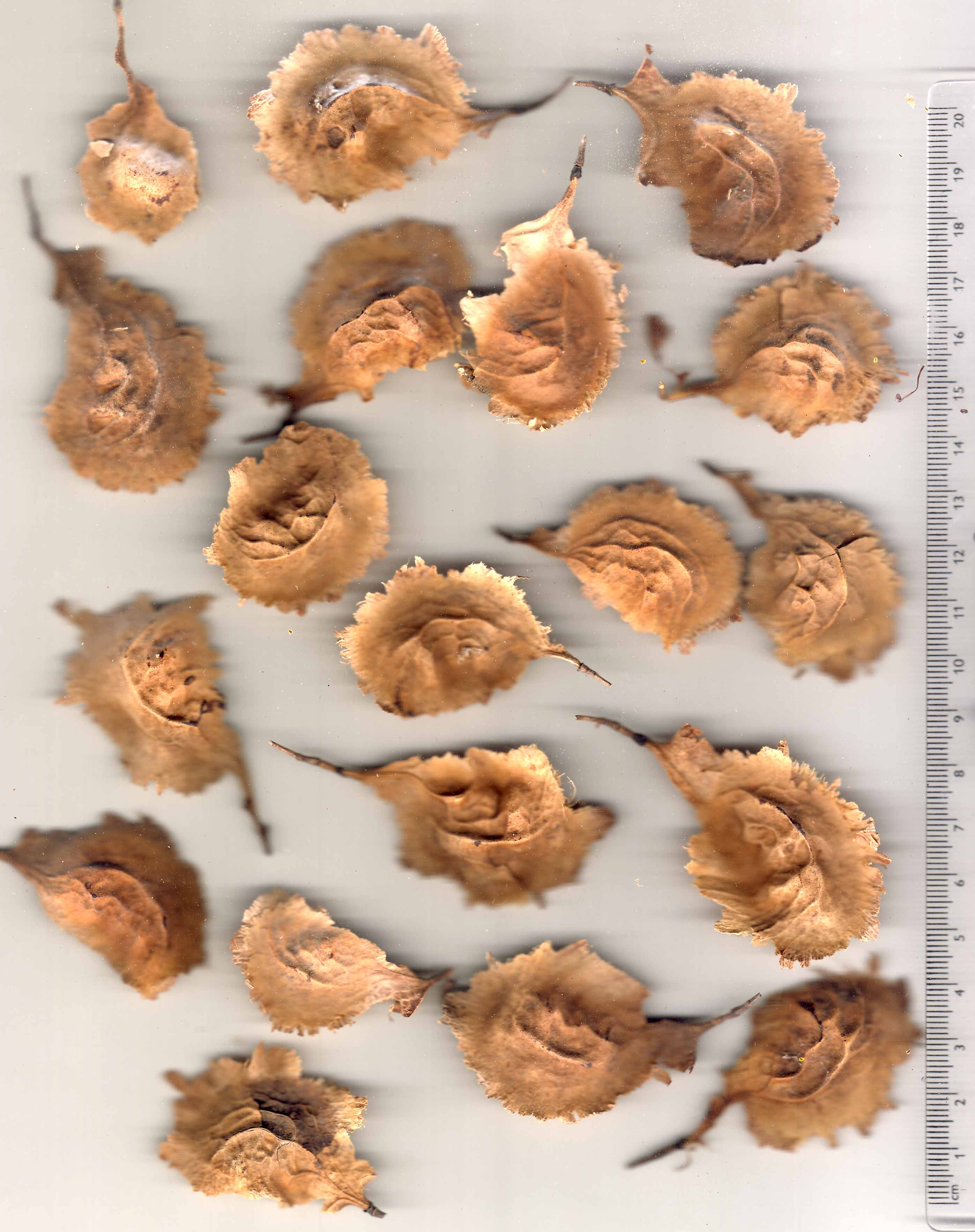
Padauk seeds

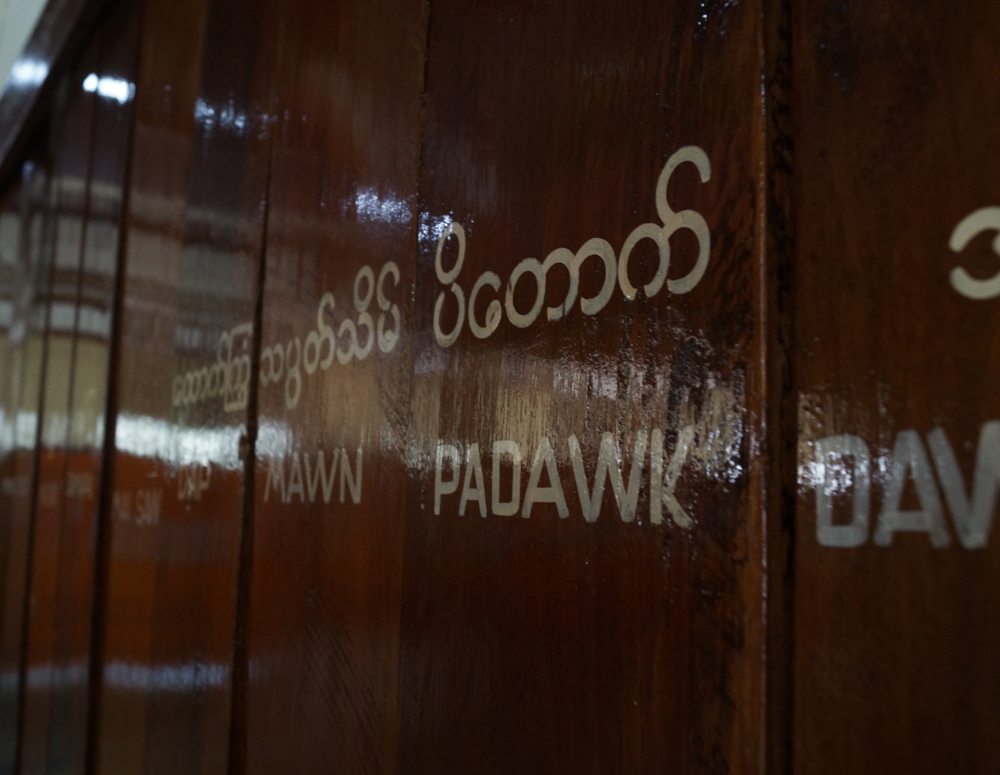
Displayed Padauk wood

== Distribution and habitat ==
The species is native to the seasonal tropical forests of mainland Southeast Asia, including Myanmar, Thailand, Laos, Cambodia, and Vietnam. It has been naturalized in parts of India and the Caribbean. It typically grows in dry deciduous forests, often associated with teak and bamboo.

== Uses ==
The timber is very durable and resistant to termites. It is heavy, hard, and has a fine-grained, reddish-brown appearance. It is highly valued for high-end furniture, flooring, tool handles, and traditional musical instruments. Padauk is often traded as "Amboyna wood" when it features burls.

== Culture ==
In Myanmar, the padauk flower is a national symbol and is closely associated with the Thingyan (Burmese New Year) festival. The flowers typically bloom once a year in April after the first spring rains. It is regarded as a symbol of strength and durability.

== Status ==
The species is currently listed as Endangered on the IUCN Red List due to over-exploitation for its timber and habitat loss across its native range.
