= Zaw One =

Burmese actor

- ဇော်ဝမ်း
- Born: Thaung Dan; 17 July 1945; Mandalay, British Burma
- Died: 12 August 2009 (aged 64); Yangon, Myanmar
- Occupations: Actor; singer
- Spouses: Sein Sein; Thant Shwe Zin Win
- Parent(s): Mya Mya, Taingchit Thakin Thein Pe

Zaw One (Burmese: ဇော်ဝမ်း; IPA: [zɔ̀ wáɰ̃]; born Thaung Dan; 17 July 1945 – 12 August 2009) was a Burmese actor and singer. He was famous as Thingyan Minthar Gyi in Myanmar.

== Biography ==
Zaw One was born Thaung Dan on 17 July 1945, in Mandalay, son of Mya Mya and "Taingchit" Thakin Thein Pe. He attended Taingchit High School in Mandalay. He received singing lessons from Bo Kin, founder of the Moe Kaythi Amateur Band, and later sang with the band. He then studied acting with Shumawa U Kyaw, a famous director. Zaw One made many films. His first role was in Chwe Ka Lay So So, directed by Shumawa U Kyaw. The film Say Lo Yar Say made him famous. He was particularly famous for the film Thingyan Moe. He also made a few albums as a singer.

He died on 12 August 2009, from liver disease in Yangon. He was survived by his wife Thant Shwe Zin Win, four children, and nine grandchildren.

== Filmography ==
- Chwe Ka Lay So So
- Say Lo Yar Say
- Thingyan Moe
- Lu Ma Naw
- Nay Htut Taw Nya
- Ta Kha Ga Ta Bawa
- Myitta Bon Tho Nit Khaund
- Kyauntaw Nit Ko Ba Kyaw
- Doe Nit Youk Nit Mi Nyein Chan
- Bal Thu Pyaing Lo Hla Par Taw Naing
- Kyaw Go Chit Ma La, Zaw Go Chit Ma La
- Ngwe Yupa
- Hot Shot (2)
- Hot Shot (3)
