= Thingyan Moe =

- Burmese film poster for Thingyan Moe.
- သင်္ကြန်မိုး
- Directed by: Maung Tin Oo
- Written by: Khin Maung Aye (novel); Aung Soe Oo (screenplay)
- Produced by: Maung Sein Ngwe
- Starring: Nay Aung; Zin Wine; Khin Than Nu; May Than Nu; Zaw One
- Cinematography: Chit Min Lu
- Edited by: Myint Khine (Maung Thitsar)
- Music by: Zaw Myo Htut
- Production company: Thuriya Pyinnya Films
- Release date: 1985
- Running time: 126 minutes
- Country: Myanmar
- Language: Burmese

Thingyan Moe (Burmese: သင်္ကြန်မိုး, English: Rain in the Water Festival) is a 1985 Burmese film directed by Maung Tin Oo and starring Nay Aung, Zin Wine, Khin Than Nu and May Than Nu. The movie follows the life of a musician from 1959 to 1982, with many of the scenes set at traditional Thingyan celebrations.

== Plot ==
The story follows Nyein Maung, a poor pianist, and Khin Khin Htar, a wealthy teenage girl from Mandalay, who falls deeply in love. Htar urges Nyein Maung to elope with her, but along the way, he prioritizes helping Mya Khet take her ailing mother to the hospital. In his absence, Htar is taken back by her mother and forced into an arranged marriage.

On her wedding day, Htar requests Nyein Maung to play the song Hna Ko To Chit Tha Hmya during the ceremony. Heartbroken, Nyein Maung drowns his sorrows in alcohol, falls asleep, and dreams of Htar giving him money. Misunderstanding the situation, he believes Htar left him for wealth.

Months later, Nyein Maung marries Mya Khet, and the story transitions into a vibrant studio musical with a Thingyan theme. Tragedy strikes when Mya Khet dies after giving birth to their son, Thet Htwe. With the help of a close friend, Nyein Maung raises his son, who, under his father's training, grows up to become a talented pianist.

== Cast ==
- Nay Aung as Nyein Maung
- Zin Wine as Thet Htwe
- Khin Than Nu as Khin Khin Htar
- May Than Nu as Nwe Nwe
- Thida Theint as Mya Khet
- May Thit as Uncredited/ Mya Khet's Sickly Mother
- Khin Soe Paing as Uncredited/ Mya Khet's friend
- Zaw One as Ko Latt
- Nyi Nyi Swe as Nyi Nyi/ Nyein Maung's Friend
- Ye Min as Khin Maung Win
- May Ywet Wah as Wah Wah / Nwe Nwe's friend
- Lin Aung as Maung Maung Gyi
- Mi Mi Khine as Mi Mi/ Khin Khin Htar's friend
- Khin Ohn Myint as Daw Htar Ei/ Khin Khin Htar's mother
- Aye Aye Myat as Mi Aye
- U Hla Maung as Maung Hla
- Tin Su Su Htwe as Baby Thet Htwe
- Thaw Tar Lin as Teen Thet Htwe
- Mandalay Citizen.

== Shooting and overview ==
The film was produced by Yee Myint Film Production and won the Thurya Pya Film Award at the Filmfare Awards. Yee Myint Films had to buy films from the government in the name of licensed film companies because it was not possible to buy foreign films due to the government's economic policy at the time.

The filming took place at the Ye Myint Film Building in Mandalay's Sai Tan Ward and at Dr. Thein Aung Temple in Pwe Kone, and the piano was filmed inside Nyein Maung's house at Sein Maung Studio in Rangoon.

The words "Kyawan Taw of the women" in the film were censored.

== Awards ==
1985
Myanmar Motion Picture Academy Awards

- Best Picture : Thuriya Pyinnya Films
- Best Director : Maung Tin Oo
- Best Cinematography : Chit Min Lu
