= Nay Aung =

Burmese actor

- နေအောင်
- Born: 1950 (age 75–76); Myanmar
- Occupation: Actor
- Awards: Myanmar Academy Award (1983, 1985, 2001)

Nay Aung (Burmese: နေအောင်) is a three-time Myanmar Academy Award winning film actor in Myanmar . He gained popularity after starring in the film Thingyan Moe(Rain in the Water Festival) .

== Awards and nominations ==
Year	Award	Category	Nominated work	Result
1983	Myanmar Motion Picture Academy Awards	Best Actor in a Supporting Role	Milashika Ka Sai Veda	Won
1985	Myanmar Motion Picture Academy Awards	Best Actor in a Leading Role	Pan Se Ta Kyao	Won
2001	Myanmar Motion Picture Academy Awards	Best Actor in a Supporting Role	Good Hearted-Stupid Person	Won
