= Kutho =

Kutho (Burmese: ကုသိုလ်; born Myint Thein) was a well known Burmese director and comedian, active from 1990s to 2010s. He started as a comedian at anyeints before becoming a director in show business. He shot a video in which reputed actor Dwe impersonated as a woman. He opened a food shop when the show business was declined later. Other contemporary comedians were Po Phyu, Kyaw Htoo, Kin Kaung, Myittar and Zaganar.

His son, Ponna Kutho, is also in film business.

== Dead ==
He died at Aung Yadanar Hospital in Yangon on 15 June 2014 at the age of 61.
