= Cinema of Myanmar =

Cinema of Myanmar (Burma)
- No. of screens: 124 (2009)
  - Per capita: 0.3 per 100,000 (2009)

Produced feature films (2009)
- Fictional: 27
- Animated: -
- Documentary: -

The cinema of Myanmar (Burma) dates to the 1910s. The person who created the first silent film was Ohn Maung (Burma's first producer and director).

== Start of the Burmese cinema ==
The Victoria Parsi Theatrical Company screened movies in Rangoon as early as 1898. Carl Hertz also showcased his variety shows along with a 'cinematographie' in Rangoon and Mandalay while touring the world. Burma was also on the tour map of Abdulally Esoofally's (originally Abdul Ali Yusuf Ali) 'Royal Bioscope' tent. Cultural historian Jane M. Ferguson notes, 'Changing technology and expanding consumer demand inspired entrepreneurs to build more permanent homes for this new popular entertainment.' Thus began the construction of the first brick-and-mortar cinema halls in Rangoon. The first multiple-reel feature film screened in 1911.

Burma's first film was a recording of the funeral of Tun Shein, a leading politician of the 1910s who campaigned for Burmese independence in London. Ohn Maung captured his funeral with a second-hand camera. The movie was screened at the Royal Cinema (near Scott Market, now Bogyoke Market) which belonged to a Mr Achar, a friend of Ohn Maung. Despite its documentary nature, the Burmese public was very proud of the film, which opened with the notice "Please accept our apologies for the poor quality of the film".

Ohn Maung then founded The Burma Film Company to produce and direct more films. He hired Nyi Pu (Burma's first actor) to shoot the first Burmese silent film Myitta Ne Thuya (Love and Liquor), which was a major success despite its poor quality due to a fixed camera position and inadequate film accessories. The film opened with the title "Burma Film Presents: Love and Liquor" but there were no credits or mention of the cast. It was based on a story by P Moe Nin about how gambling and alcohol destroyed a man's life. The day the film premiered, 13 October 1920, is commemorated annually as Myanmar Movie Day.

Fox of America asked for Burmese nature study scenes and bought them from Ohn Maung. He also acquired more advanced film accessories and camera from the Kodak Company.

During the 1920s and 1930s, many Burmese-owned film companies (such as A1, New Burma, British Burma, The Imperial, Bandula and Yan Gyi Aung) made and produced several films. Some of the famous directors of this era were Nyi Pu, Sunny, Tote Kyi, and Tin Pe.

The first Burmese sound film was produced in 1932 in Bombay, India with the title Ngwe Pay Lo Ma Ya (Money Can't Buy It) and directed by Tote Kyi. Films dealing with social issues and political themes became popular in the 1930s. Parrot Film Company produced films that addressed social issues such as gambling and police corruption, although they were censored by the British colonial government. There were also films that were banned like Do Daung Lan (Our Peacock Flag) in 1936 and Aung Thabyay (The Triumphant Jambul) in 1937. The political film Boycott was directed by the student leader Ko Nu in 1937 and starred other student leaders such as Aung San and Htun Ohn. The censors allowed this film to be shown.

Many of the films from this era no longer exist due to the lack of adequate preservation.

== Cold War era ==
After World War II, Burmese cinema continued to address political themes. Many of the films produced in the early Cold War era had a strong propaganda element. The film Palè Myetyay (Tear of Pearl), produced in the wake of the Kuomintang invasion of Burma in the 1950s, highlighted the importance of the armed forces or Tatmadaw to the country. Ludu Aung Than (The People Win Through) featured anti-Communist propaganda. The script was by U Nu, who served as Prime Minister during the 1950s.

The filmmaker and author Thukha started producing films during this period. His most famous film is Bawa Thanthaya (The Life Cycle). Burma held its first Academy Awards in 1952. Starting with the Socialist era in 1962, there was strict censorship and control of film scripts.

== Recent history ==
Since the political events of 1988, the film industry has been increasingly controlled by the government. After the 1989 move by the government to open up the economy, the movie industry was privatised. The film company Mingala became the most powerful company in the industry. Film stars who had been involved in the political activities of the 1980s and 1990s, such as Aung Lwin and Tun Wai, were banned from appearing in films. The films of some directors such as Win Pe have also been banned. The government issues strict rules on censorship and largely determines who produces films, as well as who gets academy awards.

Over the years, the movie industry has also shifted to producing many lower budget direct-to-video films.

Most of the movies produced nowadays are comedies. In 2008, only 12 films worthy of being considered for an Academy Award were made, although at least 800 VCDs were produced.

Another issue plaguing Burmese cinema is a steep decline in the number of theatres in which to screen films. According to a 2011 survey, the number of theatres nationwide had declined to just 71 from a peak of 244. The survey also found that most were several-decade-old ageing theatres, and that only six "mini-theaters" had been built in 2009–2011. Moreover, the vast majority of the theatres were in Yangon and Mandalay alone.

In the 21st century, Myanmar cinema got visibility in international film festivals. In 2014, The Maw Naing's The Monk premiered at the 49th Karlovy Vary International Film Festival. Wera Aung's short film The Robe screened at the 21st Busan International Film Festival, Aung Phyoe's Cobalt Blue at the 72nd Locarno Film Festival, and Maung Sun's Money Has Four Legs at the 74th Locarno Film Festival.

In 2019, some local media reported a revival in the local movie industry, stating that in 2016 there were 12 movies cleared by local censorship and waiting to be screened, 18 in 2017, more than 40 in 2018, and more than 60 in 2019. The success of Now and Ever (2019), starring Zenn Kyi, was also cited as evidence of the revival. According to The Myanmar Times, the most successful Myanmar movie in 2019 was The Only Mom, directed in Myanmar by Thai director Chartchai Ketnust, starring Burmese actress Wutt Hmone Shwe Yi and telling the story of a family that moved into a colonial-era haunted house. The movie also starred a real Burmese Spiritualist medium, U Hla Aye, who died before its release.

In the 2020s, Myanmar independent cinema gained further international recognition through a series of major festival achievements. In 2021, Na Gyi's What Happened to the Wolf? had its world premiere at the Oldenburg International Film Festival, where Eaindra Kyaw Zin received the Seymour Cassel Award for Outstanding Performance. The film subsequently received further international festival recognition, while Na Gyi and actress Paing Phyo Thu, who went into hiding following the 2021 military coup, were honored with a dedicated tribute at Oldenburg in 2024. In 2022, Hnin Ei Hlaing's documentary Midwives, which follows a Buddhist midwife and her Rohingya Muslim apprentice working together at a makeshift clinic in Rakhine State, received the Special Jury Prize for Excellence in Vérité Filmmaking at the 2022 Sundance Film Festival. In 2024, The Maw Naing’s MA - Cry of Silence received the New Currents Award at the 29th Busan International Film Festival, where the jury praised its portrayal of resistance and solidarity among female factory workers under Myanmar's military rule. In 2025, Lin Htet Aung's experimental short film A Metamorphosis premiered in the Tiger Short Competition at the 54th International Film Festival Rotterdam and received one of the festival's three Tiger Short Awards. The film uses distorted imagery, sound and memories of state television propaganda to explore the experience of growing up under dictatorship. In 2026, Aung Phyoe's debut feature Fruit Gathering was selected for the Crystal Globe Competition at the 60th Karlovy Vary International Film Festival and won the Crystal Globe, the festival's top prize. The film, a Myanmar-Czech-French co-production, follows two young women working in a textile factory in Yangon and explores intimacy, social repression and economic uncertainty in contemporary Myanmar. Together, these achievements marked a period of increased international visibility for Myanmar independent cinema, encompassing documentary, social-realist, experimental and auteur-driven filmmaking.

== Burmese film companies ==
- Z Productions (Formerly Akhuka Productions)
- Akaya Production
- Arkar production
- A Paung Let Kha Nar Films
- Like Art Creation
- Magical Creation Myanmar
- Amyotha
- Artint media production
- BAHUGEN Pictures
- Barani
- Bridge
- Central base production
- Chitthu
- Country Star
- Dawei
- 8K Film
- Everest
- EM Production
- Green Age Film Production
- Harmony Light
- HD Production Team
- Hlaing film production
- Kadipayinkyin
- Khin Sabe Oo film production
- Kyemon
- Kyaw Zay
- Kyaytagon
- Lin
- Lucky Seven
- LuSwankung
- Magic Factory Production
- Ma Ha Htun
- Malikha
- Mittayangpyan
- Moe Kaungkin
- Myanma Motion Picture Enterprise
- Myatharaphu
- Myintmitta
- Myo
- National Network Inc.
- Nawarat
- New Htat Tang
- Novel
- Ohtthaphaya
- One of those Hearts
- Pan Wai Wai
- Papermoon
- Pataukpinlan
- Peacock Media Production
- Phoenix
- Pon Taung Myay
- Pyiphyomyat
- Red Radiance
- Sein Htay
- Sein War Ni
- Sein Tharaphu
- Shutter Production
- Shwe Taung
- Shwe Zin Oo
- Snow White
- Synthesis Productions (local/international)
- 10A Production
- Thazin
- Third Eye
- Thirithanda
- Thukha May
- Wah Wah Win Shwe
- Yamona
- Ye Kyaw Thu
- YMT Productions
- Ywat Sein
- Vision Production
- Zan
- Zinyaw

== See also ==
- Cinema of the world
- Southeast Asian cinema
- Wathann Film Fest
