= Now and Ever =

Burmese Film

- Film poster
- Burmese: ထာဝရနှောင်ကြိုး
- Directed by: Christina Kyi
- Screenplay by: Zenn Kyi
- Story by: Zenn Kyi
- Produced by: Khin Eindere, Martin Tuang
- Starring: Zenn Kyi; Paing Phyo Thu; Min Nyo; Khin Thazin
- Cinematography: Maung Maung Tha Myint
- Edited by: Nyan Wint
- Music by: Zenn Kyi
- Production company: Central Base Production
- Distributed by: Central Base Production
- Release date: October 31, 2019; (Myanmar)
- Running time: 150 minutes
- Country: Myanmar
- Language: Burmese
- Box office: Ks 2.4 billion

Now and Ever (Burmese: ထာဝရနှောင်ကြိုး) is a 2019 Burmese romantic-drama film starring Zenn Kyi and Paing Phyo Thu. The film produced and distributed by Central Base Production premiered in Myanmar on October 31, 2019. The soundtrack of the film released on November 15, 2019.

== Plot ==
Wutt Hmone and Thiha meet at Thiha father's clinic and soon marry. Wutt Hmone is confused in her mind because of her mother's and her past. One day, due to the horrors of the past, she runs outside of home. Thiha finds her at the police station. The truth was that Thiha has a secret that only Dr. Myo Ko knows abou. And Thiha takes Wutt Hmone to Putai, which she wanted to visit. And then Thiha makes Wutt Hmone think that he was having an affair with Yoon Thandar to keep his secret. Finally, Wutt Hmone knows about the secret from Dr. Myo Ko.

== Cast ==
- Zenn Kyi as Thiha
- Paing Phyo Thu as Wutt Hmone
- Min Nyo as Dr. Myo Ko (Psychiatrist)
- Khin Thazin as Yoon Thandar
- Ju Jue K as mother of Wutt Hmone
- Ye Naung Cho as father of Wutt Hmone
- Zu Zue Honey Htwe (child actress) as young Wutt Hmone, young life of Wutt Hmone
- Kyaw Thu

== Release ==
=== Australia ===
It premiered in Perth on August 17, and Melbourne on August 24, 2025.

=== Singapore ===
It premiered in Singapore on August 23 and 24, 2025.

=== United States ===
It premiered in New York City on September 1, in Houston on September 13, in San Bruno, California on September 20, in Union City, California and Sacramento, California on September 21 and Los Angeles on September 27, 2025.

=== South Korea ===
It premiered in Incheon on September 28, 2025.

== Soundtrack ==
Now and Ever

Soundtrack album by Zenn Kyi
- Released: 15 November 2019
- Recorded: Central Base
- Genre: Feature film soundtrack
- Length: 36:59
- Language: Burmese, English
- Label: Bo Bo Music Production
- Producer: Zenn Kyi

The soundtrack of Now and Ever was distributed by Bo Bo Music Production. The music was composed by Zenn Kyi.

All music is composed by Zenn Kyi.

Now and Ever: The Official Motion Picture Soundtrack
No.	Title	Music	Singer(s)	Length
1.	"Forever (အမြဲတမ်း)"		Zenn Kyi	04:44
2.	"In Your Eyes"		Zenn Kyi	04:55
3.	"Saviour (ကယ်တင်ရှင်)"		Zenn Kyi	04:28
4.	"Lu Yaung Saung (လူယောင်ဆောင်)"		Shine	04:07
5.	"Phaut Lite Toh (ဖြတ်လိုက်တော့)"		Chuu Sitt Han	04:57
6.	"PUTAO" (Music of Scene #29)			04:50
7.	"MOTHER" (Music of Scene #36)			02:08
8.	"Now and Ever Theme Music" (Music of Scene #45)	Saw Win Maw		03:34
9.	"Meaning Of Living (ရှင်သန်ခြင်းရဲ့အဓိပ္ပါယ်)"		Zenn Kyi	03:16
Total length:				36:59
