= Saung Taw Shin =

1940 Burmese Film

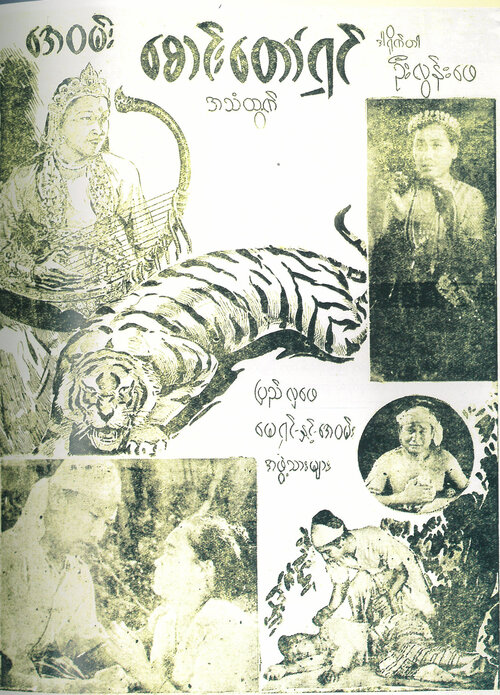
- Film poster
- Burmese: စောင်းတော်ရှင်
- Directed by: Loon Pe
- Starring: Pyi Hla Pe; May Shin
- Production company: A1 Film Company
- Release date: 1940
- Running time: 144 minutes
- Country: Myanmar
- Language: Burmese

Saung Taw Shin (Burmese: စောင်းတော်ရှင်) is a 1940 Burmese black-and-white drama film, directed by Loon Pe starring Pyi Hla Pe and May Shin. The film is about the origin of U Shin Gyi nat.

== Cast ==
- Pyi Hla Pe as Maung Shin, U Shin Gyi
- May Shin as Mal Saw Nhyar
- Shwe Nyar Maung as Maung Htal
- Thar Gaung as Thar Gaung
- Gyan Sein as mother of Maung Shin
