= Chit A Mhya (1940 film) =

1940 Burmese film directed by Tin Maung

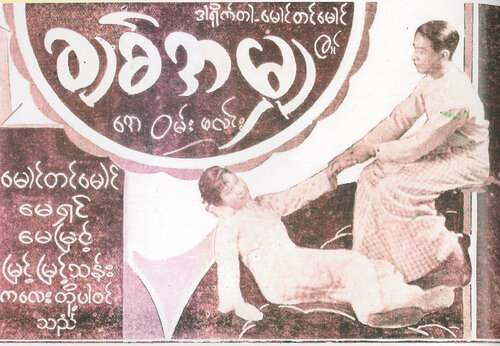
- Film poster
- Burmese: ချစ်အမျှ
- Directed by: Tin Maung
- Screenplay by: Thukha
- Based on: The Toy Wife (1938)
- Starring: Tin Maung; May Shin; May Myint
- Production company: A1 Film Company
- Release date: February 26, 1940
- Running time: 111 minutes
- Country: Myanmar
- Language: Burmese

Chit A Mhya (Burmese: ချစ်အမျှ) is a 1940 Burmese black-and-white drama film, directed by Tin Maung starring Tin Maung, May Shin and May Myint. It is the first sound film of A1 Film Company. It was based on the 1938 American film The Toy Wife.

== Cast ==
- Tin Maung as Tin Oo
- May Shin as Khin Khin Tint
- May Myint as Khin Khin Myint
- Bo Thaung as U Bo Thaung
- Saing Tin as Saing Tin
