= Love and Liquor =

1920 film

- Advertisement of Love & Liquor Film
- Burmese: မေတ္တာနှင့်သူရာ
- Directed by: U Ohn Maung
- Written by: P Moe Nin
- Produced by: Burma Film Company
- Starring: Nyi Pu, Yee Yee
- Distributed by: Burma Film Company
- Release date: 13 October 1920
- Country: Myanmar
- Language: Silent

Love and Liquor (Burmese: မေတ္တာနှင့်သူရာ; Myitta Hnint Thuyar) is a 1920 Burmese black & white silent film directed by Ohn Maung, written by P Moe Nin and starring Nyi Pu. It was the first Burmese feature film, and the day it premiered, 13 October 1920, is commemorated annually as Myanmar Movie Day.

== Plot ==
Love and Liquor is the story about how gambling and alcohol destroyed a man's life.

== Cast ==
- Nyi Pu
- Aye Kyi
- Maung Maung Chit
- Maung Maung Kalay
- Pu
- Ko Nyein
- Par Gyi
- Ba Ga Lay or Shwe Yoe

== Production and release ==
Ohn Maung, Burma's pioneer filmmaker, had founded the Burma Film Company. He hired Nyi Pu, Burma's first actor, to act in the first Burmese feature film, the silent Myitta Nit Thuya (Love and Liquor).

The film opened with the title "Burma Film Presents: Love and Liquor" but there were no credits or mention of the cast. It was based on a story by P Moe Nin.

Love and Liquor premiered at the Royal Cinema in Yangon on 13 October 1920, a day since commemorated as Myanmar Movie Day.

The film proved a major success, despite its poor quality due to a fixed camera position and inadequate film accessories.

== See also ==
- Mya Nat Maung, first Burmese audio film.
