= Win Myint (disambiguation) =

Win Myint (born 1951) is a political prisoner, the former President of Myanmar, and former Speaker of the House of Representatives of Myanmar.

Win Myint may also refer to:

- Win Myint (politician, born 1954), Burmese businessman and former government minister
- Win Pe Myint (born 1948), Burmese painter
- Win Win Myint, Burmese poet

== See also ==
- May Win Myint, Burmese politician, physician, former political prisoner
