= The Emerald Jungle (1934 film) =

1934 Burmese silent film

- poster art
- Burmese: မြဂနိုင်
- Directed by: Maung Tin Maung
- Screenplay by: Dagon Myat Lay Nwe
- Starring: Daw Myint Myint; U Chit Shwe; U Ba Saw Gyi
- Cinematography: Myat Kyaw; Ba Thaung
- Music by: Khin Maung
- Production company: A1 Film Company
- Release date: June 2, 1934
- Running time: 97 minutes
- Country: Myanmar
- Language: Silent with Burmese inter-titles

The Emerald Jungle (Burmese: မြဂနိုင်) is a 1934 Burmese black-and-white silent film about a spoiled urbanite fleeing to the Jungle with a bunch of stunts and actions. But what would also make for an interesting film is the story of the loss and restoration of director Maung Tin Maung's 1934 masterpiece.

== Synopsis ==
Deep in the jungle, where tigers, snakes and elephants are at home, U Pho Thwa, owner of a sawmill, lives in idyllic tranquility with his delightful granddaughter Myint Myint. Out riding one day, Myint Myint is thrown from her horse into the river and saved from drowning by Chit Shwe, a handsome youth from Rangoon. Alas, the young couple must part all too soon, as Chit Shwe is bound back to the city to try and save his father from his cheating stepmother and from squandering the family’s fortune. Chit Shwe needs money, and decides to pretend to be a wanted criminal so that he may turn himself in for the reward. The police however give zealous chase, and Chit Shwe has to escape merely to stay alive, which he does using every available mode of transportation including hot air balloon. The winds of fate blow him in the direction of the sawmill. Happily reunited, Myint Myint and Chit Shwe fight off an attack from a group of thieves during which grandfather loses his life, but Chit Shwe receives the welcome news that his stepmother has finally eloped with her lover, father has regained his poise, and the young couple are anxiously awaited for tea and marriage blessings in Rangoon.

== Cast ==
- Daw Myint Myint as Myint Myint
- U Chit Shwe as Chit Swe
- U Ba Saw Gyi as Ba Saw Gyi
