= Yadanabon (film) =

1953 Burmese film

- film poster art
- Burmese: ရတနာပုံ
- Directed by: Tin Maung
- Based on: Yadanabon by Shwe U Daung
- Starring: Tin Maung; Kyi Kyi Htay; Tin Tin Mu; Maung Aye Kyu
- Music by: Shwe Pyi Aye
- Production company: A1 Film Company
- Release date: December 31, 1953
- Running time: 141 minutes
- Country: Myanmar
- Language: Burmese

Yadanabon (Burmese: ရတနာပုံ) is a 1953 Burmese black-and-white drama film, directed by Tin Maung starring Tin Maung, Kyi Kyi Htay, Tin Tin Mu and Maung Aye Kyu. A1 Film Company won the Best Picture Award and Tin Maung won the Best Actor Award in 1953 Myanmar Motion Picture Academy Awards.

== Cast ==
- Tin Maung as Htun Myat
- Kyi Kyi Htay as Khin Sein Kyi
- Tin Tin Mu as Mi Mi Yee
- Maung Aye Kyu as Thet Nyunt
