= Artists' Shelter =

Non-profit organization

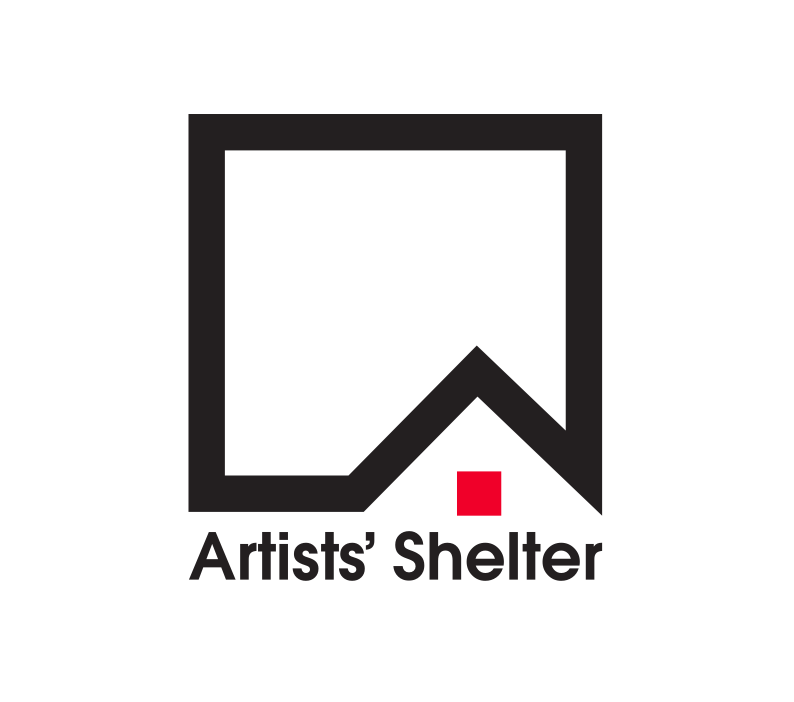
- Abbreviation: AS
- Formation: August, 2023
- Founder: Na Gyi
- Headquarters: Boston, Massachusetts
- Location: Thailand
- Website: https://artists-shelter.org/

Artists' Shelter (AS) is an independent, non-profit organization founded in 2023 by Myanmar filmmaker Na Gyi and fellow artists in exile. Emerging in response to the 2021 Myanmar coup d'état, the organization provides a secure environment, emergency support, creative resources for artists who have been forced to flee Myanmar due to political persecution.

== History and background ==
Following the February 2021 military coup in Myanmar, the ruling junta heavily targeted the arts and cultural sectors. Many high-profile artists, filmmakers and musicians faced arbitrary arrests and detainment under section 505(a) and 505(b) of the penal code for expressing pro-democracy sentiments. Artists' Shelter was established in 2022 to prevent the erasure of Myanmar's revolutionary narratives and to provide a physical and digital sanctuary for these displaced creatives.

== Mission and vision ==
The core mission of Artists' Shelter is to foster a secure community where Myanmar artists in hiding or exile can freely express themselves, collaborate, and contribute to a democratic Myanmar. The organization aims to amplify these voices on the global stage while offering the basic services and infrastructure necessary to sustain artistic livelihood during prolonged displacement.

== Programs and services ==
Artists' Shelter operates through a hybrid model of emergency humanitarian support and professional artistic production:

- Safe spaces & emergency support: AS provides secure housing, emergency funds and mental health support (addressing trauma and PTSD) for artists navigating irregular legal statuses.
- Creative production & facilities: The organization equips members with filmmaking equipments, post-production suites, a recording studio, and a library.
- Capacity building & education: AS runs trainings in digital security, computer literacy and mental health for artists in exile. The organization also offers workshops in basic filmmaking, screenwriting, and post-production.
- Global screenings & exhibitions: The organization facilitates international screenings and exhibitions among Myanmar diaspora to promote democratic movements in Myanmar.
- Merchandise & livelihood generation: To reduce grant dependency, AS operates a merchandise corner that funds both the organization and provides direct stipends to participating artists.

== Impact and fundraising ==
By providing a safe and supportive environment, the organization has enabled artists to continue their work and contribute to the community in exile. Additionally, Artists' Shelter has played a role in preserving Myanmar's artists' works in exile and ensuring that the voices of its artists are heard. Artists' Shelter has established a significant footprint in international advocacy and diaspora fundraising. Through its global film screenings initiatives, most notably the "Daring Flowers", the organization screened short films in 37 cities across 14 countries. The proceeds were distributed to support exiled artist families, war refugees, internally displaced people (IDP) camps, and communities affected by natural disaster.

== Notable artists ==
Many prominent Myanmar artists have been affiliated with Artists' Shelter, including Min Ko Naing, Tu Tu, Min Maw Kun, Lynn Lynn, Anegga, Na Gyi, Daung, Paing Phyoe Thu, Aung Myint Myat, Thazin Nyunt Aung and Novem Htoo. These artists have used their talents to raise awareness about the situation in Myanmar and to advocate for Freedom of Expression.

== Partnerships ==
Artists' Shelter has established partnerships with various organizations locally, such as AJAR, AAPP, Spring University Myanmar and Burma Academy. These partnerships have helped to expand the organization's reach and resources, allowing it to better serve the needs of Myanmar artists.
