= Parrot Film Company =

Burmese film company

The Parrot Film Company was one of the earliest film companies in Burmese film history. Based in Rangoon, the company was owned by Mr Major Parrot, a British man. But the company was not started as a film company. It started as a taxi company.

== The Parrot Taxi Company ==
The Parrot Taxi Company imported Morris and Austin cars from Great Britain in the early 1920s. The company's boss, Mr Parrot met with a young Burmese clerk working in a gambling company when he went to horse racing course to gamble. The young man was U Sunny. He was a sociable, friendly and hard-working clerk who was also very fluent in English. The two became friends later. Mr Parrot told U Sunny to quit his job and offered him a job as a clerk in his taxi company. Later, U Sunny was promoted to managing director by Mr Parrot. Under his management, the company became more prosperous. The taxis increased from about ten to thirty-five and U Sunny was also able to establish a taxi gate near the Strand Hotel.

== The Great Depression and the Transformation ==
By the start of the 1930s, the company was facing severe financial problems caused by the Great Depression which hit Burmese farmers and merchants particularly hard, while the British companies continued to buy rice at low prices. Later, there were riots in Rangoon University together with unrest among farmers and workers. Mr Parrot saw the writing on the wall and decided to retire and return home to England. Before leaving, he sold the company to U Sunny at half its value. U Sunny worked hard to keep the taxi company going during the depression and stave off bankruptcy. One day, however, U Sunny was inspired by the sight of crowds of people pouring out of a cinema and decided to turn his taxi company into a film company. U Ba Thar, his mechanic, agreed to be his company director.

== Movies of the Parrot Film Company ==
The first film "Thirty-Six Animals" became a major hit. It was based on how Burmese suffered from gambling thirty-six animals. Thirty-six animals was one of the earliest gambling system in Burma of the 20th Century. It was played using thirty-six animals which included a tiger, a horse, a mouse and an elephant. The second film "Our Peacock Flag" was also a hit and it was based on politics. It encouraged Burmese revolutionists and so it was censored. The third film was "The Golden Peacock Coin" which also encouraged Burmese nationals to use Burmese peacock coins from the Thibaw Min's reign again despite the present use of the British coins. The seventh film "Our King and Our Queen and Our Buddha" was also censored. It starred Maung Maung Aye and Khin Khin May as Thibaw Min and Queen Supayalat and again encouraged Burmese people to fight against the British. It also showed that Buddhism was starting to fade under the British rule. The Film Censorship Board of Burma passed the film first but later stopped the film from showing due to its controversial story. The company produced and directed about 58 films. The 22nd film, "Teacher," starring Ba Chit and Tin May Kalay was also a major hit. U Sunny gave away free books by Mawbi Hsaya Thein and P Moe Nin to people who came and watched his film.

== Later years of the company ==
U Sunny became a rich man. He owned and operated the company for nearly twenty years. After the Second World War, he handed his company to his son, Ko Pe Kyaing. Parrot U Sunny died in 1956.

== See also ==
- Cinema of Burma
- Parrot company of France
- Parrot SA
