= Mi (film) =

2018 Burmese drama film

- Film poster
- Burmese: မီ
- Directed by: Na Gyi
- Screenplay by: Na Gyi
- Based on: Mi by Kyi Aye
- Produced by: Dr. Nwe Oo
- Starring: Paing Phyo Thu; Nay Toe
- Cinematography: Na Gyi
- Edited by: Nyan Wint
- Music by: Myint Than Htun
- Production company: Victoria Production
- Release date: November 9, 2018 (Myanmar)
- Running time: 120 minutes
- Country: Myanmar
- Language: Burmese

Mi (Burmese: မီ) is a 2018 Burmese drama film, written and directed by Na Gyi. Paing Phyo Thu portrayed the lead character, Mi, and Nay Toe played Thaw Swe. The film is an adaptation of the novel Mi by prominent and well-respected novelist, Kyi Aye. Mi was produced by Victoria Film Production and premiered in Myanmar on November 9, 2018. The film was well received by the audience. Despite high expectations, there were harsh public criticisms at Myanmar Academy Awards (2018) for giving Mi no award.

Mi received two nominations (Best Actress, Best Film) and one award (Best Director of Photography) at ASEAN international Film Festival and Awards (2019). It was officially selected for Cardiff International Film Festival (2020) and Festival International de Cinema de Lleida Visual Art (2020).

== Plot ==
Mi, a free spirited, clever young woman, is dying of tuberculosis, but she could not care less, with cigarettes and brandy as her close companions. Post-WWII Rangoon nightlife is her playground, and she is popular among the upper-class men that she is able to fool. No one knows her true back story.

Still, most men fall for her. Even though they knew that they would be played, men are always after Mi. Among those men, Mg Ko Lay is the young, naïve one and madly in love with Mi, who treats him the same as other men. Unable to stand the emotional toll being with Mi causes him, Mg Ko Lay runs away from Mi by taking a job at a timber camp in the jungle, far away from Rangoon. There he meets Thaw Swe, his boss who treats him like his own brother. Thaw Swe gets to know Mi, through Mg Ko Lay's nightly heartbroken confessions. Mi's regular taunting letters to Mg Ko Lay, drive him crazy. One day, Mg Ko Lay commits suicide. Thaw Swe is dismissed because of the incident.

Thaw Swe wants to meet Mi who could drive a man to his own death. Thaw Swe comes to Rangoon, wanting to teach Mi a lesson. When they meet, everything changes. Thaw Swe learns stories of Mi from a lot of different men. Each man has different stories of Mi. Thaw Swe could not figure out which one is true. Even though Thaw Swe knows Mi is fooling him, he, too, can't help getting tangled with Mi. He soon realizes that he is becoming like Mg Ko Lay and finds himself trying to rescue Mi from herself.

But there is so much more that he doesn't know about Mi. Later he gets mixed up in a murder case of a rich man who has a connection with Mi. Is Mi innocent? Mi is dying anyway. What's the motive? Thaw Swe doesn't understand Mi from the beginning. Mi doesn't try to prove her innocence either. Yet, Thaw Swe becomes an intimate player in the web of mystery that Mi has laid out, rife with dangers, corruptions, and deceits. Meanwhile, Mi has what she thinks is the bigger problem than any other thing, doubting her existence. Will Thaw Swe be able to help Mi? The real question is, “Does Mi really want to be helped?”

== Cast ==
- Paing Phyo Thu as Mi
- Nay Toe as Thaw Swe
- Ye Aung as U Ba Chit
- Min Oo as U Tin Maung
- Thar Nyi as Shwe Dar Myaung
- Aung Ye Htike as Maung Ko Lay

== Awards and nominations ==
Year	Award	Category	Nominee	Result
2018	Myanmar Academy Awards	Best Actress	Paing Phyo Thu	Nominated
2018	Myanmar Academy Awards	Best Cinematography	Na Gyi	Nominated
2018	Myanmar Academy Awards	Best Music	Myint Than Tun	Nominated
2018	Star Awards	Best Actress in a Leading Role	Paing Phyo Thu	Won
2018	Star Awards	Best Wardrobe & Makeup	Zaw Zaw (ad.leono), May Oo	Won
2018	Star Awards	Best Cinematography	Na Gyi	Won
2018	Star Awards	Best Director	Na Gyi	Nominated
2018	Star Awards	Best Picture	Victoria Production	Nominated
2019	ASEAN International Film Festival and Award	Best Film	Victoria Production	Nominated
2019	ASEAN International Film Festival and Award	Best Actress	Paing Phyo Thu	Nominated
2019	ASEAN International Film Festival and Award	Best Director of Photography	Na Gyi	Won
