= Deception: Oo Pel Dan Myin =

2018 Burmese drama film

- Film poster
- Burmese: ဥပါယ်တံမျဉ်
- Directed by: Christina Kyi
- Screenplay by: Zenn Kyi
- Produced by: Khin Eindere, Martin Tuang
- Starring: Zenn Kyi; Thet Mon Myint; Kaew Korravee; Aung Myint Myat; Chuu Sitt Han
- Cinematography: Min Yip; Tin Win Hlaing
- Edited by: Nyan Wint
- Music by: Zenn Kyi
- Production company: Central Base Production
- Release date: January 19, 2018
- Running time: 120 minutes
- Country: Myanmar
- Languages: Burmese, English

Deception: Oo Pel Dan Myin (Burmese: ဥပါယ်တံမျဉ်) is a 2018 Burmese drama film starring Zenn Kyi, Thet Mon Myint, Kaew Korravee Aung Myint Myat and Chuu Sitt Han. The film produced by Central Base Film Production premiered in Myanmar on January 19, 2018.

== Synopsis ==
Min Htet and Zin Mar was a newlywed couple. Zin Mar had a heart condition and was in poor health. Min Htet ran an art gallery and sold antiques. It was a normal family life. One day, a couple moved into their yard. The girl is a lovely Thai girl. When Min Htet saw the unresolved relationship between this Thai girl and a man who seems to be her husband and felt sorry for the Thai girl....

== Cast ==
- Zenn Kyi as Min Htet
- Thet Mon Myint as Zin Mar
- Kaew Korravee as Emily
- Aung Myint Myat as Thein Soe
- Min Oo as Dr. Htay Lin
- Chuu Sitt Han as Hnin Hnin, younger sister of Min Htet
- Ba Nyo as U Htein Win
- Kyaw Ko Ko Wai as Htoo Nay
- Myint Wai as Daw Saw Le Yee
- Win Min Than as Daw Pyone
