= Chit A Mhya =

Chit A Mhya may refer to:

- Chit A Mhya (1940 film), a Burmese black-and-white drama film
- Chit A Mhya (1979 film), a Burmese black-and-white drama film
