= Chain Tan Pyi =

1948 Burmese film directed by Tin Maung

- Burmese: ချိန်တန်ပြီ
- Directed by: Tin Maung
- Starring: Tin Maung; May Shin; May Thit
- Production company: A1 Film Company
- Release date: November 6, 1948
- Running time: 124 minutes
- Country: Myanmar
- Language: Burmese

Chain Tan Pyi (Burmese: ချိန်တန်ပြီ), is a 1948 Burmese black-and-white drama film, directed by Tin Maung starring Tin Maung, May Shin and May Thit.

== Cast ==
- Tin Maung as Thar Khin
- May Shin as May Shin
- May Thit as Hnin Thit
- Thar Gaung as Thar Gaung
