= Nyi Pu =

- Born: Ba Htay; 12 September 1900; Prome, British Burma
- Died: 1 September 1996 (aged 95); Yangon, Myanmar
- Years active: 1915 - 1996
- Spouse: San Yin
- Parent(s): Ba Nyunt and Nyein Shin

Nyi Pu (Burmese: ညီပု, pronounced [ɲì pṵ]; 12 September 1900 – 1 September 1996) was a Burmese actor and film director. He was the first film actor in Burmese cinema. His youngest brother was Tin Maung, an accomplished film director.

== Biography ==
Nyi Pu was born Ba Htay on 12 September 1900 in Prome (Pyay), the second son of Ba Nyunt and Nyein Shin during the British colonial era. In 1920, Ba Htay participated in the First University Strike against the British rulers. In the same year, he along with photographer Maung Maung assisted Ohn Maung who was looking to make films in Burma. In 1920, using the screen name Nyi Pu (lit. Short Brother) starred in the first-ever film Myitta Nit Athuyar in Burma. He made many more silent films in the 1920s and 1930s. After World War II, he made a few more films in the 1950s and 1960s. He was chairman of Myanmar Motion Picture Organization from 1969 to 1972.

Nyi Pu died on 1 September 1996 at Yangon, and was survived by his wife San Yin and their five children.

== Filmography ==
- Myitta Nit Athuyar (actor) 1920
- Kyay-Taw-Thu Ma Nu (actor) 1921
- Taw Myaing Zon Ga Lwan Aung Phan, (actor and director) 1923
- Ta Khaing Lone Shwe, (actor) 1924
- Mhaing Wai Wai, (actor) 1925
- Thamaing Nyut Paung, (actor) 1933
- Su Htoo Pan, (actor and director) 1929
- Shwe Hninzi, (actor and director) 1931
- Japan Yin Thwe (actor and director) 1935
- Kyar Thit Mae, 1923
- Pa Loat Tot Tot, (actor and director) 1925
- Sekkya Shin, (actor and director) 1925
- Shwe Min Wun, (actor and director) 1926
- Mya Ta Bat, (actor and director) 1927
- Mya Aye Yin, 1927
- Myaing Nan San, 1926
- Chit Thwe Nyi Nyi, 1931
- Chit Yay Sin, (actor and director) 1935
- Pan Thitsa, 1954
- Than Khamauk, 1935
- San Yay Yin, 1936
- Chit Lu Youn, 1938 (Audio Film)
- Ko Yin Thwe, 1955
- Chit Thanthaya, 1957
- 528, 1958
- Nan That Ka Pan Ta Khat, 1963
- Ma Maung Taw A Lin, 1965
- Tha Man Kyar, 1970
