= Chuu Sitt Han =

Burmese Singer, actress, model

- ခြူးစစ်ဟန်
- Born: Kyu Kyu Khaing; 4 April 1996 (age 30)
- Education: National University of Arts and Culture, Yangon
- Occupations: Model, Actress and Musician
- Years active: (2014-present)

Chuu Sitt Han (Burmese: ခြူးစစ်ဟန်; born Kyu Kyu Khaing) is a Burmese model, actress, singer and former beauty queen. In 2015, she was crowned Miss Face of Beauty Myanmar and won the title of Best in Talent at the Face of Beauty International Pageant.

== Early life and education ==
Chuu Sitt Han was born on 4 April 1996 in Yangon, Myanmar to parents, Min Naung and Khin Mar Win. She has two brothers and she is the youngest daughter. She graduated in 2013 from the National University of Arts and Culture specializing in Dramatic Arts.

== Career ==
Chuu Sitt Han debuted her career in 2014 by joining a local singing contest, Eain Mat Sone Yar Season 5, and made it up to 5th runner up. In 2015, she was proudly awarded as "Miss Face of Beauty" by the Miss Golden Land Myanmar organisation and got the chance to represent Myanmar at Face of Beauty International pageant in Taiwan. She won "Best in Talent" award among 86 contestants from different countries.

In 2016, she joined Central Base production and debuted in a box office hit film Deception: Oo Pel Dan Myin. She also sang song tracks in that film and another film Now and Ever which was produced by the same production. In 2019, she took part as a contestant in Season 4 of Myanmar Idol, a popular televised singing competition. However, her journey came to an end as she finished among the Top 11 Finalists. She then released multiple single songs such as "A watch from you", "This life", "Hey guys", "Tick Tick Again" and so on. She was also appointed as a "Youth Ambassador" by WWF-Myanmar in 2016.

== Political activities ==
Following the 2021 Myanmar coup d'état, she was active in the anti-coup movement both in person at rallies and through social media. Denouncing the military coup, she has taken part in protests since February.

On 11 April 2021, warrants for her arrest were issued under section 505 (a) of the penal code by the State Administration Council for speaking out against the military coup. Along with several other celebrities, she was charged with calling for participation in the Civil Disobedience Movement (CDM) and damaging the state's ability to govern. She was also charged with supporting the Committee Representing Pyidaungsu Hluttaw, and with generally inciting the people to disturb the peace and stability of the nation.

On 18 October 2021, the state-owned MRTV News announced that a total of 24 artists including Chuu Sitt Han and more have charges against them dropped.

== Discography ==
=== Singles ===
- This Life (ဒီဘဝ) (9.8.2017)
- A Mone Dikar (အမုန်းဋီကာ) (30.1.2020)
- Tick Tick Again (မင်းပေးတဲ့နာရီ) (4.7.2020)
- I am fine (ငါအဆင်ပြေပါတယ်) (11.7.2023)
- နှလုံးသား အတ္ထုပ္ပတ္တိ (lyrics Video ) (25.11.23)
- ထန်းရွက်ပုတီး - ခြူးစစ်ဟန် l Htan Ywat Pa Tee - Chuu Sitt Han (Official MV) (3.12.2023)
- Hey Guy ..လစ်တော့ , Chuu Sitt Han (Lyrics Video) .. (27.3.2024)
- ဘာကြောင့်လဲ ...Why - Chuu Sitt Han (28.12.2024)
- I Am Fine ( ငါအဆင်ပြေပါတယ်) .. Chuu Sitt Han ..(5.1.2025)
- နှလုံးသားတစ်ကွဲစာ (Official MV) (12.11.2025)
- ငါ့ရင်ခွင်ကို - Zaw Win Htut | Covered by Chuu Sitt Han .. (24.3.2026)

== Filmography ==
=== Film-Cinema ===
Lists of Film
Year	English title	Burmese title
2018	Deception: Oo Pel Dan Myin	ဥပါယ်တံမျဉ်

=== Direct-to-Video ===
Lists of Movie
Year	English title	Burmese title
2020	Tick Tick Again	မင်းပေးတဲ့နာရီ

=== Television series ===
Year	English title	Burmese title	Director	Co-stars	Network
2023	A Woman in the Mirror	မှန်ထဲကမိန်းမ	Linn Thein	Htoo Myat, Cho Pyone, Hillary Soe, Chuu Sitt Han	Fortune Channel

== Award ==
- Miss Face of Beauty Myanmar 2015
- Best in Talent Award Face of Beauty International 2015
