= Na Gyi =

Burmese director

- ဏကြီး
- Born: 2 May 1981 (age 45); Yangon, Myanmar
- Occupations: Writer, director
- Notable work: Mi (2018), What Happened to the Wolf? (2021)
- Spouse: Paing Phyo Thu
- Parents: Tin Oo (father); Tin Tin Nwe (mother)
- Awards: Best Director of Photography (AIFFA: 2019); Best Director of Photography (Star Awards: 2019); Best Narrative Feature (Dili International Film Festival: 2021); Hornorary Tribute Award (Oldenburg International Film Festival: 2024)

Na Gyi (Burmese: ဏကြီး; born May 2, 1981) is a Myanmar independent filmmaker. He is best known for writing and directing the feature films Mi (2018) and What Happened to the Wolf? (2021). He has established a notable presence in Myanmar Cinema and received recognition at international film festivals.

Following the 2021 military coup in Myanmar, Na Gyi became a leading voice in the civil disobedience movement (CDM). Targeted by the State Administration Council with an arrest warrant under Section 505(a), he was forced into exile.

In 2024, he was given the Honorary Tribute Award by the Oldenburg International Film Festival.

== Early life, education, and personal life ==
Na Gyi was born in Yangon, Myanmar on 2 May 1981.

After completing his secondary education at BEHS (1), Dagon in 1998, he pursued engineering at Yangon Technology University. He subsequently relocated to the United Kingdom to formalize his technical and creative education, studying Computer Science at Edgware Academy in London before completing digital filmmaking at Raindance London in 2007.

On January 1, 2019, he married Paing Phyo Thu, a Myanmar Academy Award-winning actress from his debut feature film, Mi.

== Career ==
Na Gyi made his feature film directorial debut with Mi (2018), adapting a celebrated novel by Myanmar author Kyi Aye. The film was commercially successful in Myanmar and generated public discussion when it was bypassed for nominations at the 2018 Myanmar Academy Awards. It subsequently received two nominations and won Best Director of Photography at the 2019 ASEAN international Film Festival and Awards. The film was also an official selection at the Cardiff International Film Festival (2020) and Festival International de Cinema de Lleida Visual Art (2020).

His second feature film, What Happened to the Wolf?, had its world premiere at the 2021 Oldenburg International Film Festival. Due to the 2021 Myanmar coup ďétat, Na Gyi and Paing Phyo Thu were forced into hiding and were unable to attend the premiere.

== Activism and exile ==
Following the 2021 Myanmar coup d'état, Na Gyi and Paing Phyo Thu actively participated in anti-coup rallies and utilized social media to denounce the military junta. On 17 February 2021, State Administration Council issued a warrant for his arrest under section 505(a) of the Myanmar Penal Code for his public support of the Civil disobedience movement (CDM). Consequently, the couple were forced into hiding and eventual exile.

Prior to his exile, Na Gyi was a leading advocate for the implementation of the Rating System in Myanmar, challenging the country's strict censorship laws. This initiative, known as the "Rating System Now" campaign, aimed to promote artistic freedom within the Myanmar film industry.

In response to the crisis, Na Gyi founded Artists' Shelter, a legally registered 501(c)(3) non-profit organization. It provides safe space, emergency support, and capacity-building programs for displaced Myanmar artists in exile. To provide a distribution pipeline for these artists, he simultaneously established 24FM (24 Frames Mozart), an independent pay-per-view streaming platform dedicated to uncensored Myanmar films and freedom of expression.

== Filmography ==
- London Tale (feature, 2008; writer, director, actor)
- Where do you come from? What are you doing? Where are you going? (feature, 2012; writer, director)
- Let There Be Dark (short film, 2012; associate producer)
- Bo Ma (feature, 2014; writer, director)
- Mi (feature, 2018; writer, director)
- What Happened to the Wolf? (feature, 2021; writer, director)
- Out Lost Nation (short film, 2022; writer, director)
- Our Turn (short film, 2023; writer, director)
- Guilt (short film, 2024; writer, director)

== Awards and nominations ==
Year	Award	Category	Film	Result
2018	Myanmar Motion Picture Academy Awards	Best Director of Photography	Mi	Nominated
2019	ASEAN International Film Festival & Awards	Best Director of Photography	Mi	Won
2019	Star Awards	Best Director of Photography	Mi	Won
2021	Dili International Film Festival	Best Narrative Feature	What Happened to the Wolf?	Won
2021	Oldenburg International Film Festival	Best Film	What Happened to the Wolf?	Nominated
2022	Hobnobben Film Festival	Best Narrative Feature	What Happened to the Wolf?	Won
2024	Oldenburg International Film Festival	Honorary Tribute Award	-	Won
