= Shine (musician) =

Burmese singer and musician

Shine ရှိုင်း
- Born: Aung Prae Sone; 29 December 1997 (age 27); Rakhine State, Myanmar
- Genres: R&B, pop music
- Occupation: Musician
- Instrument: Piano
- Years active: 2018–present
- Website: Shine on Facebook

Shine (Burmese: ရှိုင်း) is a Burmese singer and musician of Arakan descent.

Shine debuted in 2018 with the R&B album Perfect. In 2019, he sang the theme song "Lu Yaung Hsaung" (လူယောင်ဆောင်) for Christina Kyi's film Now and Ever (ထာဝရနှောင်ကြိုး). In June 2020, he released a self-composed single called "1990," written for his father, who died when Shine was in the eighth grade. In September 2020, he released another popular single, "Existence" (ဖြစ်တည်မှု).

== Discography ==
=== Album ===
- PERFECT (2018)
- PERFECT – AG2021 (2021)
- PERFECT – 80's(2023)

=== Single ===
- Lu Yaung Saung (2020)
- A Thint Shi Thu (2023)

== Personal life ==
Hailing from Rakhine State, Shine (born Aung Prae Sone) is of Rakhine descent.
