= The Daughter of Japan =

- Burmese: ဂျပန့်ရင်သွေး
- Directed by: Nyi Pu
- Produced by: A1 Film Company, PCL Film Company
- Starring: Nyi Pu; U. Tin Pe; San Nyunt; Mitsuko Takao
- Release date: November 30, 1935 (Burma)
- Running time: 84 minutes
- Country: Myanmar
- Language: Burmese

The Daughter of Japan (Burmese: ဂျပန့် ရင်သွေး, pronounced [dʑəpa̰ɰ̃ jɪ̀ɰ̃ðwé]) is a 1935 Burmese black & white film directed by Nyi Pu. Its Japanese name is Nippon Musume. A1 film company produced this film with PCL Film Company in Japan, Tokyo. It opened on 30 November 1935 at the Bayin Cinema and the Olympia Cinema. In 1992 it was screened at the South East Asia Film festival held in Tokyo.

== Cast ==
- Nyi Pu as Maung Ba Htay
- U. Tin Pe as Maung Maung Soe
- San Nyunt as San Nyunt
- Mitsuko Takao as Aye Mi San
