= Korravee Pimsuk =

Thai actress and fashion model (born 1992)

- กรวีร์ พิมสุข
- Born: Korravee Pimsuk; 4 April 1992 (age 34); Bangkok, Thailand
- Other name: Kaew
- Education: Bangkok University
- Occupations: Actress; model
- Years active: 2013–present
- Notable work: Deception
- Height: 172 cm (5 ft 8 in)

Korravee Pimsuk (Thai: กรวีร์ พิมสุข; Burmese: ကရာဗီ; nicknamed Kaew, born 4 April 1992) is a Thai actress and model who has worked in Thailand and Myanmar. She is known for her role in the 2018 film Deception: Oo Pel Dan Myin (ဥပါယ်တံမျဉ်), which was released in Myanmar.

== Early life and education ==
Korravee was born on 4 April 1992 in Bangkok, Thailand. She is the youngest of four siblings. She graduated from Bangkok University with a degree in broadcasting.

== Career ==
Korravee began modeling at the age of 21 and appeared on magazine covers. She made her acting debut in the Thai-Burmese film Myanmar In Love In Bangkok (Ruk Pasa A-Rai), which is about a Thai woman and a male migrant worker from Myanmar. The film was released in cinemas in Thailand and Myanmar in 2014. The following year, Korravee starred in the film 67 Plaza alongside Burmese singer and actor Hlwan Paing.

In 2017, she played Emily in the 2018 film Deception: Oo Pel Dan Myin, alongside Zenn Kyi and Thet Mon Myint. The film premiered in Myanmar cinemas on 19 January 2018 and remained in local theatres for seven weeks. It was also screened in Singapore. The film was commercially successful and received attention from audiences. Korravee's performance as Emily was also well received.

Korravee also appeared in Thai television productions, including Sweetheart of the Poor (2014), Thung Saneha (2020), and The Promise (2020), in which she played the ghost U Kaew.

== Humanitarian work ==
In 2015, Korravee took part in a fundraising campaign for people affected by flooding in Myanmar. She and a group of volunteers collected donations in Bangkok and Samut Sakhon, raising more than 100,000 baht. She also travelled to Yangon to promote Myanmar in Love in Bangkok, her first film, in which she starred alongside Burmese actor Aung Nay So.

== Personal life ==
In December 2021, Korravee publicly began a relationship with television presenter and YouTuber Winyu Wongsurawat. In February 2022, the couple discussed their relationship in an interview, saying that they first connected through social media before becoming a couple.

== Filmography ==
=== Film ===
Year	English title	Burmese title	Role	Notes	Ref.
2014	Myanmar In Love In Bangkok	ဘယ်လိုအချစ်မျိုးလဲ	K	Lead role	
2018	67 Plaza	67 ပလာဇာ	?	Lead role	
2018	Deception	ဥပါယ်တံမျဉ်	Emily	Main role	
2019	LadyBoy	လေဒီဘွိုင်း	Yin Yin Lan	Main role	
2019	Box No. 88	သေတ္တာအမှတ် ၈၈	?	?	
