= Mudras Calling =

2018 Burmese Drama and romance film

- Film poster
- မုဒြာရဲ့ခေါ်သံ
- Directed by: Christina Kyi
- Screenplay by: Christina Kyi
- Starring: Zenn Kyi; Hla Yin Kyae; Nann Wai Wai Htun
- Music by: Zenn Kyi
- Release date: March 16, 2018
- Country: Myanmar
- Languages: Burmese, English

Mudras Calling is a Burmese Drama and romance film with Burmese Subtitle. The film was written and directed by Christina Kyi. In this film, starred Myanmar movie stars, Zenn Kyi, Hla Yin Kyae, Nann Wai Wai Htun & more. The movie is produced by Central Base production.

The movie was officially released on March 3, 2018 at cinemas around Myanmar. And, It was screened at thirteen international film festivals in thirteen countries. It got 2 international movie awards.

== Cast ==
- Zenn Kyi as Jadan William
- Hla Yin Kyae as Hnin Thuzar
- Nann Wai Wai Htun as Nu Nu
