= Zenn Kyi =

Burmese actor, scriptwriter, and singer

- ဇဏ်ခီ
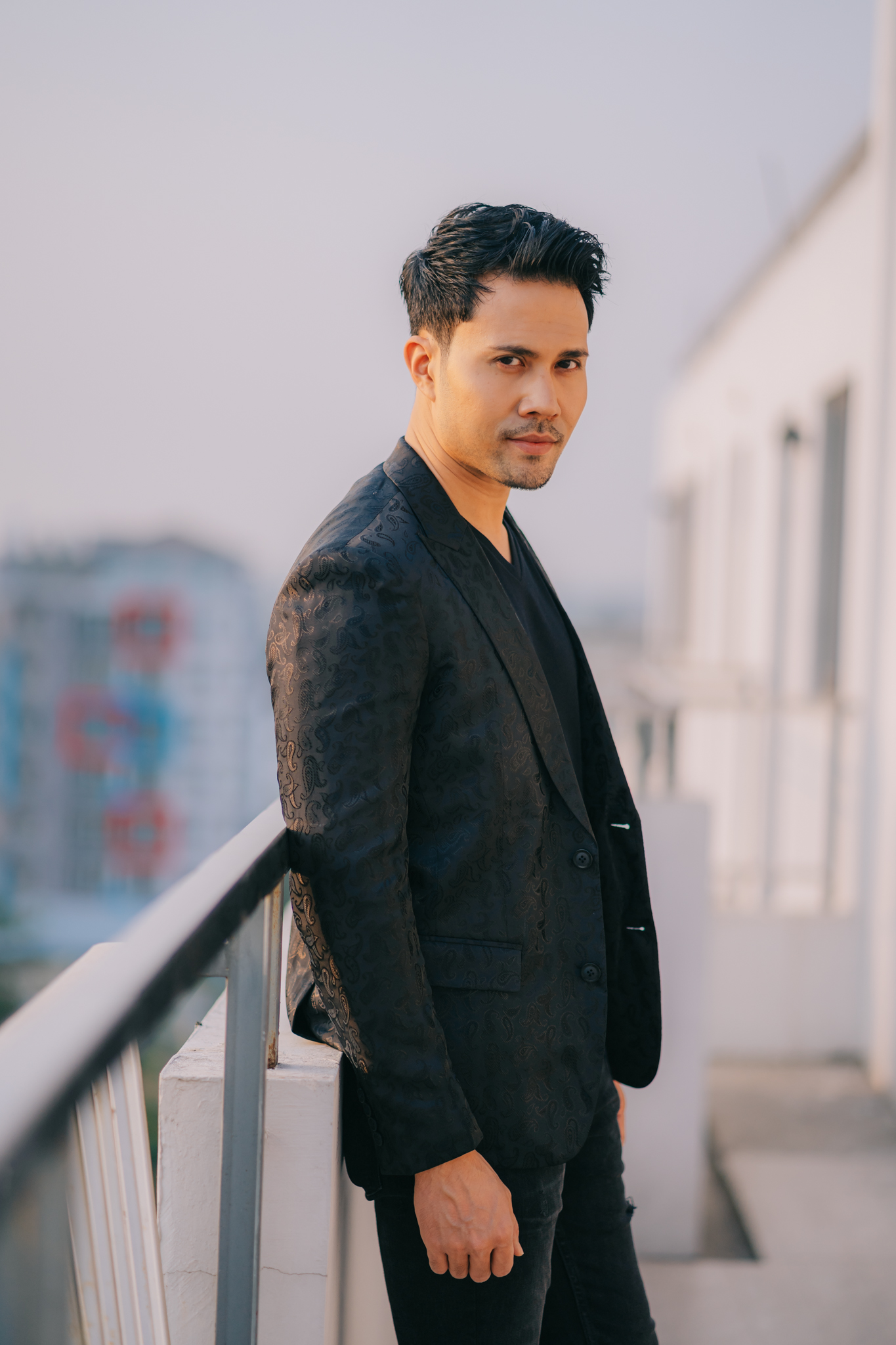
- Born: 25 August 1980 (age 46); Mandalay, Myanmar
- Education: City College of New York; Institute of Audio Research
- Occupations: Actor; singer
- Years active: 2009–present
- Height: 5 ft 11 in (180 cm)
- Spouse: Christina Kyi (m. 2006)
- Children: Noah Lynn Htet Kyi

Zenn Kyi (Burmese: ဇဏ်ခီ, MLCTS: jan hki; born 25 August 1980) is a Burmese actor, scriptwriter, writer and singer. He is best known for his leading role in films Deception (2018) and Mudras Calling (2018), Now and Ever (2019), which propelled him to fame in Myanmar.

== Early life and education ==
Zenn Kyi was born on 25 August 1980 in Mandalay, Burma (now Myanmar), but grew up and studied in New York City, United States, and returned to Myanmar in 2009. He graduated with a degree in music at City College of New York and Film Scoring at Institute of Audio Research.

== Career ==
Zenn released his first solo album The Lost World in 2009. He made his acting debut with leading role in the 2018 film Mudras Calling alongside actress Hla Yin Kyae, directed by his wife Christina Kyi, and which premiered in Myanmar cinemas on 16 March 2018 which was a huge commercial success, topping film ratings and becoming the most hit film at that time.

In 2017, he starred in his second film Deception (Oo Pel Dan Myin) alongside Thet Mon Myint and Kaew Korravee. The film is directed by the same director of Mudras Calling, Christina Kyi, premiered in Myanmar cinemas on 19 January 2018 stayed in local theaters for a record seven weeks and was also screened in Singapore.

The two films was both a domestic hit, and led to increased recognition for Zenn Kyi. He was nominated for the 2018 Myanmar Academy Award for Best Actor.

Now & Ever (2019) earned 3.5 billion kyat at the box office in Myanmar, becoming one of the most successful domestic films of the decade.

== Personal life ==
In 2006, Zenn married Christina Kyi, a film director. The couple have two sons; the firstborn son died young and the second son is named Noah.

== Political views and activities ==
Since he was a teenager, Zenn Kyi has been a strong supporter of the NLD (National League for Democracy) party led by the Noble Peace Laureate Aung San Suu Kyi, who is currently being incarcerated at Nay Pyi Daw prison for obscene charges accused by the Myanmar regime.

On 17 April 2021, in the aftermath of the 2021 Myanmar coup d'état, Zenn Kyi and his wife Christina Kyi were detained at Yangon International Airport right before depart to Bangkok with MAI airline.They were put under house arrest along with their underage son and their assistant for nearly two months before being released.

== Filmography ==
List of films
Year	Title	Director	Co-Stars	Role
2018	Deception	Christina Kyi	Thet Mon Myint, Kaew Korravee, Aung Myint Myat	Min Htet
2018	Mudras Calling	Christina Kyi	Hla Yin Kyae	Jaden Willan
2019	Now and Ever	Christina Kyi	Paing Phyo Thu	Thiha

== Discography ==
=== Solo albums ===
- The Lost World (2009s)

== Awards and nominations ==
=== Academy Awards ===
Year	Award	Category	Nominated work	Result
2018	Myanmar Academy Award	Best Actor	Deception (Oo Pel Dan Myin)	Nominated

=== Other awards ===
Award ceremony	Year	Category	Nominee(s) / Work(s)	Result
Major M Myanmar Music Award	2019	best pop song	Kal Tin Shin	Won
Major M Myanmar Music Award	2019	Best Original Soundtrack	In Your Eyes	Won
Major M Myanmar Music Award	2019	Album Of The Year	Now and Ever Soundtrack	Nominated
Major M Myanmar Music Award	2019	Song Of The Year	In Your Eyes	Nominated
Major M Myanmar Music Award	2019	Best Compilation/ Soundtrack Album	Now and Ever Soundtrack	Nominated
