= Sponsor (2019 film) =

2019 Burmese film

- Film Poster
- Burmese: စပွန်ဆာ
- Directed by: Aung Zaw Lin
- Screenplay by: Thet Oo Maung
- Story by: Lone Ma
- Starring: Nay Toe; Paing Phyo Thu; Zin Wine; Myat Kay Thi Aung; Ye Lay
- Edited by: Maung Hla Myo
- Production company: New Phoe Wa Film Production
- Release date: October 3, 2019 (Myanmar)
- Running time: 112 minutes
- Country: Myanmar
- Language: Burmese

Sponsor (Burmese: စပွန်ဆာ) is a 2019 Burmese drama film, directed by Aung Zaw Lin starring Nay Toe, Paing Phyo Thu, Zin Wine, Myat Kay Thi Aung and Ye Lay. The film, produced by New Phoe Wa Film Production premiered in Myanmar on October 3, 2019.

== Cast ==
- Nay Toe as Toe Wai
- Paing Phyo Thu as Soe Soe Wai
- Zin Wine as U Than Win Naing
- Myat Kay Thi Aung as Mya Sandy Oo
- Ye Lay as Moe Wai
- Kyaw Kyaw as Min Khant Kyaw
- Chaw Kalyar as Honey Zin
- Khine Thazin Oo as Wai Wai
