= What Happened to the Wolf? =

2021 Burmese Film

- Film poster
- Directed by: Na Gyi
- Screenplay by: Na Gyi
- Produced by: May Sandi Tin Oo
- Starring: Eaindra Kyaw Zin; Paing Phyo Thu
- Cinematography: Na Gyi
- Edited by: Nyan Wint
- Music by: Myint Than Htun
- Production companies: Fatty Gangster Production; Thudra Film Production
- Release date: September 16, 2021 (Germany)
- Running time: 119 minutes
- Country: Myanmar
- Language: Burmese

What Happened to the Wolf? is a 2021 Burmese drama film, written and directed by Na Gyi, starring Eaindra Kyaw Zin and Paing Phyo Thu. It was produced by May Sandi Tin Oo, edited by Nyan Wint and background music composed by Myint Than Htun.

The filmmakers of What Happened to the Wolf? faced persecution after the 2021 Myanmar coup ďétat due to the participation in anti-coup movements. The film was regarded as radical and brave in the context of its setting in Myanmar, where LGBTQ+ people frequently face legal persecution, imprisonment and state-sponsored violence.

The film was produced prior to the 2021 Myanmar coup d'état. The director Na Gyi and one of the main cast Paing Phyo Thu, who are married in real life, were forced to go into hiding afterwards for their opposition to the coup. Eaindra Kyaw Zin, the film's other main actor, was arrested and imprisoned in February 2021 and released in early 2022.

What Happened to the Wolf? had its world premiere at Oldenburg International Film Festival 2021 in Oldenburg, Germany. The film was nominated for Best Film, and Paing Phyo Thu was nominated for her performance. Eaindra Kyaw Zin won the Seymour Cassel Award for Best Performance at the Oldenburg International Film Festival.

== Plot ==
Moe (Eaindra Kyaw Zin), the daughter of a wealthy family who built her own successful business, was devastated to learn that she could soon develop lung cancer. At first sight, she tried to commit suicide, by cutting her wrist.

Fortunately, her husband, Ye Moe (Aung Myint Myat), rushed her to the hospital. She met Way Way (Paing Phyo Thu), a teenager with congenital heart disease. A natural rebel who loved rock music - Anglophone bands like Nirvana in her native language; Way Way was a vicious trouble she didn't care about until she died. She spoke positively and rudely to her brother Min Han (Myanmar Idol's host Kyaw Htet Aung). Poor Min Han cared for her since her parents' shipwreck and abandoned his dream of becoming a medical doctor in hopes of finding a cure for Way Way.

As each woman's health deteriorates, her husband has no reason to inherit her business. Her father is sure to inherit. But in order to take good care of the police, Moe had to divorce him. Way Way's concept of leaving the love ones unharmed is the lesser people like them, the better when they part the world. That is why Way Way claims to be so cruel to his brother. At that time, the two women were pure friends and set out on a journey to see the famous local beauty of the Sea of Clouds. They did not really kiss the film at the last minute, but it was enough before the February coup that endangered the filmmakers.

Given the way Way's character aspires to be a photographer, the cinematography here stands out. It explores ventilation, which is full of negative areas that are often disturbed by warm sunlight. There is warmth between the two lead actors in their performance.

== Cast ==
- Eaindra Kyaw Zin as Myint Myat Moe
- Paing Phyo Thu as Way Way
- Kyaw Htet Aung as Dr. Min Han
- Aung Myint Myat as Ye Moe
- Lwin Moe as U Nay Myat Min

== Release ==
=== Film festivals ===
The film premiered at the Oldenburg International Film Festival in Germany on September 16, 2021.

It screened at the Dili International Film Festival in Timor-Leste on October 8, 2021.

It screened at the Taiwan International Queer Film Festival in Taiwan on August 28, 2022.

It premiered at the Buffalo International Film Festival in Buffalo, New York, United States on October 10, 2022.

It premiered at the Hobnobben Film Festival in Fort Wayne, Indiana, United States on October 16, 2022.

It premiered at the British Film Institute in South Bank, London, United Kingdom on April 24, 2023.

=== Countries ===
The film premiered in Singapore cinemas on June 21, 22, 25, 28 and 29, 2025.

In Australia, it premiered in Sydney on June 22, in Melbourne on June 29, in Adelaide on July 5 and in Brisbane on August 9, 2025.

In the US, it premiered in the San Francisco Bay Area on June 29, in Maryland, Seattle metropolitan area and Sacramento, California on July 12, in New York City on July 16 and 30, in Los Angeles and Orlando, Florida on July 19, in San Francisco on July 27, in Houston on August 2, in Buffalo, New York on August 17 and in Boston on August 23, 2025.

In Japan, it premiered in Tokyo on July 6, in Osaka, Fukuoka, Shizuoka and Gunma Prefecture on July 13, in Hiroshima on July 20 and in Nagoya on August 2, 2025.

In Thailand, it premiered in Mahachai, Chiang Mai and Mae Sot on July 19, 20 and will premiered in Bangkok on July 19, 20, 23 and 26, 2025.

In Canada, it premiered in Vancouver on July 26 and in Toronto on September 6, 2025.

In Malaysia, it premiered in Kuala Lumpur on August 9, 2025.

In South Korea, it premiered in Incheon on August 24, 2025.

In the UK, it premiered in London on August 31, 2025.

== Awards and nominations ==
Year	Venue	Award	Nominee	Result	Ref
2021	Oldenburg International Film Festival	Seymour Cassel Award for Outstanding Performance	Eaindra Kyaw Zin	Won	
2021	Oldenburg International Film Festival	Seymour Cassel Award for Outstanding Performance	Paing Phyo Thu	Nominated	
2021	Oldenburg International Film Festival	Best Film	What Happened to the Wolf?	Nominated	
2021	Dili International Film Festival	Best Narrative Feature Award	What Happened to the Wolf?	Won	
2022	Hobnobben Film Festival	Best Narrative Feature Award	What Happened to the Wolf?	Won	

Advisory board jury member and actress Deborah Kara Unger (Crash, The Game) announced the Seymour Cassel Award at the Oldenburg International Film Festival 2021 as follows:

"Acting is reacting. So in this case of an onscreen duo, it is almost impossible to separate the performances of the two lead actresses who take us on a journey to the heart of the puzzle of existence. In Na Gyi's What Happen to the Wolf?, the performances of the two lead actresses, both Myanmar Academy Award winners, leave us breathless. Two characters, one destiny. One is traditional and one is wild. And in stepping back with subtly, humility, and artful discipline, this actress enabled her fellow artist to be free. We celebrate her elegance, her soul, and her invaluable gift to cinema… with hopes that this reaches her."

It is our honor to present the 2021 Seymour Cassel Award for Outstanding Performance by an actress to Eaindra Kyaw Zin in What Happened to the Wolf? by Na Gyi."
