= Nay Win Ate Tan Tat =

Burmese Film

- Burmese: နေဝင်အိပ်တန်းတက်
- Directed by: Wyne
- Screenplay by: Linkar Yi Kyaw
- Based on: Nay Win Ate Tan Tat by Linkar Yi Kyaw
- Starring: Pyay Ti Oo; Paing Phyo Thu; Htun Eaindra Bo
- Production company: Victoria Film Production
- Release date: June 2, 2017
- Running time: 120 minutes
- Country: Myanmar
- Language: Burmese

Nay Win Ate Tan Tat (Burmese: နေဝင်အိပ်တန်းတက်), is a 2017 Burmese drama film starring Pyay Ti Oo, Paing Phyo Thu and Htun Eaindra Bo. The film, produced by Victoria Film Production, premiered in Myanmar on June 2, 2017.

== Cast ==
- Pyay Ti Oo as Dr. Myat Htun
- Paing Phyo Thu as May Kyar Phyu
- Htun Eaindra Bo as Daw Thit Sar
- Ye Mon as Dr. Min Khant
