= Chit Yay Sin =

1940 Burmese film

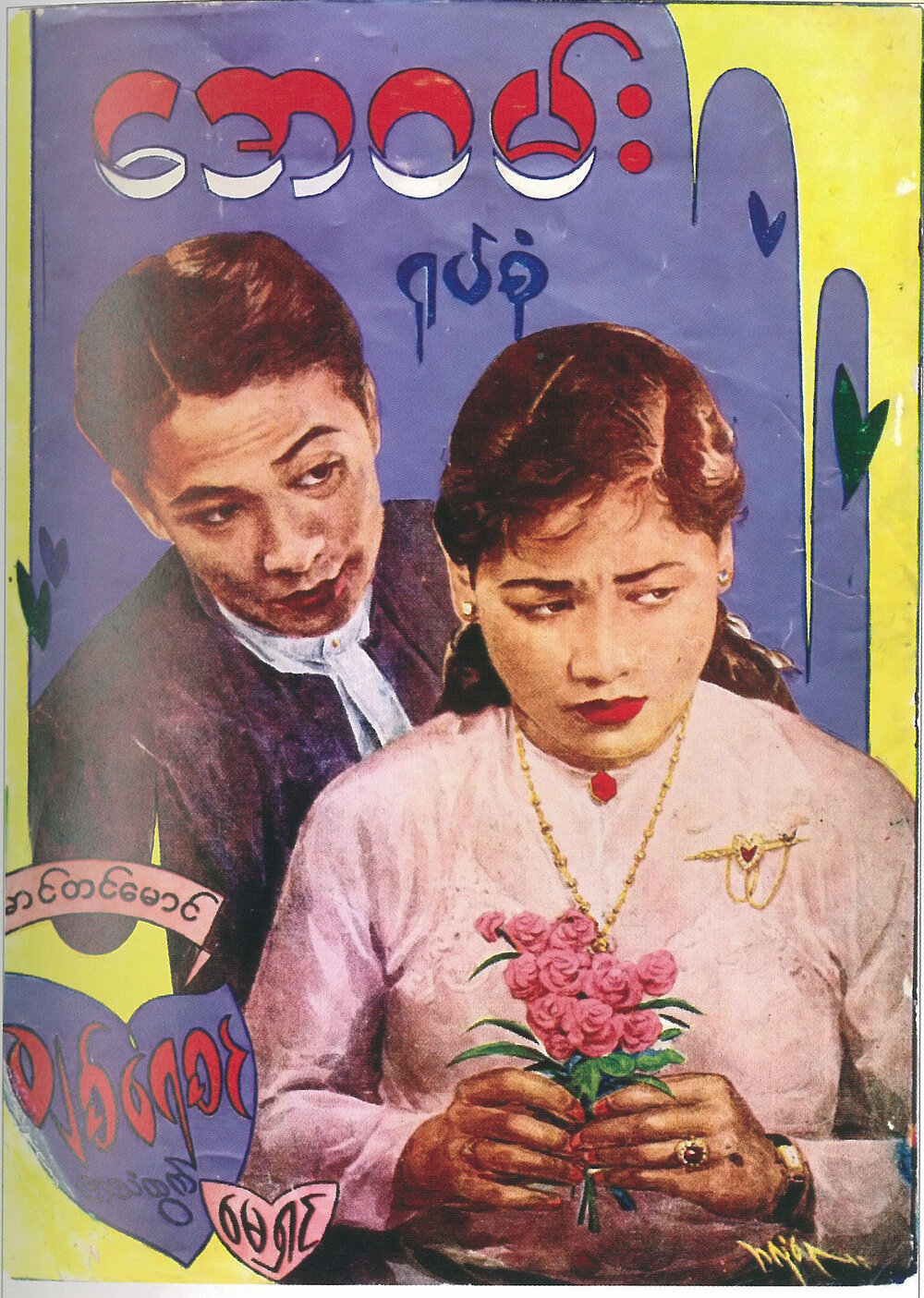
- Film poster
- Burmese: ချစ်ရေစင်
- Directed by: Tin Maung
- Starring: Tin Maung; May Shin
- Cinematography: U Ba Thaung; Hla Maung
- Music by: A1 Orchestra
- Production company: A1 Film Company
- Release date: October 11, 1940
- Running time: 141 minutes
- Country: Myanmar
- Language: Burmese

Chit Yay Sin (Burmese: ချစ်ရေစင်), is a 1940 Burmese black-and-white drama film, directed by Tin Maung starring Tin Maung and May Shin.

== Cast ==
- Tin Maung as Phone Myint
- May Shin as Nyo Nyo
- Thar Gaung as Pan Thway
- Saing Tin as Saing Tin
- Ba Shin as U Ba Shin
- Bo Thaung as U Bo Thaung
