= Tin Maung =

- Born: 7 August 1908; Pyay, Pegu Division, British Burma
- Died: 4 October 2000 (aged 92); Yangon, Yangon Division
- Resting place: Yangon
- Other name: Ko Pu Tu
- Occupations: Producer, Director, Actor
- Years active: 1923–1967
- Spouse: Tin Tin
- Children: San San Win, Hnin Hnin Wint, Khine Soe, Swe Swe Wint, May Thu Khin and Yan Myo Aung
- Parent(s): Nyein Shin and Ba Nyunt

Tin Maung (Burmese: တင်မောင် [tɪ̀ɰ̃ màʊɰ̃]; 7 August 1908 – 4 October 2000) was a two-time Burmese Academy Award-winning film actor, director and producer.

== Biography ==
Tin Maung was born in Pyay, a small town in Lower Burma during the British colonial rule. The youngest brother of Nyi Pu, a famous Burmese actor of early Burmese cinema, Tin Maung began his film career at age 10, in 1923, appearing in Taw Myaing Zon Ga Lwan Aung Phan. In 1934, while enrolled in Rangoon University, Tin Maung joined the A1 Film Company–the preeminent film studio of the time to appear in the film Mya Ganaing. He quickly became known as A1 Tin Maung, one of the studio's stable of stars.

In 1937, Tin Maung directed Aung Thabyay about the final days of King Thibaw, Burma's last monarch, who died an embittered man in exile in India. However, few Burmese got to see it initially, as the colonial government did not allow to the movie to play at theaters. In 1942, during World War II, Tin Maung enlisted in the Burma Independence Army to fight against the British colonialists.

After the war, Tin Maung returned to a film career at A1, increasingly focused on directing. He visited several Asian countries (Indonesia in 1950, India in 1954 and Japan in 1955) to learn directing and film production techniques. He won the Burmese Academy Award for best actor with the 1953 film Yadanabon. He also won another Academy Award for best director with Ko Ye, Toe Ye, Soe Soe Ye in 1967. Tin Maung was chairman of the Film Council (later, Myanmar Motion Picture Organization) from 1964 to 1966.

Tin Maung was married to Tin Tin, and had six children. He lived in Yangon and died on 4 October 2000.

== Filmography ==
- The Emerald Jungle (1934)
- Ta Lane Nit Lane
- Chit Ta Mya
- Aung Thabyay (1937)
- Chit A Mhya (1940)
- Chit Yay Sin (1940)
- Chit Sa Noe
- Min Kaba Le
- bar ma hti
- Chain Tan Pyi (1948)
- Chit Thet Wai (1952)
- Hpuza Shin
- Pyo Do Maung
- bhain Ma tar ya
- Nit Mwar A Theal
- Moe Nya Einmet Myu
- thu ka Lae chit ya mae
- ta man kyar
- Zarti Thway
- Zin Ma so taw main ka lay
- Chit Myay
- Chit Mone Man
- Yout Sein
- Gone Ye Ma Thu
- Myay De Thitsa
- Latt Oo Sayar
- Po Hnin Phyu
- Yin We Khin Twe Zaw Lay Ye
- a kyaw a mar
- Yadanabon (1953)
- Ko Yal Toe Yal Soe Soe Yal (1967)
