= Bo Ma (film) =

2014 Burmese film

- Film poster
- Burmese: ဘိုမ
- Directed by: Na Gyi
- Screenplay by: Na Gyi
- Produced by: Zarni Lwin
- Starring: Ye Deight; Phway Phway; Aye Mya Phyu
- Edited by: Naing Oo
- Music by: Myint Than Htun
- Production company: Pin Lel Film Production
- Release date: December 12, 2014
- Running time: 120 minutes
- Country: Myanmar
- Language: Burmese

Bo Ma (Burmese: ဘိုမ) is a 2014 Burmese drama film, written and directed by Na Gyi, starring Ye Deight, Phway Phway and Aye Mya Phyu. The film was produced by Pin Lel Film Production and premiered in Myanmar on December 12, 2014.

== Plot ==
Jeep Too lost his childhood friend, Bo Ma nine years ago. To this day, he is seeing Bo Ma around him. He is talking with her, arguing with her and even fighting with her sometimes. But people don't see Bo Ma. Only Jeep Too sees her. Being a medical student, Jeep Too understands his own condition and is seeing a therapist. There he meets another patient, Potae who is suffering from emotional coma. They are drawn to each other and spend some time together each day. Jeep Too starts to feel guilty for spending time with Potae and Bo Ma acts out. They fight. Everything is happening in his own mind. But very real for Jeep Too. Watching Jeep Too being very emotional, Potae envies Jeep Too as she couldn't feel any emotion since the car accident that kill her parents and brother. Potae sticks with Jeep Too, hoping she might get some emotion out of their relationship. The odd duo has to go through the puzzle called life to reach their destiny.

== Cast ==
- Ye Deight as Jeep Too
- Phway Phway as Potae
- Aye Mya Phyu as Bo Ma
