= Win Win Myint =

Burmese writer and poet

Win Win Myint (Burmese: ဝင်းဝင်းမြင့်), who uses the pen name Ma Kyee Tan (Loikaw), is a Burmese writer and poet. As of 2005 she had written six books. Many of her poems, short stories and articles had received publication in magazines.

== Awards ==
On 14th June 2003, Win Win Myint won a third prize for short stories in the International Day Against Drug Abuse and Illicit Trafficking competition, and a consolation prize for poetry.

In December 2004, she was awarded third prize in the selected poem genre of the Sarpay Beikman Manuscript Award for 2003.

In 2005, she won an award at the annual Dr Tin Shwe awards for her book Pwint Ye Yin Khon Than (The Heartbeat of a Flower). This is a biography of May Shin, the veteran actress and singer.
