= U Shin Gyi =

Burmese god of the sea

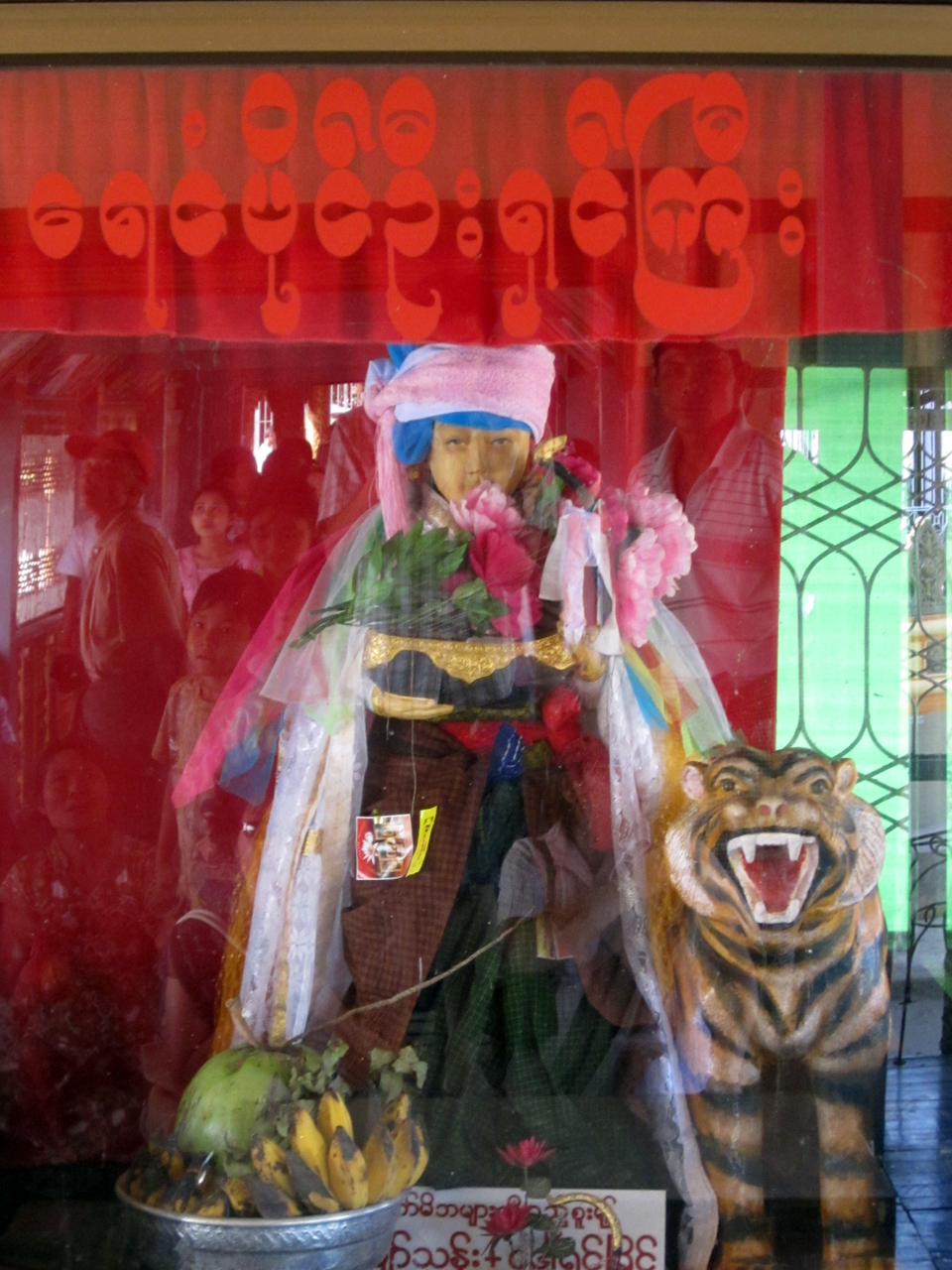
U Shin Gyi statue at the Kyauktan Kyauktan Ye Le Pagoda, seated next to a tiger.

U Shin Gyi (Burmese: ဦးရှင်ကြီး, IPA: [ú ʃɪ̀ɰ̃ dʑí]), also known as Lord of the Sea, Conqueror of the Salty Sea, or ရေငံပိုင်ဦးရှင်ကြီး (IPA: [jèŋàɰ̃ pàiɰ̃ ú ʃɪ̀ɰ̃ dʑí]), is a Burmese nat (spirit) commonly venerated in the Ayeyarwady Delta region. He is regarded as the guardian spirit of the sea, rivers, and waterways, and is especially revered by coastal communities.

U Shin Gyi is commonly depicted next to a tiger and crocodile, and is often shown holding a Burmese harp. He is believed to protect fishermen, boatmen, and travelers who traverse the waterways, and is associated with blessings of safety, abundance, and favorable tides.

== Legend ==
According to tradition, U Shin Gyi was born in the Mon era in Kasin village (alternatively, Siti village) in the Bago Region. After his father's death, he and his widowed mother, Daw Phyu, fell into poverty. To support his mother, he played the harp skillfully, which brought them some income. They later moved to Dala after being mistreated by relatives who refused to return borrowed money.

U Shin Gyi became a boatman to earn enough to ordain as a monk. During one journey, he and other woodcutters reached Meinmahla Island (also called Meemen Hla or Meninhla Kyun). While cutting driftwood, U Shin Gyi played his harp, attracting the attention of two nat sisters. Enchanted by the melody, they would not allow the boat to leave the island. After drawing lots three times, U Shin Gyi was selected for sacrifice to appease the spirits. According to legend, he vanished before hitting the water, transforming into a nat. From then on, he became known as U Shin Gyi, or Kyun Nyo Shin, the guardian deity of salt water.

== Sacred geography ==
U Shin Gyi is closely associated with Meninhla Kyun, also known in Mon as Mein Mla (“island where the emerald trees grow”). South of this is Kyun Nyo Gyi, now known as Kyun Nyo Gyi Village, a densely populated community where he is still widely revered.

Local belief holds that crocodiles in the area are his guardians. Any act of disrespect, particularly harming crocodiles, is believed to provoke U Shin Gyi's wrath.

== Worship and rituals ==
Though not listed among the formal 37 nats, U Shin Gyi is widely worshipped in coastal areas of Lower Myanmar. A nat festival dedicated to him is held annually in March, drawing large numbers of devotees who offer alms, perform rituals, and seek his blessings.

Traditional offerings include:

- Coconut, banana, rice, tea, betel leaves
- Salt, oil, gold leaf, and flowers
- Fragrant incense, thorn-tree blossoms, and palm-leaf huts

Alms ceremonies often feature recitations such as:

"Pearl silver, sand and water, owned by Pe Shwe City, ... deity of the sea, on the island, sit and eat alms at the deity shop, glorious deity king, please come back..."

And:

"...you are the owner of the golden island... the pure and pure, the coconut and banana dance, the festival, the celebration... with harp and betel leaf, joyfully and joyfully, Kyunnyo Thakin Nat U Shin..."

== Prayer ==
Prayers to U Shin Gyi invoke protection against sea monsters, natural disasters, and bad omens:

"May the power of the gods remove all dangers and dangers... May the evil dreams, evil spirits, tigers, snakes, and crocodiles be kept at bay. Lord of salt water, Lord of the gods, the first god..."
