= May Shin =

Burmese actress and singer (1917–2008)

- မေရှင်
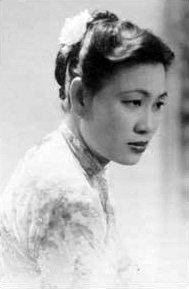
- Shin in the 1920s
- Born: Than Shin; 10 March 1917; Mandalay, British Burma
- Died: 3 September 2008 (aged 91); Mandalay, Myanmar
- Years active: 1936–1961
- Parent(s): U Khin Lay and Daw Pwa Yon
- Awards: Wunna Kyawhtin

May Shin (Burmese: မေရှင်; pronounced [mè ʃɪ̀ɰ̃]; 10 March 1917 – 3 September 2008) was a Burmese actress and singer, who was popular from the 1930s to the 1950s.

== Biography ==
May Shin was born Than Shin (သန်းရှင်, [θáɴ ʃɪ̀ɴ]) on 10 March 1917, to businessman Khin Lay (ခင်လေး) and his wife Pwa Yon (ဖွားယုံ). in Mandalay in British Burma. She was the youngest of five siblings. She passed seventh grade from Wesleyan School. At the age of 18 years old, May Shin joined A1 Film Company as an aspiring actress. She was soon highly acclaimed for her soft gentle singing voice.

Shin's first film was Hpuzar Shin, starring opposite actor Yegaung Chit Swe but she became known in the first Burmese sound film Hmya Nat Maung.

As a radio presenter at the Burma Broadcasting Service in the 1950s, Shin actively supported U Nu's government against the left-wing campaign by appealing to armed insurgents to surrender. In 1958, she was awarded the title Wunnakyawhtin (ဝဏ္ဏကျော်ထင်), the highest honor given to an artist by the Burmese government in that time. In 1962, at the age of 45, May Shin gave up acting and singing and withdrew from public life. She became devoutly Buddhist and practiced dharma until the day she died.

In 2004, purged Prime Minister Gen Khin Nyunt visited Shin in Mandalay shortly before he was arrested.

In her later life, Shin spent most of her time in Buddhist contemplation at her residence in Mandalay. Win Win Myint (a.k.a. Nandaw Shay), author of May Shin's biography, Pan Pwint Ye Yin Khon Than ("The Heartbeat of a Flower"), said that she never married and that she loved to uphold Burmese traditional culture and religion.

Shin died of pulmonary edema at her residence in Aung Daw Mu Ward, Mandalay, on 3 September 2008, aged 91.

== Filmography ==
May Shin made 14 films in total.

- Hpuza Shin
- Mhya Nat Maung
- Chit Tha Mhya
- Chit Yay Sin
- Saung Taw Shin
- Chain Tan Pyi
- May Thawda

== Discography ==
She released over 40 records with A1 Records. The following is a list of her successful records.

- Chit Yay Sin
- Shwe Pyaung Pyaung
- Aunggyin Shitpa
- Pyo Mha Dan
- Myat Lay Ngoun
- Thawda Ngwe Min
- Kyay Say Taman
- Chit Khet Thetlya
- Mya Kay Khine
- Phoo Sar Paing
- Shwe Moe Nyo
- Lei Lei Win
- Ko Pine Myittar
- Kyaung Pate Yet
- Mae Darli
- Chit thal swal
- Paramidaw
- Shwe Wah Phoo
- Shae Bayin
- Chit Pann Hlwar
- Mal Khu Hmyaw
- Chit Pan Hlwar
- Mane Yar thi
- Khit Pyaung Chein
- Mya Kay Khine
- Thet Wai (With Pyi Hla Pe)
- Shae Ku Tho (With Pyi Hla Pe)
- Shae Yae Set (with Pyi Hla Pe)
- Chit Mar Larr (With Pyi Hla Pe)
