= Paing Phyo Thu =

Burmese actress

- ပိုင်ဖြိုးသု
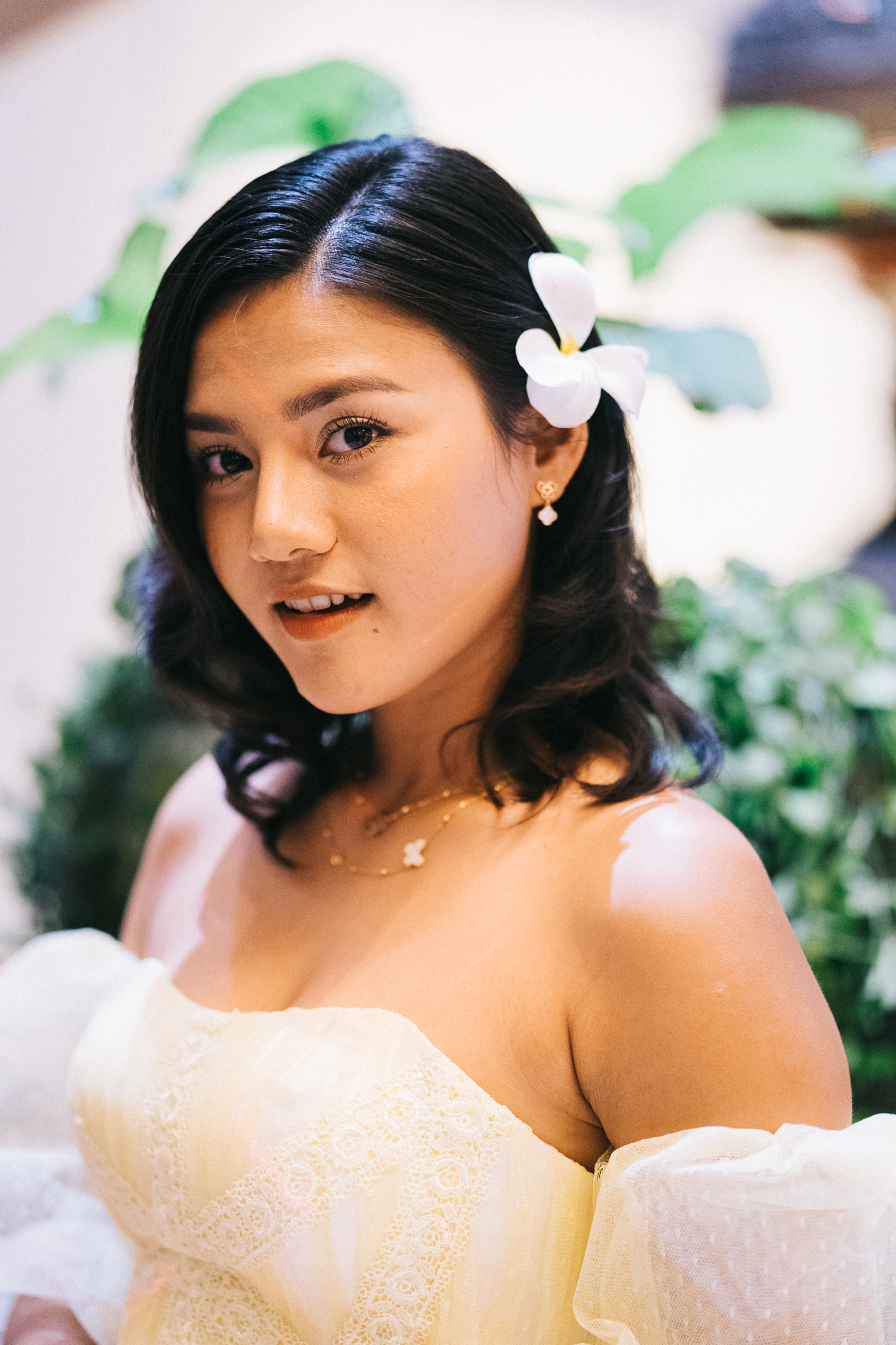
- Born: 5 April 1990 (age 36); Yangon, Myanmar
- Other name: Thu Thu
- Education: University of Medicine 1, Yangon
- Occupation: Actress
- Spouse: Na Gyi
- Parent(s): Soe Win (father); Nwe Oo (mother)

Paing Phyo Thu (Burmese: ပိုင်ဖြိုးသု; born 5 April 1990) is a Myanmar Academy Award-winning Burmese film actress. She won the Myanmar Academy Award for Best Supporting Actress in 2017 Myanmar Motion Picture Academy Awards with the film 3Girls. She is known for her performances in Mi (2018), Now and Ever (2019) and What Happened to the Wolf? (2021).

== Early life and education ==
Paing Phyo Thu was born on 5 April 1990 in Yangon, Myanmar. Her mother, Nwe Oo, is a physician.

Paing Phyo Thu matriculated from TTC Yangon in 2006. She graduated from the University of Medicine 1, Yangon.

She served as health ambassador (Yangon Division) for the Ministry of Health and Sports in 2018.

== Career ==
Paing Phyo Thu started her career as a child actor in 1999. Her performances stood out, and she became an actress major films in Myanmar in later years. In 2017, she was cast to play a lead role in the film Mi, based on a novel by one of the most prominent Myanmar novelists, Kyi Aye. Although expectations were high, the film was well received by the audience. There was some criticism of her portrayal of character Mi, who is a chain-smoker. Paing Phyo Thu stood firmly of her portrayal of Mi by giving up her title of health ambassador (Yangon Division) for the Ministry of Health and Sports.

She won the Best Actress Award for her performance in Mi at the Star Awards (2018). She was nominated for Best Actress for her performance at the ASEAN International Film Festival (2019). In 2021, she was also nominated for Best Performance (Seymour Cassel Award) for What Happened to the Wolf? at the Oldenburg International Film Festival (2021).

On 1 January 2019, Paing Phyo Thu married Na Gyi, the Burmese film director who directed Mi.

== Political activities ==
Following the 2021 Myanmar coup d'état, Paing Phyo Thu was active in anti-coup movements, in person at rallies, and through social media. She denounced the military coup. She joined the "We Want Justice" three-finger salute movement. The movement was launched on social media, and many celebrities joined itt.

On 2 April 2021, a warrant for her arrest was issued under section 505 (a) of the Myanmar Penal Code by the State Administration Council for speaking out against the military coup, calling for participation in the Civil Disobedience Movement (CDM) and supporting the Committee Representing Pyidaungsu Hluttaw. Paing Phyo Thu and Na Gyi have been in hiding ever since.

== Filmography ==
=== Film (cinema) ===
- Angel of Eden (2016)
- Nay Win Ate Tan Tat (2017)
- 3Girls (2017)
- Mi (2018)
- Lay Par Kyawt Shein Warazain (2019)
- Sponsor (2019)
- Now and Ever (2019)
- Bo Nay Toe (2019)
- Confession of a Woman (2020)
- Longing with Love (2020)
- Lady Danger (2020)
- What Happened to the Wolf? (2021)
- It's Not Over, We Still Have Our Turn (2023)

=== Television series ===
- Battle of 2 Flowers (2017)

== Awards ==
| Year | Award | Category | Film | Result |
|---|---|---|---|---|
| 2016 | Myanmar Academy Award | Best Supporting Actress | Angel of Eden | Nominated |
| 2017 | Myanmar Academy Award | Best Supporting Actress | 3Girls | Won |
| 2018 | Myanmar Academy Award | Best Actress | Mi | Nominated |
| 2018 | Star Awards | Best Actress | Mi | Won |
| 2019 | ASEAN International Film Festival and Awards | Best Actress | Mi | Nominated |
| 2021 | Oldenburg International Film Festival | Best Performance (Seymour Cassel Award) | What Happened to the Wolf? | Nominated |
| 2024 | Oldenburg International Film Festival | Honorary Tribute Award | - | Won |
