= Oldenburg International Film Festival =

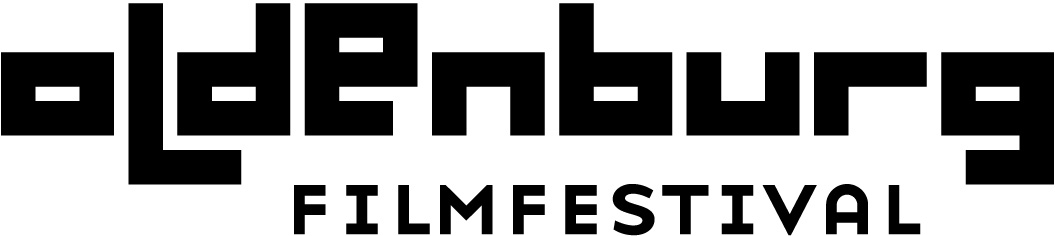
- Location: Oldenburg, Germany
- Founded: 1994
- Website: www.filmfest-oldenburg.de

The Oldenburg International Film Festival, sometimes called the European Sundance, has covered the international film scene in all aspects since 1994. It is held in Oldenburg, Germany.

== History ==
Films such as Park Chan-wook’s The Handmaiden, Takeshi Kitano’s Kids Return, David Cronenberg’s Spider, Kevin Spacey’s Albino Alligator, Steven Soderbergh’s Out of Sight, Larry Clark’s Ken Park, Luke and Andrew Wilson’s The Wendell Baker Story, and The Fountain by Darren Aronofsky or indie hits like Larry Fessenden’s Habit, Cory McAbee’s The American Astronaut, Michael Polish’s Northfork, Paul Provenza’s The Aristocrats, Susan Buice and Arin Crumley’s Four Eyed Monsters or The Guatemalan Handshake by Todd Rohal, received their German premiere in Oldenburg.

== Tributes and retrospectives ==
Tributes (by year)

- 1994: Nancy Savoca
- 1995: Katt Shea
- 1996: (none)
- 1997: Icíar Bollaín
- 1989: Seymour Cassel
- 1999: Asia Argento
- 2000: Stacy Cochran
- 2001: Ben Gazzara, Richard Stanley
- 2002: Édouard Niermans
- 2003: Larry Clark
- 2004: Tim Blake Nelson
- 2005: Luke Wilson, Andrew Wilson
- 2006: Peter Fleischmann
- 2007: Stacy Keach
- 2008: Marius Müller-Westernhagen, Michael Wadleigh
- 2009: Scott McGehee, David Siegel
- 2010: Timothy Bottoms
- 2011: Roger Fritz
- 2012: (none)
- 2013: Bobcat Goldthwait
- 2014: (none)
- 2015: Joanna Cassidy
- 2016: Nicolas Cage, Amanda Plummer
- 2017: Lou Diamond Phillips
- 2018: Keith Carradine
- 2019: Seymour Cassel
- 2020: (none)
- 2021: Mattie Do
- 2022: Andrea Rau
- 2023: Isild Le Besco, Jen Gatien
- 2024: Na Gyi & Paing Phyo Thu
- 2025: Scott Glenn
- 2025: Don Keith Opper
- 2026: Zoë Bell

Retrospectives

- 1994: Alex Cox
- 1995: Frank Oz
- 1996: James B. Harris
- 1997: Tim Hunter
- 1998: Roberto Faenza
- 1999: Harry Kümel
- 2000: William Wellman Jr.
- 2001: Jim McBride
- 2002: Bernard Rose
- 2003: Philippe de Broca
- 2004: Andrzej Żuławski
- 2005: Ken Russell
- 2006: Jerry Schatzberg
- 2007: Abel Ferrara
- 2008: James Toback
- 2009: Bruno Barreto
- 2010: Radley Metzger
- 2011: Ted Kotcheff
- 2012: Phedon Papamichael
- 2013: Mania Akbari
- 2014: Philippe Mora
- 2015: George Armitage
- 2016: Christophe Honoré
- 2017: Edward R. Pressman
- 2018: Bruce Robinson
- 2019: Burkhard Driest
- 2020: William Friedkin
- 2021: Ovidio G. Assonitis
- 2022: Peter Hyams, John Hyams
- 2023: (none)
- 2024: Dominik Graf
- 2025: James William Guercio
- 2026: Neil LaBute

== Awards ==
=== German Independence Award: Best Film ===
- 1998: Richard Schenkman — Went to Coney Island on a Mission from God... Be Back by Five — USA, 1998
- 1999: Noah Stern — The Invisibles — USA
- 2001: Buket Alakuş — Anam — Germany
- 2002: Scott Thomas — Anacardium (Deranged)) — USA
- 2003: Michael Polish — Northfork — USA
- 2004: Dennis Iliadis — Hardcore — Greece
- 2005: Marcos Siega — Pretty Persuasion — USA
- 2006: Scott Dacko — The Insurgents — USA
- 2007: Jan Hinrik Drevs — Underdogs — Germany
- 2008: Emily Atef — The Stranger in Me (Das Fremde in mir) — Germany
- 2009: Judi Krant — Made in China — USA
- 2010: Paul Gordon — The Happy Poet — USA
- 2011: K. Lorrel Manning — Happy New Year — USA
- 2012: Jan-Ole Gerster — A Coffee in Berlin (Oh Boy) — Germany
- 2013: David Perrault — Our Heroes Died Tonight (Nos heros sont morts ce soir) — France
- 2014: Michal Samir — Hany — Czech Republic
- 2015: Tom Sommerlatte — Summers Downstairs (Im Sommer wohnt er unten) — Germany/France
- 2016: Emre Konuk — The Apprentice (Çirak) — Turkey
- 2017: Kubilay Sarikaya and Sedat Kirtan — Familiye — Germany
- 2018: Mikhal Raskhodnikov — Vremennye trudnosti — Russia
- 2019: Adam VillaSeñor and Reza Ghassemi — In Full Bloom — USA/Japan
- 2020: Miles Hargrove — Miracle Fishing — USA
- 2021: Scott Monahan — Anchorage — USA
- 2022: John Connors — The Black Guelph — Ireland
- 2023: Ayşe Polat — In the Blind Spot — Germany
- 2024: Max Train — James — Canada
- 2025: Ondřej Provazník — Broken Voices — Czech Republic, Slovakia
- 2026: Zachary Nichols — Variations on Violence — USA

=== German Independence Award: Best German Film ===
The Best German Film award is juried by an international panel of five—filmmakers, actors, artists, writers, producers—of which at least three members come from other countries than Germany. The films are shown in original version with English subtitles. Jury members have been, e.g., in 2011: Matteo Lovadina, Radley Metzger, Ildi Toth Davy, Soopum Sohn, and Matthew Modine. The 2012 festival saw an all-woman jury, consisting of Tamar Simon Hoffs, Gabrielle Miller, Lana Morgan, Debbie Rochon, and Mira Sorvino.

- 2004: Andreas Struck — Sugar Orange — Germany
- 2005: Catharina Deus — About a Girl (Die Boxerin) — Germany
- 2006: Birgit Grosskopf — Princess (Prinzessin) — Germany
- 2007: Jakob Moritz Erwa — All the Invisible Things (Heile Welt) — Austria
- 2008: Emily Atef — The Stranger in Me (Das Fremde in mir) — Germany
- 2009: Thomas Sieben — Distance — Germany
- 2010: Philip Koch — Picco — Germany
- 2011: Linus de Paoli — Dr. Ketel — Germany
- 2012: Jan-Ole Gerster — A Coffee in Berlin (Oh Boy) — Germany
- 2013: Tom Lass — Kaptn Oskar — Germany
- not awarded since 2014 due to budget cuts

=== German Independence Award: Best Short Film ===
- 2007: Marcos Valin, David Alonso — Atención al cliente (Customer Service) — Spain
- 2008: Liz Adams — Side Effect — USA
- 2009: Hassan Said — Mute — USA (Best foreign-language short film)
- 2009: Tom Bewilogua — SCISSU — Germany (Best German-language short film)
- 2010: Jeremy Bradley, Reuben Sack — Salvation Insurance — USA
- 2011: Markus Engel — Der letzte Gast (The Last Guest) — Austria
- 2012: Meghna Gupta, Gigi Berardi — Unravel — United Kingdom / India
- 2013: Patrick Baumeister — Preis — Germany
- 2014: Kevin Meul — Cadet — Belgium
- 2015: Martijn de Jong — Free — Netherlands
- 2016: Ruken Tekes — The Circle (Hevêrk) — Turkey
- 2017: Thierry Bessling, Loïc Tanson — Sur le fil — Luxembourg
- 2018: Jeremy Comte — Fauve — Canada
- 2019: Kahina Le Querrec — Blue Hour — France
- 2020: Igor Nevedrov — The Coat — Russia
- 2021: Lucas Camps — Wall#4 — Netherlands
- 2022: Samuel Bereuther — Jockstrap Jesus — Germany
- 2023: María Monreal — When Grass Grows — Spain
- 2024: Diego Gaxiola — Nostalgia of a (Still) Alive Heart — Mexico
- 2025: Jorge Florez Arcila — The Flower of Fear — Columbia
- 2026: Michele Leonardi — TWhite Whiter Whitest Black — Italy

=== German Independence Honorary Award ===
- 2013: Mania Akbari, Bobcat Goldthwait
- 2014: Philippe Mora
- 2015: George Armitage, Joanna Cassidy
- 2016: Nicolas Cage, Christophe Honoré, Amanda Plummer
- 2017: Edward R. Pressman, Lou Diamond Phillips
- 2018: Bruce Robinson, Keith Carradine
- 2019: Burkhard Driest
- 2020: William Friedkin
- 2021: Ovidio G. Assonitis, Mattie Do
- 2022: Peter Hyams, John Hyams, Andrea Rau
- 2023: Isild Le Besco, Jen Gatien
- 2024: Dominik Graf, Na Gyi, Paing Phyo Thu
- 2025: James William Guercio, Scott Glenn, Don Keith Opper
- 2026: Neil LaBute, Zoë Bell

=== Hans Ohlms Award for Best First Feature Film ===
Since 2023, the Hans Ohlms Award for Best First Feature Film is awarded in conjunction with the Hans Ohlms Foundation.

- 2023: Takayuki Hayashi — From Dawn Till Noon On The Sea — Japan
- 2024: Michael J. Long — Baby Brother — UK
- 2025: Alejandro Castro Arias — Harakiri, I Miss You — Spain
- 2026: Matthew Osubor — Big Daddy’s Flowers — USA

=== Otto Sprenger Award ===
- 2007: Ben Reding, Dominik Reding — For The Unknown Dog (Für den unbekannten Hund) — Germany
- 2008: Emily Atef — The Stranger in Me (Das Fremde in mir) — Germany

=== Seymour Cassel Award: Outstanding Performance ===
This actor’s prize is awarded for performances in films nominated for the Best German Film award.

- 2012: Tom Schilling for his role as Niko Fischer in A Coffee in Berlin (Oh Boy) — Germany
- 2013: Martina Schöne-Radunski for her role as Alex in Kaptn Oskar — Germany
- 2014: Victoria Schulz for her role as Ruby in Rough Road Ahead (Von jetzt an kein Zurück) — Germany
- 2015:
  - Sarah Silverman for her role as Laney in I Smile Back — USA
  - Nikola Rakočević for his role as Slav in Travelator — Serbia
- 2016:
  - Noémie Merlant for her role as Claire in Twisting Fate (À tous les vents du ciel) — France
  - André M. Hennicke for his role as Udo in Strawberry Bubblegums — Germany
- 2017:
  - Lindsay Burdge for her performance in Thirst Street — USA, France
  - Gregory Kasyan for his role as Mills in Quest — USA
- 2018:
  - Victoria Carmen Sonne for her role as Sascha in Holiday — Denmark
  - Gabriela Ramos for her role as Lili in Is that you? — UK
- 2019:
  - Patrycja Planik for her performance in Lillian — Austria
  - Zachary Ray Sherman in Cuck — USA
- 2020:
  - Paz de la Huerta for her performance in Puppy Love — USA
  - Daniel Aráoz in The Longest Night by Rob Lambert — Argentina
- 2021:
  - Eaindra Kyaw Zin for her performance in What happened to the Wolf — Myanmar, 2021
  - Dakota Loesch in Anchorage — USA
- 2022:
  - Cyndie Lundy for her performance in Parsley — Dominican Republic
  - Graham Earley in The Black Guelph — Ireland
- 2023:
  - Alexandrea Meyer for her performance in Beautiful Friend — USA
  - Jon Jacobs in Passenger C — USA
- 2024:
  - Aki Kigoshi for her performance in A Wasted Night — Japan
  - Tim Blake Nelson for his performance in Bang Bang — USA
- 2025:
  - Sabrina Amali for her performance in Maysoon — Germany, Greece
  - John Connors for his performance in Crazy Love — Ireland
- 2026:
  - Gia Crovatin for her performance in Murderous — USA
  - Frank Mosley for his performance in Jackrabbit — USA
