= Christina Kyi =

- ခရစ္စတီးနားခီ
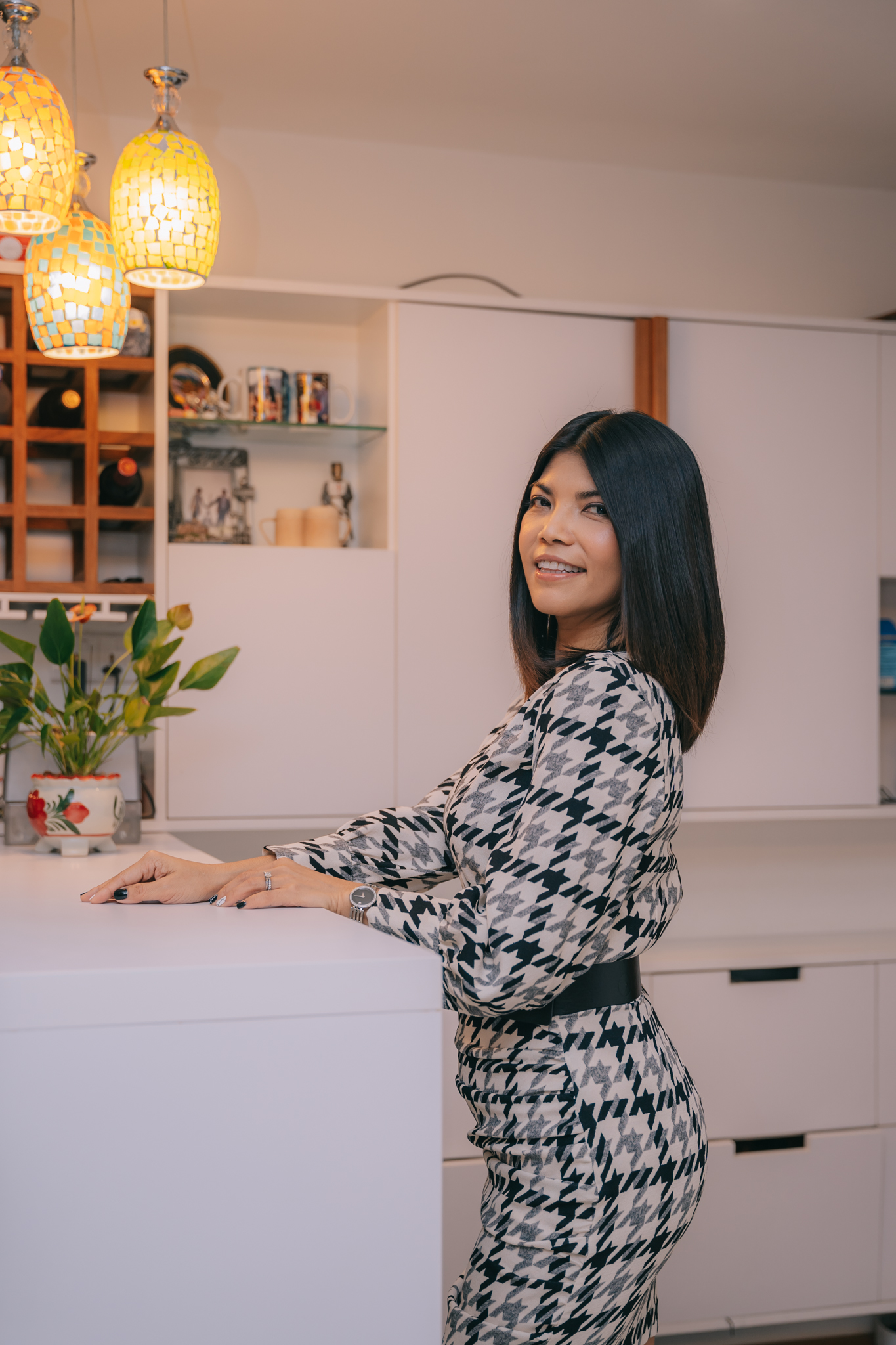
- Born: 18 October; Myanmar
- Education: Gibbs College, New York City
- Occupations: Film producer; film director
- Height: 5 ft 2 in (1.57 m)
- Spouse: Zenn Kyi
- Children: Noah Lynn Htet Kyi

Christina Kyi is Burmese film director and film producer. Her 2018 film Mudras Calling was released internationally and screened at thirteen international film festivals in thirteen countries.

== Early life and education ==
Christina Kyi was born in Myanmar. At an early age, she moved to the US with her family. She studied filmmaking at the Gibbs College in New York City .

== Personal life ==
She is married to Zenn Kyi, who is best known for his leading role in films Deception (Upe Dan Myin) (2018) and Mudras Calling (2018), Now & Ever (2019). They have two sons, the firstborn son died young and the second son was named Noah.

== Filmography ==
=== Films ===
- Mudras Calling (2018)
- Deception: Upe Dan Myin (2018)
- Now and Ever (2019)
