= P Moe Nin =

- ပီမိုးနင်း
- Born: Kyaw Nyunt; 5 November 1883; Thonse, Pegu Province, British Burma
- Died: 6 January 1940 (aged 56); Burma
- Occupation: Writer

P Moe Nin (Burmese: ပီမိုးနင်း; 5 November 1883 – 6 January 1940) was one of Burma's most prolific and treasured writers. His writing style differed from that prevalent in Burma at the time, writing concisely and clearly. Because of this, he is often regarded as the father of Burmese short story writing and the modern Burmese novel. He translated countless valuable works of general knowledge from Western languages.

== Life ==
=== Early years ===
P Moe Nin was born in Thonse, Pegu Province in British Burma. His parents named him Moe Hnin (Hail) because it was hailing when he was born. He studied at a local Roman Catholic missionary school when he was ten. Three years later, he moved to another Roman Catholic school in Moulmein, where he aimed to become a Roman Catholic monk. After three years of study, he was sent to College General, Penang, Malaysia, where he learnt public speaking, philosophy and logic which became his favorite subjects. When he was 20, he came back to Burma before being ordained as a Roman Catholic monk. (He was later ordained as a Buddhist monk by one of the most venerated abbots in Burma, Ledi Sayadaw.)

=== Personal life ===
Despite his prolific output and his long list of his self-help books, P Moe Nin never prospered financially. Poor his entire life, he was driven primarily by his desire to educate the Burmese audience, in both the Western classics and local knowledge. He studied a little of Burmese language until fourth grade. But his stepfather's library and teaching encouraged him to produce an impressive output of Burmese literary works.

His grandparents were wealthy but became poor after burglars and a fire on their banana field. Afterwards, they never recovered from poverty. His father was a hooligan and his mother had to work wearily for her children. He and his sister run away to RCM Roman Catholic Missionary School and head master Father Palwa adopted them. His mother was good public speaker, bright and clever. She was able to talk non-stop stories teller with humor. P Moe Nin himself acknowledged that his initiative thinking and writing were inherited from his mother.

Many personal crisis came together to P. Moe Nin's family. When his income is good, he spent it all on both good and bad things including gambling and drugs. Even though he had a good profession, he never worked a stable job. It was bad habit of his father who died when P Moe Nin was in Mawlamyaing. His mother's second marriage man was a Burmese literate. His elder son Kyaw Soe (a film actor) was killed by someone. His blind wife died after three months. He suffered stroke and his health was very poor.

In 1939, P Moe Nin's career was cut short when he crashed his bicycle on the way home from local festivities. Already in frail health, he died on January 6, 1940, due to complications from the accident.

=== Employment ===
Though his main profession was writing, he had to work a variety of other jobs to earn enough.

- He worked as teacher at Father Palawa's Catholic Missionary School in Thonse town.
- After he married, as an opium clerk at Danbi town.
- He published the magazine Myanmar Mate-swe (Companion of Burma) in his hometown, Thonse. But when World War I broke out he stopped publication and went to Rangoon to work for several newspapers.
- He worked as a pastor at Alon town Baptist Bible School teaching Latin. At this time, he reduced his Christian name, Phillip, to an initial. That name was used as another pen name. Later, he quit and worked for several newspapers again.
- Miscellaneous job such as selling traditional medicines, or selling German Imitated gold.
- When his elder son, Kyaw Soe, became famous as a movie actor, he worked for British Burma Co. as film script writer.
- At the end of his life he was writing for Journal Kyaw U Chit Maung's newspaper New Light of Burma.

== Literary works ==
P. Moe Nin is regarded as Burma's first "self-help" author. He wrote books and essays on assorted subjects ranging from health, psychology, education, religion and agriculture to biographies and political treatises. In all, he is credited for having written over 80 novels and nearly 700 short stories and articles.

His literature can be divided into four categories.

1. Pioneer period as an unknown writer under the pen name "Maung Kyaw". Novels written were Khin Htar, Pinle Kue Datpon, BA Maung Tintand Kachethal Mal Myint. There are also a number of educational articles.
2. Working for the Pyinya A Lin newspaper, with the pen name Paik San Gyi. The novels from this period are Nay Yi Yi, Pwe Sar Gyi Thar A Pha and Mya Mya, and Burma Day.
3. Written by pen name P. Moe Nin. His best novels are written at this time, such as Nay Nyo Nyo, Hay Ma Won Twe, Da Go Daw, Chit Pan Ngwe and plenty of short stories. Many self-improvement guide books also written.
4. Other works, such as the novels Kyun Ngwe Thaung, Kye Gyi Yazar, and Ta Ku Lat-Ta Lin Kwar, and uncountable short stories. Many social related books for nation, sons, daughters, men, women ..etc. were written.

He introduced Burmese readers to the American bestseller How to Win Friends and Influence People by Dale Carnegie. In 1923, he published The Book of Basic Politics. One of his most celebrated novels, Nei Yi Yi, is a Burmese adaptation of an English novel that reflected British colonial rule.

He could also be considered the country's father of instructional films. In 1920, the Cinema de Paris showed the country's first silent film, Myitta Nit Thuya. Based on P Moe Nin's novel Love and Liquor, the film educated the dangers of drinking liquor.

=== Posthumous reputation ===
Decades after his death, P Moe Nin is still relevant as in the days he was alive. A street in the capital has been named after him. In 2002, the Myanmar Writers and Journalists Association reprinted the third volume of his selected works. Re-prints of many of his books are still being sold in Burmese bookstores.
