= Kyi Aye =

Kyi Aye ကြည်အေး
- Kyi Aye in 2013, at her residence.
- Born: 13 December 1929; Yangon, British Burma
- Died: 28 December 2016 (aged 87); New York City, United States
- Occupations: novelist, poet, medical doctor, psychiatrist
- Writing career
- Period: 1947–2016
- Genres: Romance, Short story, poetry

Kyi Kyi Tin-Myint, known by her pen name Kyi Aye (Burmese: ကြည်အေး) was a Burmese poet, novelist, and short story writer. Born in Yangon, she studied at University of Medicine and University of Yangon. She is credited as one of the most influential Burmese writers for several generations, however, her works remain largely unknown outside Burmese language.

== Life and career ==
Kyi Kyi was born in British Burma's Hledan, Yangon district on 13 December 1929, the third child of U Han and Daw Ngwai Yon. In 1948, the year Burma regained its independence from the British, she began attending Rangoon University. She began as a medical student, but changed course in her third year, finishing school with a bachelor of arts instead. She received her BA from University of Yangon with a major in English literature. In 1953, she married a bank manager Tin Myint. After the marriage, she managed to work as a lecturer in the English Department of Yangon University and resumed her interrupted medical studies to completion.

She had begun writing poems and short stories since she was in high school. Her first short story, titled "That Night" (ထိုည) was published in Taya Magazine, which was founded by Dagon Taya in 1947. Her works were lifelike stories of the upper middle class. Her language was crisp and forceful. Her plots were frank and familiar. She used to write about the feelings of her characters without restraint.

She emigrated to the United States in December 1971, with her husband and children, where she obtained her medical license. She became a psychiatrist, specializing in Child and Adolescent psychiatry. She worked at a number of hospitals and institutions in the US and UK and retired in 2002. She died on 28 December 2016, of acute myeloid leukemia. Seikku Cho Cho published collections of short stories (100 local and 4 foreign) in 2023, July fourth times.

== Works ==
Burmese

Poetry Collection
* ကြည်အေး၏ကဗျာများ
Kyi Aye Ei Kabyar Myar
(Collected Poems of Kyi Aye)
1990
* ပွင့်ဒင်္ဂ
Pwint Din Kha
(The Moment of Apotheosis)
2016
Fiction
* မီ
Mee
(Ms. Mee)
1955
* နွမ်းလျအိမ်ပြန်
Nwan Hla Eain Pyan
(The Tiresome Return)
1958
* ဖုန်းသက်တိုင်
Phone Thet Taing
(Eternal Love of A Monsieur)
1960
* တမ်းတတတ်သည်
Tan Ta Thet Thi
(Longing)
1961
* ကျွန်မပညာသည်
Kya-ma Pyin Nyar The
(I am the Artist)
1961
* ကေဖွဲ့ဆိုသီ
Kay Phwe So Thi
(When Ms. Kay Composes)
1963
* မောင် ကိုကိုနှင့် မြနန္ဒာ
Maung Ko Ko Hnint Myanandar
(Maung, Ko Ko and Myanandar)
1973
* မေတ္တာမီးအိမ်
Myittat Mee Eain
(Lamp of Love)
1980
* အပြင်ကလူ
'A Pyin Ka Luu
(The Outsider)
1996
* မှန်၏မှောင်ရိပ် : စိုးနှင့်ခိုင်
Hman Ei Hmaung Yeik : Soe Hnint Khine
(Through a Glass Darkly : Soe and Khine)
1996
* မှန်၏မှောင်ရိပ် : အိမ်ဖြူလင်းသစ်
Hman Ei Hmaung Yeik : Eain Phyu Lin Thit
(Through a Glass Darkly : Bright and White Home)
2001
Short Stories Collection
* ကြည်အေး၏ ဝတ္ထုတိုများ
Kyi Aye Ei Wuthtu Toe Myar
(Short Stories of Kyi Aye)
1994
* ဝတ္ထုတိုပေါင်းချုပ်
Wuthtu Toe Paung Choak
(Collected Short Stories of Kyi Aye)
2007
Memoirs
* ဘဝအစွန်မှာ
Bawa Ah Swan Hmar
(At the Edge of A Lifetime)
2015

English

- "Working Elephants" (Essay), Back to Mandalay: Burmese Life, Past and Present edited by Gillian Cribbs, Abbeville Publishing Group, September 1996.

Burmese Translation

- Jr. LeGrand Cannon, Look to the Mountain, 1955. (တောတောင်ရေမြေ)
- Pearl S. Buck, This Proud Heart, 1994. (ဤမာန)

== See also ==
- Burmese literature
