= A1 Film Company =

Burmese cinema company

A1 Film Company is a Burmese-owned cinema company.

The company was awarded to the Myanmar Motion Picture Academy Awards.

It produced the 1940 film Chit Yay Sin and 1935 Japan Yin Thwe.

== Key actors ==
- Tin Maung (1913–2000), a two-time Burmese Academy Award winning film actor, director and producer related to the film company.
- May Shin (1917–2008), a Burmese actress and singer.
