= Saw Bwe Hmu =

Saw Bwe Hmu စောဘွဲ့မှူး
- Born: 19 October 1952 Sittwe, Arakan State, Burma
- Died: 24 July 1994 (aged 41)
- Genres: Rock music
- Occupation: Musician
- Instrument: Guitar
- Formerly of: Iron Cross

Saw Bwe Hmu (Burmese: စောဘွဲ့မှူး; 19 October 1952 – 24 July 1994) was a co-founder and the band leader of the Burmese band Iron Cross and a well known songwriter. An ethnic Karen Christian, he served as the lead guitarist of the band. Other band members included Chit San Maung (guitar), Khin Maung Thant (bass), Banya Naing (keyboards) and Kha Yan (drums). Lay Phyu, Ah Nge, Myo Gyi and Y Wine were the key singers of that band and R Zarni soon joined the band later. Composers Maung Maung Zaw Latt and L Phyu freed it from its reliance on such popular American bands as Metallica and won it critical acclaim and a wide public. He played the guitar at Success and Symphony music bands before Iron Cross was founded. He composed songs for Kaiser. He was a music critic, writing under the pen name Zar Hlaing.

He died at the age of 39 on 24 July 1994. He was survived by wife and ex-keyboard player Naw Phaw War and 2 daughters, Mi Mi Khe and Kabya Bwe Hmu, both of whom are successful singers.
