= Copy thachin =

Genre of music in Myanmar

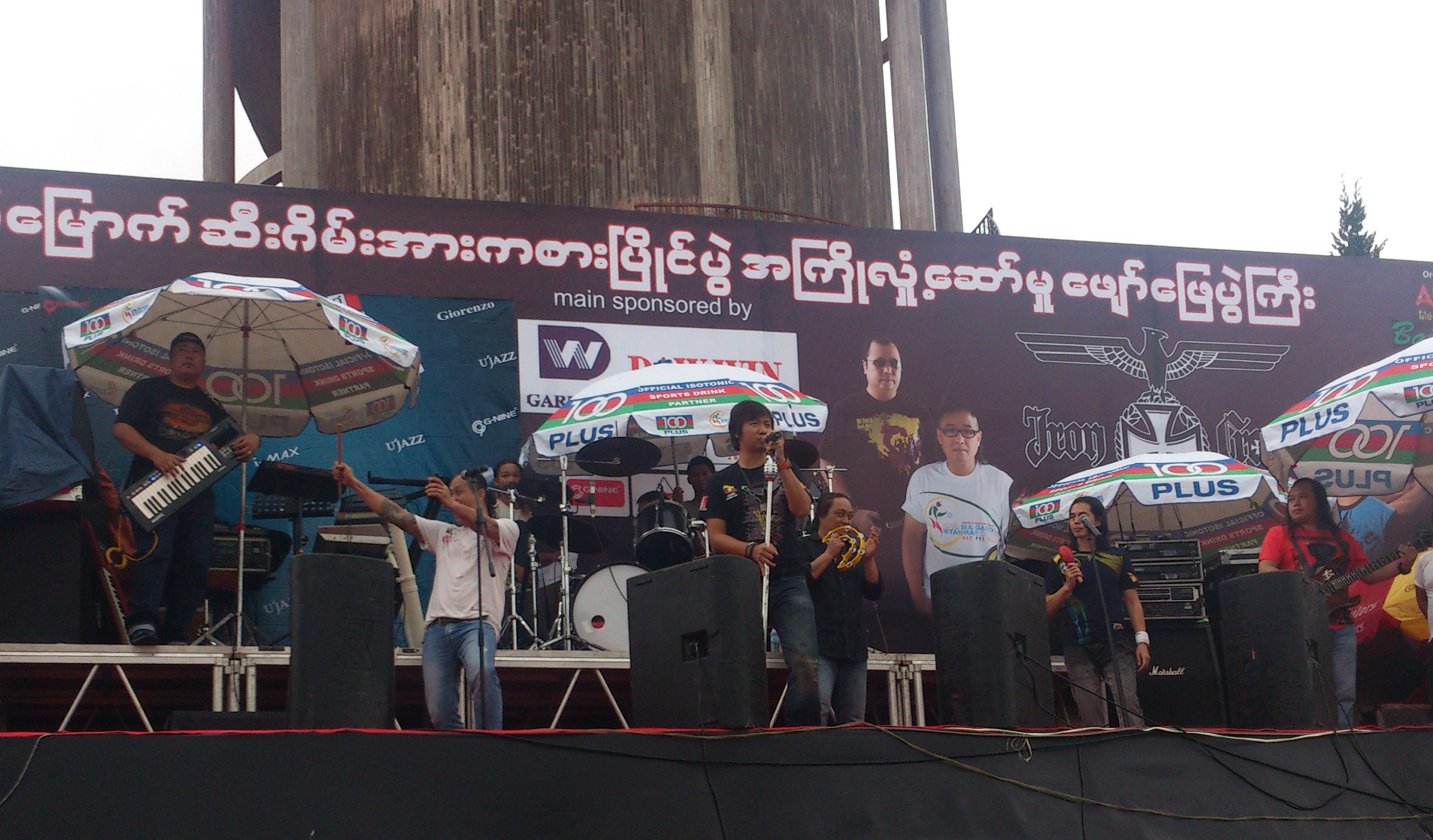
- Popular Burmese copy thachin band Iron Cross
- Etymology: "Copy song"
- Stylistic origins: Cover music; Burmese music; Western music; Burmese psychedelic rock
- Cultural origins: 1980s, Burma

Copy thachin, (Burmese: ကော်ပီသီချင်း, kawpithăchin: IPA: [kɔ̀pìθət͡ɕʰɪ́ɴ]; Burmese for "copy song"), also known as "copy song" or "copy music" in English, is a genre of music in Myanmar that originates from the early 1980s. It merges the melody and instrumentals of international songs with Burmese vocals. Proponents of copy thachin argue that the style is separate from cover songs due to it having unique vocal arrangements and lyrics.

A small portion of copy thachin songs are direct translations of their foreign counterparts, while the vast majority often have different meanings. Additionally, copy thachin is known to change locations from Western landmarks to local Burmese locations. Thukamein Hlaing, Min Chit Thu, Maung Thit Min, and Win Min Htway were known to use clever wordplay and innuendos to refer to deemed "explicit" or banned content such as gang violence or premarital activities.

As of 2023, fewer than 140 vocalists recorded the more than 3,000 songs that make up the copy thachin repertoire. According to available data, just 22 bands accompanied half of all these songs. Notably, the band Iron Cross worked on a total of 660 songs.

== Origins ==
During the Socialist Republic of the Union of Burma period, the ruling Burma Socialist Programme Party heavily blocked the importation of foreign media and restricted VISAs for foreigners, which caused the large absence of Western music for a long period. However, officials such as diplomats and scholars were allowed to bring Western instruments, songbooks, and cassette tapes into the country, which were often slowly spread through small circles, often through teenagers.

Copy thachin takes much inspiration from the heavily psychedelic "stereo music" genre popularized by artists such as Naang Naang and Sai Htee Saing. Playboy Than Naing's Shwe Thachin Myar or "Golden Songs" is considered to be the first copy thachin album. Released in 1975, the album had versions of songs by Western artists such as The Beatles and The Doors along with that of Indonesian artist Vivi Sumanti.

== Popularity ==
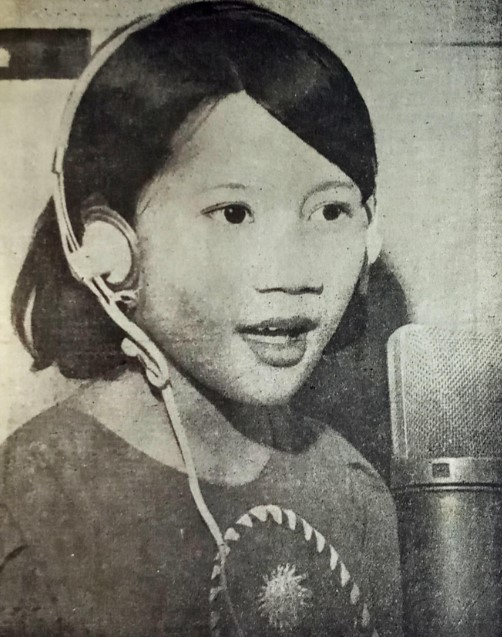
While most copy thachin songs are taken from European and American artists, Asian artists such as Vivi Sumanti were also covered.

Despite the government of Myanmar attempting to censor copy thachin throughout its history, it can widely be heard today in many public spaces. Most copy thachin was released during the 1990s. However, it has seen a level of decline in recent years. This decline can be attributed to younger artists taking pride in making their own unique music, the influence of music producers who have taken a disliking to copy thachin, and stronger copyright law being passed into law under the military regime since 2019. For much of the country's history, the Copyright Act 1911 was the only copyright law relating to artistic and musical creations. The law didn't include any protections for foreign media, it wasn't until Burma joined the World Trade Organization and signed the TRIPS Agreement in 1994 that the nation began to enforce foreign copyrights. There is a perceived stigma around copy thachin in modern-day Myanmar, as many musical critics and artists view it as embarrassing and as a cheap replication of original music.

== Examples ==
In the 1984 Burmese film, Achit Hlay starring Playboy Than Naing, he sings a song named "Sate Kuu Yin Eain Met" meaning "Fantasy Dream" in which the instrumental is directly taken from John Lennon's "Imagine". The title itself, "Fantasy Dream", is a reference to Lennon's 1980 album Double Fantasy. Naing Myanmar's "Kabar Ma Kyay Buu" is a copy thachin and protest song borrowing the composition of "Dust in the Wind" by American rock band Kansas.
