= Myo Gyi =

Myo Gyi မျိုးကြီး
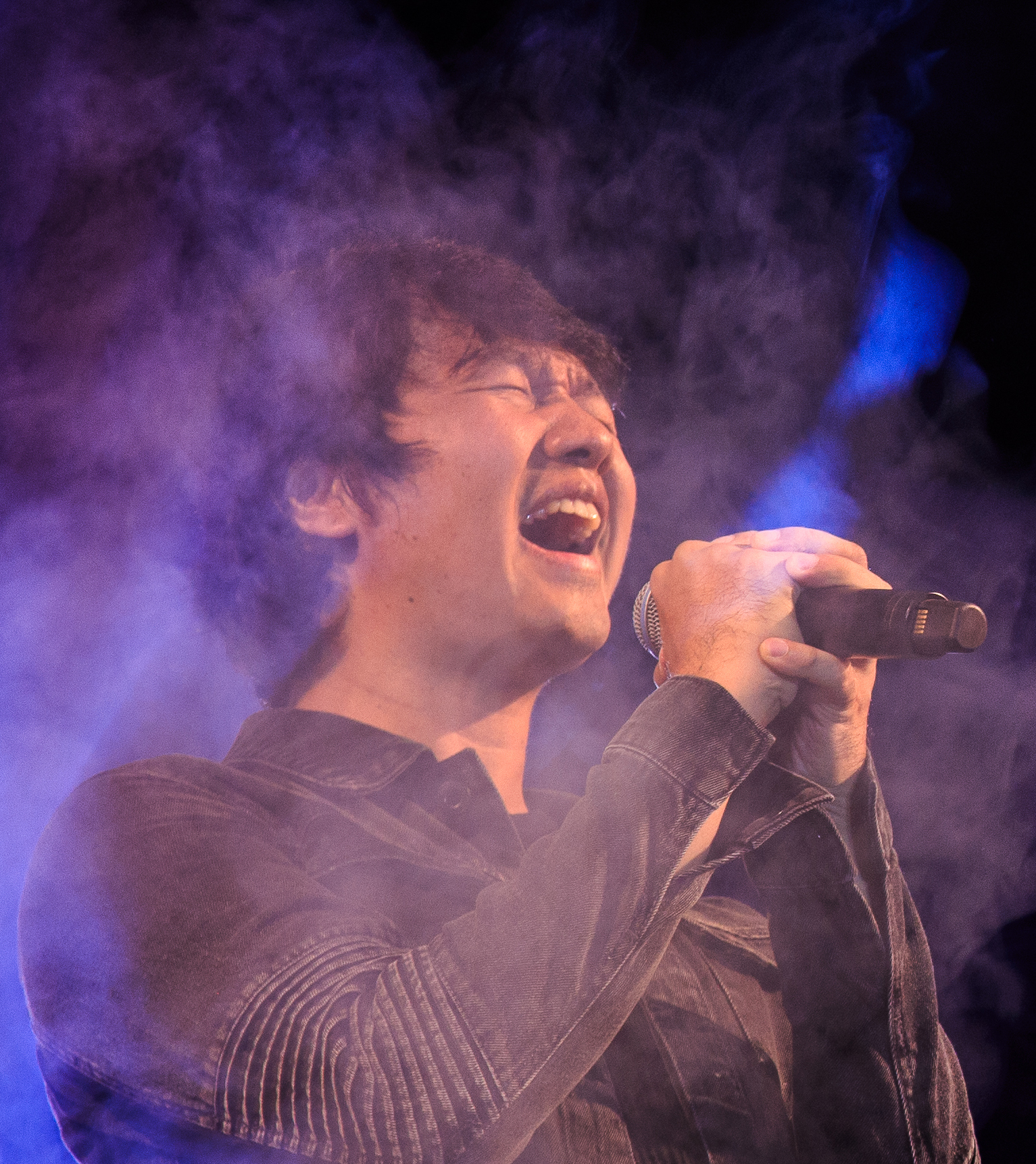
- Myo Gyi performing with Iron Cross Band

Background information
- Born: Myo Min Htay; 22 March 1976 (age 49); Rangoon, Burma
- Genres: Hard rock, heavy metal, soft rock
- Occupation(s): Singer, music producer
- Instrument: Guitar
- Years active: 1993–present
- Labels: Iron Cross Entertainment

Myo Gyi (Burmese: မျိုးကြီး; born Myo Min Htay on 22 March 1976) is a Burmese rock singer and guitarist. He is the lead vocalist of the popular rock band Iron Cross. Myo Gyi is considered one of the most commercially successful Burmese singers and regarded as the one of "Myanmar's rock icons".

== Early life and education ==
Myo Gyi was born on 22 March 1976 in Yangon to parents Tin Maung Htay and his wife Tin Tin Htwe. He was named as Myo Min Htay in his birth certificate. He has a younger brother named Sithu Htay, an engineer. He graduated from Basic Education High School No. 2 Hlaing. He studied zoology at the University of Distance Education, Yangon for three years before attending the final year at Dagon University, where he graduated with a BA in zoology.

== Career ==
He began his music career in 1993 as a lead guitarist in the rock band Ghost Rider. He later joined the rock band Iron Cross, which was founded by Saw Bwe Hmu, a famous guitarist and songwriter. Later Lay Phyu, Ah Nge and Y Wine joined the new aspiring band.

In 1997, he released his solo album "Kyauk-sa Myar". The follow-up album "Lay Byay" (The Wind) in 1998 was a commercial success, gaining him a large following, and planted him as a leading singer in the Burmese music scene.

Myo Gyi held his first one-man concert, "Live in Yangon", in 2007. He performed his second one-man concert "Min 90" (Live 90) at the Myanmar Event Park on 7 July 2015.

== Brand ambassadorships ==
From 2015 to 2020, he promoted Oppo Myanmar as a product ambassador.

== Discography ==
=== Solo albums ===
- Kyauk-sa Mya (1997) (ကျောက်စာများ)
- Lay Byay (1998) (လေပြေ)
- A-khan-na Zon (2000) (အခမ်းနားဆုံး)
- A-pyan Lan (2002) (အပြန်လမ်း)
- Hsant-gyin-bet (2003) (ဆန့်ကျင်ဘက်)
- Neissa Duwa (Nicca Duva) (2006) (နိစ္စဓူဝ)
- Live in Yangon 1 (2008)
- Live in Yangon 2 (2008)
- Yu-laik (2010) (ယူလိုက်)
- Pyaung-le-gyin Mya (2015) (ပြောင်းလဲခြင်းများ)

=== Collaborations ===
- 95 Myanmar Billboard Top Hits
- Saw Bwe Hmu Amhattaya (2)
- Do Ye Chit Thu Mya Ne
- Yazu Thit
- LMN
- Iron Cross Band Unplugged
- Iron Cross Band Acoustic
- Iron Cross Band 20th Anniversary
- Pinle De Ga Myit Mya

== TV show ==
- Myanmar's Got Talent

== Awards ==
- 2004 - Yangon City FM Award for Bestselling Male Vocalist

== Personal life ==
Myo Gyi married to Zin Mar Lwin, also known as Lone Lone Lwin, on 20 May 2000. They have two sons named Lin Thuta Myo and Ant Thukha Myo.

On 14 April 2020, Myo Gyi and his wife tested positive for COVID-19 after attending a church service, amidst the COVID-19 pandemic, which became the first COVID-19 positive public figure in Myanmar.
