= Marriza (singer) =

Burmese rock singer (1967–2025)

Marriza မာရဇ္ဇ
- Also known as: Marriza Breakthrough
- Born: Thein Zaw (သိန်းဇော်); 20 October 1967; Minhla Township, Magway, Burma
- Died: 23 January 2025 (aged 57) Yangon, Myanmar
- Genres: Rock music, alternative rock, hard rock, pop rock, and ballad
- Occupations: Singer, songwriter, musician
- Instruments: Vocals, guitar
- Years active: 1993–2025
- Labels: Independent and solo rock artist
- Formerly of: Iron Cross (Burmese band)
- Spouse: San San Win

Marriza (Burmese: မာရဇ္ဇ; pronounced [mà jəzə], born Thein Zaw (Burmese: သိန်းဇော်; pronounced [θéɪɰ̃ zɔ̀], 20 October 1967 – 23 January 2025) was a Burmese rock singer-songwriter known for his contributions to Myanmar's rock music scene. He gained recognition for composing and performing his own original music, standing out in an era when cover music was prevalent in Myanmar's music industry. Marriza was known for maintaining a consistent focus on rock music throughout his career.

== Early life ==
Marriza was born in Minhla Township, Magway Province, Myanmar (formerly Burma), as Thein Zaw, to parents U Thein Myint and Daw Khin Nu. He was the elder of two children. Marriza spent his early years in Minhla before relocating to Yangon to pursue a career in music. His early life and education are not widely documented, but it is known that his interest in music developed at a young age.

== Music career ==
Marriza moved to Yangon in 1993, where he began recording and performing his own music. He initially worked with the Burmese rock band Iron Cross, contributing his original music and lyrics. Marriza's early work, which included Pon Yait Mai Ga Yit Phyit album, helped establish his presence in the music scene.

He gained wider recognition with the release of his song "Long Hair, Tall Height, My Lover", which became popular in Myanmar. Marriza's music, particularly his rock songs, was noted for its originality. He was recognized for focusing on his own compositions, unlike many contemporaries who often performed cover songs.

In 2004, Marriza released an album that marked his continued commitment to rock music. While he experimented with other genres such as country music in his early career, he primarily focused on rock music in his later work, maintaining a style that resonated with his fanbase. His 2019 album, Oo Dan, was among his most recent releases and was well-received by audiences.

== Personal life and death ==
Marriza was married to San San Win, and the couple had two daughters, Lu Lu and Ye Ye. While he kept his personal life private, he was known to speak fondly of his family and their importance to him in interviews.

Marriza died on 23 January 2025, at the age of 57, after a prolonged illness related to kidney disease. He died at Bahosi Hospital in Yangon. His funeral took place on 25 January, and he was laid to rest at Yayway Cemetery. His death marked the conclusion of a significant career in Myanmar's rock music scene, where he was regarded as an influential figure.

== Discography ==
1. Pon Yait Mai Ga Yit Phyit (Imageless Graphic /1993)
2. Gambira Moe Kyoe ( Magic Thunder /1994)
3. Mait Sar A Twet Ga Yu Nar (Sympathy for the Devil / 1996 cover songs)
4. Kit Sa Nar (Lady Kissena / 1997 )
5. Shwe Yaung Kaung Kin ( The Golden Sky / Greatest Hits)
6. A Chit Nget Thar Kaung ( Loveless Prey / 1998)
7. Ko Yote Soe ( Mr.Ugly / 1999 cover songs)
8. Pyar Yae Myint ( River of Honey /1999 cover songs)
9. Shwe La Thar Ma ( Only If the Golden Moon Shines / 2000)
10. Myaw Lint Chin La Min ( Hopeful Moon / 2001)
11. Tay Char Par Tel ( Certainly... / Compilation Hits)
12. Shwe Yati (Pure Gold / 2002)
13. Zet Paung ( The End will Show Us How / 2004)
14. Set Net Let Ma Da Pay ( XII"=I' / 2008)
15. Ah Sinn Ah Lar Pyet Chin ( Breaking the Norm / 2010 with brother & daughter)
16. A Chain A Kar (There is a "Time & Season" for Everything /2016)
17. Oo Dan (Udāna / the Testamant (of Marriza's Faith) / the Proclamation (of Marriza's Dharma )/ 2019-23 unfinished album)
