= Lay Phyu =

Lay Phyu လေးဖြူ
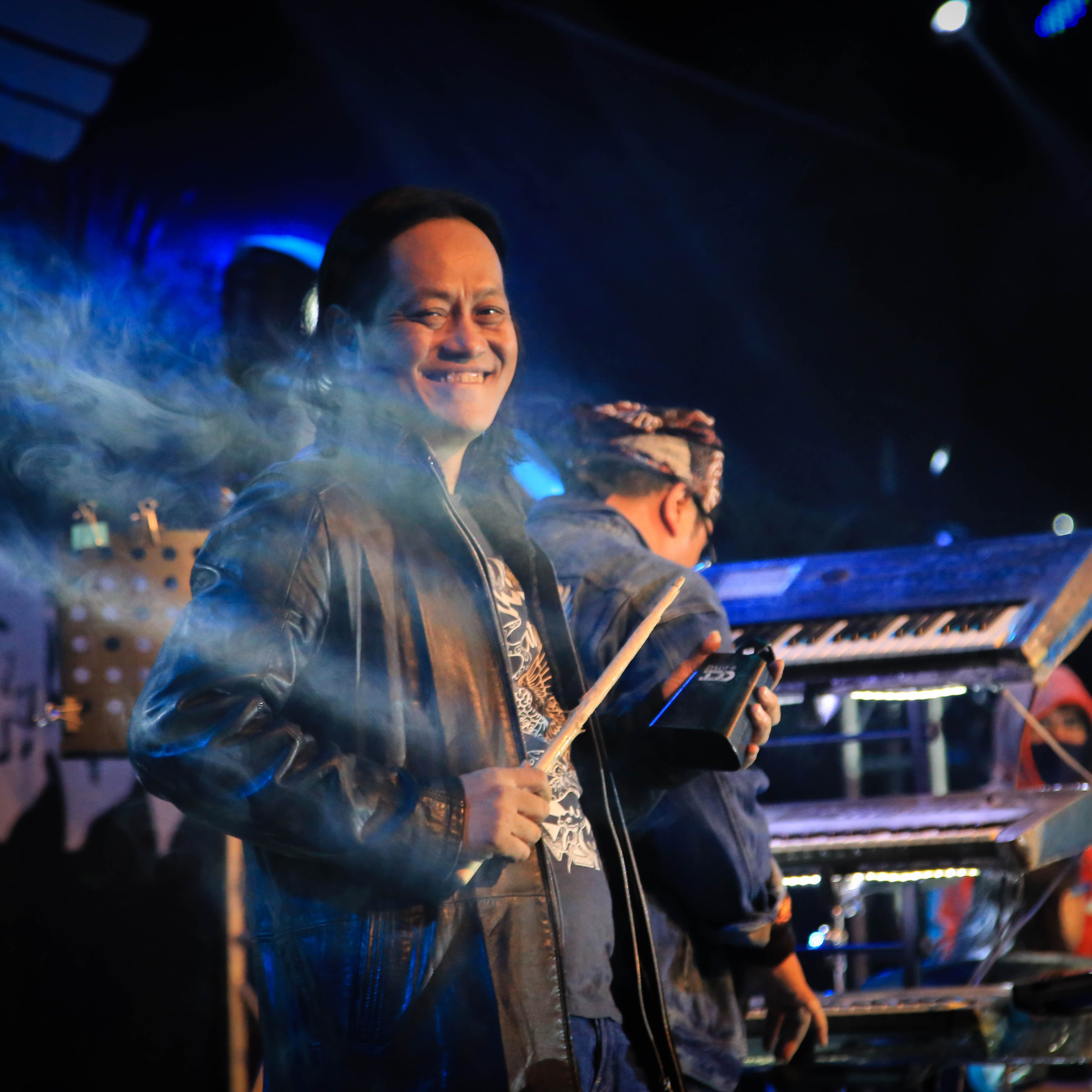
- Lay Phyu performing with IC in Taunggyi in November 2017

Background information
- Born: 19 May 1965 (age 61)
- Origin: Inle, Shan State, Myanmar
- Genres: Hard rock, heavy metal, soft rock
- Occupations: Singer, music producer
- Instruments: Guitar, drums, Bass
- Years active: 1993–present
- Label: Iron Cross Entertainment

Lay Phyu (Burmese: လေးဖြူ, pronounced [lé bjù]; born 19 May 1965) is a Burmese rock star and guitarist. He is the lead vocalist of the rock band Iron Cross. Lay Phyu is considered one of the most commercially successful male singers in the history of Burmese rock music.

== Early life and education ==
Lay Phyu was born on 19 May 1965 in Inlay Lake, Shan State, Myanmar along with his younger brother Ah Nge. He attended and graduated from Mandalay University, majoring in English.

== Career ==
While he studying in Mandalay, he met Y Wine, one of the aspiring singers from the Iron Cross Music band (a rock band in Myanmar). He eventually joined the "Iron Cross" band, which was founded by Saw Bwe Hmu, a guitarist and songwriter. Later, Chit San Maung became the lead guitarist after Bwe Hmu passed away. Later Ah Nge, Myo Gyi and Y Wine joined the new band.

Since his early career days, Lay Phyu became successful in his first album Gandarya Lamin (Desert Moon) and helped define the genre of Burmese rock music. Much of his music was inspired by bands such as Nazareth, Metallica, Van Halen, Scorpion, Dream Theatre, and Bon Jovi. Lay Phyu first started his path to fame when he covered English songs in Burmese. Later on, as he gained confidence and popularity in his music career, he began to compose a few of his own music. Even with the copy songs written together with his Iron Cross associates, Lay Phyu gave a fresh boost to Myanmar's Music Industry. His solo release Khana Lay Miaa has been noted for its "raw emotional power".

Lay Phyu shot a new music video in Ocean City, MD for his new upcoming album. The video was shot in late 2012 by Burmese director Danyar. The title for the track is called Kyo Hnint Dawt. Another music video, Yote Thein Pay, also featured footage of recording sessions and 2012 USA Tour.

== Charity and outreach ==
In 2008, when Cyclone Nargis struck the South Western regions of Myanmar, Iron Cross as well as many other famous artists formed a collaboration of songs as to raise funds to help victims rebuild their livelihoods. An organization from California sponsored the charity and published a song called "Hands with love". The collaboration then proceeded to perform "Hands with love" by written by Raggie, raising awareness to Myanmar locals of the damage that natural disasters can cause to people's social, economic and environmental factors. The same anonymous sponsor published and performed a song "a yay ma kyi bue" (Not the end of the world) in the same year, dedicated towards his twin daughters he had lost.

== Discography ==
=== Solo albums ===
1. Gandarya Lamin (Desert Moon)
2. Pinle Aw Than (Cries of the Sea)
3. Gandarya Pinle Lamin Aw Than (Live)
4. Gita Myitzuri (Music Entity)
5. Power 54
6. Kabar Thit Tayy (Song of New World)
7. Kyein-Za (Curse)
8. Thargaung (The Prey)
9. Einmet Kabya (Dream Poem)
10. Leitpya (The Butterfly)
11. Mummy Mya (The Mummies)
12. Khana Lay Mya (The Moments)
13. Bay of Bengal (BOB)
14. Diary (2014)

=== Singles ===
1. Dar A Chit Lar
2. Zar Ti Boone

=== Collaborations ===
1. 95 Myanmar Billboard Top Hits
2. Saw Bwe Hmu Amhattaya (2)
3. Do Ye Chit-Thu Mya Ne
4. Saung-Nay De Chit-Thu-Mya
5. Chit-Thu Dway Ye Di Mhattan
6. Madi Nhit Sone-Mhat-Mya
7. Iron Cross Band Unplugged
8. Iron Cross Band Acoustic
9. Tay Myone Nget Ye Hnit Nar Se (2)
10. Yarzu Thit
11. LMN
12. We Love the SEA Games (2013)
13. Six Strings Witch (Lay phyu-Chit San Maung)
14. Lay Phyu and Myo Gyi
