= Naing Myanmar =

Burmese musician (1956 or 1957 – 2025)

- နိုင်မြန်မာ
- Born: Naing U Myint; 4 January 1958; Rangoon, Burma (now Yangon, Myanmar)
- Died: 7 February 2025 (age 68); Thanlyin, Myanmar
- Burial place: Yayway Cemetery, Myanmar
- Citizenship: Myanmar
- Occupations: Songwriter; Singer
- Known for: Songwriter
- Notable work: "Kabar Ma Kyay Buu"
- Spouse: War War Lwin (m. 2005; death 2025)
- Children: Byu Har

Naing Myanmar (Burmese: နိုင်မြန်မာ; pronounced [nàɪɰ̃ mjàɰ̃mà]; born Naing U Myint (Burmese: နိုင်ဦးမြင့်; 4 January 1958 – 7 February 2025) was a Burmese musician notable for writing "Kabar Ma Kyay Buu", a protest song used during Myanmar's 8888 Uprising and again throughout the 2021 Myanmar coup d'état. His music has remained influential to Burmese artists and activists. Throughout Naing Myanmar's prolific music career, he wrote over a thousand songs, including songs for popular Burmese singers, including May Sweet, Maykhalar and the late Soe Lwin Lwin.

== Life and career ==
Naing Myanmar was born Naing U Myint on 4 January 1958 in Rangoon, Burma, as the first child of Ohn Myint and Ohn Myint. At the age of 16, he began pursuing poetry and music. At the age of 23, he composed Kaiser's hit song "Koyandaw Tathmulay" ("ကိုယ်ရံတော်တပ်မှူးလေး," lit. 'Bodyguard Captain'), a success that launched his music career.

Naing Myanmar was called "one of the Southeast Asian nation's most prominent musicians" by the BBC. In 2021, there was an Internet hoax that Naing Myanmar died after battling COVID-19. Although he had contracted COVID-19 while also suffering from coronary heart disease, he survived.

Naing Myanmar collaborated with artists such as May Kha Lar. In 2023, his son Byu Har, a notable hip-hop artist, was arrested for criticizing the government of Myanmar.

On 7 February 2025, Myanmar died from a heart attack at his home in Thanlyin Township, Yangon Region. He was 68. It was announced that Naing Myanmar would be buried at Yeway Cemetery in Yangon.

== Songwriting ==
Naing Myanmar's most well known song is "Kabar Ma Kyay Buu", composed to evoke the memory of historical Burmese martyrs and inspire contemporary protestors. It specifically references Ko Taw Hmaing and Thakin Aung San. The song is a copy thachin of "Dust in the Wind" by the American band Kansas. The song's title is variably translated as "We Won't Be Satisfied Until the End of the World," "The World Will Not End," "The World Is Unforgiving," and "Until the End of the World".

Naing Myanmar wrote the song when he was 30 years old. It was performed with the help of 13 additional student singers and three guitars. The song was disseminated using cassette tapes hand delivered to protest locations. Leaders such as Ko Ko Gyi have cited the song as being inspirational to the 8888 Uprising. The song has become an anthem of anti-coup protests and embodies revolutionary motifs such as lyrics about blood and the formerly-banned words "revolution" and "democracy.

== Personal life ==
In 1984, Naing Myanmar married his first wife and had three sons together. After their divorce, Naing Myanmar retained custody of his children. In 2005, he married his second wife, War War Lwin, and had a son and daughter together. The family resided in Yangon's East Dagon Township.

== Legacy ==
Naing Myanmar’s work, especially "Kabar Ma Kyay Buu", has remained a powerful symbol of resistance and democracy in Myanmar. The song continues to see use in political protests, including the 2021 anti-coup demonstrations, where it became an anthem of defiance.

His influence extended beyond music, inspiring generations of Burmese artists and activists. Despite government censorship and political turmoil, his compositions remain deeply embedded in Myanmar's cultural and revolutionary history.
