= May Sweet =

May Sweet မေဆွိ
- Born: Swe Aye Myint; 13 February 1962 (age 64); Rangoon, Burma
- Genres: Burmese pop
- Occupations: singer, actress
- Years active: 1976–present

May Sweet (Burmese: မေဆွိ; pronounced [mè sʰwḭ]; born Swe Aye Myint (ဆွေအေးမြင့် [sʰwè ʔé mjɪ̰ɰ̃]) on 13 February 1962) is a Burmese singer and actress, who is considered one of the most commercially successful female singers in the history of Burmese pop music. She is most famous for her Burmese covers of Euro disco and American rock and pop songs as well as classic Burmese songs from the pre- and post-war eras.

May Sweet was the dominant female singer of Burmese pop music from the late 1970s to the 1980s, bridging popular singers from the 1970s like Nwe Yin Win and L Khun Yi to Maykhala, her main rival in the mid-1980s, and to Hayma Ne Win and Connie in the late 1980s. She also collaborated with other male singers, most notably with Kaiser. She achieved immense popularity starting in the late 1970s with a series of repackaged Western cover albums called Panthi Thachinmya (lit. Apple Songs), written by successful cover songwriter Thukhamein Hlaing, and a series of classic Burmese cover albums produced by Maung Kyemon. Her covers, some of which were originally written for male singers, often became more popular than the original covers. She also had many successful "original" songs as she was the top choice of songwriters of the day. Her most famous song, or her signature song, is Maung.

At the peak of her popularity in the early to mid-1980s, the fourth daughter of five-time Myanmar Academy Award winner Myint Myint Khin also starred in a number of films where she appeared with leading men of the day like Pyay Nyein and Kyaw Thu. In the 1990s, she chose to focus on her music career, and stopped making films. Though the Burmese pop music scene had changed from slow rock/pop to Europop, techno, heavy metal and hip-hop, she stayed with her tried-and-true pop ballads. With her strong fan base, she was able to keep releasing new albums. Ironically, the next generation of female singers promptly covered many of her popular songs (both covers and originals) though none achieved her success. The songs remain closely identified with her. The longevity of her popularity and dominance at the top remains unparalleled in Myanmar where even most successful female singers do not last more than a few years. To date, she remains the only singer to have achieved success in both Western-style pop and classic Burmese music genres.

May Sweet left the Burmese music scene and the country in the late 1990s after she was married to a Burmese-American from New York City in 1997. She resides with her husband in Delaware, US. She continues to perform for Burmese expatriate audiences around the world. Later, she returned to Myanmar and sings her songs again and make many shows. Now, she is as a judge in Myanmar Idol.

== Early life ==
Swe Aye Myint was born on 13 February 1962 in Rangoon, Burma to Myint Myint Khin, a top leading lady of Burmese cinema and a singer, and Khin Maung Nyunt, a lawyer. Swe Aye Myint, nicknamed Mi Swe, was the fourth child of five daughters. she has British descent on her mother's side. Deeply interested in music since childhood, young Mi Swe was able to sing classical Burmese songs called thachingyi by 8. Her singing ability caught the ear of Ba Than, a famous Burmese harp master, and a family friend. Ba Than trained her to play the Burmese harp. Still at age eight, she first made her concert appearance at a Taungoo pagoda festival (Festival of the Twenty Eight Buddhas), singing Nwe Yin Win's famous hit Mimi Lay Ye Maymay Kyaung.

May Sweet graduated from the Dagon 1 High School in 1978, and received a bachelor's degree in botany from Yangon University in 1982.

== Career ==
=== Becoming May Sweet ===
Soon after her first stage appearance in 1970, Mi Swe was offered a chance to record a duet song with Nwe Yin Win, another family friend, in Nwe Yin Win's upcoming album. Right before the release of the album, Myint Myint Khin chose a stage name for her daughter. The name was May Sweet, the result of Burmese wordplay (called Zagalein) of the name Mi Swe (IPA: [mḭ sʰwè]) to May Sweet ([mè sʰwḭ]). (Zagalein is similar to vesre in Argentine Spanish, or verlan in French, reversing the sounds of a word or words to produce a slang or colloquial name.)

At 14, May Sweet's career began in earnest. She released her first album with Zaw One, one of the leading men of Burmese cinema at that time. Her follow-up album was with her mother, covering many of her mother's hits from the 1950s. Trained in classical Burmese music, May Sweet with the help of noted musician Maung Kyemon turned to old Burmese songs from the pre-war era (1930s) by the great May Shin, and updated them with modern Western music and arrangements. Her covers proved immensely popular, and she became a household name at 17.

=== Film ===
At 17, riding her popularity as a singer, May Sweet entered into a film career, getting the lead role in her first film. She made numerous films opposite the top leading men of the day such as Kyaw Thu, Soe Thu, Yan Aung, Zin Wine, Pyay Nyein, and Ye Aung. She never achieved anywhere near her mother's popularity or success in films, and stopped making films when she was about 30.

== Television career ==
She was involved as a judge in Myanmar Idol Season 1 (2015–2016) and Season 2 (2016–2017).

== Moving to America ==
In 1997, May Sweet married Andrew Lee (also known as Zaw Win), a Burmese American from New York. They first met during one of her trips to the United States where she was invited to perform at a fundraiser for a Burmese monastery. She left for the US soon after. Now working at a middle school in the US, she continues to perform for Burmese expatriate audiences around the world during her time-off. She and her husband have no children.

Sweet has twice been the subject of a death hoax. First in 2008 when news of her death was linked to a report purportedly distributed by Associated Press. Secondly in 2011 on the exile-run media web site the Irrawaddy that published a number hoax articles when it was hacked. The singer instantly issued a statement online that the news was a hoax.

== Album discography ==
May Sweet has recorded dozens of albums and hundreds of songs in many genres in her long career. (In early 2010, she released her first new album in over a decade.) The following is a partial list.

== Solo albums ==
1. Cho Thaw Tha Chin Myar ချိုသောသီချင်းများ (1980)
2. Chit Yay Sin ချစ်ရေစင် (1980)
3. Taxila Yae Hla Pyo Phyu တက္ကသီလာရဲ့လှပျိုဖြူ (1981)
4. Lay Yin Pyan လေယာဉ်ပျံ (1981)
5. San Francisco / Lay Yin Pyan 2 ဆန်ဖရန်စစ္စကို / လေယာဉ်ပျံ ၂ (1981)
6. Thel Nu Ywel သဲနုရွယ် (1981)
7. Chit Pwel Win ချစ်ပွဲဝင် (1981)
8. Pan Thee Tha Chin Myar ပန်းသီးသီချင်းများ (1981)
9. Thone Pin Lain သုံးပင်လိန် (1981)
10. Maung Chit Yae Lar မောင်ချစ်ရဲ့လား (1981)
11. Academy Pay Lite Mal အကယ်ဒမီပေးလိုက်မယ် (1981)
12. Nat Myin Pyan နတ်မြင်းပျံ (1982)
13. Myat Lone Sein မျက်လုံးစိမ်း (1982)
14. Mya Kyar Yan မြကြာယံ (1982)
15. Pan Thee Tha Chin Myar Pyan Lar Pyi ပန်းသီးသီချင်းများပျံလာပြီ (1982)
16. Imm... Ta Lone Tae Par Naw အင်း...တလုံးတည်းပါနော် (1983)
17. A Chit Kyaunt အချစ်ကြောင့် (1983)
18. Pa Zun Sate Ka Lay ပုစွန်ဆိတ်ကလေး (1983)
19. Yay Hmway ရေမွှေး (1984)
20. Hnit Ko Khwel နှစ်ကိုယ်ခွဲ (1984)
21. Pan Thee Tha Chin Myar 4 ပန်းသီးသီချင်းများ ၄ (1984)
22. Pan Thee Tha Chin Myar 5 ပန်းသီးသီချင်းများ ၅ (1985)
23. Eain Met 100 အိပ်မက် ၁၀၀ (1985)
24. Cho Lain ချိုလိမ် (1985)
25. Shwe Lae Tine ရွှေလည်တိုင် (1985)
26. A Pyo Sin အပျိုစင် (1985)
27. Ethiopia အီသီယိုးပီးယား (1985)
28. Hna Lone Thar Htae Ka Sai Htee Saing နှလုံးသားထဲကစိုင်းထီးဆိုင် (1985)
29. Thi Tal Ma Hote Lar သိတယ်မဟုတ်လား (1985)
30. Chit Coffee ချစ်ကော်ဖီ (1985)
31. Hoe Sayar ဟိုး ဆရာ (1986)
32. Shwe Yin Aye ရွှေရင်အေး (1986)
33. Radio Sweet ရေဒီယိုဆွိ (1986)
34. Hna Htet Kwan Ko Ko နှစ်ထပ်ကွမ်းကိုကို (1986)
35. Pan Thee Tha Chin Myar 6 ပန်းသီးသီချင်းများ ၆ (1986)
36. Hna Lone Thar Htae Ka Sai Htee Saing 2 နှလုံးသားထဲကစိုင်းထီးဆိုင် ၂ (1986)
37. Sar Chaut Yote စာခြောက်ရုပ် (1986)
38. Pa Kan Pyar Pyan Myar ပန်းကန်ပြားပျံများ (1986)
39. Hlwan Moe So Tae Chit Tha Di Pyu လွှမ်းမိုးဆိုတဲ့ချစ်သတိပြု (1986)
40. Mway Htar Nay မွေးဌာနေ (1987)
41. Lay Sein Tway Tite Nay Tal Tha Baw Paut လေစိမ်းတွေတိုက်နေတယ် သဘောပေါက် (1987)
42. Dote Yae A Chain တို့ရဲ့အချိန် (1987)
43. Soo Sweet Diary ဆူး ဆွိ ဒိုင်ယာရီ (1987)
44. Pa Zun Sate Ka Lay 2 ပုစွန်ဆိတ်ကလေး ၂ (1987)
45. Soe Hnaunt Byar Pway စိုးနှောင့်ဗျာပွေ (1987)
46. Bioscope Htae Ka Sweet ဘိုင်စကုတ်ထဲကဆွိ (1987)
47. Pan Thee Tha Chin Myar 7 ပန်းသီးသီချင်းများ ၇ (1987)
48. Yin Htae Ka Sai Htee Saing ရင်ထဲကစိုင်းထီးဆိုင် (1988)
49. Judson Htate Ka La Yate Pyar ဂျပ်ဆင်ထိပ်ကလရိပ်ပြာ (1989)
50. Chit Editor ချစ်အယ်ဒီတာ (1989)
51. Aerobic အေရိုးဗစ် (1990)
52. Twut Tee Twut Tar တွတ်တီးတွတ်တာ (1991)
53. Myar Ba Yin မြားဘုရင် (1992)
54. Ar Lone Kan Kaung Par Zay (1992)
55. Yin Htae Ka Sai Htee Saing 2 (1992)
56. Cartoon Zatlaik (1992)
57. Ar Lone Kan Kaung Par Say အားလုံးကံကောင်းပါစေ (1992)
58. Ko Ko Bar Loe Mone Tar Lae (A Chit So Tar) ကိုကိုဘာလို့မုန်းတာလဲ (အချစ်ဆိုတာ) (1992)
59. Oasis အိုအေစစ် (1993)
60. A Sate Ta Set Hnin Ta Set Nae Kan Kaung Thaw May Sweet အဆိပ်တစ်စက် နှင်းတစ်စက် နှင့် ကံကောင်းသောမေဆွိ (1993)
61. Yin Htae Ka Soe Paing ရင်ထဲကစိုးပိုင် (1993)
62. Choe Cheint Cheint Nyan ခြိုးခြိမ့်ခြိမ့်ညံ (1993)
63. Na Ban San နားပန်းဆံ (1994)
64. San Francisco (New Version) ဆန်ဖရန်စစ္စကို (New Version) (1994)
65. Way Lwint Late Pyar A Lwan ဝေးလွင့်လိပ်ပြာအလွမ်း (1994)
66. Sun စွန် (1995)
67. Yin Htae Ka Soe Paing 2 (1995)
68. Hna Lone Thar Let Saung နှလုံးသားလက်ဆောင် (1995)
69. Shwe Hmone Kywel ရွှေမှုံကြဲ (1995)
70. Cherry Lwin Pyin ချယ်ရီလွင်ပြင် (1995)
71. Eain Met Thit Ta Phan Mway Phwar Chinn အိပ်မက်သစ်တစ်ဖန်မွေးဖွားခြင်း (1995)
72. Khone Hpa Nat Ta Bet But Hpa Nat Ta Bet ခုံဖိနပ်တစ်ဘက် ဘွတ်ဖိနပ်တစ်ဘက် (1995)
73. Kant Kaw Myo Taw ကံ့ကော်မြို့တော် (1995)
74. Thaw Tar Ngway Min သော်တာငွေမင်း (1996)
75. Yin Htae Ka Khun Than Htun ရင်ထဲကခွန်သန်းထွန်း (1996)
76. Thu Ma Yae Kabyar သူမရဲ့ကဗျာ (1996)
77. A Thel Htae Ka Victor Khin Nyo အသည်းထဲကဗစ်တာခင်ညို (1996)
78. Pan Thee Feeling ပန်းသီးဖီလင် (1996)
79. A Thet Shu Kyat Tal အသက်ရှူကျပ်တယ် (1996)
80. Yin Htae Ka Sai Htee Saing 3 (1996)
81. Nar Lae Htar Naw နားလည်ထားနော် (1996)
82. Mercury Nya မာကျူရီည (1996)
83. A Thet Shoo Kyat Tal အသက်ရှူကျပ်တယ် (1996)
84. Sayonara ဆာယိုနာရား (1997)
85. Htoo Ein Thin Winyin (1997)
86. Yin Htae Ka Sai Htee Saing 3 (1997)
87. May Sweet Yae Pin Khwin Oo မေဆွိရဲ့ရင်ခွင်ဦး (1997)
88. Khun Sint Chit Kabyar Khway ခွန်းဆင့်ချစ်ကဗျာခြွေ (1997)
89. May Sweet Yae Yin Khwin Oo မေဆွိရဲ့ရင်ခွင်ဦး (1997)
90. A Kaung Ta Ka A Kaung Sone Tay အကောင်းတကာ့အကောင်းဆုံးတေး (1997)
91. Ta Saung Thit Pyan Pyi တစ်ဆောင်းသစ်ပြန်ပြီ (1997)
92. Super Sweet A Cho Ta Ka A Cho Sone Tay Myar စူပါဆွိ အချိုတကာ့အချိုဆုံးတေးများ(1998)
93. Chit Lu Mite ချစ်လူမိုက် (1998)
94. Cherry Lwin Pyin 2 ချယ်ရီလွင်ပြင် ၂ (1998)
95. Ywet Kyway Pwint Phoo Saung Oo Nan Net Khin ရွက်ကြွေပွင့်ဖူးဆောင်းဦးနံနက်ခင်း (1999)
96. Muya Maya Mi Shwe Nyar (2000)
97. A Kaung Ta Ka A Kaung Sone Tay 2 အကောင်းတကာ့အကောင်းဆုံးတေး ၂ (2000)
98. Maya Ko Ko Live Show II မာယာကိုကို Live Show II (2004)
99. May Sweet Nae Hna Lone Thar Than Sin Cho Cho Myar (2010)
