= Zaw Paing =

Burmese singer-songwriter

Zaw Paing ဇော်ပိုင်
- Born: Thetkethaung, Ngapudaw Township, Ayeyarwaddy Region
- Origin: Yangon, Myanmar
- Genres: Rock ballad, Country music, Pop music
- Occupations: Singer, Songwriter, Music Producer
- Instruments: Vocals, Guitar
- Years active: 1997–present
- Formerly of: Iron Cross (Burmese band), May Kha Lar

Zaw Paing (Burmese: ဇော်ပိုင်) is a Burmese singer, songwriter, and producer. He is known for performing rock ballads and country songs and for his smooth vocal style.

== Career ==
Zaw Paing was born and raised in Thetkethaung Village, Ngapudaw Township, Ayeyarwady Region. While studying at university in Pathein, he entered the televised singing contest "So Kya Mel Pyaw Kya Mel" and won in 1997. After the contest, he moved to Yangon and signed a record deal with Yadanar Myaing Music Production in 1998. His album, Myo Awin Nya, sold over 300,000 official copies, and nearly 1.5 million counterfeit copies.

His musical influences include Kenny Rogers, The Eagles, Bee Gees, Bon Jovi, and Metallica. Zaw Paing is known for his rock ballads and country songs and has shown interest in combining different music styles.

During his career, Zaw Paing has released seven solo albums and three duet albums, along with participating in many group albums. He has worked with singers such as Chaw Su Khin and May Kha Lar, and collaborated with the Iron Cross band. He has also written and produced songs for other artists.

== Personal life ==
Zaw Paing is married and has a son, Shwe Paing.

== Discography ==
- Chit Thu Ye Amaint (1999)
- Myoe Awin Nya (2000)
- Moe Kaung Kin Thit (2001)
- Amaw Pyay (2005)
- Shwe Yaung Nhit Thit (2008)
- Pin Le Myoe Pya (2012)
- Pyu Thu Athit (2017)
