= May Kha Lar =

Burmese singer and actress (born 1963)

May Kha Lar မေခလာ
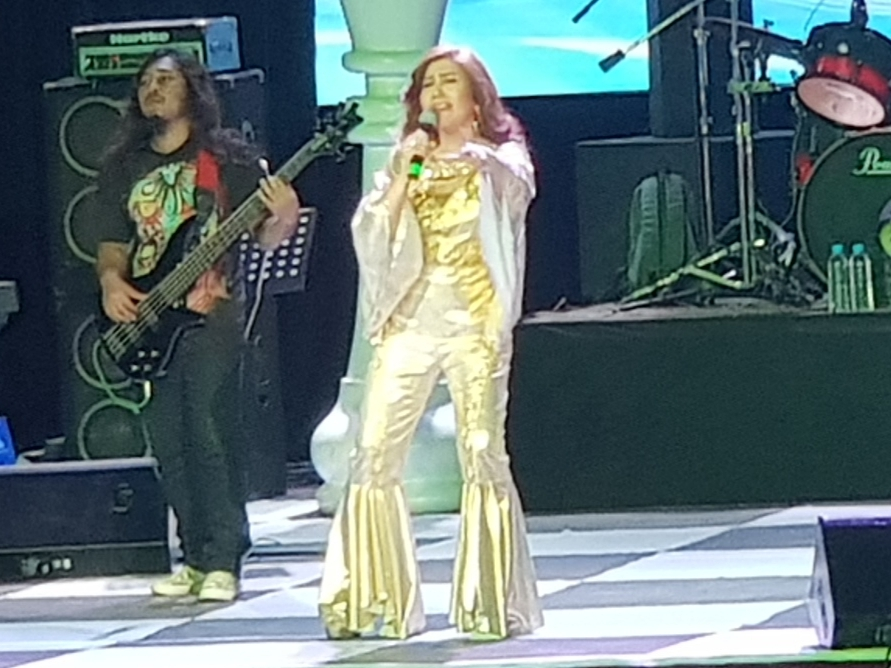

Background information
- Born: 2 May 1963 (age 62)
- Origin: Yangon, Myanmar
- Genres: Burmese pop
- Occupation(s): singer, actress
- Years active: 1980–present

May Kha Lar (Burmese: မေခလာ, pronounced [mèkʰəlà]; also spelled Maykhalar) is a Burmese singer who was one of the most popular Burmese pop vocalists in the 1980s. Her stage name is derived from Manimekhala, a Buddhist goddess. She is known for her Burmese language covers of Western pop songs as well as original Burmese songs.

== Early life and education ==
She was born on 2 May 1963 to Phe Phe Kyaw, a pilot, and his wife Phyu Phyu Shein. Her childhood pet name was "Nge Nge" (ငယ်ငယ်). In 1983, she graduated with a BA degree in the Burmese language.

== Music career ==
During her second year in college, she was encouraged by faculty to sing a cover of Nwe Yin Win's "Love Is..." (အချစ်ဆိုတာ) at the Yangon City Hall's Thingyan pandal. Myint Lwin was persuaded by her performance to produce music on her behalf. Following the success of her music career after 1980, famous composers like Kaiser, Naing Myanmar, and Win Min Htwe composed music for her. Maykhala's hits include "Leave Now" (ပြန်ပေတော့), "Loving That Much" (အဲ့သလောက်တောင်ချစ်ရသည်), and "Once at University" (တစ်ခါက တက္ကသိုလ်).

== Personal life ==
She was briefly married to a popular singer, Kaiser, in the mid-1980s. She has been married to actor Yan Kyaw since 1995.

== Album discography ==
Maykhala released most of her albums during her heyday in the early to mid-1980s. The following is a partial list.

=== Solo albums ===
- Pyan Pay Tot ပြန်ပေတော့ (1983)
- Dan Dar Yi ဒဏ္ဍာရီ (1984)
- Yay Thu Ma ရေသူမ (1984)
- Lay Yin Pyan Daisy လေယာဉ်ပျံဒေစီ (1984)
- Pyan So Chin Thaw Tha Chin Myar ပြန်ဆိုချင်သောသီချင်းများ (1984)
- Yaut Kyar Lay Phyit Chin Tal ယောက်ျားလေးဖြစ်ချင်တယ် (1985)
- Pyan Pay Tot 2 ပြန်ပေတော့ ၂ (1985)
- Fashion ဖက်ရှင် (1985)
- Pae Tin Than ပဲ့တင်သံ (1985)
- Ba Yin Ma ဘုရင်မ (1985)
- Su - Pyan So Chin Thaw Tha Chin Myar 2 ဆု - ပြန်ဆိုချင်သောတေး ၂ (1985)
- Ma Pyaw Chin Lo Kyi Nay Dar Kyar Pyi မပြောချင်လို့ကြည့်နေတာကြာပြီ (1985)
- Baw Lone Goal Thwin Kaung Tae Ko Ko ဘောလုံးဂိုးသွင်းကောင်းတဲ့ကိုကို (1985)
- A Thel Mee Sa Lite အသည်းမီးဆလိုက် (1986)
- Fashion 2 ဖက်ရှင် ၂ (1986)
- Ar Lone Ko Kyaw Tet Khae အားလုံးကိုကျော်တက်ခဲ့ (1986)
- Ba Yin Ma 2 ဘုရင်မ ၂ (1986)
- A Bo Gyi Lay အဘိုးကြီးလေး (1986)
- So - Pyan So Chin Thaw Thi Chin Myar 3 ဆို - ပြန်ဆိုချင်သောတေး ၃ (1987)
- Moe Kaung Kin Htae မိုးကောင်းကင်ထဲ (1987)
- Ant Yaw Ant Yaw အံံ့ရောအံ့ရော (1989)
- Chit Thu Let Saung ချစ်သူ့လက်ဆောင် (1989)
- 17 ၁၇ (1991)
- Let Thee Htoe Kaung Tae Ko Ko လက်သီးထိုးကောင်းတဲ့ကိုကို (1993)
- Chit... Moe ချစ်...မိုး (1994)
- A Shein Khat Pyin Pyin Baw Lone Goal Thwin Kaung Tae Ko Ko 2 အရှိန်ခပ်ပြင်းပြင်း ဘောလုံးဂိုးသွင်းကောင်းတဲ့ကိုကို ၂ (1998)

=== With various artists ===
- Ko Ko Yay Nway Yaut Pyi ကိုကိုရေနွေရောက်ပြီ (+ Zaw One) (1980)
- A Hpyay Pay Par အဖြေပေးပါ (+ Khin Maung Htoo) (1981)
- Ko Lann ကိုယ့်လမ်း (+ Khin Maung Htoo) (1982)
- Thu Ka Pyaw Tot Nway Yaut Pyi သူကပြောတော့နွေရောက်ပြီ (+ Min Thu Yain) (1982)
- Thone Bet Myin A Chit သုံးဘက်မြင်အချစ် (+ Playboy Than Naing & Pearl) (1984)
- Padauk Chit Thu ပိတောက်ချစ်သူ (+ Myanmar Pyi Thein Tan) (1986)
- Soe Lwel Tay 3 ဆိုလွယ်တေး #3 (+ Hlwan Moe & Khin Maung Htoo & Mie Mie Win Pe) (1992)
- May Khalar Nya မေခလာည (2004)
- Years 25th (2008)
- Thu Nge Chin Thone Yaut သူငယ်ချင်းသုံးယောက် (+ Kaizar & May Sweet) (2014)
- Hnoht-Ma-Hset-Ne Ngo-Gyin-De 1 (Lashio Thein Aung Tribute)
- Hnoht-Ma-Hset-Ne Ngo-Gyin-De 2
