= Mee Mee Khel =

Burmese female singer (1983–2020)

Mi Mi Khe မီးမီးခဲ
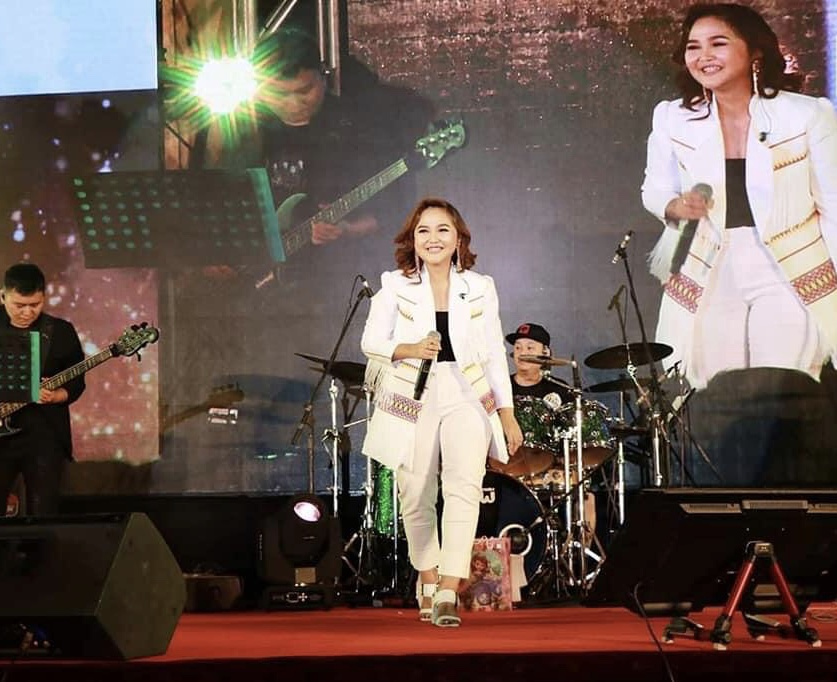

Background information
- Born: 1983; Burma
- Died: 16 October 2020 (aged 37); Australia
- Genres: Pop
- Occupation: Singer
- Instrument: Vocals
- Years active: 2000s—2020

Mi Mi Khe (Burmese: မီးမီးခဲ; 1983 – 16 October 2020) was a Burmese pop and rock singer of Karen descent.

== Career ==
Mi Mi Khe was best known for her hits, "Time When Love is Known" (အချစ်ကိုသိချိန်) and "My Reasons and My Own Luck" (ငါ့အကြောင်းနဲ့ငါ့ကံ).

== Personal life ==
Mi Mi Khe was born to Saw Bwe Hmu, a rock singer-songwriter and his wife, Naw Phaw Wa. Her sister Kabya Bwe Hmu is a successful singer. She was previously married to Htoo L Lin, a singer. She died on 16 October 2020 from breast cancer, at the age of 37, in Australia.
