= Byu Har =

Burmese hip-hop artist

- ဗျူဟာ
- Born: 1984/1985; Myanmar, (Burma)
- Other name: Min Oak Myanmar
- Citizenship: Myanmar
- Occupations: Hip-hop artist, musician, artist, singer-songwriter
- Years active: 2000s–present
- Criminal charges: Held on charges of incitement
- Criminal status: Imprisoned for 20 years
- Father: Naing Myanmar

Byu Har (or Byuhar, Burmese: ဗျူဟာ; born 1984/1985), also known as Min Oat Myanmar (or Min Oak Myanmar), is a Burmese hip-hop artist who was jailed in 2023 for criticizing the government of Myanmar.

== Life and career ==
The BBC has referred to Byu Har as "one of Myanmar's biggest hip-hop artists". He is the son of Naing Myanmar, another prominent musician. Before his detention, he was based in Yangon. He had been previously warned by the junta for producing music that was critical of the regime. In April 2023, he was denounced for boycotting the Thingyan festival in protest of the junta.

On May 24, 2023, Byu Har livestreamed on Facebook to levy criticism against politician Min Aung Hlaing for the frequent power outages in his city. He was arrested hours later. It was rumored on social media that he had been killed. He was held on charges of incitement, and was sent to Insein Prison. He was initially facing a sentence of up to three years.

In August 2023, Byu Har was sentenced to 20 years in prison.
