= Vivi Sumanti =

Indonesian singer (born 1953)

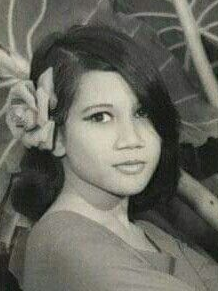
- Sumanti in the late 1960s

Background information
- Also known as: Vivi Sumanti
- Born: Vivienne Marguerita Tendean Sumanti; March 18, 1953 (age 72); Indonesia
- Genres: Pop
- Occupation(s): Singer, actress, model
- Labels: Canary Records

Vivienne Marguerita Tendean Sumanti (born March 18, 1953) commonly known as Vivi Sumanti is an Indonesian actress, model, and singer who was most popular in the late 1960s and 1970s. Sumanti made her musical debut in 1968 at the age of 15 when she was crowned Jakarta Pop Singer Champion. She successfully defended her title in 1969. She performed frequently with Henny Purwonegoro, Rosa Lesmana (as the duo Vivi and Rosa), and Frans Daromez.

She starting acting in 1972, where she played a fictionalized version of herself in Bing Slamet Setan Djalanan. While acting, she often supported films starring Bing Slamet and Ateng.

== Discography ==
=== Singles ===
Title	Release date	Notes	Reference
Vivi Sumanti Dengan Band Eka Sapta	1970		
Kalau Tjari Patjar	1971	with Rosa Lesmana	

=== EPs ===
Title	Release date	Notes	Reference
Vivi Sumanti: Djuara 1 Pop Songtress Contest 1968	1968	Created for the 1968 Jakarta Pop Singer competition, re-released in 1969	

=== Albums ===
Title	Release date	Notes	Reference
Bila Kembali	1969	Released by J&B Records	
Maha Patih Gadjah Mada	1969	Released by Silver Records	
Air Mata Kekasih	1970	Re-released in 1971 and 1973	
Dendang Sajang	1971	Released by Canary Records, with Frans Daromez	
Kalau Tjari Patjar	1971	Released by Canary Records, with Rosa Lesmana	
Vivi Sumanti & Lily Junaedhy	1972	Released by Canary Records, with Lily Junaedhy	
Vivi Dan Rosa	1972	Released by Canary Records, with Rosa Lesmana	
Bunga Bunga Berguguran	1972	Released by Canary Records	
Oh Ina Ni Keke	1972	Released by Canary Records, with Frans Daromez	
Kesempatan Terachir	1972	Released by Canary Records, with Frans Daromez	

=== Covers ===
Playboy Than Naing created a Copy Thachin version of Sumanti's song, Rindu, in 1975.

== Filmography ==
During the 1970s, Sumanti played in a number of films;

Year	Title	Role	Notes
1972	Bing Slamet Setan Djalanan	Vivi	
1973	Bing Slamet Dukun Palsu		
1973	Bing Slamet Sibuk		
1974	Ateng Raja Penyamun		
1974	Bing Slamet Koboi Cengeng	Vivi	
1974	Ateng Minta Kawin		
1975	Ateng Kaya Mendadak	Vivi	
1975	Ateng Mata Keranjang		
1975	Tiga Sekawan		
1976	Hippies Lokal		
1976	Ateng, The Godfather	Vivi	
1976	Ateng Sok Tau	Vivi	
1977	Ateng Bikin Pusing		
