= Lily Junaedhy =

Indonesian model

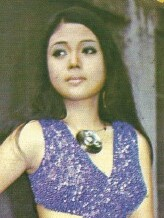
- Junaedhy in 1971

Background information
- Origin: Semarang, Central Java
- Genres: Pop
- Occupation(s): Singer, actress, model

Lily Junaedhy (sometimes spelled Lily Junaedhi) is an Indonesian actress, singer, and model. She was often associated (and potentially romantically engaged) with Rhoma Irama. She wore several of his clothing designs when she competed in the 1972 Fashion Show Festival in Semarang, which she won. She also competed in the Ratu Hot Pants-Djateng fashion competition that same year and finished in third.

Her music was often compared to Emilia Contessa. As she grew in popularity, she rejected offers to perform shows abroad in order to focus on her studies. She released an album with Vivi Sumanti.
