= Kabar Ma Kyay Buu =

Burmese protests song

Song by Naing Myanmar
- Language: Burmese
- Released: 1988
- Recorded: 1988
- Genre: Soft rock, Protest song
- Length: 0:03:56
- Composers: Kerry Livgren (for the melody, based on "Dust in the Wind")
- Lyricist: Naing Myanmar

"Kabar Ma Kyay Buu" (Burmese: ကမ္ဘာမကြေဘူး) is a Burmese song written by composer Naing Myanmar (also known as Naing Myint Oo). The song is a copy thachin (adapted song) that takes its melody from the 1977 song "Dust in the Wind" by the American rock band Kansas. First gaining prominence during the 8888 Uprising, "Kabar Ma Kyay Buu" has become one of the most significant songs in Myanmar’s pro-democracy movement. It was revived during the 2021 Myanmar coup d'état as a symbol of resistance against the military regime.

== Composition ==
Naing Myanmar wrote "Kabar Ma Kyay Buu" by setting Burmese lyrics to the melody of "Dust in the Wind", written by Kerry Livgren. The song is in a soft rock style. According to the composer, he originally intended to create an entirely new melody but did not have the time to compose a fresh tune due to the urgency of the moment.

The song was recorded just days before 18 September 1988, the day Myanmar's military seized power in a coup. The original vocalists were not professional musicians but a group of 13 student protesters. The instrumentalists were also untrained guitar players. Due to financial constraints, the song was recorded in one of the cheapest studios available in Yangon at the time.

Since cassette tapes were the most common music medium at the time, the recording was distributed using reused cassette tapes. Protesters duplicated and smuggled them to student gatherings and demonstration sites, where they were played to inspire the crowds.

== Lyrics and meaning ==
Although the melody of "Kabar Ma Kyay Buu" was borrowed, its lyrics quickly made it a defining anthem for Myanmar’s democracy movement. The song’s words express frustration with political oppression, honor fallen revolutionaries, and encourage perseverance in the struggle for democracy.

The song begins with a soft guitar introduction before the chorus is sung by multiple voices:

ကမ္ဘာမကြေဘူး… ငါတို့သွေးနဲ့ ရေးခဲ့ကြတဲ့ မော်ကွန်းတွေ… တော်လှန်ရေး… ဒီမိုကရေစီတိုက်ပွဲအတွင်းမှာ ကျဆုံးသော… ဪ… သူရဲကောင်းတို့ရေ… အာဇာနည်တွေ နေတဲ့ တိုင်းပြည်… ကမ္ဘာမကြေဘူး…

"The world will not perish... The banners we wrote with our blood... The revolution... Those who fell in the battle for democracy... Oh... our heroes... the martyrs in the land... The world will not perish..."

— Naing Myanmar

Later in the song, the lyrics directly reference Burmese independence heroes Thakin Kodaw Hmaing and Aung San, addressing them as "grandfather" and "father" to symbolize their importance to the nation's struggle. The lyrics urge "brothers and sisters" to keep fighting for democracy, warning against submission and fear. The song vividly describes the suffering and sacrifices made by the people, portraying their bloodshed as a necessary step toward a democratic future.
