= Rosa Lesmana =

Indonesian singer

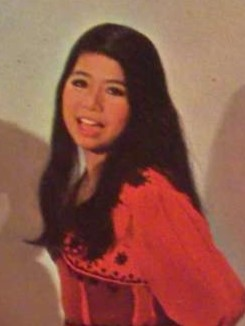
- Lesmana in 1972

Background information
- Genres: Pop
- Formerly of: Vivi Rosa

Rosa Lesmana was an Indonesian singer who made her musical debut in 1967, she frequently collaborated with Vivi Sumanti. In a 1968 issue of Minggu Pagi, Lesmana was described as one of Indonesia's most popular singers among youth. She won a contest in the city of Sumedang in 1970 and released her first single, Kalau Tjari Patjar, with Vivi Sumanti the following year.

== Discography ==
=== Singles ===
Title	Release date	Notes	Reference
Kalau Tjari Patjar	1971	with Vivi Sumanti	

=== Albums ===
Title	Release date	Notes	Reference
Kalau Tjari Patjar	1971	Released by Canary Records, with Vivi Sumanti	
Vivi Dan Rosa	1972	Released by Canary Records, with Vivi Sumanti	
