= Aung Cheint =

Burmese poet (1948–2021)

Aung Cheimt
- အောင်ချိမ့်
- Born: Kyaw Than; 1948; Tamwe Township, Yangon, Burma
- Died: August 9, 2021 (aged 73); Yangon, Myanmar
- Occupation: Poet

Aung Cheint (also spelt Aung Cheimt, Burmese: အောင်ချိမ့်; 1948 – August 9, 2021) was a Burmese poet. He is considered one of the greatest Burmese poets.

== Early life ==
Aung Cheint was born in 1948 in Tamwe Township, Yangon.

== Career ==
Aung Cheint is recognized as one of the modern poetry movement leaders, alongside Thukhamein Hlaing, Maung Chaw Nwe, and Phaw Way in Myanmar. His famous works include Gandawin Ma Ma, Khin Khin Pyo Yay Saunt Khè Tae, and Athèzwè Gabyarsaya.

== Death ==
Aung Cheint died on August 9, 2021, at the age of 73, in Yangon.
