= Dust in the Wind =

Single by Kansas

from the album Point of Know Return
- B-side: "Paradox"
- Released: January 1978
- Recorded: 1977
- Studio: Woodland (Nashville, Tennessee)
- Genre: Soft rock
- Length: 3:27
- Label: Kirshner
- Songwriter: Kerry Livgren
- Producer: Jeff Glixman

Kansas singles chronology
"Point of Know Return" (1977)	"Dust in the Wind" (1978)	"Portrait (He Knew)" (1978)

Music video
- "Dust in the Wind" on YouTube

"Dust in the Wind" is a song recorded by American progressive rock band Kansas and written by band member Kerry Livgren, first released on their 1977 album Point of Know Return.

The song peaked at No. 6 on the Billboard Hot 100 the week of April 22, 1978, making it Kansas's only single to reach the top ten in the US. The 45-rpm single was certified Gold for sales of one million units by the RIAA shortly after the height of its popularity as a hit single. The song was certified 3× Platinum by the RIAA on November 26, 2019, which makes it the second song by the band to reach platinum after "Carry on Wayward Son."

== Inspiration ==
The title of the song is a Bible reference, paraphrasing Ecclesiastes:

I reflected on everything that is accomplished by man on earth, and I concluded: everything he has accomplished is futile — like chasing the wind!

A meditation on mortality and the inevitability of death, the lyrical theme bears a striking resemblance to the biblical passages Genesis 3:19 ("...for dust thou art, and unto dust shalt thou return.") and Ecclesiastes 3:20 ("All go to one place. All are from the dust, and to dust all return.").

In a 1992 interview, Livgren states that the title was inspired by the line "for all we are is dust in the wind" appearing in a book of Native American poetry. It is also similar to both Psalms 18:42 ("I ground [my enemies] like dust on the face of the wind...") and the famous opening lines of the Japanese war epic The Tale of the Heike, "...the mighty fall at last, and they are as dust before the wind."

== Writing, recording and impact ==
Kansas band members comment on
the Top Ten success of "Dust in the Wind"
- Steve Walsh (in 1979): "I thought ['Dust in the Wind'] would be a hit from the very first. It [defies] the basic formulas - the Boston, Foreigner, Heart formula - that most [rock] groups try to follow. They don't realize that it's not the formula [that matters], it's the song."
- Phil Ehart (in 1989): "We're a hard rock band that's known mostly for a ballad we did [over] ten years ago. We're an album band & it's a fluke [if any] of our songs was a hit single."
- Rich Williams (in 2010): "Our hits are hits by accident. 'Dust in the Wind' & '[Carry On] Wayward Son' aren't formula songs. They were flukes."

Kerry Livgren devised what would be the guitar line for "Dust in the Wind" as a finger exercise for learning fingerpicking. His wife, Vicci, heard what he was doing, remarked that the melody was nice and encouraged him to write lyrics for it. Livgren was unsure whether his fellow band members would like it since it was a departure from their signature style. After Kansas had rehearsed all the songs intended for the band's recording sessions of June and July 1976, Livgren played "Dust in the Wind" for his bandmates, who after a moment's "stunned silence" asked: "Kerry, where has this been?" Kansas guitarist Rich Williams would recall that Livgren played his bandmates "a real rough recording of him playing ['Dust in the Wind'] on an old reel to reel. [He] just kind of mumbl[ed] the lyrics, [but] even [hearing it] in that bare form...we said: 'That's our next single.'"

Recorded at Woodland Sound Studios in Nashville, "Dust in the Wind" featured Livgren playing a Martin D-28 acoustic guitar borrowed from Williams: highlighted by the electric violin work of Robby Steinhardt, the track featured Steve Walsh as lead vocalist despite being recorded after Walsh had given his immediately effective resignation to his bandmates (Walsh's 1977 "departure" from Kansas would last a month).

In fact passed over as lead single choice in favor of its parent album's title cut, "Dust in the Wind" began receiving radio airplay as an album track, factoring into the underperformance of the "Point of Know Return" single which dropped out of the Top 40 from its Billboard Hot 100 peak of No. 28 the week the rush-released single of "Dust in the Wind" debuted at No. 81 on the Hot 100 dated January 21, 1978. On the Hot 100 dated April 1, 1978 "Dust in the Wind" reached No. 10—besting the No. 11 peak of the 1977 Kansas breakout hit "Carry on Wayward Son"—rising to a Hot 100 peak of No. 6 with a total Top Ten tenure of seven weeks. "Dust in the Wind" would remain the all-time highest charting single for Kansas: of the group's five subsequent Top 40 hits, only two would reach the Top 20, "Play the Game Tonight" and "All I Wanted" having respective Hot 100 peaks of No. 17 and No. 19.

Billboard praised the song's "evocative lyrics", "catchy melody" as well as the lead vocal performance and how the string instruments evoke the mood. Cash Box said that it has "solid melody, excellent vocals and harmonies and an impactful lyric.” Record World said that it "shows a new and pleasantly surprising side of [Kansas]," saying that "it's a subdued vocal duet accompanied only by acoustic guitars and an imaginative violin break." Ultimate Classic Rock critic Eduardo Rivadavia rated "Dust in the Wind" as Kansas' 3rd greatest song, calling it "a stark and gentle lament that bridges the group's transition from intimidating prog rockers to accessible hitmakers." Classic Rock critic Dave Ling ranked it as Kansas' 2nd greatest song.

Kansas also released a live version of the "Dust in the Wind" on their album Two for the Show and a symphonic version on Always Never the Same.

== Personnel ==
- Steve Walsh – lead vocals
- Kerry Livgren – acoustic guitar
- Rich Williams – acoustic guitar
- Robby Steinhardt – violin, viola, backing vocals
- Phil Ehart – hand drums

== Charts ==
=== Weekly charts ===
Chart (1978)	Peak position
Australian Singles (Kent Music Report)	52
Belgium (Ultratop 50 Flanders)	27
Canada Top Singles (RPM)	3
Canada Adult Contemporary (RPM)	1
Netherlands (Single Top 100)	22
French Singles (SNEP)	22
New Zealand (Recorded Music NZ)	36
US Billboard Hot 100	6
US Adult Contemporary (Billboard)	6
US Cashbox Top 100	3

=== Year-end charts ===
Chart (1978)	Position
Canada Top Singles (RPM)	24
US Billboard Hot 100	39
US Cashbox Top 100	37

== Certifications ==
Region	Certification	Certified units/sales
Canada (Music Canada)	Gold	75,000^{^}
Germany (BVMI)	Gold	300,000^{‡}
Italy (FIMI)	Gold	50,000^{‡}
New Zealand (RMNZ)	Platinum	30,000^{‡}
Spain (Promusicae)	2× Platinum	120,000^{‡}
United Kingdom (BPI)	Silver	200,000^{‡}
United States (RIAA)	3× Platinum	3,000,000^{‡}
^{^} Shipments figures based on certification alone.^{‡} Sales+streaming figures based on certification alone.

== Adaptations ==
Sarah Brightman recorded "Dust in the Wind" for her 1998 album release Eden. Cited by some critics as an anachronistic item in the operatic pop singer's repertoire, the song was recorded at the suggestion of Eden's producer: Brightman's then personal partner Frank Peterson.

Eric Benet recorded "Dust in the Wind" for his 1999 album release A Day in the Life.

German rock band Scorpions covered the song on their 2001 live album Acoustica.

In 2011, spanish Folk rock band Mägo de Oz covered and translated the song. The new song, titled "Pensando en ti" changes the lyrics; from a meditation about mortality, it's now a ballad about the desire of meeting a someone that may make your dreams come true.

"Dust in the Wind" was parodied by comedian Tim Hawkins, the parody called "A Whiff of Kansas" which is on the Pretty Pink Tractor album, and a video parody on the Insanitized live DVD. In 2016, the music video for the song was parodied on The Late Late Show with James Corden.

During the 8888 Uprising, Burmese composer Naing Myanmar penned "Kabar Ma Kyay Buu" (ကမ္ဘာမကျေဘူး), rendered in English as "We Won't Be Satisfied till the End of the World" as a protest song. Set to the tune of "Dust in the Wind," the song quickly gained popularity across the country, as an emotional appeal for freedom. The song was recorded and distributed on cassette tapes, reaching millions of Burmese eventually becoming an anthem of the 8888 Uprising. In the aftermath of the 2021 Myanmar coup d'etat, the country's nascent civil disobedience movement has revitalized this song, performing it during protests and acts of civil disobedience.

In 2025, Corey Taylor covered the song featuring Bad Omens and Aaron Gilhuis.

== Appearances in other media ==
"Dust in the Wind" was featured near the end of the Highlander: The Series 1993 episode "The Darkness" (Season 2 Episode 4) as lead character Duncan MacLeod is mourning the death of his fiancée Tessa who was murdered in the episode.

The song was featured in Final Destination 5, used as a red herring on every character's deaths.

A rendition is performed by Will Ferrell during a graveside funeral for fraternity brother Joseph "Blue" Pulaski in the 2003 American comedy film Old School. He concludes by exclaiming "You're my boy, Blue! You're my boy!"

The song is also featured in the Smiling Friends episode "Le Voyage Incroyable de Monsieur Grenouille", where the character Mr. Frog sings it at a karaoke bar.
