= Maung Thit Min =

- မောင်သစ်မင်း
- Born: Dewa; 6 June 1953; Rangoon, Burma
- Died: 5 June 2011 (aged 57); Samitivej Hospital, Bangkok, Thailand
- Occupations: Composer, writer
- Spouse: Aye Aye San
- Children: 3 sons

Maung Thit Min, born Dewa (6 June 1953–5 June 2011) was a prominent Burmese songwriter, composer and writer. Along with Thukhamein Hlaing, Win Min Htwe, and Min Chit Thu, he was considered one of the "Four Kings" (မင်းလေးမင်း) of Burmese songwriting.

His father Colonel Tin Soe was a member of Burma's Revolutionary Council (RC). He is a second son of U Tin Soe and Daw Mya Mya Than. He studied his secondary education through St. Paul High School (State High School No. 6 Botataung, Yangon). He began his writing career in 1971 and wrote fictional works including The Sun Rises in the East and Sets in the West (အရှေ့နေထွက် အနောက်နေဝင်), An Untold Story (မပြောကောင်းတဲ့အကြောင်းလေးတစ်ခု), Hug Me (ဖက်ထားစမ်းအချစ်ကလေးရယ်) and Tomorrow is Blue (မနက်ဖြန်သည် အပြာရောင်). He began writing and composing lyrics for musicians, with his first release being an album for Soe Paing in 1974.

In November 2010, he was diagnosed with colon cancer. He died on 5 June 2011 in Bangkok's Samitivej Srinakarin Hospital.
