= Iron Cross (Burmese band) =

Rock band from Myanmar

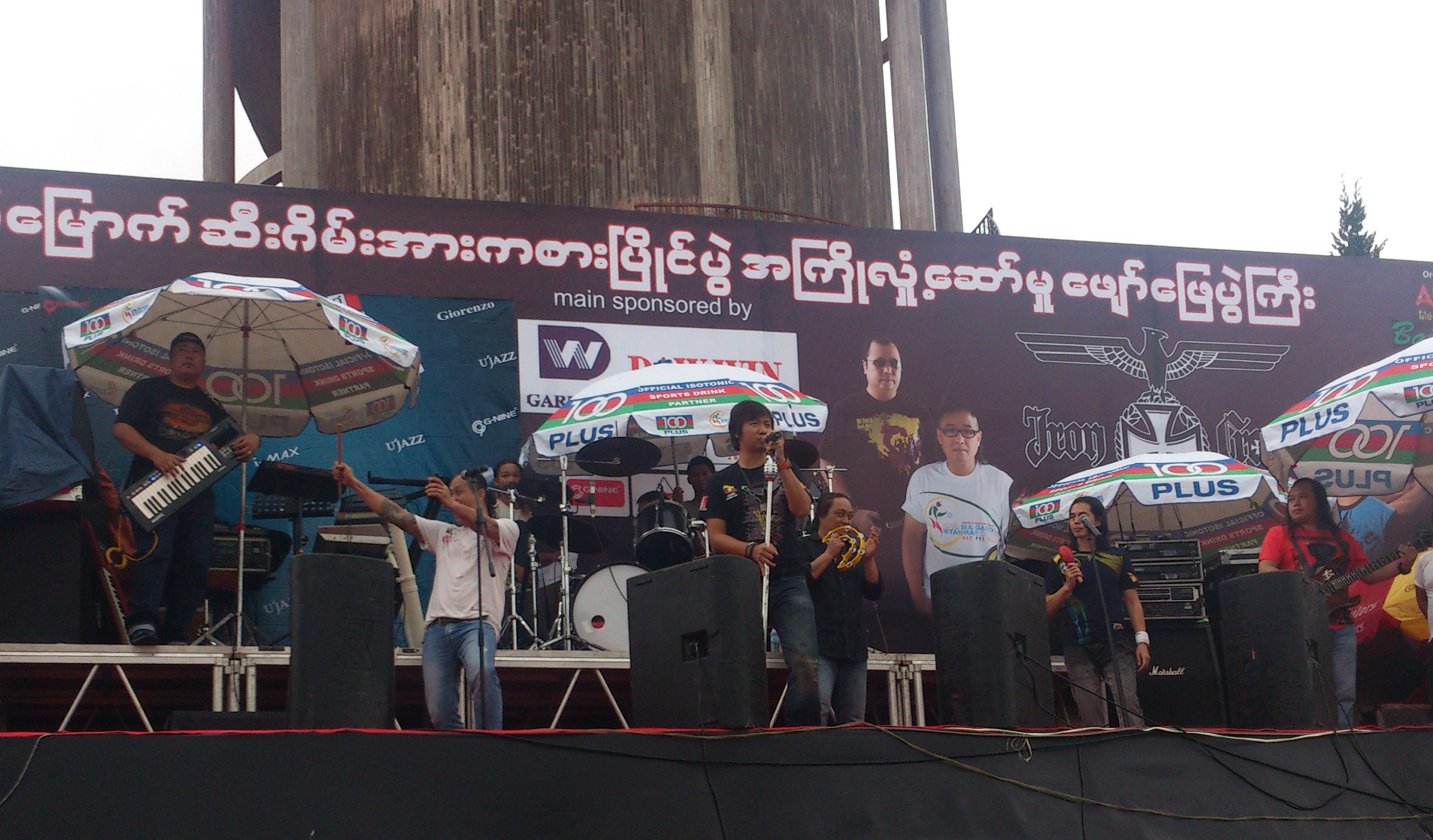
- Iron Cross band performing in May 2013

Background information
- Also known as: IC
- Origin: Yangon, Myanmar
- Genres: Rock
- Years active: 1989-present
- Members: Lay Phyu (Vocals); Myo Gyi (Vocals); Ah Nge (Vocals); Y Wine (Vocals); Chit San Maung (Lead Guitarist); Khin Maung Thant (Bass Guitarist); Banyar Naing (Keyboard Player); Kha Yan (Drummer)
- Past members: Saw Bwe Hmu (Lead Guitarist); R Zarni (Vocals); Zaw Paing (Vocals); Htun Htun IC (Vocals); Marriza

Iron Cross (Burmese: အိုင်းရွန်းခရောစ့်; abbreviated as IC) is a rock band in Myanmar formed by lead guitarist Saw Bwe Hmu. As of 2015, IC's band members included Chit San Maung (lead guitarist), Khin Maung Thant (bass guitarist), Banyar Naing (keyboards player), and Kha Yan (drummer). Iron Cross has been featured in numerous studio albums for Myanmar's singers. Lay Phyu, Myo Gyi, Ah Nge and Y Wine, who have since launched solo careers, remain IC's lead vocalists.

== Symbol ==
The band's symbol depicts an eagle and a metal cross, and is in a way, similar to the Parteiadler used as a Nazi party emblem. As a result, the international community in the past, kept an eye on the band. But lead guitarist Chit San Maung said that the band had not known the symbol was a taboo.

== History ==
=== Beginnings ===
The band, initially named 'Holy Cross,' was formed in 1990. The band changed its name to 'Iron Cross' to draw a wider audience. A few months after disbanding the band Symphony, Saw Bwe Hmu formed Iron Cross with his guitar student Chit San Maung, keyboard player Banyar Naing (from the Moe Thout Pan band, he first joined IC as temporary / session player, after a year or two, he joined as permanent player), the former New Waves band players; bassist Khin Maung Thant and drummer Kha Yan. In its early days, Saw Bwe Hmu allows his all members to play as a session player. But his best friend Dr. Ko Ko Lwin who is currently manager of IC, talked all members not to play session anymore at their meeting. In 1992, Lay Phyu came to Yangon from Taunggyi to record his first album and then he played it with IC. The emergence of Lay Phyu brought success and fame to the band. Later, Lay Phyu's brother Ah Nge joined and then Y Wine. Myo Gyi, the guitar student of Chit San Maung, was the last to join to IC. All the four subsequently began solo careers with IC but continued to perform together at live show performances.

=== 2008 to present ===
IC has also toured globally, including United States, Japan, South Korea, Singapore and a few European countries to entertain overseas Burmese communities, or to fundraise for charities.

In 2008, they participated in a big event held in Japan, performing with different bands of ASEAN countries. In December 2008, in the aftermath of Cyclone Nargis, IC staged a concert fundraiser that entertained 50,000 fans, becoming Myanmar's largest concert audience at that point. $100,000 were fundraised for the victims of the storm-hit areas.

In 2010, IC held a live concert at Thuwunna National Indoor Stadium to celebrate their 20th anniversary.

In 2015, they raised funds for Aung San Suu Kyi's Education Foundation, staging a music performance.

== Band members ==
=== Current members ===
- Lead guitar – Chit San Maung (1989–present)
- Bass guitar – Khin Maung Thant (1989–present)
- Keyboard – Banyar Naing (1989–present), started as session player helped to play for IC.
- Drums – Kha Yan (1989–present)

=== Additional members ===
- Lead vocals, backup vocals, percussion – Lay Phyu, Ah Nge, Myo Gyi, Y Wine
- Manager – Dr. Ko Ko Lwin (Former Manager and now he is no longer part of the band)

=== Former members ===
- Saw Bwe Hmu – lead guitar (1989–1994)
- Zaw Paing
- Marriza (singer)
- R Zarni
- Htun Htun IC
