= Connie (Burmese singer) =

Burmese singer

Connie ကော်နီ
- Born: Yadana Tun; 21 December 1967 (age 58); Mingaladon, Rangoon, Burma
- Genres: Burmese pop, Burmese heavy metal
- Occupations: singer, actress
- Years active: 1986–1990s
- Formerly of: New Wave band

Connie (Burmese: ကော်နီ, Burmese pronunciation: [kɔ̀nì]; born Yadana Tun (ရတနာထွန်း, [jədənà tʰʊ́ɰ̃]) on 21 December 1967) is a Burmese singer, known for her Burmese language covers of American heavy metal and pop songs. She was most popular in the late 1980s and early 1990s.

Connie got her start as a background vocalist for the New Wave band. In the mid-1980s, she was signed by successful cover songwriter Thukhamein Hlaing for three albums. She released her first album, Tarzan, in 1986, and achieved success with her follow-up album Ninja.

== Political activities ==
Following the 2021 Myanmar coup d'état, Connie was active in the anti-coup movement through social media. On 3 April 2021, warrants for her arrest were issued under section 505 (a) of the penal code by the State Administration Council for speaking out against the military coup. Along with several other celebrities, she was charged with calling for participation in the Civil Disobedience Movement (CDM) and damaging the state's ability to govern, with supporting the Committee Representing Pyidaungsu Hluttaw, and with generally inciting the people to disturb the peace and stability of the nation.

== Discography ==
The following is a partial list of Connie's albums.

- Tarzan တာဇံ (1986)
- Ninja နင်းဂျား (1987)
- Diana ဒိုင်ယာနာ (1988)
- Ta Seint Seint Yin Htae Mal တစိမ့်စိမ့်ရင်ထဲမယ် (1988)
- Tarzan/Ninja Let Yway Sin တာဇံ/နင်းဂျား လက်ရွေးစင် (1989)
- Kan Kaung Thu Lay ကံကောင်းသူလေး (1989)
- Pyar Yay ပျားရည် (1990)
- A Pyin Sar Thatu Myar အပြင်းစားသတ္တုများ (1992)
- Lu Nge Lay Ta Yaut A Kyaung လူငယ်လေးတစ်ယောက်အကြောင်း (1993)
- Kan Dar Ya Tha Chin ကန္တာရသီချင်း (1994)
- Kaung Kin Kha Yee ကောင်းကင်ခရီး (1994)
- Ko Paing Than Sin Number 3 ကိုယ်ပိုင်သံစဉ် နံပါတ် (၃) (1995)
- A Date Pal Shi Thaw Lu အဓိပ္ပာယ်ရှိသောလူ (1995)
- A Pyin Sar Thatu Myar 2 အပြင်းစားသတ္တုများ ၂ (1997)
- A Taung Pan Par Yin Min Si Ko အတောင်ပံပါရင်မင်းဆီကို (1998)
- Chit Tal ချစ်တယ် (1999)
- Sone Chin Tal ဆုံချင်တယ် (1999)
- A Thet Shin Chin Tha Chin အသက်ရှင်ခြင်းသီချင်း (2003)
- Colourful Connie (Live Show) ဆေးရောင်စုံကော်နီ Live Show (2006)
