= Thukhamein Hlaing =

Burmese poet and songwriter

- သုခမိန်လှိုင်
- Born: 1948 (age 76–77); Burma
- Other names: Siddhattha Hlaing
- Occupations: Songwriter; poet; writer

Thukhamein Hlaing (Burmese: သုခမိန်လှိုင်, b. 1948), also known by his pen name Siddhattha Hlaing (သိဒ္ဓတ္ထလှိုင်) is a Burmese poet, songwriter, and writer. Along with contemporaries like Aung Cheint, he helped revolutionised contemporary Burmese poetry, by pivoting away from classical forms of Burmese poetry. He is a prolific pop music songwriter, closely associated with musicians like Kaiser, Connie, Hay Mar Nay Win, and May Sweet. Along with Maung Thit Min, Win Min Tway, and Min Chit Thu, he is considered one of the "Four Kings" (မင်းလေးမင်း) of Burmese songwriting.

== Personal life ==
His daughter, San Yae (born c. 1989), is a singer.
