= Y Wine =

Burmese rock singer and lead vocalist of Iron Cross

Y Wine ဝိုင်ဝိုင်း
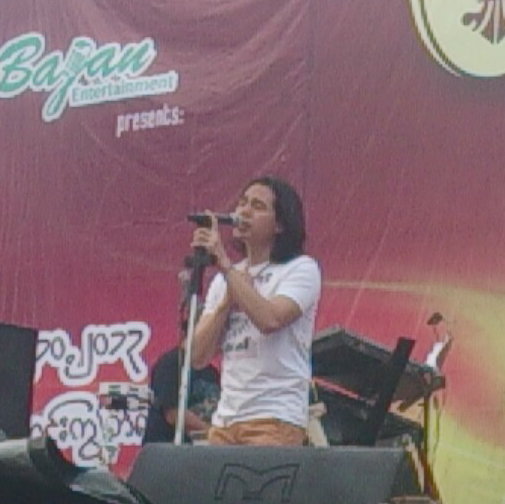
- Y Wine in 2013

Background information
- Born: Myitkyina, Myanmar
- Origin: Myitkyina
- Genres: pop music, asian pop, pop rock
- Occupations: Singer, musician, artist
- Instruments: Singing, guitar, saung
- Years active: 1998–present
- Labels: Iron Cross Entertainment, LEGACY MUSIC NETWORK, and The Sun Music
- Member of: Iron Cross (band)

Y Wine (Burmese: ဝိုင်ဝိုင်း; pronounced [waɪɴ waɪɴ]) is a Burmese rock singer and the lead vocalist of the Myanmar rock band Iron Cross. Known for his role in popularizing rock music in Myanmar, Y Wine has been active in the music industry for over two decades. His work often combines traditional Burmese music with modern rock elements, creating a distinctive musical style.

== Early life and education ==
Y Wine was born and raised in Myitkyina, Myanmar. He attended Yadanabon University in Mandalay, majoring in English. During his university years, he developed an interest in music and former connections with other aspiring musicians, including Lay Phyu. These early interactions played a role in his decision to pursue a career in music.

== Music career ==
Y Wine began his career in 1998, as the lead vocalist of Burmese rock band Iron Cross, a band recognized for blending rock music with traditional Burmese influences. The group released several albums and gained popularity in the Myanmar music scene.

In addition to his work with Iron Cross, Y Wine pursued a solo career, releasing albums that feature a mix of rock ballads and upbeat tracks. His solo projects were released under local record labels such as Iron Cross Entertainment, The Legacy Music Network and The Sun Music.

== Discography ==
Y Wine has been part of both group and solo album projects. Releases include the following albums:

- Nay Sae Zin (1998) – Debut album with Iron Cross
- La Min Nat Pin Lae (2001) – Collaboration with Iron Cross
- Kyoe Mat Sung (2003) – Solo album
- A Chit Nyat (2004) – Solo album
- Ta Min Lae Pyan (2006) – Solo album
- Htar Wa Ra (2007) – Solo album
- Iron Cross 20th Anniversary (2009) – Commemorative group album.
- A Tone A Lae (2011) – Solo album
- Kha Yee Shay (2018) – Solo album, released alongside "Kyoe Mat Sung,"
