= Nwe Yin Win =

Nwe Yin Win နွဲ့ယဉ်ဝင်း
- Born: Joyce Win; 23 April 1945 (age 80); Sagaing, Burma
- Genres: Burmese pop
- Occupation: singer
- Years active: 1970s to present

Nwe Yin Win (Burmese: နွဲ့ယဉ်ဝင်း, pronounced [nwɛ̰ jɪ̀ɰ̃ wɪ́ɰ̃]; born Joyce Win on 23 April 1945) is a Burmese singer, considered one of the pioneers of modern Burmese pop music.

== Early life and education ==
Nwe Yin Win was born in Sagaing on 23 April 1945 to Min Swe (also known as Win Maung), of Bamar descent, and "Gertie Win" Tin Tin Hla, of Anglo-Burmese descent. She attended the English-speaking St. Francis Girls' School (today's Tamwe 4 High School) and St. Philomena's Convent High School (Sanchaung 2 High School). In 1967, she graduated from Rangoon University with a degree in English before getting a master's degree (MEd) in 1973 at the Rangoon Institute of Education. During her time in college, she began dabbling with a music career.

== Career ==
She was one of the most popular singers in Myanmar in the 1970s, known for her Burmese language covers of American country and pop songs. Before her career in entertainment, she was a university lecturer in English. She continues to make records, even dabbling into Burmese hip hop, and continues to perform in musical concerts.

== Album discography ==
Nwe Yin Win recorded many songs in the 1970s. The following is a partial list of her later releases.

=== Solo Albums ===
- Eskimo အက်စကီးမိုး (1979)
- A Chit So Tar အချစ်ဆိုတာ (1980)
- Shwe Pin Nar Tae Hnget War War ရွှေပင်နားတဲ့ငှက်ဝါဝါ (1981)
- A Chit Myo အချစ်မြို့ (1982)
- Shwe Tharahpu Tha Chin Myar ရွှေသရဖူသီချင်းများ (1982)
- Gypsy A Chit ဂျစ်ပစီအချစ် (1982)
- Nwe Yin Win Tha Chin Myar နွဲ့ယဉ်ဝင်းသီချင်းများ (1983)
- Min Thar မင်းသား (1984)
- Ar Kar Tha Sate Kuu အာကာသစိတ်ကူး (1985)
- An Ta Yel အန္တရာယ် (1993)
- More Than I Can Say (1995)
- Nwe Myo Sone Lin နွဲ့မျိုးစုံလင် (1996)
- Ma Nae Maung A Kaung Sone Tay Myar မနဲ့မောင် အကောင်းဆုံးတေးများ (1997)
- Shwe Pin Lae Nae A Kaung Sone Tay Myar ရွှေပင်လယ် နှင့် အကောင်းဆုံးတေးများ (2000)
- Hnit 40 Kha Yee... A Shi A Tine နှစ် ၄၀ ခရီး...အရှိအတိုင်း (2005)
- Thi Chin Ma Shi Yin A Chit Ma Shi... 45 Hnit Kha Yee သီချင်းမရှိရင်အချစ်မရှိ...၄၅ နှစ်ခရီး (2010)

=== With other artists ===
- Sat Su Ma (+ Kyi Swe) စပ်စုမ (+ ကြည်ဆွေ) (1979)
- Thaut Kyar Ma (+ Kyi Swe) သောကြာမ (+ ကြည်ဆွေ) (1980)
- Nay Yit Tot Chit Thel Lay Yaut Kyar Tway Ko Mone Lite Par (+ Cho Pyone) နေရစ်တော့ချစ်သဲလေး ယောက်ျားတွေကိုမုန်းလိုက်ပါ (+ ချိုပြုံး) (1979)
- Swan Taw Byo (+ Kyi Swe) ဆွမ်းတော်ဗျို့ (+ကြည်ဆွေ) (1980)
- Gyit Tu Ma Chit Chit Lu Mite ဂျစ်တူးမ ချစ်ချစ်လူမိုက် (+ နော်လီဇာ) (1980)
- Tha Pyay Thee Kauk (+ Su Myat Noe Oo) သပြေသီးကောက် (+ စုမြတ်နိုးဦး) (1998)
