= Kaiser (Burmese singer) =

Burmese singer-songwriter (1961–2026)

Kaiser ကိုင်ဇာ
- Born: 18 February 1961
- Origin: Yankin, Yangon, Burma
- Died: 22 August 2026 (aged 65) Yangon, Myanmar
- Genre: Burmese pop
- Occupation: Singer
- Instrument: Guitar
- Years active: 1978–2026

U Nyi Nyi Win (ညီညီဝင်း; 18 February 1961 – 22 August 2026), known professionally as Kaiser (Burmese: ကိုင်ဇာ, Burmese pronunciation: [kàiɰ̃zà]) or Kaizar, was a Burmese singer-songwriter who was most popular in the late 1970s and mid-1980s. An ethnic Rakhine, he was arguably the most successful male singer in Myanmar in the early 1980s. His rockabilly songs were popular across generations. He collaborated with leading songwriters of the day like Saw Bwe Mhu, Naing Myanmar, Soe Lwin Lwin, Maung Maung Zan, and Thukhamein Hlaing. His most successful songs were written by Naing Myanmar and Saw Bwe Mhu.

Kaiser was also a successful songwriter, who penned many commercially successful songs for top singers of the day, including May Sweet, and Maykhala, his wife in the mid-1980s. Most of his songs were of his own creation although he also sampled and covered Western rock-and-roll hits, most notably those by the Beatles. He called the Kissapanadi Hlaing Than album whose title track was about the Kaladan River in Rakhine State, his most satisfying track. Kaiser co-wrote the song with Maung Maung Zan, also an ethnic Rakhine.

Kaiser died in Yangon on the evening of 22 August 2026, at the age of 65.

== Discography ==
In a 2000 interview, he said he had released 20 albums and over 200 songs over his career.

=== Albums ===
- Akyeetan Ei Ahteekyan Ahtotpatti
- A Lwan
- A Nan Pan
- Ma No Ba Zay Ne Moe Ye
- Nauk Ta Khauk Lauk Taw Htat Pyaw Ba
- Thachin-Shin-Go Kyinna-Ba
- Kissapanadi Hlaing Than
- Tu-Hna-Ko Taingpyi (with May Sweet)
- Einmet Mya Go Tihtwinthu
- Chan Le Chan De Lwan Le Lwan De
- Myintmo Taung Tetthama
- Maung Dewutsaya
- Achit Hso Thi Mha
- Myanmar Pyi Go Lwan De
- Lwan Leippya Ye Ko-Paing Thanzin
- Naing Ngan Kyaw
- Gita Yazawin (1 & 2)
- Yazawin Twin Me Moe
- Kissapanadi Hlaing Than (Karaoke)
- Shwe Yadu A-Chit (Karaoke)
- Thachin-Shin-Ye Khayizin (Live Show 01)
- Maung Nge Phaw Go Lwan De Nya
- A-Lwan-Byay 2

=== Songs written for others ===
- Ma-No-Ba-Zay-Ne Moe Ye for May Sweet
- Ta-Chein-Don-Ga Tekkatho for Maykhala
