= Ah Nge =

Burmese rock singer

- Born: 28 December 1966 (age 59)
- Origin: Inle, Shan State, Burma
- Genres: Hard rock, heavy metal, soft rock
- Occupations: Singer, music producer
- Instrument: Guitar
- Years active: 1993–present
- Label: Iron Cross Entertainment
- Member of: Iron Cross

Ah Nge (Burmese: အငဲ, born 28 December 1966) is a Burmese rock singer. He is one of the lead vocalists of the popular rock band Iron Cross. Ah Nge rose to fame with his debut album Wint Nyin Myar Nae Ka Khon Chin.

== Biography ==
Ah Nge was born on 28 December 1966 in Inle, Shan State, Myanmar along with his elder brother Lay Phyu. He graduated from Mandalay University. Ah Nge married to Ma Thida, an assistant lecturer from Defence Services Technological Academy. They have two daughters. His eldest daughter, Lamin Kha, is also a singer.

On 21 June 2015, Ah Nge performed his solo show concert at the Myanmar Event Park (MEP), Myaynigone.

== Discography ==
=== Solo albums ===
- Wint Nyin Myar Nae Ka Khon Chin (1993)
- Sahara (1996)
- Sate Ywat Hlay
- Unplugged
- Tha Chin Myar Ye Dan Dar Ye (1999)
- Sa Hta Ma Arr Yone
- Khu Nwit Htway A Ka
- Zit Myit
- Koe

=== Collaborations ===
- 95 Myanmar Billboard Top Hits
- Chit Thu Tway Yae Tae Mhat Tan
- Doe Yet Chit Thu Myar Nayt
- IC UnpluggedIron Cross 20th Anniversary
- Iron Cross Acoustics
- LMN
- Ma De Hint Sone Hmat Myar
- Saunt Nay Tae Chit Thu Myar
- Saw Bwe Hmu A Mhat Ta Ya 2
- Tay Myone Nget Ye Hnit Nar Sel 2
- The Best Of Our Love
- We Love Sea Games
- Yar Su Thit
