= Chit San Maung =

Burmese musician, guitarist

Chit San Maung ချစ်စမ်းမောင်
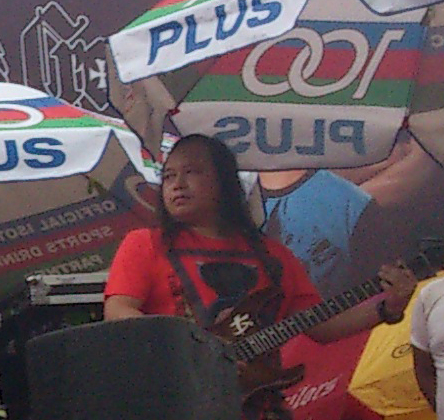

Background information
- Born: Nwe Khway, Hinthada Township
- Genres: Rock music
- Occupation: Musician
- Instrument: Lead guitar
- Years active: 1989-present
- Member of: Iron Cross

Chit San Maung (Burmese: ချစ်စမ်းမောင်) is a lead guitarist of the Burmese band Iron Cross. He also founded the PTL Recording Studio and worked as music producer and chief sound engineer. He released an album named Chauk Kyo Ka Wai (ခြောက်ကြိုးကဝေ), the first guitar solo album in Myanmar.

== Early life ==
Chit San Maung was born in Nwe Khway, Hinthada Township to parents Yu Si and his wife Aye Kyi.

== Personal life ==
Chit San Maung married to Naw Khin Khin Moe. They have a son named Saw Moeset Aung and two daughters named Khin Sandar Maung and Khin Cathrine Maung. His daughter Nge Ngal Lay is also a guitarist and singer.

== Discography ==
- Chauk Kyo Ka Wai (ခြောက်ကြိုးကဝေ)
